= The Bear season 4 =

The Bear
- Season 4
- Promotional poster
- Showrunners: Christopher Storer; Joanna Calo
- Starring: Jeremy Allen White; Ebon Moss-Bachrach; Ayo Edebiri; Lionel Boyce; Abby Elliott; Matty Matheson; Liza Colón-Zayas; Edwin Lee Gibson
- No. of episodes: 10

Release
- Original network: FX on Hulu
- Original release: June 25, 2025

Season chronology
- ← Previous; Season 3 Next → Season 5

The fourth season of the American comedy-drama television series The Bear premiered with all 10 episodes on June 25, 2025, on FX on Hulu. Christopher Storer and Joanna Calo returned as showrunners for the season. In March 2024, FX renewed The Bear for a fourth season, which began filming with the third season in February 2024, and was completed in early 2025.

Jeremy Allen White reprised his role as Carmy Berzatto, an award-winning chef who returns to his hometown of Chicago to manage the chaotic kitchen at his deceased brother's sandwich shop.

Ebon Moss-Bachrach, Ayo Edebiri, Lionel Boyce, Abby Elliott, Matty Matheson, Liza Colón-Zayas, and Edwin Lee Gibson also returned from the previous season as top-billed cast. Oliver Platt, Corey Hendrix, Jon Bernthal, Jamie Lee Curtis, Robert Townsend, Gillian Jacobs, Will Poulter, and Sarah Ramos reprised their recurring roles. Rob Reiner guest-starred as business consultant Albert Schnur in what would become his final television role.

The season premiered to positive reviews from critics, though reception was more muted than prior seasons. Edebiri and Boyce co-wrote a critically acclaimed episode centered around Sydney and performances by Edebiri, White, and Curtis again received positive attention. The season finale was a unique black-box-theater-style bottle episode featuring only four key members of main cast.

== Cast and characters ==
=== Main ===
- Jeremy Allen White as Carmen "Carmy" Berzatto
- Ebon Moss-Bachrach as Richard "Richie" Jerimovich
- Ayo Edebiri as Sydney "Syd" Adamu
- Lionel Boyce as Marcus Brooks
- Abby Elliott as Natalie "Sugar" Berzatto
- Matty Matheson as Neil Fak
- Liza Colón-Zayas as Tina Marrero
- Edwin Lee Gibson as Ebraheim

=== Recurring ===
- Jamie Lee Curtis as Donna Berzatto
- Molly Gordon as Claire Dunlap
- Gillian Jacobs as Tiffany "Tiff" Jerimovich
- Will Poulter as Luca
- Rob Reiner as Albert Schnur
- Corey Hendrix as Gary "Sweeps" Woods
- Oliver Platt as Jimmy "Cicero" Kalinowski
- Sarah Ramos as Jessica
- Andrew Lopez as Garrett
- Rene Gube as Rene
- Adam Shapiro as Adam Shapiro
- Ricky Staffieri as Theodore Fak
- Christopher Zucchero as Chi-Chi
- Paulie James as Chuckie
- Chris Witaske as Pete Katinsky
- Robert Townsend as Emmanuel Adamu
- Carmen Christopher as Chester

=== Guest ===
- Jon Bernthal as Michael Berzatto
- Brian Koppelman as Nicholas "The Computer" Marshall
- Mitra Jouhari as Kelly
- Alpana Singh as herself
- Gary Janetti as Mr. Clark
- Danielle Deadwyler as Chantel
- Arion King as T.J.
- Kate Berlant as Georgie
- David Zayas as David
- Josh Hartnett as Frank
- Brie Larson as Francie Fak
- John Mulaney as Stevie
- Sarah Paulson as Michelle Berzatto
- Bob Odenkirk as "Uncle" Lee Lane
- Annabelle Toomey as Eva Jerimovich

== Episodes ==
No. overall	No. in season	Title	Directed by	Written by	Original release date	Prod. code
29	1	"Groundhogs"	Christopher Storer	Christopher Storer	June 25, 2025	XCBV4001
A flashback depicts Carmy pitching the idea of opening a restaurant to Mikey, who is revealed to have come up with the name "the Bear". In the present, The Chicago Tribune's review of the Bear proves mixed, praising the food and the sandwich window, but criticizing the menu's inconsistency and restaurant's chaotic atmosphere. Cicero and Computer give the crew two months to turn the business around, otherwise they will be forced to shut down. Cicero places a clock in the kitchen counting down to this deadline by the hour. Carmy and Sydney focus on earning a Michelin star, committing to a more efficient and consistent operation. Richie hires Jess, Garrett, and Rene from Ever to aid in reforming the restaurant's practices.
30	2	"Soubise"	Christopher Storer and Duccio Fabbri	Catherine Schetina	June 25, 2025	XCBV4002
Weeks since Cicero's ultimatum, the Bear struggles with a shortage in ingredients due to budget cuts and the staff's dwindling motivation. Carmy and Sydney begin simplifying the components of the menu. Sydney reads an article about Shapiro's new restaurant. Tina urges Carmy to visit Natalie's newborn daughter Sophie, which he has continued putting off. Carmy calls Natalie to apologize; Natalie tells him it is okay if he is losing his passion for cooking.
31	3	"Scallop"	Christopher Storer	Rene Gube	June 25, 2025	XCBV4003
Sydney creates an updated, less costly version of the Bear's scallop dish, involving fewer ingredients; Carmy praises it and has it added to the menu that same day. Richie continues putting off the decision on whether to attend his ex-wife Tiff's wedding. Donna helps Cicero's efforts to sell his house. Ebraheim hires a business consultant named Albert Schnur to mentor him on how to expand the Beef window, which is currently the only part of the restaurant making profit. Marcus asks Carmy for more "firepower" with desserts. Richie arranges a surprise for a family dining at the restaurant for the first time with a snow-themed final course, delighting them. Carmy visits Claire at her home to apologize for his outburst in the refrigerator during the Bear's soft opening and opens up to her about his anxieties about their relationship. After leaving, Carmy calls Pete asking to update the terms of the restaurant's partnership agreement.
32	4	"Worms"	Janicza Bravo	Ayo Edebiri & Lionel Boyce	June 25, 2025	XCBV4004
Shapiro brings Sydney to visit his new restaurant under construction, promising her autonomy and an increased investment in the staff's learning. Sydney then visits her cousin Chantel to get her hair done. When Chantel leaves for errands, Sydney bonds with Chantel's 11-year-old daughter TJ, taking her shopping for groceries, cooking her a meal, and talking through her ongoing conflict with friends. Sydney uses the metaphor of sleepovers to discuss her indecision between staying at the Bear and moving to Shapiro's restaurant. Afterwards, Sydney calls Shapiro to discuss going over paperwork for their partnership.
33	5	"Replicants"	Christopher Storer	Karen Joseph Adcock	June 25, 2025	XCBV4005
Carmy attends an Al-Anon meeting and is moved by another member's vivid story of her brother's addiction. Sydney receives an updated partnership agreement from Carmy. Marcus sells his recently deceased mother's house with his roommate Chester's help. Carmy hires Luca as a stage to help Marcus. Tina talks to Carmy about his current struggle with reducing ingredients and advises him to slow down the pace of the menu. Carmy reveals to Sydney that he has decided on a set menu, admitting that his insistence on changing the menu every day was selfish and detrimental to the restaurant. Natalie brings baby Sophie to the restaurant. Sydney receives a call from the hospital saying her father has suffered a heart attack.
34	6	"Sophie"	Christopher Storer	Christopher Storer	June 25, 2025	XCBV4006
Sydney arrives at the hospital in a panic, but Claire tells her that her father is recovering. Sydney breaks down in tears over her guilt about making her father worry about her, but Claire comforts her, assuring her that it is a good thing to worry about loved ones. Richie opens up to Jess about his insecurities over co-parenting his daughter with Tiff's fiancé Frank, and his anxiety about attending her wedding. Albert suggests to Ebraheim that he turn the Beef window into a franchise. Neil angers Natalie when he says he invited his sister Francie – whom Natalie despises – to Tiff's wedding. Carmy, who is also hesitating going to Tiff's wedding out of fear of seeing Donna, agrees to go after talking to Natalie.
35	7	"Bears"	Christopher Storer	Joanna Calo	June 25, 2025	XCBV4007
The Berzattos arrive at Tiff's wedding, with Richie bringing Sydney along for emotional support. Carmy panics upon seeing Donna again and finds a moment to himself; he runs into Lee, who reveals to Carmy that he and Mikey became friends before the latter's death, and insists that Donna is working on improving herself. Sydney meets Donna and speaks positively about working with Carmy; Donna leaves the wedding soon after. Frank begs Richie's help in consoling his daughter Eva, who is hiding under a table to avoid performing a planned dance with Frank. Richie, Frank, and Claire get under the table to talk to her, and are gradually joined by most of the Berzattos as well as Tiff and the Faks; the group takes turns opening up about their fears. Claire and Carmy reconnect afterwards, while Natalie and Francie, revealed to be former best friends and who were once romantically involved, reconcile. Richie returns home alone but overjoyed.
36	8	"Green"	Christopher Storer	Joanna Calo & Christopher Storer	June 25, 2025	XCBV4008
Sydney calls Shapiro to decline his job offer; he reacts negatively, telling Sydney she is doing herself a disservice by staying at the Bear. Richie tells Jess about Mikey. Tina, who has been struggling to meet the goal of preparing pasta within three minutes, goes to Luca for help; he tells her to harness rather than fear the pressure she feels. Natalie and Computer go over the Bear's finances, which are still in jeopardy despite the cost cuts; Computer asks whether the restaurant is worth saving. Carmy reluctantly goes to Donna's to drop off their family photo album.
37	9	"Tonnato"	Christopher Storer	Joanna Calo & Christopher Storer	June 25, 2025	XCBV4009
Carmy drops the photo book off at Donna's, and spends time with her at her insistence. Donna tearfully apologizes for the way she treated her family, and tells Carmy she has been sober for nearly a year and wants to be a part of his life again. Carmy makes her the roast chicken he learned at the French Laundry. Ebraheim agrees to partner with Albert in franchising the Beef window. Albert meets Computer, who agrees that franchising is a good idea. Luca casually asks Tina to make a "test" version of the pasta dish, which she unwittingly completes in just under three minutes. After receiving a call from Food & Wine, Natalie announces that the magazine has named Marcus in their class of Best New Chefs. Pete calls Sydney to tell her that Carmy has written himself out of the updated partnership agreement, leaving the restaurant's ownership to her, Natalie, and Cicero.
38	10	"Goodbye"	Christopher Storer	Christopher Storer	June 25, 2025	XCBV4010
Sydney confronts Carmy over his decision to quit. Carmy insists he is making the best decision for the restaurant, arguing that he became a chef to avoid facing his familial trauma, and that Sydney is pursuing the field for the right reasons. He tells Sydney she is the reason the restaurant is surviving, and that he believes in her more than he believes in himself. Richie interrupts them; he is initially flippant about the news until Carmy reveals he came to Mikey's funeral, but could not bring himself to attend. The two have an honest and heartfelt conversation in front of Sydney, where they admit the resentments they held towards one another in the wake of Mikey's death. Carmy tells Richie that he is retiring in part to learn who he is outside of the kitchen. Sydney ultimately agrees to take over if Richie is also given a partnership stake, which he accepts. Natalie arrives and tearfully embraces Carmy upon learning the news while Cicero's clock eventually reaches zero.

== Production ==
=== Development ===
In March 2024, preceding the release of the third season, it was announced that FX had secretly renewed The Bear for a fourth season. The season was announced to be filming back-to-back with the third season.

=== Writing ===
Season 4 covers the in-universe time period from August to October 2023. The episodes "Green," "Tonnato," and "Goodbye" take place on the same day.

Cast members Ayo Edebiri and Lionel Boyce co-wrote an episode in the fourth season, their writing debuts on the series. Edebiri previously directed the third season's "Napkins".

=== Filming and cinematography ===
Parts of the fourth season were filmed with the third season, beginning in February 2024, with production set to restart in 2025. John Landgraf, chairman of FX Networks, commented about the filming after the 2024 Emmys, saying "We finished most of it. We haven't finished all of it, but we finished most of it, and it will be ready same time next year." Landgraf had stated that the combined filming schedule had resulted in around sixteen and a half episodes completed between the two seasons. Cinematographer Andrew Wehde stated in 2026, "We shot [season 3], and then we shot about six episodes of [season 4]," including the wedding in "Bears" and the finale "Goodbye." However, continued Wehde, "When we came back for [season 4], Chris and our editorial team had had an opportunity to cut things from four. And what we thought we shot, six or so episodes, turned out to be three or four. And then Chris rewrote with the team, more of a companion season to work with what we already kind of shot. And so it was a really interesting thing because in hindsight, you are somewhat stuck to a visual world that you started with."

Main star Jeremy Allen White stated in an interview with Esquire UK that filming was expected to take place in February or March 2025. Filming took place in Chicago, and wrapped in early 2025.

Wedhe told Another magazine that while the early visual influences on the series came from directors like Tony Scott, Michael Mann, Martin Scorsese, and Steven Soderbergh, by seasons 3 and 4 there was an increasing Chef's Table influence on the way they shot the show. He used the same Arri Alexa LF and Panavision H-series lenses that were used to shoot the first three seasons, but changed the lighting design to achieve a new look.

=== Costuming ===
Regarding the personal style of Sydney Adamu in season 4, according to costume designer Courtney Wheeler, "This season, we have a lot of Black American-based T-shirts. She's wearing a Negro league sweatshirt in one of the episodes...She's just someone who likes to collect, whether through her father or her mother, who passed away. I think clothes help ground her and convey her point of view."

=== Sound design ===
According to supervising sound editor Steve "Major" Giammaria, the sound of season 4 reflects that the Bear restaurant is on "an upward trajectory, [so] the sounds are less abrasive...it's more measured. There's like a metronome, a beat to the whole thing." He described the season as less aurally "vertical" and percussive than season 3, with more "horizontal sounds," like "simmering and bubbling and dishwashing."

=== Editing ===
Joanna Naugle told a film-editing podcast about her process on The Bear, "My favorite teacher at NYU was Sam Pollard, and he would always say, 'Everyone thinks continuity is the most important thing in editing. It's not. It's performance. You can get away with egregious continuity errors, if everyone's locked into the performance.' So that's definitely what I'm drawn to first and foremost. It's almost like fun as you're watching dailies to make a game of it and be like 'What's the difference between this take? What are the things I'm noticing?' If you're watching dailies they can all blur together but if you're like 'Oh, Ayo's lip quivered a little bit in this take, it really shows her vulnerability.' Or, 'Jeremy had such a funny little smirk at the end of this, that's really such a great button to the scene,' trying to look for those little moments, that's what I'll try to latch onto as I'm reviewing the footage. But also it's about finding that rhythm. Sometime the energy can be so different between takes that you're like, okay, if this is the one I want to go with, I have to use this as my skeleton and build on top of it."

=== Music ===
"Fast Slow Disco," a remix of a St. Vincent song, was used in the season 4 trailer. Britain's Far Out Magazine applauded the use of music in season 4, which "continued [The Bear's] great run of impeccable songs, but this time leaned in on itself to deliver the emotional punch, using recurring and revitalized songs to make its point...Love songs, all from the alternative space, litter the soundtrack: Cher, the Ramones, Elton John, and more." Time Out noted that the Ronettes had the most songs featured in season 4: "The group's vocal harmonies are sprinkled over three episodes, featuring their quintessential hits 'Baby, I Love You', '(The Best Part of) Breakin' Up' and 'Walking in the Rain'."

The producers were in less need of the show's composers, Johnny Iguana and Jeffrey Qaiyum, in season four, because their budget had increased. According to Iguana in June 2025, "If they want to have an English Beat song in one of their scenes now, they're just gonna purchase it and not ask us to make a replica. If you catch the last season and especially this coming season, there's very little original scoring. When you've got money to spend for a famous song, that's what you're gonna do."

== Release ==
The fourth season of The Bear premiered on June 25, 2025, on Hulu and Disney+.

== Reception ==
=== Critical response ===
On Rotten Tomatoes, 85% of 85 critics gave the fourth season a positive review. The website's critics consensus reads, "After simmering for too long, The Bear's fourth season finally turns the heat back up with a renewed sense of urgency, serving a rich meal despite tiresome wait times between courses." Metacritic assigned it a weighted average score of 72 out of 100 based on 40 reviews. It is the lowest-rated season of the series on either site.

Allison Herman of Variety called the season a "marked improvement" over the third, but added that "'better' isn't quite the same as 'enough to make the payoff worth the slog'." She praised the season's renewed focus on supporting characters neglected in the previous season, but wrote, "Season 4 can feel less like a cohesive statement in its own right than a sort of do-over, circling back to fill in gaps and pick up pieces that should've been addressed by now." Judy Berman of Time, meanwhile, found the season "just as inert" as the third, calling it "formless" and criticizing its emphasis on "quiet solo scenes" and "earnest two-handers" that feel "remarkably similar to one another". She lamented the series' overall shift from "humor and wonder and angst" to "relentless solemnity" in the third and fourth seasons. Commenting on the season finale, Berman called Ayo Edebiri's "understated performance" as Sydney "a highlight of The Bear's fourth season." Liam Matthews of TheWrap praised season 4's performances and named the fourth and seventh episodes as standouts, but similarly criticized the story as shapeless and lacking in payoff, writing, "its overemphasis on character and vibe at the expense of narrative momentum leaves it repetitive and flabby." Richard Lawson of Vanity Fair praised the season's few moments of "effective growth" but also criticized its repetitive storyline and lack of character development, adding that the show's "stillness"..."makes for fatally inert television". Angie Hahn of The Hollywood Reporter described the season as "muted" and felt the show "retreat[ing] into familiar territory", writing that the season "has the feel of a show burnt out from the effort of trying to outdo itself."

Ben Travers of IndieWire wrote, "season 4 is still pretty fun; an emotionally rich restaurant drama with great food, a few laughs, and lots of heart. Seen another way, though, and it's our second straight disappointment; a prolonged story propped up by its talented cast and dragged out for reasons that remain unclear." Jack Seale of The Guardian was more positive, writing that the show has "outgrown the 'Yes, chef!' rages and screaming matches in the pantry and morphed into something more tender, beautiful – and endlessly moving." Alan Sepinwall of Rolling Stone agreed, describing the season as "tense" and "heartwarmingly chaotic" and that it returns to "satisfying form". Sophie Gilbert of The Atlantic also positively reviewed the season, feeling it represented "progress, and forward momentum, and the impossible optimism of people changing for the better." She praised the season's emphasis on personal growth, writing, "after the slow-drip, languorous suffering of Season 3, it's thrilling to see the characters and the action move so purposefully and gratifyingly forward." Tara Bennett of IGN also described the season as a return to form, similarly praising its more "interior" stakes and intimate tone. She felt the season worked as a conclusion to the series, writing, "whether or not it's the series finale, it attains that special alchemy of satisfying closure while leaving plenty leftover for audiences to ponder about where these characters go next."

The Ringer columnist Ben Lindbergh wrote, "...with a mountain of emotional baggage unpacked, there's an opportunity to take a risk and redefine a series that's already made its mark on prestige TV. For worse or for better, The Bear has broken its pattern. 'Everything in life is just for a while,' Richie tells Sydney, quoting Philip K. Dick, as one does, in the midst of a pre-wedding panic attack. Life is too short not to say how you feel: The clock is counting down to the day when each of our parachutes fails. That goes for fictional characters, too, even if this series' clock just reset for a fifth season. At least the Berzattos and their associates have a chance to go out with drier eyes, fuller hearts, and deeper pockets. They used to yell loudly but suffer silently. They're learning to be loud in a more rewarding way."

The New Republic thought the season was self-conscious but a turn for the better, concluding, "this season recaptures something of what has been lost about this show. But The Bear doesn’t need to apologize, and, regardless, its apologies aren't enough. The Bear needs to move forward, to gut-renovate, to reimagine itself boldly yet again. The finale teases us with the possibility that it just might do that." David Bianculli of NPR's Fresh Air stated "Call The Bear a comedy if you must, but I won't. Watching this new season, I cried more times than I laughed. Yet however you characterize it, The Bear...is the best series on television."

At year's end, TheWrap named Ayo Edebiri's season four work one of the 10 best TV performances of 2025. The Bear appeared on multiple year-end "best of TV" lists. Shifter magazine named it their best TV show of 2025. RogerEbert.com's Clint Worthington wrote "Storer's open-heartedness and the weepy commitment of its cast make it incredible television, leveraging the goodwill they've spent seasons cultivating and stretching its cooking-as-catharsis mood to its limit...The food tastes good. I'll eat it." The Cleveland Plain-Dealer critic wrote that The Bear had "rebounded nicely after a self-indulgent third season." In March 2026, Glamour magazine recommended the first four seasons as "binge-worthy" and commented, "It's a strange thing that the only way to relieve the stress of the series is to keep watching it!"

=== Accolades ===
The fourth season received 8 nominations for the 78th Primetime Emmy Awards. Notable nominations included Outstanding Comedy Series, Ayo Edebiri for Outstanding Lead Actress in a Comedy Series, Christopher Storer for Outstanding Directing for a Comedy Series (for the episode "Bears"), and Jamie Lee Curtis for Outstanding Guest Actress in a Comedy Series. Rob Reiner won posthumously for Outstanding Guest Actor in a Comedy Series.
