= Scallop (The Bear) =

- The Bear episode
- Episode no.: Season 4 Episode 3
- Directed by: Christopher Storer
- Written by: Rene Gube
- Cinematography by: Andrew Wehde
- Editing by: Joanna Naugle
- Production code: XCBV4002
- Original air date: June 25, 2025
- Running time: 38 minutes

Guest appearances
- Oliver Platt as Jimmy Kalinowski; Jaime Lee Curtis as Donna Berzatto; Rob Reiner as Albert Schnur; Molly Gordon as Claire Dunlap; Gillian Jacobs as Tiffany Jerimovich; Robert Townsend as Emmanuel Adamu; Ricky Staffieri as Ted Fak; Corey Hendrix as Gary "Sweeps" Woods; Sarah Ramos as Chef Jess; Andrew Lopez as Garrett; Rene Gube as Rene; Mitra Jouhari as Kelly; Richard Esteras as Manny; José Cervantes as Angel; Gary Janetti as Mr. Clark; Christopher J. Zucchero as Chi-Chi; Paulie James as Chuckie

Episode chronology
← Previous "Soubise"	Next → "Worms"
- The Bear season 4

"Scallop" is the third episode of the fourth season of the American comedy-drama television series The Bear. It is the 31st overall episode of the series and was written by executive producer Rene Gube and directed by series creator Christopher Storer. It was released on Hulu on June 25, 2025, along with the rest of the season.

The series follows Carmy Berzatto (Jeremy Allen White), an award-winning New York City chef de cuisine, who returns to his hometown of Chicago to run his late brother Michael's failing Italian beef sandwich shop. With the financial backing of his uncle Jimmy (Oliver Platt) and help from his cousin Richie (Ebon Moss-Bachrach), sister Sugar (Abby Elliott), and chef Sydney (Ayo Edebiri), Carmy attempts to remodel the dingy Beef into a warm and hospitable fine-dining destination called the Bear.

"Scallop" is generally considered one of the high points of season four, a largely charming and warm installment in which changed behaviors and new outlooks begin to benefit the restaurant staff.

== Plot ==
Sydney creates an updated, less costly version of the Bear's scallop dish, involving fewer ingredients; Carmy praises it and has it added to the menu that same day. Richie continues putting off the decision on whether to attend his ex-wife Tiff's wedding. Donna helps Cicero's efforts to sell his house. Ebraheim hires a business consultant named Albert Schnur to mentor him on how to expand the Beef window, which is currently the only part of the restaurant making a profit. Marcus asks Carmy for more "firepower" with desserts. Richie arranges a surprise for a family dining at the restaurant for the first time with a snow-themed final course, delighting them, and impressing a nearby customer named Clark. (Note: Revealed in Season 5 Episode 8 to be a Michelin Inspector) Carmy says goodnight to Marcus, who is working late making éclairs, and then rather than get on his train home, Carmy runs to visit Claire at her home. He apologizes for his outburst in the refrigerator during the Bear's soft opening and opens up to her about his anxieties about their relationship. After leaving, Carmy calls Pete asking to update the terms of the restaurant's partnership agreement.

== Production ==
=== Writing ===
"Scallop" was written by Rene Gube.

=== Music ===
The soundtrack songs in this episode were "Slow Disco" by St. Vincent, "(The Best Part of) Breakin' Up" by the Ronettes, "Slim Slow Slider/I Start Breaking Down (Live)" by Van Morrison, "Only You Know" by Dion, "Haunted When the Minutes Drag" by Love and Rockets, and "Finest Worksong" by R.E.M.

== Reception ==
=== Critical reviews ===
The San Francisco Chronicle reviewer commended the episode's "extended, beautifully choreographed sequence" of Sydney cooking as a highlight of season four.

"Scallop" is the first of a run of more cathartic episodes after the emotional doldrums of season three. The Ringer reviewer argues this is because of Carmy's new willingness to relinquish control: "consciously or not, he opts to let his employees come into their own. And for once, the Bear operates...efficiently?" The A.V. Club reviewer commented "It's been hard, even punishing, to have watched The Bear fail for so long, so it's a true release to see the gang have a genuinely great night. There are finally more green Post-its on the order cards than red, Sweeps has found his stride as a somm, and Syd's scallop dish is a huge hit. Hell, Richie even trusts Carm to amp up the presentation on an Italian beef he's bringing to the VIP table."

Lady Geeks Media commended Edebiri's performance, writing about Sydney's reaction to Carmy's declaration that her scallop was "more than perfect": "This unprecedented declaration has a profound effect on Sydney, particularly in light of the past three seasons. In the span of 14 seconds, thanks to an acting masterclass by Ayo Edebiri, we see the weight of Carmy's words wash over her. The moment demonstrates how, even though she is far beyond relying on Carmy's approval, Sydney still very much respects his opinion."

Substream magazine's Murjani Rawls observed, "Carmy is becoming more of a point guard who's setting his teammates up for assists, rather than him going for 30 points a game." Meanwhile, as Syd and Marcus manage their relationships with their dads, and Carmy reflects briefly on his absentee father, the restaurant staff "is a big, dysfunctional, and emotional family where people can retreat from the craziness of regular life into the unpredictability of the kitchen. The real question is, can you have a foot in both worlds?"

Rolling Stone Philippines declared Carmy's apology one of the top six freakouts in the freakout-rich history of the show: "What starts as a tense but calm confrontation turns into a loud, angry fight, with both parties venting out their months-long frustrations at each other. Claire is quick to point out how hurt she felt when Carmy put his walls up against her when they were dating, and Carmy in turn can't quite figure out how to properly tell her he loves her without sounding like an asshole. The night ends with Claire in tears and closing the door on Carmy, who is left standing alone on the sidewalk. Did we hope that Carmy wouldn't mess up his big apology? Yes. Unfortunately, him fumbling the bag with Claire is very on brand for him, and their sidewalk fight provides a sad, but realistic, second act to their last heated argument."

=== Accolades ===
Award	Category	Nominee(s)	Result	Ref.
Primetime Creative Arts Emmy Awards	Outstanding Cinematography for a Series (Half-Hour)	Andrew Wehde	Nominated	
Primetime Creative Arts Emmy Awards	Outstanding Sound Mixing for a Comedy or Drama Series (Half-Hour) and Animation	Steve "Major" Giammaria, Scott D. Smith, Patrick Christensen, Ryan Collison, and Connor Nagy	Nominated	
