= Violet (The Bear) =

- The Bear episode
- Episode no.: Season 3 Episode 4
- Directed by: Christopher Storer
- Written by: Christopher Storer
- Cinematography by: Andrew Wehde
- Editing by: Adam Epstein; Joanna Naugle
- Production code: XCBV3004
- Original release date: June 26, 2024
- Running time: 33 minutes

Guest appearances
- Josh Hartnett as Frank; Molly Gordon as Claire; Robert Townsend as Emmanuel Adamu; Chris Witaske as Pete; Edwin Lee Gibson as Ebraheim; Ricky Staffieri as Theodore Fak; Adam Shapiro as Chef Adam Shapiro; Annabelle Toomey as Eva Jerimovich; Christopher Zucchero as Chi-Chi; Jerry Boone as himself

Episode chronology
| ← Previous "Doors" | Next → "Children" |
- The Bear season 3

"Violet" is the fourth episode of the third season of the American television comedy-drama The Bear. It is the 22nd overall episode of the series and was written and directed by series creator Christopher Storer. It was released on Hulu on June 26, 2024, along with the rest of the season.

The series follows Carmen "Carmy" Berzatto, an award-winning New York City chef de cuisine, who returns to his hometown of Chicago to run his late brother Michael's failing Italian beef sandwich shop. In the episode, Sydney chooses to move out for a new apartment, while also discovering about an important visit to the restaurant. Meanwhile, Richie questions his role in his daughter's life.

== Plot ==
Carmy (Jeremy Allen White) reminisces over a conversation he had with Claire (Molly Gordon), where he relates how he got the mark on his hand from a hot pot. Sydney (Ayo Edebiri) meets with her father, Emmanuel (Robert Townsend), as she leases a new apartment. Emmanuel is worried over Sydney's decision, as he believes the apartment is too small and expensive.

As Sydney walks on the streets, she runs into Adam Shapiro (Adam Shapiro), the Ever CDC. He reveals he recently visited The Bear and despite witnessing the chaos, loved the food and compliments Sydney. Fak (Matty Matheson) and Theodore (Ricky Staffieri) decide to mount portraits of multiple important critics for the staff to memorize. When they show it to Carmy (Jeremy Allen White), he is taken aback, but likes the idea. Richie (Ebon Moss-Bachrach) takes Eva (Annabelle Toomey) with Tiffany and her fiancée, Frank (Josh Hartnett). Frank confides in Richie that he feels worried that he did not consult with Richie over his marriage proposal, but Richie states he does not mind it.

Richie shares the dilemma over his presence in his daughter's life to Sugar (Abby Elliott), but she tells him to be there for her. The conversation is interrupted when they receive a call from the Chicago Tribune informing them a photographer is coming to take pictures of the restaurant. When they question Carmy and Sydney, Sydney realizes that this means a Tribune food critic has already visited the restaurant and will publish a review soon, alarming the rest of the staff.

== Production ==
=== Development ===
In May 2024, Hulu confirmed that the fourth episode of the season would be titled "Violet", and was to be written and directed by series creator Christopher Storer. It was Storer's 11th writing credit and 15th directing credit.

=== Casting ===
The episode features the first guest appearance by Josh Hartnett, who portrays Tiffany's fiancé. Hartnett previously met with Storer years prior when they discussed a possible role for a film. Later, Storer offered the role to Hartnett and he accepted it without even reading the script. Hartnett was fascinated by the experience, saying that it was "refreshing" to see how quickly they could film the scenes. Gillian Jacobs told The Hollywood Reporter in 2024, "I could watch the scene with Josh and Ebon on loop: Ebon trying to disappear into the wall and Josh cornering him with niceness and care and concern and saying all the right things. It informs so much."

=== Filming ===
The farmer's market where Tina shopped was set up outside a restaurant called Longman & Eagle near Logan Square. For Tina's produce-buying scene, set decorator Eric Frankel organized a "real" farmer's market with about 14 or 15 vendors who sell at actual markets in the Chicago area. Frankel told a set-decorating podcast interviewer, "All the crew went home with vegetables and bread and fruit, honey." The vendor who tells Tina "what grows together, goes together" is Jerry Boone of Froggy Meadow Farm.

=== Film editing and sound design ===
The film editors Joanna Naugle and Adam Epstein described the collaboration with The Bear's sound mixers, led by Steve "Major" Giammaria, in creating the audiovisual experience Carmy's panicked reaction to the wall of critics, as an example of a particularly dynamic and successful interaction between the two departments.

=== Music ===
Songs featured on the soundtrack of the episode include "Pearly-Dewdrops' Drops" by Cocteau Twins, "Spinning Away" by Brian Eno and John Cale, "Una furtiva lagrima" (a tenor aria from act II of Gaetano Donizetti's 1832 opera L'elisir d'amore), "Long Live (Taylor's Version)" by Taylor Swift, and "Getchoo" by Weezer.

== Reception ==
=== Critical reviews ===
Jenna Scherer of The A.V. Club gave the episode an "A–" grade and wrote, "We're used to The Bear showing us how intense and devastating the restaurant business can be. But when Claire tells Carm the story of a particularly awful case at the hospital, the show reminds us that it's nothing compared to being a friggin' ER doctor."

Marah Eakin of Vulture gave the episode a 3 star out of 5 rating and wrote, "Not every episode of The Bear can be packed with consequence. Some just have to move the story along. That's the case with "Violet," which follows Syd, Carmy, Richie, Nat, and the Faks as they move through their restaurant-adjacent lives." Nicole Gallucci of Decider complimented Richie's scenes with Frank, "Congrats to Ebon Moss-Bachrach for bringing warmth and depth to another Richie Swift scene. And congrats to Josh Hartnett for manifesting his dream role on The Bear just like Travis Kelce manifested his dream girlfriend."

Josh Rosenberg of Esquire wrote, "Right now Carmy is alone. In fact, it seems as if everyone's alone in their own way. Marcus lost his mother, Sydney is setting out on her own, and Richie's young daughter can tell he's lonely. The only way through is together."
