= Soubise (The Bear) =

- The Bear episode
- Episode no.: Season 4 Episode 2
- Directed by: Christopher Storer & Duccio Fabbri
- Written by: Catherine Schetina
- Cinematography by: Andrew Wehde
- Editing by: Joanna Naugle
- Production code: XCBV4002
- Original air date: June 25, 2025
- Running time: 32 minutes

Guest appearances
- Oliver Platt as Jimmy Kalinowski; Chris Witaske as Pete; Robert Townsend as Emmanuel Adamu; Ricky Staffieri as Ted Fak; Corey Hendrix as Gary "Sweeps" Woods; Sarah Ramos as Chef Jess; Andrew Lopez as Garrett; Rene Gube as Rene; Brian Koppelman as the Computer; Alpana Singh as herself; Christopher J. Zucchero as Chi-Chi; Paulie James as Chuckie; Donnie Madia as himself

Episode chronology
← Previous "Groundhogs"	Next → "Scallop"
- The Bear season 4

"Soubise" is the second episode of the fourth season of the American comedy-drama television series The Bear. It is the 30th overall episode of the series and was written by Catherine Schetina and directed by series creator Christopher Storer and Duccio Fabbri. It was released on Hulu on June 25, 2025, along with the rest of the season.

The series follows Carmy Berzatto (Jeremy Allen White), an award-winning New York City chef de cuisine, who returns to his hometown of Chicago to run his late brother Michael's failing Italian beef sandwich shop. With the financial backing of his uncle Jimmy (Oliver Platt) and help from his cousin Richie (Ebon Moss-Bachrach), sister Sugar (Abby Elliott), and chef Sydney (Ayo Edebiri), Carmy attempts to remodel the dingy Beef into a warm and hospitable fine-dining destination called the Bear.

"Soubise" is considered an emotional low-point episode, as Carmy and Richie grapple, separately, with the consequences of their choices.

== Plot ==
Weeks since Cicero's ultimatum, the Bear struggles with a shortage in ingredients due to budget cuts and the staff's dwindling motivation. Carmy and Sydney begin simplifying the components of the menu. Sydney reads an article about Shapiro's (Adam Shapiro) new restaurant. Tina (Liza Colón-Zayas) urges Carmy to visit Natalie's newborn daughter Sophie, which he has continued putting off. Carmy calls Natalie to apologize; Natalie tells him it is okay if he is losing his passion for cooking.

== Production ==
The episode was written by Catherine Schetina. The scene at Alpana was filmed on location at the restaurant over the course of one day in February 2025. The Bear crew filmed an hour of Alpana Singh and Corey Hendrix (in character) talking about wine and the inner world of sommeliers. Singh had previously participated in a Chicago culinary conference hosted by The Bear creator Christopher Storer.

== Reception ==
The A.V. Club gave "Soubise" a B+, commending the comedy in the episode (Tina versus Carmy, Carmy versus math), and the character growth, as "Carmy is finally emerging from a season-long fugue state. For the first time in a long time, he has escaped the prison of his own brain and noticed the hard work of the people around him, who have grown and evolved while he was stuck in a holding pattern." Vulture rated "Soubise" three out of five stars, commenting "Over the course of four seasons, we've seen some really terrible stuff happen at the Bear...But nothing has seemed quite as sad as what's happening in the second episode of this season, because what's happening is absolute resignation," highlighting Richie's despondency as particularly painful: "...and as he falls asleep, in a stammering prayer, he asks God to please help him out with the Bear, because 'if it's fucked, then I'm fucked, and it's the last thing that's keeping me attached to anything.' Talk about awful."

Decider called it a "total dud," questioned the wisdom of face-acting-only, virtually dialogue-free interactions between main characters, and criticized the Sweeps somm-training about parings with "boredom, death, and other culinary options offered at The Bear" as playing out like sponsored content "running on a loop at a Hyatt Regency when you skim through the TV's main homepage menu."

Substream magazine also noted the episode's "low point" tone, "The vibes are...terrible, and the building has been stripped of any excitability whatsoever. There are no fights, no calling out plates, no extreme amount of orders coming through—it's just...melancholy."

=== Accolades ===
Jeff Lingle and Jason Lingle were nominated for a 2026 Motion Picture Sound Editors Golden Reel Award for Outstanding Achievement in Music Editing – Short Form for "Soubise."
