= Hands (The Bear) =

- The Bear episode
- Episode no.: Season 1 Episode 2
- Directed by: Christopher Storer
- Written by: Christopher Storer
- Cinematography by: Andrew Wehde
- Editing by: Joanna Naugle
- Original release date: June 23, 2022
- Running time: 32 minutes

Guest appearances
- Matty Matheson as Neil Fak; Edwin Lee Gibson as Ebraheim; Oliver Platt as Jimmy "Cicero" Kalinowski; Chris Witaske as Pete; Amy Morton as Nancy Chore; Joel McHale as Chef David Fields; Corey Hendrix as Gary "Sweeps" Woods

Episode chronology
← Previous "System"	Next → "Brigade"
- The Bear season 1

"Hands" is the second episode of the first season of the American television comedy-drama The Bear. The episode was written by series creator Christopher Storer. It was released on Hulu on June 23, 2022, along with the rest of the season.

The series follows Carmen "Carmy" Berzatto, an award-winning New York City chef de cuisine, who returns to his hometown of Chicago to run his late brother Michael's failing Italian beef sandwich shop. In the episode, Carmy discovers that Michael owed money to a family friend, while the shop faces problems with a health inspector.

The episode received mostly positive reviews from critics, who praised the performances, tone and character development.

== Plot ==
One year prior, Carmy works at a fine dining restaurant in New York City. While he tries to maintain control in the kitchen, the staff is led by an abusive boss (Joel McHale), who uses every opportunity to insult Carmy and the rest of the staff. One of these includes questioning Carmy's role in the kitchen, claiming he does not belong there.

In present day, Carmy begins to notice the dirty environment of the kitchen and tries to get the staff to clean their areas. That night, Carmy finds that he has been cooking while sleepwalking, causing a small fire in his apartment. The following day, the staff is surprised to meet Nancy, a health inspector who arrives to check the shop. Her brother Ron was the previous health inspector assigned to the shop and he made sure to give them a passing grade, but has since passed away. She quickly finds a lot of safety and sanitation issues, particularly for a pack of cigarettes left in the stove, which Carmy quickly blames Richie. She gives the shop a "C" grade, re-affirming that they cannot get another reevaluation until 30 days later. He gets the staff to fix their problems, including sending Richie to a hardware store to fix a hole in the kitchen.

Family friend Jimmy, referred as "Uncle Cicero", stops by the shop to talk to Carmy. He reveals that Michael asked Cicero for $300,000 that he never paid back, criticizing his brother's actions in giving him the shop. Cicero offers to buy the restaurant back to settle the debt, but Carmy declines, stating that he will pay back the loan. While talking to Sugar on the phone, she suggests attending Al-Anon meetings to help himself. Richie and Sydney get into fights while buying store to fix the hole, but they bond after Richie makes a phone call to console his daughter. Richie reveals to Sydney that Michael wouldn't allow Carmy to work in the restaurant when he was younger and that he shot himself in the head four months earlier. By the end of the night, Carmy decides to hire Sydney as a proper chef, ending her intern position. While taking a break for a cigarette, Carmy realizes that he was responsible for leaving the pack of cigarettes in the stove.

== Production ==
=== Development ===
In May 2022, Hulu confirmed that the second episode of the season would be titled "Hands", and was to be written by series creator Christopher Storer. This marked Storer's second writing and directing credit.

=== Filming ===
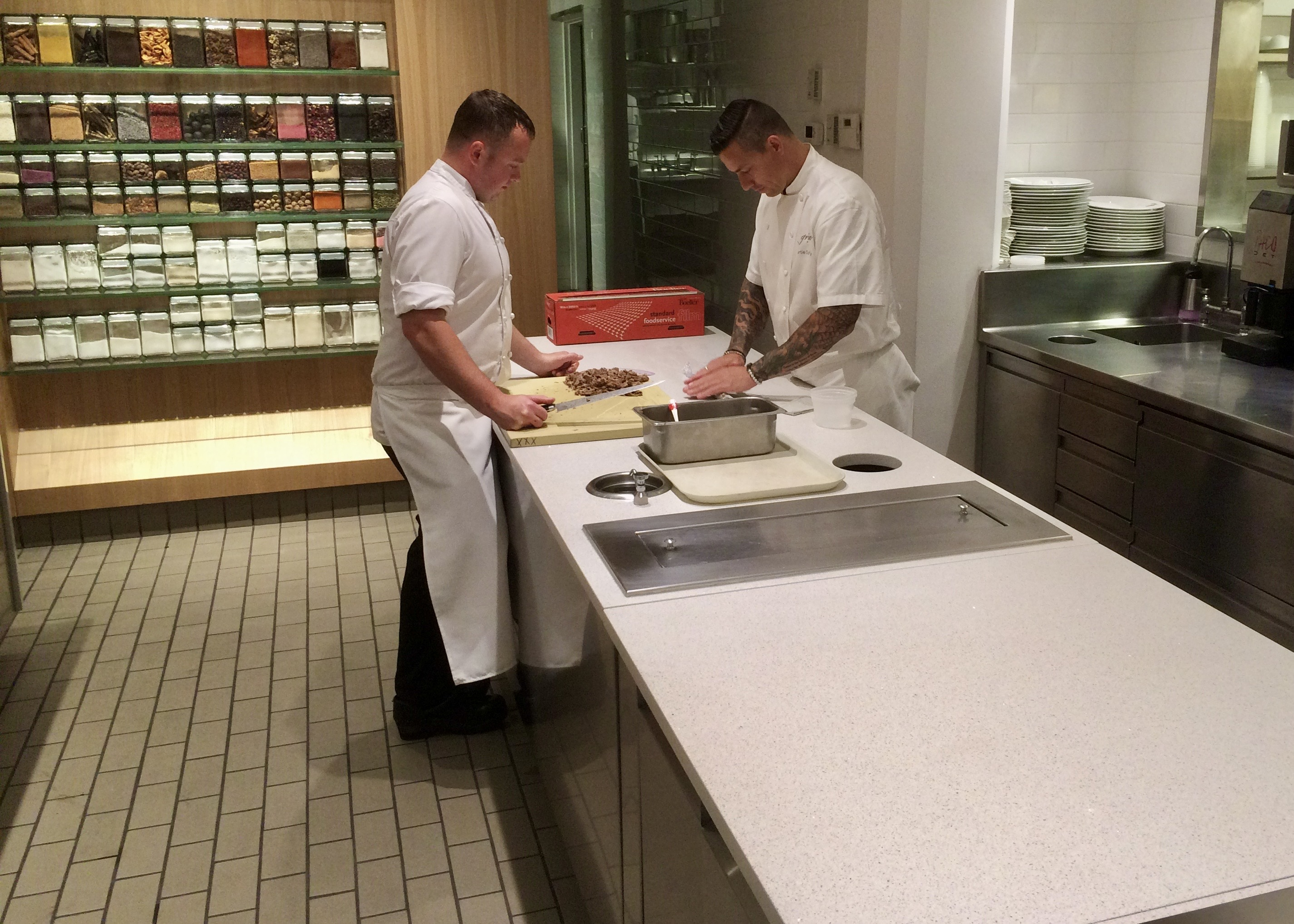
The New York flashback scenes were filmed at Grace restaurant in Chicago (2016)

The scenes with White's Carmy and McHale's Fields were shot over "a single morning." Chicago's three-Michelin-star Grace restaurant played the role of Fields' restaurant in New York.

=== Editing ===
Film editor Joanna Naugle told Gold Derby that the producers made a particular effort to endow Carmy's New York workplace with a stilted, defensive energy: "We had to set up a completely different atmosphere. We had to make it really quiet with a lot of digital motion to make it feel seamless." Editor Adam Epstein commented, "That transition out to the call 'Hands! Hands! Hands!' is one of my favorite turns in the whole series. From the gleaming white to this, the scuzzy kind of green, yellow."

=== Music ===
The episode included songs, such as "Have You Seen Me Lately?" by Counting Crows, and "Saint Dominic's Preview" by Van Morrison. Executive producer Josh Senior said that this was to show Richie and Carmy's contrasting personalities, "It felt like an opportunity to show Richie being vulnerable, and at the same time have the same song mean something totally different for Carmy."

== Critical reviews ==
"Hands" received mostly positive reviews from critics. Marah Eakin of Vulture gave the episode a 4 star out of 5 rating and wrote, "“Hands” isn't as frenetic and electric as the show's pilot, but in a way that's good. It would be hard to keep up that energy for the whole series, especially as the restaurant does seem to at least be on some long and winding path toward maybe, maybe, maybe getting its shit back together."

Mia Sidoti of MovieWeb named the episode as the seventh best of the season, writing ""Hands", episode two, gives us a much-needed backstory for Carmy when he was in New York City as a fine dining chef and saw how his relationship was with the head chef at the restaurant. He was verbally abused and treated terribly, so the contrast to the way he treats his crew with respect and appreciation is stunning and makes you feel for Carmy even more. We also learn that he sleepwalks and cooks things in his sleep, leading him to almost burn down his apartment, which is shocking and stressful for the audience." In 2024, Josh Wigler of The Hollywood Reporter named the episode as the 23rd best of the series, writing "Joel McHale debuts as an at-the-time unnamed fine-dining chef who serves as Carmy's boogeyman. While it takes almost two full seasons for the character to return, McHale's performance is haunting enough that when he does return in the future, the significance of his presence is immediately felt."
