= Soubise =

Soubise can refer to:

- Soubise, a salpicon of cooked and pureed rice and onions; used primarily "au gratin". (steaks, tournedos)
- Soubise sauce, based on Béchamel sauce, with the addition of a soubise of onion and rice purée
- Soubise, Charente-Maritime, a commune of the Charente-Maritime département, in France
- Benjamin, Duke of Soubise (? 1580-1642), Huguenot leader
- Charles, Prince of Soubise (1715–1787), peer and Marshal of France
- Julius Soubise (1754–1798), freed Afro-Caribbean slave and British fop
- Prince of Soubise
- Princess of Soubise
- Hôtel de Soubise, a Parisian mansion that hosts the Museum of French History and a part of the French National Archives
- "Soubise," a 2025 episode of The Bear TV series
