= Groundhogs (The Bear) =

- The Bear episode
- Chicago Tribune review
- Episode no.: Season 4 Episode 1
- Directed by: Christopher Storer
- Written by: Christopher Storer
- Cinematography by: Andrew Wehde
- Editing by: Joanna Naugle
- Production code: XCBV4001
- Original air date: June 25, 2025
- Running time: 32 minutes

Guest appearances
- Oliver Platt as Jimmy "Cicero" Kalinowski; Chris Witaske as Pete; Gillian Jacobs as Tiffany "Tiff" Jerimovich; Adam Shapiro as Chef Adam Shapiro; Corey Hendrix as Gary "Sweeps" Woods; Sarah Ramos as Jessica; Andrew Lopez as Garrett; Rene Gube as Rene; Brian Koppelman as Nicholas "The Computer" Marshall; Richard Esteras as Manny; José Cervantes as Angel; Jon Bernthal as Michael Berzatto

Episode chronology
← Previous "Forever"	Next → "Soubise"
- The Bear season 4

"Groundhogs" is the first episode of the fourth season of the American comedy-drama television series The Bear. It is the 29th overall episode of the series and was written and directed by series creator Christopher Storer. It was released on Hulu on June 25, 2025, along with the rest of the season.

The series follows Carmy Berzatto (Jeremy Allen White), an award-winning New York City chef de cuisine, who returns to his hometown of Chicago to run his late brother Michael's failing Italian beef sandwich shop. With the financial backing of his uncle Jimmy (Oliver Platt) and help from his cousin Richie (Ebon Moss-Bachrach), sister Sugar (Abby Elliott), and chef Sydney (Ayo Edebiri), Carmy attempts to remodel the dingy Beef into a warm and hospitable fine-dining destination called the Bear.

In this episode, the staff returns to work after the Chicago Tribune posts its review, dealing with the aftermath and how to proceed with the restaurant. The episode received mostly positive reviews from critics, who praised its tone, focused storylines, and performances.

== Plot ==
In a flashback, Mikey helps Carmy with a meal in the kitchen. As Mikey mentions problems with his rental car business, Carmy suggests the idea of opening a restaurant. Despite some of Mikey's skepticism, Carmy claims that restaurants always bring good memories to everyone and they can make people happier. When Mikey asks what should it be called, Carmy suggests "Mikey's". Mikey says he has a better name.

In present day, Carmy leaves for work. The Chicago Tribune review is seen on a newspaper with the headline: "BEAR Necessities Missing: The BEAR stumbles with culinary dissonance". At The Bear, he talks with Sydney over the review; the critic praised the food and the sandwich window, but criticized the menu's inconsistency and restaurant's chaotic atmosphere. While Carmy and Sydney try to move past it, both Richie and Tina aim to improve their skills after reading the review. Cicero visits the restaurant, and informs the staff that they will have two months to finally start turning a profit, as The Computer has concluded that payments and attendance could point to a dead business. If they fail to achieve it, the restaurant will be forced to close.

As Richie begins to apologize for failing in identifying the critic, he gets into another argument with Carmy over taking the blame. Cicero and Computer agree that getting one Michelin star could save the business, but they also warn them to stop hiring people and wasting money. Richie then reveals that he actually already hired "non-negotiables": Jess, Garrett, and Rene from Ever. They help introduce a new system of communication with the staff, which will help them lose less time at work. During their first night together as a staff, they manage to work together while avoiding problems. The episode ends with a montage of timers and clocks, and Carmy looking at the countdown timer, anxious, or perhaps in anticipation.

== Reception ==
"Groundhogs" received mostly positive reviews from critics. Jenna Scherer of The A.V. Club gave the episode a "B" grade and wrote, "After last year's strangely listless 10-episode run, the season four premiere is a welcome return to form for a series that built its reputation on rapid-fire dialogue, big feelings, and harried chefs sweating into their béchamel."

Marah Eakin of Vulture gave the episode a 4 star out of 5 rating and wrote, "I have a hard time believing that The Bear would ever really fuck over our onscreen pals given that their scrappy perseverance is the whole heart of the show, but the stakes this season are pretty evident in that big clock. The season is just getting started, but it looks like the end may already be in sight." Eakin would rank the episode as the 15th best episode of the first four seasons. A.J. Daulerio of Decider wrote, "This sort of meta 'screw all the haters' way of saying 'sorry, not sorry' reminds me of how Lena Dunham used to make it known that she read all the reviews about Girls by writing storylines that would often be direct responses to the show's critics."

Bryce Olin of Show Snob wrote, "Overall, I don't know how much I loved the season 4 premiere. It was a solid episode. There were a lot of things that needed to happen to shift this story and move Carmen's quest to be great back in the right direction after the major steps back in season 3. There's still a lot of drama to be had, though."

Substream magazine argued, "Christopher Storer creates an easy re-entry point with 'Groundhogs', in which he still places Carmy as the centerpiece. He has to adjust—whether he chooses to do it or others do it for him. This time, it may be a hair too late for Carmy to do so."
