= Dogs (The Bear) =

- The Bear episode
- Episode no.: Season 1 Episode 4
- Directed by: Christopher Storer
- Written by: Sonya Levitsky-Weitz
- Cinematography by: Andrew Wehde
- Editing by: Joanna Naugle
- Production code: XCBV1004
- Original air date: June 23, 2022
- Running time: 31 minutes

Guest appearances
- Matty Matheson as Fak; Edwin Lee Gibson as Ebra; Oliver Platt as Jimmy "Cicero" Kalinowski; Chris Witaske as Pete; Corey Hendrix as Gary "Sweeps" Woods; Carmen Christopher as Chester; Jack Callahan as very old man; Mick Napier as Cousin Frank; Jennifer Folsom as Debbie; Sebastian Merlo as Nicky; David Folsom as Phil

Episode chronology
| ← Previous "Brigade" | Next → "Sheridan" |
- The Bear season 1

"Dogs" is the fourth episode of the first season of the American comedy-drama television series The Bear. It is the fourth overall episode of the series and was written by Sonya Levitsky-Weitz and directed by Christopher Storer. It was released on Hulu on June 23, 2022, along with the rest of the season.

The episode received positive reviews, with several reviewers praising the episode's humour.

== Plot ==
Carmy and Richie cater a children's birthday party for Cicero. Carmy creates homemade Ecto-Cooler, which is accidentally spiked with Richie's Xanax, causing the children to fall asleep in the yard. When Carmy tells Cicero about the Xanax, Cicero responds that he actually doesn't mind the quiet. Meanwhile, Sydney butts heads but eventually bonds with the restaurant staff and begins to earn their respect. Marcus becomes passionate about his new chocolate cake program.

== Production ==
=== Writing ===
"Dogs" was written by Sofya Levitsky-Weitz.

=== Casting ===
Mick Napier, Sue Salvi, and Paul Grondy are actors from the Chicago improv scene who appear in the episode.

=== Music ===
The songs featured in the episode are "One Fine Day" from the 2008 Everything That Happens Will Happen Today album by David Byrne and Brian Eno during the donut montage, the Today! version of "Help Me, Rhonda" by the Beach Boys, the 2016 "Loved by You" single by Kirby Lauryen, and "Check It Out" by John Mellencamp.

Regarding the use of Mellencamp, Chris Storer told Steven Hyden of Uproxx in 2022, "This is hyper-specific, but growing up in Chicago in the mornings before school, I remember you would hear the local Fox station with the traffic report, and for whatever reason the bridge of 'Check It Out' was always played over the traffic report. And I was like, 'Why is this John Cougar Mellencamp song on this?' There was really something about this team coming together as a family for the first time, and all feeling exhausted for different reasons, but also feeling like they got to know each other a little bit better in this very strange turn of events. And something about it just felt right when we put it on—they're eating ice cream and cake and listening to John Mellencamp."

== Reception ==
=== Critical reviews ===
The Vulture critic appreciated this lighter episode full of "heart and grit," but thought it went heavy on the "Chicago" references, for instance pushing the regionalism excessively with a cloying reference to the death of Chicago native actor-director Harold Ramis. The New York Times, on the other hand, thought the Ramis nod was a nice "deep cut" nod to the city's vibe. Collider described "Dogs" as a "comedic break" based on a fish out of water premise as Carmy and Richie do a catering job serving juvenile customers in a suburban milieu. Screen Rant deemed it "one of the show's funniest episodes" and "one of the funniest episodes of any show ever made."

=== Accolades ===
| Award | Category | Nominee(s) | Result | Ref. |
|---|---|---|---|---|
| Primetime Creative Arts Emmy Awards | Outstanding Guest Actor in a Comedy Series | Oliver Platt | Nominated | |
