= The Bear (TV series) =

American television series

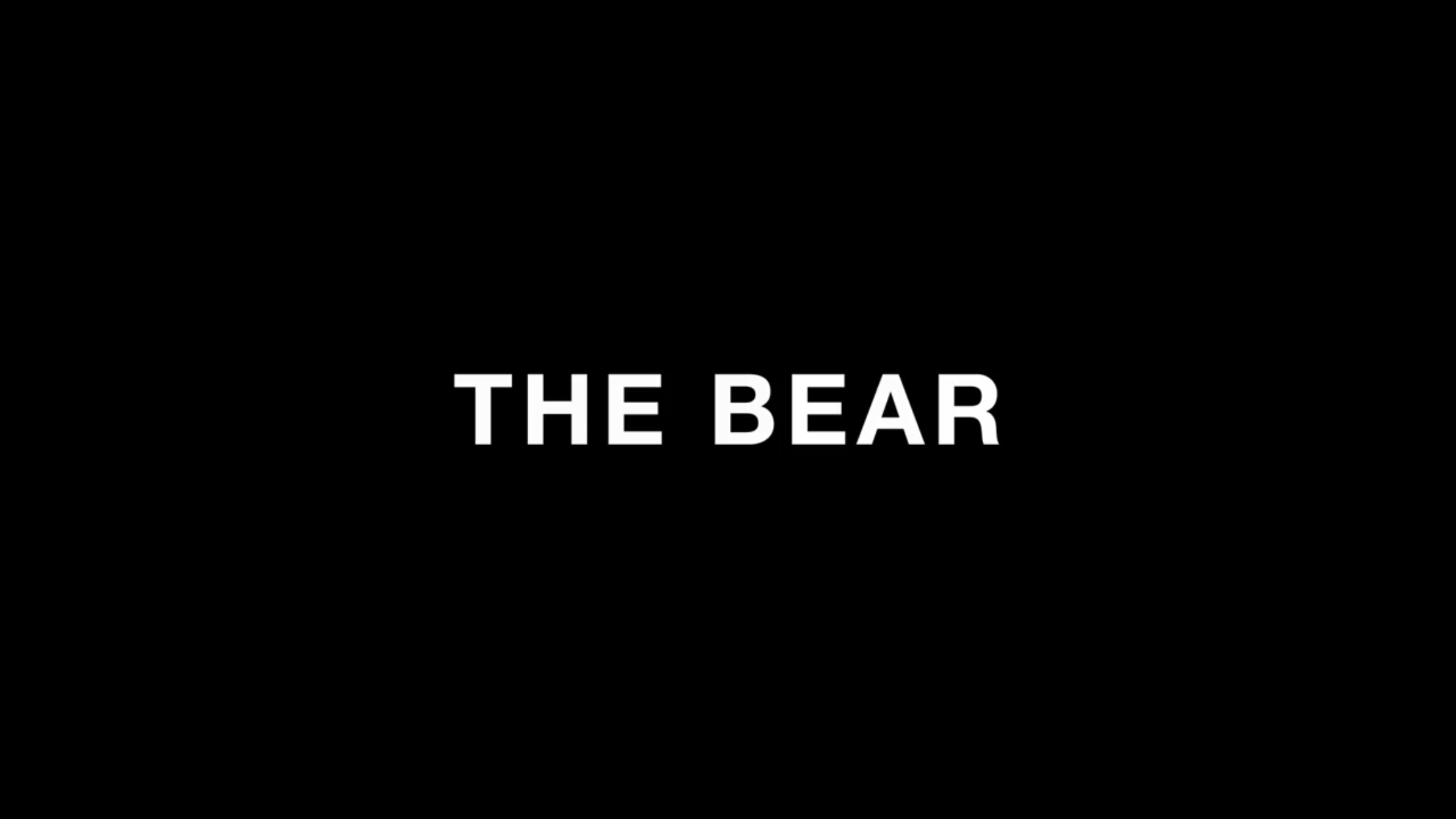
- Genre: Comedy-drama; Psychological drama
- Created by: Christopher Storer
- Showrunners: Christopher Storer; Joanna Calo
- Starring: Jeremy Allen White; Ebon Moss-Bachrach; Ayo Edebiri; Lionel Boyce; Liza Colón-Zayas; Abby Elliott; Matty Matheson; Edwin Lee Gibson
- Composers: Jeffrey Qaiyum; Johnny Iguana; Christian Lundberg
- Country of origin: United States
- Original language: English
- No. of seasons: 5
- No. of episodes: 47

Production
- Executive producers: Joanna Calo; Josh Senior; Christopher Storer; Hiro Murai; Nate Matteson; Matty Matheson; Tyson Bidner; Cooper Wehde; Rene Gube
- Producers: Tyson Bidner; Carrie Holt de Lama; David Woods; Duccio Fabbri
- Production location: Chicago, Illinois
- Cinematography: Adam Newport-Berra; Andrew Wehde; Chloe Weaver
- Editors: Joanna Naugle; Adam Epstein; Megan Mancini; Nia Imani
- Running time: 20–70 minutes
- Production company: FXP

Original release
- Network: FX on Hulu
- Release: June 23, 2022 – June 25, 2026

The Bear is an American comedy-drama television series created by Christopher Storer for FX on Hulu. Jeremy Allen White stars as Carmy Berzatto, an award-winning chef who returns to his hometown of Chicago to manage the chaotic kitchen at his recently deceased brother's Italian beef sandwich shop. The regular cast includes Ebon Moss-Bachrach, Ayo Edebiri, Lionel Boyce, Liza Colón-Zayas, Abby Elliott, Matty Matheson, and Edwin Lee Gibson.

The first season was released in its entirety on FX on Hulu on June 23, 2022. The second, third and fourth seasons were released in June 2023, June 2024, and June 2025, respectively. A standalone special episode was released on May 5, 2026, starring Moss-Bachrach and Jon Bernthal, and focused solely on their characters. The fifth and final season was released on June 25, 2026.

The series received critical acclaim for its performances, writing, directing, visual style, soundtrack, and production values; however, from season three onwards, the show was also criticized for a shift in tone, uncharacteristic celebrity-cameos and narrative stagnation. Also, many real-life culinary professionals have praised the show for its sense of urgency and realistic depiction of the physical, emotional, and financial demands of restaurant life. The Bear has received many accolades, including 22 Primetime Emmy Awards (including Outstanding Comedy Series) and five Golden Globe Awards (including Best Television Series – Musical or Comedy).

== Premise ==
Talented haute cuisine chef Carmy Berzatto inherits his family's Italian beef sandwich shop after his older brother Michael's suicide. He returns home to Chicago to run it, leaving behind his world of working in Michelin-starred restaurants. He is left to deal with his brother's unresolved debts, a rundown kitchen, and an unruly staff, while dealing with his own pain and family trauma.

== Cast and characters ==
- Jeremy Allen White as Carmen "Carmy" Berzatto, also referred to as "Bear", an award-winning New York City chef de cuisine, who returns to his hometown of Chicago to run his deceased brother Michael's failing Italian beef restaurant, The Original Beef of Chicagoland (more commonly known as "The Beef"). Later, he converts The Beef to a fine dining restaurant called The Bear.
- Ebon Moss-Bachrach as Richard "Richie" Jerimovich, also referred to as "Cousin", Michael's best friend, the de facto manager of the restaurant; later maître d'hôtel of The Bear.
- Ayo Edebiri as Sydney "Syd" Adamu, a talented young chef who joins The Beef as its new sous-chef under Carmy.
- Lionel Boyce as Marcus Brooks, The Beef's bread-baker-turned-pastry-chef, spurred on by Sydney's and Carmy's mentoring.
- Liza Colón-Zayas as Tina Marrero, an acerbic and stubborn line cook who eventually embraces the opportunity to train professionally.
- Abby Elliott as Natalie "Sugar" Berzatto, Carmy's and Michael's sister, the reluctant co-owner and business manager of The Beef/The Bear.
- Matty Matheson as Neil Fak (seasons 2–5, recurring season 1), a quirky childhood friend of the Berzattos, and occasional handyman for the restaurant.
- Edwin Lee Gibson as Ebraheim (seasons 4–5, recurring seasons 1–3), a Somali veteran line cook at The Beef who is close with Tina.

== Episodes ==
The storyline of The Bear is subdivided into parts marked by onscreen title cards. The Part II title card appears in the first episode of season 2. The Part III title card appears in the first episode of season 3, which concludes with a "to be continued" card. Christopher Storer told reporters in 2023, "Season 2 is sort of where the show properly begins, once we've met everyone and seen their backstory." Each season is somewhat distinct from the others in "structure, tone, and approach to plot and character."

There is an opening credits sequence, each with a distinct montage and song selection, in episode 7 "Review," episode 14 "Fishes," episode 17 "Omelette," and episode 20 "Next." The mean running time is 35 minutes per episode. The episode with the shortest runtime is "Review" (20 minutes). The longest episode is "Bears" (70 minutes). Total running time including "Gary" is 27 hours, 42 minutes.

Season	Episodes	Originally released
1	8	June 23, 2022
2	10	June 22, 2023
3	10	June 26, 2024
4	10	June 25, 2025
Special		May 5, 2026
5	8	June 25, 2026

=== Season 1 (2022) ===
No. overall	No. in season	Title	Directed by	Written by	Original release date	Prod. code
1	1	"System"	Christopher Storer	Christopher Storer	June 23, 2022	XCBV1001
2	2	"Hands"	Christopher Storer	Christopher Storer	June 23, 2022	XCBV1002
3	3	"Brigade"	Joanna Calo	Christopher Storer	June 23, 2022	XCBV1003
4	4	"Dogs"	Christopher Storer	Sofya Levitsky-Weitz	June 23, 2022	XCBV1004
5	5	"Sheridan"	Joanna Calo	Karen Joseph Adcock	June 23, 2022	XCBV1005
6	6	"Ceres"	Joanna Calo	Catherine Schetina & Rene Gube	June 23, 2022	XCBV1006
7	7	"Review"	Christopher Storer	Joanna Calo	June 23, 2022	XCBV1007
8	8	"Braciole"	Christopher Storer	Christopher Storer & Joanna Calo	June 23, 2022	XCBV1008

=== Season 2 (2023) ===
No. overall	No. in season	Title	Directed by	Written by	Original release date	Prod. code
9	1	"Beef"	Christopher Storer	Christopher Storer	June 22, 2023	XCBV2001
10	2	"Pasta"	Christopher Storer	Joanna Calo	June 22, 2023	XCBV2002
11	3	"Sundae"	Joanna Calo	Karen Joseph Adcock & Catherine Schetina	June 22, 2023	XCBV2003
12	4	"Honeydew"	Ramy Youssef	Stacy Osei-Kuffour	June 22, 2023	XCBV2004
13	5	"Pop"	Joanna Calo	Sofya Levitsky-Weitz	June 22, 2023	XCBV2005
14	6	"Fishes"	Christopher Storer	Joanna Calo & Christopher Storer	June 22, 2023	XCBV2006
15	7	"Forks"	Christopher Storer	Alex Russell	June 22, 2023	XCBV2007
16	8	"Bolognese"	Christopher Storer	Rene Gube	June 22, 2023	XCBV2008
17	9	"Omelette"	Christopher Storer	Joanna Calo & Christopher Storer	June 22, 2023	XCBV2009
18	10	"The Bear"	Christopher Storer	Kelly Galuska	June 22, 2023	XCBV2010

=== Season 3 (2024) ===
No. overall	No. in season	Title	Directed by	Written by	Original release date	Prod. code
19	1	"Tomorrow"	Christopher Storer	Story by : Christopher Storer & Matty Matheson; Teleplay by : Christopher Storer	June 26, 2024	XCBV3001
20	2	"Next"	Christopher Storer	Story by : Christopher Storer & Courtney Storer; Teleplay by : Christopher Storer	June 26, 2024	XCBV3002
21	3	"Doors"	Duccio Fabbri	Story by : Christopher Storer & Will Guidara; Teleplay by : Christopher Storer	June 26, 2024	XCBV3003
22	4	"Violet"	Christopher Storer	Christopher Storer	June 26, 2024	XCBV3004
23	5	"Children"	Christopher Storer	Christopher Storer	June 26, 2024	XCBV3005
24	6	"Napkins"	Ayo Edebiri	Catherine Schetina	June 26, 2024	XCBV3006
25	7	"Legacy"	Joanna Calo	Christopher Storer	June 26, 2024	XCBV3007
26	8	"Ice Chips"	Christopher Storer	Joanna Calo	June 26, 2024	XCBV3008
27	9	"Apologies"	Christopher Storer	Alex Russell	June 26, 2024	XCBV3009
28	10	"Forever"	Christopher Storer	Christopher Storer	June 26, 2024	XCBV3010

=== Season 4 (2025) ===
No. overall	No. in season	Title	Directed by	Written by	Original release date	Prod. code
29	1	"Groundhogs"	Christopher Storer	Christopher Storer	June 25, 2025	XCBV4001
30	2	"Soubise"	Christopher Storer and Duccio Fabbri	Catherine Schetina	June 25, 2025	XCBV4002
31	3	"Scallop"	Christopher Storer	Rene Gube	June 25, 2025	XCBV4003
32	4	"Worms"	Janicza Bravo	Ayo Edebiri & Lionel Boyce	June 25, 2025	XCBV4004
33	5	"Replicants"	Christopher Storer	Karen Joseph Adcock	June 25, 2025	XCBV4005
34	6	"Sophie"	Christopher Storer	Christopher Storer	June 25, 2025	XCBV4006
35	7	"Bears"	Christopher Storer	Joanna Calo	June 25, 2025	XCBV4007
36	8	"Green"	Christopher Storer	Joanna Calo & Christopher Storer	June 25, 2025	XCBV4008
37	9	"Tonnato"	Christopher Storer	Joanna Calo & Christopher Storer	June 25, 2025	XCBV4009
38	10	"Goodbye"	Christopher Storer	Christopher Storer	June 25, 2025	XCBV4010

=== Special (2026) ===
Surprise prequel episode that follows Richie and Mikey on a day trip to Gary, Indiana.

No. overall	Title	Directed by	Written by	Original release date	Prod. code
39	"Gary"	Christopher Storer	Jon Bernthal & Ebon Moss-Bachrach	May 5, 2026	XCMV2026001

=== Season 5 (2026) ===
No. overall	No. in season	Title	Directed by	Written by	Original release date	Prod. code
40	1	"Soda"	Christopher Storer	Christopher Storer	June 25, 2026	XCBV5001
41	2	"Lamb"	Christopher Storer	Rene Gube & Karen Joseph Adcock	June 25, 2026	XCBV5002
42	3	"Mint"	Christopher Storer	Karen Joseph Adcock	June 25, 2026	XCBV5003
43	4	"Ribs"	Christopher Storer	Catherine Schetina	June 25, 2026	XCBV5004
44	5	"Raspberries"	Duccio Fabbri	Rachel Wiggins	June 25, 2026	XCBV5005
45	6	"Focaccia"	Christopher Storer	Rene Gube	June 25, 2026	XCBV5006
46	7	"Caramel"	Christopher Storer	Christopher Storer & Nicole Kohut	June 25, 2026	XCBV5007
47	8	"The Original Beef of Chicagoland"	Christopher Storer	Christopher Storer	June 25, 2026	XCBV5008

== Production ==
=== Development ===
FX ordered a pilot for The Bear in March 2021, to be written and directed by series creator Christopher Storer. Storer had initially conceived The Bear as a feature film before being convinced the story needed time to unreel. The pilot was filmed in July 2021. FX then ordered the series in October 2021 for a 2022 premiere. The sandwich shop interior is copied from the Chicago shop Mr. Beef on Orleans Street, in River North. Storer was a frequent patron and is a friend of Christopher Zucchero, the shop's current owner who inherited it from his father.

In July 2022, the series was renewed for a 10-episode second season. In November 2023, it was renewed for a third season. In March 2024, the series was renewed for a fourth season. Parts of the fourth season were filmed during filming for the third season, with production set to restart in 2025. In July 2025, it was renewed for a fifth and final season of eight episodes.

=== Writing ===
The Bear of the title refers to an actual bear that appears in a dream sequence in the pilot episode, Carmy's nickname "Bear" (derived from his surname), the Chicago Bears and the Chicago Cubs, maybe the whole city metonymically, the name of the new restaurant, Carmy's girlfriend's nickname, the collective noun for the extended family, and can be interpreted as a metaphor for trauma. The show's themes include masculinity and father figures, team sports and collaboration, menswear and good taste, filmmaking and creativity, addiction and intergenerational transfer of maladaptive behaviors, the importance of a good wine list, the importance of strong institutions, the importance of regulatory easing for small business owners, gentrification and class warfare, Catholic mysticism, scars and ghosts and grief, women without men, mothers and women laboring, women in the workplace, dreams, and love.

Creative Screenwriting magazine wrote in 2025, "...the dialogue in The Bear unfurls as poetry—a meditation, a stream of consciousness, a series of fragmented thoughts. It's messy, natural speech." The dialogue is rich with profanity—one reviewer described it as a "symphony of swearing." Dialogue is, by and large, "tightly scripted." However, scenes with guest stars are often filmed as unscripted one-take improvs, for instance Daniel Boulud training Carmy, Brie Larson's Francie Fak schooling her brothers, and Moss-Bachrach's Richie talking 1970s rhythm and blues at Koney King ("Romantic hot-dog place you've got here.") The show's indirect expository style leans on subtext and implication, and nudges the audience to do "investigative work" about narrative details: "Where exactly were the characters eating, what were they wearing, how were they cooking?"

=== Filming ===
The show films in Chicago, including on location in neighborhoods such as River North, Ukrainian Village, and Wicker Park, and at real Chicago restaurants, including Mr. Beef, Ever, and Kasama. Recurring visual and thematic motifs include time and trains. They typically shoot for "about 39 days" or an average of about four days per episode.

=== Cinematography ===
The show's primary cinematographer is Andrew Wehde. A-camera operator Gary Malouf and B-camera operator Chris Dame had both worked with Storer and Wehde on their previous projects. The show is shot with digital Alexa Mini LF cameras and Panavision lenses. Two flashback episodes, "Fishes" and "Gary", were shot using film. The show frequently uses handheld cameras.

=== Notable production staff ===
Jeanie Bacharach is The Bear casting director. The Bear's lead costume designer is Courtney Wheeler; assistant costume designer is Lariana Santiago. Ally Vickers heads the hair department. The production designer is Merje Veski. Eric Frankel heads the set decoration department. The Chicago-based prop master is Laura Roeper, sister of Chicago Sun-Times film critic Richard Roeper. The art director is Lisa Korpan. The Ballbreaker video game was designed by Brooklyn-based game designer and artist Diego E. Garcia.

The show's culinary producer, responsible for the food of The Bear, is co-executive producer Courtney Storer, sister of creator Chris Storer. C. J. Capace is culinary co-producer. The culinary production team includes chef Justin Selk, Nicole Biyani, Danielle Stefanick, Gabriel Wallace, Jeffrey Thomas, and chef Brian Lockwood. Chicago artist Denise Dietz and Abacuc Rodriguez of The Bear art department created Carmy's food illustrations and journal sketches.

The film editors who cut the episodes are Joanna Naugle, Adam Epstein, and Megan Mancini. Scott D. Smith has led the sound mixing team since the pilot episode. Steve "Major" Giammaria is the supervising sound editor. Evan Benjamin is the sound editor for dialogue. The color grading is done by Christian Rush and Mishel Hassidim.

=== Music ===
The Bear soundtrack features 1970s, 1980s, 1990s, and 2000s alternative and mainstream rock, pop, folk, and punk, chosen by Storer and executive producer Josh Senior. Several songs featured on the show include Chicago-based Wilco with "Spiders (Kidsmoke)", "Impossible Germany", and "Handshake Drugs", Radiohead's "Let Down", Pearl Jam's "Animal" and "Come Back", John Mayer's "Last Train Home", Refused's "New Noise", The Breeders' "Saints", Erasure's "A Little Respect", The Replacements' "Bastards of Young", Counting Crows' "Have You Seen Me Lately?", Genesis' "In Too Deep", John Mellencamp's "Check It Out", R.E.M.'s "Oh My Heart", "Half a World Away", and "Finest Worksong", Weezer's "The Christmas Song", "In the Garage", and "Getchoo", The Smashing Pumpkins' "Disarm", Led Zeppelin's "That's the Way", Oasis' "Stay Young", The Decemberists' "The Crane Wife 3" and "A Beginning Song", and Taylor Swift's "Taylor's version" of "Love Story", "Long Live", and "Style". Kim Deal, Chrissie Hynde, Brian Eno, John Cale, David Byrne, Lindsey Buckingham, Stevie Nicks, Van Morrison, Otis Redding, Carole King, Mavis Staples, and Darlene Love make a fair few appearances. The show has an evident affection for cover versions, live-concert versions, B-sides, and demo versions, in part because they are sometimes less expensive to license, and in part, per Senior, "they are different enough for you to think about them a little." Regarding concert tracks, Senior told a music writer in 2023, "We do try and build around the fact that you can hear audience and applause and a little bit more distance between the performer and the microphone. I think those songs always feel more real and authentic when we try and put them in and around our dialogue and sound design."

The show's principal composers are Chicagoans Jeffrey "JQ" Qaiyum and Johnny Iguana, whose instrumentals play primarily over "back of house" scenes. In 2025, Iguana told an interviewer, "JQ is a wizard producer. He makes the beats", and described himself as the "chords and notes guy". Nine Inch Nails songs and instrumentals by composers Trent Reznor and Atticus Ross are prevalent during the run of episodes from "Forks" to "Forever". Season 3 introduced opera and classical music onto the soundtrack. The season 5 score was composed by Christian Lundberg of Bleeding Fingers Music, and produced by Bleeding Fingers co-founder Hans Zimmer.

The songs used in the trailers are "Via Chicago" by Wilco for season 1, "Strange Currencies (Remix)" by R.E.M. and "If You Want Blood (You've Got It)" by AC/DC for season 2, "Mixed Emotions" by the Rolling Stones for season 3, "Fast Slow Disco" by St. Vincent for season 4, and "Love, Reign o'er Me" by The Who for season 5.

== Release ==
The Bear premiered on FX on Hulu in the United States on June 23, 2022, and became available internationally in the Star hub on Disney+. The 10-episode second season was released on June 22, 2023. Along with other Hulu content, The Bear became available to stream on Disney+ in the U.S. via the Hulu hub on December 6, 2023. The third season was released on June 26, 2024. The fourth season was released on June 25, 2025. A surprise special flashback episode, "Gary", was released on May 5, 2026, on Hulu. The fifth season was released on June 25, 2026, on FX on Hulu, with a weekly broadcast on FX beginning the same day, making it the first returning FX on Hulu series to receive a simultaneous broadcast on FX following a change in the latter's programming release strategy. The series dropped a new tranche of episodes every year for five years, "on the same week of June...no small accomplishment" for a streaming series.

== Reception ==
=== Critical response ===
Critical response of The Bear
Season	Rotten Tomatoes	Metacritic
1	100% (82 reviews)	88 (24 reviews)
2	99% (112 reviews)	92 (43 reviews)
3	89% (103 reviews)	80 (45 reviews)
4	84% (86 reviews)	72 (40 reviews)
5	97% (77 reviews)	82 (28 reviews)

The Bear has received critical acclaim. (Note: Multiple references, including:) On the review aggregator website Rotten Tomatoes, the overall series holds a 93% rating, with an average of rated reviews of 8.3/10. On Metacritic, which uses a weighted average, the overall series has received a score of 83 out of 100.

==== Season 1 ====
For the first season, Rotten Tomatoes reported an approval rating of 100% based on 82 critic reviews, with an average of rated review of 8.7/10. The website's critics consensus reads, "Like an expertly confected sandwich, The Bear assembles a perfect melange of ingredients and stacks them for optimal satisfaction—and thankfully keeps the crust-iness for extra flavor." Metacritic gave it a weighted average score of 88 out of 100 based on 24 critic reviews.

The American Film Institute (AFI) named it one of the ten best television programs of the year. The Guardian named it number one of the best 100 TV shows of 2022 and described it as "the best workplace drama since Mad Men". The Bear appeared in the top 10 on numerous publications' "Best of 2022" lists, including first for The A.V. Club, BBC, People, and TVLine, among others.

==== Season 2 ====
On Rotten Tomatoes, 99% of 112 critic reviews are positive, with an average of rated review of 9.3/10 for the second season. The site's critical consensus reads, "Instead of reinventing the menu, The Bear's second season wisely opts to toss its lovable characters into another frying pan of adversity, lets 'em cook, and serves up yet another supremely satisfying dish." Metacritic assigned it a weighted average score of 92 out of 100 based on 43 critic reviews.

For the second year in a row, the AFI named The Bear one of the ten best television programs of the year. The Bear appeared on many publications' lists of the best TV shows of 2023, including Rolling Stone, The New York Times, The Hollywood Reporter, and People, among others.

==== Season 3 ====
On Rotten Tomatoes, 89% of 103 critics gave the third season a positive review, with an average of rated review of 7.9/10. The website's critics consensus states, "Having set an exceedingly high standard of excellence for itself, The Bear spends its third season simmering, stewing, and giving off an aroma that whets the appetite." The website also reported that the season was "as audacious as ever" and it "still seems to continue delivering compelling and often intense television with performances that are so dependably brilliant that they're not even mentioned in most of the reviews. Instead, at this point in a show's life, it's easier to find faults in its sameness or changes, or in its attempts to repeat or outdo itself." Metacritic assigned it a weighted average score of 80 out of 100 based on 45 critic reviews.

==== Season 4 ====
On Rotten Tomatoes, 84% of 86 critics gave the fourth season a positive review, with an average of rated review of 7.3/10. The website's critics consensus reads, "After simmering for too long, The Bear's fourth season finally turns the heat back up with a renewed sense of urgency, serving a rich meal despite tiresome wait times between courses." Metacritic assigned it a weighted average score of 72 out of 100 based on 40 critic reviews.

==== Season 5 ====
On Rotten Tomatoes, 97% of 77 critics gave the fifth season a positive review, with an average of rated reviews of 8.2/10. The website's critics consensus reads, "The Bear closes out its final season with the character-driven finesse that it started with, ensuring its story and fans are served the finest of televisual meals without diminished returns." Metacritic assigned it a weighted average score of 82 out of 100 based on 28 reviews.

=== Accolades ===
Year	Award	Category	Nominee(s)	Result	Ref.
2022	American Film Institute Awards	Top 10 Programs of the Year	The Bear	Won (Note: This award does not have a single winner, but recognizes multiple programs.)	
2022	Gotham Awards	Outstanding Performance in a New Series	Ayo Edebiri	Nominated	
2022	People's Choice Awards	Favorite Bingeworthy Show of 2022	The Bear	Nominated	
2023	AACTA International Awards	Best Drama Series	The Bear	Nominated	
2023	AACTA International Awards	Best Actor in a Series	Jeremy Allen White	Nominated	
2023	American Film Institute Awards	Top 10 Television Programs	The Bear	Won	
2023	Astra TV Awards	Best Streaming Series, Comedy	The Bear	Nominated	
2023	Astra TV Awards	Best Actor in a Streaming Series, Comedy	Jeremy Allen White	Won	
2023	Astra TV Awards	Best Supporting Actor in a Streaming Series, Comedy	Ebon Moss-Bachrach	Nominated	
2023	Astra TV Awards	Best Supporting Actress in a Streaming Series, Comedy	Ayo Edebiri	Won (Note: Tied with Christina Ricci for Wednesday.)	
2023	Astra TV Awards	Best Directing in a Streaming Series, Comedy	Christopher Storer (for "Review")	Nominated	
2023	Astra TV Awards	Best Writing in a Streaming Series, Comedy	Christopher Storer (for "System")	Won	
2023	Astra Creative Arts TV Awards	Best Casting in a Comedy Series	The Bear	Nominated	
2023	Astra Creative Arts TV Awards	Best Guest Actor in a Comedy Series	Jon Bernthal	Nominated	
2023	Black Reel Television Awards	Outstanding Supporting Performance, Comedy Series	Ayo Edebiri	Nominated	
2023	British Academy Television Awards	Best International Programme	The Bear	Nominated	
2023	British Film Editors Cut Above Awards	Best Edited Series: Drama	Joanna Naugle, Adam Epstein	Won	
2023	Cinema Audio Society Awards	Outstanding Achievement in Sound Mixing for Television Series – Half Hour	Scott D. Smith, Steve Giammaria, Patrick Christensen, Ryan Collison, Connor Nagy (for "Review")	Nominated	
2023	Critics' Choice Awards	Best Comedy Series	The Bear	Nominated	
2023	Critics' Choice Awards	Best Actor in a Comedy Series	Jeremy Allen White	Won	
2023	Critics' Choice Awards	Best Supporting Actress in a Comedy Series	Ayo Edebiri	Nominated	
2023	Directors Guild of America Awards	Outstanding Directorial Achievement in Comedy Series	Christopher Storer (for "Review")	Nominated	
2023	Dorian TV Awards	Best TV Comedy	The Bear	Nominated	
2023	Dorian TV Awards	Best Supporting TV Performance – Comedy	Ayo Edebiri	Won	
2023	Golden Globe Awards	Best Television Series – Musical or Comedy	The Bear	Nominated	
2023	Golden Globe Awards	Best Actor in a Television Series – Musical or Comedy	Jeremy Allen White	Won	
2023	Golden Reel Awards	Outstanding Achievement in Sound Editing – Broadcast Short Form	Steve "Major" Giammaria, Jonathan Fuhrer, Evan Benjamin, Annie Taylor, Leslie Bloome (for "Review")	Won	
2023	Independent Spirit Awards	Best New Scripted Series	The Bear	Won	
2023	Independent Spirit Awards	Best Supporting Performance in a New Scripted Series	Ayo Edebiri	Won	
2023	Independent Spirit Awards	Best Supporting Performance in a New Scripted Series	Ebon Moss-Bachrach	Nominated	
2023	Primetime Emmy Awards	Outstanding Comedy Series	The Bear	Won	
2023	Primetime Emmy Awards	Outstanding Lead Actor in a Comedy Series	Jeremy Allen White (for "Braciole")	Won	
2023	Primetime Emmy Awards	Outstanding Supporting Actor in a Comedy Series	Ebon Moss-Bachrach (for "Ceres")	Won	
2023	Primetime Emmy Awards	Outstanding Supporting Actress in a Comedy Series	Ayo Edebiri (for "Review")	Won	
2023	Primetime Emmy Awards	Outstanding Directing for a Comedy Series	Christopher Storer (for "Review")	Won	
2023	Primetime Emmy Awards	Outstanding Writing for a Comedy Series	Christopher Storer (for "System")	Won	
2023	Primetime Creative Arts Emmy Awards	Outstanding Guest Actor in a Comedy Series	Jon Bernthal (for "Braciole")	Nominated	
2023	Primetime Creative Arts Emmy Awards	Outstanding Guest Actor in a Comedy Series	Oliver Platt (for "Dogs")	Nominated	
2023	Primetime Creative Arts Emmy Awards	Outstanding Production Design for a Narrative Program (Half-Hour)	Sam Lisenco, Eric Dean, and Emily Carte (for "System")	Nominated	
2023	Primetime Creative Arts Emmy Awards	Outstanding Casting for a Comedy Series	Jeanie Bacharach, Jennifer Rudnicke, Mickie Paskal, AJ Links	Won	
2023	Primetime Creative Arts Emmy Awards	Outstanding Picture Editing for a Single-Camera Comedy Series	Joanna Naugle (for "System")	Won	
2023	Primetime Creative Arts Emmy Awards	Outstanding Sound Editing for a Comedy or Drama Series (Half-Hour) and Animation	Steve "Major" Giammaria, Evan Benjamin, Jonathan Fuhrer, Annie Taylor, Chris White, Leslie Bloome, Shaun Brennan (for "Review")	Won	
2023	Primetime Creative Arts Emmy Awards	Outstanding Sound Mixing for a Comedy or Drama Series (Half-Hour) and Animation	Steve "Major" Giammaria, Scott D. Smith (for "Review")	Won	
2023	Producers Guild of America Awards	Outstanding Producer of Episodic Television, Comedy	The Bear	Won	
2023	Satellite Awards	Best Drama Series	The Bear	Nominated	
2023	Satellite Awards	Best Actor in a Drama / Genre Series	Jeremy Allen White	Nominated	
2023	Set Decorators Society of America Awards	Best Achievement in Décor/Design of a Half-Hour Single-Camera Series	Eric Frankel, Merje Veski	Nominated	
2023	Screen Actors Guild Awards	Outstanding Performance by an Ensemble in a Comedy Series	Lionel Boyce, Liza Colón-Zayas, Ayo Edebiri, Abby Elliott, Edwin Lee Gibson, Corey Hendrix, Matty Matheson, Ebon Moss-Bachrach, and Jeremy Allen White	Nominated	
2023	Screen Actors Guild Awards	Outstanding Performance by a Male Actor in a Comedy Series	Jeremy Allen White	Won	
2023	Television Critics Association Awards	Program of the Year	The Bear	Nominated	
2023	Television Critics Association Awards	Outstanding New Program	The Bear	Won	
2023	Television Critics Association Awards	Outstanding Achievement in Comedy	The Bear	Won	
2023	Television Critics Association Awards	Individual Achievement in Comedy	Ayo Edebiri	Nominated	
2023	Television Critics Association Awards	Individual Achievement in Comedy	Jeremy Allen White	Nominated	
2023	Writers Guild of America Awards	Comedy Series	Karen Joseph Adcock, Joanna Calo, Rene Gube, Sofya Levitsky-Weitz, Alex O'Keefe, Catherine Schetina, Christopher Storer	Won	
2023	Writers Guild of America Awards	New Series	Karen Joseph Adcock, Joanna Calo, Rene Gube, Sofya Levitsky-Weitz, Alex O'Keefe, Catherine Schetina, Christopher Storer	Nominated	
2023	Writers Guild of America Awards	Episodic Comedy	Joanna Calo and Christopher Storer (for "Braciole")	Nominated	
2024	AACTA International Awards	Best Comedy Series	The Bear	Won	
2024	AACTA International Awards	Best Actor in a Series	Jeremy Allen White	Won	
2024	AARP Movies for Grownups Awards	Best Actor	Oliver Platt	Nominated	
2024	American Film Institute Awards	Top 10 Television Programs	The Bear	Won	
2024	Artios Awards	Outstanding Achievement in Casting – Television Comedy Pilot or First Season	Jeanie Bacharach, Mickie Paskal, Jennifer Rudnicke, AJ Links	Won	
2024	American Cinema Editors	Best Edited Single-Camera Comedy Series	Joanna Naugle (for "Fishes")	Won	
2024	American Cinema Editors	Best Edited Single-Camera Comedy Series	Adam Epstein (for "Forks")	Nominated	
2024	American Society of Cinematographers Awards	Outstanding Achievement in Cinematography in Episode of a Half Hour Series for Television	Andrew Wehde (for "The Bear")	Nominated	
2024	Art Directors Guild Awards	Excellence in Production Design for a Half Hour Single-Camera Television Series	Merje Veski (for "Omelette")	Nominated	
2024	Astra TV Awards	Best Streaming Series, Comedy	The Bear	Nominated	
2024	Astra TV Awards	Best Actor in a Streaming Series, Comedy	Jeremy Allan White	Won	
2024	Astra TV Awards	Best Actress in a Streaming Series, Comedy	Ayo Edebiri	Nominated	
2024	Astra TV Awards	Best Supporting Actor in a Streaming Series, Comedy	Ebon Moss-Bachrach	Won	
2024	Astra TV Awards	Best Supporting Actor in a Streaming Series, Comedy	Matty Matheson	Nominated	
2024	Astra TV Awards	Best Supporting Actor in a Streaming Series, Comedy	Oliver Platt	Nominated	
2024	Astra TV Awards	Best Supporting Actress in a Streaming Series, Comedy	Abby Elliott	Nominated	
2024	Astra TV Awards	Best Supporting Actress in a Streaming Series, Comedy	Liza Colón-Zayas	Nominated	
2024	Astra TV Awards	Best Guest Actor in a Streaming Series, Comedy	Bob Odenkirk	Nominated	
2024	Astra TV Awards	Best Guest Actor in a Streaming Series, Comedy	Jon Bernthal	Won	
2024	Astra TV Awards	Best Guest Actress in a Streaming Series, Comedy	Jamie Lee Curtis	Won	
2024	Astra TV Awards	Best Guest Actress in a Streaming Series, Comedy	Olivia Colman	Nominated	
2024	Astra TV Awards	Best Guest Actress in a Streaming Series, Comedy	Sarah Paulson	Nominated	
2024	Astra TV Awards	Best Directing in a Streaming Series, Comedy	Christopher Storer (for "Fishes")	Won	
2024	Astra TV Awards	Best Writing in a Streaming Series, Comedy	Christopher Storer (for "Fishes")	Nominated	
2024	Black Reel Awards	Outstanding Lead Performance in a Comedy Series	Ayo Edebiri	Won	
2024	Black Reel Awards	Outstanding Supporting Performance in a Comedy Series	Lionel Boyce	Nominated	
2024	Black Reel Awards	Outstanding Guest Performance in a Comedy Series	Robert Townsend	Nominated	
2024	Black Reel Awards	Outstanding Writing in a Comedy Series	Stacy Osei-Kuffour (for "Honeydew")	Nominated	
2024	British Academy Television Awards	Best International Programme	The Bear	Nominated	
2024	British Film Editors Cut Above Awards	Best Edited Series: Drama	Joanna Naugle, Adam Epstein, Nia Imani, Megan Mancini	Won	
2024	Cinema Audio Society Awards	Outstanding Achievement in Sound Mixing for Television Series – Half Hour	Scott D. Smith, Steve "Major" Giammaria, Patrick Christensen, Ryan Collison (for "Forks")	Won	
2024	Costume Designers Guild Awards	Excellence in Contemporary Television	Courtney Wheeler (for "Fishes")	Nominated	
2024	Critics' Choice Television Awards	Best Comedy Series	The Bear	Won	
2024	Critics' Choice Television Awards	Best Actor in a Comedy Series	Jeremy Allen White	Won	
2024	Critics' Choice Television Awards	Best Actress in a Comedy Series	Ayo Edebiri	Won	
2024	Critics' Choice Television Awards	Best Supporting Actor in a Comedy Series	Ebon Moss-Bachrach	Won	
2024	Directors Guild of America Awards	Outstanding Directing – Comedy Series	Christopher Storer (for "Fishes")	Won	
2024	Directors Guild of America Awards	Outstanding Directing – Comedy Series	Ramy Youssef (for "Honeydew")	Nominated	
2024	Golden Globe Awards	Best Television Series – Musical or Comedy	The Bear	Won	
2024	Golden Globe Awards	Best Actor – Television Series Musical or Comedy	Jeremy Allen White	Won	
2024	Golden Globe Awards	Best Actress – Television Series Musical or Comedy	Ayo Edebiri	Won	
2024	Golden Globe Awards	Best Supporting Actor – Series, Miniseries or Television Film	Ebon Moss-Bachrach	Nominated	
2024	Golden Globe Awards	Best Supporting Actress – Series, Miniseries or Television Film	Abby Elliott	Nominated	
2024	Golden Reel Awards	Outstanding Achievement in Sound Editing – Broadcast Short Form	Steve "Major" Giammaria, Andrea Bella, Matt Snedecor, Evan Benjamin, John Werner, John Bowen, Annie Taylor, Leslie Bloome, Shaun Brennan (for "Fishes")	Nominated	
2024	Golden Reel Awards	Outstanding Achievement in Music Editing – Broadcast Short Form	Jason Lingle, Jeff Lingle (for "Fishes")	Nominated	
2024	Make-Up Artists and Hair Stylists Guild Awards	Best Contemporary Make-Up in a Television Series, Limited, Miniseries, or Movie for Television	Ignacia Soto-Aguilar, Nicole Rogers	Nominated	
2024	Make-Up Artists and Hair Stylists Guild Awards	Best Contemporary Hair Styling in a Television Series, Limited, Miniseries, or Movie for Television	Ally Vickers, Angela Brasington, Melanie Shaw	Nominated	
2024	NAACP Image Awards	Outstanding Supporting Actress in a Comedy Series	Ayo Edebiri	Won	
2024	People's Choice Awards	The Show of the Year	The Bear	Nominated	
2024	People's Choice Awards	The Comedy Show of the Year	The Bear	Nominated	
2024	People's Choice Awards	The Male TV Star of the Year	Jeremy Allen White	Nominated	
2024	People's Choice Awards	The Comedy TV Star of the Year	Jeremy Allen White	Won	
2024	People's Choice Awards	The TV Performance of the Year	Ayo Edebiri	Nominated	
2024	Primetime Emmy Awards	Outstanding Comedy Series	The Bear	Nominated	
2024	Primetime Emmy Awards	Outstanding Lead Actor in a Comedy Series	Jeremy Allen White (for "The Bear")	Won	
2024	Primetime Emmy Awards	Outstanding Lead Actress in a Comedy Series	Ayo Edebiri (for "Sundae")	Nominated	
2024	Primetime Emmy Awards	Outstanding Supporting Actor in a Comedy Series	Lionel Boyce (for "Honeydew")	Nominated	
2024	Primetime Emmy Awards	Outstanding Supporting Actor in a Comedy Series	Ebon Moss-Bachrach (for "Forks")	Won	
2024	Primetime Emmy Awards	Outstanding Supporting Actress in a Comedy Series	Liza Colón-Zayas (for "Pop")	Won	
2024	Primetime Emmy Awards	Outstanding Directing for a Comedy Series	Christopher Storer (for "Fishes")	Won	
2024	Primetime Emmy Awards	Outstanding Directing for a Comedy Series	Ramy Youssef (for "Honeydew")	Nominated	
2024	Primetime Emmy Awards	Outstanding Writing for a Comedy Series	Christopher Storer and Joanna Calo (for "Fishes")	Nominated	
2024	Primetime Creative Arts Emmy Awards	Outstanding Guest Actor in a Comedy Series	Jon Bernthal (for "Fishes")	Won	
2024	Primetime Creative Arts Emmy Awards	Outstanding Guest Actor in a Comedy Series	Bob Odenkirk (for "Fishes")	Nominated	
2024	Primetime Creative Arts Emmy Awards	Outstanding Guest Actor in a Comedy Series	Will Poulter (for "Honeydew")	Nominated	
2024	Primetime Creative Arts Emmy Awards	Outstanding Guest Actress in a Comedy Series	Olivia Colman (for "Forks")	Nominated	
2024	Primetime Creative Arts Emmy Awards	Outstanding Guest Actress in a Comedy Series	Jamie Lee Curtis (for "Fishes")	Won	
2024	Primetime Creative Arts Emmy Awards	Outstanding Production Design for a Narrative Program (Half-Hour)	Eric Frankel, Lisa Korpan, and Merje Veski (for "Omelette")	Nominated	
2024	Primetime Creative Arts Emmy Awards	Outstanding Casting for a Comedy Series	Jeanie Bacharach, Maggie Bacharach, Jennifer Rudnicke, Mickie Paskal, AJ Links	Won	
2024	Primetime Creative Arts Emmy Awards	Outstanding Cinematography for a Single-Camera Series (Half-Hour)	Andrew Wehde (for "Forks")	Won	
2024	Primetime Creative Arts Emmy Awards	Outstanding Contemporary Costumes for a Series	Steven "Rage" Rehage, Lariana Santiago, Courtney Wheeler (for "Fishes")	Nominated	
2024	Primetime Creative Arts Emmy Awards	Outstanding Contemporary Hairstyling	Angela Brasington, Melanie Shaw, Ally Vickers (for "Fishes")	Nominated	
2024	Primetime Creative Arts Emmy Awards	Outstanding Contemporary Makeup (Non-Prosthetic)	Justine Losoya, Zsofia Otvos, Nicole Rogers, Ignacia Soto-Aguilar (for "Fishes")	Nominated	
2024	Primetime Creative Arts Emmy Awards	Outstanding Picture Editing for a Single-Camera Comedy Series	Joanna Naugle (for "Fishes")	Won	
2024	Primetime Creative Arts Emmy Awards	Outstanding Sound Editing for a Comedy or Drama Series (Half-Hour) and Animation	Steve "Major" Giammaria, Andrea Bella, Evan Benjamin, Jonathan Fuhrer, Annie Taylor, Jason Lingle, Jeff Lingle, Leslie Bloome, Shaun Brennan (for "Forks")	Won	
2024	Primetime Creative Arts Emmy Awards	Outstanding Sound Mixing for a Comedy or Drama Series (Half-Hour) and Animation	Steve "Major" Giammaria, Scott D. Smith, Patrick Christensen, Ryan Collison (for "Forks")	Won	
2024	Producers Guild of America Awards	Danny Thomas Award for Outstanding Producer of Episodic Television, Comedy	The Bear	Won	
2024	Satellite Awards	Best Comedy or Musical Series	The Bear	Nominated	
2024	Satellite Awards	Best Actor – Comedy or Musical Series	Jeremy Allen White	Won	
2024	Satellite Awards	Best Actress – Comedy or Musical Series	Ayo Edebiri	Nominated	
2024	Screen Actors Guild Awards	Outstanding Performance by an Ensemble in a Comedy Series	Lionel Boyce, Jose Cervantes Jr, Liza Colón-Zayas, Ayo Edebiri, Abby Elliott, Richard Esteras, Edwin Lee Gibson, Molly Gordon, Corey Hendrix, Matty Matheson, Ebon Moss-Bachrach, Oliver Platt and Jeremy Allen White	Won	
2024	Screen Actors Guild Awards	Outstanding Performance by a Male Actor in a Comedy Series	Jeremy Allen White	Won	
2024	Screen Actors Guild Awards	Outstanding Performance by a Male Actor in a Comedy Series	Ebon Moss-Bachrach	Nominated	
2024	Screen Actors Guild Awards	Outstanding Performance by a Female Actor in a Comedy Series	Ayo Edebiri	Won	
2024	Set Decorators Society of America Awards	Best Achievement in Décor/Design of a Half-Hour Single-Camera Series	Eric Frankel, Merje Veski	Nominated	
2024	Television Critics Association Awards	Program of the Year	The Bear	Nominated	
2024	Television Critics Association Awards	Outstanding Achievement in Comedy	The Bear	Nominated	
2024	Television Critics Association Awards	Individual Achievement in Comedy	Ayo Edebiri	Nominated	
2024	Television Critics Association Awards	Individual Achievement in Comedy	Jeremy Allen White	Nominated	
2024	Writers Guild of America Awards	Comedy Series	Karen Joseph Adcock, Joanna Calo, Kelly Galuska, Rene Gube, Sofya Levitsky-Weitz, Stacy Osei-Kuffour, Alex Russell, Catherine Schetina, Christopher Storer	Won	
2024	Writers Guild of America Awards	Episodic Comedy	Joanna Calo and Christopher Storer (for "Fishes")	Nominated	
2024	Writers Guild of America Awards	Episodic Comedy	Alex Russell (for "Forks")	Nominated	
2025	AACTA International Awards	Best Comedy Series	The Bear	Won	
2025	AACTA International Awards	Best Actor in a Series	Jeremy Allen White	Nominated	
2025	AACTA International Awards	Best Actress in a Series	Ayo Edebiri	Nominated	
2025	American Cinema Editors Awards	Best Edited Single-Camera Comedy Series	Joanna Naugle (for "Tomorrow")	Nominated	
2025	Artios Awards	Outstanding Achievement in Casting – Television Comedy Series	Jeanie Bacharach, Mickie Paskal, Jennifer Rudnicke, AJ Links, Kaitlin Shaw	Nominated	
2025	Cinema Audio Society Awards	Outstanding Achievement in Sound Mixing for Television Series – Half Hour	Scott D. Smith, Steve "Major" Giammaria, Patrick Christensen, Kendall Barron, Ryan Collison, Connor Nagy (for "Doors")	Won	
2025	Critics' Choice Television Awards	Best Supporting Actress in a Comedy Series	Liza Colón-Zayas	Nominated	
2025	Directors Guild of America Awards	Outstanding Directing – Comedy Series	Ayo Edebiri (for "Napkins")	Nominated	
2025	Directors Guild of America Awards	Outstanding Directing – Comedy Series	Duccio Fabbri (for "Doors")	Nominated	
2025	Directors Guild of America Awards	Outstanding Directing – Comedy Series	Christopher Storer (for "Tomorrow")	Nominated	
2025	Golden Globe Awards	Best Television Series – Musical or Comedy	The Bear	Nominated	
2025	Golden Globe Awards	Best Actor – Television Series Musical or Comedy	Jeremy Allen White	Won	
2025	Golden Globe Awards	Best Actress – Television Series Musical or Comedy	Ayo Edebiri	Nominated	
2025	Golden Globe Awards	Best Supporting Actor – Series, Miniseries or Television Film	Ebon Moss-Bachrach	Nominated	
2025	Golden Globe Awards	Best Supporting Actress – Series, Miniseries or Television Film	Liza Colón-Zayas	Nominated	
2025	Golden Reel Awards	Outstanding Achievement in Sound Editing – Broadcast Short Form	Steve "Major" Giammaria, Jonathan Fuhrer, Matt Snedecor, Craig LoGiudice, John Bowen, Evan Benjamin, Annie Taylor, Leslie Bloome, Shaun Brennan ()for "Doors"	Nominated	
2025	Golden Reel Awards	Outstanding Achievement in Music Editing – Broadcast Short Form	Jason Lingle, Jeff Lingle (for "Doors")	Nominated	
2025	Primetime Emmy Awards	Outstanding Comedy Series	The Bear	Nominated	
2025	Primetime Emmy Awards	Outstanding Lead Actor in a Comedy Series	Jeremy Allen White (for "Tomorrow")	Nominated	
2025	Primetime Emmy Awards	Outstanding Lead Actress in a Comedy Series	Ayo Edebiri (for "Legacy")	Nominated	
2025	Primetime Emmy Awards	Outstanding Supporting Actor in a Comedy Series	Ebon Moss-Bachrach (for "Doors")	Nominated	
2025	Primetime Emmy Awards	Outstanding Supporting Actress in a Comedy Series	Liza Colón-Zayas (for "Napkins")	Nominated	
2025	Primetime Emmy Awards	Outstanding Directing for a Comedy Series	Ayo Edebiri (for "Napkins")	Nominated	
2025	Primetime Creative Arts Emmy Awards	Outstanding Guest Actor in a Comedy Series	Jon Bernthal (for "Napkins")	Nominated	
2025	Primetime Creative Arts Emmy Awards	Outstanding Guest Actress in a Comedy Series	Olivia Colman (for "Forever")	Nominated	
2025	Primetime Creative Arts Emmy Awards	Outstanding Guest Actress in a Comedy Series	Jamie Lee Curtis (for "Ice Chips")	Nominated	
2025	Primetime Creative Arts Emmy Awards	Outstanding Casting for a Comedy Series	Jeanie Bacharach, Maggie Bacharach, Jennifer Rudnicke, and Mickie Paskal	Nominated	
2025	Primetime Creative Arts Emmy Awards	Outstanding Single-Camera Picture Editing for a Comedy Series	Joanna Naugle (for "Tomorrow")	Nominated	
2025	Primetime Creative Arts Emmy Awards	Outstanding Sound Editing for a Comedy or Drama Series (Half-Hour)	Steve "Major" Giammaria, Craig LoGiudice, Evan Benjamin, John Bowen, Jonathan Fuhrer, Matt Snedecor, Annie Taylor, Jeff Lingle, Jason Lingle, Leslie Bloome, and Shaun Brennan (for "Doors")	Nominated	
2025	Primetime Creative Arts Emmy Awards	Outstanding Sound Mixing for a Comedy or Drama Series (Half-Hour) and Animation	Scott D. Smith, Steve "Major" Giammaria, Patrick Christensen, and Ryan Collison (for "Doors")	Nominated	
2025	Satellite Awards	Best Actor in a Comedy or Musical Series	Jeremy Allen White	Nominated	
2025	Satellite Awards	Best Actress in a Comedy or Musical Series	Ayo Edebiri	Nominated	
2025	Satellite Awards	Best Actor in a Supporting Role in a Series, Miniseries & Limited Series, or Motion Picture Made for Television	Ebon Moss-Bachrach	Nominated	
2025	Screen Actors Guild Awards	Outstanding Performance by an Ensemble in a Comedy Series	Lionel Boyce, Liza Colón-Zayas, Ayo Edebiri, Abby Elliott, Edwin Lee Gibson, Corey Hendrix, Matty Matheson, Ebon Moss-Bachrach, Ricky Staffieri, and Jeremy Allen White	Nominated	
2025	Screen Actors Guild Awards	Outstanding Performance by a Male Actor in a Comedy Series	Jeremy Allen White	Nominated	
2025	Screen Actors Guild Awards	Outstanding Performance by a Female Actor in a Comedy Series	Liza Colón-Zayas	Nominated	
2025	Screen Actors Guild Awards	Outstanding Performance by a Female Actor in a Comedy Series	Ayo Edebiri	Nominated	
2026	AACTA International Awards	Best Comedy Series	The Bear	Nominated	
2026	American Cinema Editors Awards	Best Edited Single-Camera Comedy Series	Joanna Naugle (for "Bears")	Nominated	
2026	Actor Awards	Outstanding Performance by an Ensemble in a Comedy Series	Lionel Boyce, Liza Colón-Zayas, Ayo Edebiri, Abby Elliott, Edwin Lee Gibson, Corey Hendrix, Andrew Lopez, Matty Matheson, Ebon Moss-Bachrach, Oliver Platt, Sarah Ramos, Ricky Staffieri, and Jeremy Allen White	Nominated	
2026	British Academy Television Awards	Best International Programme	The Bear	Nominated	
2026	Directors Guild of America Awards	Outstanding Directing – Comedy Series	Janicza Bravo (for "Worms")	Nominated	
2026	Directors Guild of America Awards	Outstanding Directing – Comedy Series	Christopher Storer (for "Bears")	Nominated	
2026	Golden Globe Awards	Best Television Series – Musical or Comedy	The Bear	Nominated	
2026	Golden Globe Awards	Best Actor in a Television Series – Musical or Comedy	Jeremy Allen White	Nominated	
2026	Golden Globe Awards	Best Actress in a Television Series – Musical or Comedy	Ayo Edebiri	Nominated	
2026	NAACP Image Awards	Outstanding Actress in a Comedy Series	Ayo Edebiri	Nominated	
2026	Writers Guild of America Awards	Episodic Comedy	Ayo Edebiri & Lionel Boyce (for "Worms")	Nominated	
2026	Primetime Emmy Awards	Outstanding Comedy Series	The Bear	Nominated	
2026	Primetime Emmy Awards	Outstanding Lead Actress in a Comedy Series	Ayo Edebiri	Nominated	
2026	Primetime Emmy Awards	Outstanding Directing for a Comedy Series	Christopher Storer (for "Bears")	Nominated	
2026	Primetime Creative Arts Emmy Awards	Outstanding Guest Actor in a Comedy Series	Rob Reiner (for "Tonnato")	Won	
2026	Primetime Creative Arts Emmy Awards	Outstanding Guest Actress in a Comedy Series	Jamie Lee Curtis (for "Tonnato")	Nominated	
2026	Primetime Creative Arts Emmy Awards	Outstanding Cinematography for a Single-Camera Series (Half-Hour)	Andrew Wehde (for "Scallop")	Nominated	
2026	Primetime Creative Arts Emmy Awards	Outstanding Picture Editing for a Single-Camera Comedy Series	Joanna Naugle (for "Bears")	Nominated	
2026	Primetime Creative Arts Emmy Awards	Outstanding Sound Mixing for a Comedy or Drama Series (Half-Hour) and Animation	Steve "Major" Giammaria, Scott D. Smith, Patrick Christensen, Ryan Collison, Connor Nagy (for "Scallop")	Nominated	

==== Genre classification ====
The classification of The Bear as a comedy in certain award ceremonies, specifically the Primetime Emmys, has attracted criticism, given its dramatic style and focus on heavy topics including suicide, alcoholism, familial trauma, and workplace dysfunction. (Note: Multiple references, including:) Proponents of the series' categorization as a "comedy" argue the show unfolds as a dark comedy marked by ridiculous situations and comedic timing, relies on the comedic effect inherent to chaos, is a comedy of errors, and is heavily characterized by back-and-forth banter or snark. The New York Times described it as a comedy "in the classical sense, in that it emphasizes human foibles and does not end in disaster."

In 2024, the series became the most-nominated series in comedy categories at the Emmys with 23 nominations, surpassing 30 Rock which had 22 nominations in 2009. However, it went on to lose the award for Outstanding Comedy Series, which it had been heavily favored to win, to Hacks, with The Hollywood Reporter suggesting there was an insult among voters over its continued classification as a comedy. In June 2025, Vulture published an article claiming that "an undercurrent of industry resentment" over the show's lack of comedic content led to its 2024 Comedy Series Emmy loss.

=== Viewership ===
==== Season 1 ====
The streaming aggregator Reelgood, which monitors real-time data from 5 million users in the U.S. for original and acquired streaming programs and movies across subscription video-on-demand (SVOD) and ad-supported video-on-demand (AVOD) services, reported that The Bear was the second-most-streamed program during the week of July 13. It later rose to become the most-streamed program for the week of July 22, before ranking as the seventh most-streamed during the week of July 27. JustWatch, a guide to streaming content with access to data from more than 20 million users around the world, estimated that The Bear was the second most-streamed series in the U.S. during the week ending July 3. It maintained the same position during the week ending July 17. FX announced that the first season of The Bear was the most-watched comedy series in the network's history.

==== Season 2 ====
FX reported that the second season of The Bear was the most-watched season premiere in the network's history. Reelgood calculated that The Bear was the second most-streamed program in the U.S. during the week of June 22. It later rose to first place during the week of June 29. JustWatch reported that The Bear was the most-streamed series in the U.S. during the week ending June 25. Whip Media, which tracks viewership data for the more than 25 million worldwide users of its TV Time app, announced that The Bear was the eighth most-watched streaming original television series of 2023.

==== Season 3 ====
The season 3 premiere of The Bear garnered 5.4 million views in its first four days of streaming, marking the best performance for an FX premiere on Hulu and the most-watched season premiere for any scripted series on the platform. This viewership represents a 24% increase over the season 2 premiere and accounts for streaming on Hulu, Hulu on Disney+ in the U.S., and Disney+ in available international territories. The Bear achieved the third-largest season premiere for Hulu overall and the biggest Hulu on Disney+ premiere since the bundle's launch on March 27. Nielsen Media Research, which records streaming viewership on U.S. television screens, calculated that The Bear was watched for 1,233 million minutes from June 24–30. It surpassed its previous peak of 1.01 billion minutes recorded shortly after the premiere of its second season the previous year. JustWatch reported that The Bear was the third most-streamed show in the U.S. in 2024, while in Canada, it ranked as the second most-streamed show of the year.

==== Season 4 ====
The premiere of The Bear's fourth season was the seventh most-streamed title in the U.S. according to Nielsen, it hit 917 million minutes watched from June 23–29, marking a drop of about 24% from the 1.2 billion minutes reached during the third season's premiere the year before.

== Sources ==
- Nikolova, Zlatina (July 2025). "'Every second counts': Urban affect and culinary chaos in The Bear". The Journal of Popular Television. 13 (1): 43–59. doi:10.1386/jptv_00135_1. ISSN 2046-9861.
- Singer, Christoph (2026). "The chef and the city: Mobile masculinities in Chef and The Bear". Journal of Urban Cultural Studies. 13 (1): 119–132. doi:10.1386/jucs_00114_1. ISSN 2050-9790.
