= Adam Epstein =

American film editor

Adam Epstein is an American film editor. He has been nominated for two Emmy Awards, in 2013 and 2017, for his work editing Saturday Night Live. He has been nominated for an American Cinema Editors award and won two British Film Editors awards for his work on the TV series The Bear. Before joining The Bear, he had worked for executive producer Josh Senior's post-production company on an array of projects, including a John Mulaney stand-up special. He also worked as editor on the TV series Documentary Now!
