= Jimmy Kalinowski =

Fictional character, The Bear TV series

- Oliver Platt as Uncle Jimmy in season 2
- First appearance: "Hands"; June 23, 2022
- Last appearance: "The Original Beef of Chicagoland"; June 25, 2026
- Created by: Christopher Storer
- Portrayed by: Oliver Platt

In-universe information
- Full name: James Kalinowski
- Nicknames: Uncle Jimmy; Cicero

James Kalinowski, also known as Uncle Jimmy or Cicero, is a fictional character on the FX Network television series The Bear. Created by Christopher Storer and played by Oliver Platt, Jimmy is a businessman who was best friends with the father of the Berzatto kids, before he left. Initially possessed of a modest fortune of unidentified origin, Jimmy generously funds the notional small-business ideas of his dissipated but beloved nephew Mikey Berzatto.

== Biography ==
Like many members of the extended Berzatto family, Jimmy is cantankerous and profane, but he also carries around a carefully shielded "heart of gold." Jimmy had a longstanding business arrangement, under the name KBL Electric, with "Pop" Berzatto (the dad of the Berzatto kids and, once upon a time, Jimmy's best friend), and Lee Lane (Bob Odenkirk), who later becomes Donna Berzatto's (Jamie Lee Curtis) occasional boyfriend. The KBL is the initials of their last names: Kalinowski–Berzatto–Lane. Jimmy maintains a friendship with Donna and looks out for the fatherless Berzatto kids. As of 2022, the last time Jimmy had talked to Mr. Berzatto was "about 20 years ago". Under KBL Electric, Jimmy lent Mikey Berzatto (Jon Bernthal) $300,000 to "franchise" the Beef sandwich shop. Mikey squirreled away the money as a gift to his younger brother Carmy (Jeremy Allen White), who had wanted the two brothers to work together to open a new and improved family restaurant. After Mikey's suicide, Carmy finds the money hidden in the restaurant, and plans to turn the Beef into a high-class dining restaurant known as the Bear.

In season 2, after speaking with Carmy, his sister and restaurant project manager Natalie Berzatto (Abby Elliott), and the restaurant's new chef Sydney Adamu (Ayo Edebiri), Jimmy agrees to lend him another $500,000 with the property, valued at approximately $2 million, as collateral. The only stipulation is that Carmy repays Jimmy $850,000 within 18 months, or else the real estate reverts to Jimmy, who can cash out for the roughly $1.15 million in accumulated equity. Natalie later convinces him to lend the restaurant an additional $50,000 for repairs. Jimmy manages to get the restaurant a business license on the night of its soft opening, while warning Carmy about prioritizing the restaurant's best interests.

Throughout season 3, Jimmy criticizes the restaurant and Carmy's excessive spending. He brings in family friend and business consultant Nicholas Marshall (Brian Koppelman), also known as the "Computer", to offer financial advice. Upon seeing the state of the restaurant, Jimmy tells Carmy that, due to the rising costs, if an upcoming Chicago Tribune of the Bear is negative, he will have to back down his investment in the restaurant.

At the beginning of season four, after the negative Tribune review is released, Jimmy has Computer set a two-month countdown clock in the restaurant, emphasizing that Jimmy's patience with Carmy's "fucking fuckery" has run thin. Both Jimmy and Computer agree that getting one Michelin star might be able to save the business. During this time, he is in the process of selling his Wilmette house and "downsizing" to a condo, apparently because of some kind of a personal finance crisis, possibly involving "shorts" and "the market". As the countdown nears its end, Jimmy expresses his pride in Sydney for growing as a chef, and Carmy signs a new agreement leaving ownership of the restaurant to Jimmy, Sydney and Natalie.

In season 5, set after the clock runs out on a stormy Chicago night, Computer encourages Jimmy to franchise the Beef window operated out the side of the Bear, an idea that Ebraheim (Edwin Lee Gibson) had devised with business consultant Albert Schnur (Rob Reiner). Jimmy reveals he has lost most of his money and is attempting to sell the building, but he is having difficulty finding buyers. He additionally tries to save money by cancelling an upcoming wagyu order, much to Sydney's frustration. When he learns that Carmy intends to leave the Bear, he angrily berates him. Jimmy tries to save the business by acquiring the building's air rights. Natalie's lawyer husband Pete Katinsky (Chris Witaske) arrives at the restaurant and helps Jimmy, Computer, and Computer's niece Cheese (Elsie Fisher) with their search for the air rights, but their meeting with the rights owner, Mary Heyman (Deirdre O'Connell), is not successful. Due to his financial failures, Jimmy prepares to sell a beloved watch of his, but Richie Jerimovich (Ebon Moss-Bachrach) stops this from happening by turning the buyer away. In a last-ditch effort, he agrees to move forward with Ebra's plan to franchise the Beef window. After the night of service goes well, and the Bear earns two Michelin stars, Jimmy apologizes to Carmy for his earlier outburst.

=== Occupation ===
He has been described as "suspiciously wealthy" with hints of ties to organized crime, money laundering, or some other flavor of white-collar crime. Screen Rant noted that:

"In many scenes from The Bear, Uncle Jimmy talks about real estate, loans, interest rates, and even the economy, suggesting that he has a real estate business. Perhaps in his early years, he put a lot of money into several properties and business ventures, which are now bringing him substantial returns. There is also a slight possibility that Jimmy has performed political 'activities' at the grassroots level for a local party or cause. He has been doing this for a while and, in return, gets paid a hefty sum by the government authorities he supports."

The CATO Institute asserted that Jimmy is "mobbed up", which seemingly helps the restaurant with permitting and licensing issues in season two. In 2024, Platt hinted that "what you see is not necessarily what you get." Jimmy's nickname, Cicero, evokes Cicero, Illinois, which is "a Chicago suburb historically associated with organized crime. His investment in The Bear suggests the fluid boundary between informal and potentially dubious capital and 'legitimate' entrepreneurial ventures. In this way, the restaurant's transformation is sustained not only by culinary ambition but also by financial networks that reflect Chicago's longstanding entanglement of commerce and criminal mythos."

=== Personal life and relationships ===
As established in "Dogs," Carmy and Jimmy have a warm relationship. In addition to his paternal care for the Berzatto siblings, Jimmy has a mildly antagonistic relationship with Richie. This rift is breached in large part at the restaurant's soft opening, when the staff of the Bear present Jimmy with a chocolate-covered banana for dessert. Jimmy once shared a childhood memory of such a treat with Richie and he remembered, many years later, and had it recreated to honor the restaurant's patron and the family's patrón.

Jimmy used to live in Naperville, then had a big suburban house in Wilmette. As of season 4, Donna was helping Jimmy move into a smaller condo.

== Family ==
Gail (div.?)	James Kalinowski	Carol
		Nicky Kalinowski (b. c. 2010)

Jimmy, who is "unanimously adored" within the family, has been married twice. His first wife was named Gail. The picture of Aunt Gail from "Tonnato" depicts Platt with his real-life wife Camilla Campbell in 1992.

Jimmy has a teenage son, Nicky (Sebastian Merlo), with his current wife Carol (Maura Kidwell).

He had a brother who once gave him a nice watch. Having lost three-quarters of his money on a bad investment, Jimmy sold all his watches for cash in season 5 and was going to sell the watch from his brother, but Richie ran defense and at least forestalled an immediate sale.

== Critical reaction ==
In 2023, White described Platt as bringing the "perfect blend of menace and innocence" to the role. Vulture columnist Marah Eakin wrote about season 1 that Platt was "absolutely killing" the role. Platt has been credited with bringing "charm and illusive authority" to the role.

Chicago gave Platt's Chicago accent an A grade, writing "I thought Uncle Jimmy's accent was the real deal until I realized he was played by Oliver Platt, who isn't from Chicago—or anywhere, really. Platt's father was U.S. ambassador to Pakistan, Zambia, and the Philippines, so he grew up all over the world. Yet he perfectly reproduces a Chicago accent, Baby Boom vintage. He pronounces the significant vowel sounds—the raised 'a' and the elongated 'o'—without ever stretching them into caricatures. He don't do dat dese, dems, and dose t'ing. That's a blue-collar South Side characteristic, which wouldn't suit his character. Masterful dialect acting."

== See also ==
- List of The Bear characters
- List of The Bear episodes
- Food of The Bear
- Music on The Bear
- Family on The Bear

== Sources ==
- Martynuska, Małgorzata (February 2026). "'Every Second Counts': Representing Chicago's Urban Identity in the TV Series The Bear". Perspektywy Kultury. 53 (2). Kraków: Ignatianum University in Cracow: 75–91. ISSN 2081-1446.
