= JAQ (b-boy) =

American professional b-boy, writer and MC

- Born: Jeffrey Ameen Qaiyum; Chicago, Illinois, US
- Other name: JQ
- Occupations: MC, writer, b-boy

Jeffrey Ameen Qaiyum is an American professional b-boy, writer and MC, also known as JQ and JAQ. He performs with his brother, GQ, also a B-Boy professional, as the "Q Brothers."

== Biography ==
Qaiyum was born and raised in Chicago, Illinois. He is of mixed ethnic background, having a Pakistani father and a European American mother of German descent. Qaiyum later moved to New York City, where he honed his skills as a producer and MC. He was the composer and DJ for the off-broadway musical comedy, The Bomb-itty of Errors.

He was the composer and co-star of MTV's Scratch and Burn, which he created with his brother GQ and two other colleagues from The Bomb-itty of Errors, Dragon and Jordan. He wrote the score for the New York indie film Just Another Story, which aired on Showtime. His brother GQ wrote, directed and starred in the movie, and the Q brothers were associate producers. Qaiyum co-directed the music video and has a small cameo.

Qaiyum produced the album Smashing for rock/electro/hip-hop trio The Grommits, as well as a solo hip-hop album entitled Foul Mouth Poet. He toured the country extensively with The Grommits for much of 2004, and subsequently became the lead singer of Them Vs. Them, a rock band from Chicago. The Q Brothers are currently working on an album together entitled, The Feel Good Album of the Year, a mix of jazz, heavy metal, R&B, and electronica.

Qaiyum currently lives in Chicago.

Qaiyum provided the voice for Dexter "Dex" Jackson in the Saints Row and Saints Row: Gat Out of Hell.
