= Christopher Zucchero =

American restaurateur who plays Chi-Chi on The Bear TV series

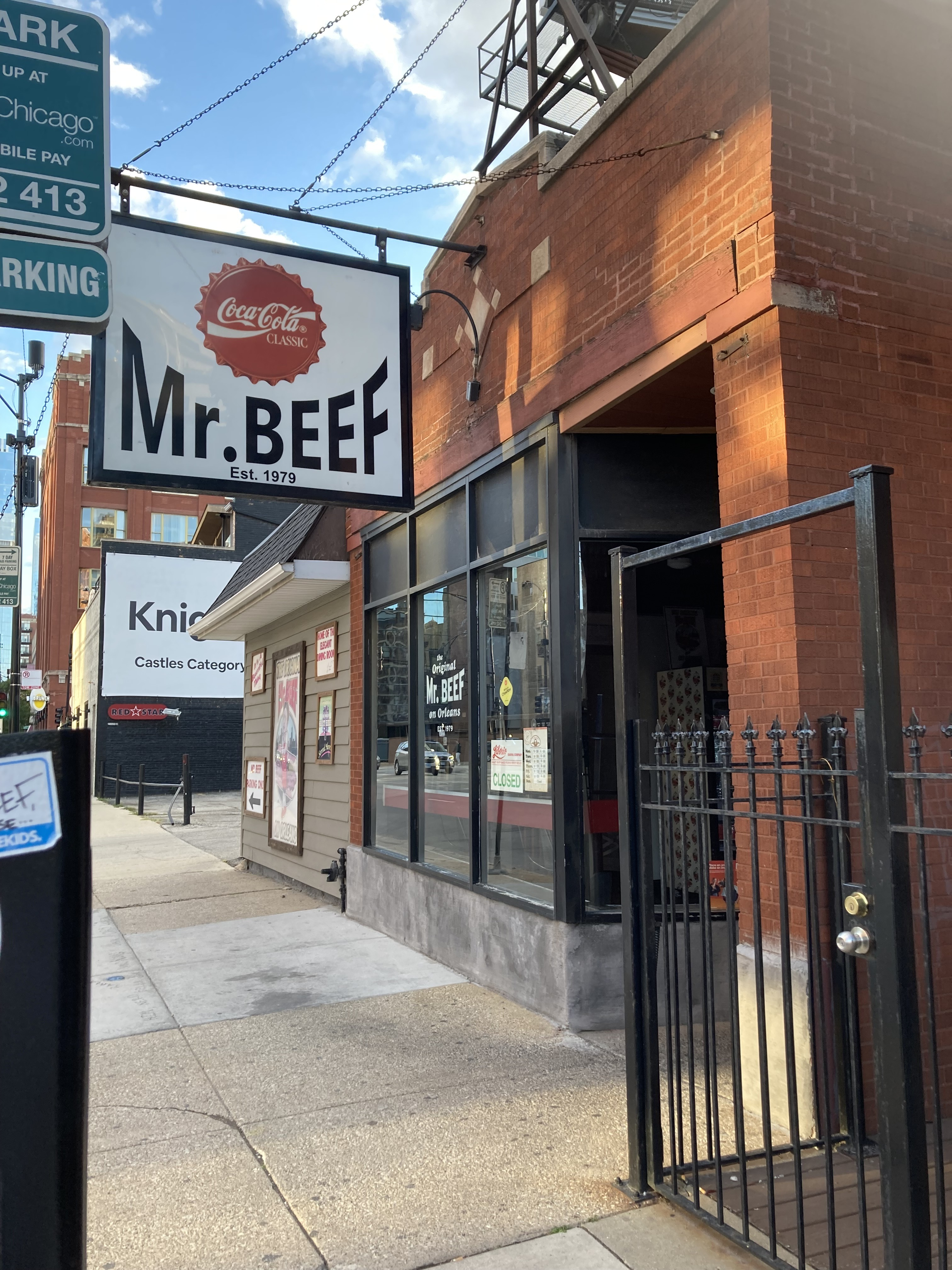
Mr. Beef in Chicago partially inspired the fictional Original Beef of Chicagoland restaurant depicted on The Bear

Christopher Zucchero is an American restaurateur who plays Chi-Chi on The Bear TV series.

According to Edwin Lee Gibson, who plays Ebra: "Christopher Zucchero's dad started Mr. Beef. He's such a lovely guy. Since season one, he's called me his acting coach. He gets so nervous. When he first had the scene with Rob [Reiner], he couldn't even get anything out."

Mr. Beef, opened in 1979, is part of the inspiration for the Original Beef of Chicagoland, the Italian beef sandwich shop owned by the fictional Berzatto family. Zucchero and Bear creator Christopher Storer have been friends since kindergarten. As of 2024, Zucchero has not seen (m)any episodes of the show, telling a reporter:

I don't watch anything with food. I'm around food all day. I've never watched any of Anthony Bourdain's stuff, and I love Tony. Tony was a great guy. He loved my father, he was a nice guy, and I never watched his stuff. I told him to his face one time. So I never wanted to watch The Bear or anything with Mr. Beef in it. Which is also why I'll probably never read your article. No offense to you, you've been lovely, but you can just send it to my wife."

== See also ==
- Paulie James
