= Oliver Platt =

American actor (born 1960)

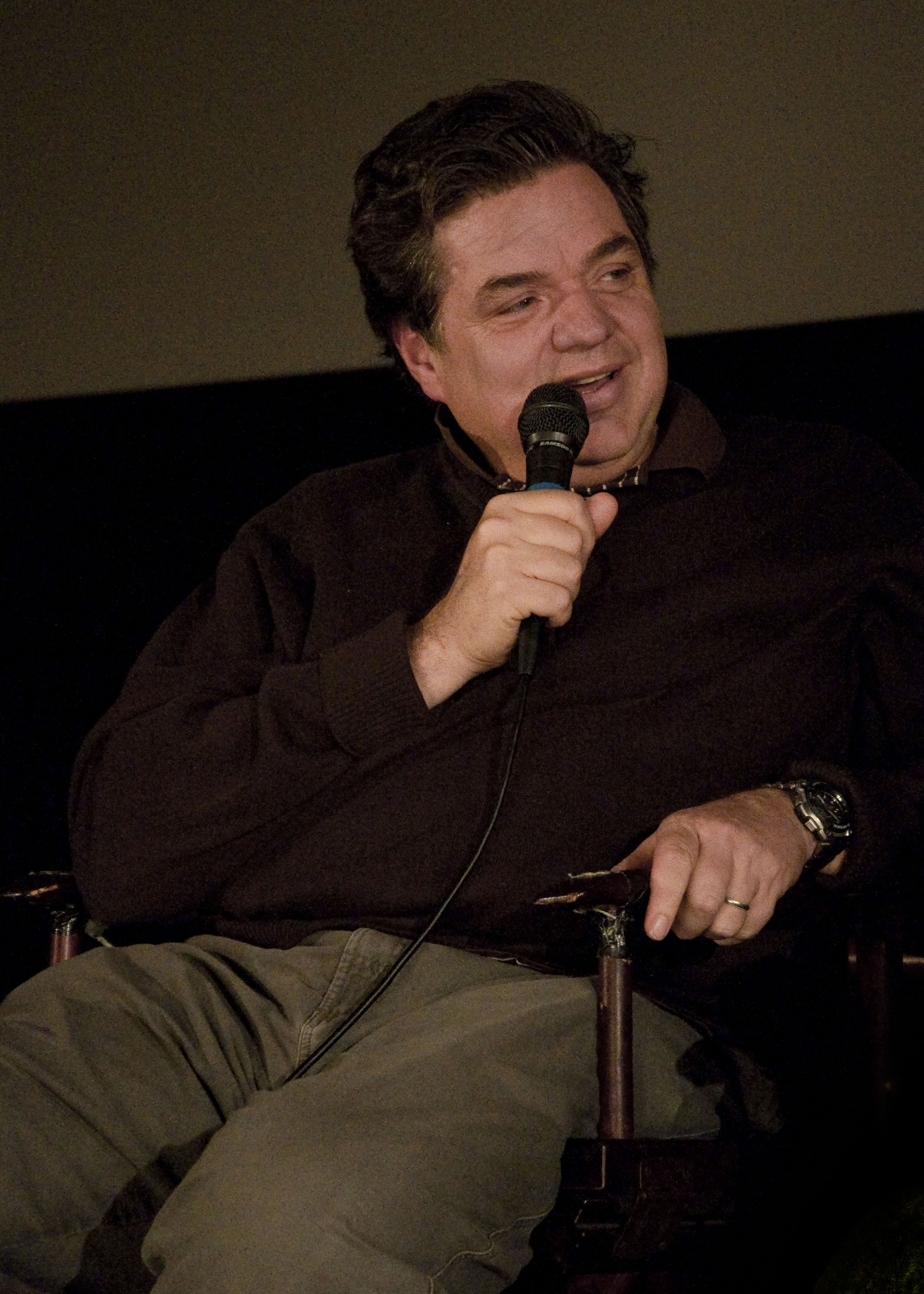
- Platt in 2010
- Born: January 12, 1960 (age 66); Windsor, Ontario, Canada
- Education: Tufts University
- Occupation: Actor
- Years active: 1985–present
- Spouse: Camilla Campbell (m. 1992)
- Children: 3
- Father: Nicholas Platt
- Relatives: Adam Platt (brother)

Oliver Platt (born January 12, 1960) is an American actor known for his work on stage and screen. He has been nominated for five Primetime Emmys, a Golden Globe Award, two Screen Actors Guild Awards, and one Tony Award.

Following his acting debut in the 1988 film Married to the Mob, Platt gained prominence for his roles in Working Girl (1988), Flatliners (1990), Beethoven (1992), Indecent Proposal, Benny & Joon, The Three Musketeers (all 1993), A Time to Kill (1996), The Impostors, Bulworth, Dr. Dolittle (all 1998), Lake Placid, Three to Tango, and Bicentennial Man (all 1999). His other notable credits include Gun Shy, Ready to Rumble (both 2000), Don't Say a Word (2001), Pieces of April (2003), Kinsey (2004), The Ice Harvest, Casanova (both 2005), Frost/Nixon (2008), Year One, 2012 (both 2009), Please Give, Love & Other Drugs (both 2010), and X-Men: First Class (2011).

Platt is known for his work on television series such as The Big C (2010–2013), Fargo (2014) and The Good Wife (2015). He received a Screen Actors Guild Award nomination for his portrayal of George Steinbrenner in the ESPN miniseries The Bronx Is Burning (2007) as well as nominations for the Primetime Emmy for Outstanding Guest Actor for his roles in The West Wing (2001), Huff (2005; 2006), and Nip/Tuck (2008). He is known for his recurring role as Uncle Jimmy on Hulu's The Bear (2022–2026) and has played Dr. Daniel Charles on Chicago Med since 2015.

On stage, Platt made his Broadway debut in the Conor McPherson play Shining City (2006) for which he was nominated for the Tony Award for Best Actor. He returned to Broadway playing Nathan Detroit in the 2009 revival of the Frank Loesser musical Guys and Dolls.

== Early life and education ==
=== Family ===
Platt was born on January 12, 1960, in Windsor, Ontario, Canada, to American parents Sheila Maynard, a clinical social worker and Nicholas Platt, a career diplomat who served as U.S. ambassador to Pakistan, Zambia and the Philippines. His older brother, Adam Platt, is a New York magazine restaurant critic. They returned to the United States when Platt was three months old.

Platt's paternal great-grandfather was artist and architect Charles A. Platt, and his maternal great-grandparents were equestrian Arthur Scott Burden (of the industrialist Burden family) and socialite Cynthia Roche. Platt is also a great-great-grandson of General Robert Shaw Oliver (through his mother). Platt's paternal great-great-grandfather was diplomat and lawyer Joseph Hodges Choate. Choate was the most successful lawyer in New York City during the Gilded Age and was later appointed U.S. Ambassador to the United Kingdom by President William McKinley. His brother William Gardner Choate, who was also a prominent lawyer and federal judge, created Choate Rosemary Hall.

=== Early life ===
Because of his father's career as a foreign service officer, much of Platt's childhood was spent in Asia and Washington, D.C. Platt attended twelve different schools, including the American School in Japan, and has said "Even now I find myself envying people who have neighborhoods and roots." Platt's family made frequent trips back to Washington, where they held Redskins season tickets. Platt is also a fan of the Boston Red Sox.

When he was nine years old, Platt and his family visited the Kennedy Center in Washington, where he watched a performance that helped inspire his acting career. "One of the performances that really made me want to be an actor started out with this probably 20-minute rambling, drunken monologue by this bum. And it was a young Morgan Freeman. I'll never forget it. This guy was just so riveting. He stood there on stage alone before the curtain went up, and he held this audience utterly rapt. Including myself, obviously." According to Platt, drama departments gave his childhood some stability, "It was something of a survival mechanism, in that it gave me a little subculture to plug into wherever I ended up. Kids need that. I certainly did."

=== Education ===
Platt attended a progressive boarding school named Colorado Rocky Mountain School in Carbondale, Colorado. Platt majored in drama at Tufts University, where he met and became close friends with Hank Azaria. He spent three years working in theatre in Boston, Massachusetts, which he said had a "wealth of serious amateur theatre at that time…I played many roles, and it was the best training I could have had." Platt travelled with Shakespeare and Company, based in Lenox, Massachusetts, touring schools to earn his Equity card, before moving to New York. Platt's early career involved Off-Broadway and regional theatre, and he appeared onstage with the New York Shakespeare Festival, Lincoln Center Theater, Manhattan Theatre Club and other companies across many genres. He obtained an agent while working at Manhattan Punch Line Theatre, and met actor Bill Murray at his cousin's Christmas party. Murray attended Platt's show and recommended Platt to director Jonathan Demme, who cast him in Married to the Mob in 1988. Platt attributes his breakthrough to appearing at the Punch Line Theater.

== Career ==
Platt makes his decisions about accepting acting roles based on the role being "different from what I just did...I do have to be interested in the role". After Married to the Mob, he appeared in Working Girl (1988), Flatliners (1990), Beethoven (1992), The Three Musketeers (1993), A Time to Kill (1996), Executive Decision (1996), and Bulworth (1998). In 1998 Platt and Stanley Tucci played two deadbeat actors who improvise with unsuspecting strangers in The Impostors. Tucci and Platt developed the characters while working on a play at Yale University in 1988, with Tucci later completing the screenplay and directing the film.

In 1999, Platt played the wealthy and eccentric crocodile enthusiast Hector in David E. Kelley's Lake Placid, alongside Bill Pullman and Bridget Fonda. Platt described Hector as "pretty abrasive and obnoxious at times, but, I hope, he has a way of growing on you. I think David originally thought of him as a great white hunter sort of guy, but when I signed on for the role he sort of wrote him in a different direction."

The short-lived drama Deadline provided Platt's first lead role on television. Created by Dick Wolf, who also created Law & Order, Deadline focused on the lives of newspaper journalists in New York City. Platt starred as Pulitzer Prize-winning columnist Wallace Benton, an "unlikely hero". The strong cast, which also included Bebe Neuwirth and Hope Davis, could not compensate for substandard writing and the series was soon canceled. After Deadline's failure, Platt avoided work on television until he read a script for The West Wing and signed on for a guest role. He received an Emmy nomination for his portrayal of no-nonsense White House Counsel Oliver Babish, brought in during season two to compile a defense for President Bartlet and others who covered up his non-disclosure of multiple sclerosis.

His role in the television series Huff as Russell Tupper from 2004 to 2006 was well-received, especially by creator Bob Lowry, who said, "Oliver plays an alcoholic, drug-addicted, sexaholic, workaholic, womanizing misogynist who is adorable. I don't know any actor who could do that. I originally saw Russell as a blond stud, but when I saw what Oliver could do, I realized how much better, richer, and less predictable he was than my idea of the character ... Oliver is very committed to the idea that story and dialogue be character-driven and unique". Platt's work was nominated for two Emmy awards and a Golden Globe.

In 2005, Platt acted in Harold Ramis's film The Ice Harvest as an unhappy businessman with a trophy wife and two stepchildren who becomes involved with a friend who has stolen $2 million from a Mafia boss. He also played a lard merchant named Papprizzio in Lasse Hallström's Casanova, who competes with Casanova (Heath Ledger) for marriage to Francesca (Sienna Miller). Platt won the New York Film Critics Online Award for best supporting actor for his role in Casanova.

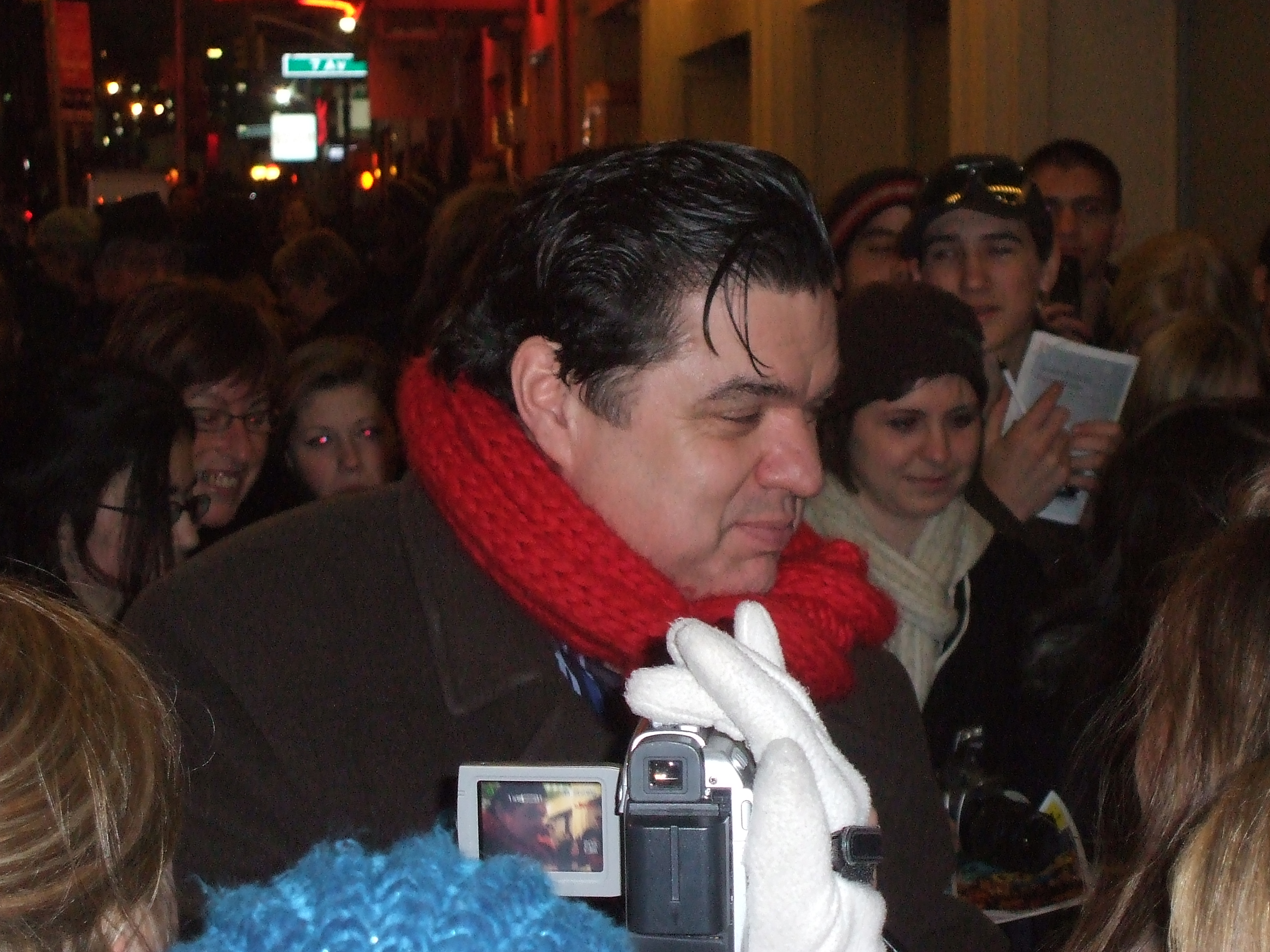
Platt greets fans outside the Nederlander Theatre in Manhattan after a performance of Guys and Dolls on February 21, 2009.

A Broadway production named Shining City was Platt's Broadway debut in 2006. The play was set in Dublin, and Platt's role was the tortured protagonist, John. Shining City's director said, "There is one word to describe Oliver. It's 'humanity.' He's got that everyman quality. He's a contradictory human being with flaws and strengths. And he's loveable. He can simultaneously make you laugh and break your heart. Oliver has brought to the role of John what I expected and more: tremendous inventiveness and sensitivity." Platt visited Dublin to prepare for the role and ensure his performance was authentic. He was nominated for a Tony Award for "Best Performance by a Leading Actor in a Play".

In 2007, Platt played the part of Yankees owner George Steinbrenner in the ESPN mini-series The Bronx Is Burning. Platt signed onto the project after John Turturro was confirmed as Billy Martin, because "This thing lives or dies by that portrayal ... I think it's great casting. God knows he has the intensity." Platt starred in the pilot episode of The Thick of It, a remake of the British show of the same name in 2007. The series was not picked up by ABC. Platt starred as Nathan Detroit, alongside Lauren Graham as Miss Adelaide, in the Broadway revival of Guys and Dolls which began performances at the Nederlander Theatre on February 3, 2009, and officially opened on March 1, 2009. The production closed on June 14, 2009, after 113 performances.

Platt starred as White House Chief of Staff Carl Anheuser in Roland Emmerich's 2012, a disaster film released November 13, 2009. In August 2010, he was cast in the role of "The Man in Black" in 2011's X-Men spin-off, X-Men: First Class, directed by Matthew Vaughn. In 2012, he starred in the romantic comedy The Oranges alongside Hugh Laurie and Leighton Meester and appeared in the action film Chinese Zodiac. He provided the voice of Wiser the Owl in the 2013 animated film Dorothy of Oz. He appeared in Miramax's 2016 supernatural thriller, The 9th Life of Louis Drax.

== Personal life ==
Platt married Mary Camilla Bonsal Campbell on September 12, 1992, at the First Congregational Church in Kittery, Maine. They have three children. As of 1998, Platt had an open airline ticket when filming so he could return home frequently because his family did not accompany him to filming locations. In a 1999 interview, Platt explained that he had chosen to focus on film and television rather than theater because of his family. Platt has a home in North Haven, Maine.

== Filmography ==
=== Film ===
Year	Title	Role	Notes
1988	Married to the Mob	FBI Agent Ed Benitez	
1988	Working Girl	David Lutz	
1989	Crusoe	Mr. Newby	
1990	Flatliners	Randy Steckle	
1990	Postcards from the Edge	Neil Bleene	
1992	Beethoven	Harvey	
1992	Diggstown	Daniel Patrick O'Shannon 'Fitz' Fitzpatrick	
1993	The Temp	Hartsell	
1993	Indecent Proposal	Jeremy	
1993	Benny & Joon	Eric	
1993	The Three Musketeers	Porthos	
1995	Tall Tale	Paul Bunyan	
1995	Funny Bones	Tommy Fawkes	
1995	The Infiltrator	Yaron Svoray	
1996	Executive Decision	Dennis Cahill	
1996	A Time to Kill	Harry Rex Vonner	
1998	Dangerous Beauty	Maffio Venier	
1998	Bulworth	Dennis Murphy	
1998	The Impostors	Maurice	
1998	Dr. Dolittle	Dr. Mark Weller	
1998	Simon Birch	Ben Goodrich	
1999	Lake Placid	Hector Cyr	
1999	Three to Tango	Peter Steinberg	
1999	Bicentennial Man	Rupert Burns	
1999	CinderElmo	Fairy Godperson	
2000	Ready to Rumble	Jimmy 'The King' King	
2000	Gun Shy	Fulvio Nesstra	
2001	Don't Say a Word	Dr. Louis Sachs	
2002	Liberty Stands Still	Victor Wallace	
2002	Ash Wednesday	Moran	
2002	Zig Zag	Mr.Walters / The Toad	
2003	Pieces of April	Jim Burns	
2003	Hope Springs	Doug Reed	
2004	Kinsey	Herman B Wells	
2005	The Ice Harvest	Pete Van Heuten	
2005	Casanova	Paprizzio	
2007	The Ten	Marc Jacobson	
2007	Martian Child	Jeff	
2008	Frost/Nixon	Bob Zelnick	
2009	Wonder Woman	Hades (voice)	Direct-to-DVD
2009	Year One	High Priest	
2009	2012	Carl Anheuser	
2010	Please Give	Alex	
2010	Love & Other Drugs	Bruce Jackson	
2010	Letters to Juliet	Bobby	Uncredited
2011	X-Men: First Class	Man In Black Suit	
2012	The Oranges	Terry Ostroff	
2012	CZ12	Lawrence	
2012	Ginger & Rosa	Activist	
2013	Legends of Oz: Dorothy's Return	Wiser The Owl (voice)	
2013	The Tale of the Princess Kaguya	Lord Minister of The Right Abe (voice)	
2013	Gods Behaving Badly	Apollo	
2013	Lucky Them	Giles	
2014	Chef	Ramsey Michel	
2014	Kill the Messenger	Jerome Ceppos	
2014	Cut Bank	Joe Barrett	
2014	A Merry Friggin' Christmas	Hobo Santa	
2015	Frank and Cindy	Frank Garcia	
2015	One More Time	Alan Sternberg	
2016	The Cleanse	Ken Roberts	
2016	The Ticket	Bob	
2016	The 9th Life of Louis Drax	Dr. Perez	
2016	Shut In	Dr. Wilson	
2016	Rules Don't Apply	Forester	
2017	Professor Marston and the Wonder Women	Max Gaines	
2020	I'm Thinking of Ending Things	The Voice (voice)	
2024	Babes	Bernie	

=== Television ===
Year	Title	Role	Notes
1987	The Equalizer	Norm Jameson	Episode: "In the Money"
1988	Miami Vice	'Speed' Stiles	Episode: "Baseballs of Death"
1990	Wiseguy	Unknown	Episode: "Changes Houses"
1995	The Infiltrator	Yaron	Television movie
2000–2001	Deadline	Wallace Benton	13 episodes
2001–2005	The West Wing	Oliver Babish	8 episodes
2003	Queens Supreme	Judge Jack Moran	13 episodes
2004–2006	Huff	Russell Tupper	25 episodes
2007–2008	Nip/Tuck	Freddy Prune	4 episodes
2007	The Thick of It	Malcolm Tucker	Unsold TV pilot
2007	The Bronx Is Burning	George Steinbrenner	8 episodes
2009–2011	Bored to Death	Richard Antrem	6 episodes
2010–2013	The Big C	Paul Jamison	40 episodes
2012–2018	American Experience	Narrator (voice)	11 episodes
2014	Fargo	Stavros Milos	5 episodes
2014–2017	Sofia the First	Everburn (voice)	2 episodes
2015–2016	Chicago P.D.	Dr. Daniel Charles	9 episodes
2015–2023	Chicago Fire	Dr. Daniel Charles	8 episodes
2015–present	Chicago Med	Dr. Daniel Charles	198 episodes
2015	The Good Wife	R.D.	3 episodes
2015	Bessie	Carl Van Vechten	Television movie
2015–2017	Modern Family	Martin	2 episodes
2016	American Dad!	Documentary Narrator (voice)	Episode: "Next of Pin"
2017	Chicago Justice	Dr. Daniel Charles	2 episodes
2022–2026	The Bear	Uncle Jimmy	27 episodes

=== Theatre ===
Year	Title	Role	Venue
2006	Shining City	John	Biltmore Theatre, Broadway
2009	Guys and Dolls	Nathan Detroit	Nederlander Theatre, Broadway

=== Video games ===
Year	Title	Role
2001	SSX Tricky	Luther-Dwayne Grady
2006	Scarface: The World Is Yours	

== Awards and nominations ==
Year	Award	Category	Work	Result
2001	Primetime Emmy Award	Outstanding Guest Actor in a Drama Series	The West Wing	Nominated
1998	Blockbuster Entertainment Award	Favorite Supporting Actor – Comedy	Dr. Dolittle	Nominated
2005	Boston Society of Film Critics	Best Supporting Actor	The Ice Harvest	Nominated
2005	New York Film Critics Online Award	Best Supporting Actor	Casanova	Won
2005	Boston Society of Film Critics	Best Supporting Actor	Casanova	Nominated
2005	St. Louis Gateway Film Critics Association	Best Supporting Actor	Casanova	Nominated
2005	Golden Globe Award	Best Supporting Actor - Television	Huff	Nominated
2005	Primetime Emmy Award	Outstanding Supporting Actor in a Drama Series	Huff	Nominated
2006	Primetime Emmy Award	Outstanding Supporting Actor in a Drama Series	Huff	Nominated
2006	Tony Award	Best Actor in a Play	Shining City	Nominated
2007	Screen Actors Guild Award	Outstanding Actor in a Miniseries or Television Movie	The Bronx Is Burning	Nominated
2008	Primetime Emmy Award	Outstanding Guest Actor in a Drama Series	Nip/Tuck	Nominated
2008	Screen Actors Guild Award	Outstanding Cast in a Motion Picture	Frost/Nixon	Nominated
2010	Gotham Independent Film Award	Best Ensemble Cast	Please Give	Nominated
2010	Independent Spirit Awards	Robert Altman Award	Please Give	Won
2023	Primetime Emmy Award	Outstanding Guest Actor in a Comedy Series	The Bear	Nominated
2024	Screen Actors Guild Awards	Outstanding Ensemble in a Comedy Series	The Bear	Won
