= Green (The Bear) =

- The Bear episode
- Episode no.: Season 4 Episode 8
- Directed by: Christopher Storer
- Written by: Joanna Calo & Christopher Storer
- Cinematography by: Andrew Wehde
- Editing by: Megan Mancini
- Production code: XCBV4008
- Original air date: June 25, 2025
- Running time: 30 minutes

Guest appearances
- Oliver Platt as Jimmy Kalinowski; Chris Witaske as Pete Katinsky; Molly Gordon as Claire Dunlap; Robert Townsend as Emmanuel Adamu; Will Poulter as Luca; Adam Shapiro as Adam Shapiro; Ricky Staffieri as Ted Fak; Corey Hendrix as Gary "Sweeps" Woods; Sarah Ramos as Chef Jess; Andrew Lopez as Garrett; Rene Gube as Rene; Brian Koppelman as the Computer; Christopher J. Zucchero as Chi-Chi; Paulie James as Chuckie

Episode chronology
← Previous "Bears"	Next → "Tonnato"
- The Bear season 4

"Green" is the eighth episode of the fourth season of the American comedy-drama television series The Bear. It is the 36th overall episode of the series and was written by Joanna Calo & Christopher Storer and directed by series creator Christopher Storer. It was released on Hulu on June 25, 2025, along with the rest of the season.

The series follows Carmen "Carmy" Berzatto (Jeremy Allen White), an award-winning New York City chef de cuisine, who returns to his hometown of Chicago to run his late brother Michael's failing Italian beef sandwich shop. With the financial backing of his uncle Jimmy (Oliver Platt) and help from his cousin Richie (Ebon Moss-Bachrach), sister Sugar (Abby Elliott), and chef Sydney (Ayo Edebiri), Carmy attempts to remodel the dingy Beef into a warm and hospitable fine-dining destination called the Bear.

== Plot ==
Echoing Carmy's cooking-show nightmare from Season 1, Sydney has a dream in which she demonstrates an insanely complex and unattainably expensive dish for a studio audience. It begins pouring rain indoors and a rioting mob breaks in, and she concludes her gritted-teeth monologue with a declaration that if the dish fails "it's no worry at all, no trouble, really. You'll just be a complete waste of space and a failure and a disappointment to anybody who's devoted any time or energy to you." She keeps smiling through the crisis while the camera zooms in on a stuffed blue teddy bear drenched in the studio rain. Then Sydney wakes up on a stage under falling snow in an empty theater, and flees, trailing glitter behind her, and emerges into a hot-looking space where she seems to be running on a treadmill, panicked but getting nowhere. Syd wakes up in her apartment bedroom, bundled into a green sweatshirt, next to a collection of post-it note reminders on the wall-facing window beside her bed.

A montage of dishes from the restaurant, paid bills, and Carmy chopping vegetables is accompanied by the song "I Got You Babe" from Groundhog Day. From a spot along the shore of Lake Michigan, Sydney calls Shapiro (Adam Shapiro) to decline his job offer; he reacts negatively, telling her it is an idiotic decision, and that she will remain a mid-tier chef going down with a sinking ship.

Natalie and Pete (Chris Witaske) enjoy some blissful time cuddling in bed with their infant before a phone call from Donna interrupts the moment. Sydney makes sure her dad (Robert Townsend) is squared away with medication for his heart condition. Luca (Will Poulter) looks for a cookbook in the office and finds a photo of himself, Carmy, and Chef Terry (Olivia Colman) from when they all worked together at Ever. Marcus stands up his estranged father. Tina (Liza Colón-Zayas), who has been struggling to meet the goal of preparing pasta within three minutes, goes to Luca for help. Richie and Sydney stare mournfully at the expiring doomsday clock, they shake hands and agree to "leave it all on the dance floor." The Fak brothers help Sweeps (Corey Hendrix) with a blind taste test of Italian red wines.

In a callback to Carmy cooking expensive Wagyu beef for Chef Terry, and Luca reminiscing that it was very stressful for him to cook Wagyu beef in Carmy's kitchen, Sydney works on cooking Wagyu in the Bear kitchen. She asks Carmy to check her work; he tests for doneness by touch and tells her "five more seconds," which means it's all but perfect. In another callback to his training under Chef Terry, he gives her a spoon as a signifier of trust and empowerment.

Richie tells Jess (Sarah Ramos) about Mikey and the relationship dynamics of the original Beef crew. Sweeps and Sydney go over wine pairings for the evening; he reminds her that "delicious is impressive," which is what she told him while making family meal on her first day staging at the Original Beef of Chicagoland. Carmy and Sydney agree that they have a set nine-course dinner menu, "all hits." Carmy seems to finally be satisfied with his lamb dish, and Sydney makes a point to photograph his plate using her phone's camera. Natalie comes in to complain that Donna is hassling her about a "photo book," Carmy initially has no idea what she is talking about but eventually realizes it's the box of old family photos he found in the basement. Sydney agrees to "hold down the fort" while Carmy delivers the photos to Donna so she stops pestering Sugar. Carmy does not want to go but Syd encourages him to "just get it over with."

Carmy drives to the suburbs in the restaurant's decades-old minivan. He parks on his childhood street, Central Ave., and calls Claire (Molly Gordon). They discuss how the neighborhood is "very much the same," and Claire recalls an incident when Donna almost burned down the Berzatto house. Claire teases Carmy about being nervous sometimes. She hangs up because she has to work but then she calls back to be supportive of him seeing his mom, and in return he tells her he thinks she is wonderful.

Natalie and Computer (Brian Koppelman) go over the Bear's finances, which are improving thanks to wine, Sydney's scallop, and the beef window, but their future is still in peril despite the cost cuts; Computer asks whether the restaurant is worth saving. Natalie looks at the collection of photos of the Bear family on the board in the office and sees a reason to keep going. Box in hand, Carmy then reluctantly approaches Donna's (Jamie Lee Curtis) threshold for the first time in years and knocks on the door.

== Production ==
=== Writing ===
Joanna Calo and Christopher Storer wrote the teleplay for "Green."

=== Filming ===
The episode begins with a dream sequence where Sydney appears as an Ina Garten-esque television-host version of herself. According to the show's sound producer "the wind and water flooding the set, cabinets banging open and shut, and general mayhem, [were] all...actual on-set effects, as opposed to CGI." The sound team thus needed to accommodate "a Ritter fan off to the side that's blowing stuff all over. There are water effects. There's hydraulics slapping the cabinet doors open and closed." The sound team suggested having an overhead boom mic drop into the Barefoot Contessa dream sequence, a nod to the use of such microphones on an actual cooking show. The sound for Sydney's one-shot monologue was recorded on a Sennheiser MKH415 microphone on a Fisher Model 2 boom, along with a body microphone placed on Edebiri, two microphones "rigged above the table," and another microphone "hidden in the tabletop." According to Scott D. Smith, head of The Bear sound recording department, "Somehow, the post sound crew was able to extract something usable from all these sources, without resorting to ADR."

== Reception ==
=== Critical reviews ===
The A.V. Club gave "Green" a B grade, noting "The Bear has one more night of service before the doomsday clock ticks down to zero. But no one's acting like it's an ending—and not because they're in denial. It's because after all the hell they've been through, the Bears are finally seeing things with clear eyes." Vulture rated it four out of five stars, saluting Syd's decision to reject Shapiro as a key moment, especially because her choice triggers Shapiro to criticize her for "'choosing to stay on a ship that's literally sinking,' and while the latter might technically be true, he can fuck right off with that noise. Syd made the decision that was right in her heart and she made it without knowing whatever other sexier, extenuating terms might be in that Docusign. That's how you know she's a ride-or-die Bear, period."

Decider declared Richie "toast" in regard to his feelings for Chef Jess, marveled that Sydney has not had more nightmares considering her emotional investment in the Bear, and wondered "Why did I enjoy this episode?" speculating that it was a lower-key relief after the spectacle of the wedding.

Hello Beautiful columnist Keyaira Boone found the Sydney–Shapiro scene pivotal, writing, "Shapiro promised Sydney autonomy, but his actions prove he isn't capable of seeing her as his professional equal. His performative allyship shadows his every good intention...Shapiro pretended to value Sydney more than he did...Sometimes, a well-meaning white person can be more dangerous than an outwardly hateful one. That said, the Berzattos are broke, and it is truly awful that Sydney has to choose between sustainable income and emotional security."

The Washington Post's Sonia Rao commented "The Barefoot Contessa theme music sets off some sort of Pavlovian response in me. I'm actually also listening to the audiobook of Ina Garten's memoir right now, so that might have been my favorite moment of the entire season. It reminded me of how funny Edebiri can be, too, given her actual background in comedy. Let Sydney be happy!"

== Sources ==
- Smith, Scott D. (Fall 2025). "The Bear: The Challenges of Managing Kitchen Chaos". Production Sound & Video. 17 (4). North Hollywood, California: IATSE 695: 32–37.
