= Worms (The Bear) =

- The Bear episode
- Episode no.: Season 4 Episode 4
- Directed by: Janicza Bravo
- Written by: Ayo Edebiri & Lionel Boyce
- Cinematography by: Andrew Wehde
- Editing by: Joanna Naugle & Megan Mancini
- Production code: XCBV4004
- Original air date: June 25, 2025
- Running time: 32 minutes

Guest appearances
- Danielle Deadwyler as Chantel; Adam Shapiro as Adam Shapiro; Arion King as T.J.

Episode chronology
← Previous "Scallop"	Next → "Replicants"
- The Bear season 4

"Worms" is the fourth episode of the fourth season of the American comedy-drama television series The Bear. It is the 32nd overall episode of the series and was written by Ayo Edebiri & Lionel Boyce and directed by Janicza Bravo. It was released on Hulu on June 25, 2025, along with the rest of the season.

The series follows Carmen "Carmy" Berzatto (Jeremy Allen White), an award-winning New York City chef de cuisine, who returns to his hometown of Chicago to run his late brother Michael's failing Italian beef sandwich shop. With the financial backing of his uncle Jimmy (Oliver Platt) and help from his cousin Richie (Ebon Moss-Bachrach), sister Sugar (Abby Elliott), and chef Sydney (Ayo Edebiri), Carmy attempts to remodel the dingy Beef into warm and hospitable fine-dining destination called the Bear.

The episode takes place on Sydney's day off, beginning when Chef Adam Shapiro (Adam Shapiro) calls and invites her to tour the site of his planned restaurant.

Critics deemed "Worms" one of the stand-out episodes of the fourth season and the year in American television generally, a "series highlight," an instant "hall of fame" installment of the series, and a triumph for co-writer and star Ayo Edebiri, with a story and setting that both showcased her comedy skills and illuminated the often-obscured emotional depths of Sydney Adamu.

== Plot ==
Adam Shapiro (Adam Shapiro) brings Sydney to visit his new restaurant under construction, promising her autonomy and an increased investment in the staff's learning. Sydney then visits her cousin Chantel (Danielle Deadwyler) to get her hair done. When Chantel leaves for errands, Sydney bonds with Chantel's 11-year-old daughter T.J. (Arion King), taking her shopping for groceries, cooking her a meal, and talking through her ongoing conflict with friends. Sydney uses the metaphor of sleepovers to discuss her indecision between staying at the Bear and moving to Shapiro's restaurant. Afterwards, Sydney calls Shapiro to discuss going over paperwork for their partnership.

== Production ==
=== Development and writing ===
"Worms" was the first writing credit on The Bear for both Edebiri and Boyce, regular castmembers since the pilot. Edebiri is the only main castmember to appear in "Worms." Edebiri, Boyce, and director Bravo are Black. Per Edebiri, "It's not doing something just to do it, or like, Now we have to have a Black episode...These people are Black, so let's make it as true and real and grounded as everything else is in the show." Edebiri and Boyce also sought insights for the script from fellow castmember Corey Hendrix, the Chicago native who plays Sweeps, inquiring about the possible vibe and setting of Sydney Adamu's cousin's Chantel's house and nearby hair salon on the South Side of Chicago, including potential neighborhood settings: "...Bronzeville? Or do you think it's more Englewood or Chatham? We're talking about the looming gentrification, so we want it to be close to a shop that's nice and shiny—maybe that's East Garfield." In writing the teleplay, Edebiri also directly quoted something that Hendrix said to her during the filming of season one, turning it into a line for Chantel: "That's in the north, right? You know their beefs be different. Put some cheese on it!"

Boyce's aunt is a beautician, and he told Rolling Stone, "She's owned beauty shops since I was a kid. So I think that's just a person you understand is a pillar in the community. Barbershops, beauty salons, they're third spaces. You see different people you know at different points of your life in there. The power of a haircut makes you feel invincible. You go in feeling on the fritz, and then you come out, you're like, 'Yeah, I can do anything. I can tackle this world.'" The "Barbershop" episode of Atlanta, another FX Networks series, also influenced the creation and style of the episode. Sydney's hair is central to the episode and not by mistake, according to Edebiri: "I thought about how her hair is always the same, and how that's connected to her as a character. That's not a coincidence."

Culinary producer Courtney Storer told Variety that she talked to Edebiri and Boyce about hiring in the restaurant, stating, "I've run kitchens and had other chefs pull me into new operations with every opportunity that I could want...working in one operation and then having a chef come in and be like, 'Hey, we have HR, and we have a whole structure for vacations and training. And sometimes that stuff that's promised never happens. Everyone's trying to bargain and bring on talent, and when you're in that space as a chef, it can be really isolating."

=== Casting ===
Correctly casting the role of T.J. was considered critical to the success of the episode. Per Boyce, "As I watched it, I texted Ayo because I was so impressed with Arion. That was the thing, when we wrote it, Chris [Storer, creator and showrunner of The Bear] was like, 'Yeah, I love it, but you gotta find a great kid.' Jeanie Bacharach, who's the casting director, and everyone did such a good job at finding Arion. Because that relationship is a tentpole of this episode, and you'd see it unfold. Watching it, it felt lived-in, and it reminded me of my sister in ways." Arion King went through four rounds of auditions before she won the part.

=== Filming ===
The episode was shot in March 2025 over the course of about five days. Adam's restaurant space in Avondale was shot at the then-forthcoming Avondale location of local coffee roaster Milli by Metric. Milli by Metric is "the official behind-the-scenes coffee vendor for The Bear's cast and crew."

Location scout John Roxas found a house in Bronzeville to possibly serve as Chantel and Christian's house, which director Bravo said she "knew 'immediately' was the right place to film. 'Let's not create some sort of patchwork to tell the story...Let's really drive across the train tracks, so to speak."

The painting on the wall in Chantel's upstairs hallway is a print of the 2022 painting A Flower Undimmed by Chicago painter Troy Lee. He told an interviewer in November 2025, "My friend Bianca Pastel recommended me. Someone from The Bear came and saw my work, and they reached out to me after."

=== Cinematography ===
According to Andrew Wehde, this episode was filmed in a more of rose-pink color palette than is found in the typical Bear episode. He told British Cinematographer magazine, "It has a whole different colour scheme to it. She takes us to a new part of Chicago we haven't really seen yet and because of that it's important to embrace the way light works, the way the buildings reflect light, the colours inside of it."

== Reception ==
=== Critical reviews ===
Rolling Stone critic Alan Sepinwall commended Deadwyler, "one of most chameleonic actors we have," for disappearing into this "relaxed, confident, funny role." He praised the episode overall as one of the season four installments that "zeroes in on the emotional details that matter."

Rolling Stone reporter C.T. Jones wrote that "the genius of 'Worms' also lies in how deftly Boyce and Edebiri lay out some of the most treasured and joyous parts of Black community onscreen without explaining them to death. The Bear is a show about all of the different ways a group of strangers can become family. 'Worms' turns that same silliness, banter, and heartwarming energy radical, by placing the Black home in a place of soft reverence." Slate's Nadira Goff found "Worms" to be a "lovely episode. It's both a testament to Black culture and an overdue check-in with Sydney, who has been ruminating on this choice between the chaos of her chosen family and the normalcy of strangers for ages," but felt that the story told therein frustratingly "doesn't end up mattering in her final decision between the two offers." Time's Judy Berman described the episode as "...refreshing, thanks in part to Bravo's lighter hand and in part to the respite it offers from Carmy's wallowing.

Vulture's Marah Eakin rated "Worms" four out of five stars, commenting, "It's always nice to get a Sydney-focused episode of The Bear, and this one is a doozy." Vulture culture correspondent Roxana Hadidi wrote that it "endures as a genuine, distinct portrait of Black womanhood created by a team making for themselves what they want to see onscreen." WaPo's Heil found that "the bits where Sydney is helping the girl decide whether to go to a slumber party and winds up turning her decision to stay at the Bear or take the offer to help open a new restaurant into a metaphor about which slumber party she wants to attend was funny and sweet. When she described Carmy as the 'big brother' at one of the houses who is the best video game player in the world, it was such a clear breakdown of their dynamic." Decider declared that "Worms" immediately "joins The Bear's hall of fame," commending the episode's illustration of Syd's thought process about her competing partnership offers.

BuzzFeed reacted to the "more serene episode" with a "*chef's kiss*," calling it "a beautiful look at Black culture and family" and commending it as "by far...the most Black coded episode in the entire series," turning the Chicago-centric eye of The Bear to focus on the city's large Black population for the first time. BuzzFeed staffer Jahmal wrote, "From their lingo to their body language, it's just such a fresh, funny, and vivid window into the culture. The way they gossip, the way they throw shots at each other and allude to family beef...it feels so authentic, like I'm sitting in my auntie's house while watching it." Substream magazine's Murjani Rawls wrote that the episode "delightfully centers Sydney's character" in partnership with T.J. as a Greek chorus of sorts: "Contrary to some beliefs, kids are intelligent. You can gain a lot of wisdom just by hearing their nuggets about life. They aren't as tainted by the world as adults are. 'Worms' has a great parallel in cojoining the problems of T.J., who is facing the prospect of switching schools, and her friends not directly inviting her to the slumber party, with Syd's own 'parties' she has to choose from."

Shapiro's treatment of Sydney within the episode was commented upon as an example of the way Black women are negatively treated in the work environment. Hello Beautiful's Boone found that Shapiro demonstrated a strictly "performative allyship," and that "Janicza Bravo directed the story with care, zooming in on the little moments that cause friction in the professional lives of Black women. The Italian family running The Bear may not be experts on intersectionality, but they are consistent. They expose everyone to the same 'energetically musty' environment. Shapiro pretended to value Sydney more than he did." Vulture's Eakin landed in the same place on the Shapiro issue, writing that "it's performative at best and patronizing at worst, and you have to think that working around someone like that...could suck the life out of someone like Syd."

The New Republic called the episode a "series highlight. Deadwyler is extraordinary, Edebiri is as funny as she's been on this show, and the episode is helmed by guest director Janicza Bravo with a kind of economical cool that feels refreshing amid the nosy extreme close-ups that characterize Storer's house style as a director."

=== Accolades ===
Award	Category	Recipient(s)	Result	Ref.
Black Reel TV Awards	Outstanding Directing in a Comedy Series	Ayo Edebiri	Nominated	
Black Reel TV Awards	Outstanding Writing in a Comedy Series	Ayo Edebiri and Lionel Boyce	Nominated	
Black Reel TV Awards	Black Reel Award for Outstanding Guest Performance in a Comedy Series	Danielle Deadwyler	Won	
Directors Guild of America Awards	Outstanding Directorial Achievement in Comedy Series	Janicza Bravo	Nominated	
Gracie Awards	Best Director – Comedy	Janicza Bravo	Won	
Writers Guild of America Awards	Episodic Comedy	Ayo Edebiri and Lionel Boyce	Nominated	

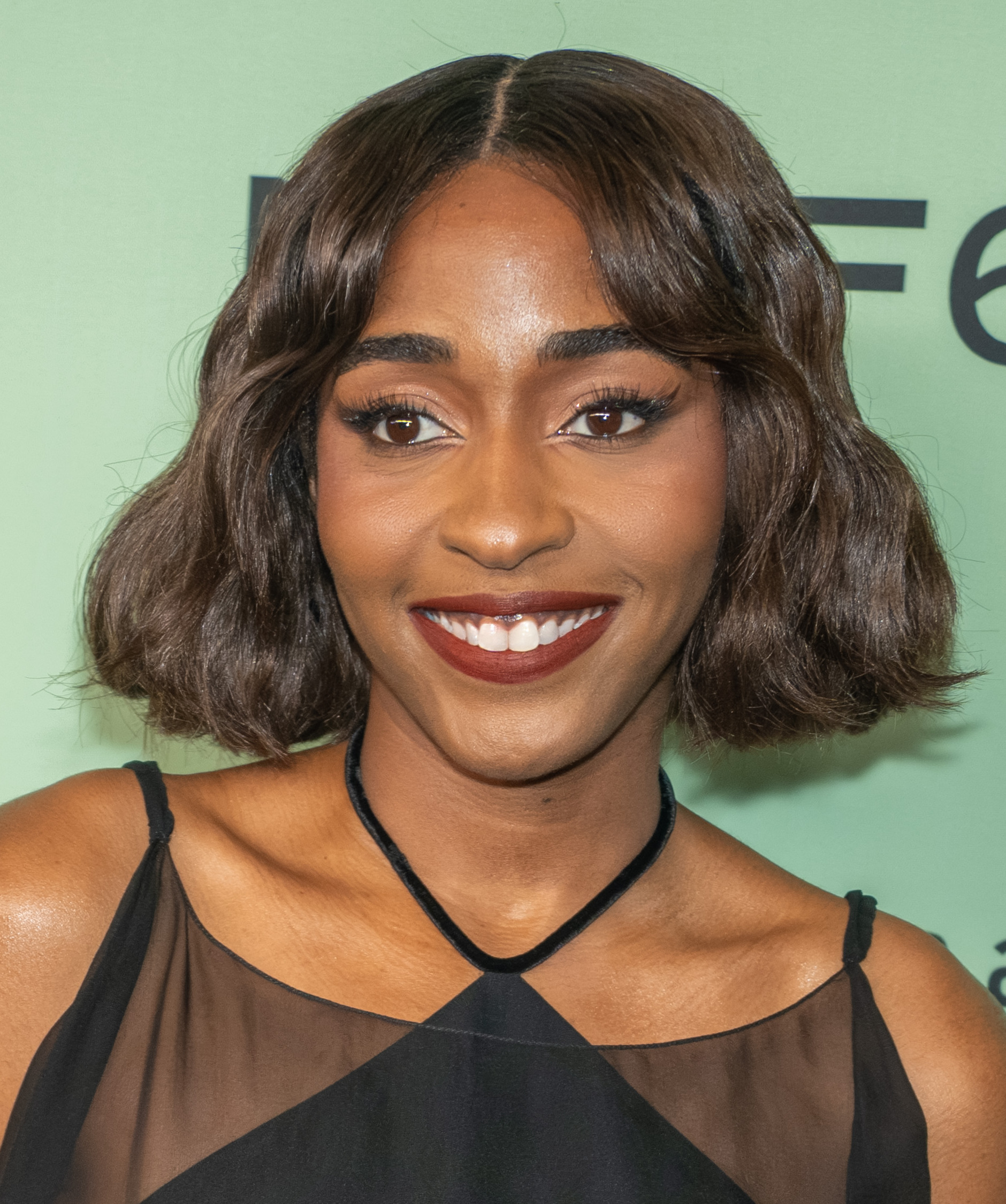
Ayo Edebiri (pictured) co-wrote the episode and stars as Sydney Adamu

The Hollywood Reporter named "Worms" in its year-end top-10 list as one of the best episodes of American television produced in 2025. Critic Daniel Fienberg wrote that the "sensitively written [...] attentively directed" installment, co-starring the "excellent" Deadwyler and "terrific King," revealed a "side of Syd that the show has never been able to present before, and leads to an episode of beautiful details and funny, touching moments free of the bombast that typically emerges from family gatherings on The Bear." At year's end, TheWrap named Edebiri's work in season four one of the 10 best TV performances of 2025, writing that the "episode was undeniable. [Edebiri] has been consistently great on the show for years now [...] but was truly at the top of her game (and handling multiple jobs) this season." The A.V. Club included it on their list of 16 best television episodes of 2025.

For the episode, Bravo was nominated for a Directors Guild of America Award, and Edebiri and Boyce were nominated for a Writers Guild of America Award. Furthermore, Bravo won a Gracie Award from the Alliance for Women in Media Foundation for Best Director – Comedy for the episode.
