= Tonnato (The Bear) =

- The Bear episode
- Episode no.: Season 4 Episode 9
- Directed by: Christopher Storer
- Written by: Joanna Calo & Christopher Storer
- Cinematography by: Andrew Wehde
- Editing by: Megan Mancini
- Production code: XCBV4009
- Original air date: June 25, 2025
- Running time: 39 minutes

Guest appearances
- Oliver Platt as Jimmy Kalinowski; Jamie Lee Curtis as Donna Berzatto; Rob Reiner as Albert Schnur; Chris Witaske as Pete Katinsky; Will Poulter as Luca; Ricky Staffieri as Ted Fak; Corey Hendrix as Gary "Sweeps" Woods; Sarah Ramos as Jess; Carmen Christopher as Chester; Andrew Lopez as Garrett; Brian Koppelman as the Computer; Richard Esteras as Manny; Jose Cervantes as Angel; Christopher J. Zucchero as Chi-Chi; Paulie James as Chuckie

Episode chronology
← Previous "Green"	Next → "Goodbye"
- The Bear season 4

"Tonnato" is the ninth episode of the fourth season of the American comedy-drama television series The Bear. It is the 37th overall episode of the series and was written by Joanna Calo & Christopher Storer and directed by Christopher Storer. It was released on Hulu on June 25, 2025, along with the rest of the season.

The series follows Carmen "Carmy" Berzatto (Jeremy Allen White), an award-winning New York City chef de cuisine, who returns to his hometown of Chicago to run his late brother Michael's failing Italian beef sandwich shop. With the financial backing of his uncle Jimmy (Oliver Platt) and help from his cousin Richie (Ebon Moss-Bachrach), sister Sugar (Abby Elliott), and chef Sydney (Ayo Edebiri), Carmy attempts to remodel the dingy Beef into warm and hospitable fine-dining destination called the Bear.

The episode garnered critical acclaim for the acting work of Jamie Lee Curtis as Donna Berzatto, and White as Carmy, whose performance during an attempted rapprochement between the recovering-alcoholic mother and her long-estranged son was described as "jaw-dropping" and "stunningly vulnerable."

== Plot ==
Carmy delivers the box of photos to his mother (Jamie Lee Curtis), and spends time with her at her insistence. Donna tearfully apologizes for the way she treated her family, and takes responsibility for being cruel to her children, lying, yelling, and drinking. She confesses that she did not know how to help Michael (Jon Bernthal). She tells Carmy she has been sober for nearly a year. She hears about his accomplishments and is proud of him, and she asks if she can be a part of his life again. Carmy looks around his childhood home, visiting the dining room and looking at the empty chair at the head of the table. Carmy makes the roast chicken he learned at the French Laundry for Donna. While it's in the oven, he takes the photo box upstairs and stows it in a closet and then is drawn to a closed door. He enters the bedroom and looks around, a little disoriented at first, and then smiles fondly at a bedside copy of No Reservations by Anthony Bourdain. He finds Claire's (Molly Gordon) green sweatshirt on a shelf in the closet.

Sydney and Uncle Jimmy (Oliver Platt) have a heart-to-heart talk behind the restaurant; Jimmy apologizes for his fuckhead nephew and tells Sydney she's a hardworking professional and it's been a pleasure to watch her come into her own as a chef at the restaurant. Sydney calls Jimmy "Unc" for the first time.

Ebraheim (Edwin Lee Gibson) tentatively agrees to partner with Albert Schnur (Rob Reiner) in expanding the Beef-window business. Albert meets Computer (Brian Koppelman), who agrees that expansion is a good idea. Luca (Will Poulter) casually asks Tina (Liza Colón-Zayas) to make a "test" version of the pasta dish, which she unwittingly completes in just under three minutes. Chester (Carmen Christopher) comes to the restaurant with paperwork for Marcus to sign regarding the sale of his mom's house and acts jealous about Marcus working closely with tall, handsome Luca.

Carmy returns to the restaurant and tells Richie that he visited his mother. Richie initially thinks Carmy is messing with him but then admits "that's nice" and then retreats to another part of the restaurant. Carmy calls Jimmy from inside the fridge, and leaves a voicemail message that says "I think I messed this place up," apologizes, and expresses gratitude for his kindness to their family over many years. Carmy returns to the kitchen for pre-service and listens closely as Sydney chatters happily about Sweeps' (Corey Hendrix) success as their sommelier.

After receiving a call from Food & Wine, Natalie announces that the magazine has named Marcus in their class of Best New Chefs. Marcus texts his dad with the good news. Richie seeks reassurance about the future of the restaurant from Garrett (Andrew Lopez), who encourages him and reminds him "every night's the Super Bowl." Pete (Chris Witaske) calls Sydney to tell her that Carmy has written himself out of the updated partnership agreement, leaving the restaurant's ownership to her, Natalie, and Jimmy.

== Production ==
=== Writing ===
Joanna Calo and Christopher Storer wrote the teleplay for "Tonnato."

=== Filming ===
According to actress Curtis, "We shot seasons three and four simultaneously. So the truth is, I did the scene with Sugar in the hospital, which was an entire episode. And two days later, I did my part at the wedding. And then the next day, my scene with Jeremy at the house. So it was a lot of Donna, which was not dissimilar to the Christmas episode where I came in for like a three-day bombardment and then was gone." Curtis told Time magazine, "We both knew what we're doing. The script is beautiful. I learned that having a kid who you don't know how to help is one of the most powerless experiences as a parent...the powerlessness you feel when you can't actually help them—you can find people who can help them, but you can't. So the part of that scene that gets me every time is when she talks about Mike (Jon Bernthal). Because clearly Mike had that problem since he was a little boy." About working with White, Curtis said, "He's just a beautiful performer. We use the term scene partner a lot in actor talk, but he's a scene partner. We don't rehearse it. We don't talk about it. We stay away from each other until it begins, and then it begins. And he has beautiful eyes, and they are expressive and soulful and sorrowful and very alive at times and very emotional at times. And I think you see all of that in this whole season, but in that scene in particular."

=== Music ===
The songs used in this episode are all reprises from previous episodes: "Save It for Later," recorded by Eddie Vedder specifically for The Bear (previously featured over the opening credits of the main action of season three); "The Show Goes On" by Bruce Hornsby & The Range (previously featured in the opening minutes of season 2, as Sydney and Carmy watched the old Beef sign come off the restaurant); and "New Noise" by Refused.

== Reception ==
=== Critical reviews ===
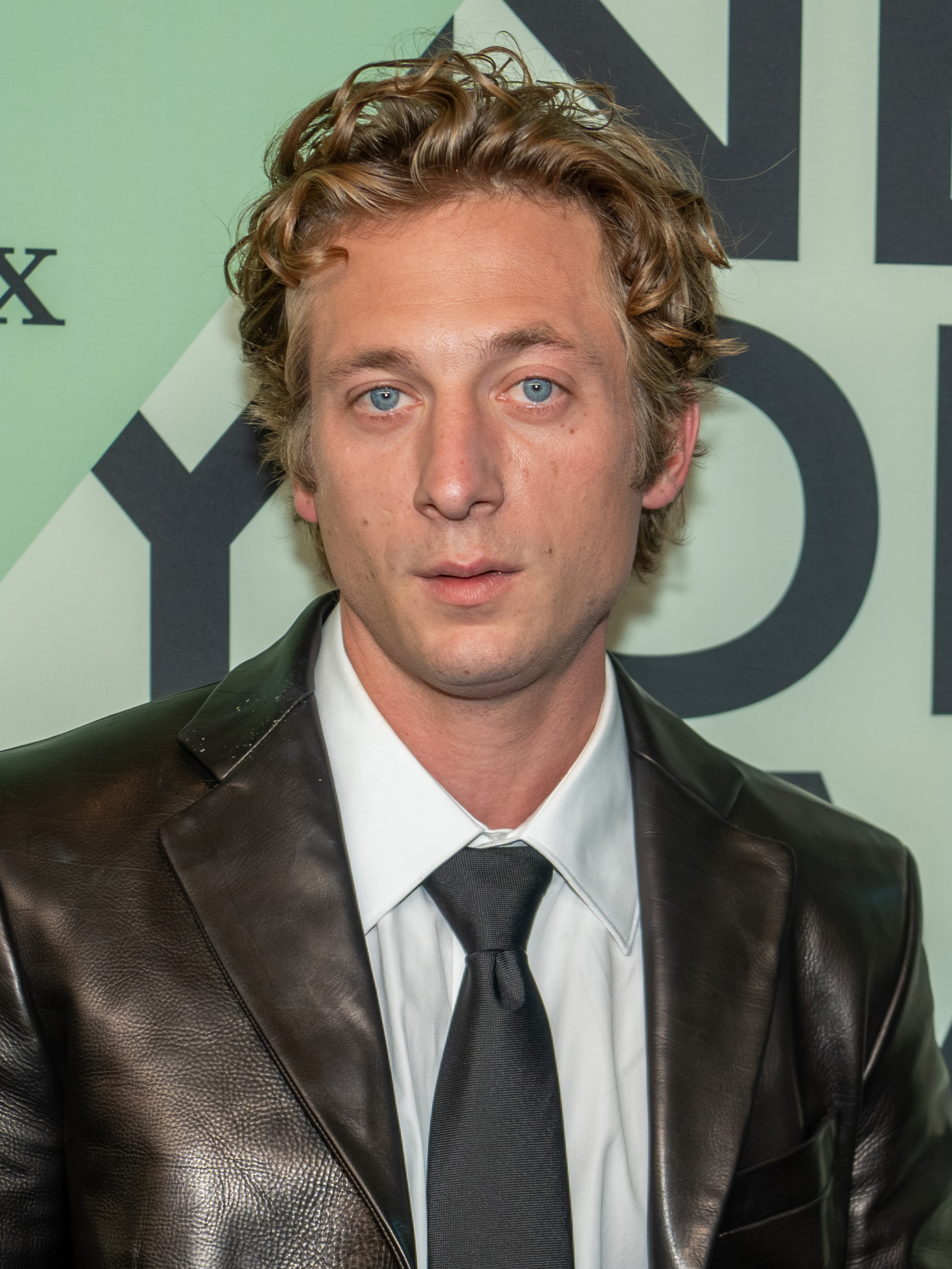
Jeremy Allen White's performance in the episode was praised by critics

Rolling Stone TV critic Alan Sepinwall commended Donna and Carmy's kitchen-table reunion for its "jaw-dropping performances from both Jamie Lee Curtis and Jeremy Allen White. At times during the conversation, Carmy looks like a cornered animal who would rather be anywhere else on the planet than listening to his mother talk about all the ways she hurt and failed him. At others, he looks like these are the words he's been waiting his whole life to hear."

Collider called it "one of the best episodes of the season, all thanks to the emotionally-charged performances by White and Curtis." Another Collider writer declared that this episode certified Curtis as "the show's greatest guest star of all time" with a "beautiful and moving arc, and easily the role of a lifetime for Curtis."

The A.V. Club's Jenna Scherer awarded the episode an A−, stating that the key Donna–Carmy scene demonstrated as much as anything all the ways that Carmy has himself matured since returning to Chicago, and yet "Anyone who grew up with an emotionally unstable parent knows that letting yourself believe they can change is the most terrifying of propositions ... After spending four seasons inside Carmy's head, we know that his offer to make Donna lunch is a huge deal for him. When was the last time he cooked a meal that was about expressing his love for another person rather than trying to prove something to himself? ... Carm whips up a plate for his mom but not for himself. Despite how far he's come, our boy still hasn't figured out that he deserves care and feeding just as much as anyone else."

Vulture awarded the episode four out of five stars, with Marah Eakin commenting, "...it's pretty sweet that the Food & Wine nod went to Marcus, right? He's had an awful year and the work he's done has seemed visionary. We've heard an awful lot about Syd's scallop dish this season, but everything that Marcus put out has felt beyond creative. Not bad for a kid who started at McDonald's." The Decider recapper came into the episode with low expectations but found warm spots such as when "Cicero tells [Sydney] how much of a pleasure it's been to watch her growth and apologizes again for his 'fuckhead nephew' ... Then they hug it out," while being alienated by Chester's (Carmen Christopher) energy in "disturbing and demeaning moments" where he "becomes a bumbling, awkward, sweaty mess" over Luca (Will Poulter) and Marcus' friendship, "Okay, okay—take it easy, Chester. Christ."

The New York Times described the key scene between White and Curtis as "... riveting ... rooted in what The Bear does well, dramatizing how difficult and messy it can be when people try to put their most complicated feelings into words. The conversation doesn't end with everything hunky dory, nor does it end with Carmy storming out and saying, 'Too little, too late.' Instead he thanks Donna, [and cooks for her] ... It's progress.

Tara Ariano of Cracked wrote that "Even if [Rob Reiner's] Albert had been a total dud in all his other scenes—and he's not—it would still be worth creating the character for the moment he meets Computer in the season's penultimate episode."

=== Accolades ===
Award	Category	Nominee	Result	Ref.
Primetime Creative Arts Emmy Awards	Outstanding Guest Actor in a Comedy Series	Rob Reiner (Note: Posthumous)	Won	
Primetime Creative Arts Emmy Awards	Outstanding Guest Actress in a Comedy Series	Jamie Lee Curtis	Nominated	
