= Bears (The Bear) =

- The Bear episode
- Episode no.: Season 4 Episode 7
- Directed by: Christopher Storer
- Written by: Joanna Calo
- Cinematography by: Andrew Wehde
- Editing by: Joanna Naugle
- Production code: XCBV4007
- Original air date: June 25, 2025
- Running time: 70 minutes

Guest appearances
- Oliver Platt as Jimmy Kalinowski; Jamie Lee Curtis as Donna Berzatto; Molly Gordon as Claire Dunlap; Josh Hartnett as Frank; Gillian Jacobs as Tiffany Jerimovich; Brie Larson as Francie Fak; John Mulaney as Stevie; Bob Odenkirk as Lee Lane; Sarah Paulson as Michelle Berzatto; Chris Witaske as Pete Katinsky; Ricky Staffieri as Ted Fak; Carmen Christopher as Chester; Mitra Jouhari as Kelly; Annabelle Toomey as Evie Jerimovich; James Swanberg as Kyle

Episode chronology
← Previous "Sophie"	Next → "Green"
- The Bear season 4

"Bears" is the seventh episode of the fourth season of the American comedy-drama television series The Bear. It is the 37th overall episode of the series and was written by Joanna Calo and directed by series creator Christopher Storer. It was released on Hulu on June 25, 2025, along with the rest of the season.

The series follows Carmen "Carmy" Berzatto (Jeremy Allen White), an award-winning New York City chef de cuisine, who returns to his hometown of Chicago to run his late brother Michael's failing Italian beef sandwich shop. With the financial backing of his uncle Jimmy (Oliver Platt) and help from his cousin Richie (Ebon Moss-Bachrach), sister Sugar (Abby Elliott), and chef Sydney (Ayo Edebiri), Carmy attempts to remodel the dingy Beef into warm and hospitable fine-dining destination called the Bear.

This episode is set at the wedding of Richie's ex-wife Tiff (Gillian Jacobs) to Frank (Josh Hartnett). Brie Larson guest-stars as Francie Fak, and Bob Odenkirk returns as Uncle Lee for a solitary scene, resulting in what was described as a gorgeous acting "duet" opposite White.

== Plot ==
Sydney helps Richie calm down before entering. Natalie and Francie (Brie Larson) see each other for the first time in years and start arguing. Cousin Michelle (Sarah Paulson) briefly and awkwardly encounters Donna (Jamie Lee Curtis), before going upstairs to spend some quality time with bride Tiffany, who is sad yet relieved that her mother is not present. Stevie (John Mulaney) and Claire comfort Frank about how many Berzattos are in attendance and reassure him things will be fine even though they suspect it will be a lovable disaster. It is revealed that Natalie and Francie used to be best friends and hooked up at some point. Carmy, already anxious, panics upon seeing Donna for the first time in years. Richie and Syd rescue him by saying he is needed in the kitchen, where he finds a moment to himself but runs into Lee (Bob Odenkirk). Lee says that he and Mikey became friends before the latter's death, that Mikey was proud of Carmy, that Lee saw Carmy at Mikey's funeral though no one else knew he attended, and that Donna (Jamie Lee Curtis) is learning to express emotional pain instead of letting it build up. Sydney sits with Donna, who is not drinking, and speaks positively about working with Carmy. Donna calmly leaves with Lee soon after. Syd debriefs Carmy on her talk with Donna. Frank begs Richie's help in consoling his daughter Evie (Annabelle Toomey), who is hiding under a table to avoid performing a planned dance with Frank. Richie, Frank, and Claire (Molly Gordon) get under the table to talk to her, and are gradually joined by most of the Berzattos, Tiff, the Faks, Kelly (Mitra Jouhari), Marcus (Lionel Boyce), and Chester (Carmen Christopher). The group takes turns opening up about their fears to reassure Evie. Afterwards, Richie tells Uncle Jimmy (Oliver Platt) the story about the Kyoto rock garden from season three, but with a new insight: that Richie is not a rock all alone, but the sand, connecting all these people. Natalie and Francie reconcile. Claire and Carmy reconnect and dance. Ted tells Kelly that he loves her. Evie agrees to dance with her new stepfather Frank. Tiff confides to Uncle Jimmy that she was worried she would lose the Berzatto extended family when she and Richie divorced, but he reassures her that she will always be a Bear no matter what. The episode ends with Tiff and Richie dancing together, Tiff overcome with emotion, and Richie smiling down at her and embracing her. Richie returns home, alone but overjoyed, as he receives the photo of everyone together under the table.

== Production ==
=== Writing ===
Joanna Calo wrote the teleplay for "Bears."

=== Casting ===
Series creator Chris Storer and actor Brie Larson first met approximately 15 years ago, and renewed their acquaintance at awards shows where both The Bear and Larson's Lessons in Chemistry were nominated. According to Vanity Fair, Storer offered Larson the part of Francine Fak in "early 2024." Larson said, "I created this backstory that she was a micro-influencer, because I was constantly caring about my appearance and taking selfies. I see a version [of the show] where that part comes into play and is helpful in the future for the restaurant."

=== Costuming ===
Costume designer Courtney Wheeler's favourite wedding looks were from Nat and Francie because "we thought it would be so funny if they wore these sweeter silhouettes, because they are absolutely trash-talking the shit out of each other." Wheeler told Harper's Bazaar, "Before filming, we sat down and asked ourselves, what is the most Midwestern thing we can do for these girls? We eventually ended up with this perfect Hill House Home–type look—this very cottagecore, very feminine, springtime, romantic look. Francie wore a dress from Selkie, and Sugar's was from Ganni. We thought, wouldn't it be funny if both Francie and Sugar had these dreamy picnic dresses and they were just completely sailor-mouthing, so upset at each other and just yelling? They look so 'I'm just a girl', while their mouths are just like 'Do you know what you did?'"

=== Sound recording ===
Due to a combination of the scene blocking and the costuming of the cast, the audio team could not use lavaliere microphones or boom microphones to record sound for the under-the-table scene. A total of 32 microphones, including 16 wired into holes drilled in the table, along with two sound mixers, were necessary to create the soundscape and capture all the dialogue for the "under the table" shots. Sound producer Scott D. Smith reported that dialogue editor Evan Benjamin "was rather astonished when he received thirty-two channels [of recorded sound], which was well in excess of even the most complicated scenes we had done to date."

=== Filming ===
"Bears" was shot in 2024. According to Larson, "The scene with my two brothers where they're saying that I'm never nice to their girlfriends—that was just one take, completely improvised."

=== Editing ===
Joanna Naugle told The Ankler that "Bears" is in many ways a mirror image of "Fishes." The under-the-table scene contrasts with the mayhem at the Berzatto Christmas table, which Naugle tried to emphasize with extensive use of reaction shots: "There's a lot more listening and understanding in those reaction shots in 'Bears' compared to 'Fishes'...In the wedding episode, it's like, 'Oh, people are really empathizing with each other and seeing a different side of each other.'"

=== Music ===
The songs used in this episode are "Walls (Circus)" by Tom Petty & The Heartbreakers, "Susanne" by Weezer, "Tenderness" by General Public (or Oberhofer?),"Nothing But Love" by James, "Still The Night" by BoDeans, "Style" by Taylor Swift, "Sad Song" by Lou Reed, "Apron Strings" by Everything But the Girl, "My Lonely Sad Eyes" by Them, "Why Not Me" by The Judds, "A Beginning Song" by The Decemberists, "Shelter" by Maria McKee, "(Today I Met) The Boy I'm Gonna Marry" by Darlene Love, "Throw Your Arms Around Me" by Pearl Jam, and "Tougher Than the Rest" by Emmylou Harris.

== Reception ==
=== Critical reviews ===
Alan Sepinwall of Rolling Stone commended the actors who play the Berzatto siblings for pulling off big moments of very different tones. On the exaggerated comedy of Nat versus Francie: "Credit obviously to Brie Larson for absolutely going for it with this performance, when her comedic chops have been called upon less and less the bigger her career has become, and for also trying to fit into the show in a way that John Cena—as another Fak—didn't bother to last season. But the subplot's also a potent reminder that Abby Elliott was once an SNL castmember and [is] a gifted comic actress." On the drama side of the fence, Sepinwall wrote, "[Bob] Odenkirk and Jeremy Allen White stage a spectacular little duet as Lee opens up to Carmy about all he's been through since they last saw each other. It's hard to choose which is the more powerful moment: the slight break in Lee's voice when he tells Carmy, 'Sometimes, to break patterns, you gotta...break patterns, man,' or the look of astonished hope on Carmy's face when he realizes Lee is telling the truth about Mikey being proud of his little brother."

The A.V. Club gave "Bears" an A− grade, with Jenna Scherer commenting, "It's a classic entry into the wedding-episode canon, complete with reunited exes, estranged relatives, and dishy revelations. It also represents a pivotal moment for our big three characters: Carmy exorcising his demons, Sydney's priorities coming into focus, and Richie realizing he's not as alone as he thinks."

Vulture's Marah Eakin rated it five out of five stars, writing, "I think the resolution I liked the most in this episode happens around Richie, who went into the wedding after essentially having a panic attack in the alley, chain-smoking while peppering Sydney with Philip K. Dick quotes. Inside, though, he ends up bro-ing down with Frank, who it turns out is also desperately jealous of Richie's relationship with his daughter and deeply afraid that he's going to be a shitty stepdad to Eva. Richie is pretty generous to calm him down and teach him about parenting game face when he could have leaned into his selfish desire for his daughter's love, and it's clearer than ever that Richie has become a much better person than he was when The Bear started." A. J. Daulerio of Decider rejected the episode as an improbable stack of contrivances and, more broadly, felt that it betrayed the initial premise of the series. The New Republic was similarly critical, arguing that "the big Berzatto episode doesn't earn its run time—an hour and nine minutes!"

=== Accolades ===
Award	Category	Nominee	Result	Ref.
ACE Eddie Awards	Best Edited Single-Camera Comedy Series	Joanna Naugle	Nominated	
Art Directors Guild Awards	Half-Hour Single-Camera Series	Merje Veski	Nominated	
Directors Guild of America Awards	Outstanding Directorial Achievement in Comedy Series	Christopher Storer	Nominated	
Primetime Emmy Awards	Outstanding Directing for a Comedy Series	Christopher Storer	Pending	
Primetime Creative Arts Emmy Awards	Outstanding Picture Editing for a Single-Camera Comedy Series	Joanna Naugle	Nominated	

== Sources ==
- Smith, Scott D. (Fall 2025). "The Bear: The Challenges of Managing Kitchen Chaos". Production Sound & Video. 17 (4). North Hollywood, California: IATSE 695: 32–37.
