= Andrea Terry =

Fictional character, The Bear TV series

- The Bear character
- Olivia Colman as Terry
- First appearance: "Forks"
- Last appearance: "Forever"
- Created by: Christopher Storer; Courtney Storer
- Portrayed by: Olivia Colman

In-universe information
- Occupation: Chef

Chef Andrea Terry is a recurring character on the FX Network television series The Bear. Played by Olivia Colman, Terry is an acclaimed chef whose Chicago restaurant, Ever, was a legendary three-Michelin-starred destination for a dozen years. Over the course of her career, she employed and trained many notable chefs, including Carmy Berzatto (Jeremy Allen White), Luca (Will Poulter), and Adam Shapiro (Adam Shapiro). Colman was nominated for two Primetime Emmy Awards for Outstanding Guest Actress in a Comedy Series for her performances in "Forks" and "Forever".

== Development and characterization ==
While developing the story for "Forks," The Bear culinary producer Courtney Storer suggested to series creator Christopher Storer (her brother) that the head chef at the show's version of Ever be a woman, and he agreed. The character of Andrea Terry was inspired in part by the biographies of Alice Waters and Marcella Hazan. Nancy Silverton is another real-world chef who inspired the styling of Chef Terry.

The character name was originally "Chef Tally," but per Ebon Moss-Bachrach, "that name couldn't get cleared."

Chef Terry is depicted as "calm, caring, soft spoken, and focused." As depicted in multiple episodes of season 3, especially the premiere episode "Tomorrow," Terry's "dulcet voice commands her team, demanding perfection without the abuse and trauma. She sees Carmy's potential and chooses to nurture it, not through mind games and negativity, but by building his confidence and guiding him in the right direction." According to culinary producer Courtney Storer, the dish with the peas that Carmy revises at The Bear in "Tomorrow" is meant to reference his relationship with Terry.

== Biography ==
Terry's father was in the military and she apparently adapted to his desire for order, such that she "runs her kitchen with the silent precision of a fine Swiss watch." Terry is depicted as having trained, employed, mentored, collaborated with or befriended many star chefs, including real-world chefs and restaurateurs such as Grant Achatz, Dave Beran, Kevin Boehm, Wylie Dufresne, Will Guidara and Christina Tosi. She is also somehow familiar with the chilling Chef David Fields (Joel McHale), who haunted the New York restaurant Empire and then Carmy's nightmares. Her legendary restaurant, a fictionalized version of Chicago's real-world Ever, is maybe "the best restaurant in the world." Similarly, Terry's chef de cuisine Adam Shapiro, who eventually seeks to poach chef Sydney Adamu (Ayo Edebiri) from the Bear to be his chef de cuisine at an unnamed restaurant in the Avondale neighborhood of Chicago, at one point "erupts into a torrent of verbal abuse aimed at Garrett (Andrew Lopez), who must bear the responsibility for one of his staff having smudged food on a plate. Chef Adam's behavior is excessive and vicious. And in light of what has come immediately before, the outburst raises the question of whether [Terry's supposed] values...are merely masks for disvalue."

Terry is initially only suggested as a presence at the beginning of "Forks," an apparently untouchable, unknowable goddess of an elite chef, whom only designated demigods may approach. When Richie (Ebon Moss-Bachrach), who was sent to Ever by Carmy to stage with the front of house staff, finally encounters her, she is doing the simple, hands-on prep work of peeling crimini mushrooms, thus modeling that care for one's duties is honorable thing, and impressing upon Richie a resonant and enduring lesson about "the significance of others, and how worthy they are to be known, served and valued."

Terry appears in flashbacks in "Tomorrow," head chef directing subordinates Carmy, Luca, and Adam Shapiro. (Dave Beran also appears as one of Terry's cooks; Beran is the one who coaxed Grant Achatz to cameo in "Forever.") One of the dishes being assembled in Chef Terry's kitchen is a variation of the real-world Ever's tasting-menu dish "carrot terrine with black olive powder, pistachio purée, and yuzu."

After more than a decade at the peak of Chicago cuisine, Chef Terry decides to retire to visit London more often and spend more time enjoying the quality of life she has worked so hard to serve others through her food. Terry's final appearance, "Forever", depicts a celebratory "funeral" for Ever. In her eulogy for the business, she declares that one of the main lessons she learned over her career was that the relationships she established with people she served and worked with were more important and memorable than any plated dish could ever be, and indeed, the connection contributes to the experience of dining. As one of Ever's alumni chefs, Carmy attends the funeral, with Sydney as his plus one, and Richie spends the evening in the kitchen with expert service expediter Jessica (Sarah Ramos).

After dinner, Terry finds Carmen outside the restaurant. They talk about her legacy and career, as well as what Carmy learned from her. She ends the evening at a raucous afterparty at Syd's tiny apartment, spooning caviar onto baked Eggo waffles, drinking keg beer out of red Solo cups, and singing along to "Laid" by James.

== Styling ==
Chef Terry wears a men's model Rolex Submariner specially fitted to Olivia Colman's "so small" wrists. Terry having a Rolex was a creative choice inspired by Daniel Boulud's own GMT Master and Thomas Keller's own Daytona, both visible onscreen in "Tomorrow" and "Forever."

== Critical reception ==
Reaction to the character of Chef Terry has been broadly positive. A BuzzFeed writer commented in 2025, "Does Olivia Colman ever NOT deliver? Chef Terry was last seen at Syd's house party, after the Ever closer, taking shots and making some type of delicious-looking waffle dessert concoction."

== See also ==
- List of The Bear characters
- List of The Bear episodes
- Food of The Bear
- Music on The Bear
- Family on The Bear
