= Replicants (The Bear) =

- The Bear episode
- Episode no.: Season 4 Episode 5
- Directed by: Christopher Storer
- Written by: Karen Joseph Adcock
- Cinematography by: Andrew Wehde
- Editing by: Joanna Naugle; Adam Epstein
- Production code: XCBV4005
- Original air date: June 25, 2025
- Running time: 33 minutes

Guest appearances
- Robert Townsend as Emmanuel Adamu; Will Poulter as Luca; Rob Reiner as Albert Schnur; David Zayas as David; Ricky Staffieri as Ted Fak; Corey Hendrix as Gary "Sweeps" Woods; Sarah Ramos as Chef Jess; Carmen Christopher as Chester; Andrew Lopez as Garrett; Rene Gube as Rene; Kate Berlant as Georgie; Christopher Zucchero as Chi-Chi; Paulie James as Chuckie

Episode chronology
← Previous "Worms"	Next → "Sophie"
- The Bear season 4

"Replicants" is the fifth episode of the fourth season of the American comedy-drama television series The Bear. It is the 33rd overall episode of the series and was directed by series creator Christopher Storer. It was released on Hulu on June 25, 2025, along with the rest of the season.

The series follows Carmy Berzatto (Jeremy Allen White), an award-winning New York City chef de cuisine, who returns to his hometown of Chicago to run his late brother Michael's failing Italian beef sandwich shop. With the financial backing of his uncle Jimmy (Oliver Platt) and help from his cousin Richie (Ebon Moss-Bachrach), sister Sugar (Abby Elliott), and chef Sydney (Ayo Edebiri), Carmy attempts to remodel the dingy Beef into a warm and hospitable fine-dining destination called the Bear.

== Plot ==
Carmy attends an Al-Anon meeting and is moved by another member's vivid story of her brother's addiction. He later drives to Oak Park in the van and tours the Frank Lloyd Wright Home and Studio. Sydney receives an updated partnership agreement from Carmy. Marcus sells his late mother's house with his roommate Chester's help. Carmy hires Luca as a stage to help Marcus. Tina talks to Carmy about his current struggle with reducing ingredients and advises him to slow down the pace of the menu. Carmy reveals to Sydney that he has decided on a set menu, admitting that his insistence on changing the menu every day was selfish and detrimental to the restaurant. Natalie brings baby Sophie to the restaurant. Sydney receives a call from the hospital saying her father has suffered a heart attack.

== Production ==
=== Development ===
"Replicants" was written by Karen Joseph Adcock.

=== Filming ===
Children's playroom, Frank Lloyd Wright Home and Studio

Carmy toured Frank Lloyd Wright Home and Studio house museum in Oak Park, Illinois. The scenes were filmed over the course of one morning in early 2025. The historical site's digital communications manager, Christine Trevino, conducted the onscreen tour, pointing out and explaining key details of the building design and history to Jeremy Allen White and The Bear crew. The cast and crew were granted special permission to interact with objects and furniture that are usually off-limits to visitors and were permitted to film in the typically closed-off kitchen and balcony of the drafting room.

=== Music ===
The songs featured in the episode are "Let Me Live in Your City" by Paul Simon, "Slip Away (A Warning)" by Lou Reed and John Cale, "It's Magic" by Doris Day (the 1948 version not the 1952 version), "Hope the High Road" by Jason Isbell and the 400 Unit, "Looking Into You" by Jackson Browne, and "Pull the Cup" by Shellac.

== Reception ==
The Daily Beast called Berlant's four-minute monologue a "highlight of the season."

Richie's line "Who wants to melt some provolone on a fuckin' baby right now?" was deemed especially memorable by The A.V. Club. The pairing of Rob Reiner and Edwin Lee Gibson was called a "comedy dream team."

Vulture felt that the episode simultaneously highlighted that although Richie is hilarious he also nurses an ongoing bitterness: "...Richie doesn't know how to have an adult conversation with a male he's related(ish) to. He seems to only know how to throw syllabic grenades, dropping lines about Carmy's supposed fear of refrigerators..."
