= The Bear (The Bear episode) =

- The Bear episode
- Episode no.: Season 2 Episode 10
- Directed by: Christopher Storer
- Written by: Kelly Galuska
- Cinematography by: Andrew Wehde
- Editing by: Joanna Naugle
- Production code: XCVB2010
- Original release date: June 22, 2023
- Running time: 40 minutes

Guest appearances
- Oliver Platt as Jimmy "Cicero" Kalinowski; Jamie Lee Curtis as Donna Berzatto; Edwin Lee Gibson as Ebraheim; Molly Gordon as Claire; Robert Townsend as Emmanuel Adamu; Joel McHale as Chef David Fields; Chris Witaske as Pete; Corey Hendrix as Gary "Sweeps" Woods; Jose M. Cervantes as Angel; Richard Esteras as Manny; Alex Moffat as Josh; Carmen Christopher as Chester; Ricky Staffieri as Theodore Fak; Isa Arciniegas as Daniela; Jack Lancaster as Connor

Episode chronology
← Previous "Omelette"	Next → "Tomorrow"
- The Bear season 2

"The Bear" is the tenth and final episode of the second season and 18th overall of the American comedy-drama series The Bear. Alongside with the rest of the second season, it was released on June 22, 2023, on Hulu. It was directed by series creator Christopher Storer and written by Kelly Galuska.

== Plot ==
On family and friends night, Richie (Ebon Moss-Bachrach) runs the front of house while Sydney (Ayo Edebiri) runs the kitchen. Issues begin to mount: a line cook disappears, the restaurant runs out of forks, Marcus (Lionel Boyce) and Sydney run into communication issues due to her earlier rejection, the toilet once again breaks, and Carmy (Jeremy Allen White) disrupts service when he elects to serve Claire (Molly Gordon) one of the dishes himself only to nearly blow up upon his return to the kitchen when he decides some of the dishes were prepared wrong. The final straw comes when the walk-in refrigerator handle breaks, trapping Carmy inside. With tickets piling up and their head chef trapped, Richie steps in to take over expediting while Sydney jumps on the line. Despite some initial trepidation, Richie and Sydney work together to get the kitchen running smoothly.

While Natalie (Abby Elliott) helps out in the kitchen, Pete (Chris Witaske) sees Donna (Jamie Lee Curtis) outside and runs out to invite her in. She refuses, feeling she does not deserve to witness her children's success. Donna begs Pete not to tell her children she showed up to the restaurant. Pete accidentally reveals Natalie's pregnancy to Donna before she leaves. Shaken by the experience, he keeps Donna's secret while suggesting to Natalie she not hold it against her mother. Though the service finishes successfully, Carmy spirals from his lack of ability to oversee it, imagining the voice of his abusive former boss in New York criticizing him. Marcus finds the missing line cook, Josh, outside in the alley smoking meth, and obtains Sydney's permission to fire him. Richie has front of house serve Cicero a chocolate banana as a surprise, a gesture that moves Cicero (Oliver Platt). Tina tries to encourage Carmy through the refrigerator door by telling him how well everything has gone, but Carmy starts to rant about how he has failed the restaurant with his lack of focus. Claire comes into the kitchen after hearing he is stuck in the walk-in and overhears the end of his rant where he declares that his relationship with her was a waste of time, causing her to leave in tears. Richie sees her leave and angrily confronts Carmy through the door, leading to a heated argument when he impulsively insults Carmy by calling him "Donna".

Sydney has a panic attack after imagining the ticket printer continuing to spit out orders and runs out of the restaurant to vomit. Sydney's father (Robert Townsend) finds her in the alley and expresses his pride in her, emboldening her. Marcus receives a package from Luca (Will Poulter) as an opening-night present: a sign reading "Every Second Counts". As Marcus hangs the sign, he fails to notice several missed calls and frantic messages from his mother's nurse. Most of the staff celebrate the successful service, but Richie is left emotionally drained from his argument with Carmy. As he waits for the fridge to be cut open, Carmy plays a missed voicemail from Claire earlier in the day, in which she confesses her love for him, leaving him devastated.

== Production ==
=== Development ===
The episode was directed by series creator Christopher Storer and written by Kelly Galuska. It was Galuska's first writing credit, and Storer's twelfth directing credit.

=== Production design ===
According to production designer Merje Veski, the look of the newly unveiled Bear restaurant was influenced by the style of Napa Valley's French Laundry and Chicago's Ever. The restaurant kitchen is a fully functional working kitchen, not just a dead set. Similarly, the kitchen was designed with "practical lighting" so that "the lighting crew actually never had to light it....we worked with the lighting designer...very closely where to put exactly what lights and light temperature." The asymmetric globe-light chandelier in the dining room drew positive comment from professional interior designers because such light fixtures cast extensive, but relatively dim, light that minimizes shadows and glare on the tables generally, and the food in particular, inducing a feeling of secure intimacy.

A restaurant builder interviewed by The New York Times thought the Bear crew had hit on the right array of details to make the dining room appealing, including "the brick wall painted white...exposed ceiling joists, Scandinavian color scheme, clean lines and 'pops of nature' like the light wooden furniture," all of which served to focus the attention of guests and staff on "the service, the food, the delivery." The wood is painted plywood and maple, "modest" and affordable materials in line with the "Danish design" Syd pitched in "Braciole." According to Veski, the production team created the "linear window between the kitchen and the dining room, so you can see through and see the action. But at the same time, Chris [Storer] wanted to keep the kitchen action completely separate from the dining room, so the sounds wouldn't go through. It's not open concept, but you can still see the background." One restaurant designer, Jon de la Cruz, told Architectural Digest that the frosted glass for the exterior-facing front window "felt like a deliberate choice in a rougher area of the city. '[It's] creating a sense of mystery and exclusivity, teasing the energy inside without giving away any sense of the people or the food. It also completely hides the interior, telling us that the quality level inside is much higher than what is typical of the neighborhood."

Under the supervision of culinary producer Coco Storer, the simplified seven fishes dish was designed by Tim Flores and Genie Kwon of Chicago's Kasama, with a "beautiful fumé with saffron" to accompany prawns, calamari, mussels, scallops, little clams, and amberjack. The Carabinero prawns (Aristaeopsis edwardsiana) were chosen because they are "red and really vibrant and kind of looked like the lobster in Seven Fishes."

=== Set decoration ===
The Franklin dining-room chairs and the chairs at the bar were built by Chicago-based Navillus Woodworks. The plates and bowls selected for the new restaurant are earthenware made by American ceramacist Jono Pandolfi in "toasted clay." Pandolfi and hospitality-group owner and season three co-producer Will Guidara were in a band together in high school. In the 2000s, Pandolfi created the plates and bowls for Guidara's NoMad and Eleven Madison Park. Pandolfi aspires to create restaurant ceramics that "should not be striking. It should not grab your attention before the food." The restaurant's bucatini gricia is being prepared in an All-Clad D3 frying pan, used for rendering the fat of the diced guanciale. Marcus' Copenhagen sundae and the frozen grapes for the welcome broth are served in vintage bone china, specifically the Royal Albert American Beauty pattern.

=== Filming ===
The episode opens with a single continuous long take, a device also used in the season 1 episode "Review". Screen Rant described the 12-minute shot as "impressively choreographed," crediting it with achieving "the same dazzling effect" as "Review." Jeremy Allen White indicated that the filming of the episode mainly occurred in one sitting, with the exception of the dining scenes, typical of the production style that Storer liked to use while filming to create a hectic atmosphere familiar throughout the show. The episode makes frequent use of the split screen camera angle effect during the period where Carmy is locked in the broken walk-in refrigerator, a plot point that was frequently referenced throughout the second season.

Molly Gordon revealed that certain aspects of the script were changed during filming. The voicemail message that Carmy plays in the episode was not originally written but was later included on Gordon's suggestion. Storer decided that White, playing Carmy, would only hear the voicemail during the shooting of the scene while alone in the refrigerator.

The scene between Pete (Chris Witaske) and Donna (Jaime Lee Curtis) was filmed on one of The Bear soundstages, in about five takes.

Jeremy Allen White told Deadline Hollywood about Carmy's collapse: "I do think that that [signed] apology [to Sydney] is, of course, for his behavior in that moment that but I think that apology as well was for, you know, maybe he wasn't ready for this. Maybe he's incapable of this. Maybe he cannot lead you tonight. When he gets locked in the freezer, it's his show and it's a complete loss of control. Control is so important to Carmy and to lose control just in one fell swoop of that door closing is just agonizing—and then not being able to be there. And then, of course, I feel like Carmy's mother is kind of off limits in arguments and that's like an understanding that Richie and Carmy have. That's a place that you don't go. When Richie slips and calls Carmy 'Donna,' I think that's a real trigger and the beginning of the end." Moss-Bachrach found Richie's reversion to opponent appropriate to the irregular nature of character growth: "[I'm] glad that the portrayal of this character is not so basic and TV-like that he spends four and a half days at a Michelin-star restaurant and all of a sudden he gets like the Cinderella makeover and he's somebody else...I don't buy that shit."

=== Music ===
According to the show's composer Jeffrey Qaiyum, the score for the soft open "was the first piece I made. It's not even really music, it's more of a surging rumble. Like something from science fiction." Other soundtrack music includes "Velouria" by the Pixies, "Spiders (Kidsmoke)" by Wilco, "Animal" by Pearl Jam, "Hope We Can Again" by Nine Inch Nails, "Leaving Missouri" by Trent Reznor and Atticus Ross, and "Half a World Away" by R.E.M.

Highlighting the episode's use of "Half a World Away", co-executive producer Josh Senior thought early on that it would be the culminating music of the season. Storer felt that the song "speaks to waiting for some miracle to happen or some form of connection and feeling lost at the same time."

== Reception ==
=== Critical reviews ===
The season two finale was released to generally positive reviews and praised for its typical style of high pressure and intensity. Alan Sepinwall of Rolling Stone said, "The Bear...is already at a level of artistry few of its competitors can touch. It continues to make every second count." Marah Eakin of Vulture praised the show and its continuous intensity. Salon.com critic Melanie McFarland praised the episode, saying: "'The Bear' deserves all the hype poured over it for the usual reasons—its atmospheric directing, writing, awareness of place, and performances collaborate to grant its consumption a sense of urgency and necessity."

Josh Rosenberg of Esquire praised the show while contrasting it with the first season, noting that this season showed more background and displayed more emotion from the characters. James Poniewozik of The New York Times also praised it while noting differences between the first and second season: "'The Bear' is no longer a war story that takes place in a kitchen. It is now a sports story that takes place in a kitchen."

Vanity Fair's Rebecca Ford and David Canfield praised Jamie Lee Curtis's acting for her guest appearances throughout the season as Donna, including the season finale, suggesting she should be in consideration for an Emmy for her work on the show.

=== Accolades ===
Award	Category	Nominee	Result	Ref.
American Society of Cinematographers Awards	Outstanding Achievement in Cinematography in Episode of a Half-Hour Series for Television	Andrew Wehde	Nominated	
Primetime Emmy Awards	Outstanding Lead Actor in a Comedy Series	Jeremy Allen White	Won	

== See also ==
- List of The Bear episodes
- The Bear season two

== Sources ==
- n.a. (2024). The Encyclopedia of Pasta: over 350 recipes for the ultimate comfort food. Encyclopedia Cookbooks. Nashville, Tennessee: Cider Mill Press. ISBN 978-1-4003-4610-3.
- Alter, Rebecca (July 6, 2023). "The Real Chefs Behind The Bear Made Way More Than 7 Fishes". Vulture.
