= List of The Bear characters =

FX/Hulu series (2022–2026)

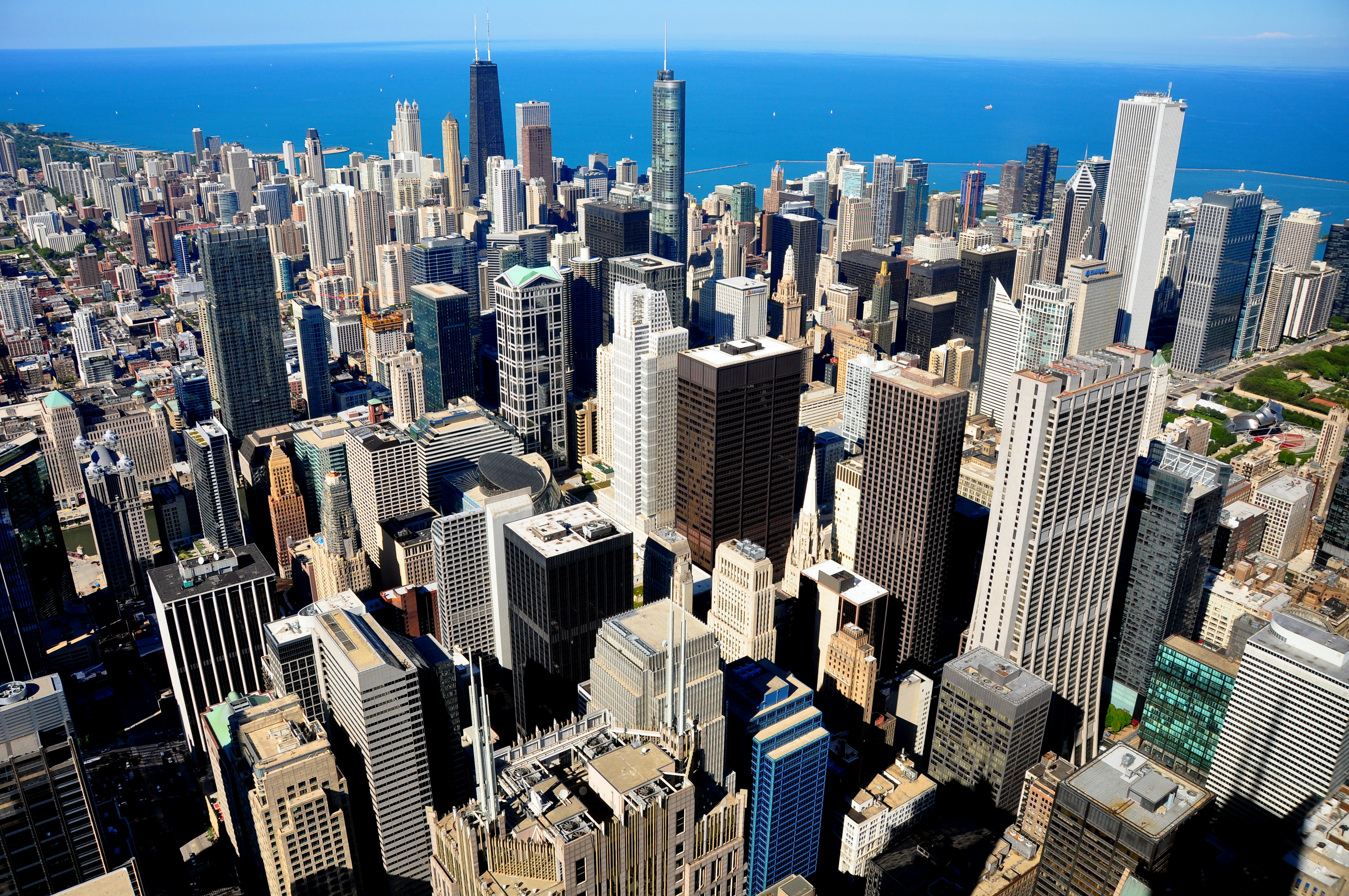
The Berzatto family lives and works in the Chicago metropolitan area

The characters of the FX Networks television series The Bear, an American family dramedy television program launched in 2022, are predominantly people who work with the Berzattos at family businesses including a semi-seedy Italian beef sandwich shop, the Original Beef of Chicagoland. The Beef is later transformed into a high-end dinner destination (with a window on the side, for sandwiches) known as the Bear. The series is set in Chicago, Illinois, United States.

== Cast list ==
Color key:
Top-billed cast
Three or more appearances per season
One or two appearances per season

Character	Actor	Appearances					
Character	Actor	Season 1	Season 2	Season 3	Season 4	Season 5	Special
Main cast
Carmy Berzatto	Jeremy Allen White	Main	Main	Main	Main	Main	(Note: White, Edebiri, Boyce, Colón-Zayas, Elliott, and Matheson are all listed as main cast in the end titles but do not appear onscreen in "Gary.")
Richie Jerimovich	Ebon Moss-Bachrach	Main	Main	Main	Main	Main	Main
Sydney Adamu	Ayo Edebiri	Main	Main	Main	Main	Main	
Marcus Brooks	Lionel Boyce	Main	Main	Main	Main	Main	
Tina Marrero	Liza Colón-Zayas	Main	Main	Main	Main	Main	
Natalie Berzatto	Abby Elliott	Main	Main	Main	Main	Main	
Neil Fak	Matty Matheson	Recurring	Main	Main	Main	Main	
Ebra	Edwin Lee Gibson	Recurring	Recurring	Recurring	Main	Main	
Recurring cast
Gary "Sweeps" Woods	Corey Hendrix	Recurring	Recurring	Recurring	Recurring	Recurring	
Chi-Chi	Christopher Zucchero	Recurring		Recurring	Recurring	Recurring	
Manny	Richard Esteras	Recurring	Recurring	Recurring	Recurring	Recurring	
Angel	José Cervantes Jr.	Recurring	Recurring	Recurring	Recurring	Recurring	
Pete Katinsky	Chris Witaske	Recurring	Recurring	Recurring	Recurring	Recurring	
Chef David Fields	Joel McHale	Recurring	Guest	Guest			
Chester	Carmen Christopher	Recurring	Recurring	Guest	Recurring	Guest	
Jimmy "Cicero" Kalinowski	Oliver Platt	Guest	Recurring	Recurring	Recurring	Recurring	
Angela Brooks	Alma Washington		Recurring				
Claire Bear	Molly Gordon		Recurring	Recurring	Recurring	Guest	
Emmanuel Adamu	Robert Townsend		Recurring	Guest	Recurring	Guest	
Josh	Alex Moffat		Recurring				
Ted Fak	Ricky Staffieri		Recurring	Recurring	Recurring	Recurring	
Daniela	Isa Arciniegas		Recurring				
Connor	Jack Lancaster		Recurring				
Chef Adam Shapiro	Adam Shapiro		Guest	Recurring	Recurring		
Tiffany Jerimovich	Gillian Jacobs	Guest (Note: Uncredited voice role in season one.)	Guest	Guest	Recurring	Guest	Guest
Jess	Sarah Ramos		Guest	Guest	Recurring	Recurring	
Garrett	Andrew Lopez		Guest	Guest	Recurring	Recurring	
Rene	Rene Gube		Guest	Guest	Recurring	Recurring	
The Computer	Brian Koppelman			Guest	Recurring	Recurring	
Chuckie	Paulie James			Guest	Recurring	Recurring	
Donna Berzatto	Jamie Lee Curtis		Guest	Guest	Recurring	Recurring	
Albert Schnur	Rob Reiner				Recurring		
Chef Luca	Will Poulter		Guest	Guest	Recurring	Recurring	
Cheese	Elsie Fisher					Recurring	
Guest cast
Delivery guy	P. J. Fishwick	Guest					
Nancy Chore	Amy Morton	Guest					
Al-Anon leader	Molly Ringwald	Guest					
Uncle Frank	Mick Napier	Guest					
Mikey Berzatto	Jon Bernthal	Guest	Guest	Guest	Guest		Guest
Eva Jerimovich	Annabelle Toomey		Guest	Guest	Guest	Guest	
Naiya	CG		Guest				
Kelly	Mitra Jouhari		Guest	Guest	Guest	Guest	
Kyle	James Swanberg		Guest		Guest		
Stevie	John Mulaney		Guest	Guest	Guest	Guest	
Lee Lane	Bob Odenkirk		Guest		Guest	Guest	
Michelle Berzatto	Sarah Paulson		Guest		Guest		
Carol	Maura Kidwell		Guest				
Chef Andrea Terry	Olivia Colman		Guest	Guest			
David	David Zayas			Guest	Guest	Guest	
Frank	Josh Hartnett			Guest	Guest	Guest	
Peter Clark	Gary Janetti				Guest	Guest	
Chantel	Danielle Deadwyler				Guest		
T.J.	Arion King				Guest		
Georgie	Kate Berlant				Guest		
Francie Fak	Brie Larson				Guest		
"Crazy" Mary Heyman	Deirdre O'Connell					Guest	
Allan Mitchell	Brad Morris					Guest	
Mr. Dearborn	Peter Grosz					Guest	
James Brooks	Harry Lennix					Guest	
Sue	Bonnie Hunt					Guest	
Sherri	Marin Ireland						Guest

== Nuclear family ==
The core Berzatto family consists of the unnamed long-absent father "Pop," mom Donna, the kids Mikey, Sugar, and Bear, and Cousin Richie, a biologically unrelated neighborhood kid who grew up in the family as Mikey's best friend and a de facto foster sibling. The pilot script suggests that Richie has a decade or two on Carmy.

=== Carmy Berzatto ===
The youngest sibling, Carmen Anthony Berzatto (Jeremy Allen White), moved back to Chicago following the death of his brother Mikey. Carmy is "a chain-smoking baddie, but he's also a grieving brother, a prodigal son, a self-lacerating overachiever, and a bewildered product of chaos and dysfunction." He left Chicago fairly young to train and work as a chef; he transformed himself from an "insecure, friendless slacker from a troubled home" into a white-hot name on the American culinary scene, cooking at the best restaurants in America and collecting racks of awards. Since returning home, he has reluctantly, incrementally moved into Mikey's place as the acknowledged leader of the family. Carmy is played by Jeremy Allen White. He appears in all episodes of the series except "Napkins," "Ice Chips," "Worms," and "Gary".

=== Sugar ===
Natalie Berzatto (Abby Elliott), born 1988, is the middle sibling by birth order. She is close with her surviving brother, Carmy. Originally opposed to Carmy's attempts to rehabilitate the Beef, she left her job at a bank when she was recruited by Carmy's partner Chef Sydney to serve as business manager for the forthcoming Bear restaurant. Sugar appears in the pilot and in all subsequent episodes except "Review," "Napkins," Worms," and "Gary."

=== Pete ===
Pete Katinsky (Chris Witaske) is Natalie's kind and loving husband and baby Sophie's dad. When Pete was first introduced, he appeared to be "universally disliked by the family, [but] he turns out to be just a big softie—perhaps naive to the others' hardened ways, but charming because of his kind manner and willingness to look for the best in everyone." Pete works as a lawyer and helps the family with contracts for the restaurant. Pete, a recurring character, first appears in "Hands" in season 1.

=== Sophie Katinsky ===
Sophie is an infant, Natalie and Pete's first child, born the first week of August 2023. She was born in the episode "Ice Chips," and her name was revealed in the episode "Replicants" when she was introduced to the restaurant-dwelling Bears. The Liszka twins played Sophie in "Replicants," "Sophie," and "Green." Sophie's favorite toy in season 5 is a honeybee.

=== Mikey Berzatto ===
Michael Berzatto (Jon Bernthal) shot himself in the head on the State Street Bridge a few months before the opening of the series. The loud, lionized, charismatic, and larger-than-life oldest brother of the family, Mikey was first described by Uncle Jimmy in the second episode of the series: "No disrespect...your brother, he was an animal, surrounded by dickheads, and then he lost his mind, and now he put you in a real tough spot." Mikey typically appears in one main flashback per season, and is a central character in the "Gary" special.

=== Donna Berzatto ===
Donna Berzatto (Jamie Lee Curtis) is a proud mother and a troubled figure with apparent addiction and mental health issues that have impeded her relationships, particularly with her three biological children, Mikey, Sugar, and Bear. Curtis guest stars in seasons 2 and 3, and recurs in seasons 4 and 5.

=== "Pop" Berzatto ===
The name of the Berzatto dad is unknown and it is unclear if he is alive or dead.

== Sydney Adamu ==
Sydney Adamu (Ayo Edebiri) is an excellent, classically trained Chicago-native chef who appears in the pilot as a potential new hire for the Original Beef of Chicagoland. Sydney's goals, as listed at the top of her résumé, are "to obtain a chef's position with the possibility of creative freedoms and the opportunity for management" and "to respect the wisdom of traditional cuisines through a modern lens." Syd's training and work experience includes cooking school at the Culinary Institute of America (CIA) in Hyde Park, New York, and stints at Smoque, Avec, and Alinea.

Carmy hires her full-time in the second episode and they set to work restoring the Beef and aspire to sustained profitability. Jeremy Allen White told The Daily Beast in 2024 that there was a "real platonic intimacy to [Carmy and Sydney's] relationship. They're incredibly reliant on one another. That's a beautiful thing...I feel like Syd's voice can get through to him because he sees her potential...He has a lot of respect for her abilities. In a lot of ways, she is so many things that Carmy is not." Conversely, Sydney all but worships Carmy as a chef but takes pains not to let him know the extent of her admiration.

Sydney has been described as Carmy's "best friend and kindred spirit." By season 4, Carmy and Syd are broadly acknowledged as "the two main characters," and "we see...that Carmy trusts and cares for [Syd] like he does his own sister. Like Tiffany, she's a Bear forever if she wants to be." Syd was Richie's date to his ex-wife's wedding, and he introduced her to his daughter as "Auntie Sydney." Sydney appears in all episodes of the series except "Fishes," "Napkins" (which Edebiri directed), "Ice Chips, and "Gary."

=== Syd's family ===
Emmanuel Adamu (Robert Townsend), a widower who raised only-child Sydney by himself, is introduced in the season 2 episode "Pasta" and is a recurring character, appearing in four episodes of season 2, two episodes of season 3, five episodes of season 4, and the season 5 series finale.

Sydney's cousin Chantel (Danielle Deadwyler), and Chantel's daughter T.J. (Arion King), are introduced in the Sydney-centric season 4 episode "Worms." Deadwyler played Miranda on the HBO miniseries Station Eleven, which was produced and directed by The Bear executive producer Hiro Murai.

== Extended family: Cousins ==
=== Richie Jerimovich & Evie ===
Richard Lawrence Jerimovich (Ebon Moss-Bachrach) is a de facto Berzatto sibling but not biological kin. He was Mikey's best friend, and told Chef Terry, "My best friend's ma was like my ma." He ran the Original Beef with Mikey and works front of house at the Bear. He has a competitive, often-hostile relationship with Carmy, but when prompted, he told a friend of a friend, "I am indeed his cousin...I love him very much...but please don't tell him." Richie "cosplays Italian" but he is probably of Polish-American (or possibly Ukrainian) heritage. Nonetheless, Richie "embodies some essential tropes of old-fashioned Italian American masculinity, such as loudness, a hot temper, and impulsivity—as well as his use of vernacular Italian words and hand gestures."

Richie has a daughter named Eva Jerimovich (Annabelle Toomey) with his ex-wife, Tiff. Mikey was the one who suggested the name Eva. As early as episode two, Richie "reveals his empathy and thoughtfulness, attentively listening to Eva's concerns, openly expressing his love for her, and asking to be updated soon about her settling in the new environment."

Richie is a lead character in the series, appearing in all episodes except for "Ice Chips" and "Worms." Toomey's first appearance is in "Sundae" in season 2, with later scenes in "Violet," "Apologies," "Bears," and "The Original Beef of Chicagoland."

=== Tiffany Jerimovich ===
Tiffany (Gillian Jacobs) is Richie's ex-wife and the mother of Evie. Tiff and Richie divorced sometime prior to the beginning of the series. Jacobs told The Hollywood Reporter in 2024, "I do feel like she ended it, but I don't know what her breaking point was." Tiffany told Richie in "Forks" that she was engaged to be married to another man. Tiff and Richie remain devoted co-parents Evie, which keeps them connected, said Jacobs in 2025: "There's always a connection there. She's engaged, which is not easy for Richie. But they treat each other with a lot of love and kindness even though there's a lot of sadness and regret there."

Jacobs is long-term partner of series creator Christopher Storer. Her first appearance as the character Tiff is an uncredited voice role in "Braciole," phoned in from Marseille where she was working on a TV show, and she has appeared periodically in all seasons, most prominently in the season 4 "Bears" episode set at her character's wedding, and in the 2026 special "Gary."

=== Frank ===
Frank (Josh Hartnett) is Tiff's second husband, and stepfather to Richie's daughter Evie. Frank's parents were schoolteachers. His parents got divorced. Frank has a tech company, F-Tap, that markets a keyless entry product. He is wealthy. GQ described him as "the ultimate tech bro, complete with a curated art collection." Frank wears a Movado Verso Chronograph watch. They have the wedding at his house and according to the invitation visible in "Apologies," he lives in the Gold Coast district of the city. Evie decided to refer to Frank, now her stepfather, as Waldo.

Hartnett has received positive reviews for his performance. Critics cited his ability to integrate effectively with the existing style of the series and felt that Hartnett’s Frank "slid right in unnoticed." A guest star, Hartnett appears in "Violet", "Bears", and "The Original Beef of Chicagoland".

=== Michelle Berzatto ===
Believed to be a biological cousin to the Berzatto kids, Michelle Berzatto (Sarah Paulson) is an actress. As seen in "Bears," she has star tattoos on the back of her neck. Paulson appears in the Christmas flashback "Fishes" and the wedding episode "Bears." Tara Ariano of Cracked described Paulson as "enjoyably natural" in the part.

=== Cousin Stevie ===
Michelle's husband is Stevie (John Mulaney). Stevie is originally from California, and was born around 1975. Stevie is "clever and erudite" and adept at Berzatto family gatherings. Michelle and Stevie let Carmy crash on their couch when he worked in New York. In season 4, Stevie and Michelle attend Tiff's wedding to Frank. In season 5, Stevie helps Carmy attempt to get a job at an architectural firm.

Mulaney is a Chicago native who was born in 1982. Critics praised Mulaney of bringing his intelligent, humanistic observational comedy style to character of Stevie, who says grace over the dinner table at "Fishes," honoring the values embodied in such a family gathering while still finding an opportunity to ask the powers that be to "please give Michael the strength to not throw that fork." Mulaney appears in "Fishes" "Tomorrow", "Bears" and "The Original Beef of Chicagoland".

== Restaurant family: Bearitos ==
When Mikey bequeathed the Beef to his brother, Carmy effectively inherited seven mouths to feed, all virtual strangers except for Richie. Richie, Sydney, Marcus, Tina (Liza Colón-Zayas), Ebra (Edwin Lee Gibson), Sweeps (Corey Hendrix), Manny (Richard Esteras), Angel (José Cervantes Jr.), Charles "Chuckie" DiValentino (Paulie James), Christopher "Chi-Chi" Zucchero (Christopher Zucchero), Neil Geoff Fak (Matty Matheson), and Theodore Fak (Ricky Staffieri) all work at the Beef and/or the Bear at various times. Colón-Zayas and Gibson have both spoken about how their characters are motivated by their love of the Berzattos and their workplace family.

=== Tina Marrero ===
Tina Marrero, a main character in the series, was hired as a line cook for the Original Beef by Mikey and goes to culinary school to retrain as a sous chef at the Bear. In season 5, Syd asks her to be chef de cuisine at the Bear.

=== Marcus Brooks ===
A main character in the series, Marcus was the bread baker at the Original Beef of Chicagoland and began experimenting with pastry after Carmy took over the restaurant. He spends much of season 2 concerned with his terminally ill mother (Alma Washington as Angela Brooks), and in season 5 he reconnects with his long-absent father, James Brooks, who is played by Harry Lennix, a Chicago native and veteran actor who costarred in Robert Townsend's 1991 The Five Heartbeats.

=== Ebra ===
Ebra is a veteran soldier who emigrated from Somalia to the United States. He works the grill at the Original Beef and runs the sandwich window at the Bear. Edwin Lee Gibson's Ebra is a recurring character in seasons 1 through 3, and main character in seasons 4 and 5, when he sought to "create opportunity" for the family and hunt down a hyena who was stealing spoons from the family. Gibson appeared in 36 episodes of The Bear.

=== Sweeps ===
A retired pro baseball player, Gary "Sweeps" Woods swept the floors and worked as a runner at the Original Beef, and after the launch of the Bear, works as the restaurant's sommelier and runs the restaurant's profitable beverage program. Sweeps is a recurring character in seasons 1 through 5. Corey Hendrix appeared in 34 episodes of The Bear.

=== Neil Fak ===
Neil Fak is a childhood friend of the Berzattos and handyman for the restaurant. Matheson has worked as an executive chef and restaurateur, and is a credited producer of The Bear. Matheson first appeared in the pilot episode and recurred in six episodes on season 1 before being promoted to a series regular for seasons 2 through 5.

Neil Fak's neckties are The Bear costume designer Courtney Wheeler's "pride and joy." Wheeler told another interviewer that Neil and Ted have made matching outfits one of their annual Christmas traditions. For Christmas 2018, Fak brothers are wearing identical L.L. Bean green plaid flannel shirts that are "buttoned all the way up" with a rust-orange sweaters "draped over their shoulders." A limited-edition line of Fakwear was sold through J. Crew in 2024. Matter of Fak Supply company gear offered at J. Crew locations in Los Angeles, Chicago, and New York advertised their services: electrical, appliance installation and repair, plumbing, HVAC, drywall, and painting. The collection "sold out within days" and got 5x standard menswear engagement on the retailer's Instagram.

=== Manny and Angel ===
Manny and Angel are the dishwashers at the Beef and later the Bear. Manny rides the bus to work. Angel, like the actor who plays him, always wears a Chicago White Sox baseball cap. Manny and Angel are English-Spanish bilingual.

During a 2024 panel discussion on socio-economic class representation on The Bear, Chicago Tribune TV critic Nina Metz and food reporter Ahmed Ali Akbar agreed they wanted more insight into Manny and Angel, with Metz saying: "I was curious about the dishwashers at The Bear. Who are they? What are their stories?...What do they make of all the shouting in the kitchen?...Do dishwashers ever socialize with kitchen staff, or is there a pretty clear class line dividing them?"

Cervantes and Esteras both appeared in 25 episodes.

=== Chi-Chi ===
Chi-Chi is played by Chris Zucchero, who has been friends with Christopher Storer since kindergarten and whose father opened the Mr. Beef sandwich shop on which the Original Beef is based. The pilot was filmed at Mr. Beef. In-universe, Chi-Chi and Carmy hung out at the shop when they were young, slicing bread and wiping down tables. Chi-Chi has been employed at the shop on and off for years. He currently works the sandwich window with Ebra and Chuckie. Zucchero recurs in seasons 1, 3, and 4.

=== Chuckie ===
Chuckie worked for the Berzattos on and off at the Beef, along with Chi-Chi and Richie. He is one of the "nephs" who call Computer "Uncle Computer." He comes back to help with the sandwich window in two episodes of season 3. James, a real-life sandwich shop entrepreneur, recurs in seven episodes of season 4 selling beefs with Ebra and Chi-Chi.

== Restaurant family: Evers ==
Carmy, Luca (Will Poulter), Rene (Rene Gube), Garrett (Andrew Lopez), Jess (Sarah Ramos), and Adam Shapiro (Adam Shapiro) all worked for Andrea Terry (Olivia Colman) at one time or another at a Michelin-starred restaurant called Ever. Carmy and Luca's tattoos were designed by the same tattoo artist, Benny Shields. After Chef Terry retired and closed her restaurant, Richie hired Rene, Garrett, and Chef Jess to work front of house, and Carmy brought in Chef Luca to stage and help pastry chef Marcus, whom he had helped train at Noma in Denmark. These characters were introduced in season 2 but by season 4, "if Luca and Jess felt like ancillary figures before, they're full-fledged cousins now."

=== Chef Terry ===
Andrea Terry is an acclaimed Chicago chef, originally from Great Britain, whose restaurant Ever won three Michelin stars in its first year and maintained the rating for 12 years. She has launched many young and hungry chefs including Carmy, Luca, Adam Shapiro, and David Fields. She closed her restaurant at the end of season 3. Colman guest-starred as Chef Terry in "Forks" and in three episodes of season 3.

=== Luca ===
Luca is a top-tier British chef who worked as Carmy's sous at Ever and trained Marcus when he staged in the bakery department at Noma in Copenhagen. Luca first appeared in "Honeydew," and appeared in two episodes of season 3 and four episodes of season 4. He and Marcus have a close relationship, and he is one of Carmy's most trusted friends and former colleagues.

=== Jess ===
Jess has spent her career in restaurants and worked her way up to being a top-class service expeditor. She and Richie have developed a close relationship since they met in "Forks." She and Luca both mentored Tina when they joined the Bear. Ramos guest-starred in two episodes of season 3 and was a recurring character in seven episodes of season 4.

=== Garrett ===
Garrett trained Richie during his front-of-house stage at the Michelin-starred restaurant Ever, and later joined the crew at the Bear. Lopez guest-starred in seasons 2 and 3, and appeared in five episodes of season 4.

=== Rene ===
Rene ran front-of-house at Ever and later joined the Bear. Gube is an executive producer of the show, and a writer for The Bear since season 1. Gube guest-starred in seasons 2 and 3, and appeared in five episodes of season 4.

=== Adam Shapiro ===
Technically an Ever, Adam Shapiro seems to be a curious and perhaps unclassifiable outlier from the main restaurant family. In "Forks," while staging front of house at Ever, Richie witnessed Shapiro erupt "into a torrent of verbal abuse aimed at Garrett...Chef Adam's behavior [was] excessive and vicious." In the season 3 premiere "Tomorrow," he appeared fleetingly in a flashback to the Ever kitchen, where younger Adam, Luca, and Carmy were doing prep for Andrea Terry, during which "Shapiro enviously peered over" at Carmy and Luca. At the time, all three were shelling peas, Luca twice as fast as Adam, and Carmy three or four times faster than Luca.

After losing his job as chef de cuisine at Ever due to chef Terry's retirement, Shapiro attempted to poach Syd from Carmy for his own place, a practice that was established in season 2 as being bad form in the Chicago restaurant world—when Syd pitched some cooks taking a smoke break in a back alley, she was "rightfully shut down and cursed out by their chef, who [caught] her red-handed". Shapiro has a habit of "talking some smack on Carmy."

Adam Shapiro first approached Sydney at the Bear's L-train stop on approximately July 7 ("Violet"). He first broached the job opportunity on or around August 1 ("Legacy"), reiterated it on August 7 at the Ever funeral ("Forever"), and encouraged Sydney to come visit his restaurant space on Sunday, September 17 ("Worms"). He repeatedly told Syd that there was a ticking clock attached to his job offer to her. In "Legacy," Shapiro took Sydney to breakfast on the back patio of Doma Café in River North. Doma specializes in Croatian-American food and is known for their ćevapi and their breakfast sandwiches.

Syd agreed to look at paperwork for the new job at the end of "Worms." At the end of the "Bears" episode Sydney seems to be having second thoughts about leaving the Bears for Chef Shapiro's new restaurant and she ultimately turned down Shapiro the first week of October.

Decider columnist A. J. Daulerio wrote of Sydney's refusal that, "Shapiro [took] the news poorly and pathetically, sulking and stewing...Shapiro's seams were destined to burst; better for Syd that it happened now than while she was working for him." As Slate magazine writer Nadira Goffe wrote about the season 4 episode "Worms," "There's no good way to describe Shapiro's whole deal. He talks at breakneck speed, like he's constantly coked out, and every notion, comment, or phrase he relays to Sydney has the air of a white man who wants to be cool and thinks that proximity to Black culture will get him there. Sydney is at the receiving end of his remarks, which range from annoying utterances to blithe microaggressions."

Shapiro is played by Adam Shapiro. Chris Storer invited him to play a chef on the show in part because he knew of Shapiro's business selling Philly-style soft pretzels.

== Extended family: Uncles and aunts ==
The series has several characters referred to as uncles. With the exception of Lee Lane, who is repeatedly declaimed as "not our uncle," it is unclear if any of them have a biological or a past or present legal relationship to anybody or what that relationship might be. Most seem to simply be avuncular patriarchs.

=== Uncle Jimmy ===
James "Cicero" Kalinowski was once best friends with the father of the Berzatto children and cared for the kids the best that he could after their dad abandoned the family. He loves Mikey, Sugar, and Carmy (and Richie, but very much less so) but also thinks "the Berzatto department has a brain issue." Jimmy has been married at least twice.

Jimmy is played by Oliver Platt. Platt's older brother Adam Platt has been the restaurant reviewer for New York magazine since 2000 and won a James Beard Award for his reviews. Recurring character Jimmy first appears in the second episode of the first season, "Hands."

=== Aunt Gail ===
Aunt Gail was Jimmy's first wife. Auntie Gail was with Donna while she gave birth to Natalie, but the kids only really know her from stories and photos. The picture of Aunt Gail from "Tonnato" depicts Platt with his real-life wife Camilla Campbell in 1992.

=== Aunt Carol, and Nicky Kalinowski ===
Uncle Jimmy has a teenager, Nicky, with his current wife, Carol. Carmy catered Nicky's birthday party in "Dogs." Carol appeared in the season 2 episodes "Fishes" and "The Bear." Carol is played by Maura Kidwell, a guest star in two episodes of season 2. Nicky Kalinowski is played by Sebastian Merlo in the season 1 episode "Dogs."

=== Uncle Lee ===
Not biologically related, Lee Lane was in business with "Pop" Berzatto and Uncle Jimmy. They had a company called KBL Electric (Kalinowski–Berzatto–Lane). Lee seemingly later became Donna's on-again, off-again boyfriend. On separate occasions, when someone mentioned "Uncle Lee," both Mikey and Carmy immediately said, "That's not our uncle." Cousin Stevie described Lee to Syd as "a man I've met nine times, and I still don't know who he is." Lee has attempted to ingratiate himself with the clan but has "failed miserably." Lee is played by Bob Odenkirk. Guest star Odenkirk, a Chicago native, appears in "Fishes", "Bears", and "The Original Beef of Chicagoland". Critic Alan Sepinwall called the single scene that Odenkirk and White shared in "Bears" a "spectacular little duet."

In the episode "Fishes," Lee reacts to a mention of bears by listing "85? 41? 63?" (which were championship seasons for the Chicago Bears). When redirected with the comment "animal," he replies "Oh, Mongo," meaning Steve McMichael, an American football player who was a defensive tackle for the Chicago Bears in 191 games from 1981–1993. Michelle replied that she doesn't know what baseball player he's talking about, at which remark Lee scoffs and sighs in aggravation, and mutters, "Oh, God. These holidays are exhausting." Odenkirk co-created, with Robert Smigel, the series of Saturday Night Live sketches that popularized the catchphrase "Da Bears!" in a specific rendering of the Chicago accent. Vulture recapper Marah Eakin wrote, "I like to imagine Uncle Lee existing in the same universe as Bill Swerski's Super Fans."

=== Uncle Computer ===
The Computer, government name Nicholas Marshall, is called "Uncle Computer" by both Richie and Chuckie. Marshall is a "math wizard who literally 'computes' where the restaurant is overspending." Computer dresses in Las Vegas Raiders gear. Sugar has known him her whole life. He coached Mikey's Little League team. He is nice to Pete. The Computer is played by Brian Koppelman. BuzzFeed commented in 2025, that Computer is often "perfectly aggravating...[and] kind of makes you want to throw your phone at the screen, which means Koppelman did his job."

A poster for the movie Rounders is visible on the wall in the basement in the episode "Beef". The Bear creator Christopher Storer has described Brian Koppelman and David Levien, who co-wrote the screenplay for Rounders, as mentors and friends, and they helped The Bear license a specific hard-to-get song in season 2. Koppelman appeared in 13 episodes of the show beginning in season 3. Computer wears a USS Alabama (SSBN-731) cap throughout season 5, which suggests that Computer is either a former submariner or a fan of the 1995 Tony Scott film Crimson Tide.

== Miscellaneous ==
=== David Fields ===
David Fields was executive chef at "the best restaurant in America," Empire in New York City. Carmy Berzatto was his chef de cuisine, and Fields made his life hell with a cascade of verbal abuse and emotional manipulation. A Food & Wine writer commented about Fields in 2024, that while the actor did a "fantastic job," the character "is a complete cartoon. Fields is everything awful about working in the restaurant industry, thrown together into one character. He whispers demoralizing insults to Carmy as he plates precise dishes, puts down his ingredient and techniques ideas, repeatedly tells him that he will never be successful, and does it all in a menacing whisper. There are mean, horrible, toxic chefs out there, but even they are human." Fields has some past association with Ever, as he attended the restaurant's funeral. Joel McHale told Seth Meyers he was playing Fields as a dramatized amalgam of a young Thomas Keller and former Eleven Madison Park chef Daniel Humm, but FX publicists deny Fields is based on Keller. McHale told interviewers that he has never met either chef and was given no other background information on Fields so he simply performed the role as he saw fit, based on the script as written. A number of notable chefs have faced credible accusations of psychological and even physical abuse, including the late Charlie Trotter of Chicago, and Carmy's in-universe past employer, René Redzepi of Copenhagen. McHale appeared as Fields in flashbacks in three episodes of season 1, in Carmy's anxiety-fevered brain in the finale of season 2, and in the first and last episodes of season 3. In "Forever," Luca comments that Fields "used to be one of the best chefs in the world," hinting at some decline in his culinary fortunes since Carmy's departure from Empire.

=== Nancy Chore ===
Broadway veteran Amy Morton plays Chicago Board of Health inspector Nancy Chore, taking over for "Chicago Ron" Pager, in "Hands."

=== Chester ===
Chester is Marcus' roommate; he may have a crush on Marcus. Chester is "designer with a side hustle as a real estate agent, and his mix of awkwardness and bravado is a source of much humor." The costume department dresses him in "vintage suits, a lot of Drake's, a lot of Brooks Brothers." Chester is played by Carmen Christopher. Chester appears in 12 episodes of the series.

=== Ballbreaker voice ===
Paul Rudd, in an uncredited role, provided the videogame voice for Fak's conversation with Ballbreaker in the season 1 finale. Rudd, a friend of Christopher Storer, "recurs" in season 2 as an autographed celebrity photo in the old Beef (along with Anthony Bourdain, and Harold Ramis), and as a demon-possessed cardboard cutout of himself in season 5.

=== Claire Dunlap ===
Claire Dunlap, an emergency department physician and childhood neighbor of the Berzattos, had a six-week sexual relationship with Carmy in season two. Claire Bear is played by Molly Gordon.

=== Josh ===
Alex Moffat plays line cook Josh in four episodes of season 2, beginning in "Honeydew." Marcus says Josh is smoking crack in the alley behind the restaurant, but actor Alex Moffat thought his character was smoking meth. One critic wrote that the storyline "manages to paint drug use as an often overlooked phenomenon in the workplace while weaving a sense of humor in the revelation and subsequent reactions."

=== Kelly ===
Introduced in the episode "Pop" as having been recently dumped by her boyfriend of five years, Claire's friend and roommate Kelly met Ted Fak at the restaurant's Friends & Family night, and Ted and Kelly started dating. Ted introduced Kelly around as his girlfriend at the "Bears" wedding, and he told her he loved her and she reciprocated. Kelly is played by Mitra Jouhari.

=== Kyle ===
Kyle, also known as K.J., is a neighborhood guy who went to school with Carmy. They were on the wrestling team together. Claire and Carmy encounter him at a house party. Kyle "fuck[s] with the Ambien a little too much," and has an arrest record for stealing cellphones and setting off illegal fireworks. Kyle reappears at Frank and Tiffany's wedding. Kyle is played by guest star James Swanberg in two episodes, "Pop" and "Bears."

=== Ted Fak ===
Theodore Fak, Neil's brother, was introduced in the season 2 episode "Fishes." In season 3, Neil was "promoted," and Ted took over "as the fix-it Fak" at the restaurant. Like his onscreen sibling Neil (Matheson), Staffieri is a credited producer of The Bear. Staffieri was cast as an Al-Anon participant in season 1 but the scene was cut for time. Staffieri first appeared in "Fishes" and returned for the restaurant-launch episodes "Omelette" and "The Bear," nine episodes of season 3, seven episodes of season 4, and all eight episodes of season 5. Ted described his feelings for Kelly in terms of "like being in a Disney Channel original movie, dawg," specifically Motocrossed, a teen-romcom adaptation of Shakespeare's Twelfth Night.

=== David ===
David is Tina's husband, played by Colón-Zayas' real-life husband David Zayas. Colón-Zayas described her reaction to discovering Tina and David's onscreen marriage was ideal: "Yes, she's dealing with the day-to-day struggles of gentrification, layoffs, and the rent being jacked up—those are the real pressures of being working poor. But even in my brain, I hadn't assumed what her home life was like, so I loved being caught off-guard." In another interview Colón-Zayas said she had expected Tina to be a single mom, but Tina's husband turned out to be very similar to her own: "I just loved how on point they were about him—this big, strong teddy bear, gentle. He's played a lot of villains in the past, and they nailed him [and] his personality so perfectly." David works as a doorman and later as a building manager. The couple shares an apartment with their teenage son Louie (Pedro Henrique). Henrique appears in one episode ("Review"); Zayas appears in five episodes beginning in season 3.

=== Further Faks ===
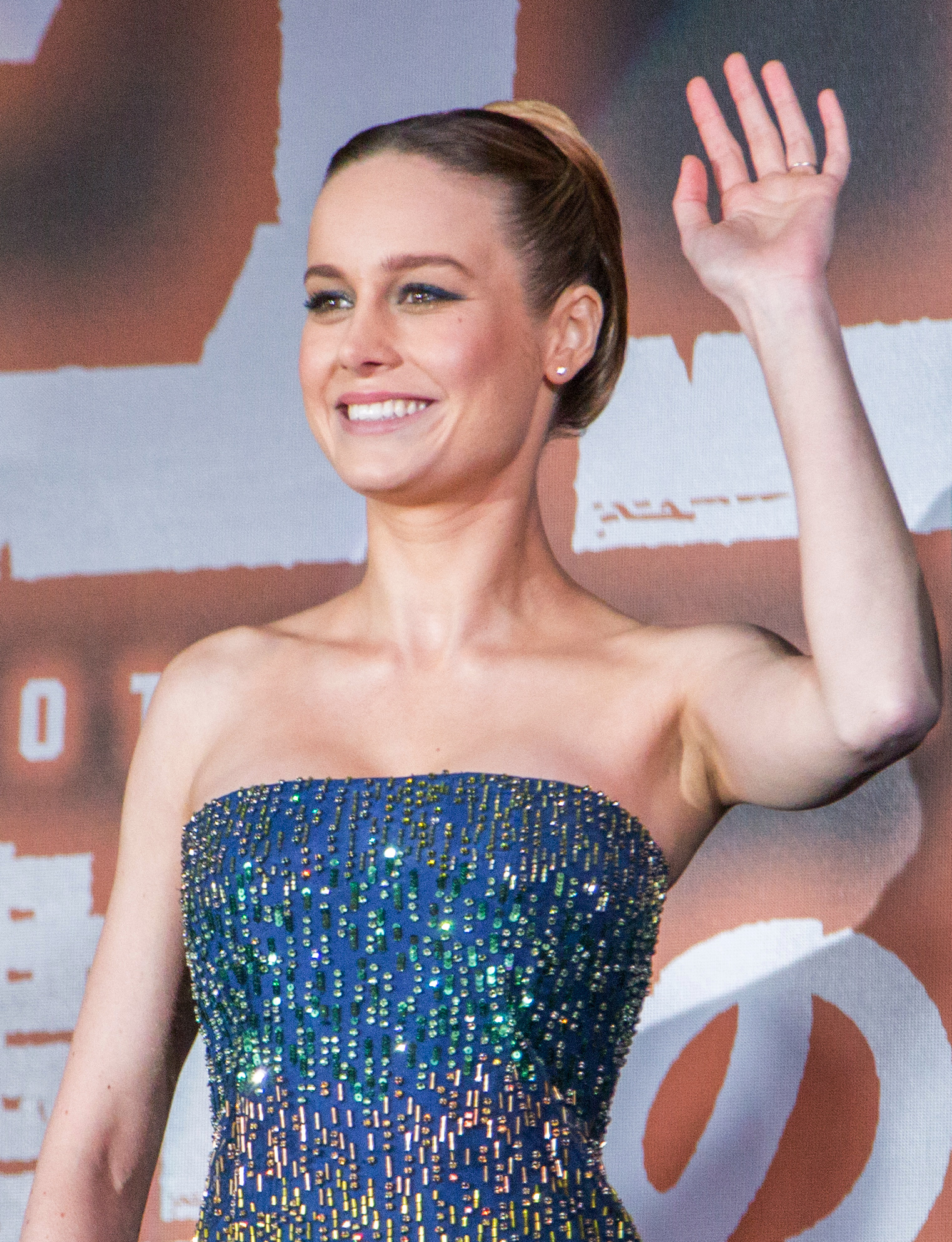
Brie Larson plays Francine Jean Fak, sister to eight and "micro-influencer"

The Berzatto and Fak families are related "through friendship." There are nine Fak siblings in the current generation, including seven brothers Neil Geoff Fak (Matty Matheson), Theodore Geoff Fak (Ricky Staffieri), Samuel Geoff Fak (John Cena), Avery Fak, Tex Fak, John John Fak, and Maurice Fak, and sister Francine Jean Fak (Brie Larson), with whom Sugar was once close. Other Faks mentioned in dialogue include Kenny Fak, Susan Fak, Frank Fak, Doug Fak, Gary Fak, and Big Neil, who once got other Faks skateboards. Big Neil is apparently the dad of Neil and Ted. Uncle Gary (William Reilly) says Big Neil is a prick. The casting of Cena as a Fak was widely derided as a mistake; one writer commented "this huge, muscular guy is a bridge too far. The Faks become more of a main ingredient than a seasoning in episode 5. Their banter is fun in a Marx Brothers way, even if I can't understand half of it." In the telling of the New York Times, many of the childhood neighborhood friends of Carmy, Natalie, and Richie are "knuckleheads by nature and are frequently used for comic relief. This is the case particularly with the bickering, bantering Fak brothers...whom some Bear fans love and some find exhausting."

The abundance of Fak scenes drew comment in reviews of season 3. One recapper wrote of the Fak doldrums, "I don't even want to think about—let alone write about—Neil and Ted bursting into the ER and begging Claire to take Carmy back. It's an absolutely psychotic thing for two adult men to do. At this point in the season, The Bear has become a downbeat drama with scenes spliced in from a wacky network sitcom called, like, The Faks of Life. (Just the Faks? Faks and Fiction? I dunno. We can workshop it.)" After the series finale, the television critic for TheWrap wrote on his Substack about the Faks:

My blood pressure goes up when they appear...The main thing about them is that they are ambiguously mentally challenged. They are grown men who have the intellectual and emotional capacity of children, and the show is kind of vague on how much of that is by choice on their part. The women on the show talk to the Faks like they're all their mommy. They end every sentence they say to them with 'sweetie' or 'my love' or whatever. It's disgusting, and speaks to the biggest problem with the Faks, and the show's humor in general, which is that it mistakes being intentionally annoying with being funny...They actively make the show stupider...The emotional realism of The Bear's drama gets undercut by the sitcommy falsity of the Faks' behavior and otherwise grounded characters' reactions to it.

=== Albert Schnur ===
Albert Schnur (Rob Reiner) is a business consultant, recommended by the South Side Business Academy, who helped Ebra with a business plan for the beef-sandwich window in season four. He appeared in three episodes: "Scallop," "Replicants," and "Tonnato." Introduced as someone with expertise in "everything from Fortune 500 companies to strip-mall laundromats," initially he seemed too good to be true. As Collider put it, "At first, we're not sure what to make of Albert: can he be a true mentor, or is he just there to swindle Ebraheim in some way?" But Schnur earned the viewer's trust after being introduced to the crew, including Chi-Chi and Paulie, examining the kitchen setup, and encountering the Computer outside the restaurant. Schnur ultimately proposes two beef-sandwich windows, located in the north and south suburbs, served by a central commissary kitchen.

Jamie Lee Curtis and Reiner's frequent collaborator Christopher Guest were married at Reiner's house in 1984. Curtis, who played Zooey Deschanel's character's mom Joan Day on the Fox comedy New Girl opposite Reiner as her dad Bob Day, encouraged Reiner to take the part, which he said he enjoyed doing because acting was low-stakes for him compared to the pressures of directing and producing. One reviewer described Reiner as a "borderline overqualified" guest star. Another reviewer said that Reiner and Gibson as Ebra were a "comedy dream team." In September 2025, Reiner told IndieWire that Storer "[directs and writes] the same way I do...You come to work and there's no division between what you're doing in front of the camera and off," adding that he "loved" working on the series.

After the murder of Reiner and his wife in December 2025, Brian Koppelman posted a tribute to Reiner on Instagram, recounting that in the one scene they shared, Reiner suggested a dialogue tweak that improved the scene. Collider noted that it was unclear what would become of the Beef window business plan, and "it's likely that the series, especially Ebraheim's storyline, will now have a somber tinge that just reminds us of what could have been had Reiner's life not been cut short." Hollywood Reporter TV critic Daniel Fienberg noted that Reiner's scenes "encouraging Edwin Lee Gibson's Ebra were among the highlights of the series' fourth season." Gibson said in 2026 that season 5 was emotional, because "he's not there and we fully expected him to be there, [it] changed a bit the trajectory of the story."

Ballbreaker, the arcade game in the old Beef, periodically exclaimed various suggestive catchphrases, including "Oh! I'll have what she's having!" in the pilot episode, which is a quote from Reiner's 1989 film When Harry Met Sally... Ebra is shown speaking on the phone with Schnur throughout season 5, regarding plans for the Beef. In the final conversation, Ebra says "as you wish," a line from Reiner's 1987 film The Princess Bride, in response to a suggestion made by Albert.

Reiner posthumously was nominated for and won a Primetime Emmy Award for Outstanding Guest Actor in a Comedy Series for his role as Schnur, his sixth acting nomination overall. Reiner's win prompted a long standing ovation at the awards ceremony, with friend and fellow The Bear star Curtis among those in the crowd.

=== Mr. Clark ===
TV writer and essayist Gary Janetti plays restaurant guest Peter Clark in "Scallop" and "The Original Beef of Chicagoland."

=== Georgie ===
Kate Berlant guest stars in one episode of season 4 as Georgie, a participant in Carmy's Al-Anon group who shares a story about an alocasia houseplant and/or living with her brother's addiction. Berlant's story mirrors the struggles of more familiar characters as they confront "the complicated relationships they have with those who are closest to them: the broken trust, the bitterness, and the self-destructiveness that festers owed to those things." The Bear creator Christopher Storer was an executive producer on Berlant's FX Networks comedy special Cinnamon on the Wind.

=== Sherri from Gary ===
Sherri from Gary is a woman Mikey meets in Indiana. She coaxes Mikey out of his truck and into a bar, where they connect emotionally while drinking together, sharing drugs, and nestling close to one another in a bathroom stall. She has red hair, and she loves trees. She says at one point that her mom's favorite film was Love in the Afternoon starring Gary Cooper (and Audrey Hepburn), but it is not clear if that statement is true or not. Sherri is played by guest star Marin Ireland in one episode, "Gary." Ireland and Bernthal had previously costarred in the Netflix small-town film noir miniseries His & Hers, and in a play staged in Ojai, California, Ironbound.

=== Cheese ===
Terry "Cheese" Cheddario, Computer's niece, has a head for business and advises Jimmy on possible solutions to his debt problems. Uncle Computer calls her Cheese Whiz for long, and Jimmy says he is going to call her Tough Love. Elsie Fisher plays Cheese in seven episodes of season 5. Chris Storer was a producer on the 2018 movie Eighth Grade, starring Fisher, which was directed by Storer's frequent collaborator Bo Burnham.

=== Other chefs, restaurateurs, and VIPs ===
Chefs and restaurateurs Dylan Patel, David Posey, Daniel Wat, and Eric Wat appear as themselves in season 2. Mike Salzinski is Tina's culinary school teacher. Chefs and restaurateurs Daniel Boulud, René Redzepi, Thomas Keller, Dario Monni, Joyce Chiu, Jonathan Zaragoza, Grant Achatz, Christina Tosi, Kevin Boehm, Wylie Dufresne, Will Guidara, Genie Kwon, Malcolm Livingston II, Anna Posey, Rosio Sanchez, and Dave Beran appear as themselves in season 3. Alpana Singh tutors novice sommelier Sweeps in season 4.

Chef and butcher Rob Levitt appears as himself in two episodes. Chicago restaurateur Donnie Madia plays himself in four episodes beginning in season 2. Chicago weatherman Tom Skilling is mentioned as a VIP guest at the Beef at the end of "Ceres" in season 1, and appears as himself as guest of the Bear in season 5.

== See also ==
- List of The Bear episodes
- Food of The Bear (TV series)
- Music of The Bear (TV series)
- Family on The Bear (TV series)

== Sources ==
- Di Maio, Cristina (2025). "New Italian American Fathering in the Time of the Gig Economy: The Case of The Bear". Diasporic Italy Journal of the Italian American Studies Association. 5. University of Illinois Press: 105–121. doi:10.5406/27697738.05.1.08. ISSN 2769-772X.
- Nikolova, Zlatina (March 2025). "Every second counts: Urban affect and culinary chaos in The Bear". The Journal of Popular Television. 13 (1): 43–59. doi:10.1386/jptv_00135_1. ISSN 2046-9861.
