= Tomorrow (The Bear) =

- The Bear episode
- Episode no.: Season 3 Episode 1
- Directed by: Christopher Storer
- Story by: Christopher Storer; Matty Matheson
- Teleplay by: Christopher Storer
- Cinematography by: Andrew Wehde
- Editing by: Joanna Naugle
- Production code: XCBV3001
- Original release date: June 26, 2024
- Running time: 37 minutes

Guest appearances
- Oliver Platt as Jimmy "Cicero" Kalinowski; Olivia Colman as Chef Andrea Terry; Edwin Lee Gibson as Ebraheim; Molly Gordon as Claire; Gillian Jacobs as Tiffany "Tiff" Jerimovich; Mitra Jouhari as Kelly; Joel McHale as Chef David Fields; John Mulaney as Stevie; Will Poulter as Chef Luca; Adam Shapiro as Adam Shapiro; Ricky Staffieri as Theodore Fak; David Zayas as David; Jon Bernthal as Michael "Mikey" Berzatto; Dave Beran as himself; Daniel Boulud as himself; René Redzepi as himself; Ben Cumings as server; Maddon Frye as young patient

Episode chronology
← Previous "The Bear"	Next → "Next"
- The Bear season 3

"Tomorrow" is the first episode of the third season of the American comedy-drama television series The Bear. It is the 19th overall episode of the series and was written by series creator Christopher Storer from a story he co-wrote with cast member Matty Matheson, and directed by Storer. It was released on Hulu on June 26, 2024, along with the rest of the season.

The series follows Carmen "Carmy" Berzatto, an award-winning chef de cuisine, who returns to his hometown of Chicago to run his late brother Michael's failing Italian beef sandwich shop and revamps the shop into a fine dining establishment, the Bear. In the episode, Carmy reminisces over his past experiences in other restaurants as he tries to move forward with the newly open River North place. The episode has scant dialogue; most of the spoken lines are fragments of memory, only a handful taking place in the contemporary timeline.

Jeremy Allen White was nominated for a Primetime Emmy Award for his performance in this episode.

== Plot ==
The episode is presented as a nonlinear, intertwining collection of flashbacks as Carmy goes to work the morning after the soft opening of The Bear. After establishing shots of the city of Chicago, Lake Michigan, and Carmy in his apartment, a title card states PART III.

=== Flashbacks ===
Carmy (Jeremy Allen White) spends years working for renowned chefs at various restaurants. He first stages at The French Laundry, then returns to Chicago to work for Chef Terry (Olivia Colman) alongside Luca (Will Poulter) at Ever, where he eventually rises to the CDC position. Impressed with Carmy's talent and dedication, Chef Terry sends him to Copenhagen to work at Noma under René Redzepi, an experience he cherishes.

Carmy returns home from Copenhagen for Christmas, but after a tumultuous family dinner, (Note: As seen in "Fishes".) he takes up his cousin Michelle's (Sarah Paulson) offer to move to New York City to pursue his career, where he stays with her and her boyfriend Stevie (John Mulaney). Sugar (Abby Elliott) sees him off at O'Hare, expresses a fear that she'll never see him again, and slips $1,000 in Carmy's jacket pocket, money that he had previously refused to take from her. Carmy often comes home from work at 3 a.m. and crashes out on Michelle and Stevie's couch. Stevie tucks him in properly with a blanket, complaining all the while, "You smell like a goddamn donkey," and spraying air freshener over him.

In New York, Carmy first works for Daniel Boulud at Daniel, and later David Fields at Empire, the latter of whom harshly criticizes and berates Carmy for his mistakes while instilling in him the "subtract" principle: using as few ingredients as possible. Carmy develops a hamachi dish with a blood orange sauce and garnish only for Fields to have him swap out the blood orange for fennel to exert his ownership over the dish, but Carmy discreetly substitutes one plate back with the blood orange, under the false pretense that the customer has a fennel allergy. This plate is served to Sydney (Ayo Edebiri). (Note: Sydney recounts this incident to Marcus in "Braciole" describing how she spent her money years ago exploring New York City's finest restaurants, and that her favorite dish was cooked by Carmy.)

While Carmy is working at Empire, Natalie calls him to inform him that Mikey (Jon Bernthal) has died by suicide. While the family attends the funeral, Carmy cannot bring himself to enter the church and stays in his car. From his vantage point on the street, he watches David comfort a sobbing Tina (Liza Colón-Zayas), and Ted Fak (Ricky Staffieri) escorts Tiff out of the church, while Richie (Ebon Moss-Bachrach) stands alone. Ebra (Edwin Lee Gibson) holds a piece of paper and stares into the middle distance. (Note: In a bit of continuity from the pilot, Neil is not with the group. In "System," Fak told Carmen he did not attend Michael's funeral, apologized, and said he sent flowers and he hoped they looked nice.) Carmy also recalls his conflict with Richie about ownership of The Beef, as seen in the pilot episode, "System."

There are a couple of scattered shots seemingly from Richie's point of view, as he calls someone, likely Mikey, from the Beef and leaves a frustrated voicemail, and bangs on a locked door at what appears to be Donna's house, shouting that it is time to go but seemingly getting no answer.

=== Present day ===
After being freed from the walk-in refrigerator, (Note: As seen in "The Bear".) Carmy apologizes to Sydney for having abandoned her during the soft opening. He later leaves a message to Richie apologizing for his tirade at him while trapped in the fridge. Marcus (Lionel Boyce) is devastated upon discovering that his mother has died, and Sydney leaves him a message offering her condolences.

One of the establishing shots from "the morning after" shows a Metra train departing Ogilvie Transportation Center. Carmy arrives early to the empty Bear. He cleans up a full ashtray, empty wine glasses, and cloth napkins discarded on one table, rearranges the tables, puts place settings and candles on every table, uses the existing massive bouquets to fill bud vases with what looks like peach ranunculus and golden wattle, and kicks the bar cart and metal ice bucket across the dining room. Synthesizing his past work experiences, he prepares a brand new set of courses for the menu and creates a list of "non-negotiables" for the restaurant to follow, so that it can perform at the highest of standards.

== Production ==
=== Development ===
In May 2024, Hulu confirmed that the first episode of the season would be titled "Tomorrow", and was to be written by series creator Christopher Storer from a story he co-wrote with cast member Matty Matheson, and directed by Storer. It was Storer's eighth writing credit, Matheson's first writing credit, and Storer's 13th directing credit.

=== Casting ===
Chef Dave Beran, who trained Jeremy Allen White and Will Poulter at Pasjoli in Santa Monica, California, as part of the show's pre-production culinary training for actors, appears as chef de partie in Chef Terry's kitchen. Famous chefs guest star as themselves, mentoring the Carmy in-universe: "Boulud teaches Carmy how to prepare one of his most famous dishes, while [René] Redzepi gives Carmy a nod across the room."

=== Writing ===
Matty Matheson contributed to the story of this episode, telling a press pool reporter, "I think a lot of people that have had amazing careers...have worked under a lot of chefs. There's little pieces that you grab onto throughout your life, and that's how and what makes you who you are, the good and the bad. In culinary school, I had this chef that told us this story about how 30 chefs made who he was and told me this story about working under all of these chefs all over Europe and working with chefs and cooks and just learning all of these different trades...Picking up these little skills along the way—and you never stop learning—is who you are made of, you know? The people around you. We wanted to tell a story of...how Carmy was built."

On the episode's structure, Jeremy Allen White said, "It felt very fresh and new. It felt very exciting in its structure and style. It felt different, while also being very much at the heart of the same tone as the show." Regarding the conversation between Carmy and Sugar, White explained, "So often and so frequently, Sugar does this beautiful thing where she's really reaching out to Carmy. And he feels incapable of reaching back or being like, accepting in some kind of way. I think for that scene, for Carm, he just felt like he had to go, there was nothing left for him in this place anymore."

=== Filming ===
Jeremy Allen White filmed scenes at the French Laundry in Yountville, California, United States, and at Noma in Copenhagen, Denmark, during the last week of May 2024. White also filmed at Restaurant Daniel in New York City with Daniel Boulud, who taught Carmy how to prepare Boulud's "signature crispy paupiettes of sea bass dish." Boulud posted on Facebook about the experience, writing, "Filming at Restaurant Daniel for the season-three premiere was done entirely au naturel—no retakes, no gimmicks. The experience was as raw and real as it gets. Jeremy Allen White's incredible talent shines through as he dives in with a perfect blend of fearlessness and confidence. A truly remarkable experience!...Cooking with Jeremy was like cooking with my young chefs. He is a great cook, fast learner, and extremely focused."

According to cinematographer Andrew Wehde in an interview with Panavision:

"Because ['Tomorrow'] wasn't a dialogue-based episode, so much of it was us going into spaces and just shooting. It was a very small, intimate team: me, operator Gary Malouf, and 1st AC Matt Rozek. I control the look, Gary controls the way it's moved, and Matt controls what's in focus...Gaffer Jeremy Long and key grip David Wagenaar were obviously part of that situation, along with some other help. We would roll into The French Laundry or wherever, and we were harnessing what these places already are, finding the most beautiful way of capturing them. The episode lives on three lenses: the H Series 28mm, 35mm, and 55mm. We needed the audience to go on this journey with Carmy in all these places, and what we captured came from the power of light and the power of these three lenses. I use no filters. The lenses are so powerful that if I added any filtration, it would only change the natural beauty of what the lenses are doing. The portrait work on our show has this sharp, crisp focus on a singular spot, whether it's Jeremy's eyes or a piece of the food. But the organic, natural falloff around them doesn't feel like a portrait that you would normally see on a 75mm or a 135mm. It has this dreamy quality to it, and it never feels harsh. We always talk about the fact that the most beautiful cookbooks around the world have their food photographed in a way that's soft and bloomy, and it makes you love what you’re looking at versus making it something sterile...The biggest difference between episode one and the rest of season three is that episode one is shot to feel large-format. We shot it as wide open as possible to give us that isolation of Carmy, because that dude is in his own world. We wanted everything to be focused just on him."

=== Sound recording ===
According to Scott D. Smith, a career sound mixer and head of The Bear's audio recording team since the pilot episode, the real Ever restaurant, which is the setting for several flashback scenes in "Tomorrow," has remarkable sound baffling. He wrote in an article for a film-industry journal in 2025, "This restaurant incorporates some of the best sound treatment I've ever encountered for a front-of-house dining area. With absolutely nothing that would clue the average diner as to how the room was treated, I had to look very carefully at the walls and ceiling areas to figure out how the architect and builders had treated the surfaces. At the end, I remarked to Chef Duffy, 'I would eat here based on the acoustics alone, even if the food was terrible.' I wish every location where we shoot could be as good as that one."

=== Film editing ===
Editor Joanna Naugle said in an interview with Immersive Media that the episode is ruminative and repetitive by design:

"It's playing on the idea that these are memories for the characters, but also memories for the audience. They also experienced this in a different time. I think that repetition of reusing footage is so great, and 301 especially is so much repetition...I'm kind of not sure where [Carmy] mind is [after the events of the season-two finale], so I loved having 301 be a place to get meditative with him. He's cycling through all these different times in his life. Anybody who is creative or has a creative pursuit has thought about, what are all the little things that made me the artist I am or the person I am? It's the people who didn't believe in me. It's people who did believe in me. It's the family members who pushed me away. It's the family members who supported me."

=== Music ===
The entire episode is set to the same single piece of music, "Together", composed by Trent Reznor and Atticus Ross for their 2020 Nine Inch Nails album, Ghosts V: Together. Range magazine commented "The track's ethereal, dreamy cadence deepens the episode's construct as a stream of consciousness, feeding off the negative, liminal spaces that define Carmy's daily grind." A different track from Ghosts V looped throughout the episode immediately prior, "The Bear."

== Release ==
The episode, along with the rest of the season, premiered on June 26, 2024.

== Reception ==
=== Critical reviews ===
Alan Sepinwall of Rolling Stone wrote, "The premiere, 'Tomorrow' is the sort of thing that only a show this beloved can get away with. Though it offers us glimpses of Carmy and the others in the immediate aftermath of the soft opening, it's less interested in its eponymous day than in all of Carmy Berzatto's yesterdays. [...] There's dialogue here and there, but the whole thing is essentially a tone poem, working to put us inside our hero's head even more than usual. [...] It's a lovely table-setter for the season."

Marah Eakin of Vulture gave the episode a 4 star out of 5 rating and wrote, "Carmy can't control all that no matter how hard he tries, even after countless tough hours spent working in kitchens worldwide. However, if we know anything about The Bear, none of that will preclude Carmy from putting immense pressure on himself to somehow circumvent it anyway." Matt Singer of Screen Crush wrote, "Though not the most conventionally satisfying episode of The Bear, I wondered whether 'Tomorrow' was meant to suggest Season 3 as a whole will be structured like one long tasting menu. In which case this episode could be seen as the equivalent of a chef preparing for work by gathering their ingredients. With that out of the way, they can now start to turn up the heat."

A.J. Daulerio of Decider wrote, "Filled with quiet walks, gentle plant tending, cozy houseboats, sparkling workstations, and inspirational dough rolling by a stoic pastry chef named Luca, this episode proved that the characters (and the audience) are allowed to breathe every once in a while." Josh Rosenberg of Esquire wrote, "The Bear is still asking which part of the artistic process brings happiness: the work or the reward? Is it selfish to want to enjoy the experience, too, or is it that self-centeredness that drives you to put blinders on in the pursuit of glory? I can't promise that Carm will find an answer by the end of season 3."

In a less positive review, Jenna Scherer of The A.V. Club gave the episode a "B–" grade and wrote, "'Tomorrow' itself is an odd dish, combining ingredients that don't quite go together. Though it sometimes feels like a dreamy (and nightmarish) journey through Carmy's psyche, it often lands with all the artfulness of a clip show, making what should be a stage-setting season premiere feel like a filler episode. Maybe Storer could stand to take his own advice: subtract."

Kevin Fallon of The Daily Beast argued that the mood shift was, if nothing else, ambitious: "Given the bedlam The Bear is known for, launching Season 3 with a poignant, montage-filled tone poem is a ballsy swerve...to launch a new season in such a manner, with a depressive, hyper-emotional lilt, is a fascinating way for a series to meet a moment of so much hype and anticipation." Inverse's Alex Welch described it as the "best and most stylistically invigorating flashback episode in TV history...set to one monorhythmic piece of music...in just 35 minutes, it clears the table for what's to come, offers us a deeper look at what's come before, and sets up the themes of guilt, regret, and cyclical abuse that hang heavy over the entirety of The Bear season 3."

ScreenCrush described it as an "episode-long jumble of flashbacks with no evident story arc and no major character developments...viewed on its own, 'Tomorrow' reminds the audience that The Bear is as much a show about a restaurant and its screwed-up staff as it is about artists and their art. Episodes like this one emphasize where creative inspiration comes from, and how a creator's work is inextricably linked to their life and their experiences. Its show-long flashback was probably a long time coming for Carmy, who has been pushing away all of these thoughts for a long time. Painful as it is for him to do it (and maybe as painful as it is for some in the audience to watch him do it) the process allows him to get to the root of some huge questions: Namely 'Why am I doing this?' and maybe even more importantly 'What do I want to say by doing it?'"

=== Accolades ===
Award	Category	Nominee	Result	Ref.
ACE Eddie Awards	Best Edited Single-Camera Comedy Series	Joanna Naugle	Nominated	
Directors Guild of America Awards	Outstanding Directorial Achievement in Comedy Series	Christopher Storer	Nominated	
Primetime Emmy Awards	Outstanding Lead Actor in a Comedy Series	Jeremy Allen White	Nominated	
Primetime Creative Arts Emmy Awards	Outstanding Single-Camera Picture Editing for a Comedy Series	Joanna Naugle	Nominated	

== Sources ==
- Smith, Scott D. (Fall 2025). "The Bear: The Challenges of Managing Kitchen Chaos". Production Sound & Video. 17 (4). North Hollywood, California: IATSE 695: 32–37.
