= 78th Directors Guild of America Awards =

- Date: February 7, 2026
- Location: The Beverly Hilton, Beverly Hills, California
- Country: United States
- Presented by: Directors Guild of America
- Hosted by: Kumail Nanjiani

Highlights
- Best Director Feature Film: One Battle After Another – Paul Thomas Anderson
- Best Director Documentary: 2000 Meters to Andriivka – Mstyslav Chernov
- Best Director First-Time Feature Film: The Plague – Charlie Polinger

The 78th Directors Guild of America Awards, honoring the outstanding directorial achievement in feature films, documentary, television and commercials of 2025, were presented on February 7, 2026, at the Beverly Hilton in Beverly Hills, California. The ceremony was hosted by Kumail Nanjiani. The nominations for the television and documentary categories were announced on January 7, 2026, while the nominations for the feature film categories were announced on January 8, 2026.

== Winners and nominees ==
=== Film ===
Feature Film

Paul Thomas Anderson – One Battle After Another

- Ryan Coogler – Sinners
- Guillermo del Toro – Frankenstein
- Josh Safdie – Marty Supreme
- Chloé Zhao – Hamnet
Documentary Film

Mstyslav Chernov – 2000 Meters to Andriivka

- Geeta Gandbhir – The Perfect Neighbor
- Sara Khaki and Mohammadreza Eyni – Cutting Through Rocks
- Elizabeth Lo – Mistress Dispeller
- Laura Poitras and Mark Obenhaus – Cover-Up
First-Time Feature Film

Charlie Polinger – The Plague

- Hasan Hadi – The President's Cake
- Harry Lighton – Pillion
- Alex Russell – Lurker
- Eva Victor – Sorry, Baby

=== Television ===
Drama Series

Amanda Marsalis – The Pitt for "6:00 P.M." (HBO Max)

- Liza Johnson – The Diplomat for "Amagansett" (Netflix)
- Janus Metz Pedersen – Andor for "Who Are You?" (Disney+)
- Ben Stiller – Severance for "Cold Harbor" (Apple TV)
- John Wells – The Pitt for "7:00 A.M." (HBO Max)
Comedy Series

Seth Rogen and Evan Goldberg – The Studio for "The Oner" (Apple TV)

- Lucia Aniello – Hacks for "A Slippery Slope" (HBO Max)
- Janicza Bravo – The Bear for "Worms" (FX)
- Christopher Storer – The Bear for "Bears" (FX)
- Mike White – The White Lotus for "Denials" (HBO)
Limited and Anthology Series

Shannon Murphy – Dying for Sex for "It's Not That Serious" (FX)

- Jason Bateman – Black Rabbit for "The Black Rabbits" (Netflix)
- Antonio Campos – The Beast in Me for "Sick Puppy" (Netflix)
- Lesli Linka Glatter – Zero Day for "Episode 6" (Netflix)
- Ally Pankiw – Black Mirror for "Common People" (Netflix)
Movies for Television

Stephen Chbosky – Nonnas (Netflix)

- Jesse Armstrong – Mountainhead (HBO)
- Scott Derrickson – The Gorge (Apple TV)
- Michael Morris – Bridget Jones: Mad About the Boy (Peacock)
- Kyle Newacheck – Happy Gilmore 2 (Netflix)
Variety

Liz Patrick – SNL50: The Anniversary Special (NBC)

- Yvonne De Mare – The Late Show with Stephen Colbert for "Julia Roberts; Sam Smith" (CBS)
- Andy Fisher – Jimmy Kimmel Live! for "Stephen Colbert; Kumail Nanjiani; Reneé Rapp" (ABC)
- Beth McCarthy-Miller – SNL50: The Homecoming Concert (Peacock)
- Paul Pennolino – Last Week Tonight with John Oliver for "Public Media" (HBO)
Sports

Matthew Gangl – 2025 World Series – Game 7 (Fox)

- Steve Milton – 2025 Masters Tournament (CBS)
- Rich Russo – Super Bowl LIX (Fox)
Reality / Quiz & Game

Mike Sweeney – Conan O'Brien Must Go for "Austria" (HBO Max)

- Lucinda M. Margolis – Jeopardy! for "Ep. 9341" (Syndicated)
- Adam Sandler – The Price Is Right for "10,000th Episode" (CBS)
Documentary Series / News

Rebecca Miller – Mr. Scorsese for "All This Filming Isn't Healthy" (Apple TV)

- Marshall Curry – SNL50: Beyond Saturday Night for "Written By: A Week Inside the SNL Writers Room" (Peacock)
- Susan Lacy and Jessica Levin – Billy Joel: And So It Goes for "Part Two" (HBO)
- Alex Stapleton – Sean Combs: The Reckoning for "Official Girl" (Netflix)
- Matt Wolf – Pee-wee as Himself for "Part 1" (HBO)

=== Commercials ===
Commercials

Kim Gehrig – Nike's "You Can't Win. So Win." and Apple's "I'm Not Remarkable"

- Miles Jay – ChatGPT's "Dish", "Pull Up", and "Trip", and Meta's "Home for the Holidays" and "Secret Santa"
- Spike Jonze – Apple's "Someday"
- Andreas Nilsson – Andrex' "Conquer the First School Poo", Apple's "Garrett" and "Big Flex", and Virgin Media's "Trunk Trucker"
- Steve Rogers – Amazon's "Bring a Book to Life", Squarespace's "A Tale as Old as Websites", and Coinbase's "Everything is Fine"

=== Frank Capra Achievement Award ===
- Gregory G. McCollum

=== Franklin J. Schaffner Achievement Award ===
- David Charles
