= Courtney Storer =

American chef and culinary producer

Courtney "Coco" Storer (b. c. 1984) is an American chef and co-executive producer and culinary producer for the American TV show The Bear. According to Food & Wine magazine, "chocolate cake, sandwiches, and cannolis are an essential part of the show's storytelling."

== Biography ==
Storer was born around 1984, and grew up in the north suburbs of Chicago, Illinois, United States, in a family that included her older brother, the creator of The Bear, writer-director Christopher Storer. She started working in restaurants before she was legally eligible to work and was employed at a series of Italian-American-family-owned restaurants in the Chicago area. She graduated from college and worked corporate jobs at UPS and Whole Foods, working at restaurants on the weekend. She went to culinary school at International Culinary Center in Campbell, California. She then flew to Paris on a one-way ticket (all she could afford) and planted herself on the steps of a restaurant called Verjus; her first words to the chef were "in French, like, 'Désolée. My French is terrible.'" Storer says they initially let her hang around because she was good at cleaning and had a positive attitude. After cooking in Paris she came to visit her brother in Los Angeles and staged at Trois Mec before getting hired to cook at Animal and then Jon & Vinny's, both run by Vinny Dotolo and Jon Shook. She worked at Jon & Vinny's for seven years, and then as a caterer and private chef. Her catering company is called Coco's To Go.

When The Bear started production she began training the actors and advising set decoration and camera on how a working kitchen would look and feel. When building out the Bear restaurant set in season two, Storer insisted that it be a fully functional working kitchen so "outfitted with working gas stovetops and professional ovens so the cast can react to real heat and all its effects: They feel hot and sweaty and can smell onions caramelizing (or burning) or a sauce boiling over."

As culinary producer she coordinates necessary props and set decor, as well as sourcing ingredients, creating recipes for the Bear menu, and mise en place for the actors doing an on-camera cook. Her culinary production team includes culinary co-producer C. J. Capace, chefs Brian Lockwood and Justin Selk, Nicole Biyani, Danielle Stefanick, and Gabriel Wallace and Jeffrey Thomas in the dish room. The team creates a culinary reference guide for every episode, in part because "The show itself is tracking a Michelin-level restaurant, which is, you know, very precise in how they set things up and also the tools that they use over things that they don't." Storer told Vanity Fair magazine in 2023 that the role of a culinary producer exists because "the responsibilities are more expansive than just food styling or managing the food. Much of the job is being a producer, being able to utilize the chef community and bring people on board to assist and create the right vibe. It's such a team that creates The Bear. I felt like a facilitator. There was just a lot of direction I was able to provide...so it evolved into this more of a producer role."

Storer and Michelin star-winning Kasama chef Tim Flores worked together at GT Fish & Oyster in younger days and reunited to create the "seven fishes" for the Friends & Family soft launch of the fictional Bear restaurant. Storer designed the savory "Mikey" cannoli of season two. All the food on the show is real, and edible. Jon Bernthal, who plays the late lamented Mikey Berzatto in flashbacks, is apparently prone to snacking on the set decoration. Storer joked about Bernthal and Jamie Lee Curtis eating meatballs on the set of "Fishes": "Thank God I made them so good."

Storer lives in Los Angeles. During the January 2025 Southern California wildfires she started cooking for "first responders hungry after long, demanding shifts; there were people sleeping in shelters, in their cars, or on the street; there were others bouncing among hotels and Airbnbs and the couches of friends and family" in her garage catering kitchen and then recruited dozens of friends and connected with José Andrés' disaster-experienced World Central Kitchen before moving the ever-expanding operation into the kitchen of a lesbian wine bar located in a strip mall.

Storer takes credit for the prevalence of "yes chef" on The Bear. She told People in 2022 that it promotes camaraderie and uplift in the kitchen: "The reason that I think it's helpful is it's non-binary. Anyone can be called chef. Everybody's job is integral. So, 'yes chef' is kind of stating everybody's important. You're just as important as I am."

Courtney Storer has a dog named Bear.

== See also ==
- Food of The Bear
- List of The Bear characters
