= Hill House Home =

American clothing company

- Company type: Private
- Industry: Online clothing
- Founded: 2016; 9 years ago in New York City, U.S.
- Founder: Nell Diamond
- Headquarters: New York, U.S.
- Number of employees: 50 (2024)
- Website: hillhousehome.com

Hill House Home is a direct-to-consumer clothing company founded in 2016 by Nell Diamond. Initially focussed on linens and bedding, the company found success with its signature style of nap dress which it introduced in 2019. The dress, described as an elevated nightgown by the New York Times, was particularly popular during the COVID-19 pandemic. Wearers shared photos on social media using the hashtag #napdressnation.

In 2023 it expanded from the US to the UK, opening a warehouse in Essex.
