= Paulie James =

American restaurateur and actor

Paulie James is an American cook and restaurateur who owns four sandwich shops in California and Nevada. James was born in Queens, New York, and grew up in Flushing. He owns Uncle Paulie's Deli, founded in 2017 in partnership with Jon Buscemi. The chain has locations in Las Vegas, and Los Angeles (Studio City, Fairfax, and Echo Park). James lives in Los Angeles.

== Acting ==
James guest stars on The Bear TV series as Charles D. "Chuckie" Valentino, a neighborhood guy who has worked on and off at the Beef sandwich shop for many years. James frequently shares scenes with veteran theater actor Edwin Lee Gibson, who plays Ebra. Gibson said of acting with the chef, "...Paulie, he's just Paulie. Sometimes actors don't like to work with people that are not actors, and I'm like, 'Nah.' My job is to silently steer the ship. That's what the actor in me knows they have to do with someone who is more of a novice."

== See also ==
- Christopher Zucchero
