= Adam Shapiro (actor) =

American actor

Adam Shapiro is an American actor and entrepreneur.

Shapiro was raised in Abington, Pennsylvania, a suburb of Philadelphia, and studied government and politics at the University of Maryland. He appeared in over 100 commercials early in his career.

He had a small role in The Good Lord Bird, the Showtime miniseries about John Brown. He played a teacher, Mr. Shapiro, on the series Never Have I Ever. He plays the recurring role of Adam Shapiro, chef de cuisine at the fictionalized Ever restaurant, on seasons two, three, and four of the TV series The Bear.

Shapiro co-owns Shappy Pretzel Co., which manufactures and markets soft pretzels like those preferred in his native Philadelphia.

He married actress Katie Lowes in 2012 and they have two children together.
