= Natalie Berzatto =

Fictional character, The Bear TV series

- The Bear character
- Abby Elliott as Natalie in season 2
- First appearance: "System"; June 23, 2022
- Last appearance: "The Original Beef of Chicagoland"; June 25, 2026
- Created by: Christopher Storer
- Portrayed by: Abby Elliott

In-universe information
- Full name: Natalie Rose Berzatto
- Nicknames: Nat; Sugar; Sug; Sugie; Sugarbear; Bear; Chef; Mom
- Occupation: Business manager
- Family: Donna Berzatto (mother); Michael Berzatto (brother, deceased); Carmen Berzatto (brother)
- Spouse: Pete Katinsky (husband)
- Children: Sophie Katinsky
- Date of birth: November 10, 1988

Natalie Rose Berzatto, also known as Sugar or Nat, is a fictional character on the FX Network television series The Bear. Created by Christopher Storer and played by Abby Elliott, Natalie is a former bank executive turned restaurant business manager. A reluctant investor in her family's dingy, old-school Italian beef sandwich joint, the Original Beef of Chicagoland, she despised the restaurant when it was run by her older brother Mikey. After Mikey's suicide, her younger brother, acclaimed chef Carmy Berzatto, moved home to Chicago to take over the restaurant. Carmy's partner, Chef Sydney, persuaded Natalie to serve as business manager for a new fine dining restaurant to be called the Bear. Elliott was nominated for a Golden Globe Award for Best Supporting Actress for her performance.

== Casting ==
Storer knew Elliott from her "affectionate" celebrity impersonations on Saturday Night Live, and thought her sketch comedy and improv background would be well-suited for his style as a director and producer. Elliott said in 2024 that the subtext built into Storer's scripts was a new element of acting for her: "My career has been all text...I've done things where I'm explaining exactly how I'm feeling, like so many times."

== Biography ==
Natalie was born November 10, 1988. Nat, Carmy (Jeremy Allen White), and Mikey Berzatto (Jon Bernthal) were primarily raised by their alcoholic, mentally ill mother, Donna (Jaime Lee Curtis). The first name of the father of the Berzatto kids is unknown; he abandoned the family "probably sometime in the 1990s." Uncle Jimmy (Oliver Platt), who was his best friend, last talked to Mr. Berzatto "about 20 years ago" (from 2022). According to Elliott, Natalie's role as the only girl pushed her to take a caretaker role in regard to her demented mother, often to Nat's own detriment. Donna appears to pick on Natalie especially, intermittently dishing out ferocious verbal abuse. Compared to Donna and Mikey, Nat and Carm share an inclination to mediate rather than instigate, at least within the family dynamic. The New York Times described her as "clearly the only member of their family who has ever been to therapy."

Natalie goes by her birth name outside her family of origin. She has the nurse write "Natalie" in the "call me" slot on the board at the hospital when she is in labor with her daughter in "Ice Chips," and in "Replicants" when she returns to work after maternity leave she firmly tells Rene (and Garrett) to call her Natalie, not the more familiar Sugar. Her nickname "Sugar" is a loving endearment when deployed by her brothers and favored uncles but the original source of the nickname was a childhood mistake that her mother twisted into a decades-long mocking recrimination. Nonetheless, Natalie is fundamentally calm, empathetic, and "sweet-natured," and thus her nickname is apt. Yet, on a show that has been called a "symphony of swearing," Sugar keeps her language profane on pace with her brothers and cousins.

Mikey's suicide launched the events of the series and left surviving family members traumatized and carrying a sense of guilt. Natalie and Carmen have a strained relationship with their mother but "guarded" though she is, Nat ultimately called her mother to her bedside when she went into labor with her baby while her husband was still on a flight home from a business trip. According to Elliott, Sugar's persistent outreach to the avoidant Carmy sometimes reveals her own anxiety about the Berzattos "...like, 'Please don't leave me here with our family...'"

Nat is married to Pete Katinsky (Chris Witaske), a "good-natured," positive, optimistic corporate lawyer. The couple have a healthy and positive relationship, although, according to Witaske, Pete loves Natalie so much that he sometimes cries over her and her family's pain. Witaske said in 2023 that the Berzattos, including Mikey when he was alive, Carmy, Richie (Ebon Moss-Bachrach), and Uncle Jimmy (Oliver Platt) "clearly view him as an outsider, or someone who wasn't grown in the same soil of generational trauma that they were. I assume that Pete probably grew up in the suburbs and is a business guy, and so it's easy for them to paint him as this loser." Pete is a college graduate (with an advanced degree), unlike Natalie's brothers and Richie. Pete is bullied by Nat's family when he first joins the clan. By the end of the season one episode "Sheridan," Carmy confesses that he is warming up to Pete. However, Carmy still has Pete listed in his phone under his original name of "Sugar's boyfriend (Pete?)". Nat and Pete's first child together is a daughter named Sophie Katinsky. Nat reveals her pregnancy early in season two, and gives birth the season three episode "Ice Chips," and then takes maternity leave before returning to work at the restaurant in the season four episode "Replicants." Nat and Pete are "blissful" after the arrival of Sophie, and embraces a major life change for Carmen regardless of the potential consequences for the restaurant.

Nat and Carmy are very close; according to Elliott, "She's really good at her job [at the restaurant]. But I think she got into it because she loves Carmy so much and just wanted to take care of him." This abiding affection is repeatedly shown to be long-standing, for instance, a years-ago flashback in season three depicts Natalie "functioning as a support system for Carmy...She sees him off to his new life as a chef in New York and offers him a little bit of cash to get started." Nonetheless, focusing on Carmy is at least mildly avoidant because it allows Natalie to play "fixer" and partially sidestep her own trauma. In addition to encouraging her brother to attend Al-Anon meetings to help him process the trauma of their childhood and their brother's suicide, Nat steers the "logistical and financial" side of the Beef-to-Bear launch. Sugar has a "Type A, detail-oriented personality" that serves as a useful counterweight to her chef brother's chaotic creative genius and inability to do basic math.

Nat also develops a warm relationship with Sydney Adamu (Ayo Edebiri), who cooks a heavily pregnant Natalie an omelette on the day they're set to "soft open" the Bear. Natalie views Sydney as a leader, while maintaining serious doubts about her brother's capacity to be present at either the restaurant or in their family life.

Natalie also adores Marcus Brooks (Lionel Boyce), who served Mikey as a bread baker and who, with mentoring from Carmy, Sydney, and Luca (Will Poulter), has become an acclaimed pastry chef at the Bear. Sugar threatened to murder financial consultant and her "Uncle" Computer (Brian Koppelman) for suggesting that the restaurant could economize by cutting the dessert menu and Marcus' job. Marcus is also the first person who Sugar lets hold the baby at the restaurant, which Elliott stated is because "Marcus is the gentle one. Marcus is the careful one. He's trustworthy. He's the first that she brings her to."

Natalie also maintains ambivalent friendships with a number of the Fak siblings who grew up in her neighborhood, including "quick-talking merrymakers" Neil (Matty Matheson) and Ted (Ricky Staffieri), and their foxy, sophisticated sister Francine "Francie" Fak (Brie Larson). Francie and Nat once had a romantic relationship; it ended badly. The Faks and Richie refer to Nat as "Mom" because Nat is a figure of comparative maturity and authority. Nat seemingly reaches the limits of her patience with the Faks when it comes to her infant daughter; "the two main morons sniff around baby Sophie like a couple of sweaty moron hyenas" but they are forbidden from holding the baby. Meanwhile, Luca is promptly granted full baby-cuddling rights.

The Berzattos are Italian American by heritage. Unlike older brother Mikey, Sugar has "no stereotypically Italian-American features." The family has a Roman Catholic religious background. The family celebrates the Feast of the Seven Fishes; Natalie and her brothers sometimes make a ritual appeal to Our Mother of Victory, an embodiment of the Virgin Mary.

In "Ice Chips," Sugar is seen driving a Porsche Cayenne. According to costume designer Courtney Wheeler, over the course of the series, her outfits transition from soft fabrics and pastels to "jewel tones and stronger work silhouettes" while still drawing on "textures Natalie loved, such as tweed and bouclé. In an interview with Decider about season 5, Elliott stated that one character detail did not make the final cut of her outdoor sex scene: "We had a lower back tattoo for Sugar. It was a dolphin with a design around it that she got in probably 2007...[It] goes back to Season 1 [when I was] talking to costumes. I'm like, 'Sugar's grown up in Chicago, so maybe really fantasized about the ocean her whole life. And maybe she's kind of obsessed with dolphins.' In Season 1 you'll notice I'm wearing a dolphin necklace. So we called it back."

== See also ==
- List of The Bear characters

== Sources ==
- Grazia Serra, Alessandra Olga (May 2024). "The Bear: New (stereotypical) representations of Italian Americans in contemporary television series". Forum Italicum: A Journal of Italian Studies. 58 (1): 114–124. doi:10.1177/00145858231223974. ISSN 0014-5858.
