= Andrew Lopez =

American television actor

- Education: Iowa State University (2012)
- Occupations: Actor; comedian; writer
- Known for: Platonic; The Bear

Andrew Lopez is an American television actor. He has guest starred as Garrett, a "no nonsense" back-of-house restaurant worker, on seasons two through five of The Bear. Lopez's character on The Bear is typically grouped with Sarah Ramos' Chef Jess and Rene Gube's Rene. He also costarred in the Apple TV series Platonic. In May 2025, he was cast in an Amazon Studios comedy called Judgment Day. Originally from Pella, Iowa, he attended Iowa State University. Lopez has Korean and Filipino heritage.
