= Tiffany Jerimovich =

Fictional character, The Bear TV series

- The Bear character
- Gillian Jacobs as Tiff in "Bears"
- First appearance: "Braciole"; June 23, 2022
- Last appearance: "The Original Beef of Chicagoland"; June 25, 2026
- Created by: Christopher Storer
- Portrayed by: Gillian Jacobs

In-universe information
- Full name: Tiffany Jerimovich
- Nickname: Tiff
- Occupation: Unknown (but probably schoolteacher)
- Spouses: Frank (husband); Richie Jerimovich (divorced)
- Children: Eva Jerimovich

Tiffany Jerimovich is a fictional character on the FX Network television series The Bear. Tiff was created by Christopher Storer and played by Gillian Jacobs. She is the ex-wife of Richie Jerimovich (Ebon Moss-Bachrach), and the mom of his daughter Evie. Jacobs first played Tiff in an uncredited voice role (voicemail outgoing message) in "Braciole", and first appeared onscreen in the Christmas flashback "Fishes." She reprised her role in the following seasons and in the special, "Gary".

== Biography ==
Tiffany is Richie's ex-wife and the mother of Evie. When she was young she worked as a babysitter, taking care of kids including Claire, and photos of Claire and Tiff as adult friends appear scattered on the table in the restaurant basement with other family nostalgia in the season two episode "Beef." Tiff's current job involves working with children, Frank implies that she is a schoolteacher like his parents had been. As of the season-three episode "Apologies" she reported that "[the] kids are still kind of fucked up from COVID." A key Richie-Tiff plot point in the flashback episode "Fishes" is that she wants to move to a house in a neighborhood with good schools; Richie lied to Tiff that Jimmy had offered him a job, which gave Tiff hope of a turnaround in their household finances that would allow such a move. Jimmy had little to no interest in employing Richie but chose not to reveal Richie's dishonesty to pregnant Tiffany at the Christmas Eve dinner table. In "Gary," Tiffany is very pregnant with Evie and initially very supportive of Richie's planned road trip with his friend, but her level of concern, expressed in a series of calls between the spouses, begins to increase over the course of the day.

Tiffany and Richie divorced sometime prior to the beginning of the series. As depicted in "Tomorrow," Ted Fak was escorting Tiff at Mikey's funeral, so Tiff and Richie were probably already estranged by the time of Michael Berzatto's death. Gillian Jacobs, who plays Tiff, told The Hollywood Reporter in 2024, "I do feel like she ended it, but I don't know what her breaking point was." The same year she speculated to Bustle.com, "He had a very intense relationship with Michael, and that really dominated his life in a lot of ways. And I wonder if she felt second to that at some point." Richie was still paying divorce-related bills in season 1. In season 2, Richie started hearing stories about "Uncle Frank" from Evie, and then Tiffany told Richie she was engaged to be married to another man. Tiff and Richie remain devoted co-parents Evie, which keeps them connected, said Jacobs in 2025: "There's always a connection there. She's engaged, which is not easy for Richie. But they treat each other with a lot of love and kindness even though there's a lot of sadness and regret there."

In the Richie-centric "Forks" episode, Tiff calls her ex to tell him that her boyfriend Frank proposed and she said yes. Jacobs told a reporter that the emotional moment was enriched by the "presence" of her scene partner: "I did get to do the scene with him. That helped enormously. A lot of times when you're doing those scenes, the other person isn't on the other end of the phone and the script supervisor or the director or the first AD is reading it with you...I was very lucky that Ebon was on the other side of the phone call. So, it wasn't nearly as difficult as it could have been because I got to act with him." The pair also share a scene in "Apologies" in season 3, as they watch their daughter play at the park, while "Secret Love" by Stevie Nicks plays on the soundtrack. Jacobs said of their exchange at the playground that, "We haven't become best friends again after divorce. We're very connected because of our child, and we're clearly spending time together with each other. But it is also like he symbolizes family and connection and all of these things to her. Going into this new marriage, not feeling like she has a lot of family, it's like am I bringing anything of my previous life with me, or is it all going to now go away, and I don't want it to." Moss-Bachrach told NPR in 2025, "I do think there's a lot of tenderness there, and she genuinely loves him. Do we learn more about what happened with them? We spend more time with them together as parents, as exes. In terms of, like, a literal sense of, like, a flashback of the two of them, that's not something that we've shot...I spent a lot of time kind of daydreaming and thinking about [their relationship and how and why they broke up] and filling in the blanks. And these are thoughts and fantasies and ideas that I will never share."

Tiff got remarried in the season 4 episode "Bears," to Frank (Josh Hartnett), which caused her to reveal her fears of being cut loose from the clan but at the wedding she and Carmy agreed that they remain "cousins," and Uncle Jimmy reassured her that she is a Bear forever. Jacobs said in 2024, "In my mind, she's very good friends with Sugar. I love Abby [Elliott]. We were in this indie movie called Life Partners years ago, so I feel that ease and connection [with her]. We have a tiny moment in 'Fishes' in the kitchen where I'm leaving, she comes in. She's like, You good? I'm like, No. That, to me, is emblematic of a great friendship." Tiff's biological family is just as messy as the Berzattos and she has little contact with them. At the time of Tiff's wedding her biological mom was in Boulder, Colorado, with "a guy."

== Costume design ==
Courtney Wheeler said that "Tiff’s borrowed robe and Taylor Swift moment" in "Fishes" was an important costuming project in season 2. For her low-key wedding, Jacobs wore a "custom-designed '60s-style minidress and Roger Vivier Mini Très Mary Janes" that matches with Evie's "apple-print smock dress from Chicago's Festive Collective and hand-painted shoes."

== Reception ==
Awards Daily wrote in 2024, "Among the many guest stars that appear in The Bear and meld into character without creating any distraction to the show, Gillian Jacobs as Richie's ex-wife is one of the most important. Despite appearing sparingly in the show, Tiffany's presence hangs over nearly every decision (good or bad) that Richie makes."

Tara Ariano of Cracked wrote in 2025, "Part of the reason I find Claire so frustrating to watch is that she's the flatter version of Tiff. It probably helps that by the time the events of the show start, Tiff and Richie have already broken up, so we don't have to watch her weeping over a man who is often annoying, or worse...The Tiff of season 4 is stressed about the wedding, and her estranged mother, but to a recognizably human degree; at the event, when Eva has a very orderly meltdown, Tiff can trust that the men she chose to coparent with will be able to handle it. Her dance with Cicero—in which he assures her that divorcing Richie will never mean she's divorcing the Berzattos—is one of the season's sweetest moments."

== See also ==
- List of The Bear characters
- List of The Bear episodes
- Food of The Bear
- Music on The Bear
- Family on The Bear
- Bibliography of The Bear
