= Mikey Berzatto =

Fictional character, The Bear TV series

- Jon Bernthal as Mikey in of "Braciole"
- First appearance: "Ceres"; June 23, 2022
- Last appearance: "Gary"; May 5, 2026
- Created by: Christopher Storer
- Portrayed by: Jon Bernthal

In-universe information
- Full name: Michael Berzatto
- Nickname: Mikeybear
- Occupation: Entrepreneur, self-employed
- Family: Donna Berzatto (mother); Natalie Berzatto (sister); Carmen Berzatto (brother)

Michael "Mikey" Berzatto is a fictional character on the FX Network television series The Bear. Mikey, played by Jon Bernthal, left a legacy that made possible the construction of the show's found family, not to mention the Bear restaurant itself. Mikey's suicide was the inciting event that led his younger brother Carmy Berzatto (Jeremy Allen White) to move back to Chicago and take over the family's misbegotten Original Beef sandwich shop, putting Carmy at odds with Mikey's best friend, their play cousin and de facto foster brother Richie Jerimovich (Ebon Moss-Bachrach).

Mikey appears in roughly one major flashback in each season (namely, and in order broadcast, "Ceres," "Fishes," "Napkins," "Groundhogs"), and he is a continuing presence in memory, dialogue, photographs, flashback montages, dream sequences, and voiceovers throughout the series, (most notably in "Braciole," "Tomorrow," "Forever," and "The Original Beef of Chicagoland"). Bernthal reprised his role in the flashback special "Gary," set approximately three years before Mikey's suicide, which Bernthal co-wrote with Moss-Bachrach and which aired between seasons four and five.

Bernthal has been nominated for three Emmys and won once for his guest-starring work on The Bear as Mikey Berzatto.

== Casting ==
Ebon Moss-Bachrach is largely responsible for the casting of Jon Bernthal as Mikey Berzatto, the pair having met during the production of an off-Broadway play, Lanford Wilson's Fifth of July, in 2003. Bernthal was understudy for three actors, Moss-Bachrach, David Harbour, and Robert Sean Leonard. The pair later appeared together in season one of The Punisher, a 2017–2019 TV series starring Bernthal as Marvel Comics anti-hero Frank Castle, and the 2022 independent film Sharp Stick. The producers had considered keeping Mikey a mythical figure, described but never appearing onscreen, but Moss-Bachrach thought Bernthal's charisma and sense of humor might be a valuable addition to the tragedy of Michael Berzatto, and "I brought it up to the showrunners. And they were like, 'Oh, yeah, absolutely.' They thought it was a good idea so quickly, that it made me think that maybe they had sort of been wanting [him,] because they kept asking me, 'Is there anyone you know?' And they knew that we were friends. I think maybe they were pushing me a little bit to do it. And then I called Jon."

Following the release of the 2026 special episode "Gary," Bernthal told Decider.com about his journey with the character:

It's been so interesting to play this character one scene at a time over the years. Ebon, you know, first made that phone call and said, 'Hey, man, I'm working on this show and, I don't know, it feels really good. I love these people. It's a really, really healthy set. Would you come over and do this thing for me?' I mean, what a call to get from a friend who you trust so much. And [the role] was this guy that was supposed to be larger than life, and had this magnetic smile, and was an incredible storyteller, and the kind of guy whose loss would have such a huge impact. That's really all I knew. Then becoming a fan of the show and being able to see it from afar, from really another realm, and realizing the impact that this guy has on these unbelievable characters, these unbelievably beautiful performances, and this pristine writing that's going on, and be the best show on television. But to be able to show these other sides. And then this, it's like we've seen his ugliness, we've seen it pop up, we've seen the damage. We've seen the depth of his love, we've seen the depth of his despair.

== Biography ==
Michael Berzatto, called Mikey, was born November 15, 1979, and shot himself in the head on the State Street Bridge on February 22, 2022. He was 42 years old at the time of his suicide. The loud, lionized, charismatic, and larger-than-life oldest brother of the family, Mikey was first described by Uncle Jimmy in the second episode of the series: "No disrespect...your brother, he was an animal, surrounded by dickheads, and then he lost his mind, and now he put you in a real tough spot." In the season 1 finale, "Braciole," his best friend Richie reflected on Mikey's suicide and described him as "...so loud and obnoxious and fսckin' hilarious. You know, he was Mikey Bear. I thought...he would pull out of it." In the pilot, Fak told Marcus about Michael, "Dude, he was like one of my best friends, but then fuckin' it got dark at the end..." In his Al-Anon monologue, Carmy described him as loud, hilarious, and everyone's best friend because "he had this amazing ability. He could just, he could walk into a room, and he could take the temperature of it instantly. You know, he could just, he could dial it." In season 2 "Honeydew," Marcus tells Luca (Will Poulter) that the owner of the Beef hired him in approximately fall 2021: "He was really tight, but also really out of his fuckin' mind. And he wanted to open a bakery."

He seems "kind of dumb," but he's also the man who "turned the Original Beef of Chicagoland into something that mattered to a group of misfits." He served as a father figure to his much younger brother: "Lacking a biological dad to look up to, the shy, young Carmy finds a lifeline in his older brother, who charms him into developing a love for cooking." Mikey's rejection of Carmy led Carmy to leave Chicago to become a professional chef in an attempt to work toward his big brother's acceptance. Unbeknownst to Carmy, Mikey was intentionally pushing Carmy away from the family to protect him from their destructive habits and chaos. In an interview with Variety following the release of season 2, Bernthal commented:

I think the stuff that we don't know is almost as interesting as the stuff that we do...I only know bits of information and we know, obviously, what Mikey's fate is. Oftentimes, when we really love people and we're aware of our own toxicity, our own hopelessness, and him being in the state that he's in...he feels like this shop and the way that he's run it and everything around him has been this enormous albatross, and he's kind of run into the ground. He's shrouded in hopelessness, and he wants to keep his brother out of it. He wants to keep his brother pure. That might manifest itself sometimes in jealousy and anger.

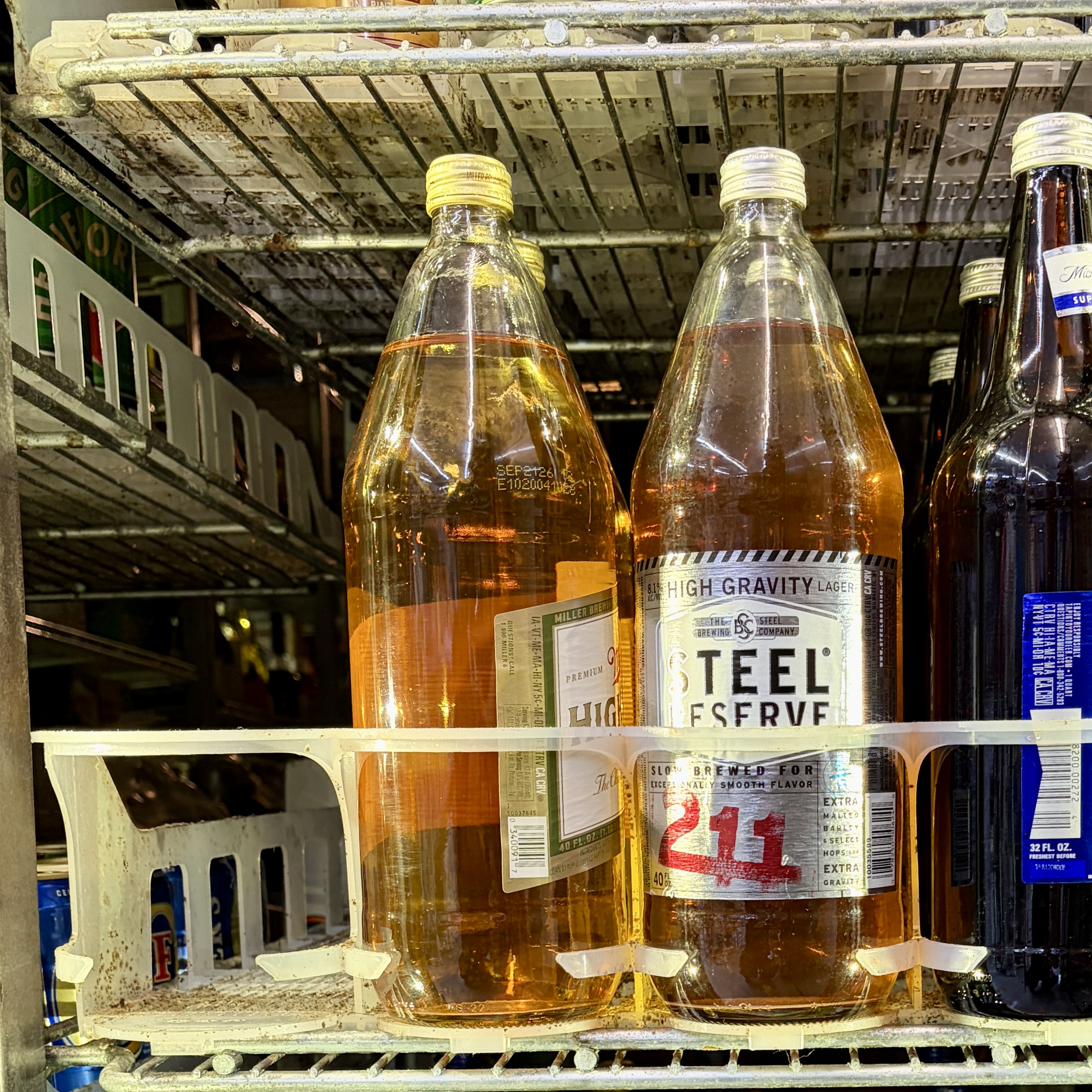
40s of lager and malt liquor; the "Gary" soundtrack includes Wilbert Harrison's 12-bar blues song "Kansas City," which lyrics speak of visiting "my Kansas City baby" with a "bottle of Kansas City wine"

Following in his mother's footsteps as an addict, Mikey drank to excess, got high, and was dependent on painkillers, which is part of why Carmy, sister Natalie (Abby Elliott), and brother-in-law Pete (Chris Witaske) now attend Al-Anon support group meetings. As we learn in season 1, Mikey "apparently liked to drink and party and get into a good bit of trouble with Richie around Chicago." It is implied that Mikey encouraged his best friend and all-purpose deputy Richie to deal small amounts of cocaine out of the back of the restaurant to sustain the business during the COVID-19 pandemic. Exactly what kind of "painkillers" Mike used has not been specified, but his addiction "slowly killed him and fractured his relationships within an already damaged family." By the end of "Gary," he is loaded with alcohol, cocaine, marijuana, and maybe the prescription drugs kept in his glove compartment. Richie asks at the store if they have tallboys, which are 16 U.S. fl oz (470 ml) beers in aluminum cans. They end up drinking 40s, which are 40 U.S. fl oz (1200 ml) glass bottles, often containing malt liquor. An ale or a lager beer typically has a little more than five percent alcohol by volume whereas malt liquor (despite the name, not a distilled beverage) generally has an alcohol content of seven percent or more.

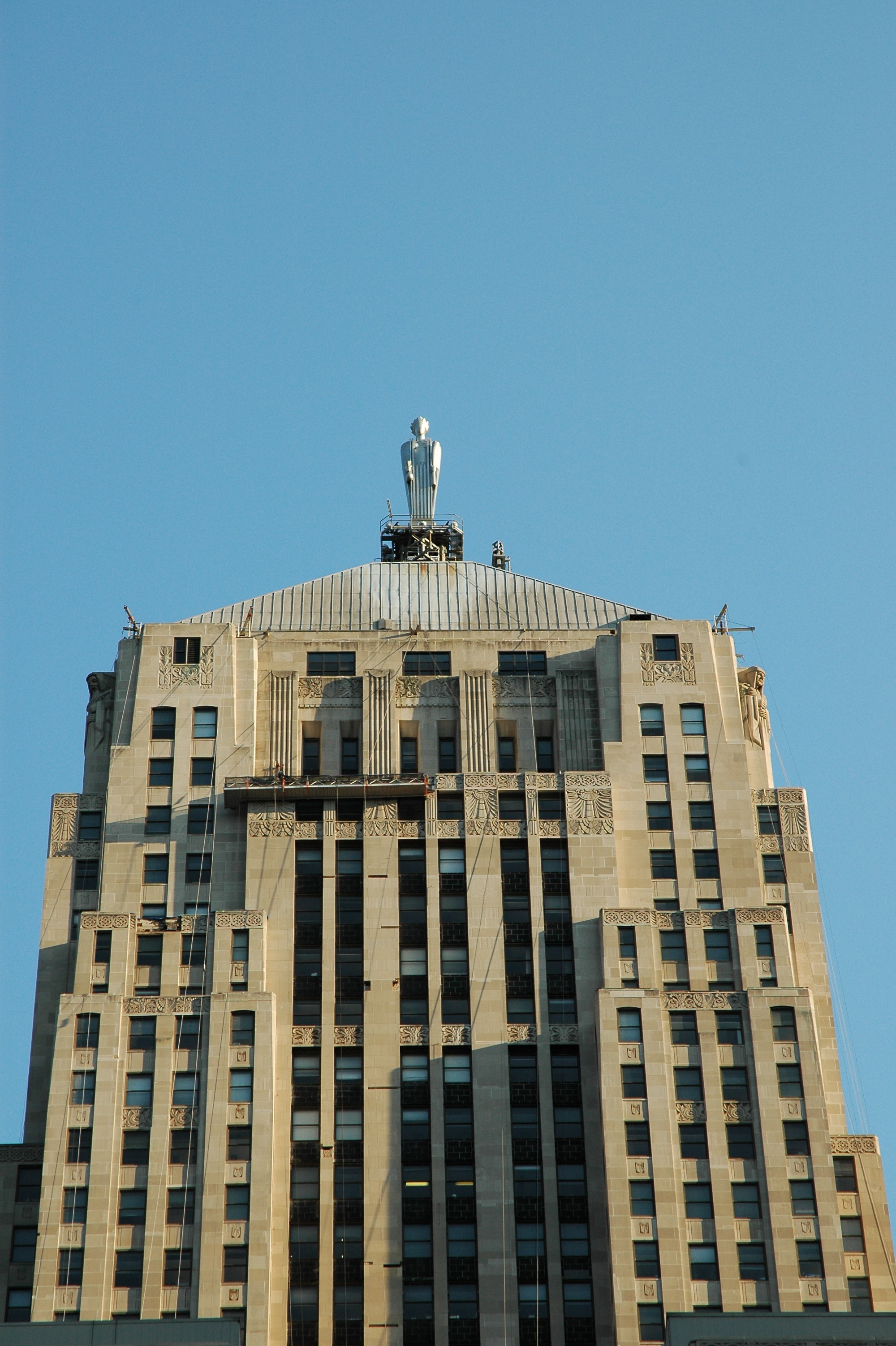
Ceres (1930) atop the Board of Trade Building lends its name to Ceres Cafe, a cocktail bar in the lobby, open weekdays at 7 a.m., known for its "strong drinks" and "heavy pours."

Mikey's first onscreen appearance, in "Ceres," established him as a warm, funny man who acted paternally toward his younger siblings and made a point to involve "cousin" Richie at every turn, telling raucous tales from his younger days, at which "Carmy laughs...though Natalie acts annoyed, it's obvious this is a usual and comforting dynamic." In the season 1 finale, Richie recovers a note that Mikey left for Carmy. It includes the family's inspirational catchphrase, an "I love you, dude," and the key to a secret bequest that will allow Carmy to pursue his dream of redeeming their family restaurant, albeit without Mikey at his side. In Bernthal's first appearances as Mikey he had a bit of a nostalgic halo around him, he told The Hollywood Reporter in 2024: "I understood that what Chris Storer needed from that version of Mikey was this larger-than-life, charismatic guy. In the way that we sometimes glorify and romanticize folks that we've lost, we want to see this version of him—his winning smile and ability to take over a room with his energy." "Foreshadowing" Mikey's fate is LCD Soundsystem's "Call the Police," which "throbs underneath the scene like a siren dashing through the night."

As characterized in dialogue and flashbacks, "Mikey manages to conceal his addiction and debt problems from most of his extended family, always looking cheerful but never sharing his actual concerns with anyone: In this, he seems to mimic the ideal 'tough, silent guy' prototype of masculinity also evoked by Tony Soprano throughout the eponymous series. His silence persists even after his suicide, as too does his patriarchal dominance." Mikey's insobriety and his insolvency may be linked. In this way he may take after his dad, who (per Jimmy in "Dogs") had a gambling problem and often acted impulsively. On the far end of his 30s he still lives with his mom, seemingly financially dependent on her and other relatives, and while on a make-work errand from Jimmy, "He's just sitting in the driver's seat, listening to Eric B. & Rakim's 'Paid in Full,' a track with lyrics that speak to the money problems we know Mikey is battling ('I dig into my pocket, all my money spent/So I dig deeper but still coming up with lint')." He sold the air rights to the restaurant to Crazy Mary in 2018 for $2,500. He later borrows $300,000 from Jimmy for one last business idea.

The season 2 episode "Fishes" exposed a darker side of Mikey. As described by Bernthal, the key to understanding Mikey in "Fishes" is to be found in the two private moments when he's alone in the pantry: "the moment that he's sitting there waiting for [Carmy], suggesting that he's feeling the buzz of the pills that he just took, but more importantly, afterward: They leave him there to sit in that pain, and to show it. That moment was understanding that this dream was never going to happen, this was never going to work because he knew where he was headed. He knew where he was going." Later, at the dinner table, as Uncle Lee (Bob Odenkirk) and Mikey face off, Michael "goes from raging to impish to laughing to near tears all within a few minutes and the frightened and stoney faces of those around the table suggest that this is not an unusual occurrence. It's hard to watch." This erratic, deteriorating, explosive, strung-out Mikey is probably the one Richie and Donna (Jamie Lee Curtis) were living with during the last five years before his suicide, while Mikey's refusal to communicate with Carmy during that period kept him ignorant of Mikey's addiction and unbalanced state of mind.

In the Ayo Edebiri-directed "Napkins", the audience is introduced to another positive form of Mikey, the one Tina (Liza Colón-Zayas) was thinking of when she told Carmy how she "loved him a lot" in season one's "Braciole". In "Napkins", the "most charming" version of Mikey encounters a tearful Tina in the dining room of the Original Beef, and after initially trying to get Richie to handle it, he approaches the crying woman himself. He shows Tina a photo that Carmy sent from Copenhagen, of a sunshiney Noma dish made with trout roe and "beach herbs" (purslane tips, beach cress blossoms, chickweed), and the friendly strangers agree they have no idea what they are looking at. Mikey brags, "My baby brother, he's a chef...He's the shit." (Years later, Tina transmits this message of pride and affection back to Carmy, albeit without attribution, reassuring him at an insecure moment in his life: "You da shit, baby. You've got nothing to prove.") In "Napkins," the audience gets to spend time with a healthy, confident Michael Berzatto who can be:

...an empathetic friend who can recognize the pain in others...when he offers Tina a job on the spot, he doesn't pretend he's doing her a favor. In fact, it seems like she's the one doing him a favor. This is the Mikey that is truly embedded within the walls of The Bear restaurant and The Bear the show. It's kindness, neighborly love, honesty, and non-judgment. Everything in the show and in the restaurant works best when they're operating under the ideals the real Mikey exemplified.

As depicted in the season 4 episode "Groundhogs," Carmy still periodically sends texts to Mikey's old phone number, updating him on life changes, along with messages like "Miss you bro," and "Thinking of you today." The flashback scene in "Groundhogs," during which Carmy suggests calling their dream restaurant Mikey's, before Mikey proposes calling it the Bear, plays out to Led Zeppelin's "That's the Way," a "gentle, melancholic, and quietly devastating [song]...acoustic strum and yearning lyrics mirror Carmy's frozen grief." At Tiffany's (Gillian Jacobs) wedding, Lee discloses that in life Mikey closely followed Carmen's career, and knew he was wrapping fish in potatoes with Daniel Boulud and making food from ants at Noma and that he was proud. (Richie alludes to Noma being a place where they "eat bugs" way back in season 1's "Hands.") But for all that, Mikey seemingly never replied to Carmy's messages or told him any of that directly.

In a 2025 interview, Curtis suggested that Mikey may have struggled with untreated mental illness from an early age:

The script is beautiful. I learned that having a kid who you don't know how to help is one of the most powerless experiences as a parent. I personally have a child with special needs. I have a child who has a learning difference. And the powerlessness you feel when you can't actually help them—you can find people who can help them, but you can't. So the part of that scene [in "Tonnato"] that gets me every time is when she talks about Mike. Because clearly Mike had that problem since he was a little boy. And being a parent and not being able to help your kid and not knowing what to do to help them—and finding that alcohol just made it all more palatable and easy—to play a woman who has struggled with that, and then to have the beautiful writing that articulates that exact powerlessness and turmoil, and resulting shame and self-hatred, and then the addiction on top of it—I just thought it was a beautifully constructed.

== Other attributes ==
Of the three Berzatto siblings, only Mikey has "stereotypical" Italian-American features—dark-haired and swarthy, Mikey also bears evidence of a once-broken nose.

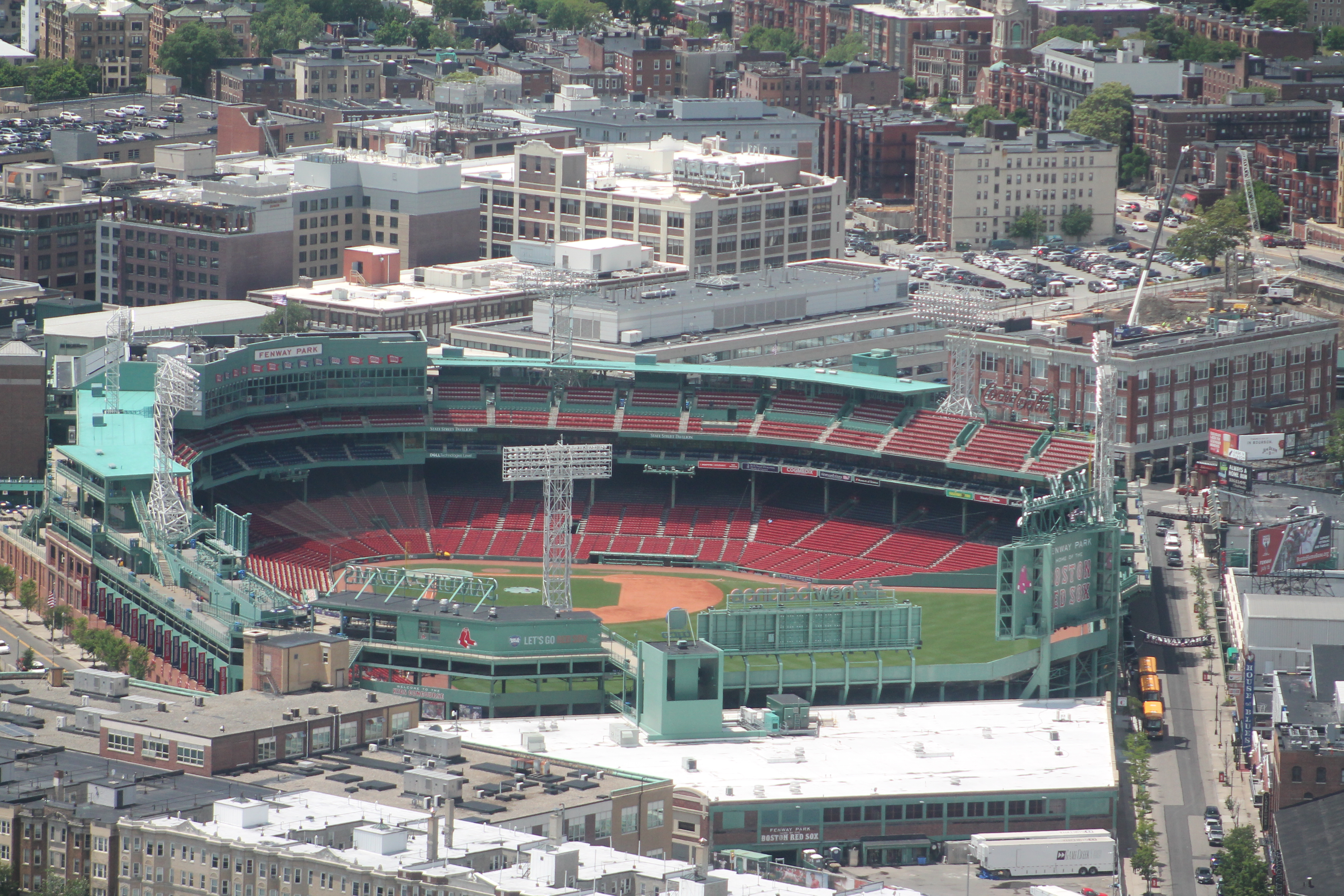
Lifelong Chicagoan Mikey is a Red Sox fan and has a poster of Fenway Park in his office

Mikey has an interest in ice hockey, based on his story in "Ceres" about encountering Chicago Blackhawks players Denis Savard, Chris Chelios, and Ed Belfour at a party at Ceres Cafe, and the "classified" hockey stick found behind the lockers in season 2. Richie told Sherri/Sarah (Marin Ireland) in "Gary" that Mikey was an EBUG ("emergency backup goalie") for the Blackhawks; Sherri used this claim to open a conversation with Michael, but later admits that she never believed it. According to Richie, Mikey was a fan of the Boston Red Sox. Mikey had a poster of Fenway Park in his office. There are plastic souvenir Red Sox cups in his truck in "Gary."

== Posthumous presence ==
Mikey's suicide by self-inflicted gunshot launched the events of the series. Carmy attended Mikey's funeral momentarily before returning to New York to wrap up his life there before permanently moving back to Chicago, arriving at the Beef in approximately summer 2022. The picture on Mikey's funeral card that lingers in the kitchen depicts Christ as the Good Shepherd, painted by Josef Kastner for a Carmelite church in Döbling, Vienna, Austria, and the Bible verse was Daniel 6:22, which reads in the King James Version as "My God hath sent his angel, and hath shut the lions' mouths, that they have not hurt me: forasmuch as before him innocency was found in me; and also before thee, O king, have I done no hurt." Mikey's premature death by suicide summoned Carmy back to Chicago as both a "prodigal son and a father replacement for the orphaned kitchen staff."

In the words of The Daily Beast in 2026, "Mikey's ghost essentially haunts every episode of The Bear." In some ways dead Mikey serves as a convenient narrative repository for the way "'[g]hostly matters are part of social life' and the paradoxical nature of ghosts/hauntings. That is, the material-discursive entanglements that are braided within how people come to relate to each other and the more-than-human world." Mikey is known to the audience through flashbacks "that primarily highlight Carmen's memories of his brother," but the consequences of Mikey's "silent struggles" are illuminated by how his "sense of masculinity shape[d] the restaurant's communication and spaces...highly toxic, sexist, and dysfunctional...[Richie] is introduced as the carrying the torch of the deceased Michael. And he does so by running the business like him: loudly, violently, with a lack of patience and a disregard for everybody else's feelings and concerns." In an article published in the Journal of Palliative Medicine in 2026, a doctor wrote, "Among the many things the show gets right is its depiction of Michael's complex nature. He appears intermittently in flashbacks—charismatic, volatile, loving, and deeply unwell. The show avoids flattening him into either a villain or a saint. Instead, it honors a truth many bereaved family members know intimately: that love and harm can coexist, and that grief is often tangled with anger, guilt, and longing. This moral complexity feels honest. Families at the bedside frequently carry similar contradictions: devotion entangled with resentment, tenderness alongside regret. The show grants its characters—and by extension, its viewers—permission to be messy in their mourning."

One critic described the Mikey of "Braciole" as something like a Force ghost from the Star Wars universe. In the season 1 finale, wrote one critic, the dead man comes into his own:

The Bear is right now the best active show on television. Storer, along with cast and crew, take a deceptively simple premise—the makeover of a struggling restaurant—and invest it with great depth of character, wonderful eccentricities, existential angst, and on occasion, moments of hard won beauty that elevates the series far beyond its basic concept. For me, in season one, the best example of that beauty was in the very last scene, when we see Jon Bernthal's impossibly handsome mug looking back over his shoulder at Carmen. It's an almost spiritual moment, where two brothers who have lost each other find their way back, even though Michael is no longer on this earth. I remember my heart leaping at the moment. It reminded me of why I do what I do. Why I watch, and just as significantly, why I write about what I watch.

Another critic wrote of season 1, "Mikey's bemused apparition drops in from time to time just to see how things are working out at the Original Beef."

== Critical reception ==
Bernthal has received critical acclaim for his performance as Mikey and won a guest star Primetime Emmy Award in 2024 for "Fishes". He was also nominated for "Braciole" and "Napkins".

In large part due to Bernthal's performance, which has been called "unfailingly riveting," Mikey haunts the narrative and is "the most important" figure in the assembly of the family as it exists in the series. BuzzFeed commented on Bernthal's Mikey in 2025, writing, "'The Walking Dead actor is beyond perfect as Mikey, Carmy and Sugar's older brother who died before the start of the series. His energy is so warm and sincere that I genuinely forget he's acting. Including him in flashbacks was such a smart choice, and it makes his death hit even harder. Bernthal 1000 percent deserved that Emmy." Another critic agreed that Bernthal's rendering of Mikey's tragic arc is heart-wrenching: "...every time Michael is in an episode, I end up sobbing."

== See also ==
- List of The Bear characters
- List of The Bear episodes
- Food of The Bear
- Music on The Bear
- Family on The Bear

== Sources ==
- Di Maio, Cristina (2025). "New Italian American Fathering in the Time of the Gig Economy: The Case of The Bear". Diasporic Italy: Journal of the Italian American Studies Association. 5. Champaign, Illinois: University of Illinois Press: 105–121. doi:10.5406/27697738.05.1.08. ISSN 2769-772X. OCLC 1267410841.
- Franklin-Phipps, Asilia; Varga, Bretton A. (Fall 2024). "Bear(ing) Down: Encountering Posthuman Critical Media Studies through the (Re)tracing of Object and Embodiment". Journal of Posthumanism. 4 (3): 205–216. doi:10.33182/joph.v4i3.3290. ISSN 2634-3584.
- Grazia Serra, Alessandra Olga (May 2024). "The Bear: New (stereotypical) representations of Italian Americans in contemporary television series". Forum Italicum: A Journal of Italian Studies. 58 (1): 114–124. doi:10.1177/00145858231223974. ISSN 0014-5858.
- Muthumanickam, Aruna (February 17, 2026). "The Bear". Journal of Palliative Medicine 10966218261418107. doi:10.1177/10966218261418107. ISSN 1096-6218. PMID 41700973.
- Singer, Christoph (2026). "The chef and the city: Mobile masculinities in Chef and The Bear". Journal of Urban Cultural Studies. 13 (1): 119–132. doi:10.1386/jucs_00114_1. ISSN 2050-9790.
