= Music of The Bear =

Television soundtrack (2022–2026)

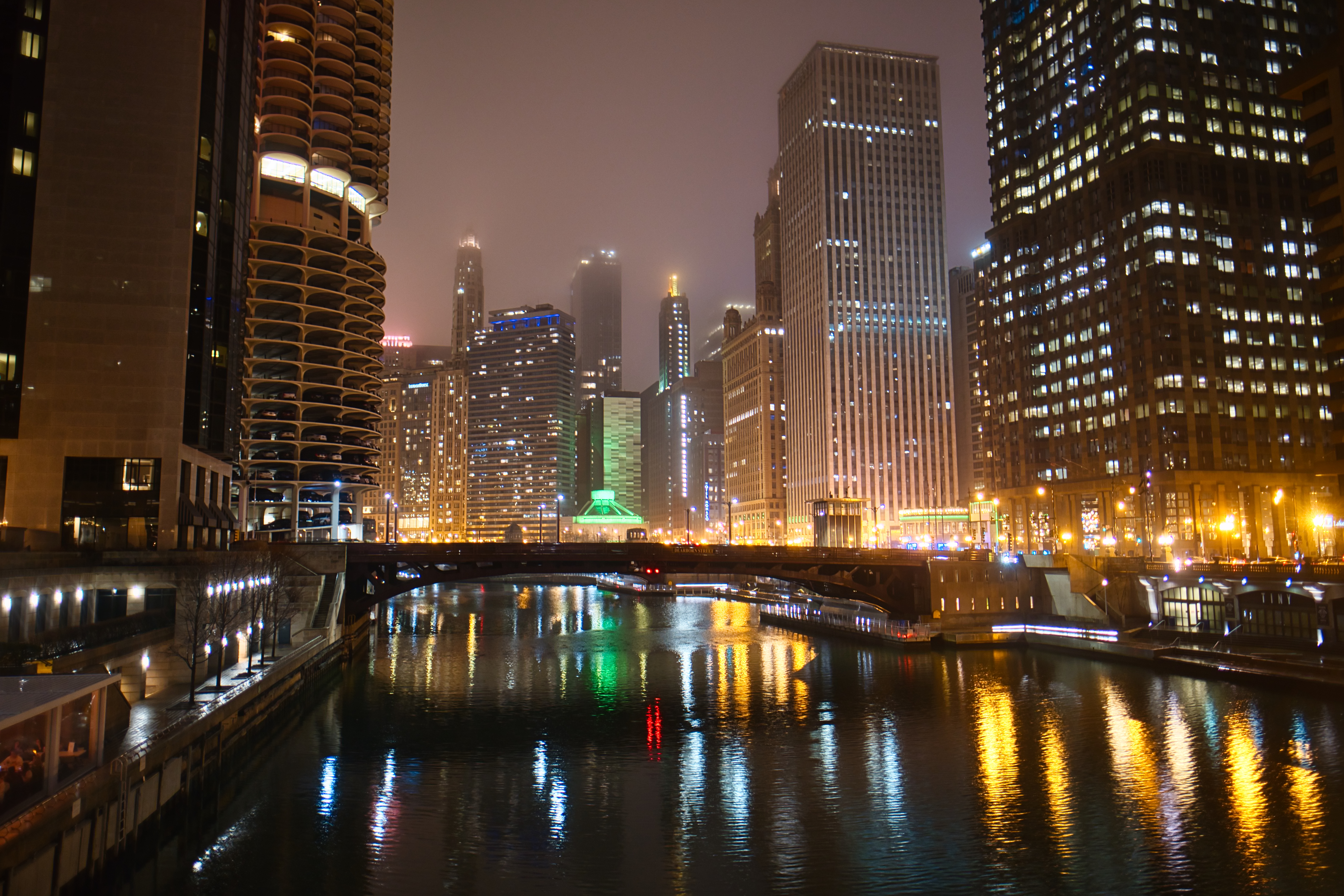
Chicago from the Clark Street Bridge, site of Carmy's Bear dream

The soundtrack music of the 2022–2026 American television series The Bear is chosen by music supervisors and executive producers Christopher Storer and Josh Senior. Per Senior, before production began in earnest on the series, Storer sent out "50 or 60 songs" to the production team with the message "'This is what the show sounds like.'" Ayo Edebiri has said that Storer has musicality top of mind: "That's Chris' thing...there's different movements. His own challenge that he puts on himself, and that, in turn, puts on us, is that we're still in the same piece of music, but everything just has a different feeling." Jeremy Allen White has described Carmy searching "for the right tempo." The Los Angeles Times TV critic wrote in 2024, "[The Bear is] a fundamentally musical show—and not just in terms of its use of recordings to underscore or create counterpoint with the action...but constructed tonally, rhythmically...the impact of the series is less literary than it is musical; it lights up the limbic system." According to one critic, the song choices "are auditory frames for a moving tale...There is an intention behind every selection. This isn't a soundtrack to play out behind the action, a score to bring a little bit of colour to the quieter moments, this is an integral part of the show's prowess."

One scholarly study of the show argued that "the task outlined by The Bear is to transform chaotic noise...into music in order to attempt the creation of the new." The series begins with a general racket (punk and rage and syncopated edits). Season 3 is punctuated by tense silences. These moods slowly give way to the melodies of season 4, as the crew begin to "listen to one another, and, in general, find love and comfort. Love songs...litter the soundtrack." Melanie McFarland wrote in Salon.com that season 5 is a "harmonious response to the feral call of the first." Many selections connect to a Chicago or Midwestern United States sense of identity: "The sound of the city combines ethnic musical traditions with the vitality of urban culture, demonstrating a solid emotional link between places, their sonic representation, and people who value the particular sound of music." The local talent showcase includes, but is not limited to, Mavis Staples, Wilco, John Cougar Mellencamp, the Smashing Pumpkins, Sufjan Stevens, and Curtis Mayfield.

The show frequently uses multiple instances of the same song spread over seasons, multiple versions of the same song, or a series of distinct excerpts from the same song. The A.V. Club asserted that the show's use of live concert tracks (rather than studio-recorded album versions) provided a "scrappy quality" to the show, and "a different, less sealed-off sound and energy to the more personal moments." Some critics have described the music selections as dated "dad rock," and expressed surprise or disappointment that so few of the tracks are 21st-century music (with exceptions like Adrianne Lenker's 2024 release "No Machine"). Others have called The Bear's compilation soundtrack "stellar," "exemplary," and one of "the finest" or "best" soundtracks in contemporary television.

== Opening credits ==
=== "Chicago" by Sufjan Stevens ===
Episode 7 "Review" in season 1 begins with a Chicago radio broadcaster announcing, "I'm Lin Brehmer, your best friend in the whole world. It's great to be alive!" (Note: Brehmer died of prostate cancer six months after the episode was released.) Brehmer introduces a demo version of the 2005 Sufjan Stevens song "Chicago," from the Illinoise album. One writer commented about the lyrics, "'You came to take us, all things go, all things go,' sings Sufjan. 'To recreate us—all things grow, all things grow.' The audience is nothing if not hopeful about these broken characters and their possibility for growth and recovery in the face of abuse, trauma, and miscommunication. The irony is that this hopeful track sets up one of the most disastrous days at The Beef, making the much-repeated lyric 'I've made a lot of mistakes in my mind' much more appropriate." The song accompanies a montage of Chicago urbanism.

=== "All Alone on Christmas" by Darlene Love ===
Episode 14 "Fishes" in season 2 uses "All Alone on Christmas," a 1992 single by Phil Spector survivor Darlene Love, for the opening credits.

=== "The Day the World Went Away" by Nine Inch Nails ===
Episode 17 "Omelette" (also season 2) has opening credits and a sex scene between Carmy Berzatto (Jeremy Allen White) and Claire Dunlap (Molly Gordon) to a minute excerpt from "The Day the World Went Away," Trent Reznor's "moody masterpiece" from The Fragile, "perhaps intended to convey the idea that, amidst the relentless white noise of modern life, love can elevate the human spirit to transcend obstacles, stresses, and set-backs. LOL. File under 'the calm before the storm'." Screen Rant thought the song choice suggested Carmy "getting swept up in his romance with Claire."

=== "Save It for Later" by Eddie Vedder ===
Cover art for "Save It for Later" by Eddie Vedder (2024)

Episode 20 "Next" features a season 3 Chicago-hospitality montage set to "Save It for Later" by Eddie Vedder, who recorded this studio version for The Bear.

As described by American Songwriter, the Vedder version has "more of a quiet, anticipatory lead-up...[not] quite as brash as the original. The English Beat version definitely has more of a brit-rock flavor, while Vedder's version is firmly rooted in U.S. grunge." The song "frequently tap[s] the emotion of scenes that feature Ayo Edebiri's character, Sydney Adamu, facing change." The 1982 Beat version of "Save It for Later" plays when Sydney Adamu (Ayo Edebiri) meets up with Chef Shapiro (Adam Shapiro) in "Legacy. The Eddie Vedder version reprises in the season 4 episode "Tonnato," when Carmy visits his mom. Pearl Jam's "Animal," which ends the pilot episode and reappears in the season 2 finale, centers a narrator "in victim mode, 'five against one,' and asking 'why would you want to hurt me?' The shift from 'Animal' to 'Save It For Later' feels like personal growth, from acknowledging only the hurt that exists to admitting to the need for connection that lives beneath it."

Other Vedder songs used on the show are "Come Back," and two versions of "Throw Your Arms Around Me," an Australian-born song that lyrically suggests "both a booty call and a memento mori." The version that plays when the Bears pass the fire-suppression and gas-line tests is a collaboration between Vedder and Crowded House frontman Neil Finn, recorded for the 2013 tribute album Crucible. This music continues playing as Claire kisses Carmy over dinner. A Pearl Jam official bootleg, recorded at a concert in Indiana, plays during Claire and Carmy's conversation at the "Bears" wedding.

== Repeated artists ==
=== Wilco and Mavis Staples ===
The Chicago band Wilco makes multiple appearances in the soundtrack of The Bear. An early critic of the show's depiction of the city complained about "a full Wilco soundtrack without any house music or Kanye." The song "Via Chicago" is used in the pilot episode and in the trailer for season 1.

"Impossible Germany," from the 2007 Sky Blue Sky album, plays during the entire four-minute, 45-second final segment of the episode "Sheridan," when the lights are back on after a power outage, and clean dishes are coming out of the Hobart. Carmy and Syd work in parallel, as "Carmy deveins shrimp and talks with Sydney." The song follows Syd onto the Pink Line to her dad's apartment: "We see the remnants of her failed Sheridan Road Catering business, all piled up in her room, and we see just how close she lives to the El. We also see that, like Carmy, she seems to live, breathe, and dream food, even waking up from a deep sleep to jot something down about a cola short rib braise." All 11 minutes of the Kicking Television: Live in Chicago version of "Spiders (Kidsmoke)" play during the "Review" crisis, and "Spiders (Kidsmoke)" reprises briefly in the season 2 finale "The Bear." The episode "Beef" uses the Kicking Television version of "Handshake Drugs," "which gets even skronkier than the studio version, chasing some Television-esque guitar solos to ground and frantically exploding into a crescendo," while Sugar (Abby Elliott) explains IRS stipulations and DBAs to Carmy. "I'm Always in Love (Early Run Through)" plays in the season 4 episode "Sophie."

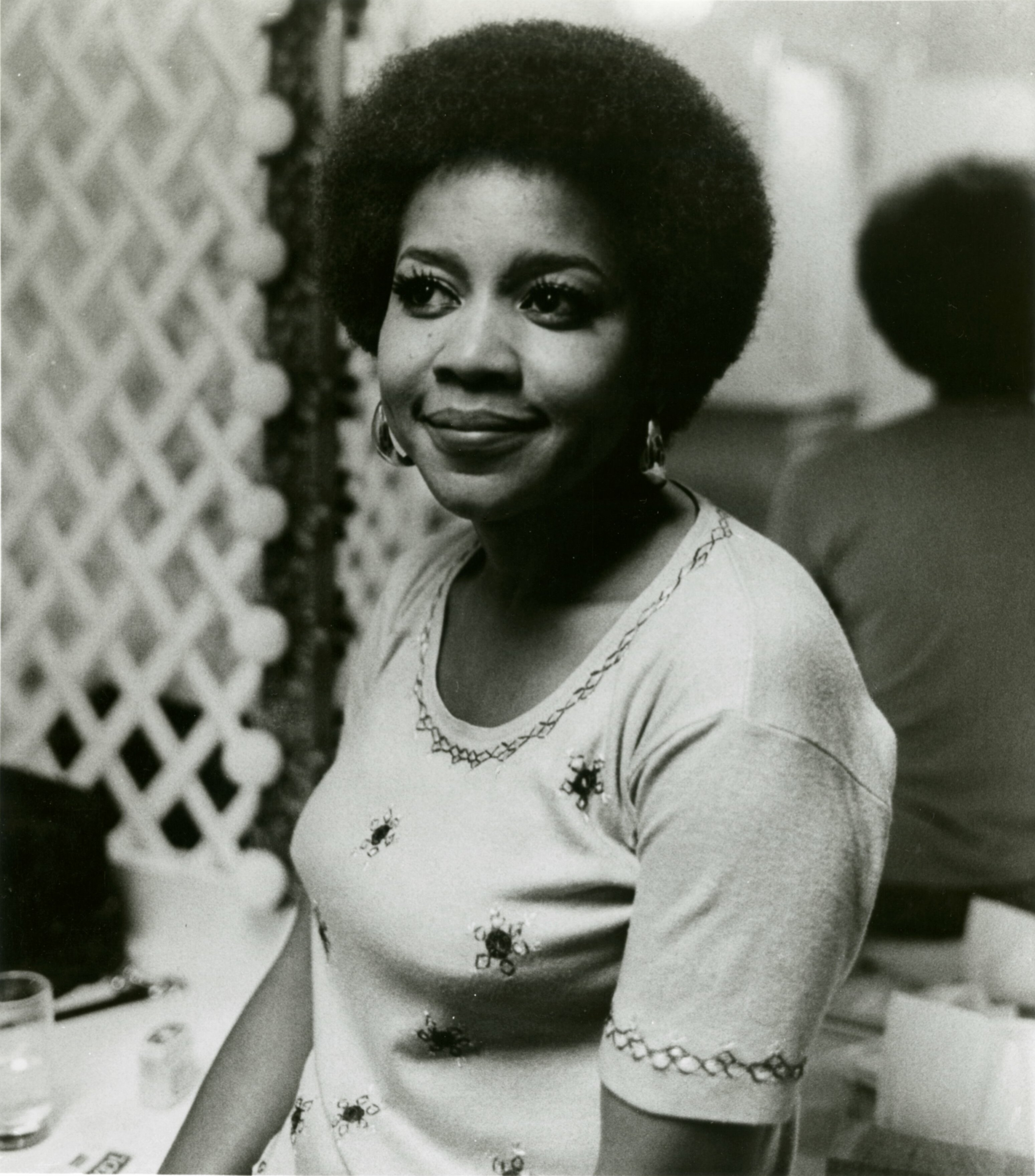
Mavis Staples has been described as a "living legend" (1971)

"You Are Not Alone" by Mavis Staples, which was written and produced by Jeff Tweedy and recorded at the Wilco loft, plays in "Pasta" around Sydney and Emmanuel's (Robert Townsend) celebration of her late mom, as ceiling mold hits Richie (Ebon Moss-Bachrach), Ebra (Edwin Lee Gibson) listlessly cuts celery in an empty kitchen, and Carmy "joylessly" cooks "in a barren apartment." "I Like the Things About Me" ends the next episode, "Sundae," "on a strident and self-affirming note." (Note: In the special episode "Gary," set in Michael Jackson's hometown of Gary, Indiana, Mikey points out the landmark Michael Jackson Childhood Home and jokingly blurts, "Shamone!" Jackson's "Shamone!" was a tribute to Mavis Staples, who first used the exclamation in the 1970s.)

=== Kim Deal ===
Kim Deal's music is used in seasons 1 and 2. "Saints" by the Breeders promises "summer is ready when you are" in episode 2. Sydney begins episode 5 to the sounds of the L Train and the 2013 instrumental version of "Wish I Was". Lyrics like "We will wade in the shine of the ever We will wade in the tides of the summer" from "Velouria" by Pixies inject "tenderness amid the heat and tension" onto the Bear's opening-night playlist.

=== The Replacements ===
The Replacements appear in season 2, beginning with "Bastards of Young", serving in The Bear, and in other media, as what The New Yorker deemed a "calling card of sorts for misfit stories with a socioeconomic subtext." Fak (Matty Matheson) tells contractor Tim that "Can't Hardly Wait" is the "greatest, like, high school song ever written," which inserts "Pop" into a meta-debate about "why the Minneapolis rockers are so severely underrated," and sets up Claire and Carmy's climactic "Can't Hardly Wait" hookup in the under-construction restaurant. "Within Your Reach" from the Hootenany album and the Say Anything... soundtrack surfaces in the season 3 finale.

=== Taylor Swift ===
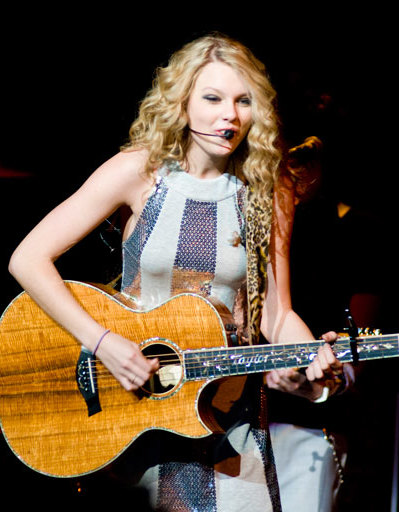
Taylor Swift performs in Joliet, Illinois (2008)

Evie Jerimovich's favorite singer is Taylor Swift, and Swift CDs are on permanent rotation in dad Richie's car CD player. "Love Story (Taylor's Version)" features prominently in "Forks," which Collider ranked fourth on its "top 10 uses of Taylor Swift on TV" list. In 2025, a critic wrote that The Bear uses music differently than do other prestigious shows like Succession, Industry, Severance, and Euphoria, in that song selections serve "like a great relish [that] simply enhances the brilliant writing and acting on screen...The emotional pay‑off isn't hinted at or teased by the music—that's all down to Moss‑Bachrach's superb acting. Through the use of Taylor Swift's 'Love Story (Taylor's Version)', played while Richie drives home with a new contentment, that realisation just unfolds. The song—through the chorus refrain of 'It's a love story, baby just say yes'—carries the feeling as plainly and literally as possible."

"Long Live (Taylor's Version)," originally from the 2010 Speak Now album, plays from inside the house during the Richie–Frank (Josh Hartnett) conversation in "Violet." Actress Gillian Jacobs said, "It makes total sense that Frank would want to be a Swiftie dad. He has his nails painted in that scene, and I'm sure he's got his friendship bracelets ready to go." Tiff wears friendship bracelets to her wedding-dress fitting, and "Style (Taylor's Version)," originally released on the 1989 album, plays at her wedding.

In season 2, Tiff wears a 1989 Tour sweatshirt from 2015 to Christmas dinner 2018, and Richie asks Cicero (Oliver Platt) for concert tickets, initially hoping that he, Evie, and Tiff can go as a family. In season 3, Eva sleeps under an Eras Tour blanket, and Richie wears friendship bracelets to work.

=== Trent Reznor and Atticus Ross ===
Compositions by Reznor and Atticus Ross recur between episodes 15 ("Forks") and 28 ("Forever"), including instrumentals from the musical scores of Waves, Mid90s, and The Vietnam War, and pieces from the Ghosts series, including "Hope We Can Again," which plays for "10 crushing minutes" during "The Bear" and "somehow fits each scene perfectly, going from poignant to ominous to soothing without the music ever really changing." Reznor and Ross customized "Together" for its use as score music, looped three times as the sole music in "Tomorrow," and "13 Ghosts II" is paired with the legerdemain montage. One critic called the music of season 3 "very Nine Inch Nails-ish, basically one long drone...a real snooze-fest." Others found the music compelling, particularly the use of "Together" "shifting in tempo as we're pushed further into Carmy's state of mind."

=== Brian Wilson ===
Brian Wilson is an "icon" of 20th-century American popular music, but the restaurant's opening-night playlist includes the 2003 Brian Wilson Presents Smile recording of one of "the weirdest Beach Boys songs," the "Vega-Tables." "Vega-Tables" plays when Carmy visits the dining room to serve Claire, and encounters Sugar, who just lost a fight with the toilet. To score the scene in "Fishes" where Pete (Chris Witaske) brings a casserole to a gathering in the midwestern United States, the show uses a version of "Fire" called "Mrs. O'Leary's Cow," also from Brian Wilson Presents Smile.

=== Weezer ===
The show uses four Weezer songs, most notably "Getchoo" in "Violet," which accompanies the news of the forthcoming Chicago Tribune review. "Getchoo" comes from Pinkerton (1996), a confessional, intertextual, horny, power-pop record, "initially panned" but eventually "critically reevaluated...unlike our favourite albums, restaurants often aren't afforded the gift of a second chance." Another music columnist noted that Pinkerton features a "problematic genius [who] tries to rationalize his behavior even though he might just be a toxic jerk. For that reason, bringing The Bear and Pinkerton together for the closing credits...was especially inspired."

"Forever" opens with the Blue Album's "In the Garage," which provides a "quiet-loud-quiet crunch" of distorted electric guitar to establishing shots of Chicago along with lyrics about the joys of playing Dungeons & Dragons with friends while listening to Kiss songs. "Fishes" closes with "The Christmas Song," and deep cut "Suzanne" (1994) plays during Michelle's (Sarah Paulson) encounter with Donna at the wedding.

=== Van Morrison ===
The Bear uses four live Van Morrison tracks, including "Slim Slow Slider/I Start Breaking Down (Live)" in "Scallop." Executive producer Senior said "Saint Dominic's Preview" felt like "Richie being vulnerable, and...the same song mean[t] something totally different for Carmy." "Here Comes the Night" in "Pop" is "dark, brooding guitar pop" about infidelity, playing at the house party Carmy attends with Claire.

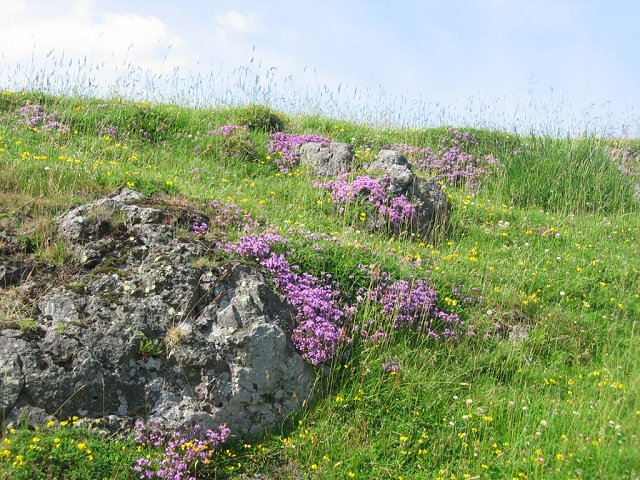
Wild mountain thyme

"Purple Heather" (elsewhere titled "Will Ye Go, Lassie, Go?") is a folk song, originally about transhumance in the Scottish Highlands, the "migration of people and their cattle to the summer shielings...a wider landscape of habitation and productivity, known to anthropologists as a taskscape." A song of "reassuring warmth and sense of collective destiny," Morrison's narrator sings "And we'll all go together / In the wild mountain thyme / All around the blooming heather." The lyrics allude to the idea that "the thyme plant was the fairies' playground." "Purple Heather" has been described as "a little mysterious, a little magical." The song was described as "the perfect soundtrack to a bittersweet sequence" in "Children" where Carmy finds out that his mentor, Chef Terry (Olivia Colman), is letting go of both her restaurant and her staff.

=== The Decemberists ===
Carmy asks Fak for advice on whether or not Claire is his girlfriend to "The Crane Wife 3" by The Decemberists, part of a 2006 song cycle inspired by Japanese folktales about the crane wife. "A Beginning Song," the last track on the band's seventh album, What a Terrible World, What a Beautiful World (2015), is the "centerpiece" song of the "Bears" wedding episode that works as "a slow-build crescendo of hope."

== Songs ==
=== "New Noise" ===
"New Noise," from Refused, a "screamo/death metal/post-hardcore" Swedish punk-rock band, is used five times over four seasons. "New Noise," which serves as a "recurring theme" in scenes with "visceral pacing," comes from an album, The Shape of Punk to Come, that was released just as the band broke up in 1998, and that, per lead singer Dennis Lyxzén, could have been entitled Fuck You. One critic characterized "New Noise" as a "ticking guitar riff [that] sizzles like the wick of lit dynamite...usually surfaced whenever Carmen's blood pressure [is] about to pop." The A.V. Club described it as a musical rallying cry, not unlike Mikey's "let it rip," that voices an ethos of "pushing back against old ways of doing things, introducing unorthodox methods and ingredients to tired recipes." A 2023 critique argued that The Bear's dependence on 20th-century tracks like "New Noise" was representative of the show's disappointing refusal to pair the show's young creatives with songs from "new, independent bands" making 21st-century music. Lyxzén told a music reporter in 2025, "I think with The Bear we did reach new people, but mostly it's my friends who are like 'Holy shit, you're on this show'."

=== "Strange Currencies" ===
"Strange Currencies (Remix)" by R.E.M. and "If You Want Blood You've Got It" from the 1979 AC/DC album Highway to Hell are the two songs used for The Bear season 2 trailer.

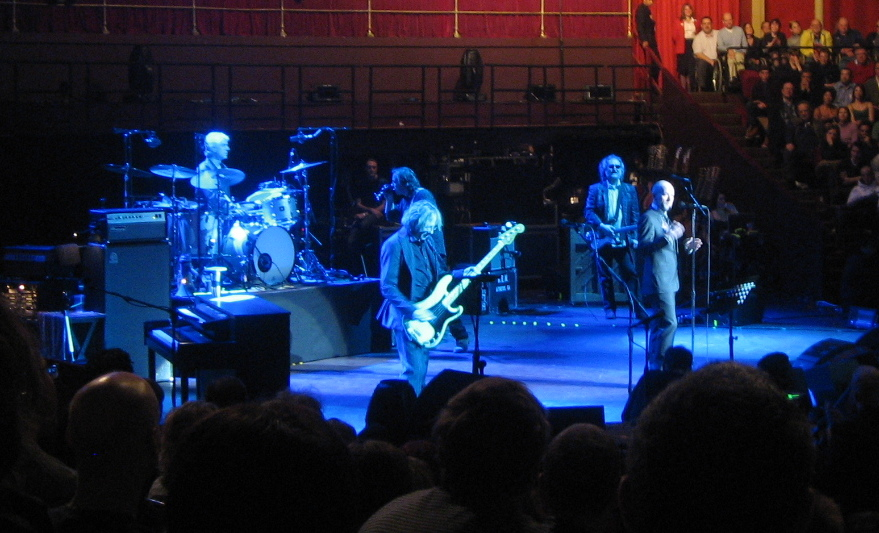
R.E.M. in concert at Royal Albert Hall (2008)

"Strange Currencies" first plays at the end of "Pasta," during Carmy and Claire's refrigerator-case reunion. The song, about "a lovelorn protagonist who yearns to win over a mysterious crush," becomes a recurring motif. The song plays over nighttime aerials of Chicago roads in "Pop," and again in "Omelette," as Carmy's alleyway panic attack, complete with uncontrollable hand spasms, plays out to a garbled, disrupted version of "Strange Currencies." In attempting to resolve his distress, "Carm tries to envision happier times with his current fling, Claire, but that only makes him spiral harder. And then, poof! All of his nerves go away the second he imagines his co-chef, Sydney," and the song reverts to normal. The song is "cross-blended" with Nine Inch Nails in "Apologies," and plays again in "Green" after Carmy promises to find Claire's green sweatshirt.

Los Angeles Times critic Lloyd wrote that the song plays the role of a love theme for The Bear. In 2025, the song was described as "the show's emotional Rosetta Stone." Other R.E.M. songs used on The Bear are "Oh My Heart," "Half a World Away," and "Finest Worksong."

=== "Glass, Concrete, and Stone" ===
"Glass, Concrete, and Stone," by David Byrne, from Grown Backwards (2004), accompanies a turning point in Richie's life. Todd Lazarski of the The A.V. Club notes "This episode is more, at heart, about learning to set your place at the table. And so is Byrne's song, which captures disappointment, disillusionment in the city and its jungle, your breath in the air on the walk to the car when it's not even light yet, 'waking at the crack of dawn, to send a little money home'...It is the fit for the Richie episode, for his quiet turn toward the guy that 'wears suits now'."

=== "Pearly-Dewdrops' Drops" ===
"Pearly-Dewdrops' Drops," a 1984 single by the Cocteau Twins, known for their "indecipherable lyrics," opens "Violet." Range magazine called it perfectly suited to the "memory of Carmy's now-tarnished relationship with Claire. The track punctuates a tragic hospital story told by Claire that details the odd, extreme lengths humans go to process the worst of emotional and physical pain. It's a tale just as surreal as the song accompanying it." Another critic described the "oddly soothing" song as important ambience "during a lengthy scene where the couple privately exchange war stories" about work. Uproxx deemed dream pop an appropriate genre for Carmy's reverie, and asked, "Is it possible that Carmy has invented a version of Claire in his mind that doesn't match up with reality? Do 'pearly-dewdrops' drops' exist in real life? I'm not so sure."

=== "Mixed Emotions" ===
The Bear season 3 trailer uses "Mixed Emotions" by the Rolling Stones. The song reflects the ambivalence of the main characters, with an "added layer of resonance" from "the fractured relationship between Mick Jagger and Keith Richards" that almost ended the band. However much past hurt and resentment were sincerely felt, the 1989 song "teems with confidence and harmony...'[So] get off the fence now, it's creasing your butt', Jagger sings hilariously."

=== "Only You Know" ===
Pairing Dion DiMucci's 1975 "Only You Know" with an evening snowfall in "Scallop" felt like "a collective reward," wrote one critic. Another argued that it stood in for every song "that gets played as the bar is closing, or the baseball game is over, your team lost, but you still believe in the next time...a corny, sweet, and emotional moment."

=== "So In Love" ===
Sydney's day off in "Worms" ends with "smooth, grounded warmth" via "So In Love," by Chicago native Curtis Mayfield, from There's No Place Like America Today, a 1975 LP about "love, sensuality, and...existence under the thumb of systematic oppression." "So in Love" over the closing credits has been described as "Chicago soul that feels like home," emphasizing that the city is "a diverse array of communities, not just a predominantly white one."

=== "Let Me Live in Your City" ===
In "Replicants," the Paul Simon ballad "Let Me Live in Your City" (released as a "work in progress" bonus track on the 2004 reissue of There Goes Rhymin' Simon), accompanies Carmy to Forest Avenue in the inner suburb of Oak Park, a nexus of Frank Lloyd Wright houses. The Hollywood Reporter wrote that the song "plays as Carmy drives alone, the camera catching the undersides of bridges and blurred city scenes...seeing the world through a dirty windshield. He visits the Frank Lloyd Wright Home and Studio, a sequence that flirts with travelogue territory but ultimately pulls us closer to him...Simon's warm, conversational vocals overlaying Carmy's quiet wandering makes the scene feel unusually intimate." Consequence thought that pairing Simon with the studio, the Prairie School-style Arthur and Grace Heurtley House, and the idiosyncratic Nathan G. Moore House, was "so lovely" that it was "a bit on the nose."

=== "I Got You Babe" ===
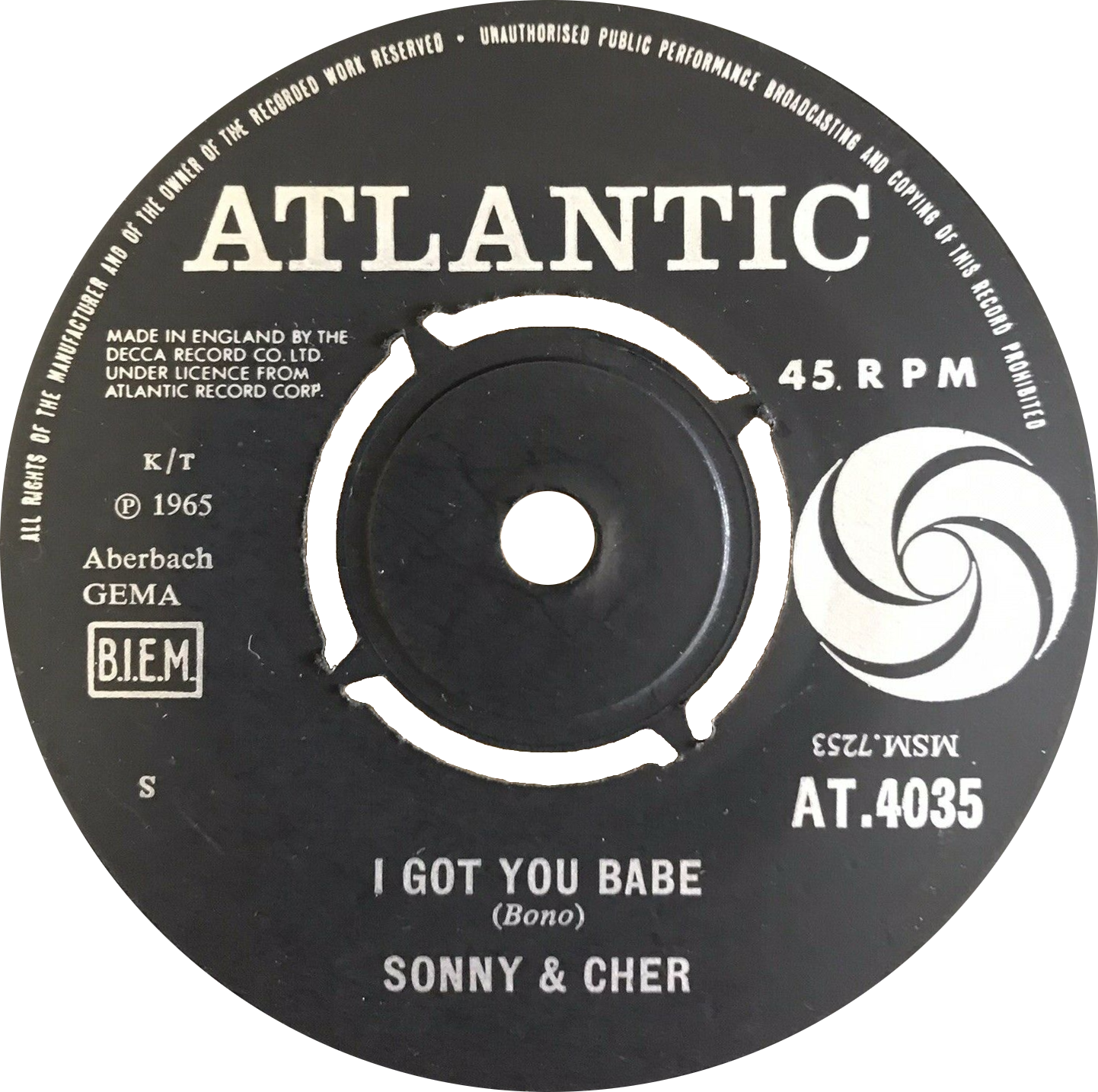
"I Got You Babe" (1965) is the alarm clock song Phil Connors suffers daily as a clairvoyant rodent's prisoner

"I Got You Babe" is first heard in "Groundhogs" ("put your little hand in mine / there ain't no hill or mountain we can't climb") when Carmy wakes up on his couch in front of a TV playing Groundhog Day, which was filmed 1993 in scenic Woodstock, Illinois, with a cast that included Abby Elliott's dad Chris Elliott as cameraman Larry. The protagonist of Groundhog Day is "disaffected jerk" Phil Connors (Bill Murray), who "finds himself trapped in a single day," seemingly immortal and omniscient.

"I Got You Babe" reprises in "Green," over an interstitial montage of ingredients, sophisticated dishes, and bills getting paid (overlaid with "profit line go up" graphics, and pie charts ticking over from "fucked" to "good"). Cracked writer Tara Ariano commented on inclusion of Groundhog Day: "If the movie is being used as an intertext here to make it very clear season 3's wheel-spinning was intentional...good one? But maybe now Storer can spin his wheels, like he's trying to drive himself and a screaming groundhog off a cliff, and step on it."

=== "Fast Slow Disco" ===
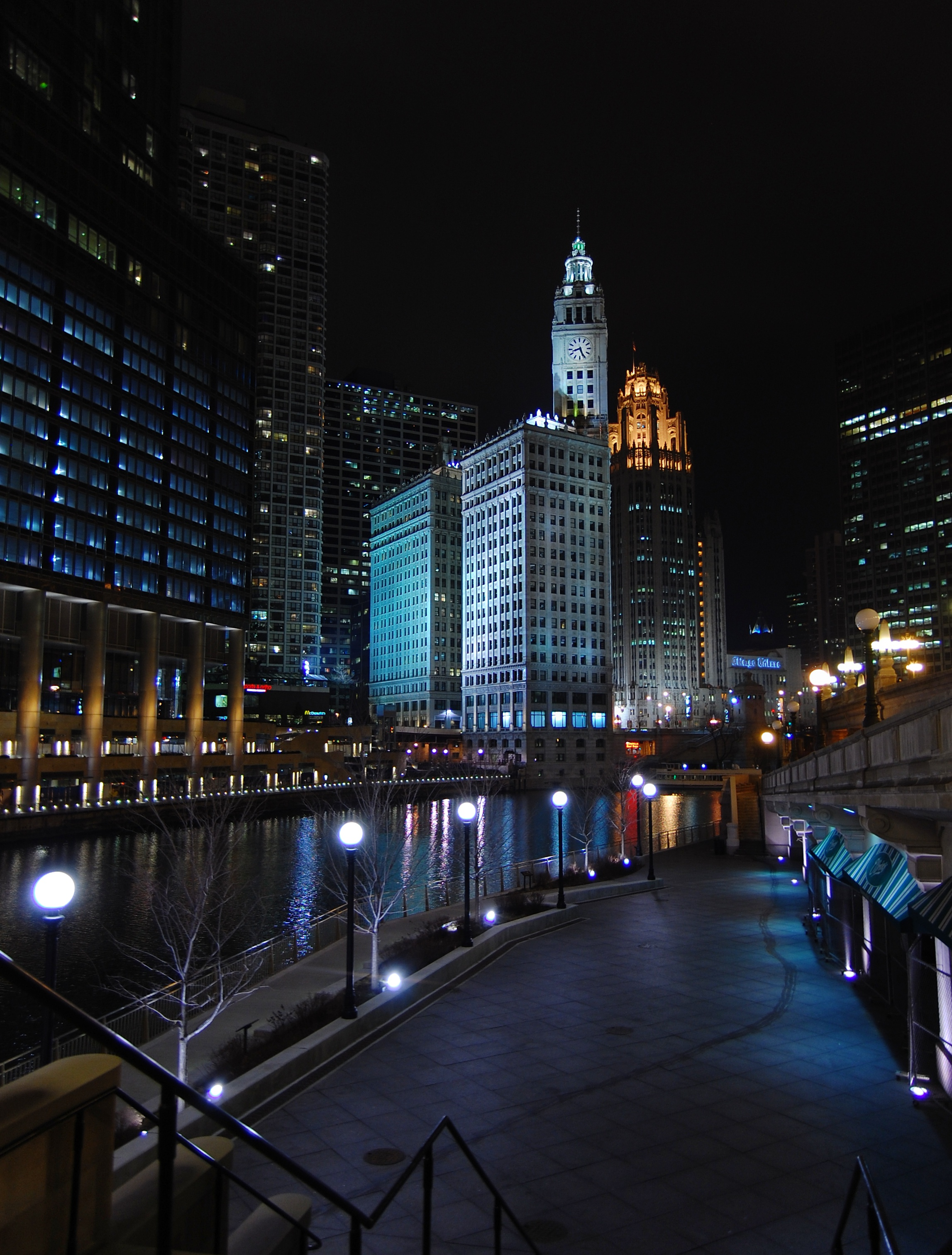
Chicago River, looking toward the Wrigley Building clocktower and gold-illuminated Tribune Tower

"Fast Slow Disco" by St. Vincent is the key music in the season 4 trailer. "Slow Disco" (co-written by Annie Clark and Joy Williams) from the 2017 Masseduction album plays over Sydney's kaleidoscopic scallop cook. The lyrics speak of "parallel lives...the path taken and the one you should or wish to have taken."

"Goodbye" has only one song, the remix "Fast Slow Disco," which as used in the season finale, "feels like a poignant reflection of Carmy getting ready to leave." American Songwriter magazine wrote, "Discos are places for people to dance. Not just dance, but party. When you think of Studio 54, you don't imagine tender waltzes. But Annie Clark's gorgeous tune ends with this: 'Don't it beat a slow dance to death?' If you're hooked on this show as I am, you'll understand how this relates to Carmy's behavior." Another critic described the use of sound and music in the episode as "silence, then spark," calling the song an "electric kiss goodnight."

== Repurposing existing soundtracks ==
The Bear's "deeply cinematic DNA" includes music recycled from existing film soundtracks. Highlights include several songs from the films of Chicago screenwriter–director John Hughes (including "Weird Romance" from the Weird Science soundtrack, and "Holiday Road" by Lindsey Buckingham from National Lampoon's Vacation), "We Close Our Eyes" by Susanna Hoffs from the 1992 Buffy the Vampire Slayer movie soundtrack, "The Show Goes On" by Bruce Hornsby from the 1991 Chicago action film Backdraft, the haunted lullaby "Dream Little One, Dream" from Charles Laughton's 1955 Night of the Hunter, "It's Magic" by Doris Day, and a tribute to The Godfather composer Nino Rota called "Rocco and His Brothers" by Mi Loco Tango.

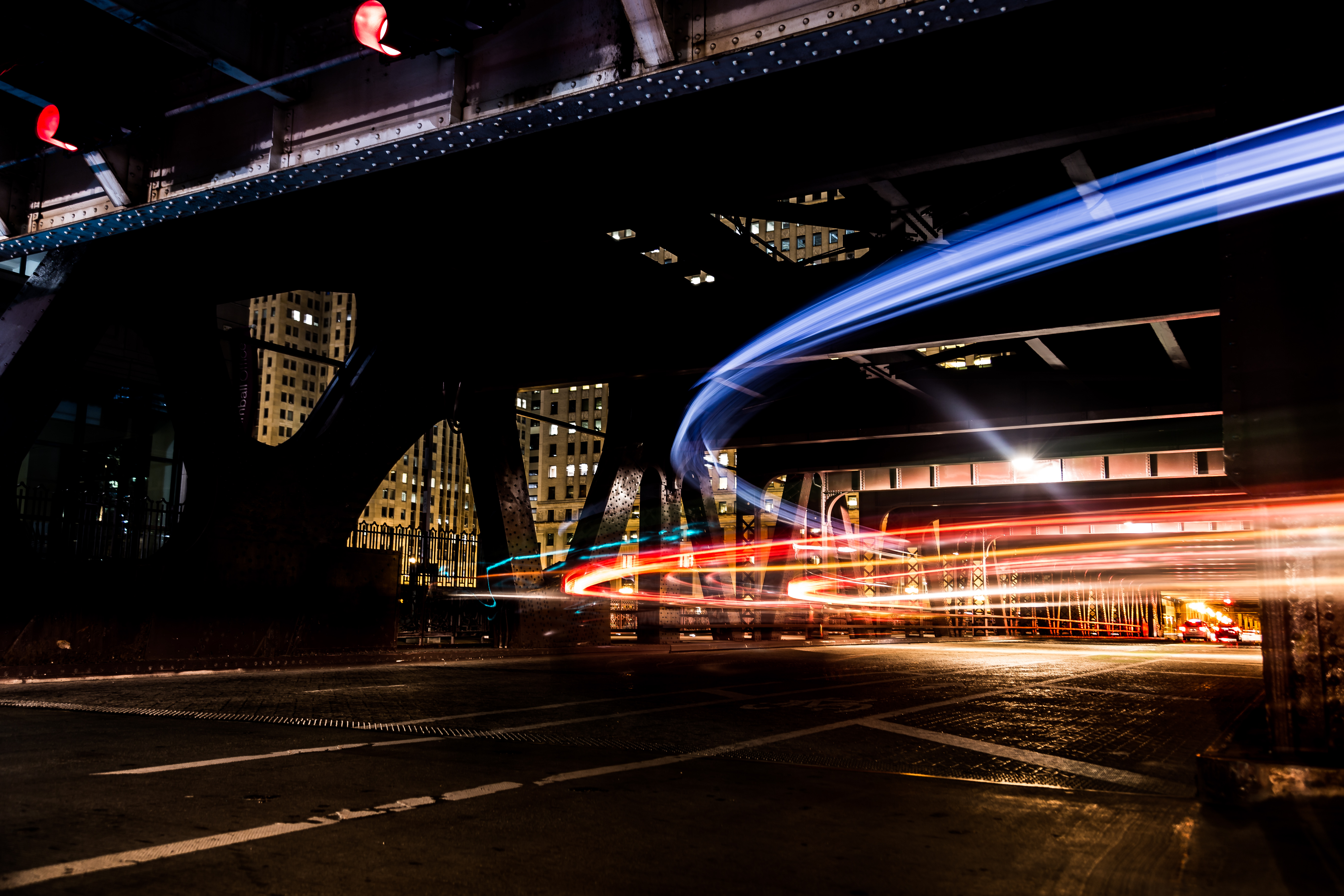
Street traffic at night, River North

In "Forks," Richie gets "Diamond Diary" by Tangerine Dream from the soundtrack to Thief, a 1981 Michael Mann-directed Chicago crime picture. One music writer described the song as a "synth-hysteria delivery system shot through an '80s pastel skydance. Storer cleverly informs us that The Bear should be considered in that strong visual aesthetic grouping Mann has perfected in his career. And dammit, Storer may be right." "Diamond Diary" reprises in "Forever" and "Groundhogs" and becomes a de facto Richie's theme at moments of forward progress. Season 1's "Brigade" uses Tangerine Dream's "The Dream Is Always the Same" and the season 3 teaser trailer music is "Love on a Real Train," both from the soundtrack of the 1983 Chicago comedy Risky Business.

== Season 5 ==
The teaser trailer music for season 5 is "The Promise of Adam" by Wisconsin rock band Sunblind Lion. The trailer music for season 5 is "Love Reign o'er Me" by the Who." The season 5 score has 17 tracks written by Christian Lundberg of Bleeding Fingers Music, inspired by themes of "ambition, family, resilience, and the bonds that hold people together," produced by Hans Zimmer. Vulture argued that the Lundberg score abandoned the show's "sound." Roger Ebert called the score "propulsive electronic." The Independent review of season 5 criticized the show as "one of the best things on TV," which had nonetheless alienated viewers with "self-serious" creative choices, for instance, foregoing "its expertly curated jukebox in favour of a more generic, tension-building score."

Lundberg told the Go See Talk podcast that in electronically creating a score for season 5, his "Yuma rack" served as an orchestra, and "my Juno 60 was heavily, heavily used," along with an Osmose "MIDI keyboard on steroids." The "Honey" track for episode 7 "Caramel," on which Lundberg plays acoustic guitar and Charlie Bisharat's violins feature prominently, was a Friday night collaboration. Bisharat grabbed his instruments and drove down to Lundberg's studio to work: "We had the melody...by ear, we did a chord chart, really quickly, and within two hours we had that track."

== Other notable ==
Among the many other songs and musicians featured in the series are Radiohead, whose "Let Down" ends season 1; the Counting Crows, including two versions of "Have You Seen Me Lately?", and "A Murder of One," with the lyrics out of order; 1960s girl group the Ronettes, featuring Ronnie Spector; and "if nothing else, The Bear season 3 delivered unto a broken world Olivia Colman boogieing" to Laid by James.

== See also ==
- The Bear season 1 § Music
- The Bear season 2 § Music
- The Bear season 3 § Music
- The Bear season 4 § Music
- The Bear season 5 § Music
- Gary (The Bear episode) § Music
- The Five Heartbeats – 1991 musical film costarring Robert Townsend (Syd's dad) and Harry Lennix (Marcus' dad)

== Sources ==
- Battaglia, Debbora (Spring 2001). "Multiplicities: An Anthropologist's Thoughts on Replicants and Clones in Popular Film". Critical Inquiry. 27 (3): 493–514. doi:10.1086/449018. ISSN 0093-1896. JSTOR 1344218.
- Nikolova, Zlatina (July 2025). "'Every second counts': Urban affect and culinary chaos in The Bear". The Journal of Popular Television. 13 (1). Bristol, UK: 43–59. doi:10.1386/jptv_00135_1. ISSN 2046-9861. OCLC 870687508 – via Intellect Discover.
- Fallon, Jordan (2026). "'Every Second Counts' The Bear's Culinary Musicality and Confused Temporality". In Niewiadomska-Flis, Urszula; Tippen, Carrie Helms (eds.). Food and American TV: Constructing Identity in Bite-Sized Narratives. Routledge Food Studies. London: Routledge. pp. 137–152. doi:10.4324/9781003672173. ISBN 978-1-041-13920-1. LCCN 2025053137. OCLC 1578998345.
- Hage, Erik (2009). The Words and Music of Van Morrison. The Praeger Singer-Songwriter Collection. Westport, Connecticut: Greenwood. ISBN 978-0-313-35863-0. LCCN 2008051375. OCLC 562250481.
- Martynuska, Małgorzata (February 2026). "'Every Second Counts': Representing Chicago's Urban Identity in the TV Series The Bear". Perspektywy Kultury. 53 (2). Kraków: Ignatianum University in Cracow: 75–91. ISSN 2081-1446.
- Wandler, Steven (Spring 2019). "Groundhog Day and the Fiction of Perfection". Studies in Popular Culture. 41 (2): 25–44. ISSN 0888-5753. JSTOR 26644418.
