= Koney King =

Diner in Gary, Indiana, United States

Coordinates: 41°32′05″N 87°20′09″W

Koney King is a diner-style restaurant in Gary, Indiana, United States, founded in 1920. They specialize in "Coney dogs, a Midwestern diner classic in which a hot dog is topped with chili, chopped onions, and yellow mustard."

== History ==
Koney King was originally a lunch counter established by Mike Petroff, who emigrated to the United States from Rodina, Bulgaria, in 1914, and first found work at the quarries in Thornton, Illinois. He and his friend started their restaurant in an alley west of Broadway on 9th Avenue in 1920. During the Great Depression, Coney Island Lunch offered "hot dogs for a nickel, chili for a dime, and sometimes food for free." The shop later moved locations but was otherwise carried forward by his descendants into the 21st century.

One of Petroff's heirs sold out to local entrepreneur Jimmy Hendricks in 2018. Hendricks told the Chicago Tribune that he "first ate at the counter as a Lew Wallace High School freshman in the 1990s, and eventually rented out the barbershop [next door]. He became the barber to Petroff's great nephew, Paul Kamanaroff, and a friendship was formed. When Kamanaroff's retirement came in 2018, he sold the restaurant and building to Hendricks under a couple of conditions—one being that Hendricks would learn the art of chili making and the secret recipe from Kamanaroff."

In 2026, the diner was the setting for a scene in "Gary," a special episode of the FX on Hulu series The Bear. Hendricks told the The Times of Northwest Indiana, "[The Bear] reached out to us to provide for them to use an old diner, nostalgia type of environment. Koney King fit the bill." Elisha Evans, who has worked at Koney King for seven years, was featured in a one-take unscripted scene with stars Jon Bernthal and Ebon Moss-Bachrach. Moss-Bachrach's character, Richie, noticed the Teddy Pendergrass song, "When Somebody Love You Back," was playing at Koney King by happenstance. Moss-Bachrach recognized the song, and commented, "Romantic hot-dog place you've got here."
