= Gary (The Bear) =

Gary (The Bear) may refer to:

- Gary "Sweeps" Woods, a recurring character on The Bear played by Corey Hendrix
- "Gary" (The Bear episode), a 2026 surprise special episode of the American TV show
