= Richie Jerimovich =

Fictional character, The Bear TV series

- The Bear character
- First appearance: "System"; June 23, 2022
- Last appearance: "The Original Beef of Chicagoland"; June 25, 2026
- Created by: Christopher Storer
- Portrayed by: Ebon Moss-Bachrach

In-universe information
- Full name: Richard Lawrence Jerimovich
- Occupation: public relations; human resources; customer experience department lead; song and dance man; international businessman
- Family: Tiffany Jerimovich (ex-wife)
- Children: Eva Jerimovich

Richard Lawrence Jerimovich is a fictional character on the FX Network television series The Bear, created by Christopher Storer and played by Ebon Moss-Bachrach. Richie is referred to as "cousin," is the longtime best friend of Michael Berzatto, and was unofficially adopted by the Berzatto family long before the events of The Bear begin. Richie was an assistant manager of the Original Beef of Chicagoland sandwich shop until Mikey Berzatto (Jon Bernthal), killed himself. In his will, Mikey bequeathed the restaurant to his younger brother, Carmy Berzatto (Jeremy Allen White), who left home to further his culinary career after Mikey shunned him and blockaded him from working at the restaurant. Carmy returned to Chicago after many years of absence as an exquisitely trained and nationally acclaimed elite chef, took over the restaurant and sought to reform it in into a respectable place of business, much to the dismay of Richie. In addition to the workplace upheaval wrought by Carmy's reforms, Richie simultaneously struggles with a number of personal issues, first among them his recent divorce from Tiffany (Gillian Jacobs), with whom he shares a daughter, Eva. Moss-Bachrach reprised his role in "Gary," which he co-wrote with Bernthal.

Moss-Bachrach has been nominated for three Emmys and won twice for his portrayal of Richie.

== Casting ==
Moss-Bachrach originally declined because he was consumed with shooting Andor, but per casting director Jeanie Bacharach, "We circled back to him...We caught him at a time where his schedule and things had cleared enough that he could open his mind to it." Moss-Bachrach said his agents encouraged him to take a second look at the scripts and he ended up doing a "Skype audition with Jeremy" from London, and the profane yelling somewhat distracted from his daughter's parallel Zoom school meeting in the next room.

== Biography ==
In the episode "Beef," Richie tells Carmy that he is 45 years old, so he was born in about 1978. As Mikey's best friend, Richie spent so much of his childhood at the Berzatto house that he essentially became a part of the family. Per Moss-Bachrach, "I don't think his parents were really in the picture...Mike was very much his anchor and made sure Richie got fed—three square meals a day, probably since the time they were six and eight years old." Richie told Chef Terry in season two that his biological father was a staff sergeant in the U.S. military at one time. Matriarch Donna Berzatto (Jamie Lee Curtis) was so involved in Richie's upbringing that she threw one of his birthday parties.

Richie is a DeVry Technical Institute dropout. Both Mikey and Richie ended up working at, and eventually running, the Original Beef of Chicagoland restaurant, an Italian beef sandwich shop in the River North neighborhood that had originally been purchased and managed by the unnamed Berzatto dad. Following Mikey's suicide, the Richie introduced in season 1 is a man still deep in grief, which he is medicating with, in the words of Moss-Bachrach, "Bacardi and nachos." Moss-Bachrach told Entertainment Weekly of season 1 Richie, "He's very, very lost and very, very sad, and fighting desperately to keep his place in the only home he really has. The desperation motivates so much of that behavior." Storer told an interviewer in 2022 that:

Richie is a character really dealing with what life is like without not only his boss, but his best friend. And you multiply that by the fact that there is a smaller version of his best friend, Carmy, fighting with him all day long. You see that Richie's this guy that's facing what the world is like 10 years too late, after he has been cooped up in this restaurant.

In season 1 in particular, "Richie voices his disapproval [of the changing restaurant] not only verbally but also in practice by ignoring Carmy or sabotaging Carmy's equipment. His behavior is particularly pronounced in the pilot episode, as Richie hides Carmy's knife under the dirty sink, causing Carmy to withdraw from reality and think of his deceased brother. Whereas Carmy is fueled by the belief in saving the sandwich shop, Richie is fueled by the desire to keep everything the same. Led by feelings of nostalgia and memories, and the fear of leaving his comfort zone, the sandwich shop symbolizes not only his connection to the late Michael but also to his Chicagoan neighborhood. Furthermore, Richie stands out as the sole character who notices the neighborhood undergoing change and voices his agitation. He is left unheard." Simultaneously, Richie "an unmotivated white, male, vulgar, and antagonistic character intra-acts with Sydney, a determined, Black, female, thoughtful, and generous character. Richie is Sydney's foil. Richie's history working at the show's restaurant, The Beef, is extensive and Sydney is the newcomer." He sexually harasses and bullies her, she stabs him, and eventually they develop a close, trusting, and mutually beneficial friendship.

Along the way Richie married Tiff, and together they had daughter Eva (Annabelle Toomey); the couple divorced not long before the opening episode of the series. Richie seems to have struggled with maintaining a consistent income during the course of the marriage. In 2024, Gillian Jacobs told The Hollywood Reporter her impression of the Jerimovich marriage after reading the "Fishes" script:

"Richie has gone through a really hard time and he's in grief. He's mourning the loss of his best friend in Mikey, who is almost equal to a romantic partner in terms of importance in his life and to his identity. And you saw this in 'Fishes,' but I could have guessed too, that there's a lot of stuff between Tiffany and Richie around jobs and career. He's not being honest about what’s going on. Once I read that in the script it made total sense to me; especially knowing they were going to have a kid and her wanting to feel like she knows what's going on with him, of course there would be conflict around that dishonesty."

After staging for a week at Ever, Richie finds purpose and puts his natural charm to work in service of the Bear, although his "articulative style remains grounded authentically in his localist milieu rather than reproducing the typical formalities of hospitality best practices. Richie's creative synthesis and unwillingness (or inability?) to give up key facets of his personality (despite many warnings from Garrett throughout the episode, Richie never stops cursing, for instance) endows him with a durable form of vitality and helps to form a different kind of culinary subject."

Despite strife between him and Carmy, Richie anchors the Bear as front-of-house manager, and by season four, while he is "still prone to dramatic self-flagellation, Richie finally seems like a full-fledged adult...[with] pain and self-doubt right at the surface but [also] a layer of wisdom." Richie creates his own list of non-negotiables as a counter to Carmy's list:

- A courtesy window for any menu changes. Eight hours is OK. 10 hours is ideal.
- Trim nails.
- A willingness to accommodate dietary restrictions.
- Joy.
- Open heart, open mind.
- Basic manners and decency.
- An environment that embraces and encourages razzle-dazzle and the dream weave.

Richie is responsible for hiring three experienced restaurant employees from the shuttered Ever to shore up the staff of the Bear: Rene (Rene Gube), Garrett (Andrew Lopez), and Chef Jess (Sarah Ramos).

Richie's apartment may be in Ukrainian Village. The bar that Richie visits in "Soubise" is J&M Tap on Leavitt Street, which is an "under-the-radar Ukrainian Village gem with a jukebox, cheap drinks, and a laidback vibe."

== Relationships ==
When Carmy Berzatto returned to Chicago to take over the restaurant, he and Richie immediately settled back into sibling-like squabbling. Richie is introduced as a "lovable brute who cosplays as an Italian" and gets into fights with the staff.

Richie has been described as the "most damaged, the most broken, and the most aimless [character], a miasma of resentment and condescension yelling about a changing restaurant in a changing neighborhood to hide his fear." Carmy is often frustrated and angered by Richie's antics, but also accepts him as the surviving relic of his brother, such that they often share cigarettes and memories of Mikey. Carmy eventually empties the restaurant's cash reserve to bail out Richie after a head punch leads to the injury of a patron, resulting in assault charges and a night in jail. For his part, Richie occasionally softens long enough to reveal affection for the 32 year old Carmy, and to reveal a vulnerable weariness and a self-aware sense of shame about the consequences of his choices.

In season two, Carmy sent Richie to stage in the front of house at a fictionalized Ever, a legendary three-Michelin star Chicago restaurant where Carmy had once been chef de cuisine to executive chef Andrea Terry (Olivia Colman). Moss-Bachrach characterized the filming of the episode as a little "lonely" and the Ever set design as "cold" compared to setting of the cozier, more familiar Bear. When Richie shares his belief Carmy sent him there to fail and embarrass himself, Terry tells Richie that she agreed to host him because Carmy testified that "he's good with people," with which she agreed. Richie returns to the Bear with a newfound respect for the restaurant business generally and although he communicates this to Carmy, he continues to persist in his accusation that Carmy wanted him to fail and be humiliated. In contrast, he announces his new attitude to Natalie and apologizes for his previous boorishness.

This détente between the rivals lasted but two episodes before a minor kitchen crisis resulted in a Carmy breakdown. Richie saved the day by doing expo for Sydney, but his concern for Carmy's then-girlfriend Dr. Claire Dunlap (Molly Gordon), who ended the night in tears, fuels a brutal and emotionally scarring argument between Carmy and Richie that in turn fuels an extended estrangement, which lasts through the summer. The fight, argued at maximum volume and maximum vitriol from opposite sides of a locked steel door, has been described as "mutually assured destruction with the red buttons getting smashed by each side."

Richie never apologized for his part in the debacle; in the opinion of one Collider writer, "Saying something so purposely hurtful to Carmy in the heat of the moment was one thing, but refusing to acknowledge it or own up to it was worse." The animosity between the cousins shaped their behavior for the better part of season 3: "Carmy is only concerned about his own goals and form of atonement...Richie is only concerned about how much Carmy hurt him, and doesn't seem to consider that when he wastes time causing a scene in the kitchen during service, or he tosses snide digs and picks fights, he is only hurting the restaurant and its employees. At their core, they are each just hurt and angry at each other, and that fuels their respective forms of punishment."

All this came to a head in the season-4 finale, "Goodbye," when Carmy's bad communication and apparent retirement from restaurants triggered a ferocious conflict between, first, him and Sydney, and then, second, a seemingly more cathartic and confessional discourse between him and Richie. The dialogue and emotion of "Goodbye" has been described as "the conversational equivalent of a thunderstorm that brings a merciful, if furious, end to a heat wave." A post-season 4/pre-season 5 episode titled "Gary," however, shed a different light on the final conversation between the two. In "Goodbye," Richie makes mention of a road trip with Mike to Gary, Indiana, and describes it as one of the best days he and Mike enjoyed together, and he talks how he was thinking about Carmen on the drive along the lakeshore, and imagining his life must also be as good. The events actually depicted the "Gary" episode showed, to the contrary, a simmering, ever-increasing hostility between Mike and Richie that resulted in an agonizing confrontation, represented visually by the scorched earth of a burning field in the vicinity of the town. After Mike resisted Richie's pressure to go into a bar for day drinking, Richie sent out an attractive woman to lure him in. Later, as Richie was holding sway over the bar's patrons, Mike accused him of being a coward—the same accusation Carmy made in the finale of season 2, and said Richie was going to screw up his own kid's life.

== Family ==
Eva "Evie" Jerimovich was born on January 12, 2019, according to the timeline presented in "Fishes," "Legacy," and "Gary." Scriptwriters Bernthal and Moss-Bachrach used Mikey giving Richie's daughter her name in "Gary" as a way of "having a continuum, and a lineage" in the family.

Richie is a devoted father to Evie, and he and ex-wife work together effectively as loving co-parents. He calls Evie żabka, which is a Polish language endearment meaning little frog.

Evie loves Taylor Swift, and one of her CDs is on permanent rotation in Richie's aging Honda Accord. Richie leans on Uncle Jimmy for Taylor Swift concert tickets, sings along to "Love Story" at an emotional high point in the saga, and Taylor's version of "Style" plays quietly in the background during a quiet moment between father and daughter on the day of Tiff's remarriage.

Richie struggles mightily with the prospect of Tiffany's engagement and he resists the wedding. The season four episode "Bears" centers on Tiff's wedding to second husband Frank (Josh Hartnett), resulting in some level of romantic catharsis for Richie and an opportunity for the entire extended family-by-choice to gather for a happy but typically chaotic event. Evie's emotions, about her mom's remarriage, her dog Jonathan who died three years ago, and dancing, are the centerpiece of "Bears," which "brings the main and not-so-main characters together under a long banquet table, where they gather, one by one, to soothe the nerves of the confused little girl—the daughter of the bride—who's been hiding there. The cousins and friends create a protected, secret world, there under the tent of the white tablecloth, not just for her but for themselves. They're all children sitting cross-legged under a fort someone's mom set up in the living room with an old sheet draped over a few chairs. Then they're ready to face the world again."

Jerimovich (biological)	"Aunt DD" (unofficial mom)
Richard Lawrence Jerimovich (b. c. 1978) (div. ≤2022)	Tiffany	Frank "Waldo"
Eva Jerimovich "Żabka" b. 2019

== Other attributes ==
Richie is a huge aficionado of science fiction across all media (books, film, etc.), with a specific interest in the works of Philip K. Dick. When Richie tells Carmy about his struggles finding purpose, he recounts the plot of a book he has been reading. The book is probably Colorless Tsukuru Tazaki and His Years of Pilgrimage (Japanese: 色彩を持たない多崎つくると、彼の巡礼の年, 2013) by Haruki Murakami (村上 春樹). He also quotes the mathematician Jacob Bronowski, Hermann Hesse's Siddhartha, and Ninja: 1,000 Years of the Shadow Warrior. According to Moss-Bachrach, Richie favors "hard sci-fi," including Dick, Iain Banks, Kim Stanley Robinson, and "He likes the deep stuff, the world-building. Probably Foundation." He calls Carmy a "baby replicant who's not self-actualized" and quotes Dick's A Scanner Darkly to Sydney. Before crawling alone, and a little drunk, into "his sad little twin-size bed" in "Soubise," he knocks over a photo of six people (including himself) that sits on a book shelf full of Robert A. Heinlein, Philip K. Dick, Haruki Murakami, and a copy of The Silmarillion.

Richie deploys "SnyderCut" disparagingly, and per Moss-Bachrach, "I don't think he's into Marvel stuff." According to set decorator Eric Frankel, "You can't see it but in Richie's apartment, every book on the shelf is 'Ridley Scott'," and they wanted to put a Legend poster in his apartment but licensing problems made it unworkable. Richie is a fan of William Friedkin and this inspires him to tape up a photo of the "philosopher's path" at a Zen garden in Kyoto in the office of Bear restaurant. Film director William Friedkin talks about his visit to Ryōan-ji temple in Kyoto in the 2019 documentary Leap of Faith: William Friedkin on the Exorcist. He has a copy of F. X. Feeney's 2006 Michael Mann book on his desk in the Bear office, worries about water damage to a Heat poster in the basement, and makes references to Mann's Miami Vice, and references other action movies including The Last Boy Scout, Bloodsport, and The Karate Kid. He has Ridley Scott posters on the walls of his apartment, talks to Ebra about Scott's Black Hawk Down starring Josh Harnett (who plays Tiffany's second husband Frank), and quotes from Scott's Gladiator starring Russell Crowe ("on my signal, unleash hell").

According to Chris Storer, "Richie was either at the Monster tour or Rage and Wu-Tang at the Rosemont." Moss-Bachrach is an accomplished singer and guitarist who has performed in character in the HBO series Girls and the AMC series NOS4A2. In addition to car singing Taylor Swift, Richie sings fragments of the arias "Una furtiva lagrima" from L'elisir d'amore by Gaetano Donizetti and "Largo al factotum" from The Barber of Seville by Gioachino Rossini, the Spanish-language happy birthday song ("¡Feliz cumpleaños a ti!") in season 3, and a couple of lines from "The 3:10 to Yuma" (1957) in season 4.

His butt-cheek "piss Calvin" tattoo is revealed after Sydney stabs him in the butt in "Review." In season one, Richie wears "branded T-shirts, long sleeves, and baseball raglans are all part of his wardrobe, along with a wedding ring that's a vestige of his broken marriage." GQ described his key season one costume elements as "Adidas high-tops, wonderfully swishy track pants, and [a] black Members Only jacket you could spend a lifetime thrifting for." Following a makeover by the Ever glam squad, Richie starts wearing suits. In the series finale, Richie wears an Adidas Firebird jacket on his international flight to Japan.

Richie may or may not be a practicing Roman Catholic but nonetheless he speaks out a prayer at the beginning of season 4. Unlike Carmy, Richie is charming, quick-witted, and funny. Show creator Storer has cited his friend Christopher Zucchero as an element of the inspiration for the character of Richie. Richie uses a lot of Italian-American slang, some of which Moss-Bachrach gets from a Teamster friend he met on a movie job he had years before The Bear.

== See also ==
- List of The Bear characters
- List of The Bear episodes
- Food of The Bear
- Music on The Bear
- Family on The Bear
- The Punisher season 1

== Sources ==
- Fallon, Jordan (2026). "'Every Second Counts' The Bear's Culinary Musicality and Confused Temporality". In Niewiadomska-Flis, Urszula; Tippen, Carrie Helms (eds.). Food and American TV: Constructing Identity in Bite-Sized Narratives. Routledge Food Studies. London: Routledge. pp. 137–152. doi:10.4324/9781003672173. ISBN 978-1-041-13920-1. LCCN 2025053137. OCLC 1578998345.
- Franklin-Phipps, Asilia; Varga, Bretton A. (Fall 2024). "Bear(ing) Down: Encountering Posthuman Critical Media Studies through the (Re)tracing of Object and Embodiment". Journal of Posthumanism. 4 (3): 205–216. doi:10.33182/joph.v4i3.3290. ISSN 2634-3584.
- Vi, Kieu Jenny (Summer 2025). "Cooking Up Change: Food and Gentrification in The Bear (2022—)". In Progress: A Graduate Journal of North American Studies. 3 (1). Technische Informationsbibliothek (TIB). Hanover, Germany: Leibniz Universität Hannover: 105–119. doi:10.15488/19952.
