= Adventures in the Sin Bin =

- Directed by: Billy Federighi
- Written by: Christopher Storer
- Produced by: Billy Federighi; Dante Federighi; Gary Giudice; Brian Petsos; Christopher Storer
- Starring: Michael Seater; Bo Burnham; Gillian Jacobs; Tim Blake Nelson; Emily Meade; Jeff Garlin
- Cinematography: Seaumus Tierney
- Edited by: Craig Lewandowski
- Music by: Jon Sadoff
- Production company: Moviola
- Distributed by: Phase 4 Films
- Release dates: June 2012 (Seattle); October 18, 2013
- Running time: 101 minutes
- Country: United States
- Language: English

Adventures in the Sin Bin is a 2012 American adventure comedy-drama film written by Christopher Storer, directed by Billy Federighi and starring Michael Seater, Bo Burnham, Gillian Jacobs, Tim Blake Nelson, Emily Meade and Jeff Garlin.

== Cast ==
- Michael Seater as Brian
- Emily Meade as Suzie
- Bo Burnham as Tony
- Brian Petsos as Benny
- Gillian Jacobs as Lauren
- Ben McKenzie as Michael
- Jeff Garlin as Dean Theatard
- Tim Blake Nelson as Totsch

== Release ==
In June 2013, it was announced that Phase 4 Films acquired U.S. and Canadian distribution rights to the film, which premiered at the Seattle International Film Festival in 2012. The film was released in theaters and on demand on October 18, 2013.

== Reception ==
The Hollywood Reporter gave the film a positive review, calling it "Heavily dependent on Wes Anderson's aesthetic but charming nonetheless."
