= Sunblind Lion =

American rock band

Sunblind Lion was an American six-person rock band that formed in Plymouth near Sheboygan, Wisconsin in 1974. The members of the band were Duane Abler, Keith Abler, Larry Baldock, Michael Dellger, Dave Steffen, and Steve Olschesky. They were "an outgrowth" of an earlier band called the Love Society. They released four albums, Observer, Above & Beyond, Live Lion, and The Sanitorium. Above & Beyond was a Billboard recommended LP in 1979. They toured the Midwest in the 1970s, typically as an opening act for groups like Blue Öyster Cult, Boston, Jethro Tull, Rush, REO Speedwagon, and Styx. In 1976, a Green Bay music writer described them as "another concept outfit (dealing with the survival of the earth) [that] got a standing ovation. [Sunblind Lion] showed a broader scope than the other bands and delved into more styles."

"The Promise of Adam" (originally the fourth track on the 1978 Above & Beyond record, with another version released on 2016's Live Lion, Vol. II) was used in the teaser trailer for season 5 of the American FX on Hulu TV series The Bear.
