= Fishes (The Bear) =

- The Bear episode
- Episode no.: Season 2 Episode 6
- Directed by: Christopher Storer
- Written by: Joanna Calo; Christopher Storer
- Cinematography by: Andrew Wehde
- Editing by: Joanna Naugle
- Production code: XCBV2006
- Original release date: June 22, 2023
- Running time: 66 minutes

Guest appearances
- Jon Bernthal as Michael Berzatto; Jamie Lee Curtis as Donna Berzatto; Bob Odenkirk as Uncle Lee; Oliver Platt as Uncle Jimmy; Gillian Jacobs as Tiffany Jerimovich; John Mulaney as Stevie; Sarah Paulson as Cousin Michelle; Ricky Staffieri as Theodore Fak; Chris Witaske as Pete; Maura Kidwell as Carol

Episode chronology
← Previous "Pop"	Next → "Forks"
- The Bear season 2

"Fishes" (titled "The Berzattos" on-screen) is the sixth episode of the second season and 14th episode overall of the American comedy-drama series The Bear. With the rest of the second season, it was released on June 22, 2023, on Hulu. It was directed by series creator Christopher Storer, who wrote the script with Joanna Calo.

The episode notably features numerous high-profile guest stars, most of whom were not announced as part of the cast prior to the season's release. At the 76th Primetime Emmy Awards, "Fishes" gained nine nominations, winning four, including Outstanding Guest Actor for Jon Bernthal and Outstanding Guest Actress for Jamie Lee Curtis.

== Plot ==
Approximately five years (Note: The episode opens with a card reading "256 weeks to open".) before The Bear is set to open, Carmy returns from Copenhagen to spend Christmas with his family and friends. Present at the Berzatto household are Carmy's mother Donna, his siblings Michael and Natalie, his cousin Michelle and her boyfriend Stevie, Richie and his pregnant wife Tiffany, the Fak brothers Neil and Theodore, Uncle Cicero, and Donna's on-and-off boyfriend Lee. Michael and Carmy warn Natalie not to keep asking their mother Donna, a temperamental alcoholic, if she is "okay."

Donna drunkenly prepares a meal based on the Feast of the Seven Fishes, even though Carmy claims no one ever eats it. Michael, Richie, and Stevie tell Carmy that they recently ran into Claire, his childhood crush, and "put in a good word for him." Carmy and Michael later have a moment together where Michael reassures his brother that he genuinely wants the best for him. Carmy gives Michael a framed sketch of The Bear restaurant that he wants to open with his brother. (Note: This same sketch is in the pilot episode at 14:52.) Michael is moved by the gift, but displays mental distress the moment Carmy leaves the room.

Richie tends to Tiffany in Donna's bedroom, and the two share a delicate moment discussing their upcoming parenthood. Richie then asks Cicero for a job to help support his child, which Cicero later grants him after Tiffany unwittingly thanks him for the job. Michael entertains the group with a travel story, but Lee cuts him off, chastising him for repeating the same stories to everyone while failing to follow through on any of his business ventures. Natalie's boyfriend Pete arrives with an additional seafood dish that he playfully dubs "the eighth fish" to the group. This infuriates the Berzatto siblings, who remind him that an eighth fish is a symbol of bad luck and will send Donna into a tailspin. Natalie hastily trashes the food before Donna can see it. Michelle encourages Carmy to stay with her in New York to pursue his career, noticing how the dysfunction in his family weighs on him.

While the rest of the group awaits dinner, Carmy tends to his mother in the kitchen; Donna laments the effort she makes for her family while saying she receives little appreciation in return. Carmy attempts to comfort her, only for Donna to admonish him to return to the table. Donna begins crying to herself as soon as Carmy leaves. At the dinner table, the family debates the origin of the Seven Fishes tradition. Lee offers his interpretation, but an intoxicated Michael repeatedly throws forks at him. The tension between the two mounts until Donna finally joins the table. Stevie says a heartfelt, impromptu grace calling for the family to be kinder to one another, after which Donna breaks down. Despite being explicitly told not to, Natalie asks Donna if she is okay, much to the visible chagrin of everyone in the room. Donna berates Natalie for asking and has a profane outburst at the family before leaving the room. Michael throws another fork at Lee when he scorns Donna's behavior and a fight nearly occurs, only to be interrupted by Donna crashing her car into the living room as Carmy and Natalie stare in shock.

== Cast ==
=== Main ===
- Jeremy Allen White as Carmen "Carmy" Berzatto
- Ebon Moss-Bachrach as Richard "Richie" Jerimovich
- Abby Elliott as Natalie "Sugar" Rose Berzatto
- Matty Matheson as Neil Fak

Main cast members Ayo Edebiri, Lionel Boyce, and Liza Colón-Zayas are credited as usual in this episode, but do not appear. Edebiri shadowed Storer in anticipation of directing an episode of season three, and is credited onscreen as a co-executive producer of the episode.

=== Guest appearances ===
- Oliver Platt as Uncle Jimmy "Cicero" Kalinowski
- Jamie Lee Curtis as Donna Berzatto
- Gillian Jacobs as Tiffany Jerimovich
- John Mulaney as Stevie
- Bob Odenkirk as "Uncle" Lee Lane
- Sarah Paulson as Cousin Michelle Berzatto
- Ricky Staffieri as Theodore Fak
- Chris Witaske as Pete
- Jon Bernthal as Michael Berzatto
- Maura Kidwell as Carol

== Production ==
=== Development ===
The episode was directed by series creator Christopher Storer and written by Joanna Calo and Storer. It was Calo's fourth writing credit, and Storer's eighth directing credit. According to Calo, there was a discussion about releasing it separately "as a Christmas special because I think there's something so funny about adding that to your Christmas list."

=== Writing ===
Stevie and the Faks discuss "ROI on RBIs" and collectible baseball cards. Although "many of Neil and Teddy's scenes seem like improvised riffing, Matheson insists it is all pre-written by Storer and his team," but the baseball bit was a rare exception. Matheson recounted to Rolling Stone in 2025, "We were like, 'Yo, what if we just started pitching every character to get in on our baseball hustle?' Chris loved it, and it turned into a bit...A lot of that is Ricky [Staffieri]. He changed my life."

=== Casting ===
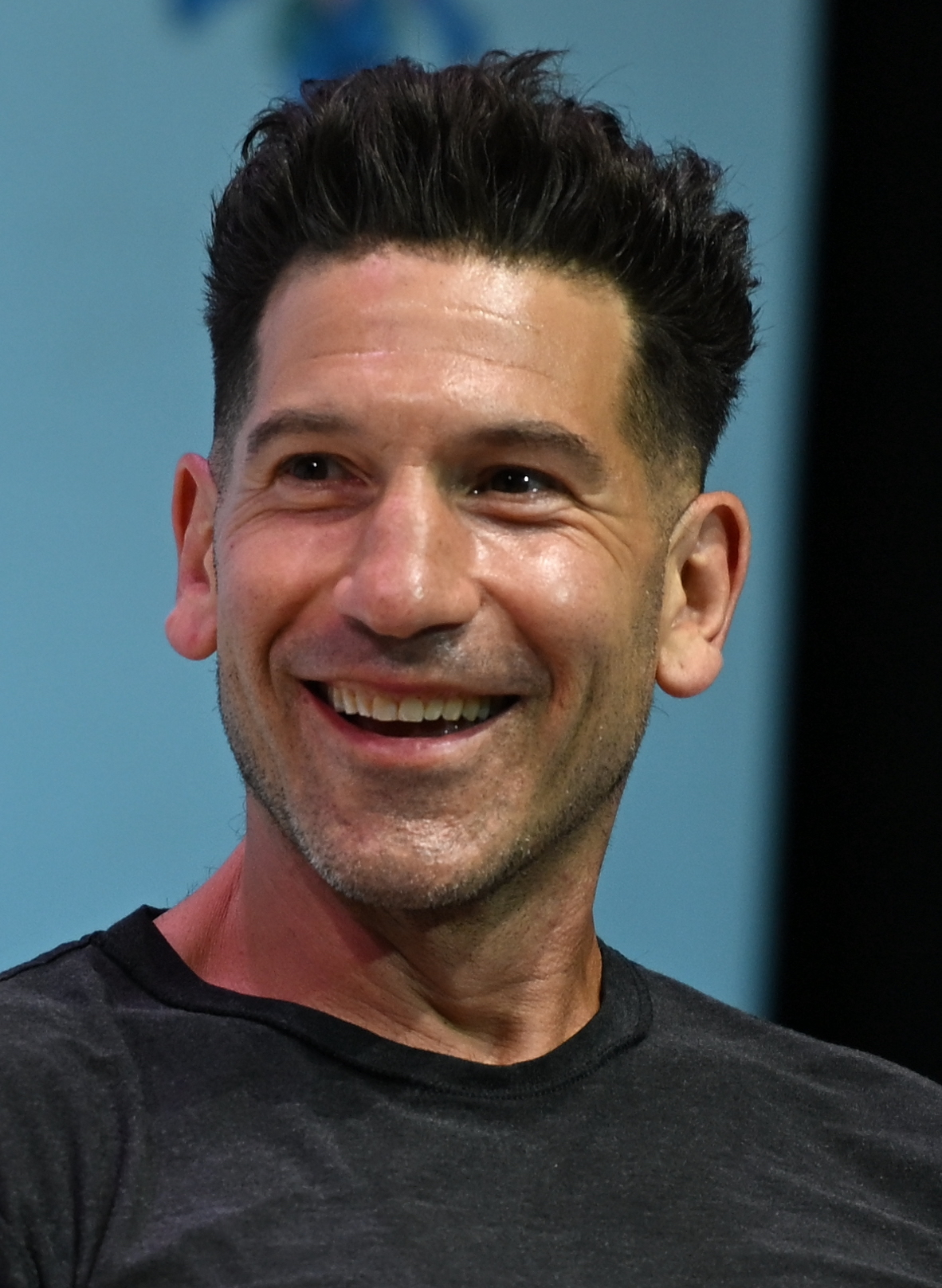
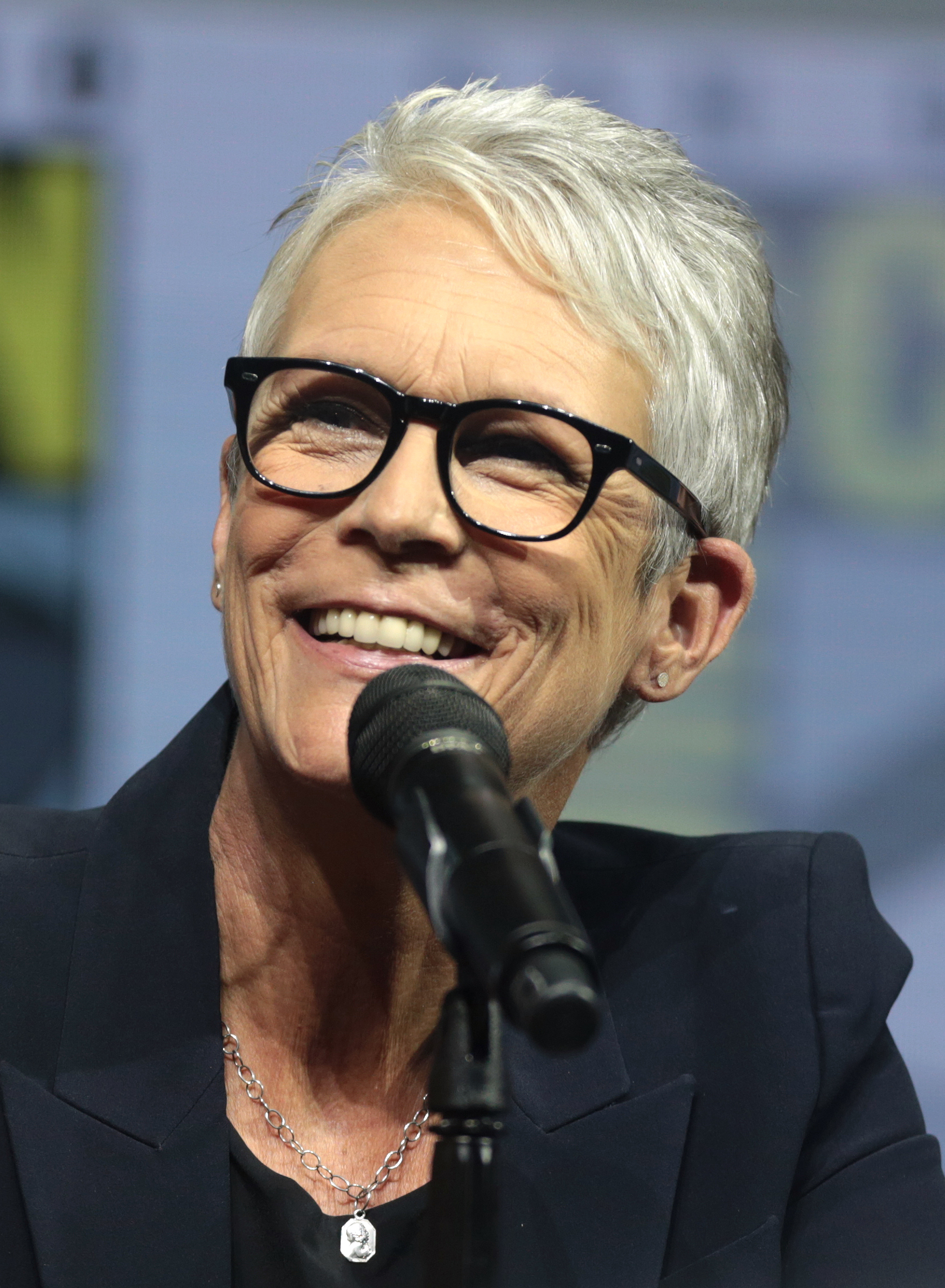
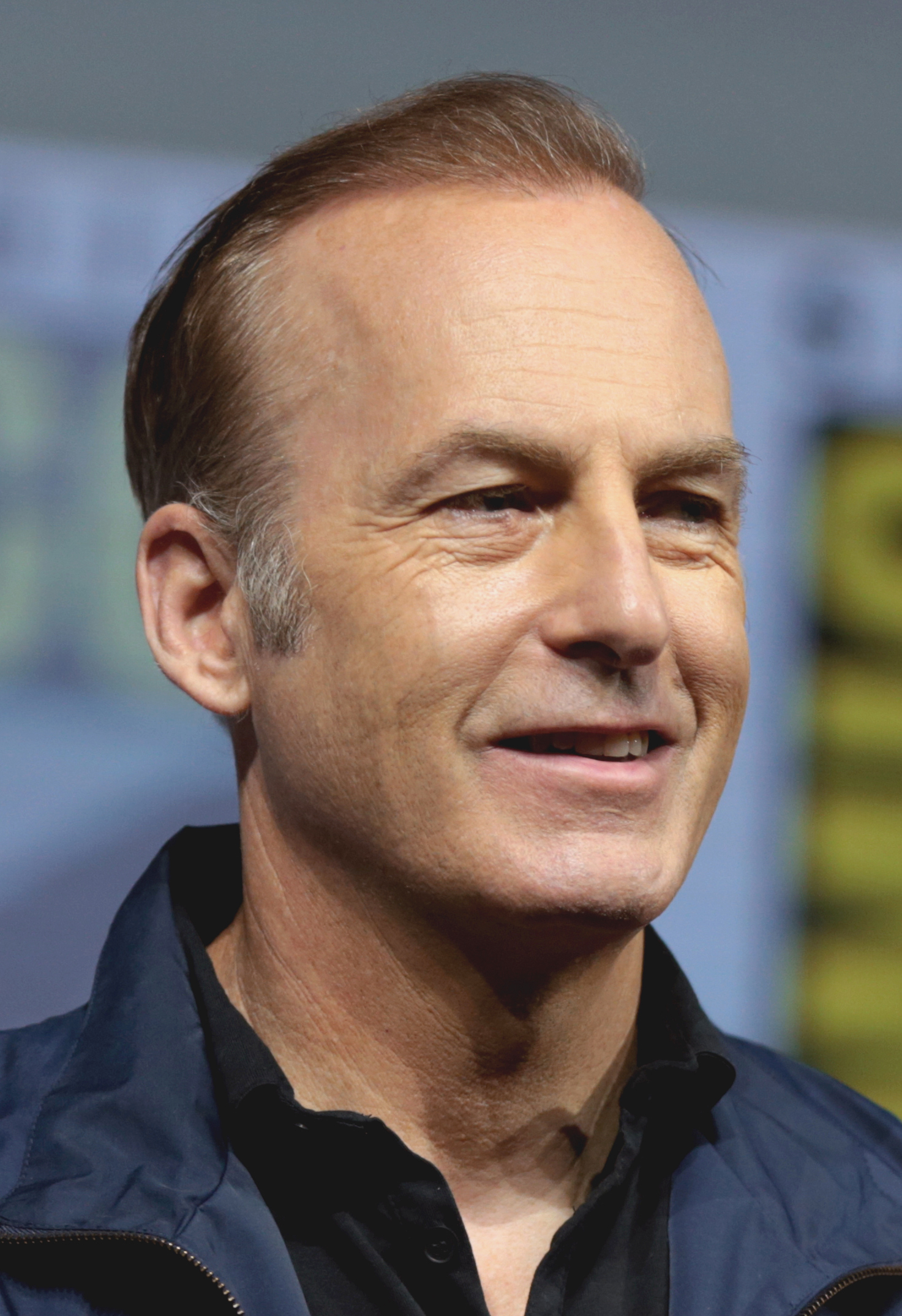
Jon Bernthal, Jamie Lee Curtis, and Bob Odenkirk (left to right) received Emmy nominations for their respective guest performances, with the first two winning.

"Fishes" introduces a number of new characters played by high-profile guest stars, including Jamie Lee Curtis, Gillian Jacobs, John Mulaney, Bob Odenkirk, and Sarah Paulson; only Odenkirk's casting was announced prior to the season's release. Jon Bernthal also reprises his role as Michael Berzatto from the first season.

=== Costume design ===
Costumer Courtney Wheeler chose several items in the episode to reflect where characters were at this time. Carmy's wearing of a European brand of jeans were intended to be indicative of the character's recent time overseas and "the gateway to liking denim." For the costuming of the character of Donna, Wheeler explained that Jessica Rodriguez, who does the aging and dying for the costume department, would "take [Donna's] stained shirt and pants and match the pasta sauce stains exactly on multiple sets so we could wash the dirty ones and keep filming." Mikey is depicted in a simple outfit of a shirt and jeans despite the event's formality. Per Wheeler, that is all he can manage at this point: "He's just waking up every morning and surviving, at that point...for where he is in his mental state and who he is, it felt like that was where he was at."

=== Hair styling ===
Ally Vickers, head of The Bear hair department, was inspired by Who's Afraid of Virginia Woolf? for the design of Donna Berzatto's hair, because she's meant to look "pristine on the outside, but she's in the depths of addiction and was coming undone." Curtis wore a wig for the shoot.

=== Set decoration ===
Set decorator Eric Frankel described the look for Donna's house as "Italian Christmas with an '80s twist." The set decoration spotlights the Berzatto family's Roman Catholicism as Donna has "decorated the house with nativity sets and has a crucifix hanging in the kitchen."

=== Filming ===
Unlike the rest of the series, which is shot digitally, this flashback episode was shot on 35mm film. The episode was filmed in a house in Evanston, Illinois. There were four days of filming scenes on the first floor of the house, prior to the longer dinner-table segment.

Star Jeremy Allen White recounted that production of the episode was relatively smooth, and praised the egoless, collaborative environment on set. Ebon Moss-Bachrach said that there was a lot of camaraderie among the guest stars on set, and later went on to praise Jamie Lee Curtis' acting ability and performance in the episode. Chris Witaske, who portrays Sugar's partner Pete, said that the preparation for the episode was more chaotic than the rest of the series, particularly due to the large amount of dual-dialogue in the script.

Witsake praised Bernthal's acting, saying his performance "was like watching a fucking master class in acting. The intensity and the full commitment that that dude brings was wild to watch." Similarly, in 2026, Mulaney said:

We were all at this table for two days filming that scene and it was so funny. Those actors are so good. They're so scary when they're acting. When I'm acting, I'm kind of just I'm saying the lines a little differently than I normally would. These people believe they're the character. These people are crazy. They really are in the scene. I remember...Sarah Paulson said something unscripted to Jamie Lee Curtis, and Jamie Lee Curtis lost it on Sarah Paulson, and just naturally I went 'Hey, hey, hey.' And she went, 'Don't you hey, hey, hey, me.' And I was like, 'Oh no, acting is so scary.'...It was like so funny and intense...I mean inappropriate loud crazy people are so funny.

Bernthal commented that the dark energy at the dinner table was real, in part due to "the power of an ensemble, like the power of theater, is you look around that table and everybody is just a thoroughbred. The tension is created in the room. Every time we went and did it, it was completely different—a new person sort of popped up and did this new bubble of intensity or dread. It was super fucking tense in there, because everybody came to play, and everybody really knows what they're doing." Storer revealed that Bernthal was originally given a rubber prop fork to throw at Odenkirk during the dinner argument scene, but that was then later substituted for a plastic fork so that Bernthal could better "whip it" for the camera. Mikey's table flip was not in the original script, but Bernthal asked Storer for permission to try a "go crazy" take, knowing that resetting Donna's elaborate table and the food platters would be a big demand on the production team.

Culinary producer Courtney Storer put together a "vision book" as she planned the menu for the episode, which brought to mind "Heartache, vibrance, colors...a lot of red...I'm a visual person, you know, when you think about a bleeding heart...heartache, loneliness, suffering, pain, all those things. And then holidays, Christmas, red!" Photos that inspired her included a 1960s-era Sophia Loren in full glam, presenting an eggplant dish, and "a heaping pot of meatballs in red sauce, a lot of splatter on the counter." Storer wanted a tablescape and menu that illustrated "this stark contrast of, like, presentable beauty, and then what's underneath it. And how could you show that in food? How is that possible when all the candles are lit and all the things seemingly feel and look beautiful? What's actually underneath all of that?"

Donna's "labor-intensive" meal plan involved branzino, lobsters, oysters Rockefeller, artichokes, meatballs, gravy, roasted peppers, potatoes, and bread. Courtney trained Curtis how to rip the heads off the lobsters, which were blanched in advance by Rob Levitt of Publican Quality Meats. Witaske quipped that the eighth-fish tuna casserole was his "mom's recipe."

B-camera operator Chris Dame filmed "9,000 inserts" of the set for the use of the editors. According to A-camera operator Gary Malouf, "...again, it's that trust of Storer saying, 'Dame, just shoot the hell out of this place. You got it.'...There's this beautiful montage at the beginning of that episode where you get to see what Chris was up to that whole time."

According to Frankel, Curtis "desperately" wanted to be her own stunt driver "but they wouldn't let her". The crash, filmed in two takes involved a wall on hinges, a prop lamp, and "three live Christmas trees all decorated the same [to destroy]."

=== Music ===
Producer and music supervisor Josh Senior told Billboard, "You'll find obscure tracks from Italian artists in the sixth episode." According to composer Jeffrey Qaiyum, they did some scoring for episode six but it was not used in the version that aired: "The Christmas songs in the background were the perfect bed. It's all about that dissonance. It was already there...Scoring wasn't needed. Anyone who's played in a band with a guitarist can tell you—bro, sometimes you gotta know when not to play."

== Reception ==
=== Critical reviews ===
GQ described "Fishes" as the standout episode of the second season, praising the ensemble cast. Brady Langmann of Esquire described the episode as "one of the year's best".

The Los Angeles Times praised the episode and Curtis' portrayal of Donna. Various critics called her performance Emmy-worthy.

Salon.com critic Melanie McFarland praised the episode's ability to deliver on plot and thematic issues while delivering the show's trademark intensity. Vulture called the episode "absolutely exhausting to watch" and said "[b]oth the writing and the execution of 'Fishes' speaks to how well The Bear is able to walk its dramatic tightrope, and come Emmy season 2024, you just know everyone involved in this episode is going to clean the hell up."

=== Accolades ===
Award	Category	Nominee(s)	Result	Ref.
ACE Eddie Awards	Best Edited Single-Camera Comedy Series	Joanna Naugle	Won	
Astra TV Awards	Best Directing in a Streaming Comedy Series	Christopher Storer	Won	
Astra TV Awards	Best Writing in a Streaming Comedy Series	Joanna Calo and Christopher Storer	Nominated	
Costume Designers Guild Awards	Excellence in Contemporary Television	Courtney Wheeler	Nominated	
Directors Guild of America Awards	Outstanding Directorial Achievement in Comedy Series	Christopher Storer	Won	
Golden Reel Awards	Outstanding Achievement in Music Editing – Broadcast Short Form	Jason Lingle and Jeff Lingle	Nominated	
Golden Reel Awards	Outstanding Achievement in Sound Editing – Broadcast Short Form	Steve "Major" Giammaria, Andrea Bella, Matt Snedecor, Evan Benjamin, John Werner, John Bowen, Annie Taylor, Leslie Bloome, and Shaun Brennan	Nominated	
Primetime Emmy Awards	Outstanding Directing for a Comedy Series	Christopher Storer	Won	
Primetime Emmy Awards	Outstanding Writing for a Comedy Series	Joanna Calo and Christopher Storer	Nominated	
Primetime Creative Arts Emmy Awards	Outstanding Contemporary Costumes	Courtney Wheeler, Lariana Santiago, and Steven "Rage" Rehage	Nominated	
Primetime Creative Arts Emmy Awards	Outstanding Contemporary Hairstyling	Ally Vickers, Angela Brasington, and Melanie Shaw	Nominated	
Primetime Creative Arts Emmy Awards	Outstanding Contemporary Makeup (Non-Prosthetic)	Ignacia Soto-Aguilar, Nicole Rogers, Justine Losoya, and Zsofia Otvos	Nominated	
Primetime Creative Arts Emmy Awards	Outstanding Guest Actor in a Comedy Series	Jon Bernthal	Won	
Primetime Creative Arts Emmy Awards	Outstanding Guest Actor in a Comedy Series	Bob Odenkirk	Nominated	
Primetime Creative Arts Emmy Awards	Outstanding Guest Actress in a Comedy Series	Jamie Lee Curtis	Won	
Primetime Creative Arts Emmy Awards	Outstanding Picture Editing for a Single-Camera Comedy Series	Joanna Naugle	Won	
Writers Guild of America Awards	Episodic Comedy	Joanna Calo and Christopher Storer	Nominated	
