= Gary (The Bear episode) =

- The Bear episode
- Directed by: Christopher Storer
- Written by: Ebon Moss-Bachrach & Jon Bernthal
- Cinematography by: Andrew Wehde
- Editing by: Joanna Naugle
- Production code: XCMV2026001
- Original air date: May 5, 2026
- Running time: 59 minutes

Guest appearances
- Jon Bernthal as Michael Berzatto; Marin Ireland as Sherri; Gillian Jacobs as Tiffany Jerimovich

Episode chronology
← Previous "Goodbye"	Next → "Soda"

"Gary" is a special episode of the American comedy-drama series The Bear, written by and starring cast members Ebon Moss-Bachrach and Jon Bernthal and directed by series creator Christopher Storer. The episode is a flashback to early 2019, when Richie's pregnant wife Tiff (Gillian Jacobs) is close to her due date. Richie (Moss-Bachrach) and Mikey (Bernthal) get a job from Jimmy and take an emotionally charged road trip from Chicago to Gary, Indiana.

The 39th episode of the series, "Gary" was released as a surprise drop on May 5, 2026, on Hulu and FX, streaming separately from the rest of the show's catalogue, and was made available the following day on FXNOW and FX On Demand. The episode received largely positive reviews from critics, who praised its tone, direction, and naturalism, while other reviewers found the episode meandering and self-indulgent. Bernthal and Moss-Bachrach's performances received acclaim.

== Plot ==
Uncle Jimmy has asked Mikey and Richie to deliver a box, contents unknown, to someone in Gary, Indiana, a drive that is only 35 minutes away. Due to superstition, Tiff demands that Richie return by 5:15 p.m. as she believes that that is when she will give birth.

Richie and Mikey joke and banter with playful insults while they listen to the former's Tunes 4 Gary mixtape CD of travel songs. When they arrive, the recipient is not ready and they decide to spend the next couple of hours having fun. They stop by a hot dog restaurant and chat with the owner, play basketball with the locals, and come up with names for Tiff's baby, settling on Eva after a woman Mikey met. At one point Mikey says he got "a cue," gets out of the truck, walks halfway down the block and then comes back, all while Richie is on the phone with Tiff, who is reporting symptoms suggesting she may be in labor or pre-labor.

Richie insists on going into a bar after believing it is "a sign", but Mikey refuses. He is ultimately coaxed into entering by a woman named Sherri. Richie regales the group with numerous stories and has fun with bar games, while Mikey makes a connection with Sherri by playing true or false. Mikey eventually opens up about how his mental health has been affected by his mother, Donna, and relates how she would go from meticulously planning his days to then snapping at him one day for asking what her plans were.

Realizing that it is nearly time, and wanting to get back to Tiff as soon as possible, Richie discovers that Mikey's phone is dead, and urges Mikey that they need to go. Before doing so, Mikey gives a speech to the bar goers about Richie being a father and congratulating him, but it quickly becomes insulting with Mikey insisting that Richie is a coward and will abandon his daughter. Richie slaps Mikey as they quietly leave to go deliver the box, revealed to contain plastic pump impellers.

As the two leave Gary, Mikey attempts to make it up to Richie by playing his CD, but Richie throws it out the window. According to the display in Mikey's truck, it is 5:15 p.m. on January 11, 2019. They cannot cross the tracks and drive home until the regularly scheduled freight train passes by. In the present, Richie reflects on the trip in his car, but while crossing the intersection is T-boned by another vehicle.

== Production ==
=== Writing ===
"Gary" was co-written by Ebon Moss-Bachrach & Jon Bernthal. The script was originally filed with the Writers Guild of America under the temporary title "TBD 421 aka 411." The pair had long talked about creating a flashback scene of Richie and Mikey to expand on what had been depicted in "Fishes," and they had shared a couple of those ideas with executive producer Christopher Storer. They ended up on a conference call about it, Moss-Bachrach told TheWrap, and "Before we could say anything, Chris immediately said, 'Listen, would you guys be open to writing a standalone episode for the show about this day, about a trip?' And it's sort of based on a, in a very loose way, a Western. Where two guys go to a town and drop something off, and time kind of melts away, there's a gal at the bar. You know, that, in a very sort of archetypal kind of way." Bernthal added, "We had this idea of a bar sort of appearing out of nowhere, and there was this sort of fantastical element." Moss-Bachrach mentioned "oasis," Brigadoon, and a "slightly poetic, impressionistic feel" when describing the inspiration for the barroom interlude. Another inspiration was the 1970 John Cassavetes movie Husbands.

They included Mikey suggesting the name Eva for Richie's daughter as a way of "having a continuum, and a lineage" in the family. Moss-Bachrach pointed out to TV Insider that, even though the lifelong friends have nothing but time to talk over the course of that day, "when Michael starts to really reveal and peel back what's going on inside his head, what's going on inside his heart, it's not to Richie," but to a woman he just met, Sherri (Marin Ireland). Moss-Bachrach told USA Today that Mikey's state of mind at the time of "Gary" is that "He doesn't want to revisit the day-to-day. He doesn't want to return to his house full of demons and ghosts," and Richie reminds him of "everything that he's trying to avoid."

Any apparent similarities between Mikey and Richie's fight at the bar, and Carmy and Richie's fight from opposite sides of a locked fridge door in "The Bear" episode, were "not an accident." Moss-Bachrach told Entertainment Weekly, "I think for Mike...that eruption and that attack on Richie happens because he knows Richie's gonna be starting a family, and he's gonna be losing his friend a little bit...like, 'You can't fire me, I quit'...Like, 'Let me burn it down before I can get hurt by the thing'." Bernthal told an interviewer that the story loads in, for Richie, "the regret, and the remorse, wishing maybe things had gone a little bit different." A writer for TV Guide argued, "It seems likely that they never reconciled fully after [Gary]. Richie's guilt that he didn't do more to help Mikey is specifically rooted in this trip, when these two best friends had 35 minutes, at least, in a car together, while traveling from Gary back to Chicago, to talk about what's really troubling both of them. They don't. They suppress instead of letting it rip."

There are shots of a smouldering, smoking field at several points in the episode, but the meaning of the image is unknown and disputed. Did the "wired and worried travelers" bring their "scorched earth" style of conflict on the road with them? Moss-Bachrach told Decider, "I always love the scenes that are like not the capital 'D' drama scenes. I love people just behaving and being together. I love the scene in the Koney King. I love when they're getting the 40s. I love outside, like the kick demonstration. I really love that. I love just watching two people, like, stare at a weird, controlled fire on the side of the road."

=== Casting ===
Moss-Bachrach is the only main cast member from the show's opening credits to appear in the episode. Bernthal and Gillian Jacobs reprise their guest star roles for "Gary".

Bernthal told Gold Derby about the casting of Marin Ireland as Sherri that, "Marin's somebody that we've known for a long time. I'm completely obsessed with her. We worked together on a series last year [His & Hers], and I came up in New York watching her on stage, and I'm just kind of blown away by her. She and I did a play together in Ojai when we asked her to do this. I think she's singular."

=== Filming ===
The episode was shot on location over about seven days using "3perf" 35 mm movie film with Panavision lenses. Cinematographer Andrew Wehde wrote on Instagram, "My goal was to process the film in a way that felt like a memory, that stood on its own from the look and tone of The Bear." "Fishes" was also shot on film. Bernthal told On the Red Carpet, "Mikey is always through the lens of memory...good or bad...this is a private experience. The only one who actually knows...what happened this day is Richie...he saw an image of this person that was so dear to him, before he lost him, that was so ugly."

The show is primarily shot using digital Alexa Mini LF cameras. The show did an intra-episode aspect ratio shift once before, in "Braciole," to establish the contrast between Carmy's cooking-show nightmare and the ongoing action.

The episode was filmed "right after season 4." The Gary vibe is established with footage of downtown and "drive-by shots along Broadway." The meal at Koney King was "unscripted and done in one take, showing a real-life conversation unfold among Moss-Bachrach, Bernthal, and [Elisha] Evans over a chili cheese dog, a pizza puff, and a lemonade." Interior bar scenes in Gary were filmed at Southsides in Alsip, Illinois.

=== Music ===
About the music for "Gary," Moss-Bachrach said, "There's a lot of soul music and R&B," which distinguishes it from the "more contemporary" music of the main series, "but there's an ebullience and a buoyancy to most of the songs."

Songs used include "Heart of the Sunrise" by Yes, the Jamaican reggae classics "Draw Your Brakes" by Scotty and "Johnny Too Bad" by the Slickers, "When Somebody Loves You Back" by Teddy Pendergrass, and "Paid in Full" by Eric B. & Rakim. The Teddy Pendergrass song, "When Somebody Loves You Back," was playing at Koney King by happenstance. Moss-Bachrach recognized the song, and commented, "Romantic hot-dog place you've got here." Elisha Evans, who has worked at Koney King for seven years in real life and served Mikey and Richie as Alicia in that scene, told the Chicago Tribune, "As long as I'm here, I'm gonna be listening to some R&B."

== Release ==
The episode was not promoted in advance, except for a teaser posted on Instagram on April 30 by Bernthal, depicting himself and Moss-Bachrach in front of a burning field, with the caption "Richie. And. Mikey." The episode drop was announced on Moss-Bachrach's Instagram, with the caption "COUSINS! PRIMOS!! CUGINI!!! Get ready for GARY!!!! We are so excited to finally share this little adventure with Richie and Mikey. Written by me and @jonnybernthal. Directed by the one Christopher Storer. Making this was a dream come true." It was released on Hulu and aired on the FX pay television channel.

== Reception ==
=== Critical reviews ===
"Gary" received largely positive reviews, with Bernthal and Moss-Bachrach's performances receiving widespread acclaim. Los Angeles Times TV critic Robert Lloyd described the episode as riveting and a "kind of shaggy dog story, through lighter and darker territory on its way to a droll punchline involving the contents of the box, before it jumps forward into its brief present-day coda." Regarding Moss-Bachrach and Bernthal, he wrote, "one senses that as writers, they've built themselves a playground to act in; both are phenomenal. The Bear always calls upon its cast to stretch, much as their self-improving characters are. Phoning it in is never an option." Judy Berman of Time deemed it "one of the increasingly uneven hit's best episodes in ages, a standalone that fleshes out a crucial relationship and suggests how much better the show could be with Carmy on the sidelines."

Roxana Hadadi of Vulture described "Gary" as "like nearly every flashback that has featured Mikey since season one practically sanctified the man...another challenging, sometimes-sluggish episode about Mikey's deteriorating mental health and his attacks on the people he loved." But in the course of things the viewer gleans the truth out of the constant lying: "This isn't gangster shit, this isn't a 'mission,' this isn't a meeting with 'clients', as Richie boasted to Tiffany. This is Mikey and Richie being warm bodies for Jimmy, and this is another instance of their friendship shattering," and perhaps the producers are insistently "chastising us for thinking [Mikey's] first 'Let it rip' was a beautiful moment of one brother passing the torch to another." Stuart Heritage of The Guardian wrote, "The Bear still isn't a comedy by any stretch, but the meal made out of a trip of such scant distance is one of the funniest things it has done in years...It bodes well for season five that 'Gary' was released as a standalone episode. When The Bear is at its worst, it loses interest in the restaurant and prefers to meander through endless flashbacks and bottle episodes. Gary may be a sign that The Bear wants to clear the decks and regain its focus."

Saloni Gajjar of The A.V. Club was more mixed, feeling the episode was "purpose-built" to disappoint viewers invested in the original premise of the show. She wrote, "as affecting as Bernthal and Moss-Bachrach's performances are, 'Gary' doubles down on some of The Bear's self-indulgent storytelling impulses: characters yelling at or over each other constantly, lazily written interactions (why in the world is Ireland's Sherri waxing poetic about trees to Mikey?), and a visual aesthetic that has gone from gritty to gimmicky with its close-up shots." Belen Edwards of Mashable also criticized the Sherri character as the latest example of The Bear's superficial female love interests.

Kevin Fallon of The Daily Beast called the episode "so freaking bad", writing, "sure, it's remarkable how good Moss-Bachrach and Bernthal are at portraying working-class people joshing each other, bickering, and just getting through the day's most mundane tasks, like driving from one city to another, or drinking at a bar. But the reason we don't often see those things in TV shows is because of how epically boring it is. (...) The Bear, for all of its acclaim and all of the discourse it inspired, may be the most precarious show on TV. Its first season was such a powder keg of intensity and stress that it makes sense it exploded the way it did. But maintaining that has, for the show, been a constant balancing act. How much of the screaming anxiety is compelling versus headache-inducing and annoying?" Conversely, Giovanni Lago of Next Best Picture asserted that "Gary" was an exercise in "effortless naturalism. Nearly every line sounds as though the actors are riffing in real time. If the sequence of Mikey and Richie drunkenly playing basketball with local teenagers were revealed to have been largely improvised, it would not be remotely surprising. (...) In the span of a single hour, the episode deepens not only the baggage embedded in Mikey and Richie's shared history but also Richie's present-day struggles with grief and fatherhood." Splice Today analogized it to a record's B-side, and wrote that "Gary" was a "corrective to the issues of its late seasons" that "doesn't luxuriate in misery because it captures a moment between these two men that's honest, if not completely happy. The characters on The Bear have multitudes, and it's possible for a moment right before disaster to be joyful and unnerving...'Gary' may end up being a masterclass in strategy on Storer's part, but for now, it's a welcome detour." Esquire named it one of the best TV episodes of 2026.
