= Christopher Storer =

American screenwriter, director, and producer

- Born: 1980 or 1981 (age 44–45)
- Occupations: Screenwriter; director; producer

Christopher Storer (born 1980 or 1981) is an American screenwriter, director, and producer. Having initially risen to prominence for his collaborations with comedian Bo Burnham, such as co-directing Burnham's comedy specials what. (2013) and Make Happy (2016) and producing Burnham's debut film Eighth Grade (2018). He became more widely known as the creator, co-showrunner, writer, and director of the comedy-drama series The Bear (2022–2026), for which he has won four Primetime Emmy Awards.

== Early life and education ==
Christopher Storer was born in 1980 or 1981 and grew up in Park Ridge, Illinois. It was here that he met Chris Zucchero, the owner of Mr. Beef, the sandwich shop which became the basis for The Bear. Storer's sister Courtney Storer is a professional chef who serves as a culinary supervisor on the series.

== Career ==
Storer rose to prominence with his collaborations with Bo Burnham—co-directing the comedy specials what. (2013) and Make Happy (2016), as well as serving as a producer on Burnham's debut feature film Eighth Grade (2018)—and Hasan Minhaj on his comedy special Homecoming King (2017), which received a Peabody Award. His directing work on the Burnham, Minhaj, and Ramy Youssef (Feelings) specials contributed substantially to establishing the contemporary stand-up special as a distinct cinematic genre and creative art form.

From 2019 he served as a director and an executive producer on Ramy Youssef's comedy-drama series Ramy.

He became widely known as the creator, co-showrunner, writer, and director of the comedy-drama series The Bear (2022–2026), for which he has won four Emmy Awards.

== Personal life ==
Storer lives in Los Angeles. He is the partner of Gillian Jacobs.

== Filmography ==
=== Film ===
Producer

Year	Title	Notes
2012	Adventures in the Sin Bin	
2018	Eighth Grade	
2020	The Rental	
2021	On the Count of Three	Executive producer
2024	Y2K	

Writer

Year	Title	Notes
2012	Adventures in the Sin Bin	
2025	F1	"Additional Literary Material"

=== Television ===
Director/writer/producer

Year	Title	Director	Writer	Producer	Notes
2013	Bo Burnham: what.	Yes	No	No	Comedy special Co-director
2016	Bo Burnham: Make Happy	Yes	No	No	Comedy special Co-director
2017	Hasan Minhaj: Homecoming King	Yes	No	No	Comedy special
2018	The Comedy Lineup	Yes	No	No	16 episodes
2019–2022	Ramy	Yes	No	Yes	Executive producer (20 episodes); Co-executive producer (4 episodes); Director (6 episodes)
2019	Ramy Youssef: Feelings	Yes	No	Yes	Comedy special
2019	Jeff Garlin: Our Man in Chicago	Yes	No	No	Comedy special
2019	Dan Soder: Son of a Gary	Yes	No	Yes	Comedy special
2020	Little Voice	Yes	No	No	1 episode
2021	Dickinson	Yes	No	No	2 episodes
2022–2026	The Bear	Yes	Yes	Yes	Creator, co-showrunner

Executive producer

Year	Title	Notes
2017	Jerrod Carmichael: 8	Comedy special
2018	Chris Rock: Tamborine	Comedy special
2018	Drew Michael: Drew Michael	Comedy special
2019	Home Videos	
2019	Sermon on The Mount	Documentary
2019	Lil Rel: Live in Crenshaw	Comedy special
2020	Whitmer Thomas: The Golden One	Comedy special
2020	Drew Michael: Red Blue Green	Comedy special

== Awards and nominations ==
Year	Award	Category	Nominated work	Result
2024	Astra TV Awards	Best Directing in a Streaming Series, Comedy	The Bear (for "Review")	Nominated
2024	Astra TV Awards	Best Writing in a Streaming Series, Comedy	The Bear (for "System")	Won
2023	Directors Guild of America Awards	Outstanding Directorial Achievement in Comedy Series	The Bear (for "Review")	Nominated
2024	Directors Guild of America Awards	Outstanding Directorial Achievement in Comedy Series	The Bear (for "Fishes")	Won
2019	Independent Spirit Awards	Best Film	Eighth Grade	Nominated
2017	Peabody Awards	Art & Industry	Hasan Minaj: Homecoming King	Won
2023	Primetime Emmy Awards	Outstanding Comedy Series	The Bear	Won
2023	Primetime Emmy Awards	Outstanding Directing for a Comedy Series	The Bear (for "Review")	Won
2023	Primetime Emmy Awards	Outstanding Writing for a Comedy Series	The Bear (for "System")	Won
2024	Primetime Emmy Awards	Outstanding Comedy Series	The Bear	Nominated
2024	Primetime Emmy Awards	Outstanding Directing for a Comedy Series	The Bear (for "Fishes")	Won
2024	Primetime Emmy Awards	Outstanding Writing for a Comedy Series	The Bear (for "Fishes")	Nominated
2025	Primetime Emmy Awards	Outstanding Comedy Series	The Bear	Nominated
2026	Primetime Emmy Awards	Outstanding Comedy Series	The Bear	Nominated
2026	Primetime Emmy Awards	Outstanding Directing for a Comedy Series	The Bear (for "Bears")	Nominated
2023	Writers Guild of America Awards	Comedy Series	The Bear	Won
2023	Writers Guild of America Awards	New Series	The Bear	Nominated
2023	Writers Guild of America Awards	Episodic Comedy	The Bear (for "Braciole")	Nominated
2024	Writers Guild of America Awards	Comedy Series	The Bear	Won
2024	Writers Guild of America Awards	Episodic Comedy	The Bear (for "Fishes")	Nominated
