= Hawthorn Motor Garage =

Heritage-listed former garage in Melbourne, Victoria, Australia

Hawthorn Motor Garage (former)
- The former garage in 2022

- Location of the former garage in Greater Metropolitan Melbourne

General information
- Status: Completed
- Type: Garage (former)
- Architectural style: Edwardian; Federation Free Classical
- Location: 735 Glenferrie Road, Hawthorn, City of Boroondara, Melbourne, Victoria, Australia
- Coordinates: 37°49′06″S 145°02′09″E
- Current tenants: Motor: wine bar and bistro
- Completed: 1912; 114 years ago
- Client: Ernest Hill

Technical details
- Material: Red bricks; timber; render; galvanised iron
- Size: 27 by 11 m (89 by 36 ft)

Design and construction
- Architect: Christopher Cowper

Victorian Heritage Register
- Official name: Former Hawthorn Motor Garage
- Type: Registered place
- Designated: 10 May 2012
- Reference no.: VHR H2296
- Heritage overlay no.: HO570
- Category: Transport - Road

The Hawthorn Motor Garage is a former garage, now wine bar and bistro, located at 735 Glenferrie Road in Hawthorn, in the City of Boroondara, in the inner eastern suburbs of Melbourne, in Victoria, Australia. The single-storey brick building is the oldest known purpose-built motor garage in Victoria.

Built in 1912 on the traditional lands of the Wurundjeri people, the house was added to the Victorian Heritage Register on 10 May 2012 in recognition of its historical and architectural significance; and was also added to a non-statutory list by the Victorian branch of the National Trust on 7 February 2000.

== History ==
Ernest Hill, a local auctioneer, commissioned Christopher Alfred Cowper (1868–1954) to design the Hawthorn Motor Garage in 1912. Cowper was a prominent Melbourne architect who lived in Hawthorn and is best known for the many red-brick Federation style houses he designed in the nearby Grace Park Estate. He also designed flats, including Summerland Mansions in St Kilda; theatres, including the Sun Theatre at Yarraville in the Streamline Moderne style; and other commercial buildings. The garage was praised for its modern design.

Its main business then was the storing, washing, repairing, hiring, and selling of motor vehicles. Selling petrol was a sideline and was sold from cans stored inside the garage. Petrol bowsers were introduced to Victoria in 1914, and were installed on the kerbs outside garages from about 1920. The Kane family, who ran the Hawthorn Motor Garage for more than twenty years from the 1920s, installed the first electric petrol pump in Hawthorn during that time. The building was used for car-related businesses until the early twenty-first century.

Repurposed for retail and hospitality, the premises has been used as the location for Motor, a wine bar and bistro since 2022.

== Description ==
The building is essentially a long narrow brick shed, about 11 metres (36 ft) wide and about 27 metres (89 ft) long. Facing Glenferrie Road is a decorative face brick and render facade, with a wide central brick-arched entrance flanked by large windows. The bays are divided by brick pilasters topped with cement balls and connected by brick arches, and there is a rendered arched parapet. The roof is of corrugated galvanised iron, though the original timber trusses have been replaced by steel. Internally no original features remain.

== See also ==
- Architecture of Melbourne
- List of places on the Victorian Heritage Register in the City of Boroondara
