= Enoteca Sociale =

Italian restaurant in Toronto, Ontario, Canada

- Interactive map of Enoteca Sociale

Restaurant information
- Established: May 1, 2010
- Owners: Rocco Agostino; Daniel Clark; Max Rimaldi
- Head chef: Rocco Agostino
- Chef: Kyle Rindinella
- Food type: Italian
- Rating: Bib Gourmand (Michelin Guide)
- Location: 1288 Dundas Street West, Toronto, Ontario, Canada
- Coordinates: 43.6496°N 79.4257°W
- Website: sociale.ca

Enoteca Sociale is an Italian restaurant located in the Little Portugal neighbourhood of Toronto's west end.

== History ==
The restaurant opened in the summer of 2010, founded by Max Rimaldi, Daniel Clark, and chef Rocco Agostino, who also co-own the Toronto-based pizza chain Pizzeria Libretto. It specifically focuses on cuisine from Italy's Rome area, with the owners emulating the vibe of a neighbourhood trattoria in the city.

While Agostino serves as the restaurant's executive chef, several chefs de cuisine have held the position over the years, including Grant van Gameren, who later opened Michelin-recognized Toronto restaurants Bar Raval and Quetzal. As of 2024, Kyle Rindella is the restaurant's chef de cuisine.

The business is known for promoting a positive work-life balance for its employees, including offering staff a four day work week without any reduction in pay. It provides an a la carte menu in its main dining room, which includes a large marble counter with bar seating for solo diners. There is also a four seat chef's counter, where a tasting menu is offered and provides diners a direct view into the kitchen.

== Recognition ==
The business was named a Bib Gourmand restaurant by the Michelin Guide at Toronto's 2022 Michelin Guide ceremony, and has retained this recognition each year following. A Bib Gourmand recognition is awarded to restaurants who offer "exceptionally good food at moderate prices." Michelin highlighted the restaurant's pastas as the "heart of the menu", including the signature cacio e pepe and bucatini all’Amatriciana.

Toronto Life magazine called the restaurant "unlike any other Italian spot in the city", praising its simple, ambitious and affordable dishes.

== See also ==
- List of Michelin Bib Gourmand restaurants in Canada
