= Wynona (restaurant) =

Italian restaurant in Toronto, Ontario, Canada

- Interactive map of Wynona

Restaurant information
- Established: June 5, 2018
- Owner: Jeffrey Bovis
- Head chef: Jeba Sritharan
- Food type: Italian
- Rating: Bib Gourmand (Michelin Guide, 2022-2024)
- Location: 819 Gerrard Street East, Toronto, Ontario, Canada
- Coordinates: 43.6671°N 79.3446°W
- Website: wynonatoronto.com

Wynona is an Italian restaurant and wine bar located in the Riverdale neighbourhood of Toronto's east end.

== History ==
At its opening in 2018, the restaurant's kitchen was led by chef-operator Jeffrey Bovis.

As of 2024 Jeba Sritharan has taken the lead chef role and manages day-to-day kitchen operations.

== Concept ==
The establishment features an open kitchen and a made-from-scratch menu that changes weekly to reflect seasonal and local ingredients. In addition to its dining offerings, the restaurant operates as a wine bar and neighborhood bistro, specializing in natural and unfiltered wines.

The restaurant's name, Wynona, was chosen for its aesthetic appeal, described as being "pretty, feminine, and looks good written down."

== Recognition ==
The business was named a Bib Gourmand restaurant by the Michelin Guide at Toronto's 2022 Michelin Guide ceremony, and retained it in 2023 and 2024 before losing the designation and being removed from the Guide in 2025. A Bib Gourmand recognition is awarded to restaurants who offer "exceptionally good food at moderate prices." In its guide, Michelin specifically highlighted the restaurant's lumache pasta served with sausage crumble, sugar snap peas and cheese.

The restaurant was ranked as one of Toronto's best new restaurants in the 2019 edition of the list from Toronto Life magazine.

== See also ==
- List of Michelin Bib Gourmand restaurants in Canada
