= La Bartola =

Former Mexican restaurant in Toronto, Ontario, Canada

- Interactive map of La Bartola

Restaurant information
- Established: June 27, 2020
- Closed: March 15, 2025
- Owner: Ivan Castro
- Head chef: Ivan Castro
- Food type: Mexican; Vegan
- Rating: Bib Gourmand (Michelin Guide)
- Location: 588 College Street, Toronto, Ontario, Canada
- Coordinates: 43.6554°N 79.4135°W
- Website: www.labartola.ca

La Bartola was a Mexican restaurant which operated in Toronto, Ontario. It served a fully vegan and plant-based menu.

== History ==
The restaurant was owned and operated by Ivan Castro, who also served as the head chef. The restaurant opened in summer 2020, in the midst of the peak of restrictions during the COVID-19 pandemic. As a result of these restrictions, the restaurant started primarily as a takeout operation, with limited seating on an outside patio.

Prior to opening a brick-and-mortar location, Castro first started the business as a taqueria pop-up which served food at festivals in the Toronto-area. He also worked as a private chef and hosted supper clubs at his home. Castro wanted to serve a menu at his restaurant inspired by his upbringing in Mexico City.

Castro announced he would close the restaurant on March 15, 2025, citing the physical and mental toll that owning and operating a restaurant took on his wellbeing.

== Concept ==
The restaurant was fully vegan and served plant-based cuisine, with the goal of serving Mexican cooking based on the ingredients the indigenous Aztecs and Mayans would have used prior to the introduction of beef or dairy. In lieu of meat in its tacos, La Bartola served fillings such as braised hibiscus flowers, smoked banana blossoms, and jackfruit.

It offered an a la carte menu, but also had an option for a tasting menu for guests.

== Recognition ==
The restaurant was awarded a Bib Gourmand designation by the Michelin Guide at Toronto's 2022 Michelin Guide ceremony, and retained this recognition in 2023 and 2024. A Bib Gourmand is awarded to restaurants who offer "exceptionally good food at moderate prices." Michelin praised the business's vegan offerings, highlighting the black sesame tostadas, sikil pak, and braised hibiscus tacos.

== See also ==
- List of Michelin Bib Gourmand restaurants in Canada
