= Alma (Toronto restaurant) =

Asian Fusion restaurant in Toronto, Ontario, Canada

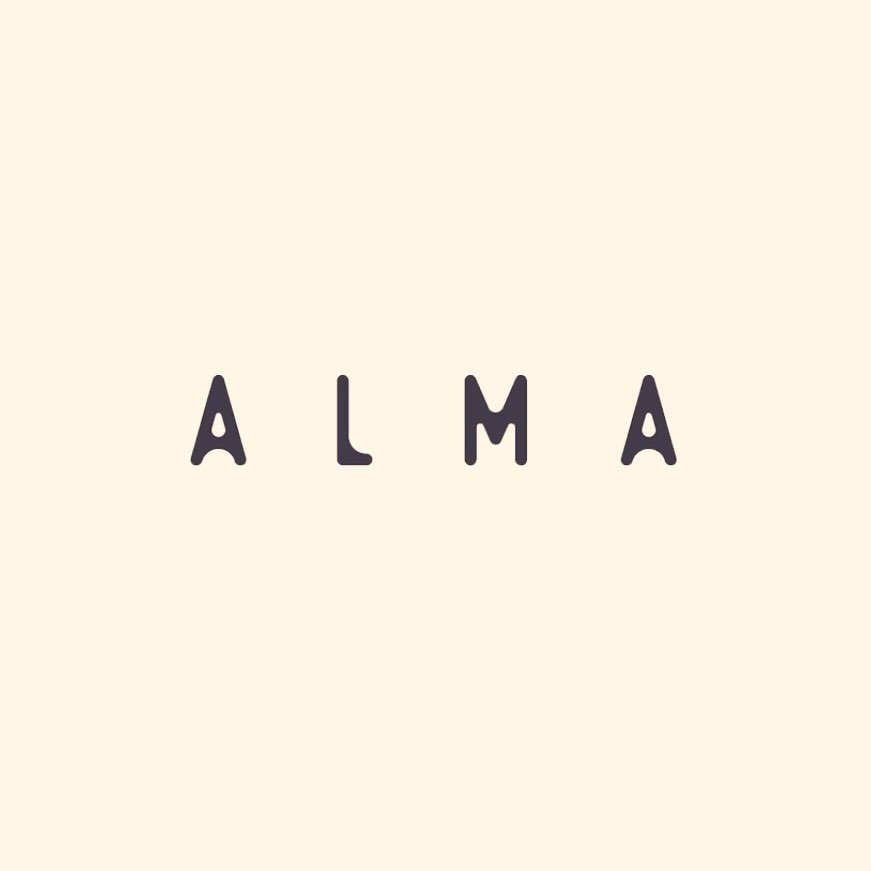
- Interactive map of Alma

Restaurant information
- Established: July 1, 2018
- Owners: Anna Chen; William Dunn
- Head chef: Anna Chen
- Food type: Asian Fusion; Chinese
- Rating: Bib Gourmand (Michelin Guide)
- Location: 1194 Bloor Street West, Toronto, Ontario, Canada
- Coordinates: 43°39′34″N 79°26′17″W
- Seating capacity: 34
- Website: www.almatoronto.com

Alma is an Asian fusion restaurant in the Bloordale Village neighbourhood in Toronto, Ontario, Canada.

== History ==
The restaurant was opened in July 2018 by Anna Chen, who also serves as the head chef, and her husband William Dunn. Chen, originally from Calcutta, India, is of Hakka Chinese heritage. She had previous experience working at restaurants in Toronto and London.

At its opening, the restaurant focused on fusion cuisine, taking influence from French, Italian, and Hakka Chinese cooking styles. Chen cited wanting the restaurant to serve "simple and approachable, yet meticulously constructed, food". During the COVID-19 pandemic, Chen shifted the restaurant’s culinary focus towards modern Chinese cuisine, including incorporating elements more deeply rooted in her Hakka Chinese heritage.

Parmesan tapioca fritters are considered the restaurant's signature dish. Everything served at the restaurant is made from scratch, including its miso and soy sauce.

The business’s name, Alma, is derived from the same Latin word, meaning “kind" or "nourishing.”

== Recognition ==
The business was named a Bib Gourmand restaurant by the Michelin Guide at Toronto's 2022 Michelin Guide ceremony, and has retained this recognition each year following. A Bib Gourmand recognition is awarded to restaurants who offer "exceptionally good food at moderate prices." Michelin specifically mentioned the restaurant's pan-fried radish cakes, scallion bread with stracciatella cheese, and noodles with pork wontons as dish highlights.

CBC Toronto food writer Suresh Doss praised Chen for offering a distinctive perspective within Toronto’s culinary landscape. He also highlighted the restaurant’s scallion pancakes, noting the dish's successful combination of cheese and bread.

=== Canada's 100 Best Restaurants Ranking ===
Alma
Year	Rank	Change
2022	94	new
2023	91	▲3
2024	▼ No Rank	
2025	75	▲ re-entry
2026	▼ No Rank	

== See also ==
- List of Michelin Bib Gourmand restaurants in Canada
