= Casavant (restaurant) =

French bistro in Montreal, Canada

- Interactive map of Casavant

Restaurant information
- Established: 2023
- Owners: Matisse Deslauriers; Geoffroy Gravel; Amélie Demchuk
- Head chef: Charles-Tristan Prévost
- Food type: French
- Rating: Bib Gourmand (Michelin Guide)
- Location: 350 rue de Castelnau Est, Montreal, Quebec, Canada
- Coordinates: 45.5385°N 73.6175°W
- Seating capacity: 24
- Website: www.casavantmontreal.com

Casavant is a French bistro in the Villeray–Saint-Michel–Parc-Extension borough of Montreal, Canada.

== History ==
The restaurant was opened in fall 2023 by Matisse Deslauriers and Geoffroy Gravel, and is named after Deslauriers grandmother. Alongside the two, a number of individuals hold shares in the restaurant, with many working at Montreal wine bar Vinvinvin. Charles-Tristan Prévost serves as the head chef of the restaurant.

Located near the Jean Talon Market, much of the restaurant's ingredients are sourced from there, and are influenced by the seasonal harvests. It is open seven days a week and serves food each day until midnight.

== Recognition ==
In 2025, the business received a 'Bib Gourmand' designation in Quebec's inaugural Michelin Guide. Per the guide, a Bib Gourmand recognition is awarded to restaurants who offer "exceptionally good food at moderate prices." Michelin praised the restaurant's cuisine as "generous, meticulously prepared and indulgent".

US-based food publication Eater lists Casavant among its "38 Best Restaurants in Montreal," highlighting the beef tartare with smoked mackerel and the sausage on mash as standout dishes, alongside the restaurant's wine list.

=== Canada's 100 Best Restaurants Ranking ===
Casavant has appeared on Canada's 100 Best Restaurants each year since its opening in 2023, presently ranking at #100.

Casavant
Year	Rank	Change
2024	87	new
2025	31	▲56
2026	100	▼69

== See also ==
- List of Michelin Bib Gourmand Restaurants in Canada
