= Buvette Scott =

Wine bar in Quebec City, Canada

- Interactive map of Buvette Scott

Restaurant information
- Established: 2014
- Owners: Pier-Luc Germain; Jean-Philippe Lessard; Dave St-Yves
- Head chef: Jean-Philippe Lessard
- Food type: Quebecois
- Rating: Bib Gourmand (Michelin Guide)
- Location: 821 rue Scott, Quebec City, Quebec, Canada
- Coordinates: 46.8092°N 71.2212°W
- Seating capacity: 25
- Website: www.buvettescott.com

Buvette Scott is a restaurant and wine bar in the La Cité borough of Quebec City, Canada.

== History ==
The business was started in 2014 by three friends, Pier-Luc Germain, Jean-Philippe Lessard, and Dave St-Yves. Lessard also serves as the restaurant's head chef. St-Yves, who previously had a decade working for Quebec crown corporation and alcohol distributor Société des alcools du Québec, manages the restaurant's wine list.

== Recognition ==
In 2025, the business received a 'Bib Gourmand' designation in Quebec's inaugural Michelin Guide. Per the guide, a Bib Gourmand recognition is awarded to restaurants who offer "exceptionally good food at moderate prices." Michelin highlighted the selection of wines offered by the restaurant, as well as its "inventive cuisine" that changes daily.

Montreal Gazette restaurant critic Lesley Chesterman gave Buvette Scott 2 1/2 out of 4 stars in her August 2017 review, praising the blackboard menu of dishes made solely of local ingredients, singling out the duck hearts as a favourite dish. While Buvette Scott is considered a wine bar, Chesterman also highlighted the "ever-changing" beer list, comprising many obscure beers that may not be commonly found elsewhere.

In 2024, online restaurant review portal Yelp named Buvette Scott #2 in its list of Top 100 places to eat in Canada. The list was derived from user data and submissions from the community in its review forums.

US-based food publication Eater listed Buvette Scott among its "28 Best Restaurants in Quebec City," stating it is "Simple and affordable" while using local and seasonal ingredients in its often changing dishes.

Montreal based culinary magazine Tastet highlighted the restaurant's "inventive menu that is constantly renewed", and a place that one would be "eager to go back" to.

== See also ==
- List of Michelin Bib Gourmand Restaurants in Canada
