= Hemant Bhagwani =

Indo-Canadian chef

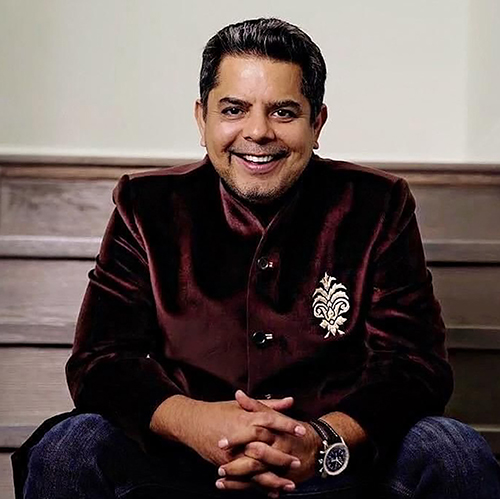
Hemant Bhagwani

Hemant Bhagwani, is an Indo-Canadian chef, sommelier, restaurateur, cookbook author, and entrepreneur based in Toronto, Ontario, Canada. Bhagwani has conceptualised, owned and operated over sixty restaurants across North America.

== Education ==
Bhagwani acquired his hotel and culinary management degree from Alpina School of Hotel Management Parpan in Switzerland (1993) and followed it up with an EMBA from the University of Sydney (1994). He completed his professional sommelier certification in Toronto, Canada, in 2002.

== Career ==
Bhagwani started his career by operating food service establishments in Sydney, Australia from 1994 to 1996, and then in Dubai, U.A.E., from 1996 to 2000. In 2000, Bhagwani arrived in Toronto, and within two weeks, started working in CN Tower as Manager, Food and Beverage.

In 2002, he decided to venture out on his own and took over a Hakka Chinese restaurant in Brampton, Ontario. He turned it around and renamed it. He followed it up with Kamasutra restaurant and wine bar in Midtown, Toronto, Canada, in 2003.

In 2007, he opened Amaya the Indian Room on Bayview Avenue, Toronto, and Amaya's Bread Bar in 2008 in midtown Toronto. He expanded the Amaya brand under the name of Amaya Express across Ontario, Canada.

In 2013, Bhagwani created a unique Indian cuisine concept – Marathi, that continues to operate at Terminal 1, Toronto Pearson International Airport.

Bhagwani started a lively Indian restaurant by the name Indian Street Food Company in 2015. He was the first restaurateur in Toronto to institute the policy of no tipping to create an equal work environment. In the summer of the same year, Bhagwani conceptualized and opened Sindi Street Food in Mississauga. Thus, being a serial entrepreneur, he was recognized as a finalist in the 2015 Ernst & Young Entrepreneur of the Year Award. Hemant Bhagwani won his first Michelin Guide's Bib Gourmand award for Indian Street Food Company

In 2016, Bhagwani opened The Fat Beet, blends of Indian, Persian and Middle Eastern cuisine restaurant in Thornhill, Ontario.

On January 25, 2017, Bhagwani opened Leela Indian Food Bar, in The Junction neighbourhood of Toronto. In August of that year, he sold Indian Street Food Co.

In April 2018, Bhagwani launched a new club-themed restaurant, The Kolkata Club, in Mississauga, Ontario.

Bhagwani was mentioned in Forbes online for sharing his entrepreneurial experience. Bhagwani cherishes supporting young entrepreneurs in the hospitality industry.

In the winter of 2018, Bhagwani launched another fast-casual concept, namely Good Karma, a chain specializing in Indian food made from organic and locally sourced ingredients.

Bhagwani is a strong supporter of skilled trades workers in Canada. He advocates and employs hundreds of immigrant staff in his group of companies. He was hailed in media for supporting the immigration of foreign trade workers in Canada. He encourages his staff members as his extended family.

In late 2018, Bhagwani opened an Indian regional cuisine specialty restaurant named Goa Indian Farm Kitchen in Bayview Village Shopping Centre in North York, Toronto. In January 2020, he opened POPA – the first Burmese cuisine restaurant in Toronto at the Bayview Village Shopping Centre.

In March 2020, Bhagwani was in the process of opening an independently run Indian cuisine restaurant at Chef's Assembly Hall when the city of Toronto was put under emergency closure to curtail the spread of COVID-19. He is the first Canadian restaurateur to launch a lawsuit against insurance companies denying COVID-19 claims.

On July 1, 2020, Bhagwani opened a new brunch restaurant named Egg Bird, in Leaside, Toronto.

December 2022, Hemant Bhagwani is all set to bring his style of Indian cuisine to Tribeca, New York at 78 Leonard Street, New York City - the former Tetsu.

March 2023, Toronto celebrity chef Hemant Bhagwani opens Goa New York in the Big Apple.

Bhagwani is the pioneer in establishing Canada's first Indian Omakase-style restaurant in Toronto, Canada - Bar Goa. Continuing the trend set by Goa Indian Farm Kitchen in North York and Goa New York, the St. Lawrence restaurant marks the third installment in a series inspired by Hemant Bhagwani’s travels in the Indian coastal state. Chef and restaurateur Hemant Bhagwani won his second Michelin Guide restaurant for the Bar Goa, Toronto location.

In 2025 Hemant Bhagwani opened EkBar restaurant on Preston Street, Ottawa, Ontario, Canada, at the location formerly occupied by Katha, a modern Indian fine-dining establishment.

After opening over 60 restaurants, chef Hemant Bhagwani is opening another on May 27, 2025. The new restaurant ORO intends to bring global flavors to Trinity Bellwoods, Toronto, Canada.

In 2026, Bhagwani received the Leadership Award of Excellence from Restaurants Canada, recognizing his entrepreneurial leadership and sustained influence on the Canadian restaurant industry. The organization cited his development of more than 60 restaurant concepts across North America and his role in expanding the presence and diversity of South Asian cuisine within Canada’s culinary landscape. Bhagwani also received more nominations than any nominee in the history of Restaurants Canada’s Awards of Excellence, which the organization attributed to his reputation for building teams, developing talent and creating opportunities within the foodservice industry.
