= Sundays (restaurant) =

Restaurant in Uxbridge, Ontario, Canada

- Interactive map of Sundays

Restaurant information
- Established: April 27, 2025
- Owners: Ben Denham; Ashley Lloyd
- Head chef: Ben Denham
- Food type: Canadian; Creative
- Rating: (Michelin Guide); Bib Gourmand (Michelin Guide)
- Location: 58 Brock St West, Uxbridge, Ontario, L9P 1P3, Canada
- Coordinates: 44°6′31″N 79°7′23″W
- Seating capacity: 28
- Website: https://www.sundaysrestaurant.ca/

Sundays is a Michelin Green-starred restaurant located in the Toronto, Ontario suburb of Uxbridge.

== History ==
The restaurant was opened in April 2025 by husband-and-wife couple Ben Denham and Ashley Lloyd. Denham and Lloyd previously owned Michelin-recognized Toronto restaurant White Lily Diner, selling it in fall 2024.

The couple had moved to Uxbridge during the COVID-19 pandemic, and had opened a 10-acre organic farm, White Lily Farms, where they sourced multiple ingredients for their then-restaurant.

== Concept ==
Denham, who serves as the head chef at Sundays, called the restaurant's cuisine "an evolution of White Lily Diner's [menu]" - serving some dishes from their past restaurant with a more refined take. The business is focused on sourcing locally - including from the owner's farm - for their food and drink, including serving beers from a local brewery in Uxbridge.

== Recognition ==
The restaurant was awarded a Michelin Green Star and Bib Gourmand designations by the Michelin Guide at the 2025 ceremony for the Toronto and region. A Green Star is awarded to restaurants that undertake significant sustainability efforts in its cooking, while a Bib Gourmand recognition is awarded to restaurants who offer "exceptionally good food at moderate prices." Michelin highlighted the restaurant's efforts in prominently featuring vegetables, as well as singling out a "particularly satisfying fried pork cutlet".

== See also ==
- List of Michelin Bib Gourmand restaurants in Canada
