= Matty Matheson: Soups, Salads, Sandwiches =

2024 cookbook by Matty Matheson

- Author: Matty Matheson
- Language: English
- Subject: Home Cooking
- Published: 2024
- Publisher: Ten Speed Press
- Publication place: United States of America
- Media type: Hardcover
- Pages: 368
- ISBN: 9781984862150

Matty Matheson: Soups, Salads, Sandwiches is a 2024 cookbook by Canadian chef Matty Matheson. It is a follow-up to his Matty Matheson: Home Style Cookery.

== Reception ==
The book was released to positive reviews. Tertulia named the cookbook one of the Top 22 cookbooks of 2024.
