= Melba (restaurant) =

Restaurant in Quebec City, Canada

- Interactive map of Melba

Restaurant information
- Established: 2022
- Owner: Guillaume St-Pierre
- Head chef: Charles Provencher Proulx; Alexandra Roy
- Food type: French
- Rating: Bib Gourmand (Michelin Guide)
- Location: 398 rue Saint-Vallier Ouest, Quebec City, Quebec, Canada
- Coordinates: 46°48′43″N 71°14′21″W
- Website: restaurantmelba.ca

Melba is a French restaurant in the Saint-Sauveur neighbourhood of Quebec City, Canada.

== History ==
The business opened in late 2022, started by Guillaume St-Pierre. St. Pierre is known for being the chef-owner of popular Quebec City Italian restaurant Battuto. Charles Provencher Proulx and Alexandra Roy serve as the restaurant's co-head chefs.

Melba was opened and operates in the Saint-Sauveur neighbourhood, outside of the popular parts of the city more known for high-end restaurants. St. Pierre cited wanting to open the restaurant in the neighbourhood due to it being perceived as 'emerging'.

Melba, similar to other fine dining restaurants in the city, is known for relying on the nearby boreal forests to source ingredients for its dishes, including fresh whelks and fiddleheads. Unlike many popular restaurants in North America, Melba is closed on the weekends, only being open Monday through Friday.

== Recognition ==
In 2025, the business received a 'Bib Gourmand' designation in Quebec's inaugural Michelin Guide. Per the guide, a Bib Gourmand recognition is awarded to restaurants who offer "exceptionally good food at moderate prices." Michelin described the restaurant as "an authentic slice of gourmet France", singling out the desserts as "pure indulgence".

La Presse restaurants columnist Eve Dumas stated the dishes served at Melba were both mouthwatering and attractive, while mentioning the drink list was small, but sufficient.

Le Journal de Quebec restaurant critic Marianne White praised the canape and sharing plate focus in the dishes, including fusing French dishes with local Quebecois ingredients.

US-based food publication Eater listed Melba among its "28 Best Restaurants in Quebec City," highlighting its "simple yet superbly refined dishes," alongside wine list with more obscure and rare types.

=== Canada's 100 Best Restaurants Ranking ===
Melba debuted on Canada's 100 Best Restaurants list in 2025, at #98.

Melba
Year	Rank	Change
2025	98	new
2026	▼ No Rank	

== See also ==
- List of Michelin Bib Gourmand restaurants in Canada
