= Grey Gardens (disambiguation) =

Grey Gardens is a 1975 documentary film.

Grey Gardens may also refer to:

- Grey Gardens (estate), the residence of the Beale family from 1924 to 1979, and the setting for the documentary film
- Grey Gardens (musical), a stage musical based on the documentary, first produced in 2006
- Grey Gardens (2009 film), an adaptation of the documentary, starring Drew Barrymore and Jessica Lange
- Grey Gardens (restaurant), a Toronto, Ontario establishment opened in 2017
- Donald Gray Gardens, an area of Cleveland Stadium from 1936 to 1997
- "Grey Gardens", a song by Rufus Wainwright on the 2001 album Poses
- Grey Wardens, a warrior order in the BioWare video game Dragon Age
