= Farmer's Apprentice =

Restaurant in Vancouver, British Columbia, Canada

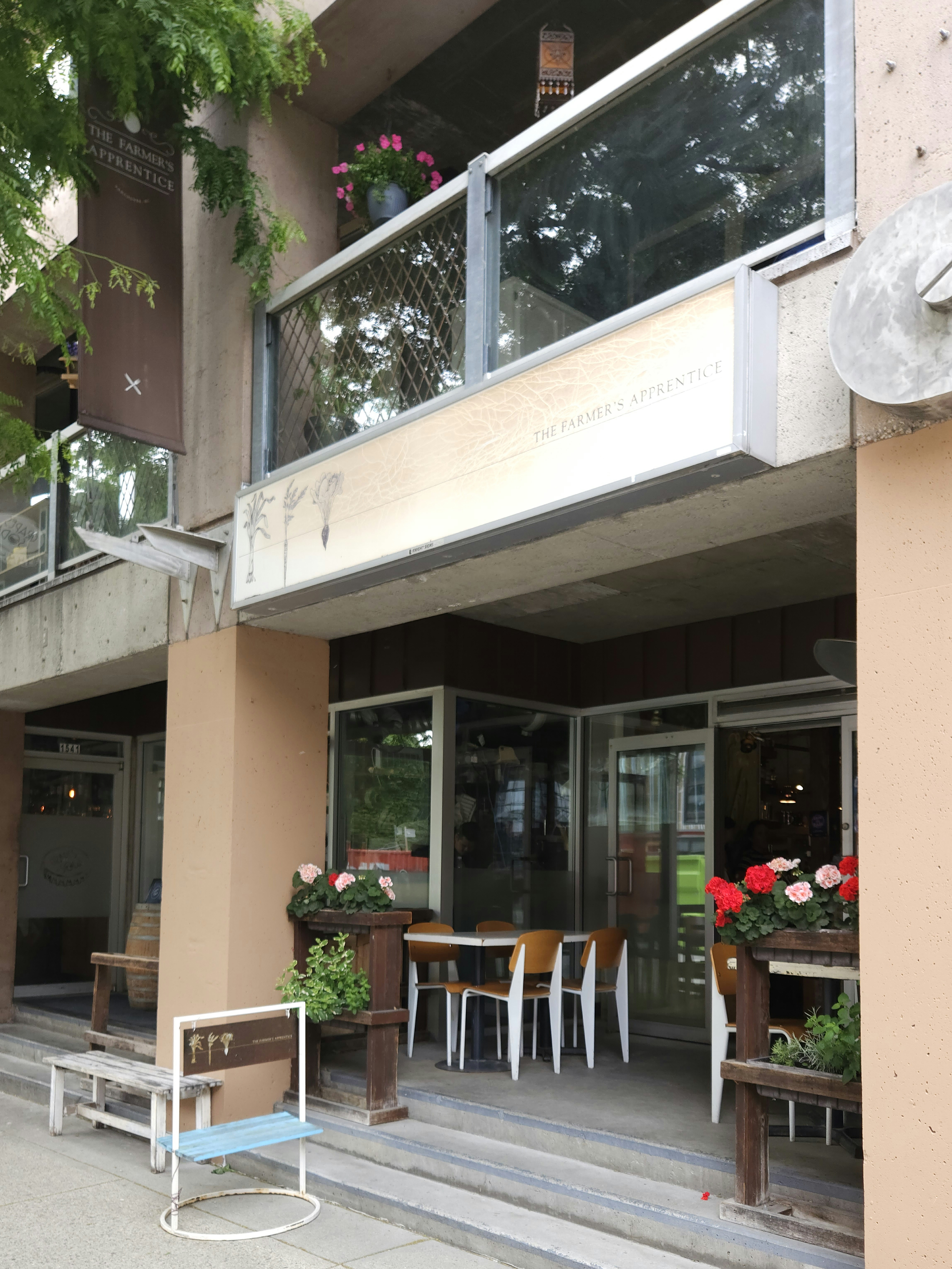
- The restaurant's exterior, 2025
- Interactive map of Farmer's Apprentice

Restaurant information
- Location: 1535 West 6th Avenue, Vancouver, British Columbia, Canada
- Coordinates: 49°15′59″N 123°8′23″W
- Website: https://farmersapprentice.ca/

Farmer's Apprentice is a restaurant in Vancouver, British Columbia, Canada.

Neighboring Grapes & Soda has been described as a "sister" wine bar.

== History ==
The restaurant opened in 2013.

David Gunawan has been a chef at Farmer's Apprentice.

== Reception ==
Canada's 100 Best Restaurants Ranking:

Farmer's Apprentice
Year	Rank	Change
2015	72	new
2016	33	▲39
2017	▼ No Rank	
2018	▼ No Rank	
2019	▼ No Rank	
2020	▼ No Rank	
2021	No List	
2022	▼ No Rank	
2023	▼ No Rank	
2024	▼ No Rank	
2025	▼ No Rank	
2026	▼ No Rank	

== See also ==
- List of Michelin Bib Gourmand restaurants in Canada
- List of restaurants in Vancouver
