= Fonda Balam =

Former Mexican restaurant in Toronto, Ontario, Canada

Coordinates: 43.6517°N 79.4086°W

- Interactive map of Fonda Balam

Restaurant information
- Established: October 2, 2021
- Closed: June 8, 2024
- Owner: Matty Matheson
- Head chef: Kate Chomyshyn; Julio Guajardo
- Food type: Mexican
- Rating: Bib Gourmand (Michelin Guide, 2022-2023)
- Location: 802 Dundas Street West, Toronto, Ontario, Canada

Fonda Balam was a Mexican restaurant that operated in the Little Italy neighbourhood of Toronto, Ontario. It was owned by celebrity chef Matty Matheson.

== History ==
In April 2021, Toronto-based celebrity chef and restauranteur Matty Matheson collaborated with chefs Kate Chomyshyn and Julio Guajardo, formerly of Michelin-starred restaurant Quetzal, to launch a pop-up restaurant named Birria Balam in Toronto. The pop-up specialized in birria, a traditional Mexican dish. The trio stated the concept evolved through their friendship, "love for authentic Mexican food," and exploration of regional ingredients through Chomyshyn and Guajardo's extensive travels in Mexico.

Later that year, in October 2021, the trio opened a permanent establishment, Fonda Balam, located near the Trinity Bellwoods and Little Italy neighbourhoods in Toronto. Fonda Balam expanded its menu to include birria and a variety of other Mexican dishes.

In May 2024, head chefs Chomyshyn and Guajardo announced the restaurant would be closing at the end of the month. The closing was considered abrupt, and no specific reason for the shut down was publicly communicated.

== Recognition ==
The restaurant was awarded a Bib Gourmand designation by the Michelin Guide at Toronto's 2022 Michelin Guide ceremony, and retained this recognition in 2023. A Bib Gourmand is awarded to restaurants who offer "exceptionally good food at moderate prices." Michelin particularly highlighted the restaurant's lengua and birria tacos, as well as their homemade tortillas.

== See also ==
- List of Michelin Bib Gourmand restaurants in Canada
