= Indian Street Food Company =

Indian restaurant in Toronto, Ontario, Canada

Coordinates: 43.7079°N 79.3759°W

- Interactive map of Indian Street Food Company

Restaurant information
- Established: September 1, 2015
- Owner: Hoshang Bakshi
- Previous owner: Hemant Bhagwani
- Head chef: Yatin Bhatia
- Food type: Indian
- Rating: Bib Gourmand (Michelin Guide)
- Location: 1701 Bayview Avenue, Toronto, Ontario, Canada
- Website: www.indianstreetfoodco.com

Indian Street Food Company is an Indian restaurant located in the Leaside neighbourhood of Toronto's midtown.

== History ==
The business was established in 2015 by Hemant Bhagwani, a Toronto-based restaurateur best known for founding the fast-casual Indian restaurant chain Amaya Express. Before the opening of Indian Street Food Company, the location was home to another of Bhagwani's establishments, Amaya The Indian Room, a more upscale counterpart to the Amaya Express chain.

The restaurant specializes in street food dishes and regional curries representing diverse cuisines from across India. Bhagwani, who was born and raised in New Delhi, India, envisioned the restaurant as a blend of family recipes and the snacks one would commonly find sold at Indian railway stations.

At the time of its opening the restaurant featured three co-chefs, each overseeing a specific aspect of the culinary process. One chef responsible for the 'street food station', one managing the tandoor (an Indian style clay oven), and another operating the 'hot range' (preparing curries).

In summer 2017, Bhagwani sold ownership of the restaurant, citing his wish to retire from the restaurant business. The restaurant is presently owned by Hoshang Bakshi, an Afghan immigrant to Canada who purchased the business in late 2019.

As of 2025, Yatin Bhatia is the restaurant's head chef.

=== No Tipping Policy ===
The restaurant received significant local media attention for its strict no-tipping policy at opening, straying from the norm of most sit-down restaurants in Canada and North America at the time. In lieu of tipping, the restaurant charges a flat 12% administrative charge which Bhagwani cited would be used to ensure employees received a fair wage, alongside splitting a share of the restaurant's daily revenue. Indian Street Food Company was the first sit-down restaurant in Toronto to publicly institute a no-tipping policy.

== Recognition ==
The business was named a Bib Gourmand restaurant by the Michelin Guide at Toronto's 2022 Michelin Guide ceremony, and has retained this recognition each year following. A Bib Gourmand recognition is awarded to restaurants who offer "exceptionally good food at moderate prices." The Guide cited the deep-fried cauliflower with sweet chili glaze as a kitchen speciality, as well as highlighting the restaurant's chaat and thali platters.

The Globe and Mail praised the restaurant for its inventive menu, highlighting standout dishes like the "chaat on wheels," eggplant fries, and tandoori lamb chops, including noting its use of bold flavors and focus on diverse regions of India. However, the review also suggested the restaurant was playing catch-up to newer, more innovative Indian spots in Toronto.

== See also ==
- List of Michelin Bib Gourmand restaurants in Canada
