= Grey Gardens (restaurant) =

Restaurant in Toronto, Ontario, Canada

- Interactive map of Grey Gardens

Restaurant information
- Established: February 15, 2017
- Owners: Jen Agg; Mitch Bates
- Head chef: AJ Lapointe
- Food type: Contemporary
- Rating: Bib Gourmand (Michelin Guide)
- Location: 199 Augusta Avenue, Toronto, Ontario, Canada
- Coordinates: 43.6538°N 79.4015°W
- Seating capacity: 55
- Website: greygardens.ca

Grey Gardens is a restaurant and wine bar in the Kensington Market neighbourhood of Toronto, Ontario, Canada.

== History ==
The restaurant opened in February 2017, and is owned by Toronto restauranteur Jen Agg, who is known for her previous restaurant venture 'The Black Hoof'. It serves contemporary cuisine, offering a seasonal a la carte menu. Agg cited the restaurant was looking to fill the hole of "vibrant wine bars with excellent food," which she felt was lacking in Toronto at the time of opening.

At opening, the kitchen was headed by executive chef and co-owner Mitch Bates, who previously led the kitchen at Michelin-starred Momofuku Ko and former Toronto restaurant Shoto, which were both a part of David Chang's Momofuku group of restaurants.

== Recognition ==
The business was named a Bib Gourmand restaurant by the Michelin Guide at Toronto's 2022 Michelin Guide ceremony, and has retained this recognition each year following. A Bib Gourmand recognition is awarded to restaurants who offer "exceptionally good food at moderate prices." Michelin cited the restaurant's "excellent wine list" and the house-made pastas as a "showstopper".

=== Canada's 100 Best Restaurants Ranking ===
Grey Gardens
Year	Rank	Change
2018	43	new
2019	▼ No Rank	
2020	▼ No Rank	
2021	No List	
2022	▼ No Rank	
2023	▼ No Rank	
2024	▼ No Rank	
2025	▼ No Rank	

== See also ==
- List of Michelin Bib Gourmand restaurants in Canada
