= Puerto Bravo =

Mexican restaurant in Toronto, Ontario, Canada

- Interactive map of Puerto Bravo

Restaurant information
- Established: August 1, 2021
- Owner: Luis Bautista
- Head chef: Luis Bautista
- Rating: Bib Gourmand (Michelin Guide)
- Location: 1425 Gerrard Street East, Toronto, Ontario, Canada
- Coordinates: 43.672°N 79.3224°W
- Seating capacity: 35
- Reservations: by call only
- Website: puertobravo.ca

Puerto Bravo is a Mexican restaurant in The Beaches neighbourhood of Toronto, Ontario, Canada.

== History ==
The restaurant focuses on regional cuisine from Mexico’s northeast coast, more specifically the Tampico area near the Gulf of Mexico. It has a heavy focus on seafood, including serving seafood tacos with ingredients such as octopus and shrimp.

The owner of the restaurant, Luis Bautista have background in the culinary sector, working across Mexico and the Toronto-area before opening Puerto Bravo. Originally conceived as a fine-dining establishment, the restaurant's owners shifted their focus during the COVID-19 pandemic, opting for a more casual dining experience upon its opening in August 2021. Owner Bautista has expressed a desire to eventually return to the restaurant's initial fine-dining vision, with the aim of achieving a Michelin star.

== Recognition ==
The business was named a Bib Gourmand restaurant by the Michelin Guide at Toronto's 2022 Michelin Guide ceremony, and has retained this recognition each year following. A Bib Gourmand recognition is awarded to restaurants who offer "exceptionally good food at moderate prices." Michelin spotlighted the restaurant's compact menu, commending the octopus taco.

== See also ==
- List of Michelin Bib Gourmand restaurants in Canada
