= Mhel =

Korean restaurant in Toronto, Ontario, Canada

- Interactive map of Mhel

Restaurant information
- Established: 2023
- Owners: Young Hoon Ji; Seung-Min Yi
- Head chef: Young Hoon Ji
- Food type: Korean; Japanese
- Rating: Bib Gourmand (Michelin Guide)
- Location: 276 Havelock St., Toronto, Ontario, M6H 3B9, Canada
- Coordinates: 43.6602°N 79.4324°W
- Seating capacity: 30

Mhel is a restaurant and sake bar located in Toronto, Ontario's west end, known for its Korean and Japanese cuisine.

== History ==
Chef-owners Young Hoon Ji and Seung-Min Yi, who are also husband-and-wife, started the restaurant in summer 2023. Prior to opening Mhel, the couple spent six months working in South Korea's culinary scene to immerse themselves in the country's restaurant culture.

The restaurant's name Mhel, is the Korean Jeju dialect's word for anchovy, calling back to the ingredient's historic significance in many seaside Korean households.

== Concept ==
The restaurant's menu changes daily, offering around a dozen dishes that take influence from Korean and Japanese culinary techniques and ingredients. The restaurant has a focus on sourcing ingredients from local producers, but also imports some speciality ingredients from Japan and South Korea, including its koshihikari rice and wild sesame.

Mhel is known for its curated sake list. While it does not offer set sake pairings, the staff are trained to offer recommendations for sake that may go well with certain dishes.

It offers both counter seating facing the open kitchen and regular table seating.

== Recognition ==
The restaurant was ranked #2 in Air Canada's annual list of 10 best new restaurants in Canada in 2024. Air Canada highlighted the restaurant's purin, a Japanese-take on crème caramel, as the best dessert from the restaurants it reviewed that year.

In 2024, Mhel was ranked #1 by Toronto Life magazine on its annual list of the best new restaurants in the city.

Toronto Star restaurant critic Karon Liu praised Mhel for its seasonal menu, highlighting dishes such as the agebitashi and charcoal-grilled kanpachi, and described the restaurant as an ideal date night spot.

In 2025, the restaurant was awarded a Michelin Bib Gourmand designation by the Michelin Guide at that year's ceremony for the Toronto and region. A Bib Gourmand recognition is awarded to restaurants who offer "exceptionally good food at moderate prices." Michelin praised the restaurant as the "kind of place that's just right for a midweek meal", singling out its attention to detail in the dishes and the sake selections offered.

Mhel was ranked #44 in the inaugural North America's 50 Best Restaurants list in 2025, one of two Toronto restaurants making the ranking alongside Quetzal. In the 2026 publication, the restaurant ranked #28.

=== Canada's 100 Best Restaurants Ranking ===
Mhel debuted on Canada's 100 Best Restaurants list in 2025, at #81.

Mhel
Year	Rank	Change
2025	81	new
2026	30	▲51

== See also ==
- List of Michelin Bib Gourmand restaurants in Canada
