= Conejo Negro =

Restaurant in Toronto, Ontario, Canada

- Interactive map of Conejo Negro

Restaurant information
- Established: November 1, 2023
- Owners: Diego Diaz; Lamine Martindale; Alycia Wahn
- Manager: Lamine Martindale
- Head chef: Alycia Wahn
- Food type: Caribbean; Creole; Latin American
- Rating: Bib Gourmand (Michelin Guide)
- Location: 838 College Street, Toronto, Ontario, Canada
- Coordinates: 43.6544295°N 79.4230561°W
- Website: conejonegrotoronto.com

Conejo Negro (English: Black Rabbit) is a restaurant located in the Little Italy neighbourhood of Toronto, Ontario, Canada.

== History ==
The restaurant opened in November 2023, serving a combination of Caribbean, Creole, and Latin American cuisine. It is co-owned by three friends: Alycia Wahn, who runs the kitchen; Diego Diaz, who oversees the bar; and Lamine Martindale, who manages the service.

The business's name, Conejo Negro (Spanish for "black rabbit") references the Chinese Zodiac symbol for the year the restaurant opened, 2023.

Wahn cites her time living in Southern United States cities Memphis, Nashville, and New Orleans as influences in her creations, including the Creole spice mix used in many dishes. The restaurant seeks to make the majority of its dishes from scratch, including house-made butter.

== Recognition ==
The business was named a Bib Gourmand restaurant by the Michelin Guide at Toronto's 2024 Michelin Guide ceremony, one of four new awardees that year. A Bib Gourmand recognition is awarded to restaurants who offer "exceptionally good food at moderate prices." In its review, Michelin commended the restaurant's "generously portioned" Creole, Caribbean and Latin cuisine, including spiced firecracker shrimp, braised beef, and fried chicken. The restaurant's co-owner and general manager, Lamine Martindale, also won Michelin's 'Service Award' at the 2024 Toronto ceremony.

The restaurant also made Toronto Life magazine's annual list of Toronto's best new restaurants in 2024.

== See also ==
- List of Michelin Bib Gourmand restaurants in Canada
