= Honō Izakaya =

Japanese izakaya in Quebec City, Canada

Restaurant information
- Established: June 1, 2018
- Owners: Patrick Beaulieu; Ariane Boudreau; Thomas Casault; Julien Vézina
- Head chef: Jean-Christophe Comtois
- Food type: Japanese
- Rating: Bib Gourmand (Michelin Guide)
- Location: 670 rue Saint-Joseph Est, Quebec City, Quebec, Canada
- Seating capacity: 48
- Website: izakaya.honorestos.com

Honō Izakaya is a Japanese-style izakaya in the Saint-Roch neighbourhood of Quebec City, Canada.

== History ==
The business opened in early 2018, and is owned by Patrick Beaulieu, Ariane Boudreau, Thomas Casault and Julien Vézina. The owners cited wanting to open a Japanese restaurant focusing on a different aspect of the cuisine, and differing from the ramen that is commonly found in the city, instead focusing on yakitori.

Louis Philippe Moisan served as the head chef of the izakaya in its earlier year of operation. As of December 2023, Jean-Christophe Comtois runs the restaurant kitchen.

In its earlier years the restaurant was walk-in only, but now recommends reservations.

The izakaya's sister restaurant focused on ramen, Honō Ramen, is located next door. The ramen shop, which opened in 2021, has been listed by US-based food publication Eater among its "28 Best Restaurants in Quebec City," while also highlighting Honō Izakaya as a place worth checking out.

== Recognition ==
In 2025, the business received a 'Bib Gourmand' designation in Quebec's inaugural Michelin Guide. Per the guide, a Bib Gourmand recognition is awarded to restaurants who offer "exceptionally good food at moderate prices." Michelin praised the grill-focused cooking, singling out three dishes as house specialities: miso-marinated salmon, house-made chicken sausage and confit duck heart.

The New York Times recommended a visit to Honō Izakaya in its travel write-up of Quebec City, highlighting its duck heart confit yakitori and Japanese curry as dishes to try.

CBC and Radio-Canada food writer Allison Van Rassel described the restaurant as "accessible and unpretentious", mentioning the karaage and kakiage as favourite dishes.

Montreal based culinary magazine Tastet mentions both the yakitori-focused food menu and the "unique cocktail menu" as worth checking out at the restaurant.

=== Canada's 50 Best Bars Ranking ===
Honō Izakaya has made one appearance on Canada's 50 Best Bars list in 2020, at #29, before falling off the ranking in the next publication in 2022.

Honō Izakaya
Year	Rank	Change
2020	29	new
2021	No List	
2022	▼ No Rank	
2023	▼ No Rank	
2024	▼ No Rank	
2025	▼ No Rank	

== See also ==
- List of Michelin Bib Gourmand Restaurants in Canada
