= Matty Matheson: Home Style Cookery =

2020 cookbook by Matty Matheson

- First edition
- Author: Matty Matheson
- Language: English
- Subject: Home Cooking
- Published: September 29, 2020
- Publisher: Harry N. Abrams
- Publication place: United States of America
- Media type: Hardcover
- Pages: 368
- ISBN: 1419747487

Matty Matheson: Home Style Cookery is a 2020 cookbook by Canadian chef Matty Matheson. It is a follow-up to his New York Times Bestseller Matty Matheson: A Cookbook.

== Reception ==
Men's Health named the cookbook one of the Top 10 cookbooks of 2020.
