= Cherry St. Bar-B-Que =

BBQ restaurant in Toronto, Ontario, Canada

- Interactive map of Cherry St. Bar-B-Que

Restaurant information
- Established: July 1, 2016
- Owner: Lawrence La Pianta
- Head chef: Lawrence La Pianta
- Food type: American Barbecue; Southern
- Rating: Bib Gourmand (Michelin Guide)
- Location: 275 Cherry Street, Toronto, Ontario, Canada
- Coordinates: 43.6456°N 79.3523°W
- Seating capacity: 60
- Website: www.cherrystbbq.com

Cherry St. Bar-B-Que is a barbecue restaurant located in the Port Lands area of Toronto, Ontario, Canada.

== History ==
The restaurant opened in 2016, in a 1920s-built former Dominion Bank location that previously hosted the Cherry Street Restaurant. The owner and head pitmaster is Lawrence La Pianta, who spent years competing and judging on the Kansas City Barbeque Society circuit, the largest barbecue circuit in the world.

All of the barbecue offerings at the restaurant are smoked using white oak on the patio, located inside a redesigned shipping container. The restaurant also often hosts Sunday pig roasts, featuring guest pitmasters from other barbecue joints in North America.

== Recognition ==
The business was named a Bib Gourmand restaurant by the Michelin Guide at Toronto's 2022 Michelin Guide ceremony, and has retained this recognition each year following. A Bib Gourmand recognition is awarded to restaurants who offer "exceptionally good food at moderate prices." Michelin highlighted the restaurant's various barbecue offerings, including its Texas-style brisket and St. Louis-style ribs.

== See also ==
- List of Michelin Bib Gourmand restaurants in Canada
