= Tiflisi (restaurant) =

Restaurant in Toronto, Ontario, Canada

- Interactive map of Tiflisi

Restaurant information
- Established: April 2021
- Food type: Georgian; Central Asian
- Rating: Bib Gourmand (Michelin Guide)
- Location: 1970 Queen Street East, Toronto, Ontario, Canada
- Coordinates: 43°40′11.4″N 79°18′5.7″W

Tiflisi is a Georgian restaurant in Toronto, Ontario, Canada. Established in 2021, the business was named a Bib Gourmand restaurant by the Michelin Guide in 2023.

== Description ==
Tiflisi is a family-owned restaurant on Queen Street in the Beaches. The Georgian (also sometimes described as Central Asian) menu includes khachapuri, lavash, and Georgian-style barbecue platters, as well as beef, cheese, and lamb varieties of khinkali.

== History ==
The restaurant opened in April 2021.

== Reception ==
The business was named a Bib Gourmand restaurant by the Michelin Guide in 2023, and has retained this recognition each year following.

== See also ==
- List of Michelin Bib Gourmand restaurants in Canada
