= Guru Lukshmi =

South Indian restaurant in Mississauga, Ontario, Canada

Coordinates: 43.6392°N 79.7160°W

- Interactive map of Guru Lukshmi

Restaurant information
- Established: 2003
- Owners: Kumar Gurutharan; Thana Lakshmi
- Food type: South Indian; Vegetarian
- Rating: Bib Gourmand (Michelin Guide)
- Location: 50-7070 St Barbara Blvd, Mississauga, Ontario, Canada
- Website: www.gurulukshmi.com

Guru Lukshmi is a South Indian restaurant located in Mississauga, Ontario.

== History ==
The restaurant was opened in 2003, originally being located inside a food court in Mississauga's Erin Mills neighbourhood before moving to a suburban strip mall in the Meadowvale neighbourhood as a standalone restaurant. It is owned and operated by husband-and-wife couple Kumar Gurutharan and Thana Lakshmi, with the restaurant's name being a portmanteau of the couple's surnames.

Gurutharan, an immigrant to Canada from the South Indian state of Tamil Nadu, cites his grandmother as his 'kitchen mentor' for the dishes served by the restaurant. It serves an exclusively vegetarian menu of South Indian staples, including idli, sambhar, and uttapam. The restaurant is well-known for its large variety of dosa styles served, from traditional South Indian classics like masala dosa and paper dosa, to more modern twists served with marinara and mozzarella to Nutella and M&M's.

In accordance with South Indian culinary traditions, many of the dishes served at the restaurant are designed to be eaten by hand.

== Recognition ==
The business was named a Bib Gourmand restaurant by the Michelin Guide at Toronto's 2024 Michelin Guide ceremony, and retained this designation in 2025. A Bib Gourmand recognition is awarded to restaurants who offer "exceptionally good food at moderate prices." The restaurant, alongside Berkeley North in Hamilton, became the first restaurants to receive a Bib Gourmand designation in Ontario outside of Toronto's city limits. Michelin praised the restaurant as "the undisputed champion of dosas" in the region, highlighting its signature Mysore Bhaji Dosa that is stuffed with aloo masala.

Food critic Chris Nuttall-Smith, writing for Maclean's, called the restaurant "one of the suburbs’ toughest reservations."

== See also ==
- List of Michelin Bib Gourmand restaurants in Canada
