= Prime Seafood Palace =

- Interactive map of Prime Seafood Palace

Restaurant information
- Chef: Matty Matheson
- Food type: Seafood
- Location: Toronto, Ontario, Canada

Prime Seafood Palace is a seafood restaurant in Toronto, Ontario, Canada. Matty Matheson is the chef.

== Recognition ==
=== Canada's 100 Best Restaurants Ranking ===
The restaurant debuted on Canada's 100 Best Restaurants list in its 2023 edition. As of the 2026 edition, it is ranked #41.

Prime Seafood Palace
Year	Rank	Change
2023	17	new
2024	18	▼1
2025	80	▼62
2026	41	▲39

== See also ==
- List of restaurants in Canada
- List of seafood restaurants
