= Campechano (restaurant) =

Mexican taqueria in Toronto, Ontario, Canada

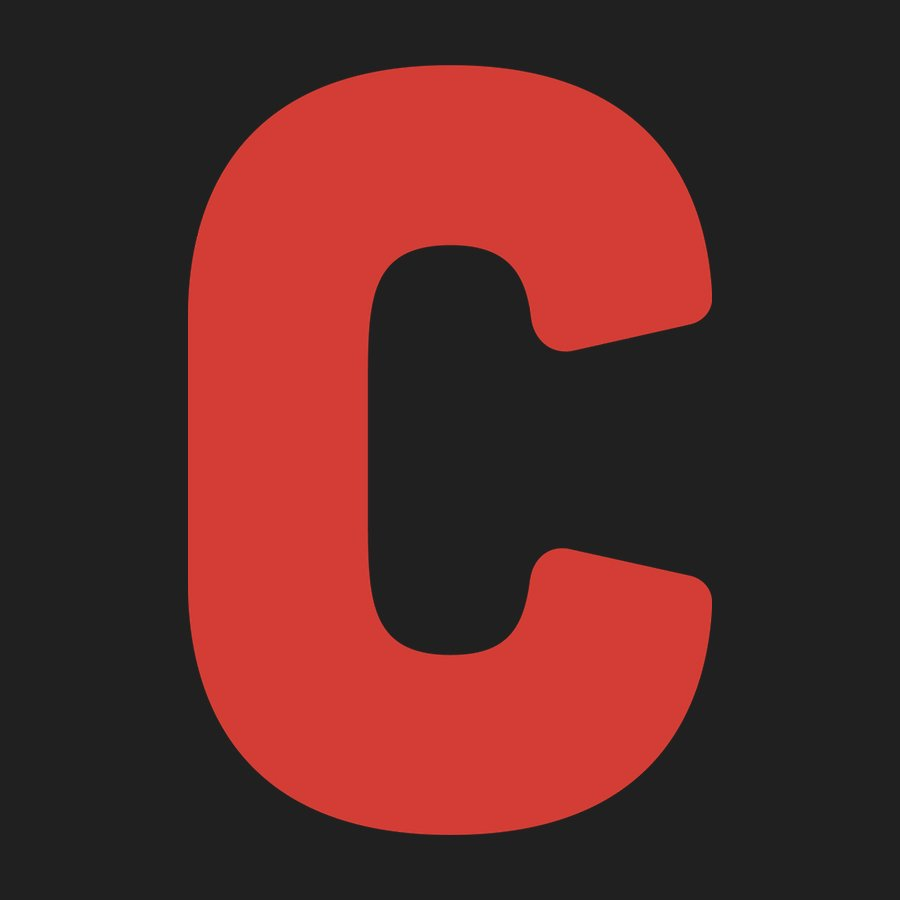
- Interactive map of Campechano

Restaurant information
- Established: November 9, 2015
- Owners: Daniel Roe; Raena Fisher
- Head chef: Daniel Roe
- Food type: Mexican
- Rating: Bib Gourmand (Michelin Guide)
- Location: 504 Adelaide Street, Toronto, Ontario, Canada
- Coordinates: 43.6458°N 79.4008°W
- Seating capacity: 43
- Other locations: 460 College Street
- Website: campechano.ca

Campechano is a chain of Mexican taquerias operating in Toronto, Ontario, Canada.

== History ==
The restaurant's first location, on Toronto's Adelaide Street in the downtown Fashion District was established in November 2015. It was opened by couple Daniel Roe and Raena Fisher, who sought to highlight a simple menu of 'real Mexican food'.

Co-owner and head chef Roe was born and raised in Mexico City, before moving to Canada in 2005. He sought "to serve the tacos [he's] been eating [his] whole life" at the restaurant. The restaurant uses imported heirloom corn from Mexico to make their tortillas, which are made fresh throughout the day and are never reheated. According to Roe, it took six months for him to perfect the tortilla recipe being used at the restaurant.

The restaurant's name Campechano, comes from the Spanish word for 'good-natured' or 'cheerful'.

A second location was opened in summer 2021 on College Street in Toronto's Little Italy neighbourhood. The College Street location is larger and provides more seating for patrons, but offers a similar menu.

== Recognition ==
The chain's original location on Adelaide Street was awarded a Bib Gourmand designation by the Michelin Guide at Toronto's 2022 Michelin Guide ceremony, and has retained this recognition each year following. A Bib Gourmand is awarded to restaurants who offer "exceptionally good food at moderate prices." The guide praised the restaurant's small menu of tacos, stating that "if you’re here for anything [else], you’ve come to the wrong place."

== See also ==
- List of Michelin Bib Gourmand restaurants in Canada
