= List of Michelin Bib Gourmand restaurants in Canada =

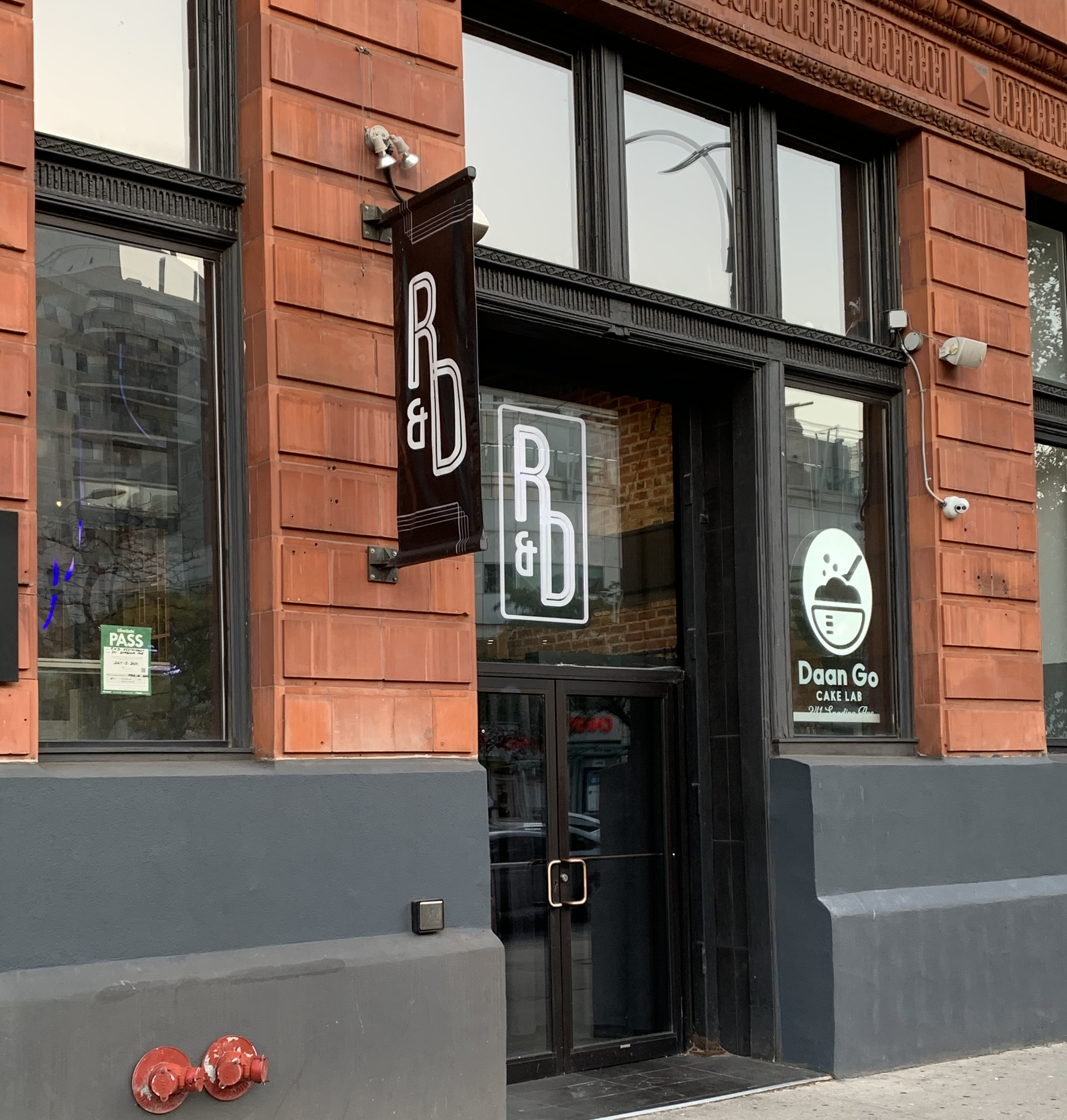
Exterior of the restaurant R&D in Toronto in 2024

A total of 70 restaurants in Canada presently have a Michelin Bib Gourmand recognition - 31 in the Toronto area, 23 in the province of Quebec, and 16 in the city of Vancouver.

The Michelin Guides have been published by the French tire company Michelin since 1900. They were designed as a guide to tell drivers about eateries they recommended to visit and to subtly sponsor their tires, by encouraging drivers to use their cars more and therefore need to replace the tires as they wore out. The Michelin Bib Gourmand designation debuted internationally in 1997 and highlights restaurants offering "exceptionally good food at moderate prices". They must offer menu items priced below a maximum determined by local economic standards. In Canada, a Bib Gourmand restaurant must be able to offer a two-course meal and either dessert or a glass of wine for less than $60 CAD per person.

Per Michelin's own rating system, the Bib Gourmand is considered "Not quite a star, but most definitely not a consolation prize" and a "just-as-esteemed rating." As with Michelin stars, restaurants can also lose their Bib Gourmand designation. Bib Gourmand restaurants are assessed often by Michelin's inspectors, and must meet the required standards to remain on the list.

Three regions are covered by the Michelin Guide in Canada:

- Quebec: covering the Province of Quebec
- Toronto and Region: covering the City of Toronto, its suburbs and portions of Southern Ontario
- Vancouver: covering the City of Vancouver

The Toronto and Vancouver guides launched separately in September 2022, and update annually each autumn. The Quebec guide launched in May 2025, and updates annually each spring.

== Quebec ==
As of the 2026 Michelin Guide, there are 23 restaurants in Quebec with a Bib Gourmand rating.

Key
✅	Indicates a restaurant with a Michelin Bib Gourmand designation
—	The restaurant did not receive a Bib Gourmand that year

Name	Cuisine	Location	2025	2026
Annette bar à vin	Quebecois	Montreal – Rosemont	✅	✅
Battuto	Italian	Quebec City – Saint-Roch	✅	✅
Baumier	Canadian	Piedmont	—	✅
Bibine Buvette	Quebecois	Drummondville	—	✅
Bistro B	French	Quebec City – La Cité	✅	✅
Buvette Gentille	Quebecois	Baie-Saint-Paul	—	✅
Buvette Scott	Quebecois	Quebec City – La Cité	✅	✅
Cadet	Modern	Montreal – Ville-Marie	✅	✅
Casavant	French	Montreal – Villeray	✅	✅
Coquette	Quebecois	Sainte-Anne-de-Beaupré	—	✅
Côté Est	Quebecois	Kamouraska	✅	✅
Honō Izakaya	Japanese	Quebec City – Saint-Roch	✅	✅
L'Express	French	Montreal – Le Plateau	✅	—
Le Clocher Penché	Quebecois	Quebec City – Saint-Roch	—	✅
Le Petit Alep	Syrian / Armenian	Montreal – Villeray	✅	✅
Limbo	French	Montreal – La Petite-Patrie	—	✅
Losange	Quebecois	Rimouski	✅	✅
lueur	Modern	Quebec City – La Cité	✅	✅
Melba	French	Quebec City – Saint-Sauveur	✅	✅
Ouroboros	Modern	Quebec City – Saint-Roch	✅	✅
Parapluie	French	Montreal – La Petite-Patrie	✅	✅
Rôtisserie La Lune	Quebecois	Montreal – La Petite-Patrie	✅	✅
Saindoux Restaurant BBQ	Southern	Sainte-Marie	—	✅
Torii Izakaya	Japanese / French	Quebec City – Saint-Roch	✅	✅
Reference				

== Toronto and Region ==
As of the 2026 Michelin Guide, there are 31 restaurants in Greater Toronto with a Bib Gourmand rating.

Key
✅	Indicates a restaurant with a Michelin Bib Gourmand designation
—	The restaurant did not receive a Bib Gourmand that year
Closed	The restaurant is no longer open

Name	Cuisine	Location	2022	2023	2024	2025	2026
7 Enoteca	Italian	Oakville	—	—	—	✅	✅
Alma	Chinese / Hakka	Toronto – West End	✅	✅	✅	✅	✅
Antylia	Ecuadorian / Mexican	Toronto – West End	—	—	—	—	✅
Bar Raval	Spanish	Toronto – West End	✅	✅	✅	✅	✅
Barrel Heart Brewing	Brewery	Hamilton	—	—	—	✅	✅
BB's	Filipino	Toronto – Parkdale	—	✅	✅	✅	✅
Berkeley North	American	Hamilton	—	—	✅	—	—
Campechano	Mexican	Toronto – Downtown	✅	✅	✅	✅	✅
Cherry Street Bar-B-Que	Southern	Toronto – Riverdale	✅	✅	✅	✅	✅
Chica's Chicken	Southern	Toronto – York	✅	✅	✅	✅	✅
Conejo Negro	Cajun / Caribbean	Toronto – West End	—	—	✅	✅	✅
Enoteca Sociale	Italian	Toronto – West End	✅	✅	✅	✅	✅
Fat Pasha	Israeli	Toronto – Midtown	✅	✅	—	—	—
Favorites Thai	Thai	Toronto – West End	✅	✅	✅	✅	✅
Fonda Balam	Mexican	Toronto – Downtown	✅	✅	Closed		
Golden Horseshoe Barbecue	Southern	Toronto – Midtown	—	—	—	—	✅
Grey Gardens	Contemporary	Toronto – Downtown	✅	✅	✅	✅	✅
Guru Lukshmi	Indian	Mississauga	—	—	✅	✅	✅
Indian Street Food Company	Indian	Toronto – Midtown	✅	✅	✅	✅	✅
La Bartola	Mexican / Vegan	Toronto – West End	✅	✅	✅	Closed	
Les Incompetents	French	St. Catharines	—	—	—	—	✅
Mhel	Korean / Japanese	Toronto – West End	—	—	—	✅	✅
Puerto Bravo	Mexican	Toronto – The Beaches	✅	✅	✅	✅	✅
R&D	Asian Fusion	Toronto – Downtown	✅	✅	✅	✅	✅
RASA	Contemporary	Toronto – Downtown	—	—	✅	✅	✅
Ricky+Olivia	Canadian	Toronto – Riverdale	—	—	—	✅	✅
RPM Bakehouse	Bakery	Lincoln	—	—	—	—	✅
SumiLicious Smoked Meat & Deli	Jewish	Toronto – Scarborough	✅	✅	✅	✅	✅
Sundays	Canadian	Uxbridge	—	—	—	✅	✅
Sunnys Chinese	Chinese	Toronto – Downtown	—	✅	✅	✅	✅
The Ace	Gastropub	Toronto – Parkdale	✅	✅	✅	✅	✅
The Cottage Cheese	Indian	Toronto – Downtown	—	—	—	✅	✅
The Lunch Lady of Saigon	Vietnamese	Toronto – West End	—	—	—	—	✅
Tiflisi	Georgian	Toronto – The Beaches	—	✅	✅	✅	✅
White Lily Diner	American	Toronto – Riverdale	—	✅	✅	✅	✅
Wynona	Italian	Toronto – Riverdale	✅	✅	✅	—	—
Reference							

== Vancouver ==
As of the 2026 Michelin Guide, there are 16 restaurants in Vancouver with a Bib Gourmand rating.

Key
✅	Indicates a restaurant with a Michelin Bib Gourmand designation
—	The restaurant did not receive a Bib Gourmand that year
Closed	The restaurant is no longer open

Name	Cuisine	Location	2022	2023	2024	2025	2026
Anh and Chi	Vietnamese	Vancouver – Riley Park	✅	✅	✅	✅	✅
Chef's Choice Seafood	Cantonese	Vancouver – Fairview	—	—	—	—	✅
Chupito	Mexican	Vancouver – Downtown	✅	✅	✅	—	—
Fable Kitchen	Contemporary	Vancouver – Kitsilano	✅	✅	✅	—	Closed
Farmer's Apprentice	Contemporary	Vancouver – Fairview	—	✅	✅	✅	✅
Fiorino	Italian	Vancouver – DTES	✅	✅	—	—	—
Gary's	French	Vancouver – Fairview	—	—	✅	✅	✅
Good Thief	Vietnamese	Vancouver – Riley Park	—	—	—	✅	✅
Karma Indian Bistro	Indian	Vancouver – Kitsilano	—	✅	✅	✅	✅
Kavita	Indian	Vancouver – Mount Pleasant	—	—	—	—	✅
Little Bird Dim Sum + Craft Beer	Chinese	Vancouver – Kitsilano	✅	✅	✅	✅	✅
Lunch Lady	Vietnamese	Vancouver – East	✅	✅	✅	✅	✅
Magari by Oca	Italian	Vancouver – East	✅	✅	✅	✅	✅
Motonobu Udon	Japanese	Vancouver – East	—	✅	✅	✅	✅
Nightshade	Contemporary	Vancouver – Downtown	✅	✅	Closed		
Phnom Penh	Cambodian	Vancouver – DTES	✅	✅	✅	✅	✅
Say Mercy!	Southern	Vancouver – Kensington	✅	✅	✅	Closed	
Seaport City Seafood	Chinese	Vancouver – Fairview	—	✅	✅	✅	✅
Song by Kin Kao	Thai	Vancouver – Mount Pleasant	✅	✅	✅	✅	✅
Sushi Hil	Japanese	Vancouver – Riley Park	—	✅	✅	✅	✅
Vij's	Indian	Vancouver – Mount Pleasant	✅	✅	✅	✅	✅
Reference							
