= RASA (restaurant) =

Contemporary restaurant in Toronto, Ontario, Canada

- Interactive map of RASA

Restaurant information
- Established: June 1, 2014
- Owner: Food Dudes Hospitality
- Head chef: Lia Silva
- Food type: Contemporary
- Rating: Bib Gourmand (Michelin Guide)
- Location: 196 Robert Street, Toronto, Ontario, Canada
- Coordinates: 43.6628°N 79.404°W
- Website: www.rasabar.ca

RASA is a contemporary restaurant in the Harbord Village neighbourhood of Toronto's Downtown.

== History ==
The restaurant was opened in the spring of 2014, a part of the Food Dudes Hospitality Group which owns and operates multiple restaurants across Toronto. The restaurant's name, Rasa, is derived from the Latin phrase tabula rasa, which translates to "blank slate."

Adrian Niman, was named the head chef at opening, and held the title of executive chef at the restaurant through much of its operation. As of 2026, Lia Silva is the executive chef.

To sustain operations during the COVID-19 pandemic while restrictions prevented or reduced the ability for patrons to dine on-site, the restaurant focused on a combination of takeout business and a street-side patio to attract customers.

RASA's sister restaurant, SARA, whose name is an anagram of the former, has also been recognized in the Michelin Guide, receiving a "Recommended" designation.

== Concept ==
The restaurant embraces a contemporary culinary approach, drawing inspiration from a variety of sources rather than adhering to the foods, traditions, or techniques of a specific region.

The restaurant's wine card has a strong focus on bottles that are produced in Ontario.

== Recognition ==
The business was named a Bib Gourmand restaurant by the Michelin Guide at Toronto's 2024 Michelin Guide ceremony, and retained this designation in 2025. A Bib Gourmand recognition is awarded to restaurants who offer "exceptionally good food at moderate prices." Michelin commended the restaurant's ability to cook good food while maintaining a relaxed ambiance. Dishes highlighted by Michelin include the sea bream ceviche with chili oil, lamb vindaloo dumplings, and the house burger made with beef cheek.

== See also ==
- List of Michelin Bib Gourmand restaurants in Canada
