= Steven Molnar =

- Born: Toronto
- Education: Institut Paul Bocuse
- Occupation: Executive chef

Steven Molnar is a Canadian chef. As the Executive Chef and partner at Quetzal in Toronto, he has been awarded a Michelin star each year since 2022.

== Education and early life ==
Originally from Toronto, Steven Molnar began working in restaurants at the age of 13. He was later trained in classical French cooking at the Institut Paul Bocuse.

== Career ==
Early in his career Molnar worked at a French restaurant in Whitby, Ontario. After his education, Molnar began his career working at restaurants including Nota Bene in Toronto; Brasserie le Nord in Lyon, France; and Restaurant Toqué! in Montreal. He then returned to Toronto to work at Bar Isabel and Bar Raval, before becoming the executive chef at Quetzal as the restaurant reopened in 2019. In 2023 Molnar earned a Michelin Star for his work as executive chef at Quetzal, a Mexican cuisine restaurant in Toronto. The citation noted dishes of his including griddled blue masa tortillas with lamb barbacoa and charred maitake mushrooms in crema poblano.

Molnar retained the star in 2023, 2024, and 2025. In 2025 Molnar received a Best Chef Award the One Knife (Excellent) award at their annual ceremony in Milan, Italy; and his restaurant was placed at number 11 on the San Pellegrino's list North America's 50 Best restaurants. Molnar is known for using wood-fired cooking, applying it to traditionally cooked Mexican food. According to Canadian television network Flavour, he is known to “source a lot of specialty ingredients from Mexico” and “recognizes the importance and value of working with local Canadian farmers.”
