= Chica's Chicken =

Restaurant in Toronto, Ontario, Canada

Coordinates: 43.6652°N 79.4643°W

- Interactive map of Chica's Chicken

Restaurant information
- Established: May 4, 2018
- Owners: Carolyn Pelechaty; Matt Pelechaty
- Head chef: Matt Pelechaty
- Food type: Southern; American
- Rating: Bib Gourmand (Michelin Guide)
- Location: 2853 Dundas Street West, Toronto, Ontario, Canada
- Reservations: No
- Other locations: Whitby, Ontario; Winnipeg, Manitoba
- Website: www.chicaschicken.net

Chica's Chicken is a restaurant in The Junction neighbourhood of Toronto, Ontario, Canada. It specializes in Nashville hot chicken.

== History ==
The restaurant opened in 2018, and is owned by husband-and-wife couple Carolyn and Matt Pelechaty. Matt Pelechaty also serves as the head chef for the restaurant. The business is named after the owners' late dog, Chica.

The restaurant opened in the location of a former diner, with much of the interior and aesthetic largely left untouched. While it primarily focuses on take-out, limited seating is available for dine-in customers.

Matt Pelechaty previously worked at Toronto barbecue staple Adamson Barbecue, and did not have familiarity in cooking hot chicken. He credited a trip to Nashville, where he tried fried chicken staple Prince's Hot Chicken Shack for the first time, as the inspiration behind his decision to cook hot chicken and eventually open the restaurant.

=== Expansion ===
Chica's opened a second location in Toronto's Annex neighbourhood in fall 2022, but the location ceased operations in late 2023. In fall 2024, the business renewed its expansion efforts, launching new locations Steinbach, Manitoba (closed as of July 2025) and Whitby, Ontario.

== Food ==
Chica's offers a limited menu, serving Nashville hot chicken at three spice levels - mild, medium and “hot AF”, as well as three options for sides.

The chicken is brined for two days and seasoned with a mix of spices. The chicken is fried and served to-order.

== Recognition ==
The business's original location in The Junction was named a Bib Gourmand restaurant by the Michelin Guide at Toronto's 2022 Michelin Guide ceremony, and has retained this recognition each year following. A Bib Gourmand recognition is awarded to restaurants who offer "exceptionally good food at moderate prices."

== See also ==
- List of Michelin Bib Gourmand restaurants in Canada
