= Dead Set on Life =

Canadian culinary travel television series

Dead Set on Life is a Canadian culinary travel television series, which premiered in 2016 on Viceland. Hosted by Toronto, Ontario chef Matty Matheson, the series features Matheson travelling to various communities throughout Canada and the world to sample local food.

The series received two Canadian Screen Award nominations at the 6th Canadian Screen Awards in 2018, for Best Lifestyle Program or Series and Best Host in a Lifestyle Program or Series.

The series gets its name from the Cancer Bats album Dead Set On Living.
