= Le Petit Alep =

Syrian restaurant in Montreal, Canada

Restaurant information
- Established: 1995
- Owners: Chahla Frangié; Tania Frangié; Jean-François Potvin
- Head chef: Chahla Frangié; Tania Frangié
- Food type: Syrian; Armenian
- Rating: Bib Gourmand (Michelin Guide)
- Location: 191 rue Jean-Talon Est, Montreal, Quebec, Canada
- Seating capacity: 60
- Website: www.restaurantalep.com

Le Petit Alep is a Syrian-Armenian restaurant in the Villeray–Saint-Michel–Parc-Extension borough of Montreal, Canada.

== History ==
Le Petit Alep was established in 1995 by sisters Chahla and Tania Frangié, along with Chahla’s husband, Jean-François Potvin. The Frangié family has a mixed Syrian and Armenian heritage, and the founders sought to reflect both cultural influences in the restaurant’s cuisine.

Before the launch of Le Petit Alep, the location was home to a small five-table establishment called Restaurant Alep, operated by the Frangiés' father, Georges Frangié. The siblings took over the family business, expanded its concept, and reopened it under its current name.

Tania and Chahla continue to run the kitchen of the restaurant, occasionally with the assistance of their mother, Jacqueline.

== Recognition ==
In 2025, the business received a 'Bib Gourmand' designation in Quebec's inaugural Michelin Guide. Per the guide, a Bib Gourmand recognition is awarded to restaurants who offer "exceptionally good food at moderate prices." Michelin praised the restaurant for honoring the Frangié family's Middle Eastern heritage through its menu, singling out its vibrant mezze, spiced kebabs with traditional fléflé, emblematic mehalabié dessert, and an extensive wine list.

Condé Nast magazine listed Le Petit Alep among its '25 Best Restaurants in Montreal', highlighting stuffed grape leaves, mouhamara, and kebbe naye as dish highlights.

The restaurant has earned praise and notability for its wine list, with Montreal Gazette restaurant critic Lesley Chesterman highlighting it as preferable to many fine dining restaurants in France.

== See also ==
- List of Michelin Bib Gourmand Restaurants in Canada
