= L'Express (restaurant) =

French bistro in Montreal, Quebec, Canada

- Interactive map of L'Express

Restaurant information
- Established: December 18, 1980
- Owners: Colette Brossoit; Josée Préfontaine; François Tremblay; Pierre Villeneuve
- Head chef: Marc-Antoine Lacasse
- Food type: French
- Rating: Bib Gourmand (Michelin Guide)
- Location: 3927 Rue Saint-Denis, Montreal, Quebec, Canada
- Coordinates: 45°31′13″N 73°34′28″W
- Seating capacity: 81
- Website: restaurantlexpress.com/en/

L'Express is a Parisian-style French bistro in the Le Plateau-Mont-Royal borough of Montreal, Quebec, Canada.

== History ==
L'Express was opened in December 1980 by Colette Brossoit and Pierre Villeneuve. Prior to founding the restaurant, both were active in Montreal’s arts community and sought to create an affordable venue with friendly service and a kitchen that would stay open until 3 a.m. daily. Villeneuve has stated that he intended for L'Express to feel like a long-established institution, modeled after a 1950s French bistro. Despite neither having restaurant experience prior to opening L'Express, Brossoit served as the chef while Villeneuve managed the front of house in the first years of business.

French-born Joël Chapoulie served as head chef from 1982 to 2012 and is credited with elevating the restaurant’s cuisine, helping establish L'Express as a must-visit destination in Montreal’s dining scene. As of April 2025, Marc-Antoine Lacasse serves as the restaurant's head chef, succeeding Jean-François Vachon. Lacasse has emphasized the importance of preserving the restaurant’s classic dishes and maintaining the successful recipes developed by Chapoulie and Vachon.

As of 2026, the restaurant is open daily from morning until 1 a.m., and serves breakfast, lunch, dinner as well as late-night meals. It is also known for its large selection of affordably-priced wines, having over 11,000 bottles in its cellar.

== Recognition ==
In 2025, the business received a 'Bib Gourmand' designation in Quebec's inaugural Michelin Guide. Per the guide, a Bib Gourmand recognition is awarded to restaurants who offer "exceptionally good food at moderate prices."

Montreal Gazette restaurant critic Lesley Chesterman awarded the restaurant 4 out of 4 stars in her July 2020 review, stating that Montreal would be "unimaginable" without the business. She praised the restaurant’s unwavering consistency, its classic French bistro fare, and its exceptional wine list; while highlighting the charm and professionalism of the long-standing staff.

The New York Times praised the restaurant as "a French bistro in the classic mold", citing L'Express, alongside fellow Montreal restaurants Au Pied de Cochon and Joe Beef as "igniting a restaurant renaissance in [the city] that creatively blends Québécois and French tradition in small, fashionable, unpretentious neighborhood restaurants."

American online food and drink publication Eater has called the restaurant a "venerable Montreal Institution", while stating that it manages to stay away from "hokey French bistro archetypes".

=== Canada's 100 Best Restaurants Ranking ===
The restaurant has appeared on Canada's 100 Best Restaurants ranking annually since debuting on the list in 2017. L'Express peaked at #21 in the ranking in the 2022 edition, and is presently placed #73 as of the 2026 publication.

L'Express
Year	Rank	Change
2015	71	new
2016	▼ No Rank	
2017	37	▲ re-entry
2018	37	Steady
2019	32	▲5
2020	30	▲2
2021	No List	
2022	21	▲9
2023	56	▼35
2024	53	▲3
2025	61	▼8
2026	73	▼12

== See also ==
- List of Michelin Bib Gourmand Restaurants in Canada
