= Cadet (restaurant) =

Restaurant in Montreal, Canada

- Interactive map of Cadet

Restaurant information
- Established: May 1, 2016
- Owners: Mélanie Blanchette; François Nadon
- Head chef: Antonio Ferreira
- Food type: Modern
- Rating: Bib Gourmand (Michelin Guide)
- Location: 1431 Blvd Saint-Laurent, Montreal, Quebec, Canada
- Coordinates: 45.5103°N 73.5644°W
- Seating capacity: 90
- Website: www.restaurantcadet.com

Cadet is a restaurant in the Ville-Marie borough of Montreal, Canada.

== History ==
The business was opened in May 2016 by Mélanie Blanchette and François Nadon, as the more casual sister concept to their fine dining restaurant Bouillon Bilk that is located one block away.

Similar to the design of Bouillon Bilk, no signage for the restaurant is posted out front for patrons, instead keeping the old decoration and frontage of its predecessor - an army surplus store.

Antonio Ferreira, formerly a member of the kitchen team at Bouillon Bilk, has served as the head chef at Cadet since beginning operation.

== Recognition ==
In 2025, the business received a 'Bib Gourmand' designation in Quebec's inaugural Michelin Guide. Per the guide, a Bib Gourmand recognition is awarded to restaurants who offer "exceptionally good food at moderate prices." Michelin called the experience "convivial", mentioning the tapas-style share plates as the highlight.

Reviewing the restaurant in August 2016, Montreal Gazette restaurant critic Lesley Chesterman awarded Cadet 2 1/2 out of 4 stars, praising the restaurant’s refined small plates, intricate presentations, and standout dishes like broccoli with labneh and spätzle, while noting a few inconsistencies in execution and balance.

Cadet is listed among Time Out Magazine's '50 Best Restaurants in Montreal', stating it as the place to go to "indulge in high-end cuisine in a casual setting."

== See also ==
- List of Michelin Bib Gourmand Restaurants in Canada
