= Sunnys Chinese =

Chinese restaurant in Toronto, Ontario, Canada

- Interactive map of Sunnys Chinese

Restaurant information
- Established: November 2020 (pop-up); August 2022 (restaurant)
- Owner: David Schwartz
- Head chef: David Schwartz; Braden Chong
- Food type: Chinese
- Rating: Bib Gourmand (Michelin Guide)
- Location: 60 Kensington Avenue, Toronto, Ontario, Canada
- Coordinates: 43°39′15.5″N 79°24′3.1″W
- Seating capacity: 75
- Reservations: Yes
- Website: www.sunnyschinese.com

Sunnys Chinese is a Chinese restaurant in Toronto, Ontario, Canada.

== History ==
Sunnys opened as a takeout pop-up in November 2020, selling food from the back door of its sister restaurant Mimi Chinese, which is located in Toronto's Yorkville neighbourhood. Mimi Chinese was closed at the time due to Ontario's COVID-19 restrictions which prohibited indoor dining at restaurants.

It moved to a permanent brick-and-mortar location located in Toronto's Kensington Market in August 2022. The restaurant is named after the manager of a nearby Toronto Chinatown restaurant, House of Gourmet.

Schwartz met Braden Chong, the restaurant's co-chef, while they were both working at DaiLo, a high-end Asian Fusion restaurant in Toronto.

== Concept ==
The restaurant's cuisine takes inspiration from street food offerings in multiple regions of China, such as Sichuan and Guangdong, as well as American Chinese cuisine. Notable dishes include stir-fried silver needle noodles and orange chicken, the latter paying homage to the popular dish from American Chinese restaurant chain Panda Express. The restaurant also has a heavy focus on dishes prepared via Chinese charcoal barbecue.

The restaurant's executive chef, David Schwartz, while not of Chinese origin, cites taking inspiration for his food from eating at Chinese restaurants located in Toronto's suburbs, including Markham and Scarborough. Both regions of Metro Toronto are known for their large Chinese-Canadian populations and restaurants. After being refused training at traditional Chinese restaurants, Schwartz turned to YouTube to learn Chinese cooking techniques.

Sunnys offers a cocktail menu that takes inspiration from ingredients and locations in China, such as bitter melon and prickly pear cactus. The restaurant also serves Chinese alcoholic beverages such as baijiu and Shaoxing wine.

== Reception ==
The business was named a Bib Gourmand restaurant by the Michelin Guide at Toronto's 2023 Michelin Guide ceremony, and has retained this recognition each year following. A Bib Gourmand recognition is awarded to restaurants who offer "exceptionally good food at moderate prices". The restaurant's executive chef, David Schwartz, was also awarded the inaugural Michelin Young Chef award at the 2023 Toronto award ceremony.

The restaurant was included in Air Canada's annual list of best new restaurants in Canada in 2021, winning the 'Best Takeout' award.

Sunnys Chinese is the more casual concept sibling restaurant to Mimi Chinese, which is also recognized in Toronto's Michelin Guide.

=== Canada's 100 Best Restaurants Ranking ===
Sunnys debuted at #38 on Canada's 100 Best Restaurants list in 2024. The restaurant did not rank the next year.

Sunnys Chinese
Year	Rank	Change
2024	38	new
2025	▼ No Rank	
2026	94	▲ re-entry

== See also ==
- List of Chinese restaurants
- List of Michelin Bib Gourmand restaurants in Canada
