= Parapluie (restaurant) =

Restaurant in Montreal, Canada

- Interactive map of Parapluie

Restaurant information
- Established: February 20, 2024
- Owners: Robin Filteau Boucher; Karelle Voyer
- Head chef: Robin Filteau Boucher
- Food type: French
- Rating: Bib Gourmand (Michelin Guide)
- Location: 44 rue Beaubien Ouest, Montreal, Quebec, Canada
- Coordinates: 45.5301°N 73.6097°W
- Seating capacity: 32
- Website: leparapluie.ca

Parapluie is a French restaurant in the La Petite-Patrie neighbourhood of Montreal, Canada.

== History ==
The business was opened in February 2024 by chef-owner Robin Filteau Boucher and sommelier Karelle Voyer. The restaurant's name, the French word for umbrella, was chosen by Filteau Boucher based on his favourite song by Canadian singer-songwriter Daniel Bélanger.

The restaurant primarily focuses on sharing plates and has a small menu, while the wine list often has a focus on offerings from small and lesser known estates. It also offers guests the option of a three course set menu.

== Recognition ==
In 2025, the business received a 'Bib Gourmand' designation in Quebec's inaugural Michelin Guide. Per the guide, a Bib Gourmand recognition is awarded to restaurants who offer "exceptionally good food at moderate prices." Michelin highlighted the restaurant's French-inspired sharing plates, specifically singling out the egg mayonnaise with lobster.

In addition to the Michelin Guide, other media have also commended the egg mayonnaise with lobster as the standout dish, including Elle Magazine and Le Devoir.

Parapluie was ranked #6 in Air Canada's annual list of 10 best new restaurants in the country for 2024.

Writing for Montreal-based newspaper La Presse, Iris Gagnon-Paradis praised the restaurant's "short and very pretty" menu, highlighting egg mayonnaise with lobster and house-made fresh pasta, as well as the attentive service. She noted the restaurant’s emphasis on creativity, spontaneity, and well-executed, seasonal fare.

=== Canada's 100 Best Restaurants Ranking ===
Parapluie debuted on Canada's 100 Best Restaurants in 2025, ranking at #35.

Parapluie
Year	Rank	Change
2025	35	new
2026	56	▼21

== See also ==
- List of Michelin Bib Gourmand restaurants in Canada
