= Favorites Thai =

Thai restaurant in Toronto, Ontario, Canada

- Interactive map of Favorites Thai

Restaurant information
- Established: August 1, 2019
- Owners: Jonathan Poon; Monte Wan
- Head chef: Ronnie Sue
- Food type: Thai
- Rating: Bib Gourmand (Michelin Guide)
- Location: 141 Ossington Avenue, Toronto, Ontario, Canada
- Coordinates: 43°38′51″N 79°25′11″W
- Seating capacity: 40
- Website: www.myfavethai.com

Favorites Thai is a Thai restaurant in the Trinity-Bellwoods neighbourhood of Toronto's West End.

== History ==
The restaurant was opened in 2019 by Jonathan Poon and Monte Wan, who also own Toronto restaurants Khao San Road and Paris Paris. They cited wanting to open a Thai restaurant which could introduce their Toronto customer base to "dishes that they didn't necessarily know about." Access to the restaurant can only be found through entering via a coffee shop.

The business employs the American spelling of "Favorites" in its name. According to the owners, this choice was made for aesthetic reasons, as the restaurant's logo was more visually appealing without the inclusion of the letter "u."

Favorites has an open kitchen, using binchotan charcoal to grill its dishes. It also uses local ingredients to create its Thai-inspired salads and grilled dishes.

== Recognition ==
The business was named a Bib Gourmand restaurant by the Michelin Guide at Toronto's 2022 Michelin Guide ceremony, and has retained this recognition each year following. A Bib Gourmand recognition is awarded to restaurants that offer "exceptionally good food at moderate prices." Michelin cited the restaurant's use of "fresh herbs and fiery chilis" in its dishes, including highlighting its appetizers and curries. The restaurant's owners cited the Bib Gourmand award, helping to increase business to their location and wanting to continue pushing the restaurant's cuisine to receive a Michelin star eventually.

== See also ==
- List of Michelin Bib Gourmand restaurants in Canada
