= The Ace (restaurant) =

Gastropub in Toronto, Ontario, Canada

- Interactive map of The Ace

Restaurant information
- Established: December 1, 2011
- Owners: Rafael Badell; Maggie Stackpole
- Head chef: Rafael Badell
- Food type: Gastropub
- Rating: Bib Gourmand (Michelin Guide)
- Location: 231A Roncesvalles Avenue, Toronto, Ontario, Canada
- Coordinates: 43.6461°N 79.4488°W
- Website: www.theacetoronto.com

The Ace is a restaurant and gastropub in Parkdale, Toronto, Canada.

== History ==
The restaurant was opened in fall 2011 by local couple Greg Boggs and Maggie Ruhl, occupying the former location of the Ace Chinese Restaurant and retaining the name, with "Chinese" dropped from the title. The couple kept the predecessor restaurant's 1950s diner aesthetic, and updated the menu to serve 'homestyle comfort food and French classics.'

At opening, the restaurant's kitchen was headed by Chef Peter McKnight, serving items like steak frites and fried chicken with collard greens.

The restaurant closed and was put up for sale in the summer of 2020 amidst the COVID-19 pandemic. In December 2020, the restaurant was sold to present owners, husband-and-wife couple Rafael Badell and Maggie Stackpole. The couple re-opened the restaurant in January 2021, with Baddell taking over as the business's executive chef. Baddell's culinary background is as a baker, using his prior experience to make much of the restaurant's bread in house.

== Recognition ==
The business was named a Bib Gourmand restaurant by the Michelin Guide at Toronto's 2022 Michelin Guide ceremony, and has retained this recognition each year following. A Bib Gourmand recognition is awarded to restaurants who offer "exceptionally good food at moderate prices." Michelin cited the restaurant's brunch offerings as the highlight, including the duck confit and wild mushroom toast served on sourdough. Additionally, Michelin praised the restaurant's French toast, served with caramelized pears, vanilla bean whipped ricotta and toasted pistachios, calling it "likely the city’s best." The owners attributed the Bib Gourmand recognition increasing business to the restaurant, helping it recover and stay in operation following the pandemic.

In 2013, the restaurant was featured on Guy Fieri's television show Diners, Drive-Ins, and Dives, with Fieri commending the business's mac-and-cheese burger and deep-fried pork belly.

== See also ==
- List of Michelin Bib Gourmand restaurants in Canada
