= Jen Agg =

Canadian restaurateur and author (born 1975)

- Born: September 4, 1975 (age 51); Scarborough, Ontario, Canada
- Spouse: Roland Jean
- Culinary career
- Current restaurants
- General Public, Toronto (2025–present); Bar Vendetta, Toronto (2019–present); Le Swan, Toronto (2018–present); Grey Gardens, Toronto (2017–present); Rhum Corners, Toronto (2013–present); Cocktail Bar, Toronto (2011–present)
- Previous restaurants
- The Black Hoof, Toronto (2008–2018); Agrikol, Montreal (2015–2020); Hoof Raw Bar, Toronto (2012–2013); Cobalt, Toronto (1998–2006)

Jen Agg (born 1975) is an owner and operator of several Canadian restaurants and an author of two published memoirs.

Agg's first establishment was the Toronto cocktail venue Cobalt, which she launched in 1998 with her then-husband, Tyler Taverner. In 2008, Agg founded the Toronto restaurant the Black Hoof with business partner Grant van Gameren. It became well known for its charcuterie and cocktails and was featured on the Toronto episode (s2e15) of Anthony Bourdain's TV series broadcast on the Travel Channel's The Layover. Agg bought out Gameren's share in the restaurant in 2011 and opened Cocktail Bar in the same year. In 2012 Agg opened the seafood restaurant Hoof Raw Bar, which closed in 2013. In its place Agg opened a Haitian-themed bar named Rhum Corner, which was inspired in part by her husband's Haitian cultural heritage. The Black Hoof closed in 2018 after ten years.

In 2015, Agg and her husband Roland Jean partnered with Arcade Fire’s Régine Chassagne and Win Butler to create and operate a Haitian-themed restaurant in Montreal called Agrikol. Agg and Jean ended this partnership in 2018 and sold their share to the co-owners. Two years later, Agrikol closed.

In June 2015, Kate Burnham, a former pastry chef employed by Toronto restaurant Weslodge Saloon, filed a complaint to the Ontario Human Rights Tribunal, alleging sexual harassment in the kitchen. In response, Agg organized a one-time conference called Kitchen Bitches: Smashing the Patriarchy One Plate at a Time.

Since 2015, Jen Agg has opened and operated four additional restaurants in Toronto: Grey Gardens (2017–present), Le Swan (2018–present), Bar Vendetta (2019–present) and General Public (2025–present).

In 2022, two of Jen Agg's restaurants received recognition out of the 74 Canadian restaurants with awards from Michelin's first Canadian edition. Grey Gardens won a Bib Gourmand award and Bar Vendetta made its list of Selected restaurants.

Beginning in 2026, Agg co-hosts Restaurant Impossible: Last Call with Aarón Sánchez, produced by Food Network (Canada)

== Books ==
In 2017, her memoir I Hear She's a Real Bitch was first published by Doubleday Canada and was a finalist for the Toronto Book Awards.

In 2026, her second memoir will be published by Penguin Random House Canada. It is entitled Table Boss: How to Build a Restaurant When Your Life Falls Apart (A Love Story).
