= Matty Matheson =

Canadian chef, restaurateur, producer, vocalist and internet personality (born 1982)

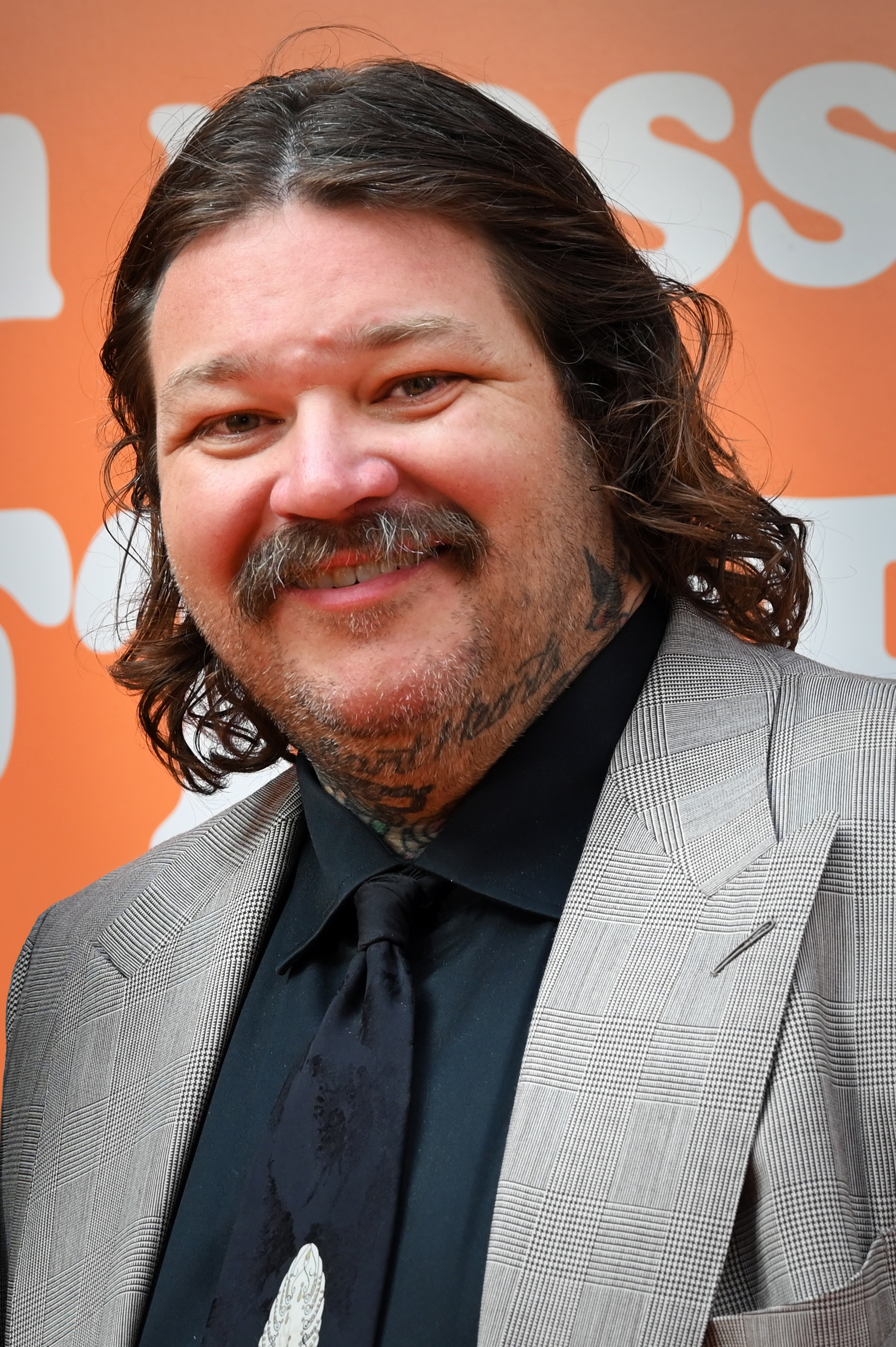
- Matheson in 2026
- Born: February 7, 1982 (age 44); Saint John, New Brunswick, Canada
- Spouse: Trish Spencer
- Children: 3
- Culinary career
- Current restaurants
- Matty's Patty's Burger Club, Toronto, Ontario (2020–present); Matty's Patty's Burger Club, Costa Mesa, California (2024–present); Prime Seafood Palace, Toronto, Ontario (2022–present); Rizzo's House of Parm, Fort Erie, Ontario (2022–present); The Iron Cow, Hamilton, Ontario (2025-present)
- Previous restaurants
- Le Sélect Bistro, Toronto, Ontario (2003–2006); La Palette, Toronto, Ontario (2006–2008); Parts & Labour, Toronto, Ontario (2010–2019); Matty Matheson's Meat + Three, Fort Erie, Ontario (2020–2022); Birria Balam, Toronto, Ontario (2021–2021); Fonda Balam, Toronto, Ontario (2021–2024); Bar Clams, Toronto, Ontario (2024–2025); Ca Phe Rang, Toronto, Ontario (2021–2026)
- Television shows
- Dead Set on Life (2016–2017); It's Suppertime! (2017–2018); Workin' Moms (2018); The Bear (2022–)
- Website: mattymatheson.store

Matthew James Matheson (born February 7, 1982) is a Canadian chef and actor. From 2022 to 2026, he played Neil Fak on the FX on Hulu series The Bear, which he also executive produced.

Matheson was the executive chef of Parts & Labour, a restaurant in Toronto, Ontario, which permanently closed on January 1, 2019. Matheson has since started Matty's Patty's Burger Club, a takeout restaurant in Toronto, which opened in December 2020. In April 2022, Matheson opened Prime Seafood Palace, which is also in Toronto. Matheson regularly appeared on Vice's show Munchies. He previously hosted Viceland's It's Suppertime! and Dead Set on Life.

== Early life ==
Matheson was born in Saint John, New Brunswick; his parents are engineer Stephen and waitress Joan Matheson. The family lived in Nova Scotia until Matheson turned 11, when they moved to Fort Erie, Ontario. Before moving to Ontario, Matheson had grown up as a member of the Church of Jesus Christ of Latter-day Saints; however, the family left the church when leaving Nova Scotia. Matheson's grandfather was a restaurateur and former RCMP officer from Prince Edward Island (PEI), the family having roots in PEI dating back to the 1700s. His grandfather owned and operated The Blue Goose restaurant in DeSable, where Matty would spend his summers.

Matheson moved to Toronto in 2000 and attended Humber College's cooking program. To serve a short stint as a roadie for his friends' metal band, he dropped out of the program before graduating. However, Matheson found he had a talent for butchering meat, and he continued his culinary career by handing out resumes to random restaurants until he found employment.

== Career ==
=== Early culinary career ===
Matheson began working at Le Sélect Bistro in Toronto in 2003 under chef Rang Nguyen, who taught him French culinary techniques. In 2006, Matheson was hired at the restaurant La Palette. In 2010, Matheson became executive chef at the new Parts & Labour restaurant until it closed in 2019. His recognition, along with his outgoing and wild personality, would lead to his appearance on the online show Munchies by Vice Media.

=== On-screen ===
He was hired to host Viceland's It's Suppertime and Dead Set on Life. Matheson also maintains his own Youtube channel.

Matheson has also appeared on Jimmy Kimmel Live!, where he showed Jimmy Kimmel how to make a "stuffed shell family recipe".

In June 2022, Matheson joined the cast and crew of FX's The Bear. He portrays handyman Neil Fak, and he also serves as a producer and culinary consultant on the show.

=== Restaurants ===
Matheson partnered with Shlomo Buchler in 2015 to create a pizza restaurant called Maker Pizza, which has opened and expanded into numerous locations within the Greater Toronto Area.

During the COVID-19 pandemic, in the summer of 2020, Matheson created a pop-up restaurant called Matty Matheson's Meat + Three, a take on the American South's meat and three, specializing in American barbecue, in Fort Erie; the Meat + Three pop-up closed in 2022.

In October 2020, Matheson opened another pop-up restaurant in Toronto, a continuation of Matty's Patty's, which was originally located in Hawaii with a short stint in Shibuya, Japan. Matty's Patty's opened a permanent location in the Trinity-Bellwoods neighbourhood in Toronto in December 2020.

In April 2021, Matheson partnered with Toronto chefs Kate Chomyshyn and Julio Guajardo to open a new pop-up restaurant in Toronto called Birria Balam, specializing in the Mexican dish birria. Matheson, Chomyshyn, and Guadjardo opened up a new permanent restaurant, Fonda Balam, in the Trinity-Bellwoods and Little Italy neighbourhoods of Toronto in October 2021, serving birria and other Mexican cuisine. They subsequently closed Birria Balam.

In January 2022, Matheson teamed up with his mentor and friend Rang Nguyen and opened Ca Phe Rang, a Vietnamese restaurant serving pho and bánh mì. The restaurant opened where Birria Balam had been previously, in Chinatown, Toronto.

In April 2022, Matheson opened Prime Seafood Palace, a steakhouse and seafood restaurant in Trinity-Bellwoods, Toronto. Matheson had been working on opening the restaurant since 2016.

In November 2022, Matheson opened Rizzo's House of Parm, a restaurant serving old-school Italian-American cuisine, at Crystal Beach in Fort Erie, Ontario. The restaurant took its inspiration from the Italian family of his wife Trish, and he named the restaurant after his first daughter and second child, Rizzo.

In Hamilton, Ontario, Matheson's latest restaurant, Iron Cow Public House, opened in December 2025.

Matheson has incorporated all of his restaurants into his company, Our House Hospitality Company.

=== Cookbooks ===
In October 2018, Matheson released his first cookbook, Matty Matheson: A Cookbook.

On September 29, 2020, Matheson released his second cookbook, Matty Matheson: Home Style Cookery. He recorded a series of YouTube videos to coincide with the release of this book.

His third book, Matty Matheson: Soups, Salads, Sandwiches, was released in October 2024.

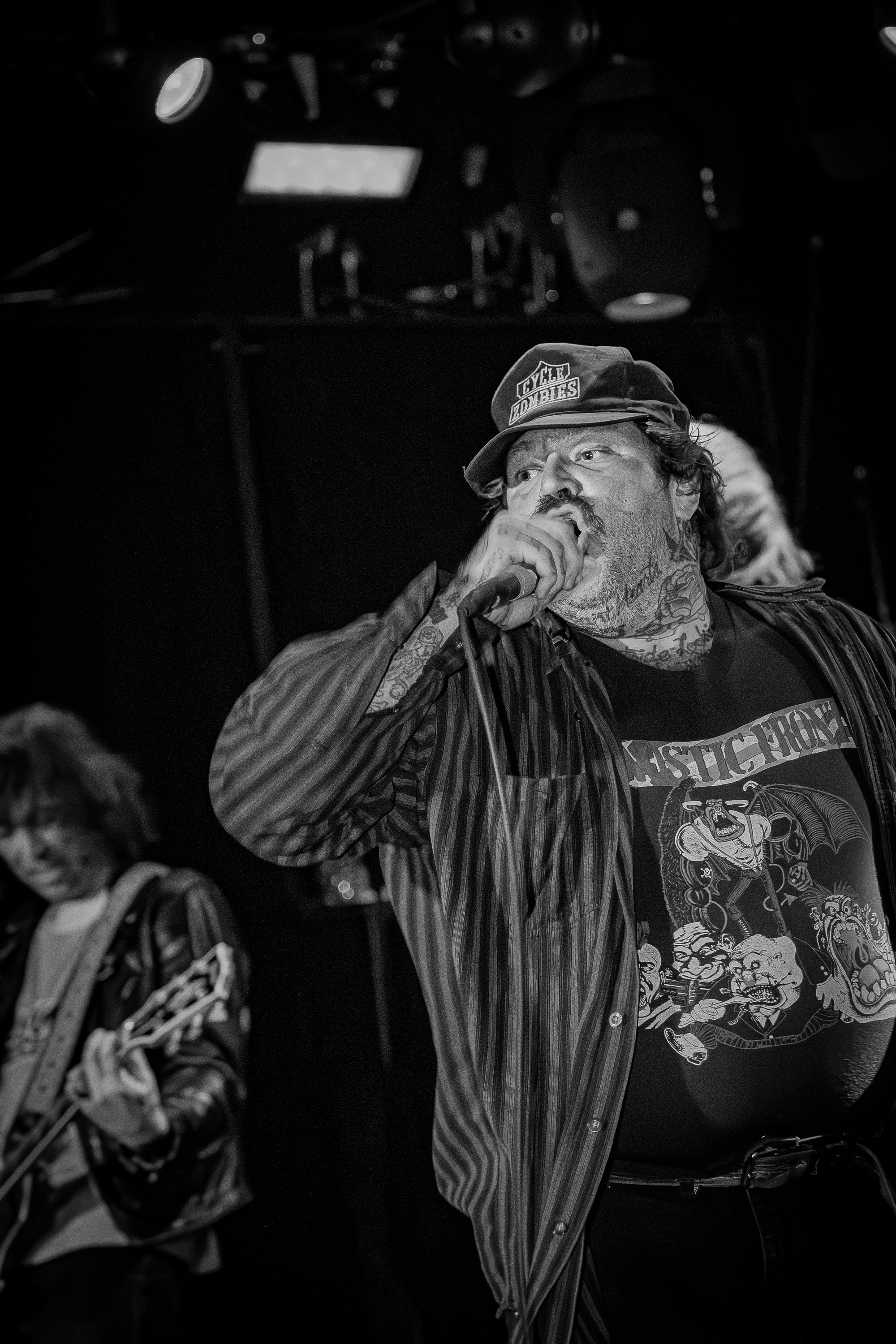
Matty Matheson performing with his hardcore punk band Pig Pen at TV Eye in Brooklyn on July 5th 2025

=== Miscellaneous ===
In March 2020, Matheson and artist Alex 2Tone, co-founder of streetwear brand Born X Raised, started a podcast titled Powerful Truth Angels, with producer Jason Nelken.

In 2020, Matheson teamed up with Toronto chef Keenan McVey and opened Blue Goose Farm, a small farm in Fort Erie, Ontario; the farm, named after a restaurant owned by Matheson's grandfather, helps to supply vegetables to some of his restaurants and other restaurants in Toronto.

In 2022, Matheson started the "hyper-local entrepreneur" workwear clothing line, Rosa Rugosa, with production based in the West Toronto neighbourhood of Parkdale. Matheson has also started a kitchen utensil collection.

In 2025 Matheson announced the formation of Pig Pen, a hardcore punk band also featuring Wade MacNeil and Daniel Romano. The band had their debut performance at Sneaky Dee's on April 25, 2025.

== Personal life ==
Matheson has a history of substance abuse. He first tried cocaine in grade 11. His regular use of the drug would lead him to a heart attack at the age of 29. Matheson quit using drugs and alcohol at the end of 2013. Seven months after becoming sober, Matheson shot his first episode of Keep It Canada. In his personal time, Matheson enjoys riding motorcycles, including custom choppers.

== Filmography ==
=== Film ===
Key
†	Denotes films that have not yet been released

Year	Title	Role	Notes
2025	Gabby's Dollhouse: The Movie	Cookie Bobby	Voice
2026	Toy Story 5	Dr. Nutcase	Voice
2026	Slayground †		Post-production

=== Television ===
Year	Title	Role	Notes
2011	Kenny Hotz's Triumph of the Will	Himself	Season 1, episode 6
2016	Last Call with Carson Daly	Himself	Season 15, episode 44
2016–2017	VICE: Essentials	Narrator	Episode: "Forever Young"
2016–2017	Dead Set on Life	Himself	Host; 24 episodes; also producer
2017–2018	It's Suppertime!	Himself	Host; 24 episodes; also writer and producer
2018	Workin' Moms	Mams	2 episodes
2018–2019	The Burger Show	Himself	2 episodes (First We Feast)
2021	Craig of the Creek	Keef	Voice; episode: "The New Jersey"
2022–2026	The Bear	Neil Fak	42 episodes; also co-producer (season 1), executive producer (season 2-5)
2022	Trailer Park Boys: The SwearNet Show	Chef Cameo	Season 1, episode 5
2022	Selena + Chef	Himself	Episode: "Selena + Matty Matheson"
2024	Barbecue Showdown	Himself	Judge (season 3, episode 5)
2025	Big City Greens	Sauce Boss	Voice; episode: "Freebie Frenzy"

==== Web series ====
Year	Title	Role	Notes
2014–2015	Keep It Canada with Matty Matheson	Himself	Host; 6 episodes
2016	Hot Ones	Himself	Episode: "Matty Matheson Turns Into a Motivational Speaker"
2019–present	Just a Dash	Himself	Host
2020	Matty and Benny Eat Out America	Himself	Host
2021	Stupid Fucking Cooking Show	Himself	Host
2021	Cookin' Something with Matty Matheson	Himself	Host

== Awards and nominations ==
Year	Association	Category	Project	Result	Ref.
2024	The Astra Awards	Best Supporting Actor in a Streaming Comedy Series	The Bear	Nominated	
2024	Primetime Emmy Awards	Outstanding Comedy Series	The Bear	Nominated	
2025	Primetime Emmy Awards	Outstanding Comedy Series	The Bear	Nominated	
2026	Primetime Emmy Awards	Outstanding Comedy Series	The Bear	Pending	
2023	Screen Actors Guild Awards / Actor Awards	Outstanding Performance by an Ensemble in a Comedy Series	The Bear	Nominated	
2024	Screen Actors Guild Awards / Actor Awards	Outstanding Performance by an Ensemble in a Comedy Series	The Bear	Won	
2025	Screen Actors Guild Awards / Actor Awards	Outstanding Performance by an Ensemble in a Comedy Series	The Bear	Nominated	
2026	Screen Actors Guild Awards / Actor Awards	Outstanding Performance by an Ensemble in a Comedy Series	The Bear	Nominated	

== Bibliography ==
=== Non-fiction ===
- Matty Matheson: A Cookbook. New York: Harry N. Abrams. 2018. ISBN 978-1-4197-3245-4.
- Matty Matheson: Home Style Cookery. New York: Harry N. Abrams. 2020. ISBN 978-1-4197-4748-9.
- Matty Matheson: Soups, Salads, Sandwiches. New York: Ten Speed Press. 2024. ISBN 978-1-9848-6215-0.
