= White Lily Diner =

Restaurant in Toronto, Ontario, Canada

- Interactive map of White Lily Diner

Restaurant information
- Established: November 1, 2016
- Owner: Gajan Panchadcharam
- Food type: American; Creative
- Rating: (Michelin Guide); Bib Gourmand (Michelin Guide)
- Location: 678 Queen Street East, Toronto, Ontario, Canada
- Coordinates: 43°39′31.3″N 79°21′4.2″W
- Seating capacity: 30
- Reservations: Walk-In
- Website: https://white-lily-diner.myshopify.com/

White Lily Diner is a restaurant in the Riverdale neighbourhood of Toronto, Ontario, Canada.

The restaurant is known for their all-day diner offerings, as well as rotating daily flavour varieties of doughnuts.

== History ==
The founders cited the diner concept of U.S. restaurant chain Waffle House as an inspiration for White Lily Diner's own model and some menu items, such as the patty melt.

The restaurant also serves a variety of doughnuts, rotating between 2 and 3 flavour varieties every day. The doughnut flavours were first conceptualized by the restaurant's original pastry chef, Rachelle Cornish, and have continued to be made under successor chefs.

In fall 2024 the then-owners, Ben Denham and Ashley Lloyd, sold the restaurant to an Gajan Panchadcharam, who pledged not to alter the restaurant's successful concept. The restaurant retained its Michelin Green Star and Bib Gourmand in the next Guide update following the sale.

== Recognition ==
The business was named a Bib Gourmand restaurant by the Michelin Guide in 2023.

It was also awarded a Michelin Green star at the 2023 Michelin ceremony, with the recognition coming due to many of the ingredients in the restaurant's dishes being grown at the founders' organic farm, White Lily Farms. The farm, located in the Toronto suburb of Uxbridge, also provides ingredients it produces to several restaurants in the Toronto-area, in addition to the diner. The restaurant retained its Green star in the 2024 and 2025 guide.

== See also ==
- List of Michelin Bib Gourmand restaurants in Canada
