= Sikil pak =

Sikil pak

Sikil pak, also written sikil p’aak or p'aak i tsikil is a dip originating in Ancient Maya cuisine, made from toasted pumpkin seeds crushed with tomatoes into a rich paste.

== Overview ==
The dish's full name is ha'-sikil-p'aak. In Mayan language, ha is the word for water, sikil is the word for pumpkin seed, and p'aak is the word for tomato. Sikil pak is a ceremonial food associated with Hanal Pixán (Mayan Day of the Dead) celebrations, where it symbolises abundance, due to the role of both squash and tomatoes in the Milpa agricultural system.

In present-day Mexico, sikil pak is a dish associated with traditional Yucatec foodways, and features as part of culinary tourism in the Yucatán peninsula. It is served as a popular botana (appetiser) in local canteens and restaurants, and is eaten throughout Mexico more broadly.

The seeds used to prepare sikil pak come from a small-seeded pumpkin called k'uum (a variety of Cucurbita moschata). This is in contrast to some other Yucatecan pumpkin-seed dishes, such as papadzules and pipián, which are prepared with seeds from large-seeded varieties of Cucurbita argyrosperma, referred to as x ka'.

The dish is often described as having a nutty and smoky flavour, and a rich, creamy texture. It is compared to hummus by some English-language sources. The British food critic Jay Rayner described one preparation, made with chilli, as "like peanut butter wearing steel toe-capped boots".

== Preparation and serving ==
To prepare sikil pak, pumpkin seeds are first toasted and then cooled, to release their oils and intensify their texture and flavour. Different preparations of the dish may include aromatics such as garlic, green onion and habanero chillies. Any of these additional ingredients are roasted with the tomatoes until lightly charred. These are ground, along with the toasted pumpkin seeds in a molcajete or mortar and pestle. A food processor may also be used, though the final consistency should be somewhat coarse, retaining some texture rather than being ground to a smooth paste.

Coriander and lime juice are common modern additions to the dish, and are added during the grinding process. Epazote may also be used.

Sikil pak is traditionally served as an accompaniment to plain corn tortillas, though in contemporary settings it may also be paired with fried tortilla chips or tostadas, or served as an appetiser with vegetables.

== See Also ==
- Papadzules -- a Mayan dish of stuffed corn tortillas in a pumpkin seed sauce
- Muhammara -- a Syrian dip made from ground walnuts, pomegranate and roasted peppers
- Pkhali -- a Georgian dish made from ground walnuts and vegetables
