= Scallion bread =

Taiwanese green onion bread

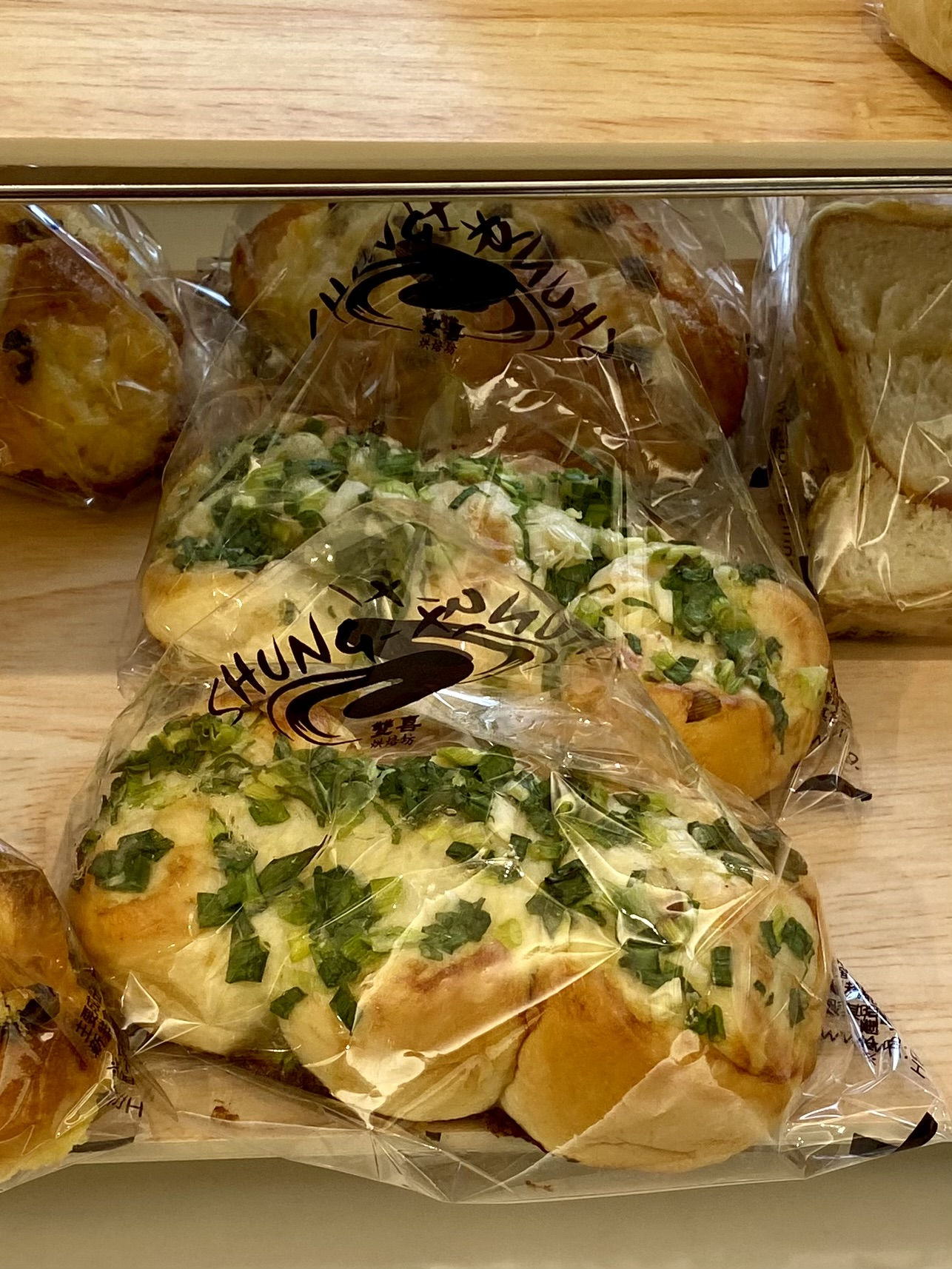
- Type: bread
- Course: Dessert
- Place of origin: Taiwan
- Main ingredients: chopped scallion, lard

Scallion Bread (Chinese: 蔥花麵包; pinyin: Cōng Hūa Mìan Bāo) is a popular snack in Taiwan, commonly enjoyed as a breakfast item or a light snack. Characterised by its green onion topping and use of traditional lard, this bread has a soft, fluffy texture and a distinctive aroma and can be found in bakeries across Taiwan.

== History ==
Taiwanese bread-making has its roots in the post-Japanese colonial era. During this time, some local bakeries embraced Western influences while others remained true to traditional flavours. Bread did not gain significant popularity in Taiwan, a rice-dominated culture, until after World War II and the Korean War. The presence of the U.S. military in Taiwan led to the establishment of bread baking training programmes, as American soldiers were unaccustomed to local steamed buns. During that time, resources were scarce, so the ingredients for bread were mostly locally available items, which led to the creation of the scallion bread. Packed with green onions and traditional lard seasoning—both staples in Taiwanese cuisine—the scallions develop a charred fragrance when baked at high temperatures, while the brushed egg wash forms a crispy edge.

== See also ==
- Onion roll
- Garlic bread
- Cong you bing – scallion pancake.
- Pissaladière
- Onion ring
- Onion bread (Zwiebelbrot)
