= Matty Matheson: A Cookbook =

2018 cookbook by Matty Matheson

- Author: Matty Matheson
- Language: English
- Subject: Home Cooking
- Published: 2018
- Publisher: Harry N. Abrams
- Publication place: United States of America
- Media type: Hardcover
- Pages: 288
- ISBN: 9781419732454

Matty Matheson: A Cookbook is a 2018 cookbook by Canadian chef Matty Matheson. It was named a New York Times Bestseller.

== Reception ==
The book was released to positive reviews. Esquire named it one of the best cookbooks of 2018.
