= Battuto (restaurant) =

Italian restaurant in Quebec City, Canada

- Interactive map of Battuto

Restaurant information
- Established: December 1, 2016
- Owners: Pascal Bussières; Paul Croteau; Guillaume St-Pierre
- Chef: Guillaume St-Pierre
- Food type: Italian
- Rating: Bib Gourmand (Michelin Guide)
- Location: 527 boulevard Langelier, Quebec City, Quebec, Canada
- Coordinates: 46.8104°N 71.2299°W
- Seating capacity: 24
- Website: www.battuto.ca

Battuto is an Italian restaurant in the Saint-Roch neighbourhood of Quebec City, Canada.

== History ==
The business is owned and operated by three friends, Pascal Bussières, Paul Croteau, and Guillaume St-Pierre. The three opened the restaurant in December 2016, with St-Pierre serving as the restaurant's head chef, Croteau as its pastry chef, and Bussières as sommelier.

Only 24 seats are available at the restaurant, most of which are counter seats wrapping the open kitchen area. Reservations are mandatory to dine at the restaurant, and are known to sell out within minutes once made available to book.

== Recognition ==
In 2025, the business received a 'Bib Gourmand' designation in Quebec's inaugural Michelin Guide. Per the guide, a Bib Gourmand recognition is awarded to restaurants who offer "exceptionally good food at moderate prices." Michelin boasted Battuto's "authentic and utterly indulgent Italian cooking made with impeccable skill".

Battuto was ranked the 'Best New Restaurant in Canada' in Air Canada's annual list of 10 best new restaurants in Canada in 2017.

In 2022, Battuto was awarded "Restaurant of the Year" at the annual Lauriers de la gastronomie québécoise awards, which are often considered the premier restaurant awards for the food and drink industry in the province of Quebec.

Montreal Gazette restaurant critic Lesley Chesterman gave Battuto 3 1/2 out of 4 stars in her August 2017 review, stating she "could not find a single off-note" in its food, and praising the menu as "simple, precise and authentic".

US-based food publication Eater lists Battuto among its "28 Best Restaurants in Quebec City," highlighting its "minimalist, refined approach to Italian cuisine".

Montreal based culinary magazine Tastet highlighted the restaurant's "simple, handmade dishes" that are rich in flavour and use seasonal ingredients.

=== Canada's 100 Best Restaurants Ranking ===
Battuto debuted on Canada's 100 Best Restaurants list in 2018, at #81. The restaurant spent multiple years on the list before falling off the ranking in the 2023 publication.

Battuto
Year	Rank	Change
2018	81	new
2019	83	▼2
2020	96	▼13
2021	No List	
2022	88	▲8
2023	▼ No Rank	
2024	▼ No Rank	
2025	▼ No Rank	
2026	▼ No Rank	

== See also ==
- List of Michelin Bib Gourmand Restaurants in Canada
