= Petrol pump =

Petrol pump may refer to:

- Filling station, a facility that sells fuel and lubricants for motor vehicles
- Gasoline pump, a device at a filling station that dispenses fuel

== See also ==
- Fuel pump, a component in liquid-fuelled engines
