= Quetzal (restaurant) =

Restaurant in Toronto, Ontario, Canada

- Interactive map of Quetzal

Restaurant information
- Established: August 8, 2018
- Owner: Grant van Gameren
- Head chef: Steven Molnar
- Food type: Mexican
- Rating: (Michelin Guide)
- Location: 419 College Street, Toronto, M5T 1T1, Canada
- Coordinates: 43°39′23.3″N 79°24′24.9″W
- Website: www.quetzaltoronto.com

Quetzal is a Mexican restaurant in Toronto, Ontario, Canada.

== History ==
The restaurant initially opened in August 2018, before temporarily closing six months later following a dispute between the restaurant owner and the then-chefs. At its opening, the restaurant was initially headed by co-chefs Julio Guajardo and Kate Chomyshyn.

The restaurant re-opened in March 2019, with its kitchen being headed by owner Grant van Gameren. Steve Molnar took over the head chef role in March 2020.

== Concept ==
Quetzal cooks its food solely over open flame, and does not have any traditional stoves or ovens.

== Recognition ==
The restaurant first received a Michelin star in 2022, and retained it in every following edition of the Michelin Guide. It is the first, and so far only, Mexican restaurant in the city to receive a star.

In 2025, Quetzal was ranked #11 in the inaugural North America's 50 Best Restaurants list, one of two Toronto restaurants making the ranking alongside Mhel. It ranked #8 in the 2026 publication.

=== Canada's 100 Best Restaurants Ranking ===
Quetzal ranked #4 in Canada's 100 Best Restaurants list in 2026, up from its previous ranking of #8 in 2025. It was the highest ranked restaurant in Toronto on the list in 2026.

Quetzal
Year	Rank	Change
2019	23	new
2020	68	▼45
2021	No List	
2022	76	▼8
2023	26	▲50
2024	12	▲14
2025	8	▲4
2026	4	▲4

== See also ==
- List of Mexican restaurants
- List of Michelin-starred restaurants in Toronto
