= Wine bar =

Tavern-like business focusing on selling wine

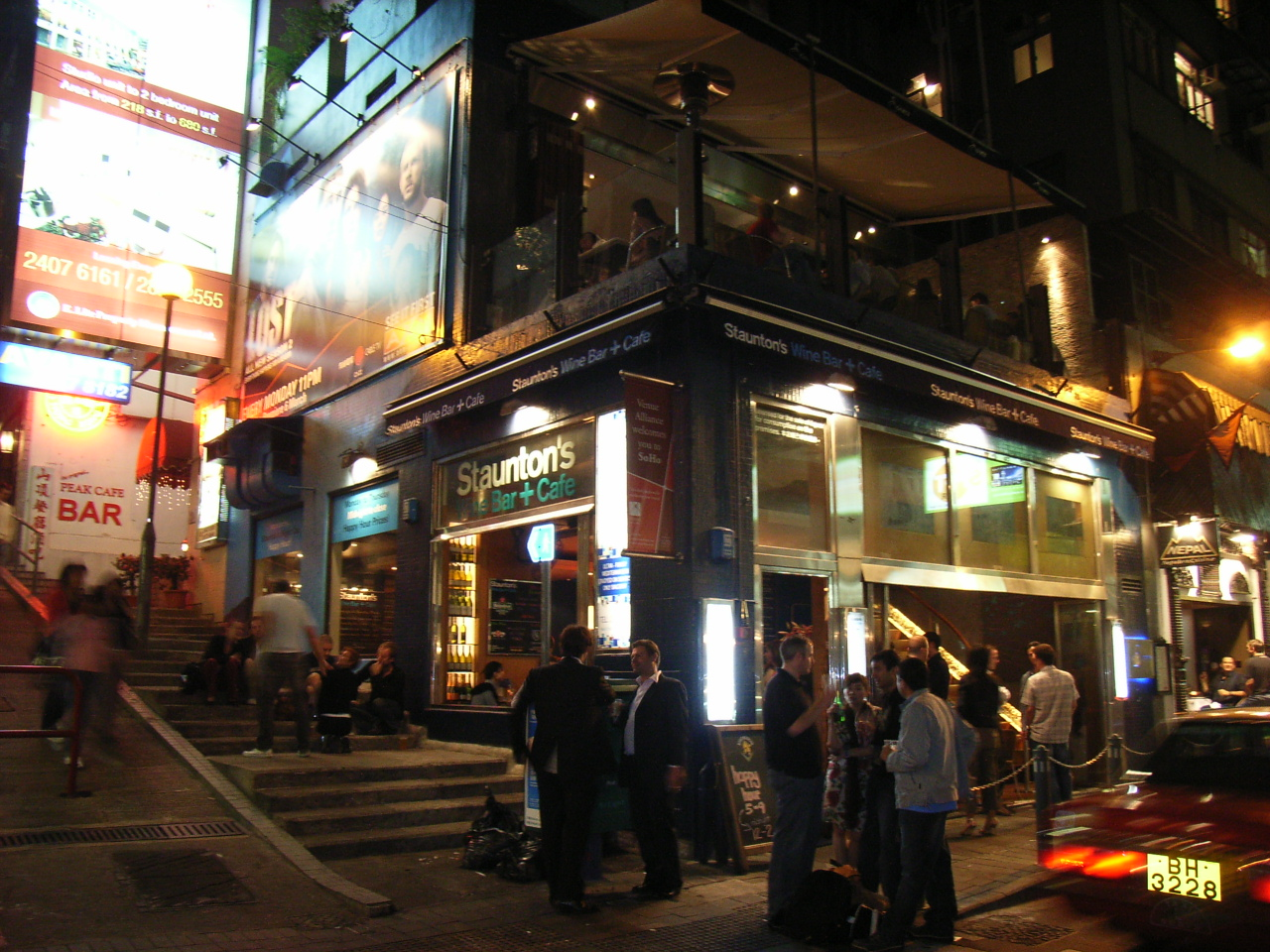
SOHO, Central, Hong Kong

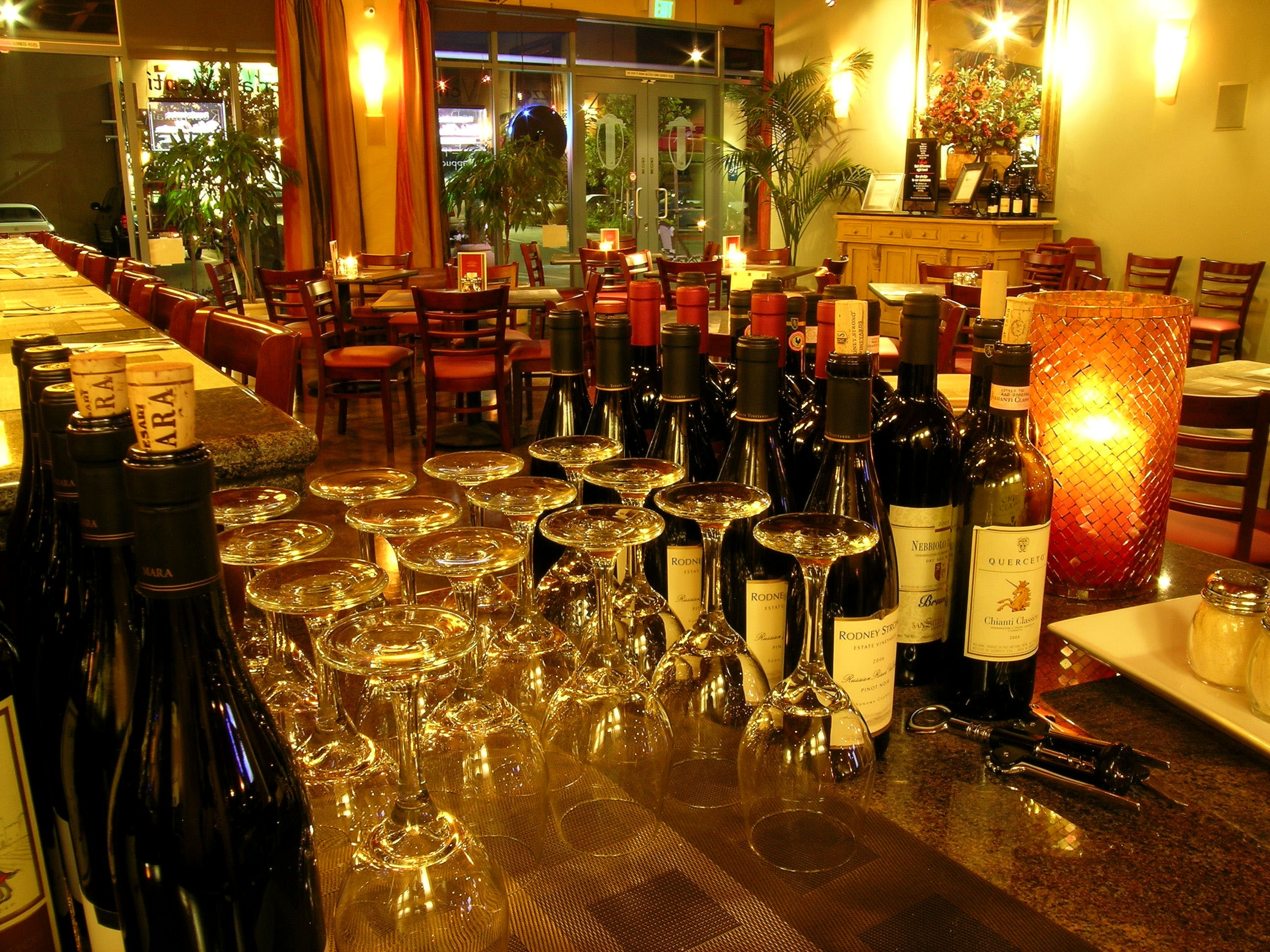
PV wine bar

A wine bar is a tavern-like business focusing on selling wine, rather than liquor or beer. A typical feature of many wine bars is a wide selection of wines available by the glass. Some wine bars are profiled on wines of a certain type of origin, such as Italian wine or Champagne. While many wine bars are private "stand-alone" establishments, in some cases, wine bars are associated with a specific wine retailer or other outlet of wine, to provide additional marketing for that retailer's wine portfolio. In countries where licensing regulations allow this, some wine bars also sell the wines they serve, and effectively function as a hybrid between a wine shop and a wine bar.

== United Kingdom ==
Wine bar chains in the UK include All Bar One.

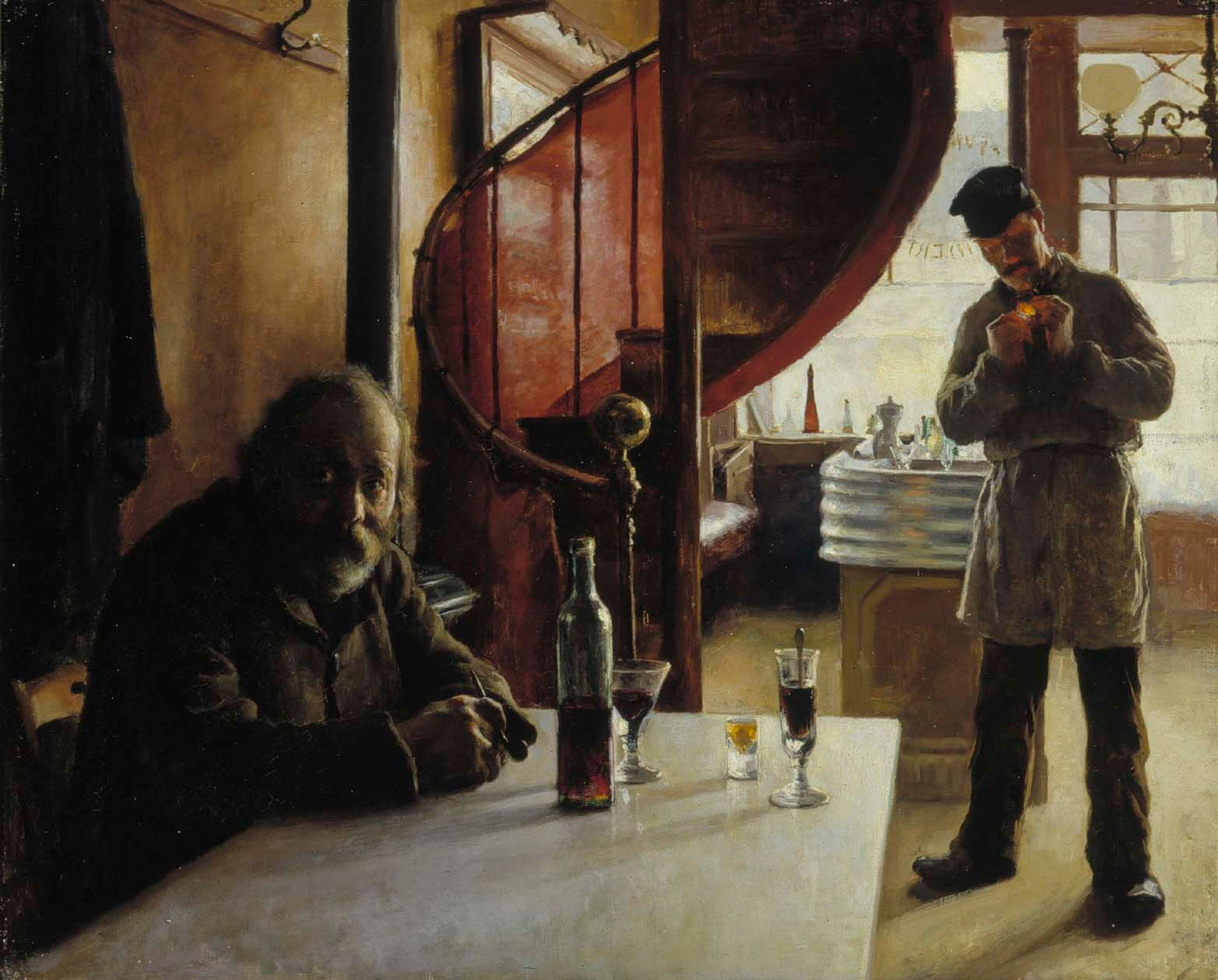
A French Wine Bar, 1888 painting by Eero Järnefelt.

== United States ==
Although the trend of wine bars in the United States was not well received in the 1980s, they began to gain popularity in the 1990s. By early 2000, wine bars became very popular and started popping up in many metropolitan neighborhoods across the country. Wine bars now rival local hangouts such as coffee shops and local bars. The wine bar phenomenon offers the 'taste before you buy' philosophy.

Wine bars offer an alternative to wine tasting. They aim to make wine more accessible by moving away from formal settings and extensive wine lists in favor of a casual atmosphere. Many feature booths, nooks, and comfortable seating designed to encourage guests to stay longer. Wine bars look to encourage conversation and socializing in an environment that is more intimate and laid-back than traditional bars.

Modern wine bars have begun to incorporate a larger variety of foods. Traditionally associated with cheeses and desserts, wine bars are looking to combine wine with appetizer-sized gourmet selections to enhance the palate. The concept brings the tastes of fancy restaurants to a dressed-down setting. Restaurant owners and chefs sometimes take the opposite approach and use wine bars as an opportunity for expansion.

== See also ==
- Types of drinking establishments
