= Legacy (The Bear) =

- The Bear episode
- Episode no.: Season 3 Episode 7
- Directed by: Joanna Calo
- Written by: Christopher Storer
- Cinematography by: Andrew Wehde
- Editing by: Adam Epstein
- Production code: XCBV3007
- Original air date: June 26, 2024
- Running time: 29 minutes

Guest appearances
- Molly Gordon as Claire Dunlap; Edwin Lee Gibson as Ebraheim; Ricky Staffieri as Theodore "Teddy" Fak; Adam Shapiro as Adam Shapiro; Corey Hendrix as Gary "Sweeps" Woods; Richard Esteras as Manny; José Cervantes as Angel; Davide Baroncini as neighborhood guy with cigar; Christopher Anthony Chang as neighborhood guy wearing glasses; William Reilly as Uncle Gary Fak; Penelope Walker as group facilitator; Matthew C. Yee as group participant

Episode chronology
← Previous "Napkins"	Next → "Ice Chips"
- The Bear season 3

"Legacy" is the seventh episode of the third season of the American television comedy-drama The Bear. It is the 25th overall episode of the series and was written by series creator Christopher Storer and directed by executive producer Joanna Calo. It was released on Hulu on June 26, 2024, along with the rest of the season.

The series follows Carmen "Carmy" Berzatto, an award-winning New York City chef de cuisine, who returns to his hometown of Chicago to run his late brother Michael's failing Italian beef sandwich shop.

In "Legacy," after the announcement of Chef Terry's retirement, Sydney gets a new offer from Adam Shapiro, who is attempting to pivot his career with backing from Ever's original investors. Tina tells Louie's birth story, Richie tells Evie's birth story, Carmy talks to Marcus and Sydney about family trees, some of Pop and Mikey's Original Beef guys rejoin the gang, and Sugar goes into labor.

== Plot ==
At an Al-Anon meeting, Carmy (Jeremy Allen White) listens as an attendee questions the value of apologies when one still has to deal with the consequences. Another attendee replies that the longer it takes to apologize to someone, the more painful it will be for the person to truly move on with their life. As Carmy considers this, he thinks about his relationship with Claire (Molly Gordon).

Sydney (Ayo Edebiri) meets again with Adam (Adam Shapiro), who reveals he is opening his own restaurant that plans to differentiate itself from Ever. He offers her the position of CDC, where she could earn more money than her salary at The Bear. Sydney strongly considers the offer, especially after she realizes that Carmy is undercutting her authority in the kitchen. Marcus (Lionel Boyce) finds a photo of Carmy with other high-level chefs, and Carmy explains that the collaboration between chefs is essential to build a "legacy", wherein they can mentor each other and share their recipes. As the previous chefs gave something to Carmy, Carmy wants to do the same with his successor.

The Bear rehires some of Mikey's old staff to help Ebra run the sandwich window, with Ebra (Edwin Lee Gibson) finding the joy in his work again in the process. Despite being due to give birth, Natalie (Abby Elliott) offers to go to Restaurant Depot to buy C-folds and other essential items for the kitchen. As the heavily pregnant Sugar is loading her car, her labor begins.

== Production ==
=== Development ===
In May 2024, Hulu confirmed that the seventh episode of the season would be titled "Legacy", and was to be written by series creator Christopher Storer and directed by executive producer Joanna Calo. It was Storer's 13th writing credit and Calo's sixth directing credit.

=== Filming ===
According to cinematographer Andrew Wehde, the opening shots in the kitchen and dining room are intended to convey Carmy's internal state of mind as well as spotlight Carmy and Richie as dual leaders of the restaurant: "Jeremy has always gotten the really close-focus lenses. There's something about being present with him, in his face, wider and tighter, whether that's a 50 or 40mm. He has these piercing blue eyes...Right away in 'Legacy,' one minute in, you have this close-focus shot of Jeremy and his eye, and he turns to look past the camera. We match-cut that to Ebon doing the same thing in the dining room, on his ear, listening, and he turns to the camera and it's on his eye. It's a match frame, the first moment where these two are kind of equals. It tells you everything about these characters and what they're going through and the chaos around them. This is when the pressure really sets in that it's up to them to succeed."

Syd's meeting with Shapiro was filmed on the back patio of Doma Café in River North. Wehde told Panavision in an interview published in 2025, "When Sydney goes to the restaurant Doma, we wanted to feel that she was hiding. She didn't want to tell everyone that she's meeting another chef. We wanted it to feel voyeuristic, so we used the 11:1s here, two cameras, cross coverage. We were on their back patio, and we threw the cameras as far away as possible and lived at 300 to 400mm...This is the first time that we actually felt like we also were hiding because of the scene. I remember Ayo being like, 'I didn't even know where the cameras were in there.'"

=== Music ===
Songs featured on the soundtrack of the episode include "No Machine" by Adrianne Lenker, "Save It for Later" by The Beat, "(You Gotta) Fight for Your Right (To Party!)" by Beastie Boys, "Stephanie" by Lindsey Buckingham, and "Up on the Roof" by Carole King. Composer Johnny Iguana contributed the music that plays while Sugar putters around Restaurant Depot before she goes into labor while loading her car.

== Reception ==
=== Critical reviews ===
Jenna Scherer of The A.V. Club gave the episode a "B–" grade and wrote, "Even the most legendary TV shows have fallen prey to the dreaded midseason slump—and it turns out that even a series as well-crafted as The Bear isn't immune. Maybe it's because season three lacks the propulsive drive of the previous chapter, when everyone was working toward a common goal on a tight deadline. But now that The Bear is up and running, the fire under the gang's collective ass has dwindled to a low simmer. Which leads us to the disjointed, meandering 'Legacy,' an episode that's as low-energy as its characters feel."

Marah Eakin of Vulture gave the episode a 3 star out of 5 rating and wrote, "Tina said at first you wait and wait, but then when the baby comes, everything goes by in an instant. It's not unlike The Bear, really, which you wait and wait and wait for and then it breezes by in a flash, binged over a couple of nights. With only three episodes left now, it's time to push." A.J. Daulerio of Decider wrote, "The happiness of certain memories colliding with the frequency of their traumatic results. Nicely constructed, but still lazy."

Brady Langmann of Esquire wrote, "And this season's Chekhov's gun finally blows: Sugar is about to go into labor...Gee, I bet everyone can't wait to welcome this newborn into generations of family trauma."

=== Accolades ===
Award	Category	Nominee	Result	Ref.
Primetime Emmy Awards	Outstanding Lead Actress in a Comedy Series	Ayo Edebiri	Nominated	
