= Apologies (The Bear) =

- The Bear episode
- Episode no.: Season 3 Episode 9
- Directed by: Christopher Storer
- Written by: Alex Russell
- Cinematography by: Andrew Wehde
- Editing by: Joanna Naugle
- Production code: XCBV3009
- Original air date: June 26, 2024
- Running time: 44 minutes

Guest appearances
- Oliver Platt as Jimmy "Cicero" Kalinowski; Molly Gordon as Claire Dunlap; Chris Witaske as Pete; Gillian Jacobs as Tiffany "Tiff" Jerimovich; Ricky Staffieri as Theodore "Teddy" Fak; Corey Hendrix as Gary "Sweeps" Woods; Brian Koppelman as Uncle Computer; Annabelle Toomey as Eva; Christian Litke as driver

Episode chronology
← Previous "Ice Chips"	Next → "Forever"
- The Bear season 3

"Apologies" is the ninth episode of the third season of the American television comedy-drama The Bear. It is the 27th overall episode of the series and was written by supervising producer Alex Russell, and directed by series creator Christopher Storer. It was released on Hulu on June 26, 2024, along with the rest of the season.

The series follows Carmen "Carmy" Berzatto, an award-winning New York City chef de cuisine, who returns to his hometown of Chicago to run his late brother Michael's failing Italian beef sandwich shop. In the episode, the staff awaits the review, while also preparing to attend a restaurant's funeral service.

== Plot ==
Marcus continues his study of legerdemain. As the Faks, Neil (Matty Matheson) and Theodore (Ricky Staffieri), help Carmy (Jeremy Allen White) behind the restaurant, they try to get him to apologize to Claire (Molly Gordon), but Carmy is too distracted to focus on Claire at the moment. He and the rest of the staff are waiting for the Chicago Tribune review, as it could set either their success or downfall. Carmy is deeply anxious about the review as they struggle through service, particularly with the Wagyu beef and pasta dishes; Carmy and Richie remain visibly estranged; Marcus worries that strain is eating Carmy alive.

Carmy and Sydney (Ayo Edebiri) continue having communication problems; Syd is frustrated with his lack of self-awareness. Carmy invites Sydney to the Ever "funeral service" closing dinner, which is scheduled to take place the following day (Sunday, when the Bear is closed), and she accepts. Alone, Carmy tries to call Claire but cannot bring himself to do it, so he only mutters "I'm sorry" to himself. He is later visited by Cicero (Oliver Platt), who explains the state of their situation; due to the rising costs, if the review is negative, he will have to back down his investment in the restaurant. Sydney feels jealous when she reads newspapers about The Bear, with Carmy receiving sole credit for its status. When she delivers food to Pete (Chris Witaske) and Natalie (Abby Elliott), she discovers from Pete that Carmy is offering her less money and fewer benefits as a partner than she would get working for Adam.

At a park, Richie (Ebon Moss-Bachrach) and Tiff (Gillian Jacobs) watch Eva (Annabelle Toomey) play. Tiff wants to know if Richie will attend her wedding, feeling that she does not have a lot of friends. Marcus (Lionel Boyce), Tina (Liza Colón-Zayas), and Sweeps (Corey Hendrix) all come in on their day off to work on the restaurant; Sweeps is studying "grapes," and Marcus helps Tina brainstorm a dish. Fak and Theodore visit Claire at the hospital, as unappointed messengers. They tell Claire that Carmy loves her more than he does himself, but Claire says she has not heard that from Carmy himself.

At his apartment, Carmy puts on a suit, preparing for the restaurant funeral. He finds a funeral card with a lamb on it and puts it on his dresser next to a scrunchie.

== Production ==
=== Development ===
In May 2024, Hulu confirmed that the ninth episode of the season would be titled "Apologies", and was to be written by supervising producer Alex Russell, and directed by series creator Christopher Storer. It was Russell's second writing credit and Storer's 18th directing credit.

=== Music ===
Songs featured on the soundtrack of the episode include "13 Ghosts II" by Nine Inch Nails (over the opening cinema-and-parlor-magic montage), "Are You Looking Up" by Mk.gee, "The Forever Rain" by Trent Reznor and Atticus Ross, "Hope We Can Again" by Nine Inch Nails, "Strange Currencies" by R.E.M., "Secret Love" by Stevie Nicks, "Blowing Kisses" by Jennifer Castle, "Constant Headache" by Tigers Jaw and Joyce Manor, and "A Murder of One" by Counting Crows.

== Reception ==
=== Critical reviews ===
Jenna Scherer of The A.V. Club gave the episode a "B–" grade and wrote, "That just sums up this season, doesn't it? Navel-gazing followed by more navel-gazing. Look, some of the greatest TV episodes in history have been all introspection with very little plot; The Bear itself made a delicacy of it in last year's 'Honeydew'. But watching Carm (and Sydney and Richie and Marcus and the friggin' Chicago Tribune) dwell on the same stuff for an entire season without making any moves isn't just unsatisfying, it's boring. I'm not saying I need to see these people make good choices; I just want them to make any choices at all."

Marah Eakin of Vulture gave the episode a 4 star out of 5 rating and wrote, "When the episode ends, Carm's dressed up sharp and heading out, leaving us a glimpse of the prayer card he either picked up at Marcus' mom's funeral or pulled out of The Bear since he didn't make it inside Mikey's. He's going to a funeral for a restaurant, but will it be a funeral for The Bear as well? Thank god we've only got the finale left, because I've really got to know how this all turns out." A.J. Daulerio of Decider wrote, "So that's FOUR major characters who cannot be honest with themselves. Carmy with his feelings; Sydney with her ambitions; Richie with heartbreak; Cicero with shame. The restaurant would have difficulty surviving if ONE of these essential employees was shading the truth. The Bear can only survive if everyone gets honest real quick. If not—REDRUM, lizards."

Josh Rosenberg of Esquire wrote, "As he's losing his mind over ravioli, she's reinserting a kid's shoulder back into its socket in the hospital. Just apologize, Berzatto!"
