= Next (The Bear) =

- The Bear episode
- Episode no.: Season 3 Episode 2
- Directed by: Christopher Storer
- Story by: Christopher Storer; Courtney Storer
- Teleplay by: Christopher Storer
- Cinematography by: Andrew Wehde
- Editing by: Joanna Naugle
- Production code: XCBV3002
- Original release date: June 26, 2024
- Running time: 27 minutes

Guest appearances
- Oliver Platt as Jimmy "Cicero" Kalinowski; Robert Townsend as Emmanuel Adamu; Edwin Lee Gibson as Ebraheim; Ricky Staffieri as Theodore Fak; Corey Hendrix as Gary "Sweeps" Woods; Christopher J. Zucchero as Chi-Chi

Episode chronology
← Previous "Tomorrow"	Next → "Doors"
- The Bear season 3

"Next" is the second episode of the third season of the American television comedy-drama The Bear. It is the 20th overall episode of the series and was written and directed by series creator Christopher Storer from a story he co-wrote with co-executive producer and culinary producer Courtney Storer. It was released on Hulu on June 26, 2024, along with the rest of the season.

The series follows Carmen "Carmy" Berzatto, an award-winning New York City chef de cuisine, who returns to his hometown of Chicago to run his late brother Michael's failing Italian beef sandwich shop. In the episode, Carmy's list of "non-negotiables" causes chaos in the restaurant.

== Plot ==
Carmy (Jeremy Allen White) introduces the "non-negotiables" list to the restaurant, explaining that he is hoping to elevate the restaurant to higher profile by aiming for one Michelin star. Sydney (Ayo Edebiri), however, is taken aback by the list, especially for a section where it is revealed that the menu is changing every day. Carmy also gives her a "vesting agreement", wherein they will discuss her stake at the restaurant so she can "push" him and vice versa.

Richie (Ebon Moss-Bachrach) arrives annoyed that Carmy reorganized the dining room without consulting him, and grows more upset when he reads the non-negotiable list. Their argument escalates as Richie questions Carmy's apology, and Richie goes as far as to mock Carmy for failing in his relationship with Claire. As Tina (Liza Colón-Zayas), Ebraheim (Edwin Lee Gibson) and Cicero (Oliver Platt) arrive, the staff gets into arguments over the structure. It is also revealed that some of the employees have quit their jobs, citing a "dysfunctional" environment. The conflict ends as Marcus (Lionel Boyce) arrives, and they get to work to get his mind off his mother's death.

Carmy approaches Marcus, and is surprised when he quickly accepts the "non-negotiables" list unlike the rest of the staff. Carmy offers his condolences, and Marcus deduces that he was meant to be in the kitchen when his mother died, feeling that was what she would've wanted. He is intent in making the restaurant work, and asks Carmy to "take us there." Carmy agrees to do it.

== Production ==
=== Development ===
In May 2024, Hulu confirmed that the second episode of the season would be titled "Next", and was to be written by series creator Christopher Storer from a story he co-wrote with co-executive producer, culinary producer, and sister Courtney Storer, and directed by Christopher. It was Christopher's ninth writing credit, Courtney's first writing credit, and Christopher's 14th directing credit.

=== Filming ===
The scenes involving the main cast were filmed in just two days, with the first day filming the first 20 pages of the script, while the remainder was filmed the following day. Jeremy Allen White loved the episode's ending, saying "Stepping outside yourself, looking at Marcus and getting Marcus's thumbs up when he says, 'Take us there,' the writing in that episode is so beautiful. It was just so easy." When questioned over Sydney's interaction with Carmy over the agreement, Ayo Edebiri explained, "I think she's always balancing his validation and his style of communication, because he will do a gesture but not necessarily say what he's thinking or feeling. So I think even though he does [assure she's a partner], it's actually quite complicated. She's sort of like, 'Is that true? You're offering me this thing. But what does it actually mean?'"

According to cinematographer Andrew Wehde, one of the visual goals for season three was to "introduce sunlight...with Carmy working at the island...by himself, we were using large-source tungsten lights to bring in that sunlight as if it's reflecting off the high rises. It looked like the sun was a big orange light blooming through the front window, and it felt like it was pushing all the way into the back of the restaurant. That was the big change, adding that warm sun into the restaurant, knowing that Carmy's changing, he's evolving, and that time is moving forward."

=== Music ===
Songs featured on the soundtrack of the episode include an Eddie Vedder cover of "Save It for Later" by The Beat, and "(Nice Dream)" by Radiohead. Vedder, who was born and spent his earliest years in Evanston, Illinois, regularly plays the song in live sets but this version was recorded in studio "specifically for The Bear."

== Reception ==
=== Critical reviews ===
Jenna Scherer of The A.V. Club gave the episode an "A–" grade and wrote, "After an oddly sluggish season premiere, "Next" returns us to the show's baseline. Whereas "Tomorrow" roved the world and was extremely light on dialogue, "Next" restores the frenetic, overlapping rhythms that first made us fall in love with The Original Beef: a freewheeling jazz beat, the alto sax screeching with rancor even as the bassist strums a steady heartbeat of unconditional love."

Alan Sepinwall of Rolling Stone praised its opening sequence and wrote, "What could at first just feel like a collection of glorified establishing shots turns into something else when many of the people begin waving at the camera. For a few minutes, the verisimilitude of the rest of The Bear goes away, and we are watching people excited to be on TV, and proud to have their hard work recognized by this show. The Bear is always a love letter to the people who make and serve our food, and who clean up after us; it's just more openly doing that in this montage."

Marah Eakin of Vulture gave the episode a 3 star out of 5 rating and wrote, "The show keeps inserting these shots of Carmy basically vibrating with adrenaline and stress, and while that could just be how Carmy is, it's also kind of threatening. There's no way he can sustain this pace, this pressure, and this level of stress. Something's going to have to give."

A.J. Daulerio of Decider wrote, "It's easy to forget, but The Bear is billed in most awards-show categories as a "comedy," and sometimes it can even pull it off despite its swirling darkness. "Next" gets off to a promising start with a visit from one of Carmy's sleazy neighborhood pals who's there to drop off micro radishes and collect money in an envelope." Josh Rosenberg of Esquire wrote, "With our road map officially set, we'll see how it plays out when the restaurant opens its doors. Say what you will about the disarray, but I'm excited for the courses ahead of us. Hopefully, we just won't have to wait until season 4, episode 10 for Carmy to learn that he doesn't have to go it alone."

Writing in Decider, Rachel Rosenfield praised the episode's opening montage. The scenes, which play under Eddie Vedder's cover version of "Save It for Later," featured a collection of early morning scenes with it being described as "in some ways, this song is used as a love letter to the essential workers of Chicago, many of whom have been hard at work for hours while the rest of teeming masses are still dozing peacefully in their bedrooms."
