= The Bear season 3 =

Season of television series

The Bear
- Season 3
- Official promotional posters for season 3 from Hulu
- Showrunners: Christopher Storer; Joanna Calo
- Starring: Jeremy Allen White; Ebon Moss-Bachrach; Ayo Edebiri; Lionel Boyce; Abby Elliott; Matty Matheson; Liza Colón-Zayas
- No. of episodes: 10

Release
- Original network: FX on Hulu
- Original release: June 26, 2024

Season chronology
- ← Previous; Season 2 Next → Season 4

The third season of the American comedy-drama television series The Bear premiered with all episodes on June 26, 2024, on FX on Hulu. Christopher Storer and Joanna Calo serve as showrunners for the season. FX renewed the series for a ten-episode third season in November 2023. Jeremy Allen White stars as Carmy Berzatto, an award-winning chef who returns to his hometown of Chicago to manage the chaotic kitchen at his deceased brother's sandwich shop.

Ebon Moss-Bachrach, Ayo Edebiri, Lionel Boyce, Abby Elliott, Matty Matheson, and Liza Colón-Zayas return from the previous season as the supporting cast. In November 2023, following the release of the second season, FX renewed The Bear for a third season, which began filming in February 2024 in Chicago. The season consists of ten episodes, and received positive reviews.

== Cast and characters ==
=== Main ===
- Jeremy Allen White as Carmen "Carmy" Berzatto
- Ebon Moss-Bachrach as Richard "Richie" Jerimovich
- Ayo Edebiri as Sydney Adamu
- Lionel Boyce as Marcus Brooks
- Abby Elliott as Natalie "Sugar" Berzatto
- Matty Matheson as Neil Fak
- Liza Colón-Zayas as Tina Marrero

=== Recurring ===
- Jon Bernthal as Michael "Mikey" Berzatto
- Joel McHale as David Fields
- Edwin Lee Gibson as Ebraheim
- Corey Hendrix as Gary "Sweeps" Woods
- Oliver Platt as Jimmy "Cicero" Kalinowski
- José Cervantes as Angel
- Richard Esteras as Manny
- Chris Witaske as Pete
- Molly Gordon as Claire Dunlap
- Robert Townsend as Emmanuel Adamu
- Ricky Staffieri as Theodore "Teddy" Fak
- Adam Shapiro as Adam Shapiro
- Christopher Zucchero as Chi-Chi

=== Guest ===
- Carmen Christopher as Chester
- Gillian Jacobs as Tiffany "Tiff" Jerimovich
- Mitra Jouhari as Kelly
- Will Poulter as Luca
- Jamie Lee Curtis as Donna Berzatto
- Olivia Colman as Chef Andrea Terry
- Sarah Ramos as Jessica
- Andrew Lopez as Garrett
- Rene Gube as Rene
- Annabelle Toomey as Evie Jerimovich
- John Mulaney as Stevie
- David Zayas as David
- John Cena as Sammy Fak
- Brian Koppelman as Nicholas "The Computer" Marshall
- Josh Hartnett as Frank
- Daniel Boulud as himself
- René Redzepi as himself
- Thomas Keller as himself

== Episodes ==
No. overall	No. in season	Title	Directed by	Written by	Original release date	Prod. code
19	1	"Tomorrow"	Christopher Storer	Story by : Christopher Storer & Matty Matheson; Teleplay by : Christopher Storer	June 26, 2024	XCBV3001
After being freed from the walk-in, Carmy apologizes to Sydney for abandoning the team and promises never to make the same mistake again. He also leaves Richie a message apologizing for his tirade. Marcus learns his mother has died, and Sydney calls to offer her condolences. Flashbacks recount Carmy's time working for renowned chefs at various restaurants, including Chef Terry at Ever alongside Luca, René Redzepi at Noma, Daniel Boulud at Daniel, and David Fields at Empire in New York, where Sydney was one of his patrons. During this time, Carmy also deals with Mikey's death and subsequent funeral, which Carmy is revealed to have observed from his car but could not bring himself to attend. In the present, Carmy arrives early to The Bear and draws upon his past work experience to craft a new menu and a list of "non-negotiables" for the restaurant to follow.
20	2	"Next"	Christopher Storer	Story by : Christopher Storer & Courtney Storer; Teleplay by : Christopher Storer	June 26, 2024	XCBV3002
Carmy's non-negotiables prove controversial among the rest of the staff, particularly his decision to change the menu every single day. Carmy tells Sydney he sent her a partnership agreement to formalize her stake in the restaurant. Richie and Carmy remain at odds despite the latter's apology. At Richie's provocation, Carmy tells the others about what he said to Claire. The group immediately stops arguing when Marcus suddenly arrives; he insists upon focusing on the work to get his mind off his mother's death. Carmy privately offers his support, but Marcus says he is grateful to have been in the kitchen when his mother died, feeling it is what she would have wanted. He urges Carmy to lead The Bear to success.
21	3	"Doors"	Duccio Fabbri	Story by : Christopher Storer & Will Guidara; Teleplay by : Christopher Storer	June 26, 2024	XCBV3003
Following Marcus' mother's funeral, the team endures a chaotic first month of service at The Bear. Carmy's daily menu changes quickly drive up the restaurant's expenses, angering Natalie and Cicero, while Richie attempts to implement his own set of non-negotiables, much to Carmy's chagrin. Carmy himself struggles to keep his composure amidst the high-pressure environment of the kitchen, with Sydney frequently having to manage his temper. Carmy and Richie eventually have a physical altercation that leads to the restaurant's expo sheets flying off the table, making Sydney realize the extent of the kitchen's dysfunction.
22	4	"Violet"	Christopher Storer	Christopher Storer	June 26, 2024	XCBV3004
Sydney gets a new apartment, despite her father's concerns that it is both more expensive and a further commute from the restaurant than living with him. Sydney is later approached on the street by Ever CDC Adam Shapiro, who reveals he discreetly visited The Bear and observed the chaos in the kitchen, while praising Sydney's skills. Richie has an awkward conversation with Tiff's fiancee Frank, making him wonder whether his presence in his daughter's life is confusing her, but Natalie encourages him to continue being there for her. Natalie receives word that The Chicago Tribune plans to write a review of The Bear, causing the staff to realize that their food critic has already visited the restaurant.
23	5	"Children"	Christopher Storer	Christopher Storer	June 26, 2024	XCBV3005
As the team prepares the restaurant to be photographed for the review, Cicero brings in family friend Nicholas "The Computer" Marshall to help the restaurant cut costs and trim inefficiencies. One of his recommendations is to let go of Marcus or reduce his pay, which Natalie swiftly shuts down. The team also scrambles to prepare a duck dish mentioned in the review, whose ingredients they do not have on hand due to the daily menu changes. Chef Terry unexpectedly closes Ever, making Carmy doubt The Bear's own future.
24	6	"Napkins"	Ayo Edebiri	Catherine Schetina	June 26, 2024	XCBV3006
Some years before the events of the series, Tina is laid off from her longtime office job during a difficult financial period for her family. As she goes about her daily routine raising her son Louie with her husband David, she travels to different businesses across Chicago trying to find work and facing rejection everywhere. Losing hope, she makes a stop at the Original Beef for a coffee, and is offered a sandwich by Richie on the house. Mikey notices her crying in the dining room and offers a sympathetic ear as they commiserate over how the world has beaten them down, noting that they still find hope in the younger generation: Tina expresses her begrudging admiration for some of the younger workers she has seen in her job hunt, while Mikey brings up his pride in Carmy. Mikey offers her a job as a line cook.
25	7	"Legacy"	Joanna Calo	Christopher Storer	June 26, 2024	XCBV3007
Carmy attends an Al-Anon meeting where another attendee expresses doubts over the value of apologies due to having to deal with the consequences of the apologizer's prior actions, while another attendee insists that letting an unspoken apology fester is worse. Adam reveals to Sydney he wants to open his own restaurant and offers her a job as his CDC, further complicating her hesitancy to sign her agreement with Carmy. Carmy shares with Marcus his thoughts on how chefs define their legacies based on the different restaurants they work at. The Bear rehires some of Mikey's old staff to help Ebra run the sandwich window, with Ebra finding the joy in his work again in the process. Sydney starts to resent Carmy for undercutting her authority in the kitchen. Natalie travels to Restaurant Depot to get supplies, only to go into labor in the parking lot.
26	8	"Ice Chips"	Christopher Storer	Joanna Calo	June 26, 2024	XCBV3008
Unable to get in touch with Pete or anyone at the restaurant due to the start of service, Natalie reluctantly calls her mother to meet her at the hospital. Although their reunion starts off rocky, Donna successfully helps calm Natalie down during her contractions. While waiting for Pete to arrive, Donna cheers her up by telling stories of the births of Mikey, Carmy, and her. Natalie confesses that she did not initially tell Donna about her pregnancy due to fear over spreading the family's dysfunction to her child; Donna expresses her regrets over her behavior and promises she is trying to get better. When Pete arrives, an emotionally drained Donna quietly exits the hospital room to wait in reception, where she is comforted by the Faks.
27	9	"Apologies"	Christopher Storer	Alex Russell	June 26, 2024	XCBV3009
The Faks urge Carmy to apologize to Claire, which he considers but continually puts off. Carmy invites Sydney to the Ever "funeral service" closing dinner. The staff anxiously await the Tribune review. Cicero warns Carmy that, with the finances in dire straits, he will likely have to pull out if it is negative. Richie ponders whether to attend Tiff and Frankie's wedding, with Tiff urging him to do so. With the restaurant closed for the day so Carmy, Sydney, and Richie can attend the Ever dinner, Marcus and Tina help each other experiment with their own dishes. Sydney delivers food to Pete and Natalie, and discovers from Pete that Carmy is offering her less money and fewer benefits as a partner than she would get working for Adam. The Faks visit Claire at her job and implore her to reach out to Carmy, telling her he feels sorry but is too nervous to talk to her.
28	10	"Forever"	Christopher Storer	Christopher Storer	June 26, 2024	XCBV3010
Carmy, Sydney and Richie attend the Ever closing dinner. Richie spends time with Garrett and Jessica while they run service, while Carmy reconnects with Luca, who plans to stay in Chicago for a few months to visit his sister. Sydney converses with Luca and various renowned chefs as they share their stories from past kitchens, and is struck by their aversion to dysfunctional kitchen environments. Carmy confronts David Fields and accuses him of ruining his self-worth; he snidely claims Carmy should be thanking him as his abuse towards Carmy made him a better chef. Adam reminds Sydney about his prior offer, to which she states she is still interested. Chef Terry explains her choice to close the restaurant to Carmy, explaining she was tired of the constant stress and wanted to finish her career on her own terms. After the service, Sydney hosts an afterparty at her apartment attended by Luca, Chef Terry, and members of The Bear and Ever's staff. Noticing the Original Beef's old four-star review and thinking about how the staff has changed since, Sydney runs out of her apartment and has a panic attack. Carmy checks his phone to discover several missed calls from Cicero and Computer, along with the Tribune review.

== Production ==
=== Development ===
In November 2023, following the release of the second season, FX renewed The Bear for a 10-episode third season. The season was announced with co-showrunners Christopher Storer and Joanna Calo serving as executive producers, along with Hiro Murai, Josh Senior and star Matty Matheson.

=== Writing ===
Season 3 covers the period from May 28 to August 6, 2023. The episode "Doors" covers almost six weeks in June and July 2023.

Storer wrote all episodes in the season, except "Napkins", "Ice Chips" and "Apologies", which were respectively written by Catherine Schetina, Calo, and supervising producer Alex Russell.

=== Casting ===
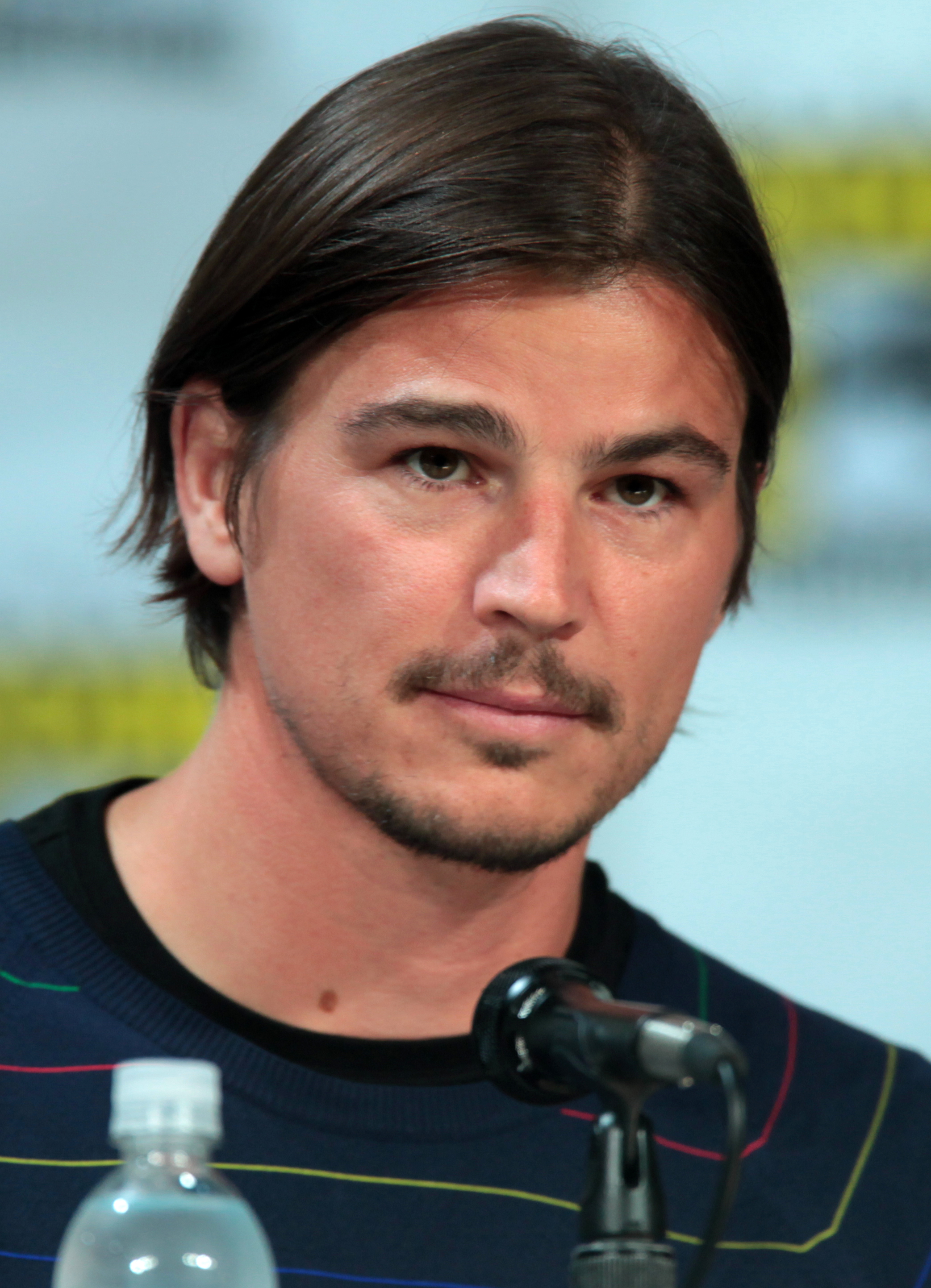
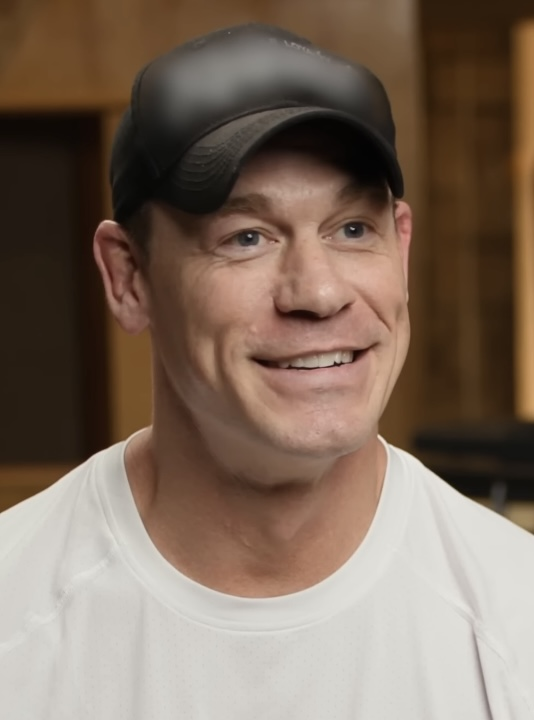
Josh Hartnett and John Cena joined the third season as guest stars.

Josh Hartnett was cast as Tiffany's fiancé after meeting Storer years prior when they discussed a possible role for a film. Hartnett accepted the role without even reading the script. John Cena was cast as Sammy Fak. "Forever" features cameos by Christina Tosi and Grant Achatz.

=== Costuming ===
Costume designer Courtney Wheeler told GQ that picking out vintage neckties to go with Fak's suits was her special "pride and joy" in styling season three.

=== Set decoration and props ===
Ceramicist Jono Pandolfi sent The Bear crew "a ton—probably 1,000 to 2,000 pieces, like a full restaurant load" of their plates and bowls for use in the on-screen Bear restaurant. The restaurant uses dishes from the Coupe and Square-Side lines.

In reality as on the show, a large budget line item in season 3 was fresh flowers for the restaurant. When not being immediately used for filming the flowers were stored in a backstage refrigerator to protect them from the heat generated by soundstage lights, engines, and bodies.

=== Filming ===
Filming for the third season began in February 2024. In March 2024, scenes depicting the cast filming a funeral for "Doors" leaked to the Internet, with fans speculating that they would attend Marcus' mother's funeral. The church scenes of Mikey's funeral in the "Tomorrow" flashbacks, Angela's funeral in "Doors", and Natalie praying in "Children" were filmed at St. Mary's Catholic Church (St. John XXIII Parish) on Lake Street in Evanston, Illinois.

The second episode, "Next", was filmed in just two days. Main cast member Ayo Edebiri directed the sixth episode of the season, "Napkins", after joining the Directors Guild of America. Parts of the fourth season were filmed during filming for this season.

According to Scott D. Smith, the head of the sound production team since the pilot episode, "Overall, this season is much quieter than the previous two seasons." Cinematographer Andrew Wehde told Panavision about filming the show generally, and season 3 specifically, "The thing that I get from Chris [Storer] is that each season it's important to not be doing the same thing, not to repeat the trick. It's a weird thing because television's all about consistency, but he finds consistency through storytelling and characters and allows each episode to live and breathe as its own little film...They have different music, different pacing, and the emotions are different, but they connect so well because of repeat locations, the tone, and who the characters are."

=== Music ===
The song used in the season 3 trailer is "Mixed Emotions" by the Rolling Stones, and "an added layer of resonance comes from the song's inspiration—the fractured relationship between Mick Jagger and Keith Richards that nearly derailed The Stones in the mid-'80s—which echoes Carmy's strained partnerships with Syd and Richie."

According to a Block Club Chicago feature on composers Jeffrey Qaiyum and Johnny Iguana, "season 3 is quieter overall than the first two seasons, both in terms of score and 'needle drop' songs. Qaiyum praised the producers for pulling the whole thing together and not bogging down scenes with music that don't need it."

== Release ==
The third season of The Bear was originally scheduled to premiere on June 27, 2024, but ended up releasing on June 26, 2024, on Hulu and Disney+.

== Reception ==
=== Critical response ===
On Rotten Tomatoes, 89% of 87 critics gave the third season a positive review, with an average rating of 7.9/10. The website's critics consensus states. "Having set an exceedingly high standard of excellence for itself, The Bear spends its third season simmering, stewing, and giving off an aroma that whets the appetite." The website also reported that the season was "as audacious as ever" and it "still seems to continue delivering compelling and often intense television with performances that are so dependably brilliant that they're not even mentioned in most of the reviews. Instead, at this point in a show's life, it's easier to find faults in its sameness or changes, or in its attempts to repeat or outdo itself." Metacritic assigned it a weighted average score of 80 out of 100 based on 44 critic reviews.

James Poniewozik of The New York Times wrote, "It is for the third season of The Bear, in which one of the most brilliant shows on TV attempts a complex, at times confusing, elaboration on its themes. The 10 episodes are often innovative in execution but sometimes stale in their repetition of established conflicts. It's an astonishing display of talent. But it is likely to leave anyone hoping for narrative momentum disappointed."

=== Accolades ===
The third season received 13 nominations for the 77th Primetime Emmy Awards. Notable nominations include Outstanding Comedy Series, Jeremy Allen White for Outstanding Lead Actor in a Comedy Series, Ayo Edebiri for Outstanding Lead Actress in a Comedy Series and Outstanding Directing for a Comedy Series (for the episode "Napkins"), Ebon Moss-Bachrach for Outstanding Supporting Actor in a Comedy Series, Liza Colón-Zayas for Outstanding Supporting Actress in a Comedy Series, Jon Bernthal for Outstanding Guest Actor in a Comedy Series and Olivia Colman and Jamie Lee Curtis for Outstanding Guest Actress in a Comedy Series.

Year	Award	Category	Nominee(s)	Result	Ref.
2025	American Cinema Editors Awards	Best Edited Single-Camera Comedy Series	Joanna Naugle (for "Tomorrow")	Nominated	
2025	Artios Awards	Outstanding Achievement in Casting – Television Comedy Series	Jeanie Bacharach, Mickie Paskal, Jennifer Rudnicke, AJ Links, Kaitlin Shaw	Nominated	
2025	Cinema Audio Society Awards	Outstanding Achievement in Sound Mixing for Television Series – Half Hour	Scott D. Smith, Steve "Major" Giammaria, Patrick Christensen, Kendall Barron, Ryan Collison, Connor Nagy (for "Doors")	Won	
2025	Critics' Choice Television Awards	Best Supporting Actress in a Comedy Series	Liza Colón-Zayas	Nominated	
2025	Directors Guild of America Awards	Outstanding Directing – Comedy Series	Ayo Edebiri (for "Napkins")	Nominated	
2025	Directors Guild of America Awards	Outstanding Directing – Comedy Series	Duccio Fabbri (for "Doors")	Nominated	
2025	Directors Guild of America Awards	Outstanding Directing – Comedy Series	Christopher Storer (for "Tomorrow")	Nominated	
2025	Golden Globe Awards	Best Television Series – Musical or Comedy	The Bear	Nominated	
2025	Golden Globe Awards	Best Actor – Television Series Musical or Comedy	Jeremy Allen White	Won	
2025	Golden Globe Awards	Best Actress – Television Series Musical or Comedy	Ayo Edebiri	Nominated	
2025	Golden Globe Awards	Best Supporting Actor – Series, Miniseries or Television Film	Ebon Moss-Bachrach	Nominated	
2025	Golden Globe Awards	Best Supporting Actress – Series, Miniseries or Television Film	Liza Colón-Zayas	Nominated	
2025	Golden Reel Awards	Outstanding Achievement in Sound Editing – Broadcast Short Form	Steve "Major" Giammaria, Jonathan Fuhrer, Matt Snedecor, Craig LoGiudice, John Bowen, Evan Benjamin, Annie Taylor, Leslie Bloome, Shaun Brennan ()for "Doors"	Nominated	
2025	Golden Reel Awards	Outstanding Achievement in Music Editing – Broadcast Short Form	Jason Lingle, Jeff Lingle (for "Doors")	Nominated	
2025	Primetime Emmy Awards	Outstanding Comedy Series	The Bear	Nominated	
2025	Primetime Emmy Awards	Outstanding Lead Actor in a Comedy Series	Jeremy Allen White (for "Tomorrow")	Nominated	
2025	Primetime Emmy Awards	Outstanding Lead Actress in a Comedy Series	Ayo Edebiri (for "Legacy")	Nominated	
2025	Primetime Emmy Awards	Outstanding Supporting Actor in a Comedy Series	Ebon Moss-Bachrach (for "Doors")	Nominated	
2025	Primetime Emmy Awards	Outstanding Supporting Actress in a Comedy Series	Liza Colón-Zayas (for "Napkins")	Nominated	
2025	Primetime Emmy Awards	Outstanding Directing for a Comedy Series	Ayo Edebiri (for "Napkins")	Nominated	
2025	Primetime Creative Arts Emmy Awards	Outstanding Guest Actor in a Comedy Series	Jon Bernthal (for "Napkins")	Nominated	
2025	Primetime Creative Arts Emmy Awards	Outstanding Guest Actress in a Comedy Series	Olivia Colman (for "Forever")	Nominated	
2025	Primetime Creative Arts Emmy Awards	Outstanding Guest Actress in a Comedy Series	Jamie Lee Curtis (for "Ice Chips")	Nominated	
2025	Primetime Creative Arts Emmy Awards	Outstanding Casting for a Comedy Series	Jeanie Bacharach, Maggie Bacharach, Jennifer Rudnicke, and Mickie Paskal	Nominated	
2025	Primetime Creative Arts Emmy Awards	Outstanding Single-Camera Picture Editing for a Comedy Series	Joanna Naugle (for "Tomorrow")	Nominated	
2025	Primetime Creative Arts Emmy Awards	Outstanding Sound Editing for a Comedy or Drama Series (Half-Hour)	Steve "Major" Giammaria, Craig LoGiudice, Evan Benjamin, John Bowen, Jonathan Fuhrer, Matt Snedecor, Annie Taylor, Jeff Lingle, Jason Lingle, Leslie Bloome, and Shaun Brennan (for "Doors")	Nominated	
2025	Primetime Creative Arts Emmy Awards	Outstanding Sound Mixing for a Comedy or Drama Series (Half-Hour) and Animation	Scott D. Smith, Steve "Major" Giammaria, Patrick Christensen, and Ryan Collison (for "Doors")	Nominated	
2025	Satellite Awards	Best Actor in a Comedy or Musical Series	Jeremy Allen White	Nominated	
2025	Satellite Awards	Best Actress in a Comedy or Musical Series	Ayo Edebiri	Nominated	
2025	Satellite Awards	Best Actor in a Supporting Role in a Series, Miniseries & Limited Series, or Motion Picture Made for Television	Ebon Moss-Bachrach	Nominated	
2025	Screen Actors Guild Awards	Outstanding Performance by an Ensemble in a Comedy Series	Lionel Boyce, Liza Colón-Zayas, Ayo Edebiri, Abby Elliott, Edwin Lee Gibson, Corey Hendrix, Matty Matheson, Ebon Moss-Bachrach, Ricky Staffieri, and Jeremy Allen White	Nominated	
2025	Screen Actors Guild Awards	Outstanding Performance by a Male Actor in a Comedy Series	Jeremy Allen White	Nominated	
2025	Screen Actors Guild Awards	Outstanding Performance by a Female Actor in a Comedy Series	Liza Colón-Zayas	Nominated	
2025	Screen Actors Guild Awards	Outstanding Performance by a Female Actor in a Comedy Series	Ayo Edebiri	Nominated	
