= Doors (The Bear) =

- The Bear episode
- Episode no.: Season 3 Episode 3
- Directed by: Duccio Fabbri
- Story by: Christopher Storer; Will Guidara
- Teleplay by: Christopher Storer
- Cinematography by: Andrew Wehde
- Editing by: Adam Epstein
- Production code: XCBV3003
- Original release date: June 26, 2024
- Running time: 30 minutes

Guest appearances
- Oliver Platt as Jimmy "Cicero" Kalinowski; Edwin Lee Gibson as Ebraheim; Ricky Staffieri as Theodore Fak; Corey Hendrix as Gary "Sweeps" Woods; Carmen Christopher as Chester; Richard Esteras as Manny; José Cervantes as Angel; Terrence Carey as kitchen-tour customer; Matt Kozlowski

Episode chronology
| ← Previous "Next" | Next → "Violet" |
- The Bear season 3

"Doors" is the third episode of the third season of the American television comedy-drama The Bear. It is the 21st overall episode of the series and was written by series creator Christopher Storer from a story he co-wrote with co-producer Will Guidara, and directed by co-producer Duccio Fabbri. It was released on Hulu on June 26, 2024, along with the rest of the season.

The series follows Carmen "Carmy" Berzatto, an award-winning New York City chef de cuisine, who returns to his hometown of Chicago to run his late brother Michael's failing Italian beef sandwich shop. In the episode, the staff prepares to resume business in The Bear, with conflicts arising in the span of one month.

== Plot ==
Marcus (Lionel Boyce) and the staff attend his mother's funeral. He delivers a eulogy, where he relates how his mother was always there for him, and how her life influenced him. Afterwards, the team returns to the restaurant to start their duties. On the first day, they are surprised by the packed attendance, and it initially goes well with few problems. As the days pass, conflicts start arising, with some accidents occurring in the kitchen.

Through the following month, the conflicts escalate. Richie (Ebon Moss-Bachrach) angers Carmy (Jeremy Allen White) when he decides to make his own "non-negotiable" list to build a more relaxing environment. Cicero (Oliver Platt) is also upset when he learns that Carmy is buying expensive items, including $11,000 for an "Orwellian" butter. Sugar (Abby Elliott) also realizes that the restaurant is losing money despite booked reservations, as changing the menus gets them to waste food. In an attempt to try to recover some of the money, Sugar suggests adding a new turn at 9:30 p.m.,which the staff reluctantly accepts.

Carmy and Richie continue fighting with each other over different aspects, frustrating Sydney (Ayo Edebiri), who constantly needs to calm Carmy down. When Richie explains that a customer specifically requested no mushrooms in his meal, Carmy turns aggressive by wanting to place the mushrooms anyway. This leads to a physical altercation between them, which also leads to the restaurant's expo sheets flying off the table. As Sydney eyes a lost food ticket on the floor at the end of service, she wearily realizes the extent of the restaurant's dysfunction.

== Production ==
=== Development ===
In May 2024, Hulu confirmed that the third episode of the season would be titled "Doors", and was to be written by series creator Christopher Storer from a story he co-wrote with co-producer Will Guidara, and directed by co-producer Duccio Fabbri, the series' longtime first assistant director. It was Storer's tenth writing credit, Guidara's first writing credit, and Fabbri's first directing credit.

=== Writing ===
On Marcus' eulogy, Lionel Boyce commented, "I was like: a monologue. Alright, alright. But I think it felt reassuring. It's like jumping off a cliff, but he believes in me. He wouldn't have written it if he didn't think I could do it. The writers are trying to steer the ship in a certain direction, and they want this in there, so my job is to uphold that and do my best to deliver it as close as possible to the way they want it."

=== Filming ===
According to cinematographer Andrew Wehde, "We did this episode in probably three or four days, but we were shooting inserts for it for a long time—we would constantly be shooting bits and pieces here and there. It's the power of running two cameras. B-camera operator Chris Dame is the contributor to the B-roll behind our show, and he has done an incredible job of taking on that responsibility. Duccio [Fabbri] would be like, 'I need inserts of the dish pit,' and Chris would go in and grab it with the 11:1."

In March 2024, scenes depicting the cast filming a funeral leaked to the Internet, with fans speculating that they would attend Marcus' mother's funeral. Jeremy Allen White considered the leak "a bummer", commenting "It was very difficult to pretend that moment could have been something else that was photographed. We had to learn how to be a bit more careful, and I think our production acted accordingly."

=== Sound editing ===
According to supervising sound editor Steve Giammaria the episode begins at the funeral for Marcus' late mother, Angela Brooks, with a rather loud silence, which is unusual for the show. However, according to Giammaria, "There's a real depth to this quiet; there's a lot actually happening. There are layers of benches creaking and people coughing and all of this stuff to give it that feeling of being in a church at a funeral—something, unfortunately, that people are familiar with. So it's just sitting in that silence and that heaviness."

The head of The Bear's sound recording department, Scott D. Smith, wrote in 2025 that "Doors" was the "most problematic" episode of the otherwise relatively quiet season three, due to "frequent overlapping dialogue" combined with the noises resulting from "dishes stacked up in the sink, orders gone wrong, someone's hand being cut with a utility knife, shouting matches, and physical altercations."

=== Music ===
In a "departure from The Bear's typical soundtrack of Gen X alternative rock," this episode's music was classical, tone poems, and opera. The main action in the restaurant begins and concludes with music from La traviata (1853) by Italian composer Giuseppe Verdi.

== Reception ==
=== Critical reviews ===
Jenna Scherer of The A.V. Club gave the episode an "A–" grade and wrote, "One of The Bear's greatest strengths has always been its ability to make viewers internalize characters' emotions, and 'Doors' is a whirlwind of them. Over the course of half an hour, the episode takes us through a month at Chicago's hottest new restaurant, as Carmy and Sydney put their brigade de cuisine model into practice in a kitchen—one staffed by people who, less than a year ago, were working at a neighborhood sandwich dive."

Alan Sepinwall of Rolling Stone wrote, "'Doors', which chronicles a month in the life of The Bear, where Carmy's evolving menu, and the conflict between him and Richie, turn the restaurant increasingly messy in both a literal and emotional sense. It's a potent 1-2-3 punch to start off the season, as a reminder of just how many ways Storer and company have found to tell what would seem at first to be a pretty simple story of an interesting workplace."

Marah Eakin of Vulture gave the episode a 3 star out of 5 rating and wrote, "Every season, The Bear has at least one episode that sits at a rolling boil the whole time, makes your heart race and your anxiety pop, and leaves you feeling utterly exhausted. This year, that episode is 'Doors'."

A.J. Daulerio of Decider wrote, "The first hour's worth of orders goes eerily, uncomfortably smoothly. All the non-negotiables are clicking, and there have been exactly zero meltdowns so far. But we know better. At The Bear—chaos reigns." Brady Langmann of Esquire wrote, "If episode 1 was Carmy's fridge-enclosed vision quest and episode 2 was our reintroduction to the restaurant's crew, episode 3 is a reminder of why The Bear captivated us in the first place: the shock-horror-can't-look-away-from-the-car-crash feeling of watching shit go very, very wrong. With that in mind, 'Doors' is a vintage episode of The Bear. It's the first time we see the kitchen truly in full swing since the restaurant's disastrous opening in the season 2 finale."

Kevin Fallon of The Daily Beast described "Doors" as a self-conscious installment, for better or worse: "There's familiarity to the early episodes, which is to say ear-splitting, pulse-racing chaos. But the show seems to sense that such a harshness becoming familiar, when it was once so novel and groundbreaking, isn't a good thing—that it could even become a rut. Did I marvel at the editing, the choreography, and the pandemonium of Episode 3, 'Doors'? Yes. Did each time someone shouted, 'Doors!' amplify a growing headache as I watched? Immensely so."

=== Accolades ===
| Award | Category | Nominee(s) | Result | Ref. |
|---|---|---|---|---|
| Cinema Audio Society Awards | Outstanding Achievement in Sound Mixing for a Television Series – Half Hour | Scott D. Smith, Steve "Major" Giammaria, Patrick Christensen, Kendall Barron, Ryan Collison, and Connor Nagy | Won | |
| Directors Guild of America Awards | Outstanding Directorial Achievement in Comedy Series | Duccio Fabbri | Nominated | |
| Golden Reel Awards | Outstanding Achievement in Music Editing – Broadcast Short Form | Jason Lingle and Jeff Lingle | Nominated | |
| Golden Reel Awards | Outstanding Achievement in Sound Editing – Broadcast Short Form | Steve "Major" Giammaria, Jonathan Fuhrer, Matt Snedecor, Craig LoGiudice, John Bowen, Evan Benjamin, Annie Taylor, Leslie Bloome, and Shaun Brennan | Nominated | |
| Primetime Emmy Awards | Outstanding Supporting Actor in a Comedy Series | Ebon Moss-Bachrach | Nominated | |
| Primetime Creative Arts Emmy Awards | Outstanding Sound Editing for a Comedy or Drama Series (Half-Hour) | Steve "Major" Giammaria, Craig LoGiudice, Evan Benjamin, John Bowen, Jonathan Fuhrer, Matt Snedecor, Annie Taylor, Jeff Lingle, Jason Lingle, Leslie Bloome, and Shaun Brennan | Nominated | |
| Primetime Creative Arts Emmy Awards | Outstanding Sound Mixing for a Comedy or Drama Series (Half-Hour) and Animation | Scott D. Smith, Steve "Major" Giammaria, Patrick Christensen, and Ryan Collison | Nominated | |

== Sources ==
- Smith, Scott D. (Fall 2025). "The Bear: The Challenges of Managing Kitchen Chaos". Production Sound & Video. 17 (4). North Hollywood, California: IATSE 695: 32–37.
