= Forever (The Bear) =

- The Bear episode
- Episode no.: Season 3 Episode 10
- Directed by: Christopher Storer
- Written by: Christopher Storer
- Cinematography by: Andrew Wehde
- Editing by: Joanna Naugle
- Production code: XCBV3010
- Original air date: June 26, 2024
- Running time: 43 minutes

Guest appearances
- Olivia Colman as Chef Andrea Terry; Will Poulter as Chef Luca; Joel McHale as Chef David Fields; Molly Gordon as Claire Dunlap; Jon Bernthal as Michael Berzatto; Thomas Keller as himself; Ricky Staffieri as Theodore "Teddy" Fak; Adam Shapiro as Adam; Corey Hendrix as Gary "Sweeps" Woods; Sarah Ramos as Jessica; Andrew Lopez as Garrett; Rene Gube as Rene, Ever GM; Grant Achatz as himself; Will Guidara as himself; Christina Tosi as herself; Wylie Dufresne as himself; Kevin Boehm as himself; Anna Posey as herself; Rosio Sanchez as herself; Genie Kwon as herself; Malcolm Livingston II as himself

Episode chronology
| ← Previous "Apologies" | Next → "Groundhogs" |
- The Bear season 3

"Forever" is the tenth episode and season finale of the third season of the American comedy-drama television series The Bear. It is the 28th overall episode of the series and was written and directed by series creator Christopher Storer. It was released on Hulu on June 26, 2024, along with the rest of the season.

The series follows Carmen "Carmy" Berzatto, an award-winning New York City chef de cuisine, who returns to his hometown of Chicago to run his late brother Michael's failing Italian beef sandwich shop. In the episode, Carmy, Sydney and Richie attend a "funeral service" for the restaurant Ever, where they reunite with some chefs.

== Plot ==
In a flashback, Carmy (Jeremy Allen White) starts his first day at the French Laundry. As he is preparing family meal, he is approached by Chef Thomas Keller, who offers him some tips on trussing a chicken. Keller also explains that, besides learning how to cook, it is very important to "nurture" people in his environment to build a good image.

In present day, Carmy, Sydney (Ayo Edebiri) and Richie (Ebon Moss-Bachrach) arrive at Ever (a fictionalized version of a real restaurant in the West Loop) for its closing dinner. They reunite with a few colleagues, including Chef Luca (Will Poulter) and a few other respected chefs. As they sit to converse about their experiences, Carmy notices that Chef David Fields (Joel McHale) is in attendance. Richie goes to the kitchen, where he reunites with Garrett (Andrew Lopez) and Jessica (Sarah Ramos), and decides to help them in running service.

As the chefs talk about the importance of creating safe environments, Carmy finally admits his frustration with Fields to Sydney and Luca. When Fields walks to the bathroom, Carmy goes to confront him over his abusive nature. Carmy tells him he thinks about him which Fields states he does not think about him. Carmy opens up about how he destroyed his life by having abandoned other people in his life. Fields, however, retorts to an incredulous Carmy that he should be thankful; he began as a fine chef and left as an "excellent" chef. Sydney and Luca visit the kitchen, where Luca reveals he will stay in Chicago for a few months to visit his sister. Adam (Adam Shapiro) reminds Sydney about his prior offer, to which she states she is still interested.

Chef Terry (Olivia Colman) delivers a speech, proclaiming that the importance of a restaurant is not the food, but the service to the customers. She also explains her choice to close the restaurant to Carmy, explaining she was tired of the constant stress and wanted to finish her career on her own terms. Later, Sydney invites the staff of The Bear and Ever to her apartment for a party. Checking the fridge, Sydney finds a four-star review for The Beef, causing her to leave the apartment due to a panic attack.

Carmy walks alone past the old West Loop location of Peoria Packing Butcher Shop along the Green-Pink Line tracks, and discovers that he has missed phone calls from Cicero and Computer, as the Chicago Tribune review is finally out. He stares at a few specific words, but the consensus is not seen. Carmy simply proclaims, "Motherfucker." A title card placed at the end of the show states TO BE CONTINUED.

== Production ==
=== Development ===
In May 2024, Hulu confirmed that the tenth and final episode of the season would be titled "Forever", and was to be written and directed by series creator Christopher Storer. It was Storer's 14th writing credit and 19th directing credit.

=== Casting ===
The episode features numerous cameos by several real-life chefs portraying themselves, including Christina Tosi and Grant Achatz. Tosi became involved through her friendship with showrunner Storer, as well as her husband Will Guidara, who is a producer on the show and also cameos in the episode. Achatz was a fan of the show and was interested in being involved after earlier plans to film at Alinea fell through. The Achatz appearance was brokered by chef Dave Beran, who did the culinary and restaurant line training for Jeremy Allen White and Will Poulter; Achatz told Michelin.com: "Dave Beran (of Pasjoli) who was with me for 10 years flew into Chicago to be on-set with them and was speaking to the director. So Dave texted me and was like, 'Come down to set. They want to talk to you about possibly writing you in.'"

Alinea's green apple taffy helium balloon

Storer simply told Achatz that Will Poulter would ask him questions and he should respond naturally. Unbeknownst to Achatz, Poulter was instructed to ask a series of questions Storer knew Achatz was used to hearing and would find tedious, starting the cameras without telling him and capturing Achatz's genuine annoyed reaction.

=== Writing and filming ===
Jeremy Allen White filmed scenes at the French Laundry in Yountville, California, United States, during the last week of May 2024. Chef Thomas Keller talked to Carmy about making roast chicken, Keller's real-life favorite. According to The Bear cinematographer Andrew Wehde, "At the beginning of the episode, when Carmy's with Thomas Keller at the French Laundry, that was 50mm. [Camera operator Gary Malouf] was handheld, riding a butt-dolly so he could roll. The movement's beautiful. To brag about Gary, he's been with me forever, since eighth grade. He was nominated for a Society of Camera Operators award three years in a row for this show. He gets Steadicam operators who send him messages like, 'What's your rig?' And he's like, 'It's all handheld.' He's just that guy...Put the camera on your shoulder and move it."

Gillian Jacobs told The Hollywood Reporter how much she admired the acting choices of her former Community costar Joel McHale in the scene where Carmy confronts Chef Fields: "I can't stop thinking about his scene with Carmy in the last episode of the season. The restraint Joel uses, and to play that figure that has loomed so large in someone's imagination, and now they're having that conversation Carmy always imagined having. He probably pictured it four million times in the shower, on walks, and now it's happening in real life. You can see how it reminded him of what that dynamic gave him. It was like a fuel, although I don't know how healthy that fuel was." McHale told GQ of the Berzatto–Fields scene: "The fact that David's like, 'Hey, man, what are you so worried about? Unclutch your pearls. You shouldn't be so upset about all this stuff. You did it. You got there' is deeply unfair on David's part. He approves of him because it worked out. But there are probably so many chefs that didn't achieve the same thing. Obviously, Jeremy's character is extremely skilled, and has worked his ass off, but he's just like everybody in every profession—he had to have some luck. So the piles of other sous chefs and line cooks that worked for David who didn't make it? You forget about those people. So I think it's unfair, because he didn't have to be a dick, but he was, and that's how he is, and that's what worked for him."

Regarding the episode-and-season-concluding party at Sydney's tiny new apartment, Lionel Boyce told The Hollywood Reporter, "I had a lot of fun filming the party in the finale. We made that a real party environment. Even though we were still in the middle of filming, it felt like the last day of school. There was a relief and release. It was late at night, and it was very loose, and there was music playing. I didn't even know that song ['Laid' by James]. They told us, 'OK, yell out the song and everyone starts singing,' and I'm like, 'What is this song that everyone knows except me?'"

=== Music ===
Songs featured on the soundtrack of the episode include "Together" by Nine Inch Nails, "In the Garage" by Weezer, "The Big Country" by Talking Heads, "Joy" by The Sundays, "Within Your Reach" by The Replacements, "Can You Hear Me?" by David Bowie, "Diamond Diary" by Tangerine Dream, "Just One More Day" by Otis Redding, "We Close Our Eyes" by Susanna Hoffs, "Big White Cloud" by John Cale, "Laid" by James, and "Disarm" by The Smashing Pumpkins.

== Reception ==
=== Critical reviews ===
Jenna Scherer of The A.V. Club gave the episode a "B" grade and wrote, "Thus we arrive at 'Forever,' a season finale that feels like The Bear patting itself on the back, buzzed on its buzz, topped off with a non-ending that makes you want to throw your hands in the air. Storer's heavy-handed script hammers home themes that he already made crystal clear earlier in the season."

Alan Sepinwall of Rolling Stone wrote, "even though the finale often gets high on its own supply, it eventually circles back to Carmy and Sydney, whose story this is above all else, and reminds us that miracles do not tend to come cheap. Perhaps if Carmy had gone back to Ever rather than going to New York, he might have become a worthy successor to Andrea Terry."

Marah Eakin of Vulture gave the episode a 3 star out of 5 rating and wrote, "We'll have to wait until next season to find out, which could be The Bear's last if rumors are to be believed. And while I don't think season three of The Bear was its best, maybe it helps to think about it like that frozen pizza Chef Terry pulled out of Syd's freezer: Even at its worst, The Bear is still pretty damn good." A.J. Daulerio of Decider wrote, "And here we are. The end of a mostly uneventful, meandering season that left the ravenous Bear-loving public still waiting for it to officially begin at the exact moment it ended. Most of the episodes were muddled with flashbacks, pretentious camera tricks, and what appeared to be an overreliance on the actors to improvise through dead spots in scripts. Next season, there should be more substance (right?) and hopefully 95 percent less Fak."

Brady Langmann of Esquire wrote, "when Carmy's anxiety montages pop up, we're meant to understand that he's become an unreliable narrator. The review could've said anything—let's just hope it's not negative enough to make Uncle Jimmy pull his funding entirely."

A Food & Wine columnist commented about the use of real chefs in season 3 that the appearances in the finale (as opposed to the premiere, "Tomorrow") had "more meat to them...The [dinner] scene itself was mostly unscripted; the chefs naturally talked about the first dish they created for a restaurant menu, the impact of having a bad boss, and the joy of cooking. Every word added depth to the public perception of these real, ultra successful chefs who viewers may or may not recognize. And yet, I felt like the scene was far too long, swallowing up the entire episode..."

=== Accolades ===
| Award | Category | Nominee(s) | Result | Ref. |
|---|---|---|---|---|
| Primetime Creative Arts Emmy Awards | Outstanding Guest Actress in a Comedy Series | Olivia Colman | Nominated | |
