= The Bear season 5 =

Season of television series

The Bear
- Season 5
- Promotional poster
- Showrunner: Christopher Storer
- Starring: Jeremy Allen White; Ebon Moss-Bachrach; Ayo Edebiri; Lionel Boyce; Abby Elliott; Matty Matheson; Liza Colón-Zayas; Edwin Lee Gibson
- No. of episodes: 8

Release
- Original network: FX on Hulu
- Original release: June 25, 2026

Season chronology
- ← Previous; Season 4

The fifth and final season of the American comedy-drama television series The Bear premiered with all eight episodes on June 25, 2026, on FX on Hulu. Series creator Christopher Storer returns as showrunner for the season, and directs all but one episode. Jeremy Allen White reprises his role as Carmy Berzatto, an award-winning New York City chef de cuisine, who returns to his hometown of Chicago to run his deceased brother Michael's failing sandwich shop.

The majority of the season takes place over a single day, picking up the morning after the previous season's finale, in which Sydney, Richie and Natalie learn that Carmy has quit the food industry and left the restaurant to them. With no money, the threat of a sale and a torrential storm in their way, the new partners must band together with the rest of the team to achieve one last service, hoping to finally earn a Michelin star. The season features an original score composed by Christian Lundberg for Bleeding Fingers Music and produced by Hans Zimmer, eschewing the series' previous trend of using popular music for its soundtrack.

The season was met with critical acclaim, with reviewers praising it as a return to form for the series after the third and fourth seasons, and a satisfying conclusion for the series.

== Cast ==
=== Main ===
- Jeremy Allen White as Carmy Berzatto
- Ebon Moss-Bachrach as Richie Jerimovich
- Ayo Edebiri as Sydney Adamu
- Lionel Boyce as Marcus Brooks
- Abby Elliott as Natalie Berzatto
- Matty Matheson as Neil Fak
- Liza Colón-Zayas as Tina Marrero
- Edwin Lee Gibson as Ebraheim

=== Recurring ===
- Oliver Platt as Jimmy "Cicero" Kalinowski
- Jose Cervantes as Angel
- Richard Esteras as Manny
- Jamie Lee Curtis as Donna Berzatto
- Brian Koppelman as Uncle Computer
- Will Poulter as Luca
- Sarah Ramos as Jessica
- Ricky Staffieri as Theodore Fak
- Elsie Fisher as Terry "Cheese" Cheddario
- Rene Gube as Rene
- Corey Hendrix as Gary "Sweeps" Woods
- Paulie James as Chuckie
- Andrew Lopez as Garrett
- Christopher Zucchero as Chi-Chi
- Chris Witaske as Pete Katinsky

=== Guest ===
- David Zayas as David
- Carmen Christopher as Chester
- Deirdre O'Connell as Mary Heyman
- Brad Morris as Allan Mitchell
- Peter Grosz as Mr. Dearborn
- Harry Lennix as Mr. Brooks
- Tom Skilling as himself
- Jon Bernthal as Michael Berzatto
- Molly Gordon as Claire Dunlap
- Josh Hartnett as Frank
- Bonnie Hunt as Sue
- Gillian Jacobs as Tiffany "Tiff" Jerimovich
- Gary Janetti as Mr. Clark
- Mitra Jouhari as Kelly
- John Mulaney as Stevie
- Bob Odenkirk as "Uncle" Lee Lane
- Annabelle Toomey as Eva Jerimovich
- Robert Townsend as Emmanuel Adamu

== Episodes ==
No. overall	No. in season	Title	Directed by	Written by	Original release date	Prod. code
40	1	"Soda"	Christopher Storer	Christopher Storer	June 25, 2026	XCBV5001
The morning after Carmy tells Sydney, Richie and Natalie about his retirement from the food industry, a major storm hits Chicago. The Bear staff attempts to prepare for service despite nearly empty shelves, failing supplies, and faulty plumbing. Richie gets into a car accident while driving to work. Carmy arrives and asks Sydney to keep his resignation secret until he can tell the rest of the staff, and places her in charge of the kitchen. Cicero reveals he has lost most of his money and is selling the building; Richie promises he will help save the restaurant. Ebraheim notes that the restaurant's credit cards have stopped working. Natalie informs Sydney that expenses must be cut. Luca announces he is returning to Copenhagen, upsetting Marcus. As the staff struggles with worsening plumbing problems, a pipe suddenly bursts and floods the restaurant.
41	2	"Lamb"	Christopher Storer	Rene Gube & Karen Joseph Adcock	June 25, 2026	XCBV5002
The burst pipe causes the restaurant to flood; the staff cleans up and continues preparing for service, as they cannot afford to close for even one day. Sydney organizes the crew while Natalie negotiates with vendors, Marcus arranges for his estranged father to attend service, and Carmy's attempt to clear the drain worsens the flooding. Richie proposes a tax credit program to reduce expenses, but Cicero's inspection reveals extensive structural damage; he also admits cancelling the restaurant's wagyu order to save money. After learning the building may be unsellable due to its condition, Natalie confides her fears that her sacrifices have come at the expense of time with her daughter, and Tina reassures her. When an argument breaks out before service, Sydney restores order by outlining a plan, and the reservation system comes back online.
42	3	"Mint"	Christopher Storer	Karen Joseph Adcock	June 25, 2026	XCBV5003
Five hours before service, Natalie proposes shortening the menu and simplifying dishes to compensate for missing ingredients. The reservation system mistakenly books three full rounds of customers, dividing the staff over whether to honor every reservation. During a tense moment with Carmy, Sydney unintentionally reveals his resignation to the entire team. Carmy admits he no longer believes he should lead the restaurant, apologizes to the staff, and says he loves them. Neil informs Cicero, who berates Carmy over his decision. Carmy later encourages Sydney to stop seeking his approval and take control of the kitchen. After Sydney reorganizes the service plan and rallies the staff, Ted accidentally falls through the ceiling while attempting to repair the roof.
43	4	"Ribs"	Christopher Storer	Catherine Schetina	June 25, 2026	XCBV5004
Carmy and Richie discuss Carmy's decision to step away; Richie encourages him to learn to work alongside others instead of trying to control everything. Natalie warns Carmy that the restaurant is barely able to make payroll. Cicero, Computer, and Computer's niece Cheese set out to secure air rights for the building to keep the restaurant's finances afloat. Sydney has Richie cancel several reservations, but he is unable to bring himself to do so. Carmy realises that canned tuna can be used to create tonnato sauce for the lamb entree, allowing Sydney to revise the menu to compensate for their ingredient shortages. Richie rallies the staff before service and has everyone wear an old set of misprinted T-shirts from the Beef for solidarity. Just before the restaurant opens, Jess notices that a reservation possibly linked to a Michelin Guide inspector has been changed.
44	5	"Raspberries"	Duccio Fabbri	Rachel Wiggins	June 25, 2026	XCBV5005
As the rain delays every reservation and causes a brief power outage, Sydney and Jess reduce portion sizes and shorten each table's service to accommodate the expected backlog. Pete arrives at the restaurant and helps Cicero, Computer, and Cheese with their search for the building's air rights, but their meeting with the rights owner, Mary Heyman, goes sideways. Sydney tells Tina that she wants her to remain her chef de cuisine wherever they end up. Marcus becomes increasingly irritable toward Luca while insisting on obtaining raspberries before service for his father's dessert. Richie shares an intimate moment with Jess while trying to manage his anxiety. As the first customers finally arrive late, Sydney orders the kitchen to begin service.
45	6	"Focaccia"	Christopher Storer	Rene Gube	June 25, 2026	XCBV5006
As guests arrive, Sydney struggles to keep the kitchen organized while Richie improvises solutions to accommodate more customers, admitting he never canceled the extra reservations. Carmy creates an off-menu dish for waiting diners and gives guests a tour of the kitchen to free up tables. Outside, Natalie and Pete spontaneously have sex while Cicero prepares to sell a valuable watch, but Richie secretly prevents the sale from taking place. As the rain stops, Richie expands seating outdoors and even pays for customers' desserts at another restaurant to ease congestion. Tensions rise when Marcus argues with Luca who was forced to leave the pastry station to meet guests. Sydney reassures Marcus that he earned his success on his own, while Carmy later comforts Sydney after she becomes overwhelmed. Marcus and Luca reconcile before the staff regroups to prepare for the arrival of the presumed Michelin critic.
46	7	"Caramel"	Christopher Storer	Christopher Storer & Nicole Kohut	June 25, 2026	XCBV5007
As service continues, the staff works to seat every reservation within strict time limits while Donna arrives at the restaurant with Sophie. The apparent Michelin inspector, Mr. Dearborn, arrives with weatherman Tom Skilling; Richie manages to clear a table while Carmy enlists an overzealous guest touring the kitchen to help fold napkins to save time. Marcus's father arrives for dinner, while Neil keeps Dearborn and Skilling entertained with personal stories. The stove fails, forcing the staff to use hot plates to cook the lamb entree. Carmy accidentally drops Dearborn's plate; Sydney substitutes Tina's Brussels sprouts while Carmy suggests serving Sydney's Coca-Cola-braised short ribs, impressing Dearborn. Cicero and Computer agree to pursue Ebraheim's proposal to franchise the Beef window. Marcus and Luca serve Marcus's father dessert using raspberries and caramel sauce hidden inside a candle, deeply moving him. Carmy quickly improvises part of a replacement dessert to complete the final order. The staff successfully finishes service and celebrates.
47	8	"The Original Beef of Chicagoland"	Christopher Storer	Christopher Storer	June 25, 2026	XCBV5008
The morning after the restaurant's successful service, Natalie reveals that the restaurant has enough money to continue operating, though not to turn a profit, while Richie is invited to attend an international hospitality seminar in Japan. Cicero apologizes to Carmy and endorses Ebraheim's franchising proposal, which Carmy immediately approves. After Richie experiences a panic attack over traveling abroad, Carmy reassures him. Carmy receives a call from the actual Michelin Guide representative—Peter Clark, who dined at The Bear months prior—that the restaurant has earned two Michelin stars, and he shares the news with a stunned Sydney. Weeks later, Luca departs for Copenhagen and bids farewell to Marcus, while Ebraheim begins developing the franchise. Carmy interviews for an internship at an architectural firm and gets emotional when recounting what The Bear meant to him. The Bear staff and their loved ones celebrate the birthday of Richie's daughter Eva at the restaurant. Richie leaves for Japan with Jess, the two now in a relationship.

== Production ==
=== Development ===
In July 2025, the series was renewed for a fifth season. In May 2026, it was confirmed to be the final season.

=== Writing ===
Credited writers for season 5 include Christopher Storer, Rene Gube, Karen Joseph Adcock, Catherine Schetina, Rachel Wiggins, and Nicole Kohut. Seven of the eight episodes cover the events of just one day.

=== Costuming ===
Carmy's "iconic Gael Jacket...arguably the piece that turned The Bear into the menswear phenomenon that it became" makes a final appearance. Richie returns to his "Chicago tracksuit" roots. For his first international flight, he wears an Adidas Firebird jacket, a "staple" design since the late 1980s. Sydney's rainy-day trench coat is Maison Margiela's "Peached Coat," which retails for £2,150.

=== Filming ===
Principal photography was set to begin on January 5, 2026. Filming locations reportedly included Ukrainian Village, and the Green Door Tavern adjacent to Mr. Beef. Filming wrapped by March 28.

Cinematographer Andrew Wehde, who has filmed every episode except the original pilot, told Gold Derby about shooting seasons 1 through 4, "I always feel like if its color looks the same and it's being lensed the same way with the same camera, I can kind of do anything I want outside of that. Season 5 changes a little bit from there. So we do things differently, and that's our first big change."

During an interview about "Gary", Ebon Moss-Bachrach told USA Today, "I found making season 5 to be a really glorious experience. It felt like a real kind of magnum opus for the whole show...Hopefully [I'm] not tempting fate, I'm really, really proud of it. It's not easy to end something, and I think we went about it in a bold, bold way."

=== Music ===
Christian Lundberg of Bleeding Fingers Music replaced regular composers Jeffrey Qaiyum and Johnny Iguana for this season. Hans Zimmer, founder of Bleeding Fingers Music, produced the soundtrack. Lundberg told the Go See Talk film podcast about composing the season 5 score, "They started sending episodes about a month out to completion, and there's eight episodes, from 22 minutes to an hour. And I thought it was gonna be six to eight minutes an episode. I just had to go fast, and no doubts, because if you start doubting yourself you're gonna get stuck...At a certain point, [the episodes] got to be 80 percent score almost, which I did not expect that at all."

== Release ==
The season was preceded by the special episode "Gary", which was released without an advance marketing campaign on May 5, 2026. The following day, FX and Hulu jointly announced that the final season would premiere with all eight episodes on June 25, 2026, on Hulu, as well as internationally on Disney+. A weekly broadcast on FX would also begin on the same day with two episodes, followed by one episode weekly thereafter. The season also marks the first returning FX on Hulu series to receive a simultaneous release on both Hulu and the linear FX channel following a change in the latter's programming release strategy.

== Reception ==
On Rotten Tomatoes, 97% of 77 critics gave the fifth season a positive review, with an average of rated reviews of 8.2/10. The website's critics consensus reads, "The Bear closes out its final season with the character-driven finesse that it started with, ensuring its story and fans are served the finest of televisual meals without diminished returns." Metacritic assigned it a weighted average score of 82 out of 100 based on 28 reviews, signifying "universal acclaim" reviews.
