= Napkins (The Bear) =

- The Bear episode
- Episode no.: Season 3 Episode 6
- Directed by: Ayo Edebiri
- Written by: Catherine Schetina
- Cinematography by: Andrew Wehde
- Editing by: Joanna Naugle
- Production code: XCBV3006
- Original air date: June 26, 2024
- Running time: 34 minutes

Guest appearances
- David Zayas as David; Edwin Lee Gibson as Ebraheim; Jon Bernthal as Michael Berzatto; Christopher J. Zucchero as Chi-Chi; Paulie James as Chuckie; Jazmin Corona as Alma, Tina's work friend; Miguel Lepe Jr. as shift manager; Ben Kass as "hatchet man"; Sophie Ackerman as store clerk; Calvin Evans as MLM pitch man; Ayssette Muñoz as HR manager; Collin Quinn Rice as clothing store manager; Laura Nelson as realty office manager; Eddie Heffernan as young man; Otis Fine as co-worker

Episode chronology
← Previous "Children"	Next → "Legacy"
- The Bear season 3

"Napkins" is the sixth episode of the third season of the American television comedy-drama The Bear. It is the 24th overall episode of the series and was written by Catherine Schetina and directed by main cast member Ayo Edebiri. It was released on Hulu on June 26, 2024, along with the rest of the season.

The series follows Carmen "Carmy" Berzatto, an award-winning New York City chef de cuisine, who returns to his hometown of Chicago to run his late brother Michael's failing Italian beef sandwich shop. In the episode, Tina's past is explored. This is the first episode where Jeremy Allen White does not appear, although he is still credited. The episode received critical acclaim, with many critics later regarding it as one of the series' best.

== Plot ==
The action of "Napkins" begins when Tina Marrero (Liza Colón-Zayas) is laid off on November 9, 2018. Tina lives with her husband David (David Zayas) and son Louie, while working at an office. Her company announces layoffs, and Tina is dismissed from her job. While David is still employed at a different job, she still wants to find a job as they are struggling with debts.

Tina visits many locations in Chicago, but all turn her down. Tina continues using her handwritten résumé, but the employers now ask her to submit it through LinkedIn. Some reject her as she does not have a Bachelor of Arts degree, while some prefer hiring younger employees for different positions. Dejected, she makes a stop at the Beef and orders a coffee. Richie (Ebon Moss-Bachrach) gives her the coffee on the house, along with an Italian beef sandwich. She goes to the adjacent room to eat; as Fak (Matty Matheson) plays on an arcade game, Tina starts crying after tasting the sandwich.

Seeing her cry, Mikey (Jon Bernthal) sits down and offers a sympathetic ear. They talk over their struggles with the world, with Mikey explaining all the insufficient resources for the restaurant. He talks about Carmy, expressing jealousy that he could never achieve what his brother has made, yet pride in him for going so far. Tina expresses her own jealousy for the younger people that applied for her jobs, but also admits feeling admiration as they had more freedom. He offers her a line cook job at the restaurant, providing her with a Beef T-shirt, which she reveals as she arrives home.

== Production ==
=== Development ===
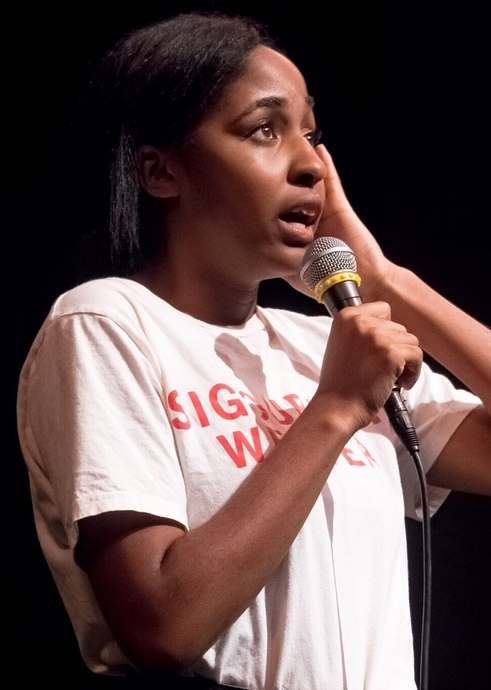
The episode marked Ayo Edebiri's directorial debut

In May 2024, Hulu confirmed that the sixth episode of the season would be titled "Napkins", and was to be written by Catherine Schetina and directed by main castmember Ayo Edebiri. It was Schetina's third writing credit and Edebiri's first directing credit. Edebiri was confirmed to make her directorial debut in March 2024. Series costar Lionel Boyce described the episode as a keystone of the season, commenting, "[Tina] felt her world was ending, and there's this sliver of hope in this dark place. We've all had that feeling of being at a crossroads, you're lost, wondering what am I going to do? And then you find something unexpected."

=== Set decoration ===
Colón-Zayas shared her ideas about the look of Tina's apartment with Edebiri, saying, "For me, it was important having the whole pride of being Puerto Rican. So a vejigante, the flag, Roberto Clemente. And cleanliness. It doesn't have to be OCD, but it couldn't be chaos. That was important to me. I feel like so often in stories that are not told by us, there's crosses everywhere."

=== Production design ===
Diego Garcia, who designed the Ballbreaker animations for season 1, returned to make new material for this flashback episode, including new game over screens.

=== Filming ===
While filming the second season, series creator Christopher Storer approached Edebiri over an opportunity to direct an episode in the third season. She said that as they stared at the scripts, "'Napkins' was the one that we both said, and I was just like, 'I would chew off my right arm in front of you if I could direct it. Because that would be a dream.'" To prepare, she joined the Directors Guild of America and took a few courses. She said, "It was really a blast and an honor to get to helm an episode that showcases everything that Liza can do." Colón-Zayas commented, "Since day one, my girl is confident. Because she's smart, and she's curious, and she prepares. And we've had two years of working together, so there's already a bond and respect. It was so easy. I knew she was ready, but it was like she had been doing this forever. It was very gentle, very easy." According to cinematographer Andrew Wehde, "[Ayo] wanted to move the camera a lot. She wanted to make something that felt special on her own. And you can see it. You can really see how this episode stands out. I love when Tina goes into the restaurant for the first time, and it immediately transports you back to season 1, the way the zooms are flying in, and the camera's flying around the place, and everyone's screaming. That was so fun."

=== Editing ===
Film editor Joanna Naugle told an industry journal about "Napkins" that "We establish how [Tina's] so efficient, how it's important that she arrives at the exact right time, and she keeps checking the clock. When her world spirals out of control, we break our established rhythms. There's a sense of disarray, and to translate this, we were cutting so that things maybe are not falling quite on the beat. That's happening in the picture editing. Once we get to mix, we talk with Major [sound editor and re-recording mixer Steve 'Major' Giammaria] about what we're going for. And he has a million ideas about using different sound effects to reflect her state of mind and enhance what we're trying to show."

== Reception ==
=== Critical reviews ===
Jenna Scherer of The A.V. Club gave the episode an "A–" grade and wrote, "Not only is 'Napkins' a much-deserved showcase for the fantastic Liza Colón-Zayas, it also marks the directorial debut of Ayo Edebiri, who began her screen career as a writer before stepping in front of the camera. Unsurprisingly, she's just as adept in the director's chair as she is everywhere else: As 'Napkins' traces our heroine's progress through a bleak Chicago winter, Edebiri paints a precisely observed portrait of a middle-aged woman of color fighting tooth and nail to be seen in a world that would just as soon look straight through her."

Alan Sepinwall of Rolling Stone wrote, "This year's sixth episode, 'Napkins,' not only gives Colón-Zayas her first solo spotlight, but finally fills in this emotional blank. And in the process, it gives us the single best Bear scene of Season Three." Marah Eakin of Vulture gave the episode a 4 star out of 5 rating and wrote, "As a Bear character, Tina has never really gotten enough shine. We know she's been there since Mikey and she's developed dreams of becoming a chef, but we know little else about where she goes when she's not working. Or, rather, we knew little else because 'Napkins' opens the door wide into Tina's life, apartment, marriage, and past, giving us a glimpse at how she landed at the Bear."

Fletcher Peters of The Daily Beast wrote, "The episode is a tour-de-force, a relatable look into the endless, exhausting days of finding a job. By the end of the episode, a completely deflated Tina sobs into an Italian beef sub while Richie and Michael argue over a video game in the background, signaling a transition in her life out of the blues of unemployment and into the frenetic energy of the restaurant industry. Edebiri's directorial vision shines through in this moment, in which she finds a way to explode two chaotic moments in one frame." A.J. Daulerio of Decider wrote, "She was sent to culinary school and elevated from a person who stirs giant pots of beef slop, staying quiet even in the most high-pressured fuck-you-fuck-off meltdowns between the usual front of the kitchen staff, to Sydney's sous chef. But she's never had her main-character moment until The Bear season 3 episode 6, 'Napkins,' directed by Ayo Edebiri. This is one of those quiet episodes—a welcome and merciful downshift from the disjointed, Fak-heavy plot lines that have clogged up season 3."

Josh Rosenberg of Esquire wrote, "Last episode, we talked about all the money the restaurant wasted in its first month of service—and goofed off with a new Fak brother! Turns out episode 6, 'Napkins,' has a grander vision than the everyday struggles of The Bear."

=== Accolades ===
Award	Category	Nominee(s)	Result	Ref.
Astra TV Awards	Best Directing in a Comedy Series	Ayo Edebiri	Nominated	
Astra TV Awards	Best Writing in a Comedy Series	Catherine Schetina and Christopher Storer	Nominated	
Black Reel TV Awards	Outstanding Directing in a Comedy Series	Ayo Edebiri	Won	
Directors Guild of America Awards	Outstanding Directorial Achievement in Comedy Series	Ayo Edebiri	Nominated	
NAACP Image Awards	Outstanding Directing in a Comedy Series	Ayo Edebiri	Nominated	
Primetime Emmy Awards	Outstanding Directing for a Comedy Series	Ayo Edebiri	Nominated	
Primetime Emmy Awards	Outstanding Supporting Actress in a Comedy Series	Liza Colón-Zayas	Nominated	
Primetime Creative Arts Emmy Awards	Outstanding Guest Actor in a Comedy Series	Jon Bernthal	Nominated	
Writers Guild of America Awards	Episodic Comedy	Catherine Schetina	Nominated	

== Sources ==
- Nikolova, Zlatina (July 2025). "'Every second counts': Urban affect and culinary chaos in The Bear". The Journal of Popular Television. 13 (1): 43–59. doi:10.1386/jptv_00135_1. ISSN 2046-9861.
