= Family on The Bear =

FX/Hulu series (2022–2026)

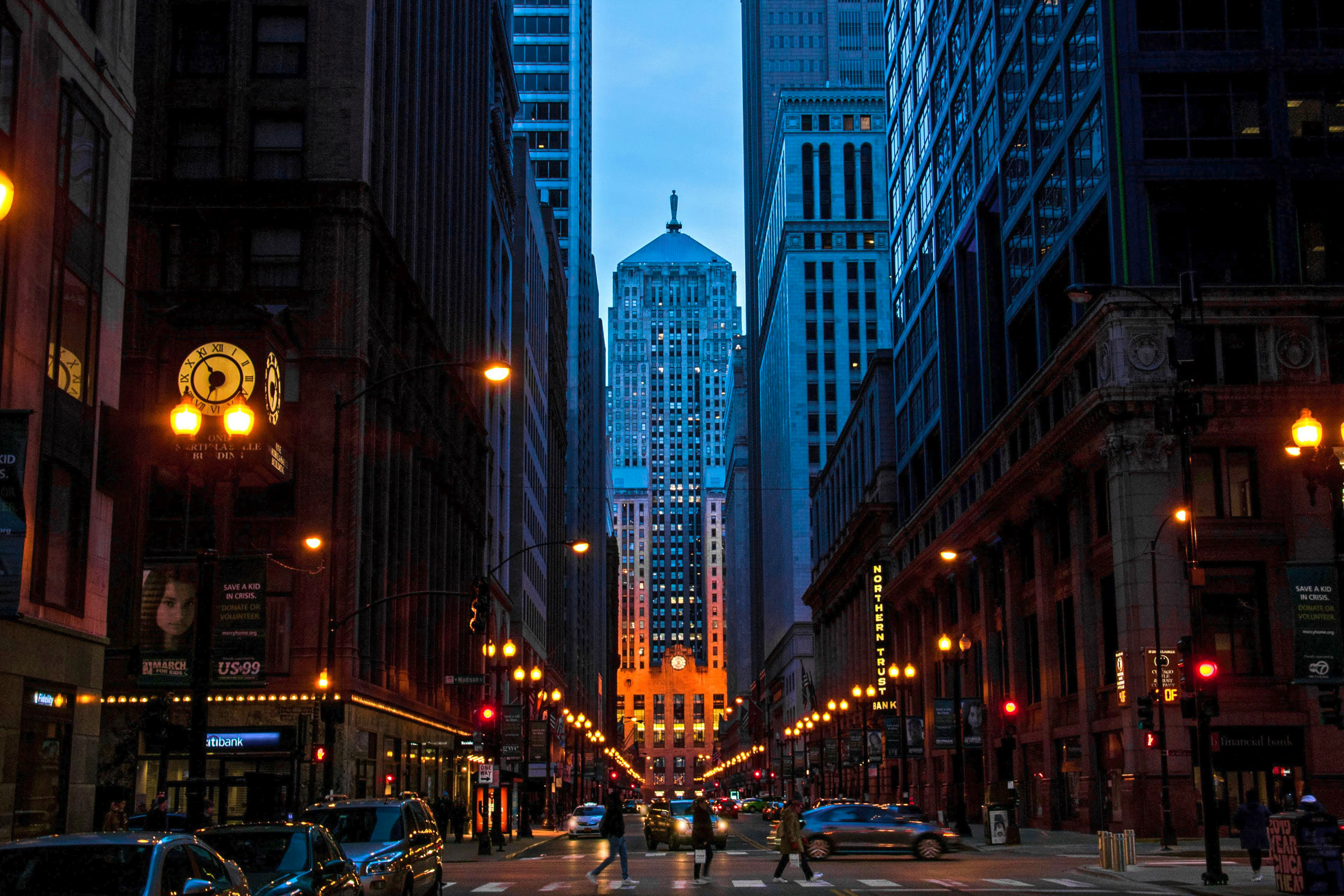
Ceres by sculptor John Storrs looks to the north, up LaSalle Street, from atop Holabird & Root's 1930 Board of Trade Building, an important example of the Art Deco style in Illinois; Mikey (Jon Bernthal) mentions this statue in the first Berzatto family flashback

Family dynamics and chosen family are major themes of the series The Bear, a 2022–2026 American television show, since main character Carmy Berzatto (Jeremy Allen White) returns to Chicago generally disgusted by the alcoholism (mom Donna) and abandonment (dad) that forged his "dysfunctional nightmare" of a nuclear family. Over time Carmy begins connecting with the employees of the Beef and the Bear in a way that replicates healthy familial attachments. The series examines, variously, the intergenerational trauma that haunts the restaurant, how family businesses benefit from the emotional investment encouraged by nurturing relationships but also historically transfer wealth primarily to members of the nuclear family, and how relationships with non-blood kin can be positively reinforced through both food and revenue sharing.

== Families and relationships ==
The Bear "quite overtly characterizes [Carmy] as a fatherly figure" but both Pop and Mikey were inadequate role models, leaving him somewhat bewildered by the demands of his unexpected role as "father replacement for the orphaned kitchen staff." Carmy Berzatto has drawn comparison to other Italian-American protagonists, including Mario Puzo and Francis Ford Coppola's Michael Corleone (Al Pacino) and David Chase's Tony Soprano (James Gandolfini). In 2022, The Indian Express wrote that "in its own weird way, The Bear is a lot like The Godfather. It's about family, but more specifically, it's about a family that has been threatened by tension, trauma, and tragedy. Carmy is guilty, like Michael Corleone, [of] essentially abandoning his folks and trying to make it on his own. He wanted nothing to do with the family business...But with his brother now gone, he has no choice but to step up, and, wherever possible, make amends for the wrongs that he may have done." A 2025 article in the journal Diasporic Italy argued that "Tony Soprano's ambivalence, if not his occasional declarations of plain inadequacy at his parental role, ostensibly pave the way for the more honest depiction of what Italian American fatherhood looks like on the small screen after 2000...[The Bear] epitomiz[es] this specific shift in the fictional representation of fatherhood[.]"

As a Vulture writer put it in 2025, "If The Bear is about only one thing, it's family. Sure, it's about food and jokes and arguing and money and past trauma, but all of those things can be wrapped up into one big familial package. Carmy came back to take over his late brother's restaurant because of family. Richie (Ebon Moss-Bachrach) and the Faks aren't technically related to Carmy and Nat (Abby Elliott) but they're family all the same. Tina's (Liza Colón-Zayas) motherly and Ebra's (Edwin Lee Gibson) a bit of a kooky uncle. Remember: The reason the shiny new Bear exists at all is because of Mikey's (Jon Bernthal) 'family dinner' recipe that urged Carmy to open up the smaller cans of tomatoes. Everyone working—or even dining—at the Bear is family, whether they like it or not." NPR critic-at-large Eric Deggans wrote of the final season, "Turns out, with apologies to The Fast and the Furious, The Bear really was all about family—learning to accept and cope with the crazy people you're connected to by blood, occupation and otherwise—evolving yourself and how you handle them to build a mighty coalition that makes you better, every day."

Carmy initially resisted Mikey's family-meal spaghetti, deeming it an underseasoned, oversauced mess, but later relented, which an anthropological examination of Italian-American food rituals suggested may be critical to the formation of the family: "Enjoying the 'taste' of the authentic sacred dishes is, therefore, a sign of cultural competence—of becoming fully integrated as an authentic group member." It is a truism of the series that "someone doesn't necessarily have to be a Berzatto to be a Bear."

The Berzattos are the show's center of gravity: "The Berzattos are a difficult clan to belong to but magnetic nonetheless. Lifelong friends and ex-in-laws alike linger in their orbit, forming an amorphous, unofficial family that mystifies outsiders." A review of season 3 said much the same: "There is something inherently magnetic about the Berzatto family; if people were rooms in a home, the Berzattos would be the dining room, a place where families congregate, whether linked by blood or other ties. The Berzattos and their compatriots inspire a certain sense of loyalty reminiscent of the notion that 'They are idiots, but they are my idiots.'" But the chosen family "redeems Carmy" and are established as his salvation if he is to have one: "He bangs away at a door that won't let him out, cursing maniacally as the people he prepared to navigate disorder do precisely that, ignoring him while successfully executing his vision entirely from a place of love."

The show continuously explores how "kinship connections are created in the context of restaurant work. Drawing on the burgeoning of kinship studies in the 1990s [scholarship has] showed the way that families do not simply 'eat together', but eating together in a real (not 'fictive') sense can create family ties...Now this can presumably happen in many work situations, and has been the theme of many TV shows...Indeed, the premise of many shows that are not about traditional genealogical families is that the people in them, nevertheless, become family by spending time together (anything from Cheers to Parks and Rec or even The Office). Food is a little different, adding another dimension to the notion of work families becoming families." According to one food anthropologist, as of "Bears" Sydney (Ayo Edebiri) was responding to Donna's suggestion that she and Carmy were "very close" with a "hesitant 'I think so' and a laugh," but by the conclusion of "Goodbye," Sydney is "now fully incorporated into the Berzatto (Bear) family. As a streaming series, The Bear continues to provide meaningful material for reflection on the relationship of commodification and the market to meaningful lived experience and personal and family relationships to 'business', an enduring theme in Italian American popular representations and beyond." One columnist for a British religion magazine, Premier Christianity, cited a Bible verse from the New Testament that cautions against using profanity (Colossians 3:8) before going on to recommend the famously profane series as a practical model of family and community construction, suggesting that the non-judgmental hospitality of the main characters is not unlike that of the early Christians, as described in the New Testament book Acts of the Apostles.

Families usually start and are maintained with some combination of love, marriage, and sex, but The Bear "fails to delve into the commonplace back-of-house hookup culture in most restaurants." Cosmopolitan found it "shocking how both sex and relationship-averse the entire series had become by the end. Only four couples made it out at the end—two new (Richie and Jessica & Uncle Jimmy and Donna) and two pre-established (Sugar and Pete & Tina and David)—with very little done or shown between them...Unlike The Pitt, the issue with The Bear is that it gave fans these expectations in the first place." Yet neither is it crystal clear what comes after, wrote The Independent critic: "...the show's fanbase seems to have wildly divergent expectations about what, exactly, is the endgame, down to something as fundamental as whether Carmy and Syd are being set up as eventual love interests. The ships are at sea."

== Fathers and daddy issues ==
The father of the Berzatto children has been absent from the family for many years, probably since the 1990s, and thus he has been classed as a "paternity-free man, namely an unattached man who is in flight from his family, fails to include his children in his life project, and does not care to take responsibility for them." The Berzatto dad's first name is unknown and his fate is ambiguous; viewers speculate about whether or not he is alive or dead. Carmy's dad abandoned him when he was quite young, leaving him to be nurtured by an array of "uncles," and siblings Sugar and the much-older Mikey, and cousins (Richie, Michelle, etc.) to whatever extent they were capable. In season 4, Carmy told Marcus (Lionel Boyce), who was also raised by a single mom, that he "used to" wonder about his dad but not anymore. In "Napkins," Mikey told Tina about the Original Beef, "My old man, he opened it. He also ran it into the ground. He had a giant stack of unpaid bills. He took one look and he split, you know? He hightailed it. Ran for the hills, never came back." Carmy remembers that his dad always unhappy, and does not remember the last time he talked to him.

Moss-Bachrach and Bernthal co-wrote the special "Gary," which culminates in a Mikey viciously attacking his best friend Richie's character. Richie's wife is imminently due to deliver their first baby. Moss-Bachrach told Decider that Mikey's long-absent father is one of the unnamed issues driving the scene, which mirrors a screaming match that Carmy and Richie had in the season 2 finale: "You know, Mike's talking about fatherhood in that moment and about Richie's ability as a father. [...] we know the whole neighborhood that The Bear takes place in, except for one. There's this one black box, and that's their father, you know? We don't know much about him at all, but you can imagine."

=== "Pop" Berzatto ===
The biography of the missing father is vague, understood only from a handful of incidental disclosures. Jimmy Kalinowski (Oliver Platt) and "Pop" were once best friends. Jimmy last spoke to Mr. Berzatto "about 20 years ago" (from 2022) when they had a "gnarly fight...about a million things." According to Jimmy (Oliver Platt), Mr. Berzatto drank, did drugs, gambled, could not pick a career, and launched the Original Beef of Chicagoland restaurant on a whim after a visit to Ed Debevic's, a heavily marketed family-oriented diner that opened in River North in 1984. Pop Berzatto lived in the house in the suburbs for at least some time because in "Fishes" Mikey attests to Lee (Bob Odenkirk), "Hey, look, here's the thing. You see, I can throw forks 'cause this is our father's house. My father's house." Pop was a gun owner and one of his guns remained in the house. In "Groundhogs," Mikey discouraged Carmy from reflecting on their dad because he was an unavailable asshole. They discussed how "Pop" spent a fair amount of time at a "shithole" Irish bar called Kerrigan's that, in Mikey's telling, "smelled like a dumpster. It was fսcking hell." According to Donna in "Ice Chips" and "Tonnato," she and her husband argued frequently. Pop asked for a sedative to relieve his anxiety while Donna was in labor with Carmy. In "Gary," Richie asked Mikey to check how he looked before he went into a bar, and Mikey said "You look like a barbarian, you look like my father," before wiping a smear of cocaine powder off Richie's nostrils.

=== Syd's dad ===
Sydney's dad Emmanuel Adamu (Robert Townsend), meanwhile, only intersects with the main narrative twice, in the season 2 finale, and when his heart block pulls Sydney out of the restaurant to care for him, but has been described as "a serious candidate for Father of the Year: supportive, available, cautious, and proud of his child...Emmanuel raised his daughter almost by himself and still did a great job, as Sydney is a young woman who's well aware of who she is and her place in the world. He may seem a little too worried about her, especially the trust she puts in Carmy, but he supports whatever path she decides to take."

== Intergenerational trauma ==
The chaotic history of the Berzatto family, including an absent father, an inept alcoholic mother, and a drug-addicted older brother (whose suicide is the narrative's inciting event) haunts both Carmy and his de facto foster brother Richie, and by extension, the restaurant. As a doctor of palliative medicine wrote in 2026:

Carmy is competent, brilliant, and respected—and profoundly unwell...The Bear also gestures toward healing, offering moments of relief in the form of brief connections—shared meals, acts of mentorship, and moments of silence. Grief does not disappear, but it does become more tolerable when witnessed...often there is no tangible coping solution, no fix. Instead, there is something better—tools of palliation and alleviation of suffering in the form of humble recognition, silent companionship, and small acts of service.

At the end of the episode "Hands," Carmy decides to join Al-Anon. Al-Anon is not Alcoholics Anonymous but a related 12-step program for family members who have been affected by a relative's addiction. As one article about substance abuse and the Berzattos put it, "In Al-Anon, it's usually a parent or child who drove you into the rooms, whose own addiction was severe enough to alter your behavior into something equally unmanageable. Many of the patterns of growing up in an alcoholic, dysfunctional household on constant display in The Bear are pretty typical. In addition to the continuous rage circling Carmy like a red fog any time he puts on a white chef's coat, there are also more subtle showcases of the family disease inside him: Self-sabotage. Insecurity. Hypersensitivity. And then there's the grief...most of the Al-Anon members I interact with have grief in their bones."

In "Legacy," Nat is listening to an audiobook about how kids in dysfunctional families often play one of five roles in the dynamic: Enabler, Hero, Scapegoat, Mascot, and Lost Child. Carmy was the lost child, surely, fated to return as the adult prodigal. Did only daughter Natalie play the role of enabler? Was Mikey the hero, the scapegoat, or other? Was Richie an enabler or a mascot? Opinions vary.

== Mentorship and paternalism ==
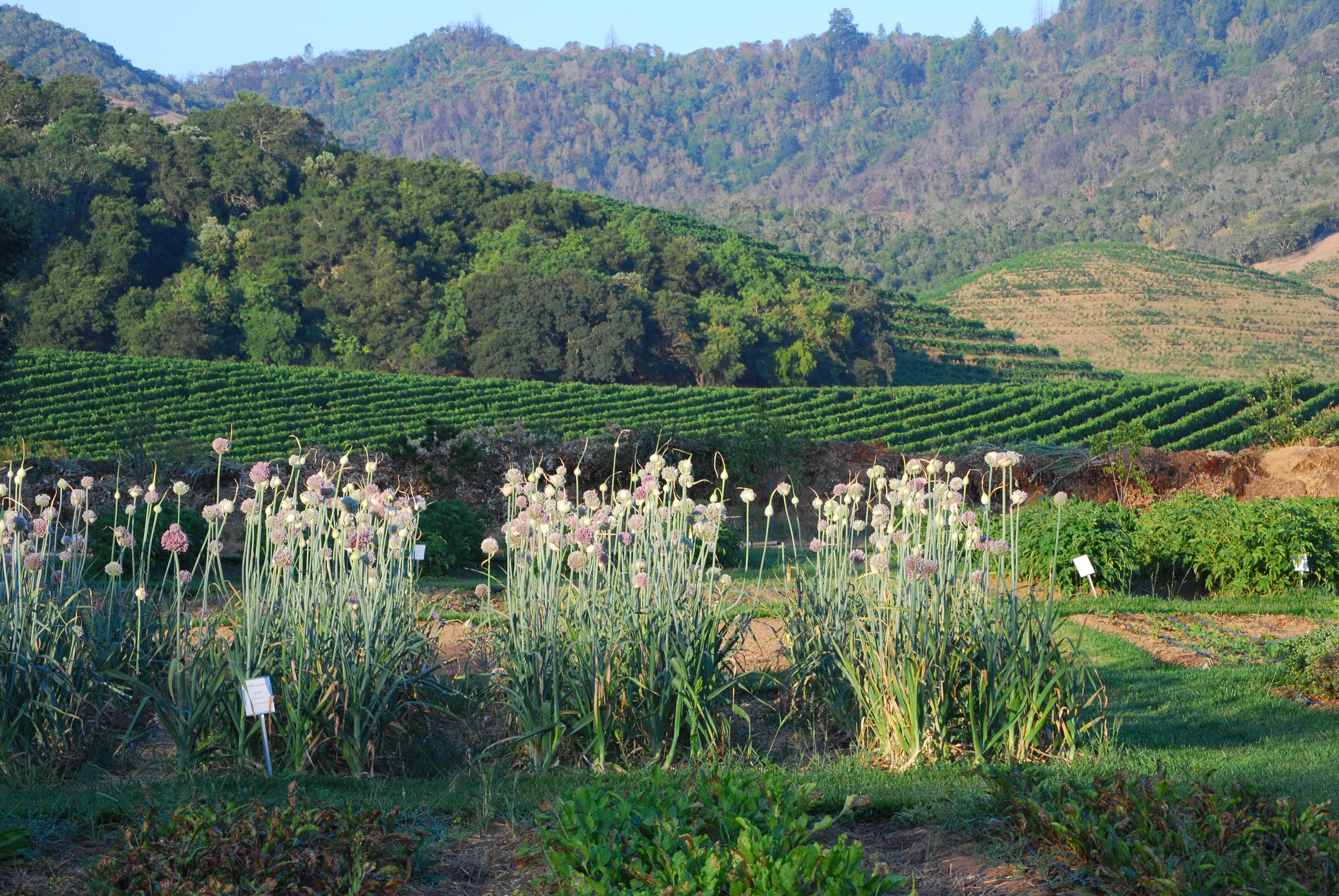
Flowering leeks in the kitchen garden of the French Laundry in the California Wine Country

One analysis of season 3 argued that especially in episodes like "Legacy" and "Forever" the show constructs Thomas Keller of the French Laundry and Per Se as a sort of meta father of modern American haute cuisine, drawing on Chris Storer's experience directing a Keller documentary called Sense of Urgency (2013). The father-son dynamic in the "Forever" flashback is reinforced by Keller's mention of his teacher before him, Roland Henin. The kitchens of Daniel, French Laundry, and Noma are visually distinguished in "Tomorrow" in part by their respective "iconic" toques blanches, blue aprons, and black T-shirts with gray aprons. Carmy chooses to outfit the Beef staff with blue aprons in season 1. A newspaper food critic who ate at Noma's Los Angeles residency, post-Redzepi abuse exposé, described the repast as expensive, superficially impressive, and the product of a "happy, self-satisfied cult" in gray aprons. Keller specifically tells Carmy, "We cook to nurture people," which "extends beyond providing food to signify fostering growth, development, and well‑being within a supportive context. This nurturing is not only professional but also social: the characters constantly address one another with familial terms, such as 'cousin', signaling a family‑like bond that can be confusing to newcomers or viewers but also reinforces trust, loyalty, and emotional support within the kitchen...in times of crisis and to facilitate their future growth." Season 3 examines "legacy," which is meant to describe "the transmission of knowledge, skills, and values from one generation of chefs to the next within the professional kitchen."

== Class and gentrification ==
The family-owned restaurant as a source of various types of sustenance for the working class is central to the value of The Bear as a piece of media, wrote chef Daniel Patterson after season 1 premiered in 2022.

As fucked up as they are, restaurants have historically been a place where people from every background can support themselves and even own their own business. My first-gen Greek roommate when I was 20 was able to attend college because his parents opened a diner when they arrived here, worked hard, and used their savings to make sure their kids had a better life. Over 50 years later that diner's still in business. The country is full of those kinds of stories.

One such case may be when, at the end of season one, Tina dragged her misbehaving teenage son Louie (Sebastian Merlo) into the restaurant by the scruff of his neck and dropped him at Carmy and Sydney's feet, insisting that they do something with him: "You taught me, you can teach him." According to the Cato Institute in 2023, "the U.S. food service industry has long been both a major entry point for non-college workers and [is] among the industries in which 'people gain the skills that enable them to climb the ladder in those sectors.' The industry also features a disproportionate share of minorities, women, immigrants, and ex-cons—many of whom also work their way up to leadership roles." A Francophone academic, who expressed mild boredom at having to frequently address The Bear in the context of his food sociology studies, concluded one essay about how class, race, and gender issues weigh on high cuisine by paraphrasing Brillat-Savarin: "Dis-moi qui te fait à manger, je te dirai qui tu es." ("Tell me who makes your food, I will tell you who you are.")

== Berzatto tree ==
Berzatto family tree (speculative dates and relationships marked with *)

Berzatto	Nonna?*
Berzatto	Gina?* (d.)
Berzatto "Pop"	Donna "Aunt DD"	Berzatto*	Berzatto*
Michael Berzatto (1979–2022) "Mikey"	Natalie Rose Berzatto (b. 1988) "Sugar"	Pete Katinsky	Carmen Anthony Berzatto (b. c. 1993)* "Bear"	Michelle Berzatto	Stevie	Spooky
Sophie Katinsky (b. 2023)

== See also ==
- Food of The Bear
- Music of The Bear
- List of The Bear episodes
- List of The Bear characters

== Sources ==
- Di Giovine, Michael A. (November 2010). "La Vigilia Italo-Americana: Revitalizing the Italian-American Family Through the Christmas Eve "Feast of the Seven Fishes"". Food and Foodways. 18 (4): 181–208. doi:10.1080/07409710.2010.529012. ISSN 0740-9710.
- Di Maio, Cristina (2025). "New Italian American Fathering in the Time of the Gig Economy: The Case of The Bear". Diasporic Italy Journal of the Italian American Studies Association. 5. University of Illinois Press: 105–121. doi:10.5406/27697738.05.1.08. ISSN 2769-772X.
- Martynuska, Małgorzata (February 2026). "'Every Second Counts': Representing Chicago's Urban Identity in the TV Series The Bear". Perspektywy Kultury. 53 (2). Kraków: Ignatianum University in Cracow: 75–91. ISSN 2081-1446.
- Muthumanickam, Aruna (February 17, 2026). "The Bear". Journal of Palliative Medicine. 29 (8) 10966218261418107. doi:10.1177/10966218261418107. ISSN 1096-6218. PMID 41700973.
