= Al's Beef =

Sandwich chain in Chicagoland, United States

Al's Beef is an Italian beef sandwich brand founded in Chicago in 1938 by Al Ferreri and his sister and brother-in-law, Frances and Chris Pacelli, Sr. It specializes in heavily seasoned roast beef in gravy on soft French bread garnished with sweet or hot peppers. Al's Beef is currently operated by a grandson of the founder. Al's Beef's parent company is Chicago Franchise Systems, Inc.

== See also ==
- French dip
- List of regional dishes of the United States
- List of American sandwiches
- List of sandwiches
- Food of The Bear (TV series) § Italian beef sandwiches topped with giardiniera
