= Marcus Brooks =

Fictional character, The Bear TV series

- The Bear character
- Lionel Boyce as Marcus
- First appearance: "System"; June 23, 2022
- Last appearance: "The Original Beef of Chicagoland"; June 25, 2026
- Created by: Christopher Storer
- Portrayed by: Lionel Boyce

In-universe information
- Occupation: Pastry chef

Marcus Brooks is a fictional character on the FX Network television series The Bear. Created by Christopher Storer and played by Lionel Boyce, Marcus was the bread baker at the Original Beef of Chicagoland sandwich shop under owner Mikey Berzatto (Jon Bernthal). After Mikey's death, his brother Carmy Berzatto (Jeremy Allen White) took over the restaurant and encouraged Marcus' interest in pastry.

== Biography ==
Marcus is a beloved and essential figure at the Berzatto family restaurants. New owner Carmy, in company with Sydney Adamu (Ayo Edebiri), is dedicated to nurturing the staff he inherited from his brother; according to one critic, "It isn't a coincidence that Carmy's biological family is portrayed as an acidic, toxic hindrance to his career, and that the [family] he's created for his team—via his network of chefs—is the literal opposite." This impulse to nurture working-class staffers like Marcus, Tina, and Richie and invest in training them in specialized skills distinguishes Carmy and Syd from their more capitalistic or corporatized restaurant executive peers; "The owners and managers (good ones at least) are positive forces of change in their employees lives. The more a business feels safe and familiar, the better chance it has at success." Marcus played NCAA Division III college football, his position was outside linebacker. (Boyce played the same position for El Camino College in Torrance, California.)

After college he worked at a phone company and then at McDonald's before looking for a new job when his mom got sick. He was hired by Mikey Berzatto at the Beef, where Marcus had previously been a customer. He tells Luca in season 2 that he's been a cook for about a year and a half, meaning he started at McDonald's and/or the Beef the summer or fall before Mikey's February 2022 suicide. Originally tasked with baking the French rolls for the Italian beef sandwiches, over the course of season 1 he becomes fascinated with donuts and begins to study pastry; his notes on donuts include references to "Dominique Ansel's cronut, but also hints at creations from Pierre Hermé and Christina Tosi."

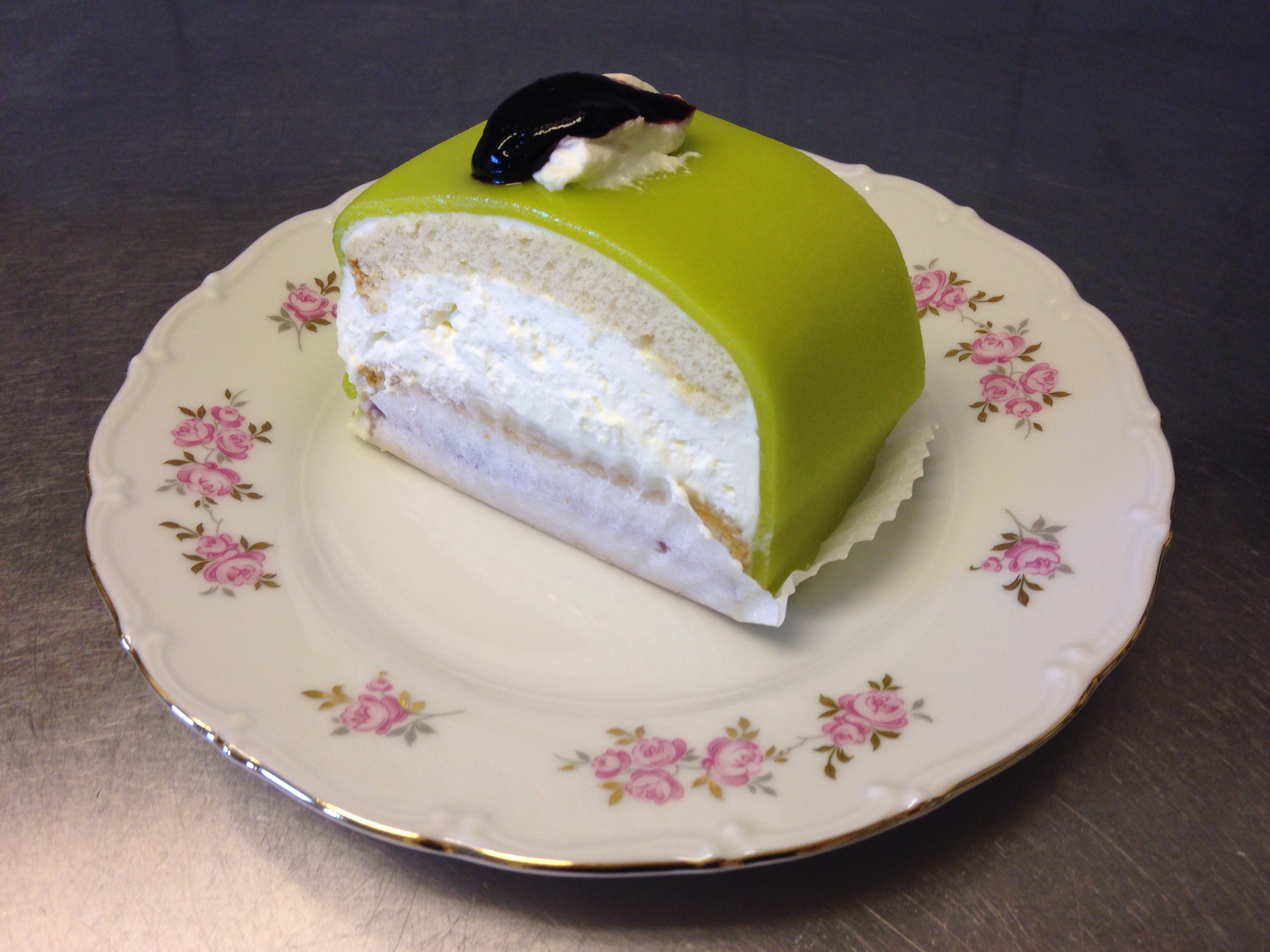
Princess cake, one of the desserts Marcus prepares for the Bear

After Marcus became a pastry chef, Carmy and Sydney sent Marcus to Noma in Copenhagen, Denmark, to train with Chef Luca (Will Poulter), a former colleague of Carmy's at the show's fictionalized three-star version of Chicago's Ever. Boyce staged with Talia Richard-Carvajal at Hart Bageri in Copenhagen for two weeks before filming season 2. The training was hugely successful and Marcus was named one of Food & Wine magazine's Best New Chefs within six months of the opening of the Bear restaurant.

Marcus has a comparatively quiet, introverted personality. Marcus' fear, confessed at his roommate's ex-boss' wedding, is that he might lose the creative spark that animates his work. Marcus becomes very close with Chef Carmen's sister and the restaurant's business manager, Natalie Berzatto Katinsky, and he is the first person at the restaurant she trusts to hold her new baby Sophie when she comes back to work after maternity leave. He is also close friends with Chef Sydney. Boyce told an interviewer in 2024, "Carmy, Syd, Tina, Richie, Ebra, and everybody in that kitchen is now his found family."

== Family ==
James Brooks	Angela Brooks (1956–2023)
Marcus Brooks	Younger brother

Marcus was raised by a single mother; she died of a chronic illness (which had rendered her non-verbal) on the evening of the Bear's soft launch. The Bear creator Christopher Storer told Boyce in conversation that her diagnosis was amyotrophic lateral sclerosis (ALS). Marcus' stoic but heartfelt eulogy for his mother opens the season 3 episode "Doors." According to Brooks, during the remainder of the season he seeks "to turn his grief into inspiration." Marcus' father, James, was absent for most of his life but reaches out after the death of Marcus' mom; Marcus and Carmy bond during season 4 over their long-absent fathers and how their work family sometimes fills the gaps of loneliness found in half-empty homes. Marcus invites his father to the restaurant during the events of season 5, and they agree to connect soon. Marcus has a younger brother, and a cousin Terrell. Alma Washington plays Marcus' mom Angela Brooks in season 2, and Harry Lennix plays Marcus' father James Brooks.

== Costuming ==
The costume designer put Marcus in a beanie for the pilot, and when the cast reconvened to shoot the rest of season 1, two costume options that attracted the attention of Boyce were the same Carhartt beanie and Infrared Jordans that Lionel Boyce wore to culinary training in Copenhagen. The beanies he wears to work most of the time are "never super bright colors, which blend in just enough with the show's use of blues, greens, and jewel tones. This seems to be a common pattern in costume and highlighted things in the series."

Brooks wears a lot of streetwear brands including Jordan and Fear of God. As of season 2, his T-shirts were sourced from Joe Freshgoods, Off-White, and Aimé Leon Dore. Marcus owns and wears a substantial collection of New Balance sneakers. In season 3 he wore a Tissot Powermatic 80 watch, and in season 4 he wore a Casio G-Shock watch.

== See also ==
- List of The Bear characters
- List of The Bear episodes
- Food of The Bear
- Music on The Bear
- Family on The Bear
