= Sweeps (The Bear) =

Fictional character, The Bear TV series

- The Bear character
- Corey Hendrix as Sweeps in season 3
- First appearance: "System"; June 23, 2022
- Last appearance: "The Original Beef of Chicagoland"; June 25, 2026
- Created by: Christopher Storer
- Portrayed by: Corey Hendrix

In-universe information
- Full name: Gary Woods
- Nickname: Sweeps
- Occupation: sommelier; restaurant server; janitor; retired professional athlete

Gary Woods, also known as Sweeps, is a fictional character on the FX Network television series The Bear. Created by Christopher Storer and played by Corey Hendrix, Sweeps was once a professional baseball player (where he swept the Padres but then failed the drug test), and later worked at the Original Beef of Chicagoland sweeping the floors. Sweeps now works front of house as the Bear's sommelier.

== Casting ==
Hendrix originally auditioned for a "day player" role on the show but at the callback realized "it's a different character, and I felt like I may have done something wrong...[but] it turned into, like, just a great thing with Sweeps".

== Biography ==
=== Baseball ===
Sweeps is a former professional baseball player. Sweeps' baseball career, which ended when he tested positive for steroid use, included sweeping the Padres, and he also "swept St. Louis three times and had a no-hitter." Sweeps could not afford housing while trying out for the Chicago Cubs and playing on their farm team. He was a left fielder for AAA teams and was also recognized for his hitting skill. Getting a job at the Beef pulled him out of a "dark place" after his expulsion from baseball. In keeping with his baseball background, Sweeps is wearing Nike Air Griffey Max 1 shoes when he puts out the stovetop grease fire in "Braciole."

=== Beef and wine ===
He worked at Mikey Berzatto's Original Beef of Chicagoland as a runner and janitor, sweeping and mopping floors at the local Italian beef sandwich shop. Under Carmy Berzatto's ownership, Sweeps retrained to be the sommelier of the fine-dining restaurant the Bear. Cru Beaujolais from Maison L'Envoye is served on opening night. The bottles behind the bar that night include a Danish pét-nat and a Nebbiolo.

Multiple wine websites complained that despite the "fine dining overkill" of season 3, wine should have been centered as part of the new restaurant. In season 3, the Bear sent Sweeps to train at the Court of Master Sommeliers. He is also given a copy of The Original Scratch and Sniff Guide to Becoming a Wine Expert and "thinks he's being trolled" but author Richard Betts is a "legendary sommelier" and the book "well-respected." Real-life Chicago somm Singh told Wine Enthusiast, "I met with Corey Hendrix...and I explained the psyche of a sommelier...You can feel like you don't belong in the room, particularly if you’re a person of color. It brings its own 'terroir' to the situation...People are coming into the restaurant whose suit and tie is worth more than you're making every month." He is depicted studying out of The Oxford Companion to Wine and The World Atlas of Wine. In real life Singh told Hendrix to look into the styling of DLynn Proctor, who appeared in the documentary Somm, commenting that "male sommeliers...they always have like that sharp suit, the tie with the double windsor knot, the little pocket handkerchief."

Wine Enthusiast commended the show for capturing "especially well...the passion, sense of purpose and curiosity that can take hold so quickly for someone new to the field." Profit margins on restaurant food are often only four to five percent, which means that the higher-margin beverage program contributes a great deal to profitability. Computer tells Natalie in "Green" that alcoholic beverage sales are a highlight of the Bear's otherwise flimsy finances.

=== Pairings ===
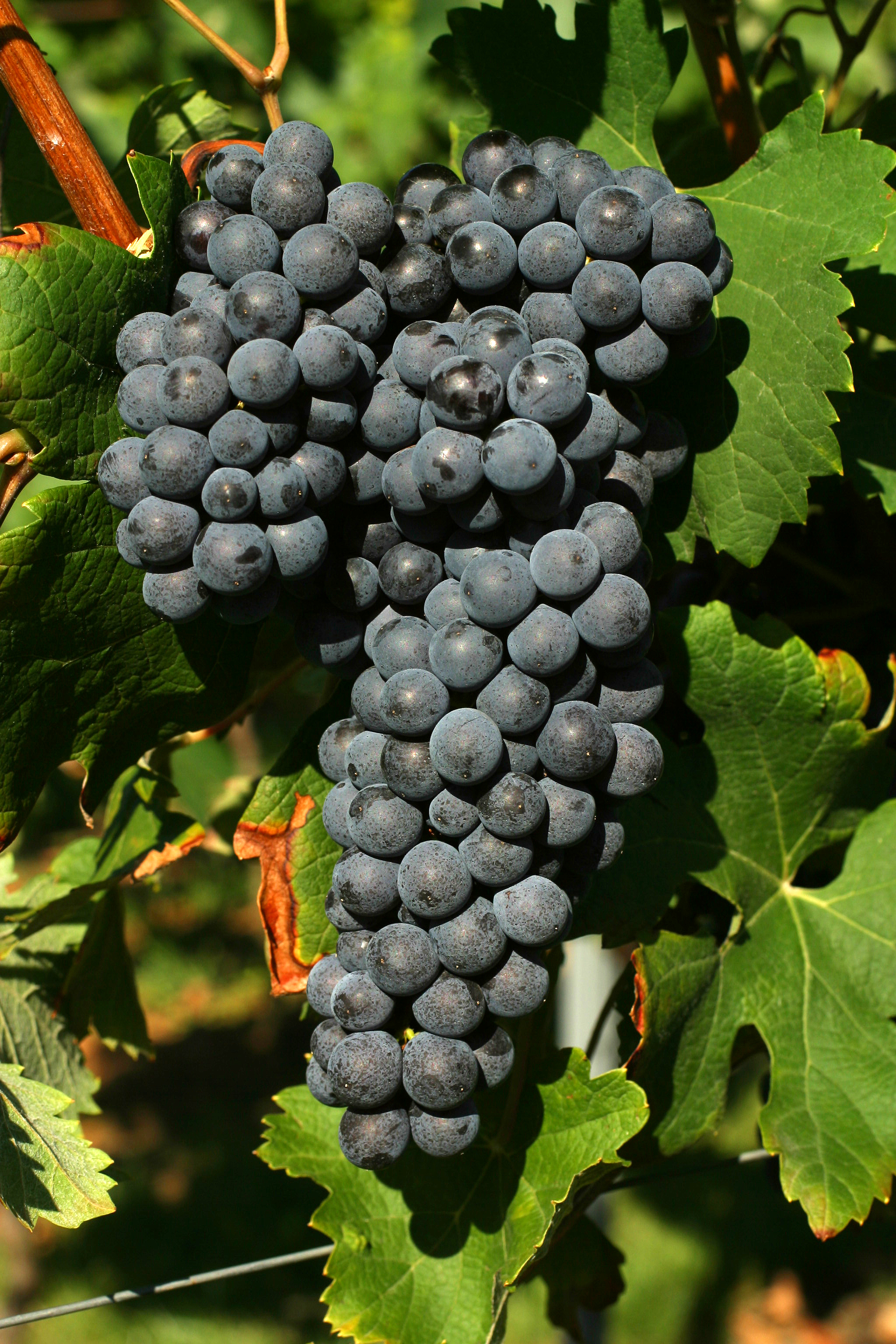
Nebbiolo, a red grape used to make Piedmont wine

The learning curve is steep. In "Doors," Sweeps battles a partially extracted wine cork: "A handpull would have finished it, but he unsuccessfully goes after it with a wine key." Wine Spectator criticized the Bear's wine custodianship because the wine bottles should be stored on their sides, not standing. Sydney sends the struggling Sweeps to train on wine and food pairings with Alpana Singh. Singh teaches him about pairings for fish dishes and mushrooms, and talks tannins and Pinot noir, "the somm's best friend."

By the end of season 4, Gary appears to have mastered the art. One wine website described his pairings as "perfect," another called them "spot on." Sweeps suggests pairing a "shapeshifter" Chenin blanc wine with their strawberry panna cotta. According to Tasting Table, on the last day of service before Computer's doomsday clock runs out, he recommends a white wine, a rosé, and two reds. The white wine, a blend of Sauvignon blanc and Sémillon, and the rosé, both from the Napa winery Hourglass, will pair well with flower or fruit flavors and Syd's scallop. One of the reds is a "heavy" cerrati Barolo (or cerrati Nebbiolo) from the Tenuta Cucco winery near Turin. The other red is a Château Clerc Milon blend of Cabernet Sauvignon, Merlot, Cabernet Franc, Petit Verdot, and Carménère. Both reds will pair well with red meat like beef or lamb.

Sweeps is also working on distinguishing aged wines, which "aren't generally on a beginning sommelier's radar," but the "blind" tasting is no good, because wine color is often key to determining vintage. Pamela Vachon of Wine Enthusiast suggested this is a relatively new sommelier's insecurity showing, but while "Imposter syndrome may be at play...so is over-delivery—like a great value US$50 wine—all of [the Bear employees] punching above their weight class in the quest to protect a restaurant that they believe is worth fighting for."

=== Season 5 ===
In season 5, as the Bear restaurant seems to be circling the drain, Sweeps reaches out to his network, trying to find a new gig, whatever might be available: "I'll sweep up, work nights, whatever." There is a dry white Aligoté on the wine list during "final service" at the Bear. In "Green" and in season 5, the show features multiple vintages of Amarone wine from Serégo Alighieri, a vineyard located slightly north of Verona, Region of Veneto, Italy, that has been owned by 21 generations of descendants of the poet Dante Alighieri. Natalie describes the Chicago streets on the day of season 5 as being like Dante's "seventh circle of hell."

== Reception ==
Wine Enthusiast described the character as a "somm who is sort of figuring it out but has to also embody...swagger and bravado in service." Cinema Blend called Sweeps "one of The Bear's veteran characters who has yet to receive his time in the sun". BuzzFeed wrote that Sweeps is a "minor character who still shines with his minimal screen time."
