= Ebra =

Fictional character, The Bear TV series

- The Bear character
- Edwin Lee Gibson as Ebra in season 1
- First appearance: "System"; June 23, 2022
- Last appearance: "The Original Beef of Chicagoland"; June 25, 2026
- Created by: Christopher Storer
- Portrayed by: Edwin Lee Gibson

In-universe information
- Full name: Ebraheim
- Occupation: Cook

Ebraheim, called Ebra, is a fictional character on the FX Network television series The Bear. Created by Christopher Storer and played by Edwin Lee Gibson, Ebra is an immigrant to the United States, a veteran soldier, and a line cook at the Original Beef of Chicagoland sandwich shop in the River North neighborhood. He is supportive of new owner Carmen Berzatto (Jeremy Allen White) but initially struggles to find purpose when the Beef is remodeled into the high-end Bear.

== Biography ==
Ebra is a line cook who has worked at the Berzatto family restaurant for a long time. Like his friend Tina Marrero (Liza Colón-Zayas), Ebra is in large part motivated to excel at his work because of his love for Mikey Berzatto (Jon Bernthal), an abiding affection he later transfers to heir Carmy. When the Beef shutters for renovation into what becomes the Bear, chefs Carmy and Sydney (Ayo Edebiri) sent line cooks Ebra and Tina to culinary school for the interregnum. Tina delighted in the continuing education, but Ebra "quietly [dropped] out...before returning to feed working-class locals at the Bear's lunchtime sandwich window." As explained by The Bear's culinary producer Courtney Storer, "Ebraheim was very adamant that culinary school didn't feel right to him, yet he really enjoyed his contribution at work every day. He understood the significance of The Beef, and it felt uncomfortable to be pivoting out of that. It shows something that a lot of cooks experience in restaurants. When the menu changes, or the direction of the restaurant changes, oftentimes you have people who don't want to change, and really enjoy what is so integral and special about it. Whether you're in a restaurant or you're in tech, or a hospital, or a teacher, when you start to learn something new, it is very vulnerable."

Owner Carmy eventually re-opened the Italian beef sandwich window and tasked Ebra with its management, as something of an afterthought, which may have been suggestive of both Carmy's general dreaminess and his lifelong effort to distance himself from the traumatic working-class background he left behind as a teenager. Later in season three, Carmy and his sister, Bear business manager Natalie Berzatto Katinsky (Abby Elliott), brought in Pop-and-Mikey-era Beef veterans Chi-Chi (Christopher Zucchero) and Chuckie (Paulie James) to help Ebra with the sandwich window, funding their paychecks with revenue from that sector of the business specifically. In season four, the enterprising Ebra sought to "create opportunity" for the larger Berzatto family by engaging consultant Albert Schnur (Rob Reiner) to develop a plan for expanding the sandwich business into multiple locations. The sandwiches are a profit center for the business, so the stoic Ebra may well save the entire family from breaking up and scattering to the winds, a "twist that perfectly fits Storer's world...[which] celebrates dedication and greatness in the most unlikely places." Reiner's Schnur shared his final scene on The Bear with Brian Koppelman's Computer, during which they agreed that "the sandwich is the icon, not the star chef everyone frantically orbits" and that "Ebra's ingenuity and efficiency in running The Bear's lunch window may be what saves the restaurant, along with the collective dream of everyone who worked themselves to a nub to make it possible." During a 2024 panel discussion on socio-economic class representation on The Bear, Chicago Tribune restaurant critic Louisa Kung Liu Chung said, "I'm sorry, but I could do with fewer fuzzy flashbacks of Claire and would like to at least know Ebra's last name since his sandwich window is carrying the restaurant right now."

Ebra is a nomadic figure who has traveled widely in his day. Before coming to the United States, he lived in East Africa and the Middle East. His exact country of origin has not been identified, although in season one he told Tina, "In Somalia, I am grillmaster." He is a war veteran, and may be a refugee. Further to the point, when butt-stabbed Richie goes to Ebraheim for urgent care in "Review," he asks to be told about "the factions." Ebra begins describing the roles of Siad Barre and Mohamed Farrah Aidid in the Somali Rebellion and Somali Civil War. Richie recognizes the proper nouns in the story from a movie by his favorite director, Ridley Scott: "Wait, is this shit fuckin' Black Hawk Down? Fuckin' Piven!" The original character description given to Gibson was that Ebra is "a mystery who's lived 1,000 lives." In the pilot Ebra is anxious about eating Sydney's family meal because it looks like it might be pork, which he does not want to eat.

According to Ebon Moss-Bachrach about the season-one crisis of "Review," when Sydney stabs Richie, "There's a protocol! They have a protocol in place. [Richie] immediately calls Ebraheim, they go straight up to the front, they know where to go. Ebraheim has experience with triage. It's like any other day for him." Ebra is described by one critic as a man of wisdom with a "strong, silent presence" that offers "a calming contrast to the high-decibel action surrounding him...the character is not just a kitchen hand but someone with a rich backstory and a sense of dignity that informs his work ethic."

Ebra has arthritis. He smokes cigars, most memorably at the Chess Pavilion at Lincoln Park facing Lake Michigan after he drops out of culinary school in season 2.

== See also ==
- List of The Bear characters
- List of The Bear episodes
- Food of The Bear
- Music on The Bear
- Family on The Bear
- Bibliography of The Bear
