= Italian beef =

Roast beef sandwich originating in Chicago

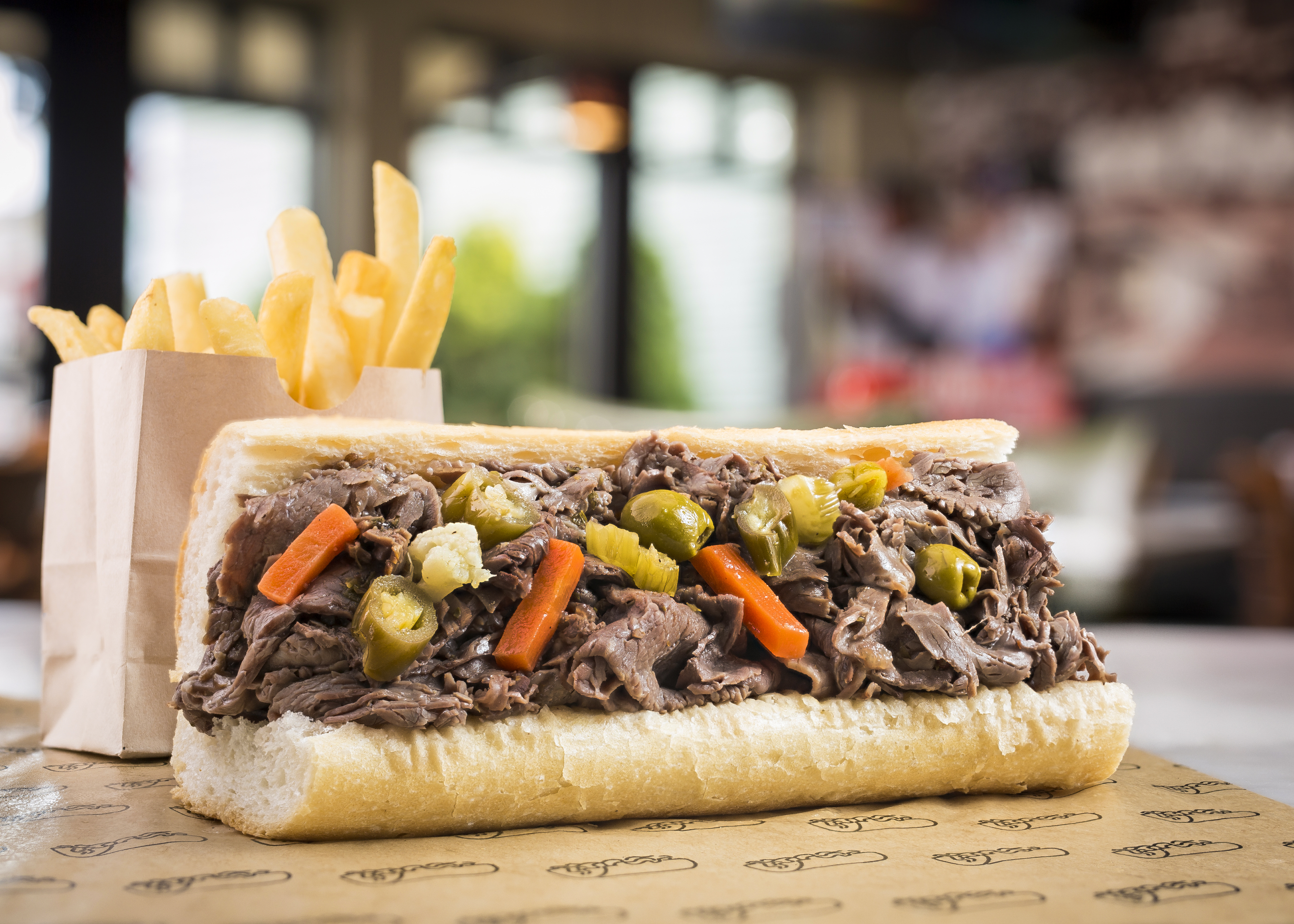
- Italian beef sandwich
- Type: Sandwich
- Place of origin: United States
- Region or state: Chicago, Illinois
- Created by: Multiple claims
- Serving temperature: Hot
- Main ingredients: Roast beef, French bread
- Variations: Multiple

An Italian beef is a sandwich of Chicago origin made from thin slices of roast beef simmered and served with a thin gravy on French bread. Common toppings are a choice between spicy giardiniera (called "hot") or mild bell peppers (called "sweet"). The entire sandwich may be dipped in the juice the meat is cooked in before serving with a side of French fries.

The sandwich traces back to Italian-American immigrants in Chicago as early as the 1930s, but the exact origin is unknown. The sandwich gradually grew in popularity and was widely eaten in the city by the 1970s and 1980s. The sandwich saw a substantial rise in popularity with the 2020s television show The Bear, set in a fictional Chicago restaurant that specializes in the sandwich.

== Preparation ==
The sandwich is made from beef that has been roasted in beef stock and other seasonings. A 1962 recipe calls for bay leaves, garlic powder, tomato paste, and crushed dried red pepper. The choice of beef cut varies. Inside round is commonly used due to its ease of preparation, but some restaurants use top sirloin. The meat is cooked until it is not pink in the middle. When it is done, it is sliced as thinly as possible, usually thinner than one would for a roast beef sandwich. It is then soaked in the juices it was cooked in.

The sandwich is typically served on French bread. The bread is typically crusty so it does not fall apart after being dipped.

Traditionally the sandwich is either ordered "sweet" with grilled or boiled bell peppers, or "hot" with spicy giardiniera. The sandwich can also be topped with cheese (mozzarella, provolone, or cheddar). Some restaurants offer the addition of Italian sausage, typically called a "combo." Marinara sauce is sometimes offered as a topping.

To assemble an Italian beef, the meat is transferred to the bread still wet, followed by the desired toppings. The completed sandwich is then traditionally dunked in juices before serving. The amount of juices added can be customized using terminology such as "dipped," "dunked," or "wet", but the definitions vary among restaurants. An Italian beef can also be ordered "dry", with or without a side of gravy. Some restaurants sell "gravy bread," bread dipped in juices without meat or toppings.

== History ==
The exact origin of the sandwich is unknown. One possible origin is that the sandwich was invented by Italian American immigrants who sliced inexpensive beef cuts exceedingly thin to feed many people and to tenderize tougher cuts of beef that they were limited to buying due to discrimination. The beef was served on bread to further stretch the meal and mask the poor quality of the meat. Some historians believe that Pasquale Scala invented the sandwich in the 1920s to serve at weddings. Al's Beef claims that Tony Ferreri invented the sandwich in the 1920s to serve at weddings; his son Al later began selling beef sandwiches in 1938.

According to the Chicago Tribune, the sandwich was not very popular in the 1950s and 1960s, but it began to take off in the 1970s. By the 1980s, the sandwich was ubiquitous throughout Chicago and celebrities such as Neil Diamond and Jay Leno reportedly enjoyed the sandwich. Still, the sandwich was relatively unknown outside the region until the release of The Bear in 2022. Restaurants across the U.S. reported a surge in demand for the sandwich in the months following the premiere of the show. Chris Zucchero, owner of Mr. Beef, starred in the pilot episode, which was filmed in his restaurant.

== See also ==
- Food of The Bear (TV series) § Italian beef sandwiches topped with giardiniera
- French dip
- List of American sandwiches
- List of regional dishes of the United States
- List of sandwiches
- Philly cheesesteak
