= Tina Marrero =

Fictional character, The Bear TV series

- The Bear character
- Liza Colón-Zayas as Tina in "Beef"
- First appearance: "System"; June 23, 2022
- Last appearance: "The Original Beef of Chicagoland"; June 25, 2026
- Created by: Christopher Storer
- Portrayed by: Liza Colón-Zayas

In-universe information
- Full name: Bettina Marrero
- Nickname: T
- Occupation: cook; chef de cuisine
- Spouse: David
- Children: Louie

Tina Marrero, sometimes T for short, is a fictional character on the FX Network television series The Bear. Created by Christopher Storer and played by Liza Colón-Zayas, Tina works as a cook at the Berzatto family restaurant in the River North neighborhood of Chicago. For her performance, Colón-Zayas won the Primetime Emmy Award for Outstanding Supporting Actress in a Comedy Series.

== Casting ==
The role of Tina was originally written in the pilot as a man and they changed it. Initially conceived as a recurring role, per casting director Jeanie Bacharach, Liza Colón-Zayas "was just so dynamite that they had her [stay]."

== Biography ==
Tina has been described as "beloved and snarky." She is a middle-aged, working-class Latina. Tina worked as a payroll administrator at a confectionery for a decade before she was laid off from that job. She struggled to find a new opportunity, hampered by limited skill set and likely ageism in a market indisposed to hire middle-aged women. First hired by Michael "Mikey" Berzatto (Jon Bernthal) to work at the Original Beef of Chicago sandwich shop about five years before the events of the series, Tina initially revolts at the new kitchen regime installed by Mikey's brother and heir, nationally acclaimed chef Carmy Berzatto.

Tina initially does not respond well to the changes implemented at the Beef by Carmy (Jeremy Allen White) and his new-hire culinary partner Sydney (Ayo Edebiri).

As described in one study of the show, "Tina is the most overtly resistant to Carmy's management. She talks badly about Carmy to the other employees, ignores his directions, and does tasks in the way that she prefers, even when this derails the productivity of the kitchen. Tina calls Carmy Jeff instead of Chef, refusing to comply with the restaurant norm of addressing colleagues. This annoys Carmy, but he chooses his battles and avoids pulling rank on small matters. He wants to change the restaurant but does not want to change the community that has developed among the workers." Tina's "icy" response is driven by fear of change; the kitchen revamp mirrors neighborhood gentrification in Chicago that imperils her job and her ability to contribute to her household finances. For most of season one she wears an apron that Mikey gave her. Costume designer Christina Spiridakis bought it off Amazon.com and "included it to represent the hodgepodge business Michael was running. 'It's Tina's house as much as it's Richie's...Mrs. Always Right is who she is." After coming around to the merits of the new system, Tina becomes a devoted supporter of Carm and Syd, who repay her loyalty and attest to their faith in her potential by sending her to culinary school while the building is being remodeled from the seedy Beef into a new fine-dining destination called the Bear. In season 2 Sydney asks Tina to be her sous-chef, and in season 5 Sydney asks Tina to her chef de cuisine, and Tina says yes.

In season 2, Chef Berzatto also gives her his own high-end hand-forged Yoshimi Echizen knife to use and keep. While in culinary school she gets invited to karaoke at Alice's in Avondale. Todd Lazarski of The A.V. Club wrote "With a faraway look, one of longing, maybe, it's easy to wonder: Is she singing about Ebra? A lost love? Perhaps a knife? What else don't we know about her? Much of the episode stays in this vein of remembrance of life aside, or before, the call of kitchen duty. Carmy hangs out, almost approaching fun; Ebra looks at the water, smokes, disappears. But Tina really digs deep and delivers on the heart-rending show-stopper of being there. Spanish is the loving tongue, as a wise man once said. From the crowd's reaction, it appears true." The producers knew of the song because it was used in Something Wild. In the words of the Exclaim! critic, "It turns out that Tina can really fucking sing, and she absolutely brings the house down with a rendition of the bilingual country ballad 'Before the Next Teardrop Falls.'"

Tina loved Mikey, who gave her a job when no one else would, as depicted in the season three flashback episode "Napkins," and she now embraces an equally warm relationship with his surviving brother. According to Colón-Zayas, "Tina is in love with this family, with her [Original Beef of Chicagoland] family." She could possibly look for work elsewhere but her dedication to the found family of the restaurant is the reason she continues to push her old limits through seasons three and four.

Tina preps Puerto Rican dishes including pollo guisado and carne guisada to simmer in the Crock-Pot during the workday for family dinner. She's English–Spanish bilingual and a talented singer, as evidenced by her season 2 performance of "Before the Next Teardrop Falls". She does not have a car, but does know how to drive, as she uses the Bear van for farmer's market runs.

== Sources ==
- Franklin-Phipps, Asilia; Varga, Bretton A. (Fall 2024). "Bear(ing) Down: Encountering Posthuman Critical Media Studies through the (Re)tracing of Object and Embodiment". Journal of Posthumanism. 4 (3): 205–216. doi:10.33182/joph.v4i3.3290. ISSN 2634-3584.
