= Edwin Lee Gibson =

American actor

Edwin Lee Gibson is an American actor, best known for his role as Ebraheim in the FX on Hulu television series The Bear.

== Early life and education ==
Gibson grew up in the South Park neighborhood of Houston. He first began pursuing acting at the age of 16, when he appeared in a production of The Wiz, portraying The Tinman. Gibson graduated from Empire State University in 2012 with a Bachelor of Arts, and received a Master of Fine Arts from Point Park University. He also attended Texas Southern University, studying math and theatre.

== Career ==
From 1998 to 2006, Gibson taught musical theatre in Rye, New York. He began performing on stage, receiving an Obie Award in 2006 for his performance in The Seven. Gibson made guest appearances in television series such as Law & Order: Special Victims Unit, Shameless and Fargo. He would be cast in The Bear in October 2021. Alongside his castmates, Gibson won the Screen Actors Guild Award for Outstanding Performance by an Ensemble in a Comedy Series at the 30th Screen Actors Guild Awards. In 2022, he appeared as Bill Russell in the HBO series Winning Time: The Rise of the Lakers Dynasty.

== Filmography ==
=== Film ===
Year	Title	Role	Notes
2017	Mom and Dad	Mr. Hall	
2017	Marshall	Bartender	
2024	She Taught Love	Kevin Waters	
2027	Air Bud Returns †	Jack	Filming

=== Television ===
Year	Title	Role	Notes
2010	Law & Order	Ben Robinson	1 episode
2014	Law & Order: Special Victims Unit	Orton Freeman	2 episodes
2016	Shameless	Able-Bodied Person #1	1 episode
2017	Downward Dog	Trendy Guy	1 episode
2017	Chicago P.D.	Milton	1 episode
2019	Proven Innocent	Omar Blackwell	1 episode
2020	Fargo	Happy Halloway	2 episodes
2022–2023	Winning Time: The Rise of the Lakers Dynasty	Bill Russell	2 episodes
2022–2026	The Bear	Ebraheim	Recurring role (seasons 1-3); Main role (seasons 4-5); 36 episodes
2023–2024	Unprisoned	Fox	Recurring role; 6 episodes
2026	Fallout	Shotgun Jeff	2 episodes
