= Ricky Staffieri =

American actor (b. c. 1992)

- Born: c. 1992; United States

Ricky Staffieri (b. c. 1992) is an American television actor and film producer, best known for his role as Ted Fak on The Bear since 2023. In 2025 he was cast in Eric Kripke's forthcoming TV series Vought Rising.

== Career ==
Staffieri studied theater and film at Columbia College Chicago and was cast in commercials and small parts in Chicago PD and Better Call Saul.

He started on the show as a member of The Bear crew and first appeared onscreen in season two's "Fishes" in 2023. He frequently appears in scenes with Matty Matheson, who plays his onscreen brother Neil Fak, and "while many of Neil and Teddy's scenes seem like improvised riffing, Matheson insists it is all pre-written by Storer and his team." A recurring character in seasons three and four, ScreenRant commented that "Expanding Staffieri's role was the perfect choice to help transform The Bear's comedy, allowing the Fak brothers to break up the tension and help ground the show." In 2024 Eater commented that "the entire Fak family, including Neil's brother Ted (Ricky Staffieri) and a few other relatives that pop up in hilarious cameos, is a charming foil to the acerbic Berzattos." Staffieri was one of several Bear castmates, including Sarah Ramos, Rene Gube, and Keith Kupferer, who were cast in a long-form Coca-Cola Company ad directed by Chris Storer. Staffieri appeared in a J. Crew campaign for a limited-edition The Bear merch offering for Matter of Fak Supply gear.

In 2025 Staffieri was cast in the spinoff of The Boys called Vought Rising and a "Bitcoin comedy feature" titled What the F*ck Is My Password? Password? filmed in autumn 2025 on location in New Jersey.
