= Corey Hendrix =

American actor

Corey Hendrix is an American actor who has had recurring roles on the television programs The Bear and Fargo. His character on The Bear, Gary "Sweeps" Woods, is a former professional baseball player turned sommelier.

== Biography ==
Hendrix is a native of Chicago, Illinois, and grew up in the K-Town section of the North Lawndale neighborhood.

He had a recurring role as Curtis on The Chi. Hendrix played Omie Sparkman on season four of Fargo, which was set in Kansas City, Missouri, in the 1950s. Hendrix began playing professional baseball player turned sandwich-shop runner turned sommelier Gary "Sweeps" Woods on The Bear in 2022. Hendrix shared a Screen Actors Guild Award with the rest of The Bear cast in 2024.

Hendrix shared his personal insights on Chicago's African-American community and culture for The Bear season four episode "Worms." Castmates and co-writers Ayo Edebiri and Lionel Boyce talked with Hendrix about the vibe and setting of Sydney Adamu's cousin's Chantel's house and nearby hair salon on the South Side of Chicago. Edebiri enquired with Hendrix about potential neighborhood settings: "...Bronzeville? Or do you think it's more Englewood or Chatham? We're talking about the looming gentrification, so we want it to be close to a shop that's nice and shiny—maybe that's East Garfield." Edebiri also included something that Hendrix said to her during the filming of season one, turning it into a line for Chantel (Danielle Deadwyler): "That's in the north, right? You know their beefs be different. Put some cheese on it!"
