= Andrew Wehde =

American cinematographer

- Occupation: Cinematographer
- Years active: 2011–present

Andrew Wehde is an American cinematographer. He won a Primetime Emmy Award and was nominated for another one in the category Outstanding Cinematography for his work on the television program The Bear. He was nominated again in 2026 for the episode "Scallop."
