= Review (The Bear) =

- The Bear episode
- Episode no.: Season 1 Episode 7
- Directed by: Christopher Storer
- Written by: Joanna Calo
- Cinematography by: Andrew Wehde
- Editing by: Joanna Naugle
- Production code: XCBV1007
- Original release date: June 23, 2022
- Running time: 20 minutes

Guest appearances
- Matty Matheson as Neil Fak; Edwin Lee Gibson as Ebraheim; Corey Hendrix as Gary "Sweeps" Woods; Richard Esteras as Manny; Jose Cervantes Jr. as Angel; Pedro Henrique as Louie

Episode chronology
← Previous "Ceres"	Next → "Braciole"
- The Bear season 1

"Review" is the seventh episode of the first season of the American television comedy-drama The Bear. The episode was written by executive producer Joanna Calo and directed by series creator Christopher Storer. It was released on Hulu on June 23, 2022, along with the rest of the season.

The series follows Carmen "Carmy" Berzatto, an award-winning New York City chef de cuisine, who returns to his hometown of Chicago to run his late brother Michael's failing Italian beef sandwich shop. The episode is set in real time, and follows the characters as they prepare to open the shop, when chaos ensues in the kitchen. The episode is the shortest of the season at 20 minutes, 18 of which are presented as a single take.

The episode received widespread acclaim from critics, who praised the episode's originality, cinematography, Storer's directing, performances, character development, sound mixing and tension. It was named among the best TV episodes of 2022 by many critics, and also received award nominations, including wins for Outstanding Directing for a Comedy Series and Outstanding Supporting Actress in a Comedy Series (for Ayo Edebiri) at the 75th Primetime Emmy Awards.

== Plot ==
The episode opens with a clip of WXRT host Lin Brehmer announcing the song "Chicago" by Sufjan Stevens which then starts playing over the opening credits.

With 20 minutes before opening, the crew prepares for their shifts. Ebraheim (Edwin Lee Gibson) reads aloud a food critic's highly favorable review of The Beef. The critic highlights a risotto dish that Sydney (Ayo Edebiri) had been experimenting with and then gave him to avoid it going to waste, unaware that she was serving it to a critic. Carmy (Jeremy Allen White) arrives, telling Ebraheim to stop reading the review. Realizing her mistake, Sydney tries to get approval from Carmy for going over the head chef's head (having placed him on the spot with a rave review for a new dish the place doesn't carry), and Carmy temporarily acquiesces, not wanting to disrupt the kitchen right before the to-go system launch.

Tina (Liza Colón-Zayas) arrives late, being forced to bring her son Louie (Pedro Henrique) after he was suspended from school. She asks Carmy to teach him culinary skills, so he assigns Sydney to help Louie. As they prepare for the opening, Sydney and Richie (Ebon Moss-Bachrach) get into an argument regarding her desire to put the risotto dish on the menu. Meanwhile, the staff learn that Sydney accidentally left the pre-order option on for the shop's to-go service, leaving them with hundreds of orders that will be due in less than 10 minutes. Overwhelmed, an increasingly furious Carmy screams at the staff to start cooking everything they have. With everyone's nerves on edge with the rush, the staff's conflicts come to a head as Sydney and Richie continue arguing and Carmy furiously shouts at the staff to keep working. Nervous about her now three mishaps (the non-existent dish that the first walk-in customers are already calling for, the take-out fiasco, and the unattended pastry chef being completely behind), kitchen manager Sydney curses out her protegee Tina and doubles down on her argument with Richie, calling him a miserable loser whose daughter must be ashamed of him.

Completely oblivious to the chaos in the kitchen, Marcus (Lionel Boyce) neglects his cake-making duties in order to experiment with his side project of perfecting a donut. When Marcus tries to show his latest attempt to Carmy, he angrily throws it on the floor, prompting Marcus to walk out. Seeing this, Richie and Sydney stop their argument as they try to tell Carmy to calm down, only for Sydney to accidentally stab Richie with her knife. Though Richie resignedly brushes it off while he has Ebraheim treat his wound, Sydney finally has enough and quits with just one minute left before opening. She curses Carmy as she walks out, blaming him for making the already bad situation in the kitchen worse with his behavior. Distressed, Carmy paces around the kitchen and tries Marcus' donut off the floor: apparently impressed by the results, he destroys the receipt machine and storms out of the kitchen in defeat.

== Production ==
=== Development ===
The episode was directed by series creator Christopher Storer and written by executive producer Joanna Calo. It was Calo's first writing credit, and Storer's fourth directing credit.

=== Filming ===
Christopher Storer mentioned that the episode was not supposed to be filmed in any specific manner. The idea of filming in a long take was only conceived two or three weeks before filming began, with Storer and Calo re-writing the script to accommodate the necessities of the episode. Calo said, "Having a penultimate episode where things fall apart is very Structure 101. Our dialogue is so stripped back, you find the need to let your camera do more work." Storer was impressed with the original script, but deemed that a cut would kill the momentum, and he felt filming it in one take was the best way to tell the story.

As Storer explained, the crew "wanted to make sure it was absolutely 100 percent in service of the story and not us showing off." To prepare for filming, Storer, Andrew Wehde and camera operator Gary Malouf calculated the route of the set that would be used for the actors, also filming a version of the route with an iPhone. The crew considered using certain points to make a cut if needed, but Storer was confident that the episode could be filmed in one take. Sound mixer Scott D. Smith wrote in 2025 that the 18-minute continuous shot "contained multiple complications for every department. Thanks to some incredible boom work on the part of my crew, we made it through, with virtually no ADR."

The cast reportedly filmed the sequence in four or five takes. With each take, the cast experimented with their performances, with Ebon Moss-Bachrach portraying his character more resigned, while Ayo Edebiri played her character more furious. According to Wehde, the crew did not use the most perfect version of the takes, settling for the "most intense and immersive": one mistake from the take used for the episode is the pile of relish on the floor while Carmy tastes the donut, which occurred due to Malouf knocking over a container of giardiniera. Storer felt that the first take could be used. They ultimately used either the second take (per film editor Joanna Naugle) or the fourth take (per cinematographer Andrew Wehde). Wehde said in 2023, "We didn't know it was going to work...The 100 or more people who made it happen plus the actors all cheered after every take. It was this eruption of celebration each time we did it, followed by a mad rush to reset the set as fast as they could with the real food and get the kitchen back to its moment before the lunch rush. It was amazing." Per Naugle, "They just nailed it pretty much right out of the gate. And every take was usable, too."

Jeremy Allen White explained, "They still managed to keep all of the important story points in place for episode seven, but they wrote it as a blueprint to allow us to shoot it in one shot. That was very important, obviously, for it to start with the words." White praised the episode, considering it as "it really lends itself to the story and where the characters are at because the tension is building so quickly we don't give the audience a break from it. There's no reprieve — it's consistent."

=== Sound design ===
According to supervising sound editor Steve "Major" Giammaria, "The three elements at play [in 'Review'] are really the ticket printer, the score, and the dialogue. Everything else plays around those as they weave in and out."

== Reception ==
=== Critical reviews ===
"Review" received widespread acclaim from critics, who praised the episode's cinematography, script, tension, performances. Rebekah Valentine of IGN wrote, "'Review' is especially incredible. It's shorter than any of the other episodes, and most of its action takes place over a very small handful of long, uncut shots in the restaurant that perfectly encapsulate the escalating chaos of the season's dramatic climax."

Tim Lowery of The A.V. Club praised the episode, deeming it as "one of the most impressive directing feats I've seen on television this year." Alan Sepinwall of Rolling Stone wrote, "It is far more panic-inducing than anything to come in the first few episodes, but the difference is that by now, The Bear has made us invested in Carmy, Sydney, Marcus, and all the others. The episode is still a two-ton stress bomb, but now one with people to root for and conflicts we have grown to care deeply about. It's incredible."

Marah Eakin of Vulture gave the episode a perfect 5 star out of 5 rating and wrote, "The Bear's seventh episode, 'Review,' is so good that it should be shown in film school just to show how much tension, backstory, and exposition a show's creators can pack into a mere 20 minutes of television." Nicole Gallucci of Decider praised the episode and compared it to the film Uncut Gems, writing, "'Review' is a remarkable, anxiety-inducing feat that harnesses tension as an art form. The performances are raw, ripe with passive aggression, and at times hard to watch — an especially disturbing truth, since the show has been praised for authentic depictions of abusive culinary workplaces. The dialogue is damning and seamlessly flows like a piping hot plate making its way through a kitchen. And the choice to capture the mayhem in a single shot both dazzles and disorients." Dina Paulson of Collider praised the episode's conclusion, writing "The character tension that boils over in 'Review' is, for sure, between the chefs in this extraordinary kitchen, but it also is about the self feeling self, in natural states of aggravation, healing, and absorbing pleasure because damn, sometimes a thing is so good it stops you in your mind tracks."

The episode was included in many publications as among the best TV episodes of 2022, including The Hollywood Reporter, TV Guide, Mashable, Rolling Stone, IndieWire, Entertainment Weekly, IGN, and Paste.

=== Accolades ===
For the episode, Christopher Storer won Outstanding Directing for a Comedy Series at the 75th Primetime Emmy Awards.

Award	Category	Nominee(s)	Result	Ref.
Astra TV Awards	Best Directing in a Streaming Comedy Series	Christopher Storer	Nominated	
Cinema Audio Society Awards	Outstanding Achievement in Sound Mixing for Television Series – Half Hour	Scott D. Smith, Steve Giammaria, Patrick Christensen, Ryan Collison, and Connor Nagy	Nominated	
Directors Guild of America Awards	Outstanding Directorial Achievement in Comedy Series	Christopher Storer	Nominated	
Golden Reel Awards	Outstanding Achievement in Sound Editing – Broadcast Short Form	Steve "Major" Giammaria, Jonathan Fuhrer, Evan Benjamin, Annie Taylor, Chris White, Leslie Bloome, and Shaun Brennan	Won	
Primetime Emmy Awards	Outstanding Directing for a Comedy Series	Christopher Storer	Won	
Primetime Emmy Awards	Outstanding Supporting Actress in a Comedy Series	Ayo Edebiri	Won	
Primetime Creative Arts Emmy Awards	Outstanding Sound Editing for a Comedy or Drama Series (Half-Hour) and Animation	Steve "Major" Giammaria, Evan Benjamin, Jonathan Fuhrer, Annie Taylor, Chris White, Leslie Bloome, and Shaun Brennan	Won	
Primetime Creative Arts Emmy Awards	Outstanding Sound Mixing for a Comedy or Drama Series (Half-Hour) and Animation	Steve "Major" Giammaria and Scott D. Smith	Won	

== Sources ==
- Smith, Scott D. (Fall 2025). "The Bear: The Challenges of Managing Kitchen Chaos". Production Sound & Video. 17 (4). North Hollywood, California: IATSE 695: 32–37.
