= Ceres (The Bear) =

- The Bear episode
- Episode no.: Season 1 Episode 6
- Directed by: Joanna Calo
- Written by: Catherine Schetina & Rene Gube
- Cinematography by: Andrew Wehde
- Editing by: Adam Epstein
- Production code: XCBV1006
- Original air date: June 23, 2022
- Running time: 30 minutes

Guest appearances
- Edwin Lee Gibson as Ebra; Corey Hendrix as Gary "Sweeps" Woods; Jon Bernthal as Michael "Mikey" Berzatto; Richard Esteras as Manny; Jose Cervantes Jr. as Angel; Abby Pierce as Erica; Vesily Deris as Crooked John; Richard Cotovsky as Mr. Carl; Dave Maher as man (reviewer)

Episode chronology
← Previous "Sheridan"	Next → "Review"
- The Bear season 1

"Ceres" is the sixth episode of the first season of the American comedy-drama television series The Bear. It is the sixth overall episode of the series and was written by Catherine Schetina & Rene Gube and directed by Joanna Calo. It was released on Hulu on June 23, 2022, along with the rest of the season.

== Plot ==
The episode opens with a flashback set in a home kitchen: Mikey (Jon Bernthal) and Carmy prepare Mikey's braciole while Carmy, Sugar (Abby Elliott), and Richie (Ebon Moss-Bachrach) listen to Mikey tell a story.

In the present timeline, Sydney develops a cola-braised short ribs and risotto meal for an upcoming dinner menu. Carmy says it is tremendous but not ready yet, and that she's talented but impatient. Sydney serves it to a customer anyway. Natalie comes to the restaurant to figure out the restaurant's unpaid taxes and she and Carmy search for the missing documents. Marcus continues to work hard on developing donuts, but finds himself behind on restaurant work. Carmy and Natalie fight about how they're dealing with their grief and agree they want consistency from the restaurant. The restaurant has its windows shot out by stray gunfire, and Richie asks the local gangsters to find out who did it. Later, the gangsters get into a scuffle, which Sydney breaks up by offering them leftovers. All the Beef staff are feeling motivated and organized but Richie is still being chaotic and distracting. Tina tells him he needs to get with it and he considers quitting. Richie feels left out and unneeded because of Sydney's success and it's implied that he calls the police on the gangsters.

== Production ==
=== Development ===
"Ceres" was written by Catherine Schetina & Rene Gube.

=== Casting ===
Ebon Moss-Bachrach was largely responsible for Jon Bernthal agreeing to play the role of Mikey, who makes his first onscreen appearance in "Ceres". Moss-Bachrach asked nicely, and the two actors are old friends, having first worked together in 2003 when Bernthal was understudy to Moss-Bachrach and two other cast members for an off-Broadway play, Lanford Wilson's Fifth of July.

=== Costuming ===
For the flashback, designer Courtney Wheeler put Carmy in a "gray long-sleeved henley to signal relaxed, happier times for the family [because] 'Michael is cooking this meal every Sunday, and maybe the Bears game is on.'"

=== Filming ===
The flashback with Mikey was filmed in California, in the kitchen of one of the producers of the show. According to Moss-Bachrach, "Jon's scene was the last thing we shot, so we were able to change our appearance a little bit...Jon was in the middle of doing American Gigolo and we could only really get him for a day. A few of us went out to L.A., and we shot it there, so the whole temperature was quite different, the light was different. It felt not so dark, in a way."

=== Music ===
The songs included in the episode were "Call the Police" by LCD Soundsystem, "Beat City" by the Flowerpot Men, "Peace Blossom Boogy" by Babe Rainbow, "Aphasia" by the Budos Band, and "Last Train Home" by John Mayer. Chris Storer explained the use of "Beat City" by saying that "Richie is a character really dealing with what life is like without not only his boss, but his best friend. And you multiply that by the fact that there is a smaller version of his best friend, Carmy, fighting with him all day long. You see that Richie's this guy that's facing what the world is like 10 years too late, after he has been cooped up in this restaurant. We wanted some of the music in these moments with Richie to feel like they were a little bit stuck in time. And we kept thinking, 'Richie probably thinks about Ferris Bueller's Day Off a lot.' He would totally have this song on a playlist. By the way, when you hear the song independent from Ferris Bueller, it's incredible. The Ferris Bueller soundtrack is fucking unbelievable."

== Reception ==
=== Critical reviews ===
Vulture rated "Ceres" five out of five stars.

Den of Geek hailed Bernthal's debut appearance a crucial to the long-term overall emotional impact of The Bear: "The Bear has been great from its first episode on. But it didn't fully become the best version of itself until season 1 episode 6 'Ceres,' in which Mikey is first introduced via flashback. As Mikey attends to the Berzatto family dinner and enthralls his siblings with a story that they've all heard a thousand times, the melancholy at the center of the story firmly locks into place and is never dislodged. Every character on The Bear makes more sense when you remember what they've lost. Even Syd, who never knew Mikey, has to confront his shade within Carmy's baby blue eyes every day."

=== Accolades ===
Award	Category	Nominee(s)	Result	Ref.
Primetime Emmy Awards	Outstanding Supporting Actor in a Comedy Series	Ebon Moss-Bachrach	Won	
