= The Bear season 1 =

Season of television series

The Bear
- Season 1
- Promotional poster
- Showrunners: Christopher Storer; Joanna Calo
- Starring: Jeremy Allen White; Ebon Moss-Bachrach; Ayo Edebiri; Lionel Boyce; Liza Colón-Zayas; Abby Elliott
- No. of episodes: 8

Release
- Original network: FX on Hulu
- Original release: June 23, 2022

Season chronology
- Next → Season 2

The first season of the American comedy-drama television series The Bear premiered with all episodes on June 23, 2022, on FX on Hulu. Christopher Storer and Joanna Calo serve as showrunners for the season. Jeremy Allen White stars as Carmy Berzatto, an award-winning chef who returns to his hometown of Chicago to manage the chaotic kitchen at his deceased brother's sandwich shop. The supporting cast includes Ebon Moss-Bachrach, Ayo Edebiri, Lionel Boyce, Liza Colón-Zayas, and Abby Elliott.

In March 2021, FX ordered a pilot for The Bear to be written and directed by Storer, and the series was given a full season order in October 2021. Filming for the season began in February 2022 in Chicago, and wrapped in March of that year. The season consists of eight episodes.

The season received critical acclaim. It received ten Primetime Emmy Awards, including Outstanding Comedy Series and acting wins for White, Moss-Bachrach, and Edebiri, making it the season of television with the most wins in a single year for a comedy series until the record was beaten by the series' second season. The season was the most-watched comedy series in FX's history.

== Cast and characters ==
=== Main ===
- Jeremy Allen White as Carmen "Carmy" Berzatto
- Ebon Moss-Bachrach as Richard "Richie" Jerimovich
- Ayo Edebiri as Sydney Adamu
- Lionel Boyce as Marcus Brooks
- Liza Colón-Zayas as Tina Marrero
- Abby Elliott as Natalie "Sugar" Berzatto

=== Recurring ===
- Matty Matheson as Neil Fak
- Jon Bernthal as Michael "Mikey" Berzatto
- Joel McHale as David Fields
- Edwin Lee Gibson as Ebraheim
- Corey Hendrix as Gary "Sweeps" Woods
- Oliver Platt as Jimmy "Cicero" Kalinowski
- José Cervantes as Angel, a dishwasher at The Beef
- Richard Esteras as Manny, a dishwasher at The Beef
- Chris Witaske as Pete, Natalie's earnest and buoyant husband

=== Guest ===
- Christopher Zucchero as Chi-Chi (Note: Zucchero is erroneously credited in season 1's "Hands" and "Brigade" but does not appear in those episodes.)
- Carmen Christopher as Chester
- Gillian Jacobs as Tiffany "Tiff" Jerimovich (uncredited) (Note: Though uncredited, Jacobs also provided Tiffany's voice when Richie reaches her voicemail in season 1's "Braciole".)
- Amy Morton as Nancy Chore
- Molly Ringwald as Al-Anon meeting facilitator

== Episodes ==
No. overall	No. in season	Title	Directed by	Written by	Original release date	Prod. code
1	1	"System"	Christopher Storer	Christopher Storer	June 23, 2022	XCBV1001
In the summer of 2022, James Beard Award-winning chef Carmen "Carmy" Berzatto returns home to Chicago to manage The Original Beef of Chicagoland, a rundown River North restaurant owned by his brother Michael, who recently died by suicide. His brother's best friend, Richie Jerimovich, and the stubborn staff resist Carmy's efforts to modernize the restaurant. Carmy hires Culinary Institute of America-trained chef and Chicago native Sydney Adamu, who wants to help him fix the restaurant because it was her father's favorite.
2	2	"Hands"	Christopher Storer	Christopher Storer	June 23, 2022	XCBV1002
In a flashback, Carmy works at a fine dining restaurant in New York City where his boss verbally abuses him. In the present, Carmy attempts to overhaul the menu as he faces continued resistance from the staff members who fail to show him respect. Carmy's sister, Natalie "Sugar" Berzatto, attempts to help but struggles to connect with him. After a health inspector discovers multiple safety and sanitation issues, the restaurant is given a "C" rating. Carmy discovers how poorly the restaurant has been managed, and that his brother owed $300,000 to their family friend, Jimmy (referred to as "Uncle Cicero"). Cicero offers to buy the restaurant from Carmy, who refuses the offer but promises to pay back his brother's loan. Sydney wants to be paid as a proper sous-chef. Richie reveals to Sydney that Michael wouldn't allow Carmy to work in the restaurant when he was younger and that he shot himself in the head four months earlier.
3	3	"Brigade"	Joanna Calo	Christopher Storer	June 23, 2022	XCBV1003
Carmy attends an Al-Anon meeting in an attempt to better understand his brother's struggles with addiction. At the restaurant, he introduces a brigade de cuisine-style kitchen and relies on the ill-prepared and increasingly frustrated Sydney to manage it. After initial failures, the staff begins to connect to their new roles – particularly Marcus, the passionate baker. Sydney confronts Carmy about being missing most of the day after not listening to her reservations about the new hierarchy. Carmy agrees that they need to collaborate and listen to each other if the business is going to succeed.
4	4	"Dogs"	Christopher Storer	Sofya Levitsky-Weitz	June 23, 2022	XCBV1004
Carmy and Richie cater a children's birthday party for Cicero. Carmy creates homemade Ecto cooler, which is accidentally spiked with Richie's Xanax, causing the children to fall asleep in the yard. When Carmy tells Cicero about the Xanax, Cicero responds that he actually doesn't mind the quiet. Meanwhile, Sydney butts heads but eventually bonds with the restaurant staff and begins to earn their respect. Marcus becomes passionate about his new chocolate cake program.
5	5	"Sheridan"	Joanna Calo	Karen Joseph Adcock	June 23, 2022	XCBV1005
To try to increase profits, Carmy and Sydney agree to create a new dinner menu. As they prepare to open for lunch, a toilet backs up. Carmy calls Fak, Richie's friend, to fix it. Fak wants to be an employee but his informal interview with Richie culminates in a fight which Carmy breaks up. Fak reveals that Richie has been selling cocaine in the alley behind the restaurant; Richie explains that this got the business through the COVID-19 pandemic but agrees to stop. Marcus experiments with fermentation, but neglects his baking duties. As he rushes to catch up, he overloads the mixer and causes a fuse to blow. With the power out, the crew scramble to save their perishables. When Fak informs Carmy it will cost over $5,000 to replace a damaged condenser, he asks Richie to get the money by selling cocaine one final time. Sydney saves the day by running an outdoor lunch service using a makeshift barbecue setup, causing her to reflect on her failed catering business.
6	6	"Ceres"	Joanna Calo	Catherine Schetina & Rene Gube	June 23, 2022	XCBV1006
Sydney develops a risotto meal for an upcoming dinner menu, but Carmy rejects it; Sydney serves it to a customer anyway. Natalie comes to the restaurant to figure out the restaurant's unpaid taxes and she and Carmy search for the missing documents. Marcus continues to work hard on developing donuts but finds himself behind on restaurant work. The restaurant has its windows shot out by stray gunfire, and Richie asks the local gangsters to find out who did it. Later, the gangsters get into a scuffle, which Sydney breaks up by offering them leftovers; Richie feels left out and unneeded because of Sydney's success and calls the police on the gangsters.
7	7	"Review"	Christopher Storer	Joanna Calo	June 23, 2022	XCBV1007
Ebraheim reads aloud a very positive review of the restaurant, which especially mentions the risotto that Sydney served to a food critic. Tina's son gets suspended from school and she brings him to the restaurant to learn culinary skills. Just before the lunch rush, the team learns that Sydney left the preorder option active on their newly computerized to-go service, generating more orders than they can fill. Carmy gets angry with Sydney and Marcus. Sydney accidentally stabs Richie in the chaos and announces her immediate resignation as Carmy begins to mentally deteriorate.
8	8	"Braciole"	Christopher Storer	Christopher Storer & Joanna Calo	June 23, 2022	XCBV1008
Carmy attends an Al-Anon meeting and shares that he started in the restaurant business because his brother didn't let him work at The Beef. Sydney and Marcus meet at her apartment and discuss their futures after they both quit due to Carmy's outburst. The Beef hosts a bachelor party, where a fight breaks out and Richie is arrested for nearly killing a guest. The man recovers and Richie is charged with aggravated assault. Marcus returns to work and Carmy apologizes. Carmy accidentally starts a stove fire and takes no action, and the other chefs extinguish it. Richie gives Carmy a letter left to him by Michael, which includes a spaghetti recipe with the direction to use smaller cans of tomatoes because they taste better. Carmy opens one of the cans and finds hundred-dollar bills hidden inside; they close the restaurant for the day, open all of the cans, and find more hidden money. Sydney returns after Carmy sends her a text with an apology and suggestions for improvements to her risotto dish. Carmy hangs a sign announcing that The Beef is closed and that a new restaurant called The Bear will be opening soon.

== Production ==
=== Development ===
FX ordered a pilot for The Bear in March 2021, to be written and directed by series creator and co-showrunner Christopher Storer. In October 2021, FX greenlit the series for a full-season order, scheduled for a 2022 premiere date. The season was produced by FX Productions (FXP), with Hiro Murai, Nate Matteson, Joanna Calo and Josh Senior serving as executive producers. Matty Matheson, who portrays Neil Fak in a recurring role in the season, serves as a consulting producer. The sandwich shop interior is copied from the Chicago restaurant Mr. Beef on Orleans Street, in River North. Storer was a frequent patron and a friend of the owner's son.

=== Casting ===
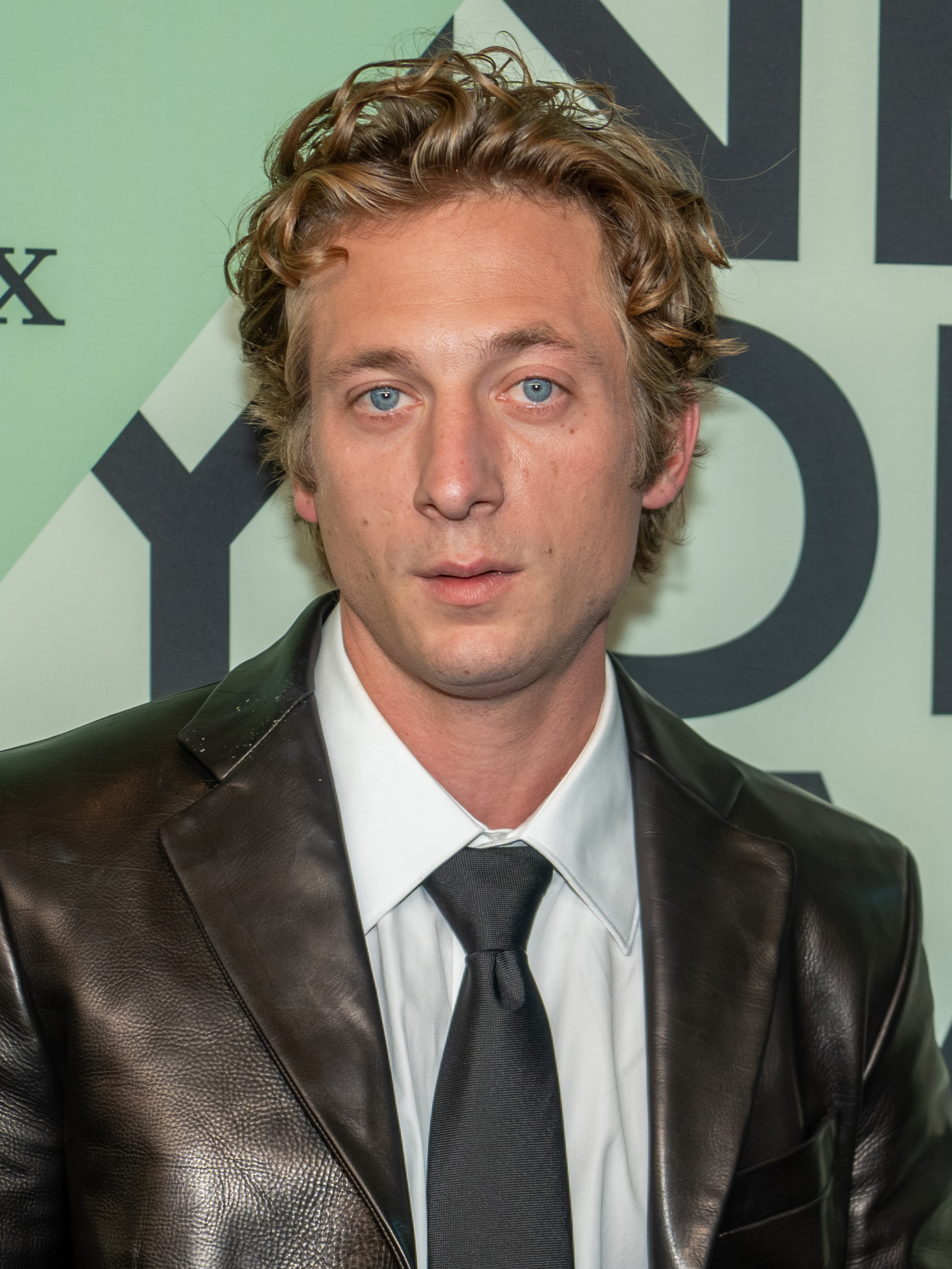
Jeremy Allen White portrays chef Carmy Berzatto in the series.

On May 21, 2021, it was announced that Shameless star Jeremy Allen White would be starring in the pilot for The Bear in the leading role, alongside co-stars Ebon Moss-Bachrach, Ayo Edebiri, Lionel Boyce, Abby Elliott and Matheson. In October 2021, Liza Colón-Zayas was announced to be joining the main cast, with Matheson and Edwin Lee Gibson starring in a recurring capacity. The season features many guest stars, including Oliver Platt, Joel McHale and Jon Bernthal. Joanna Calo told The Hollywood Reporter after the launch of season one, "We were looking for surprising people, the most exciting people, and people with kindness at their center as a way to ground some of the sharper edges of the show. And Lionel [Boyce] and Ayo [Edebiri] were people Chris had worked with in different ways. And Ebon [Moss-Bachrach] was someone that we both really admired and kind of just found through the casting process. All the people that we cast were willing to read, which was a really interesting process to navigate. And that wasn't even about them, showing us how good they were, we knew how good they were. But it was a way for us to meet them and talk to them and see if they wanted to work with us and see if they kind of could have a shared energy."

=== Writing ===
Storer wrote four of the eight episodes, and co-showrunner Joanna Calo wrote two. The rest of the episodes were written by Sofya Levitsky-Weitz, Karen Joseph Adcock, Catherine Schetina and Rene Gube. The scripts for all the episodes in the season were submitted to the Writers Guild of America on May 6, 2022.

According to Calo, "One of the things that changed greatly ended up not being put into the final pilot. We wrote a big explosion for Jeremy [Allen White], getting at this thing that happens in kitchens, which is that the hot temperatures and the close quarters and the abusive cycles often lead chefs to yell at each other. There was this big moment for Jeremy to freak out at everyone. If you've seen the series, there are moments like that later on. When we made the pilot, we decided that we were able to draw that out for longer, but I do think that it showed FX what Jeremy could do and what the show could be. And that was something exciting to them. And also Sydney [Adamu] was supposed to appear first in episode three. And I loved her and I said, 'let's get her in.'"

Season 1 covers the period from June 2022 to January 2023. The pilot is clearly set in the summertime. In "Hands," Richie tells Syd that Mikey's February suicide was "four months ago." "Brigade" takes place in November 2022. The events of "Review" and "Braciole" (and possibly "Ceres") take place back-to-back. There is no straightforward evidence of the date included in most of season 1, but in the season 4 episode "Groundhogs," Carmy sends a text message to dead Mikey's dead phone. Older text messages are visible, including one dated to Saturday, January 21, 2023, at 4:03 p.m. that reads, "Found the tomato cans."

=== Costuming ===
Courtney Wheeler did the costume design for episodes two through eight of season 1, taking over from Cristina Spiridakis, who costumed the pilot episode. Carmy's fuzzy block-patterned jacket is a Gael 8267 jacket by NN.07. Producer Chris Storer originally envisioned Carmy wearing a navy pea coat but White gravitated to the earth-toned piece from the Danish brand. For much of season 1 Sydney's work shirt is a "classic Thom Browne button-front." The aprons that Carmy hands out to the staff to visually unify the crew are the Travail style of bib apron from a French brand called Bragard. The season 1 aprons were surplus, purchased from the French Laundry restaurant after they were rejected for being the incorrect shade of blue. Tina and Richie refuse to wear the blues until the season finale; Tina's Mrs. Always Right apron came from Amazon.com.

=== Filming ===
Several scenes for the pilot were filmed on location at Mr. Beef, although a set was built for the kitchen scenes. The pilot was filmed in summer 2021. Principal photography for the season began in February 2022, and wrapped on March 31, 2022, in Chicago. Storer directed five of the eight episodes, with the other three being directed by Calo. The seventh episode of the season, "Review," features an 18-minute long take.

According to cinematographer Andrew Wehde, episodes two through eight of season one were shot over 27 days (two fewer days than had been scheduled) with "about 18 days in that primary set [at Cinespace Chicago], and then we were out at the original Mr. Beef and elsewhere around the city for the remaining eight or nine days." The pilot was "shot widescreen, 2:39." According to Wehde, "We started realizing the pilot lived in its own world. The show was going to be its own thing. We shot tests before principal [photography] of season one, and we were pulling grabs of widescreen and 1:85. It started to feel timeless at 1:85. We felt 1:85 worked great." He told Panavision.com in 2022 about the set constructed for filming episodes 2 through 8 of season 1:

We did an entire interactive lighting setup on the stage so that every single light in the restaurant—whether it was back of the kitchen, front of the kitchen, or the dining room—was a full RGB LED, controlled by our dimmer-board operator. We never brought any lights onto the set, so we never had to wait for things, and there were no C-stands or movie lights in the way. It was all practical-based lighting. And outside of the stage, we had about 10 old-school 18K tungsten lights to give us the rich, warm light coming into the restaurant. We also built the entire stage so the dolly could run without track or dance floor...Every stove, every oven, every refrigerator—they call them low boys, which are the fridges underneath the counters—the bakery, even the soda machines worked.

Storer told one interviewer that the challenges of shooting in the tight confines of the kitchen had them watching submarine films like Das Boot and Crimson Tide.

=== Editing ===
Chris Storer encouraged Joanna Naugle to watch the 1999 Martin Scorsese film Bringing Out the Dead to prepare for editing season 1. According to film editor Adam Epstein, "We were blessed-slash-cursed with an absolutely massive amount of B-roll...We had six hours of them doing the full beef process, or four hours of Chicago at dusk, and at night. We had shots of the kitchen when it was messy, and when it was clean. It was really purposeful and specific, and that enabled us to bring some interesting ideas and transitions into the episodes." Naugle told Gold Derby, "[The actors] have a lot of that intensity and overlap already happening on set and then we just try to find ways to ramp it up...it was really exciting to be able to take out basically any breath so that at any moment you hear at least two voices, sometimes three, and just making it feel like you're in the kitchen with them listening to the chaos and going along for the ride."

=== Sound design ===
According to supervising sound editor Steve "Major" Giammaria, season one is loud by design, so the key issue was how to focus through the noise for the audience: "Often there's a song playing as score, multiple people yelling, and production sound that includes pots and pans and working stoves tied to the dialogue as well as added foley and sound FX. The trick then becomes what to focus on at each moment."

=== Music ===
The songs used in the season 1 trailer are "Three Way Split" by Dick Walter and "Via Chicago" by Wilco.

Josh Senior told Uproxx, "We did the music for the show on Saturdays. We would shoot during the week and edit. And then on Saturdays, Chris and I would text each other songs that we would then play over cuts that didn't have music, or had different music in it."

Executive producer Josh Senior and composer Jeffrey Qaiyum first met when Qaiyum taught a hip-hop theater class at Lehigh University. Senior then began hiring him for various production projects, leading up to The Bear. Qaiyum, in turn, brought in Johnny Iguana: "I use session musicians when scoring and I wanted to use only Chicago people for The Bear. Johnny Iguana is one of the greatest piano/organ players alive. He's a Chicago legend and has played in the Junior Wells band and was quite big regionally with a band called Oh My God. His current band is the Claudettes. I used Johnny Iguana a lot in season one and when we were discussing the vibe for season two, I got him involved in a more official capacity and we co-wrote many of the themes for S2." In season one, they served, in part, as musical adjuncts to the low-budget operation. According to Block Club Chicago, "Qaiyum and Iguana were often asked to compose music with similar tones and beats per minute to popular songs the show's producers wanted to use but couldn't afford."

== Release ==
The season released on FX on Hulu in the United States on June 23, 2022, with all eight episodes. Internationally, the season became available to stream in the Star hub on Disney+.

== Reception ==
=== Audience viewership ===
The first season of The Bear was the most watched program during the week of July 22, 2022, and the second-most-watched program across all platforms during the weeks of July 3, and July 13, and July 17, 2022. According to FX, the first season was the most-watched comedy series in the network's history.

=== Critical response ===
The first season received an approval rating of 100% with an average rating of 8.7/10, based on 80 critic reviews on the review aggregator website Rotten Tomatoes. The website's critics consensus reads, "Like an expertly confected sandwich, The Bear assembles a perfect melange of ingredients and stacks them for optimal satisfaction—and thankfully keeps the crust-iness for extra flavor." Metacritic gave the season a weighted average score of 88 out of 100 based on 24 critic reviews.

The American Film Institute named the first season one of the ten best television programs of the year. The Guardian named the season number one of the best 100 TV shows of 2022, describing it as "the best workplace drama since Mad Men". The Bear appeared in the top ten on numerous publications' "Best of 2022" lists, including first for The A.V. Club, BBC, People, and TVLine, among others.

=== Accolades ===
The season received critical acclaim, with multiple awards nominations and wins. The season won ten Primetime Emmy Awards for its 13 nominations, making it the season of television with the most wins in a single year for a comedy series, until the record was beaten by the series' second season. The following is a list of awards the first season of The Bear has been nominated for or won.

Year	Award	Category	Nominee(s)	Result	Ref.
2022	American Film Institute Awards	Top 10 Programs of the Year	The Bear	Won (Note: This award does not have a single winner, but recognizes multiple programs.)	
2022	Gotham Awards	Outstanding Performance in a New Series	Ayo Edebiri	Nominated	
2022	People's Choice Awards	Favorite Bingeworthy Show of 2022	The Bear	Nominated	
2023	AACTA International Awards	Best Drama Series	The Bear	Nominated	
2023	AACTA International Awards	Best Actor in a Series	Jeremy Allen White	Nominated	
2023	American Film Institute Awards	Top 10 Television Programs	The Bear	Won	
2023	Astra TV Awards	Best Streaming Series, Comedy	The Bear	Nominated	
2023	Astra TV Awards	Best Actor in a Streaming Series, Comedy	Jeremy Allen White	Won	
2023	Astra TV Awards	Best Supporting Actor in a Streaming Series, Comedy	Ebon Moss-Bachrach	Nominated	
2023	Astra TV Awards	Best Supporting Actress in a Streaming Series, Comedy	Ayo Edebiri	Won (Note: Tied with Christina Ricci for Wednesday.)	
2023	Astra TV Awards	Best Directing in a Streaming Series, Comedy	Christopher Storer (for "Review")	Nominated	
2023	Astra TV Awards	Best Writing in a Streaming Series, Comedy	Christopher Storer (for "System")	Won	
2023	Astra Creative Arts TV Awards	Best Casting in a Comedy Series	The Bear	Nominated	
2023	Astra Creative Arts TV Awards	Best Guest Actor in a Comedy Series	Jon Bernthal	Nominated	
2023	Black Reel Television Awards	Outstanding Supporting Performance, Comedy Series	Ayo Edebiri	Nominated	
2023	British Academy Television Awards	Best International Programme	The Bear	Nominated	
2023	Cinema Audio Society Awards	Outstanding Achievement in Sound Mixing for Television Series – Half Hour	Scott D. Smith, Steve Giammaria, Patrick Christensen, Ryan Collison, Connor Nagy (for "Review")	Nominated	
2023	Critics' Choice Awards	Best Comedy Series	The Bear	Nominated	
2023	Critics' Choice Awards	Best Actor in a Comedy Series	Jeremy Allen White	Won	
2023	Critics' Choice Awards	Best Supporting Actress in a Comedy Series	Ayo Edebiri	Nominated	
2023	Directors Guild of America Awards	Outstanding Directorial Achievement in Comedy Series	Christopher Storer (for "Review")	Nominated	
2023	Dorian TV Awards	Best TV Comedy	The Bear	Nominated	
2023	Dorian TV Awards	Best Supporting TV Performance – Comedy	Ayo Edebiri	Won	
2023	Golden Globe Awards	Best Television Series – Musical or Comedy	The Bear	Nominated	
2023	Golden Globe Awards	Best Actor in a Television Series – Musical or Comedy	Jeremy Allen White	Won	
2023	Golden Reel Awards	Outstanding Achievement in Sound Editing – Broadcast Short Form	Steve "Major" Giammaria, Jonathan Fuhrer, Evan Benjamin, Annie Taylor, Leslie Bloome (for "Review")	Won	
2023	Independent Spirit Awards	Best New Scripted Series	The Bear	Won	
2023	Independent Spirit Awards	Best Supporting Performance in a New Scripted Series	Ayo Edebiri	Won	
2023	Independent Spirit Awards	Best Supporting Performance in a New Scripted Series	Ebon Moss-Bachrach	Nominated	
2023	Primetime Emmy Awards	Outstanding Comedy Series	The Bear	Won	
2023	Primetime Emmy Awards	Outstanding Lead Actor in a Comedy Series	Jeremy Allen White (for "Braciole")	Won	
2023	Primetime Emmy Awards	Outstanding Supporting Actor in a Comedy Series	Ebon Moss-Bachrach (for "Ceres")	Won	
2023	Primetime Emmy Awards	Outstanding Supporting Actress in a Comedy Series	Ayo Edebiri (for "Review")	Won	
2023	Primetime Emmy Awards	Outstanding Directing for a Comedy Series	Christopher Storer (for "Review")	Won	
2023	Primetime Emmy Awards	Outstanding Writing for a Comedy Series	Christopher Storer (for "System")	Won	
2023	Primetime Creative Arts Emmy Awards	Outstanding Guest Actor in a Comedy Series	Jon Bernthal (for "Braciole")	Nominated	
2023	Primetime Creative Arts Emmy Awards	Outstanding Guest Actor in a Comedy Series	Oliver Platt (for "Dogs")	Nominated	
2023	Primetime Creative Arts Emmy Awards	Outstanding Production Design for a Narrative Program (Half-Hour)	Sam Lisenco, Eric Dean, and Emily Carte (for "System")	Nominated	
2023	Primetime Creative Arts Emmy Awards	Outstanding Casting for a Comedy Series	Jeanie Bacharach, Jennifer Rudnicke, Mickie Paskal, AJ Links	Won	
2023	Primetime Creative Arts Emmy Awards	Outstanding Picture Editing for a Single-Camera Comedy Series	Joanna Naugle (for "System")	Won	
2023	Primetime Creative Arts Emmy Awards	Outstanding Sound Editing for a Comedy or Drama Series (Half-Hour) and Animation	Steve "Major" Giammaria, Evan Benjamin, Jonathan Fuhrer, Annie Taylor, Chris White, Leslie Bloome, Shaun Brennan (for "Review")	Won	
2023	Primetime Creative Arts Emmy Awards	Outstanding Sound Mixing for a Comedy or Drama Series (Half-Hour) and Animation	Steve "Major" Giammaria, Scott D. Smith (for "Review")	Won	
2023	Producers Guild of America Awards	Outstanding Producer of Episodic Television, Comedy	The Bear	Won	
2023	Satellite Awards	Best Drama Series	The Bear	Nominated	
2023	Satellite Awards	Best Actor in a Drama / Genre Series	Jeremy Allen White	Nominated	
2023	Set Decorators Society of America Awards	Best Achievement in Décor/Design of a Half-Hour Single-Camera Series	Eric Frankel, Merje Veski	Nominated	
2023	Screen Actors Guild Awards	Outstanding Performance by an Ensemble in a Comedy Series	Lionel Boyce, Liza Colón-Zayas, Ayo Edebiri, Abby Elliott, Edwin Lee Gibson, Corey Hendrix, Matty Matheson, Ebon Moss-Bachrach, and Jeremy Allen White	Nominated	
2023	Screen Actors Guild Awards	Outstanding Performance by a Male Actor in a Comedy Series	Jeremy Allen White	Won	
2023	Television Critics Association Awards	Program of the Year	The Bear	Nominated	
2023	Television Critics Association Awards	Outstanding New Program	The Bear	Won	
2023	Television Critics Association Awards	Outstanding Achievement in Comedy	The Bear	Won	
2023	Television Critics Association Awards	Individual Achievement in Comedy	Ayo Edebiri	Nominated	
2023	Television Critics Association Awards	Individual Achievement in Comedy	Jeremy Allen White	Nominated	
2023	Writers Guild of America Awards	Comedy Series	Karen Joseph Adcock, Joanna Calo, Rene Gube, Sofya Levitsky-Weitz, Alex O'Keefe, Catherine Schetina, Christopher Storer	Won	
2023	Writers Guild of America Awards	New Series	Karen Joseph Adcock, Joanna Calo, Rene Gube, Sofya Levitsky-Weitz, Alex O'Keefe, Catherine Schetina, Christopher Storer	Nominated	
2023	Writers Guild of America Awards	Episodic Comedy	Joanna Calo and Christopher Storer (for "Braciole")	Nominated	

== Sources ==
- Di Maio, Cristina (2025). "New Italian American Fathering in the Time of the Gig Economy: The Case of The Bear". Diasporic Italy: Journal of the Italian American Studies Association. 5. Champaign, Illinois: University of Illinois Press: 105–121. doi:10.5406/27697738.05.1.08. ISSN 2769-772X. OCLC 1267410841.
