= Vicky Bennison =

British writer and documentarian

- Born: c. 1959; Kenya
- Occupations: Documentarian, writer
- Notable work: Pasta Grannies

Vicky Bennison (b. c. 1959) is a documentarian and cookbook writer, responsible for the Pasta Grannies YouTube channel, which preserves the heritage pasta traditions of Italian home cooks.

Born in Kenya to British parents and raised in Botswana, Bennison described herself in a 2022 interview as having a expatriate upbringing. Bennison earned a B.S. in zoology from Newcastle University and an MBA from the University of Bath, before working as a management consultant in international development, working in Siberia, South Africa, Kazakhstan, and Turkmenistan. She later became a professional food and travel writer, publishing in La Cucina Italiana, The Telegraph, and Food & Wine.

She started interviewing and filming Italian "pasta grannies" in the 2010s, launching her YouTube channel in 2015, documenting more than 400 home cooks by 2023. As described by The New York Times in 2019, "Videos are shot in home kitchens and side yards, with minimal styling and natural light. The subtitles are utilitarian, and the music...noncommittal...No one measures anything, but Ms. Bennison does her best to fill in the blanks with instructive narration."

Bennison does initial research on regional pasta styles and then finds individual subjects through a network that includes a staffer she describes as a "granny finder," Livia De Giovanni who lives in Faenza. Her videographer is Andrea Savorani Neri. In 2021 she gave a TED Talk called "Fettuccine and Feminism."

The Pasta Grannies Cookbook won a James Beard Foundation Book Award in 2020.

On the American TV series The Bear, Carmy Berzatto (Jeremy Allen White) falls asleep watching Pasta Grannies in episode two of season one, "Hands."
