= Carmy Berzatto =

Fictional character, The Bear TV series

- The Bear character
- Jeremy Allen White as Carmy Berzatto
- First appearance: "System"; June 23, 2022
- Last appearance: "The Original Beef of Chicagoland"; June 25, 2026
- Created by: Christopher Storer
- Portrayed by: Jeremy Allen White

In-universe information
- Full name: Carmen Anthony Berzatto
- Nicknames: Carmy; Carm; Chef; Jeff; Eleven Madison Park Dickhead; Bear; Jeffrey; Jefferson; Baby; Neph; Carmental; Lil Pimp; Pimp; Babybear
- Occupation: chef; restaurateur
- Family: Donna Berzatto (mother); Michael Berzatto (brother, deceased); Natalie Berzatto (sister)

Carmen Anthony Berzatto, typically called Carmy, Carm, or Bear, is a fictional character on the FX Network television series The Bear. Created by Christopher Storer and played by Jeremy Allen White, Carmy is a internationally acclaimed chef who returns home to Chicago to run his family's failing Italian beef sandwich restaurant after the death of his older brother. White has received multiple Emmy and Golden Globe awards for his performance.

== Casting ==
Series creator Christopher Storer had previously worked with Jeremy Allen White on The Rental (2020) and wanted him for the part.

== Reception ==
In 2025, Variety named White's work playing Carmy Berzatto as one of the 100 greatest TV acting performances of the 21st century.

== Career ==
Carmy is a talented young chef who inherits a low-class sandwich shop in the River North neighborhood of Chicago, Illinois, United States, from his recently deceased, drug-dependent brother Michael "Mikey" Berzatto (Jon Bernthal) and declares his intention to turn it into a respectable place of business run by adults...eventually. Carmy has been described as a prototypical prodigal son, with not a little "conquering hero" in him as well, such that "Carmy is greeted with ambivalence by the friends and family he left behind for the...pretensions of haute cuisine." Allen has stated that Carmy initially comes home without "much of an identity outside of his profession." He told GoldDerby.com in 2023 that his first impression of the character from reading the pilot script was that Carmy was "incredibly lonely and uncomfortable with himself, but also very determined and...very skilled in what he does." According to series creator Storer, finding the balance between heritage (for better or worse), and a more innovative but uncertain path forward is central to Carmy's story:

Where we are with food today is obviously very complicated and tricky. I think there's a lot of conversation right now about how sustainable some of the Michelin-style restaurants are, and how people are getting paid. All of those things go into what our characters are going through. Specifically Carmy, who has been trained in those worlds, and who is gifted. But he also loves the food that he grew up with, the food from his family. And look, I can tell you that I've eaten at some of the best restaurants in the world, and I've eaten at Mr. Beef in Chicago. And I think that Mr. Beef is better than some three-star Michelin restaurants I've been in.

Carmy is known as one of the great chefs of his age: "ambitious and creative, and...so gifted that nearly everyone who's ever eaten his food thinks it's among the best they've ever had"—such that "people are willing to forgive his flaws just to be in his presence, to absorb his knowledge." Carmy was trained at the French Laundry in California's Napa Valley, Noma in Copenhagen, Restaurant Daniel in New York, and by the fictional Michelin-starred Andrea Terry (Olivia Colman) at a fictionalized version of Chicago's own Ever. In 2024 a Food & Wine writer commented, "I think it's frustrating...[that] the only woman [who mentored Carmy] had to be invented, even if she's written excellently." Carmy is a past winner of Food & Wine's Best New Chef in very early adulthood, and in 2018 won a James Beard Foundation Award for his work at a restaurant called Fairest Creatures in Malibu, California. (Note: Fairest creatures is a phrase "with Biblical resonance" from the antanaclastic first line of William Shakespeare's Sonnet 1: "From fairest creatures we desire increase, That thereby beauty's rose might never die". Sonnet 1 is the first of a thematically linked set known as the "procreation sonnets," all of which treat time as a "comprehensive power" and center the poet's "friend" as subject to that power for better and worse, all while demanding that the poet, the friend, and the reader do their part to create the world anew, be it through sexual reproduction or creative genesis.) He did a stint at Eleven Madison Park in New York City. He has served as the chef de cuisine at the best restaurants in the country. He retained three stars at Michelin-awarded restaurants but has never been awarded a star in his own right. A satiric metacommentary review of the Bear restaurant in Chicago magazine nonetheless predicted that Carmy "is in the express lane, headed straight for his first Michelin star."

White's acquired-for-the-show knife skills are visibly good. According to The Bear culinary producers Courtney Storer and Brian Lockwood, White is an unusually quick study on culinary technique. Chef Berzatto is also a "resourceful businessman," albeit somewhat challenged by what appears to be dyscalculia; basic arithmetic, if not simple counting, eludes him entirely. He also likely has some mild degree of dyslexia but nothing to prevent him from amassing a dense collection of food and restaurant books, which according to a quasi-forensic examination by Food & Wine editors, show that Carmy is:

"...deeply steeped in French technique á la the Troisgros Brothers, Pierre Gagnaire, Jacques Maximin, Joël Robuchon, Jacques Pépin, Sébastien Bras, and their peers. It veers toward Scandinavian precision with a whole suite of René Redzepi tomes (though pastry chef Marcus keeps copies stashed out of harm's way on a shelf above his work station) and the works of Magnus Nilsson and Christian Puglisi. It trips into molecular whimsy via el Bulli, wends over to Japan to meditate on the methods of Masaharu Morimoto and Shizuo Tsuji; goes fancy Cali with 1988 F&W Best New Chef Thomas Keller, Alice Waters, and 2009 F&W Best New Chef Christopher Kostow; and finds soul and root in Italian and Italian American home cook fare as well as the works of African American scholars like Dr. Jessica B. Harris and Toni Tipton-Martin."

Foodies love eyeballing Carmy's book collection. Also visible in the apartment and the restaurant office are Black Power Kitchen (multiple copies), The Hungry Eye by Leonard Barkan, The Flavor Thesaurus, Gullah Geechee Home Cooking, The Edna Lewis Cookbook, Institut Paul Bocuse Gastronomique, and literally hundreds of other food books of various price points, in-print availability, and usefulness to a restaurant chef. He has collected a veritable canon of food writing, ranging from cult-following titles (Polpo: A Venetian Cookbook, the five-volume Modernist Bread) to philosophies of food production (Nose to Tail Eating: A Kind of British Cooking); books produced by his on-screen teachers, including Keller's The French Laundry Cookbook, are highlighted in seasons 3 and 4. A mass-market paperback edition of Anthony Bourdain's 2000 Kitchen Confidential surfaced at Carmy's mom's house in season 4 and drew comment. The shelving of the books has no rhyme or reason; one theory is that "Maybe the staff reshelves haphazardly. [Carmy's] quite generous with his knives. Maybe cookbooks too."

Carmy, who, during the course of his training, crossed continents and back again, brings a broadened, accepting, quietly sophisticated, worldview back home with him. He immediately begins referring to everyone at the Beef as chef, which places "individuals of different ethnicities, racial backgrounds, class positions, and even familial ties on equal professional footing. In this way, the kitchen becomes a microcosm of Chicago itself: structured by hierarchy yet simultaneously negotiating the complexities of inclusion, belonging, and shared labor across social difference." Per his sous chef Sydney, Carmy is "genuinely so, so good at what he does—he's one of the best in the world, like, without a doubt...He works really hard. And cares. Like, really cares, and wants things to be better than they are, himself included." At the end of season 4, Carmy quit as executive chef of the Bear, the restaurant he co-founded in his hometown of Chicago. According to White, "Carmy shed so much in that finale and came clean in so many ways. He's trying to do what he thinks is right or best." In the second episode of season 5, he admits to "overcompensating," seemingly in tacit acknowledgment of his excessive stunting in season 3. In the series finale episode, after 16 months of leadership under Carmy Berzatto, the family restaurant he reformed from sloppy sandwich bar to fine-dining destination (assisted by chef Sydney, the existing Beef staff, Faks, business manager sister Sugar, lawyer Pete, and investor uncles) is awarded two Michelin stars.

Luca compared Carmy to Michael Jordan in season 2, and himself to Scottie Pippen. At the end of season 5, Luca says that since Carmy's "out of the game," culinary championship-level play will be between him and Marcus. Carmy applies for an internship at an architecture firm, which one writer compared Michael Jordan's stint in minor-league baseball.

== Character development ==
In addition to cooking and running the business, Carmy navigates relationships with his sister Natalie Berzatto Katinsky, whom he calls Sugar (Abby Elliott), his late brother's best friend Richie Jerimovich (Ebon Moss-Bachrach), new-hire sous chef Sydney "Syd" Adamu (Ayo Edebiri), and the existing staff of the Beef, described as a "ragtag team of initially recalcitrant veteran cooks." The show, originally a hero's journey structured around the travails of stranger-comes-to-town Carmy, eventually reveals itself as an ensemble piece about "the need for love to drive the act of cooking, but also [the various ways] love makes itself known through such an act." Despite his character flaws, the terminally self-loathing Carmy is ultimately animated by love for his family, and thus, he (with partners Sydney, Richard, and Natalie) is largely successful in his attempts to create a hospitable environment at the Bear: "The people within its walls did not necessarily choose to come together, nor do they necessarily leave their baggage at the door. But they are never alone, and together they create an atmosphere of precision, pleasure, and unity that is difficult to replicate elsewhere or under different circumstances." Carmy reaps more than a few benefits of this himself, as "people heal in community and through the relationships they've built." Los Angeles Times television critic Robert Lloyd described Carmy as an "ailing but admirable" young man who is built around a "core of sadness" but "happily free of...arrogance, unkindness, substance abuse, sexual predation...He is secure in what he knows and honest with his employees, who do not always appreciate it." The staff of the Beef were all but raw recruits when Carmy arrived at the restaurant, but in direct contravention of the often-toxic chefs who trained them, Carmy and his partner Chef Sydney both recognized and cultivated "strength in the crew that [they] have, rather than focusing on their weaknesses." In 2026, White mentioned that the 1979 Bruce Springsteen song "The Ties That Bind" informed his performance in season 1.

By season 2, as Carmy invested heavily in staff development, the ways he nurtured, challenged, and impeded the various members of his "found family" were a major element of his character arc. For instance he paid to send Beef cooks to culinary school (tuition at the school depicted is $8,400), which one GQ writer and former restaurateur described as "maybe the most insane part" of season 2. In season 3, the Bear also sent Sweeps to "wine school" for sommelier training. Carmy seems to be "quite generous," giving Tina his own fancy chef's knife, and commissioning custom chef whites from fashion designer Thom Browne for his partner Sydney. At the same time, "the most immobile character of the second season is Carmen himself. Despite being aware of the trauma work still required for him to progress, he appears to be overly concerned with others, almost to the point of forgetting himself. This ultimately results in him and his pent-up emotions being stuck in a freezer." But to narrative purpose, because "in terms of Joseph Campbell's monomyth...the belly of the whale [is] where the true metamorphosis happens."

Carmy's insecurity and intermittent temper tantrums result in isolation for him and distress for his family and coworkers. As explained by White, "He has this real confidence, but also crippling insecurity at the same time, and the juxtaposition of those things I think I found really, really interesting." Some of Carmy's travails can be traced his dysfunctional upbringing as the neglected youngest child of an alcoholic mother, Donna (Jamie Lee Curtis), leaving him prone to workaholism, anxiety, panic attacks, imposter syndrome, and dissociation. Allen suggested in 2023 that "he's sort of addicted to the possibility of everything falling apart..." The sound editing team for The Bear commented in 2025 that "we usually try to take it panic attack by panic attack, because sometimes with Carmy, he's often alone when he's having a panic attack. It's a panic attack of loneliness."

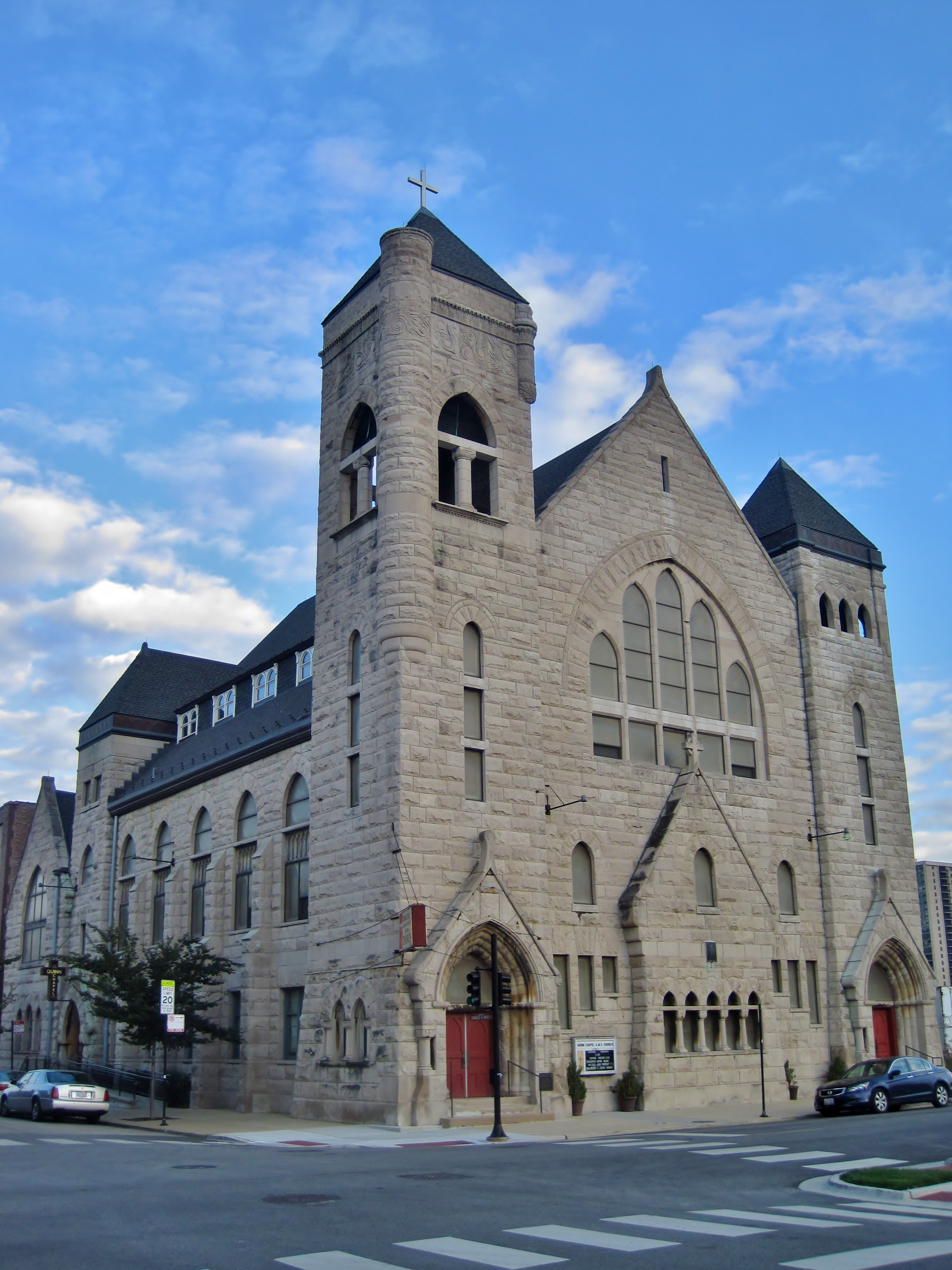
Carmy's season 1 Al-Anon meetings were filmed at Quinn Chapel AME Church in Bronzeville

Behaviors exhibited throughout the series and personal characteristics he mentions in a monologue at an Al-Anon meeting in season one (including difficulties paying attention, difficulties in school, and difficulties making friends) suggest to some viewers that Carmy should be categorized as a neurodivergent person. In season 5, Richie describes him as "differently abled." Some observers have asserted that Carmy exhibits symptoms of complex post-traumatic stress disorder (CPTSD). Plagued with perfectionism and unresolved grief over Mikey's suicide, Carmy compartmentalizes his feelings in favor of the grinding labor of the kitchen and periodically sabotages his own happiness in order to minimize his potential exposure to any emotion.

He had a pronounced stutter in childhood; verbal disfluency re-emerges in the adult Carmy when he is exposed to people or situations that remind him of the neglect and abuse of his youth. Naming and articulating his feelings, and speaking up for himself in the face of emotional manipulation, remain enduring challenges for Carmy; he "stutters and staggers" through interpersonal relationships, falling back on "I'm trying" when he fails to reveal himself or connect with his nearest and dearest. As a rule, Carmy cannot or will not talk much, preferring to show rather than tell. As White put it in 2023, he is "not a vocal person, not a great communicator." He has exacerbated his existing social struggles with a habit of viewing professional colleagues as competitors and threats to be defeated.

For its part, the show demonstrates that the mad genius is entirely dispensable if other members of the crew have been fully trained and amply empowered. Much of Carmy's counterproductive season 3 pursuit of a brittle sort of perfection seemingly stemmed from a mistaken belief that "if he can cook well enough, if he can be the best, then he can give the people he cares about what they need. And if he destroys himself in the process, then that only proves how much he loves them. Then, at least, he wouldn't feel like he failed them." The show deconstructs Carmy's messiah complex, instead emphasizing "the absurdity, and damage, of the auteur theory of anything—greatness is never a solitary achievement." A consistent and deeply sincere apologizer, by season 4, his transgressions against those closest to him have become too consistent for his apologies to hold much weight; Richie yelled in recrimination that "your sorries mean shit." Carmy does keep his promises to his staff: for instance, in the pilot he told Marcus he would get him a new mixer, and the Bear has a $14,000 Varimixer, and in the seasons 3 and 4 premiere episodes he promised the staff a Michelin star, and they got two.

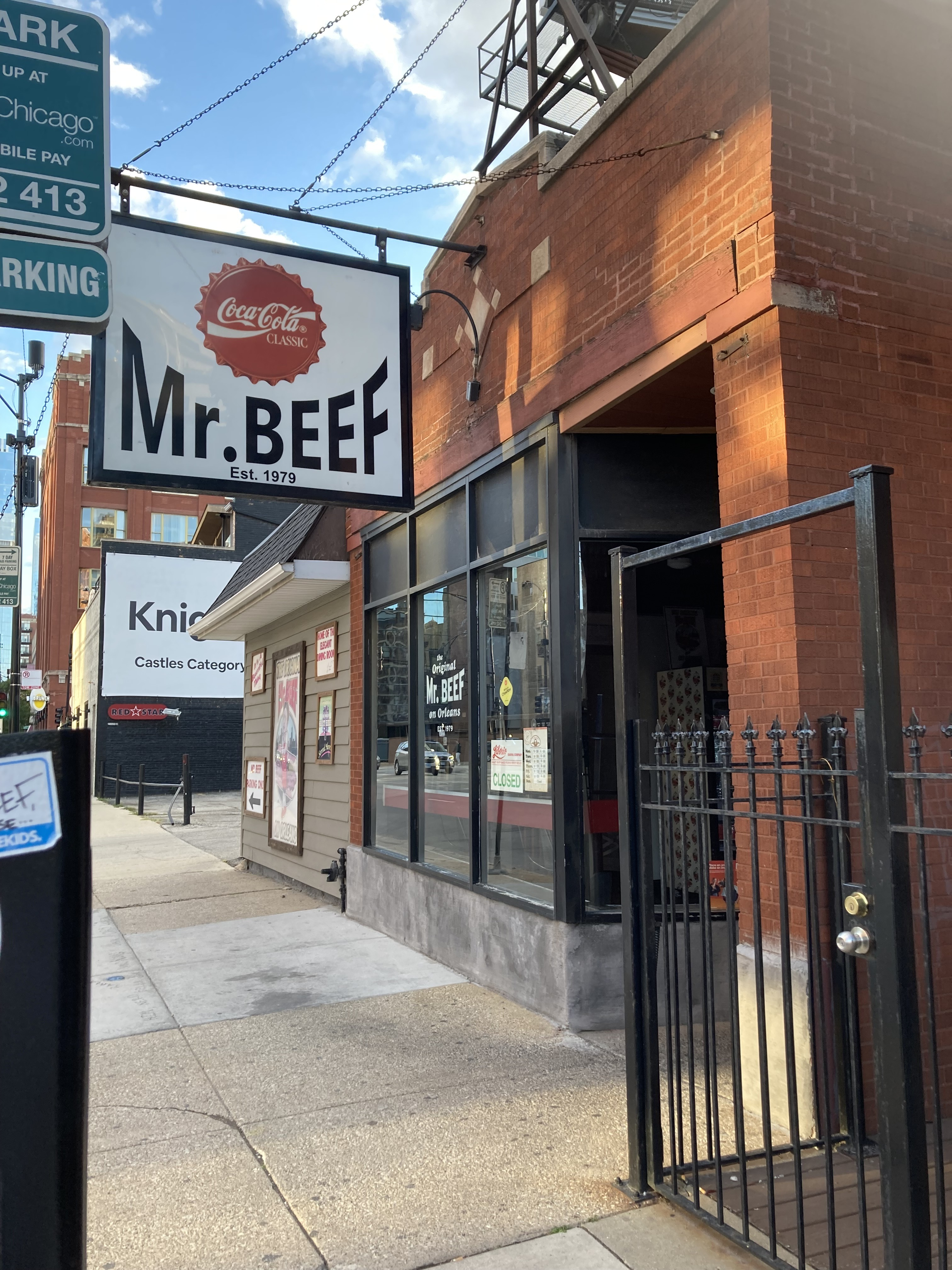
Mr. Beef in Chicago partially inspired the fictional Original Beef of Chicagoland restaurant depicted on The Bear

== Relationships ==
According to a Chicagoan writing in The New York Times Magazine, Carmy's decision to step out of the New York City fast lane to "dole out unglamorous sandwiches from a broken-nosed kind of shop" rewrites his career trajectory: "Carmy went back to Chicago because he had to. He stays because he wants to...the point is to do a great thing, for its own sake, alongside people you care about, without much concern for image or status. The Bear seems to see this as a very Chicago thing."

=== Natalie ===
Carmy and his surviving sibling, older sister Sugar, are quite close and have a warm, sensitive, funny relationship. "Shug," as he calls her, looks out for his emotional well-being and eventually gets involved in running the family restaurant, a business she had loathed when it was under Michael's management. According to White, Carmy often "feels incapable of reaching back, or being like, accepting" of Sugar's love, whereas Elliott has suggested that Sugar's expressiveness sometimes comes from a place of desperation, "like, 'Please don't leave me here with our family.'"

=== Richie ===
Richie and Carmy call each other cousin even though they are not biologically related. Richie was a long-time manager of the Beef alongside Mikey. He ran the place with "F-bomb-dropping, gun-toting swagger." Richie initially resented that the restaurant had been bequeathed to the long-absent Carmy instead of to him. Richie led the vanguard of the kitchen's opposition to Carmy's succession to his brother's throne; he declares that Carmy's years of nearly militaristic discipline and grueling labor have made him "pretentious, delusional, and a fucking sissy." According to White, despite their feuding within the restaurant, "For Carmy, Richie is the closest thing to Michael and vice versa. I think Carmy would have a hard time letting him go and I don't think that Richie would go willingly, either."

Carmy and his de facto foster brother, Richie, are prone to "emotional suppression and self-destruction...shouting matches and belittl[ing] one another," habits of toxic masculinity and patriarchy learned at home and at work. These behaviors hobble them individually and the functioning of the business generally, but they simultaneously encourage and enable the careers of their female partners. One rundown of The Bear characters prior to season four described Richie as "Carmy's arch-fremisis," a portmanteau constructed from frenemy and arch-nemesis. The Carmy–Richie fight club never seems to end, but when asked in 2025 by Interview magazine who would win a fight between Lip Gallagher of Shameless and Carmy of The Bear, Allen picked Lip, saying "Carmy doesn't want to fight anybody. He's all bark, no bite."

=== Claire ===
During season 2, Carmy had a sexual relationship with emergency room physician Claire (Molly Gordon) over the course of four or five episodes ("Pop" to "Omelette"), or six weeks. The pair first met as teenagers and have overlapping social circles. One season 2 reviewer commented, "...that storyline just doesn't get the attention it deserves. And besides, we already know that Carmy's real love is this restaurant, even if it does torture him. On some level, Claire's sporadic appearances prove that even Carmy knows that to be true." According to Grub Street, dating a chef can apparently be quite frustrating, in part because a "laser-focused, hypercompetitive kitchen addict is not necessarily able to become a different person when they come home, especially if they're exhausted." Chefs can be unpleasant critics of both home cooking and restaurant food, their schedules often do not leave much time for family events like weddings and holidays, and when they do come home, they often arrive "smelling like onions and fryer oil."

Carmy "personally serve[d] Claire and her friend as a kind gesture" at the restaurant's soft launch, but "his head [was] echoing with negative thoughts and terrible self-criticisms." Upon returning to the kitchen he seemingly retreated to the walk-in fridge to collect himself, and got locked inside because of the broken door handle. Service was a success without him, and Tina told Carmy that everyone was OK, but he was consumed with shame and guilt for not being present in the kitchen: "I failed you guys." Talking his way through it alone in the fridge, Carmy concluded that his personal relationships were at fault: "No amount of good is worth how terrible this feels." In the meantime, Carmy's T had been replaced on the other side of the door by Claire, who was disappointed in what she heard. She walked away, kissing cousin Richie a forlorn goodbye on the way. The New York Times described Claire as "never-quite-a-girlfriend." TIME described Claire, compared to Chef Adamu, as a "more obvious" candidate for an onscreen romance with Carmen. While doing publicity for season 5, when asked about Claire and Carmy, White said, "I'm rooting for everybody. I'm a fan of everybody."

=== Sydney ===
The "brilliant" Sydney has been described as Carmy's "most valued colleague." Syd is "an ambitious black girl who trained at the Culinary Institute of America." (Note: Syd's Blackness and her family tree has been little explored outside of her self-expression through hair and clothing styles, at least until the season four episode "Worms," but she is possibly Nigerian-American. Carmy is White under the current racial filing system.) Syd's presence has also been described as perhaps filling "the void his brother Michael left, but in a much healthier way." Carmy and Sydney have a deeply familiar, vulnerable, and often emotionally fraught partnership. Among other things, Syd "asserts a brand of female partnering we rarely get to see in popular culture. When Carmy flubs, Sydney challenges him. When she has better ideas, she speaks up. She recognizes his immaturity, selfishness and even his demons, and rarely lets him off the hook. She knows what he's capable of and holds him to a commensurate standard."

That there are romantic nuances to their relationship has been denied by show runners and actors. In 2023, executive producer Joanna Calo recounted that at one pointed she had pitched Syd and Carmy eventually kissing, and "'Chris was like, 'No!' [...] And he was totally right, but I think what I was getting at was that these relationships are complicated. I've heard people use the term 'work wife'—there are relationships in our lives that have all different meanings, and we sometimes really rush to characterize everything very cleanly. There's something beautiful about acknowledging how messy our lives really are and just how enmeshed so many of our relationships are." In 2025 Edebiri told a reporter, "I do think it's professional, and I do think if anything were to happen, it would not be the show that we're making. And I also think it would be so crazy. That man is crazy and that girl is a bad communicator! The restaurant would blow up in like three seconds if anything ever happened." She elsewhere described Marcus's devotion to jelly-filled doughnuts as the show's "sexiest relationship." When asked about Luca (Will Poulter) as an alternative romantic prospect for Sydney, Edebiri said "I don't know. Maybe they're just two Libras having a conversation? Who's to say, I don't have the scripts." In 2026, White told an interviewer that while restaurants are a "really great environment for drama and comedy and all this stuff. [...] the show, to me, could almost take place anywhere [...and is] about finding purpose, and passion, knowing what you're capable of, and how you can kind of show up for that, [... it's] a show about inspiration..."

One critic, arguing that fan opposition to a "Carmy and Sydney" pairing may have its roots in misogynoir, or unconscious biases about what relationship roles are "appropriate" for Black women, commented that "Sydney and Carmy's very slow burn is underlined by Carmy and Claire's very fast burn." A counterargument acknowledged the romantic prospects of the pairing and asserted that "SydCarmy is a product of social media, an arena where floating bigoted takes prompts engagement. A wound-up shipping contingent guarantees a vocal opposition will materialize," whereas that the authentic argument against romantic consummation is not racialized or gendered but an out-of-hand rejection of the "indolent model in romantic comedies that posits love can fix anything," all while "some viewers also search for signs of developments we want to see, producing the ever-widening rift between those who want Carmy and Syd to stay platonic and the SydCarmy masses yearning for the two to kiss already." NPR critic-at-large Eric Deggans noted after the series finale that TV series "which turn on whether the lead characters will connect romantically—called 'will they or won't they' stories—tend to fall apart after romance is consummated," a peril avoided by The Bear.

Critics have referred to an "undeniable" chemistry between the two leads, describing "stolen glances...mutual intolerance for the other's bullshit...creative compatibility...unspoken [or] very sweetly signed communication," and suggested "that these two fearful avoidants [being] as comfortable as they are with each other is no coincidence." The presence of Sydney sometimes seemingly allows Carmy to self-regulate in a way he cannot entirely manage when left to his own devices: "For [Carmy], [a panic attack] subsides because something snaps him out of it, or we cut back to reality...he has a couple of flashes, and then one of them is Sydney, and then he just calms down because Sydney's there and has his back." Another important element of their relationship is that "he cannot stand it when she is mad at him," despite being able to go months or years of no contact with other people in his life. In the words of a pair of pop-culture podcast hosts, "He is so in tuned with her and wanting to please her, that it's really so interesting to watch the way he just stares at her...He's so attentive of like her every breath almost...she walks into the room or he walks in...and he's immediately aware of her, like hyperaware of her." He also seemingly has a knack for soothing her insecurities; when she confesses a fear in season 2 that she will "just fuck up and fail" he promises her, "I won't let you." In season 5, he channels a memorable lesson from one of his mentors (Daniel Boulud: "What's very important is that you don't want smoke, but you want music. You hear the music here?") to talk her through nerves about cooking an important plate ("Take a breath...another one...Listen to the pan. You hear the music?")

The show is also laden with barely-sublimated sensuality (the pair frequently hover over "sizzling meat and simmering sauces"), and visual innuendoes. The pair's kitchen jargon naturally lends itself to horny double-entendres ("Hands!" "Behind!" "Yes, chef."). Season 1 was called the "horny, feel-tense show of the summer." The kitchen parlance of The Bear rapidly "made its way into dirty talk," and the sub-dom sexual subtext of "yes, chef" appeared as the post-coital punchline of an Emily Flake New Yorker cartoon. Scenes between the two alone together are often punctuated by lines that could be read unplatonically—Carmy prompts her to go out with him by saying "You should come," and he surfaces some of his old rage to insist, "I'm your fucking friend!"—and staging of scenes between the two chefs often "begs for an erotic reading." The under-the-table scene—wherein Syd and Carmy are wielding a shared screwdriver and nominally tightening purse hooks and leveling the table ("it's a little uneven")—has been described as "sex scene without any sex. Sensual music plays in the background...Then they switch positions (!) so that Carmy is on top and Syd is on the bottom."

For his part, Anthony Bourdain, one of the restaurant's patron saints, venerated with autographed pictures on the walls of the old Beef, argued that the relationship between a chef and his sous is often one of great intimacy: "My sous-chef, in an ideal situation, is like my wife. I'll go further: my sous-chef, in an ideal situation, is closer to me than my wife...All the things I couldn't do—or couldn't be seen to do—he did. And he did them well...Having a sous-chef with excellent cooking skills and a criminal mind is one of God's great gifts." The dynamic between the two has been described in multiple sources as "the beating heart of the show," with one writer arguing, "Their relationship feels specific and lived in, and as different as they are, Carmy and Syd compliment each other."

=== Other family, friends, and colleagues ===
The first name of the father of the Berzatto kids is unknown; he abandoned the family "probably sometime in the 1990s." Upon returning to Chicago Carmy reconnected with Richie and Jimmy, but other, more distant, relatives and friends of the family charged him with being a "fuckin loser" for working in a restaurant, and conflated him with Mikey. Carmy remained "no contact" with his mother until near the end of season 4, when he visited her house for the first time in many years.

In childhood, the three Berzatto siblings were known by nicknames suffixed with –bear: by birth order, they were Mikeybear, Sugarbear, and Babybear. In adulthood Carm is still called Bear by his sister, others who knew him in his youth, and the restaurant's pastry chef Marcus Brooks (Lionel Boyce), in whom Carmy discovers another kindred spirit and culinary equal. Chef Terry and Ebra both tend to call him by the more-formal Carmen, rather than Carmy. One of the cooks at the Beef, Tina Marrero (Liza Colón-Zayas), begins calling Carmy "Jeff" as a corruption of the more respectful title chef; Jeff and extensions such as Jeffrey eventually come to be used as endearments, when Tina transfers her affection for the late Mikey to his younger brother Carmy. Close to Marcus, Tina, and Syd in particular, Carmy tortures himself with regret over supposedly having "failed them."

In addition to Sugar, Marcus, Syd, Tina, and Richie on every third Thursday, Carmy has been supported by his compassionate and profane cousin Michelle Berzatto (Sarah Paulson), who is good to Carmy and who encouraged him to escape the chaos of the family home in Chicago and continue to pursue his career as a chef. Michelle and her husband Stevie (John Mulaney) let Carmy crash on their couch while he worked in New York.

Andrea Terry, a sophisticated businesswoman who treats Carmy warmly and generously, and a culinarily skilled and socially sharp colleague known as Chef Luca (Will Poulter), both from Ever, remain influential in Carmy's life as well. Luca, who fits in immediately and effortlessly with the staff of the Bear, "is cut from the same cloth as Carmy and is motivated by perfection and legacy more than money and taking the easy route to success." Similarly, while their social relationship is strictly restrained until after her retirement, Terry seems to have served as sort of surrogate mother figure who reparented Carmy by modeling the belief that "cooking for people...is 'time well spent'," whereas Donna saw cooking meals for her family as "only as time not recognized."

=== Mikey ===
The Berzatto brothers share just two scenes across the course of the series that are the two of them alone. In both scenes they discuss opening a new restaurant. Carmy pitches a restaurant called Mikey's in "Groundhogs," and Mikey suggests an alternative name, which he does not speak aloud before the scene ends. In "Fishes," Carmy's Christmas present to Mikey is an elevation sketch of what would become the Bear, complete with Chicago Bears-esque logo.

Mikey Berzatto's big personality and his final bequests to the baby of the family underlie Carmy's story, and resurface particularly in "Tomorrow" and "Goodbye," but "in both The Bear and Ted Lasso, the suicide of a (male) loved one functions as backstory for the protagonist, rather than being interrogated explicitly...suicide is rendered motivator or plot device rather than situated as a tangible element of the text."

The New York Times commended the visual storytelling of Carmy sending an SMS message while riding to work on the train in "Groundhogs," during "which we can see that he has been texting Mikey (and getting 'not delivered' notices) since his brother died." The visible messages are:

- Miss you bro
- Sat, Jan 21 at 4:03 p.m. - Found the tomato cans
- Wed, Apr 18 at 7:04 a.m. - You were right about Claire Bear
- Fri, May 26 at 7:28 a.m. - Thinking of you today
- Today, at 7:46 a.m. - The restaurant was called Kerrigan's

In season 5, when Richie recalls "slapping the shit out of your brother," Carmy reassures him, seemingly acknowledging Mikey's flaws: "He had it coming." In the series finale, "The Original Beef of Chicagoland," Carmy texts Mikey one last message, which unlike the other texts, ends in a period: "All good."

== Other attributes ==
Allen's portrayal of Carmy Berzatto has been described as "a realistic casting of that asshole" common to high-intensity kitchens, although "The Bear suggests that Carmy's going to be a different kind of leader, one who's learned from his own experience and wants to change the narrative instead of perpetuating it." Daniel Patterson, a chef who worked with series creator Storer on a documentary before quitting to make sandwiches, surmised that Carmy's iconic look was intended to be, ultimately, deconstructed: "...for the real-life cooks watching the show who see Carmy—with his perpetual grimace, rock-star hair, and cigarette dangling from his pouty lips—and feel like they've had it with the Marco Pierre White bullshit, I get it. We've all seen it before."

=== Sexuality, aesthetics, sex appeal ===
In the pilot episode, "System," Tina declares that Carmy cuts vegetables like a bitch and Richie declares that training elsewhere made Carmy "pompous, and delusional, and a fucking gayrod," which are intended as bullying attacks on Carmy's "masculinity (and thus his capability as a leader and a provider)." The issue is not so much his (undisclosed) sexual orientation, per se, as his "manner and methods of running the kitchen...at odds with the practice and priority of the other kitchen staff."

Patterson extended his description of Carmy as chef with the comment, "The sexy dirty chain-smoking rebel cook is both a cipher for bad-boy fantasies and apologia for white-boy bad behavior." In regard to the "bad-boy fantasies," the character of Carmy provoked an ode in Bon Appétit magazine to what is apparently a food-service industry stock character, "Sexually Competent Dirtbag Line Cook," about which it was written:

"If you've ever waited in vain for a text back from a man with no bed frame in his apartment, you're already pretty familiar with this type. Imagine no-bed-frame man, but he only drinks from plastic quart containers and cooks a spaghetti carbonara that will make you write in your journal for the first time since high school. Has he showered today? No. Are you going to be the one to change him and make him want to settle down? Also no!"

Carmy has been identified as the textbook model of a restaurant-kitchen resident lothario: "'This man does not have curtains in his apartment but he has a $1400 knife that is only for cutting fish.'" (Carmy's apartment is thrift-store furnished, and he has access to a mid-1990s Plymouth Voyager Sport.) Another analysis tagged him as a self-evidently attractive yet problematic fuck boy, discernible as such by his "tattoos, disheveled hair, and 20-a-day habit." One "particular screengrab" from the trailer engendered much online commentary about the sex appeal of sweaty season 1 Carmy; the key screengrab and associated tweet was later resurfaced for further comment on a late-night talk show. In season 4, while talking to Richie at Tiff's wedding, there is a hint that Jimmy is aware of this type of fellow, and that he connects him to Carmy in the context of his relationship with Claire: "I'm telling you, you and that fսckin' tweaked-out line cook pal of yours, you're a pair of fսckin' idiots." The sweaty-line-cook visual seemed to surface, for some:

"...memories of fun-yet-questionable hookups...the kind of guy who'd fuck me by a dumpster after closing out the restaurant at 2 a.m., sans condom. The irony is, the actual character, Carmy, doesn't fuck. He's so traumatized...that he has no energy for love. He can barely call his sister to check in on how she’s doing. It's likely that the last thing he's thinking about is getting laid. But it's understandable why, by looking at him, you'd think he's Chicago's hottest scumbag."

MEL magazine commented "Carmy might not be the guy these women are projecting onto him, but admittedly, there's something hot about a man who is trying to get his shit together, too." In 2022, White denied the dirtbag charges against his character; he thought Carmy was meant to be understood as a "genuine and nice guy." Per Salon.com, Carmy's dirtbag subcategory would be "heroic," in company with Cassian Andor of the Star Wars universe, as Carmy solved "a riddle left by his brother. And in doing so, he saved the jobs of his employees and their futures." White told an interviewer for W magazine that if people find Carmy attractive, "I hope it means that people understand Carmy as intrinsically good. He's behaved poorly at times, but I do think he's trying. And people trying...that's never not cool."

The New York Times described the character as a pinup, and analogized the chef to his family restaurant's signature dish: "Italian beef, but pouty with it." One critic quipped that the subject matter of the series was "sandwiches and trauma and Jeremy Allen White's biceps." A review of season 1 commended White's "pretty remarkable performance" but found his Carmy "oddly buff for a dude who runs a greasy spoon." (GQ UK reverse-engineered chef's likely diet and workout regimen, should anyone care duplicate it.) A critique of season 4 by Time magazine critic Judy Berman commented that, "The camera lingers for too long on his pained, Grecian-bust features. His every line is freighted with meaning. White does as great a job as is probably possible of making this overly aestheticized archetype into a believable human being."

=== Home ===
Carmy has an apartment somewhere in Chicago, possibly in the West Loop or Wicker Park. In season 1, Carmy stores his denim collection in his unused home oven, maximizing space in a city apartment and emphasizing that despite being a chef the hearth at his home is cold. He often falls asleep on his couch watching TV, for instance to Pasta Granny Maria making lasagne verdi with spinach noodles on YouTube. Carmy's apartment "is an impersonal space where he spends little time. Unlike the restaurant where his most significant professional and personal relationships unfold, his flat is a space that is rarely explored."

=== Hair and costuming ===
A photo of London chef Marco Pierre White on the cover of The Devil in the Kitchen inspired Carmy's hairstyle in season 1. Carmy's default plain white T-shirt suggests to some that the show styles him as a "James Dean of the kitchen pass." (The Bear uses a handful of T-shirt brands for Carm but most prominently one produced by German textile company Merz b. Schwanen). The look is understated to the point of being simple, but still evocative: "Looking closer at the details, this is a very well-fitting tee, hitting at a nice point on the bicep as well as a nice flattering point at the waistline where they should. The other thing is care. It is hardly ever stained. It takes a skilled chef to be able to always wear white tees, not stained."

At the restaurant he wears mostly Carhartt "Work In Progress" pants and sometimes Dickies work pants. Jeremy Allen White and Carmy Berzatto both wear Nike Cortez sneakers, which sometimes leads to confusion in the costume trailer. His restaurant work shoes are Birkenstock's Tokio design, a chef standard. According to Courtney Wheeler, costume designer for The Bear, "Carmy is very classic, very well-worn, but great quality and perfectly cut. Carmy approaches each piece in a considered way when he buys it, so later he doesn't have to think about what he's wearing at all." On another occasion she said, "Carmy is a creature of habit and detail, as most chefs are. He doesn't waste time thinking about what he throws on in the morning, but he cares about fit, quality, and timelessness of his clothes...He has his uniform, and he's confident in it." Unlike other key characters, time-obsessed Carmy does not wear a wristwatch, in part, according to prop master Laura Roeper because per creator Storer, "He would never go to a store and buy something [like that] for himself."

Carmy's fuzzy NN07 Gael jacket, which sold out after he wore it in season 1, has been called "iconic," and the gray cable-knit sweater from the "Sundae" episode supposedly "went viral."

=== Scars and tattoos ===
Carmy has at least two visible scars that have drawn comment from other characters: one on the inside of his left bicep, and one on the palm of his right hand. Chef Fields mocks his "cool scars" in episode 2, "Hands."

Carmy has nine tattoos that have been seen on the show. Tattoos are common among the "creative and rebellious" chefs who staff American restaurants. White said in 2022 that the tattoos were "for Carmy...sort of an armor, and I don't think he felt that tough all the time, and that got him here."

Carmy does not yet have hand or knuckle tattoos at the time of the "Ceres," "Fishes," or "Groundhogs" flashbacks. In the time looping episode "Tomorrow," Carmy's visible tattoos track his career progression; for instance, in the scenes set at French Laundry at the beginning of his career, he has no tattoos yet on his fingers or on the backs of his hands.

1. SOU tattoo, on the fingers of his left hand just above his knuckles; SOU could be the beginning of soul, is pronounced like the beginning of soup or sous-chef, but stands for "sense of urgency," which is a catchphrase used in Thomas Keller restaurant kitchens. (The Bear creator Christopher Storer directed a documentary on Keller called Sense of Urgency.)
2. Flower tattoo on his left hand
3. Earth in a glass Pyrex measuring cup on left forearm
4. Chicago area code 773 on left upper arm
5. Chef's knife piercing through a hand, right hand
6. The Grim Reaper shaking hands with a bottle of rotgut moonshine marked with three Xs, inner left forearm
7. Snail, above "live fast," written in script, left forearm
8. Two winged cherubs reaching for a sun, left forearm above the snail near his elbow; White says he thinks maybe Carmy got that when Mikey was still alive to represent his two siblings, Natalie and Michael
9. Fish marked with either the Roman numeral X (10) or an hourglass, inner right forearm

=== Religious and ethnic background ===
The Berzattos are Italian American by heritage; media critics have found that the show traffics in stereotypes of Italian Americans being primarily consumed with gangsterism, "food and sex," but that Carmy's "pervasive/invasive relationship with family emerges as the theme of the series." As former Chicago resident Chris Witaske (who plays Carmy's brother-in-law Pete) put it in 2023, "I also think The Bear really captures how in Chicago you're all on top of each other all the time. It creates these really strong bonds of friendship and family. I always talk about how, in L.A., if you want to see your friends you have to make plans and then stick to the plans and then drive 30 minutes. In Chicago, you walk down the street and see half your friend group and then go into a bar and everybody else is there. It's a tighter-knit community."

Unlike his older brother Mikey, Carmy himself has "no stereotypically Italian American features—[he is] blond, blue-eyed, with a constant astonished expression on his face, his attractiveness deriving from boyish appearance, barely counterbalanced by numerous tattoos and tight muscles." The Berzattos have a Roman Catholic religious background. The family celebrates the Feast of the Seven Fishes; Carmy and his siblings sometimes make a ritual appeal to Our Mother of Victory, an embodiment of the Virgin Mary.

=== Artwork and food journals ===
A less-publicized aspect of his creativity is his skill as a visual artist; Carmy fills a series of food journals "with beautiful drawings of ingredients he's worked with and meals he's imagined."

His artwork first appears in passing in the pilot, where his elevation sketch of the Bear is visible in the bathroom of the Beef, but this picture is not identified as Carmy's work until season 2's "Fishes." Later in the second season Carmy shows drawings of proposed dishes to Sydney; he could not cook in their restaurant that had no gas line, so he sketched them, which "established just how good of an artist he is...Season 3 really emphasized this, with flashbacks to his time working at esteemed restaurants showing how he'd create intricate drawings of various dish ideas."

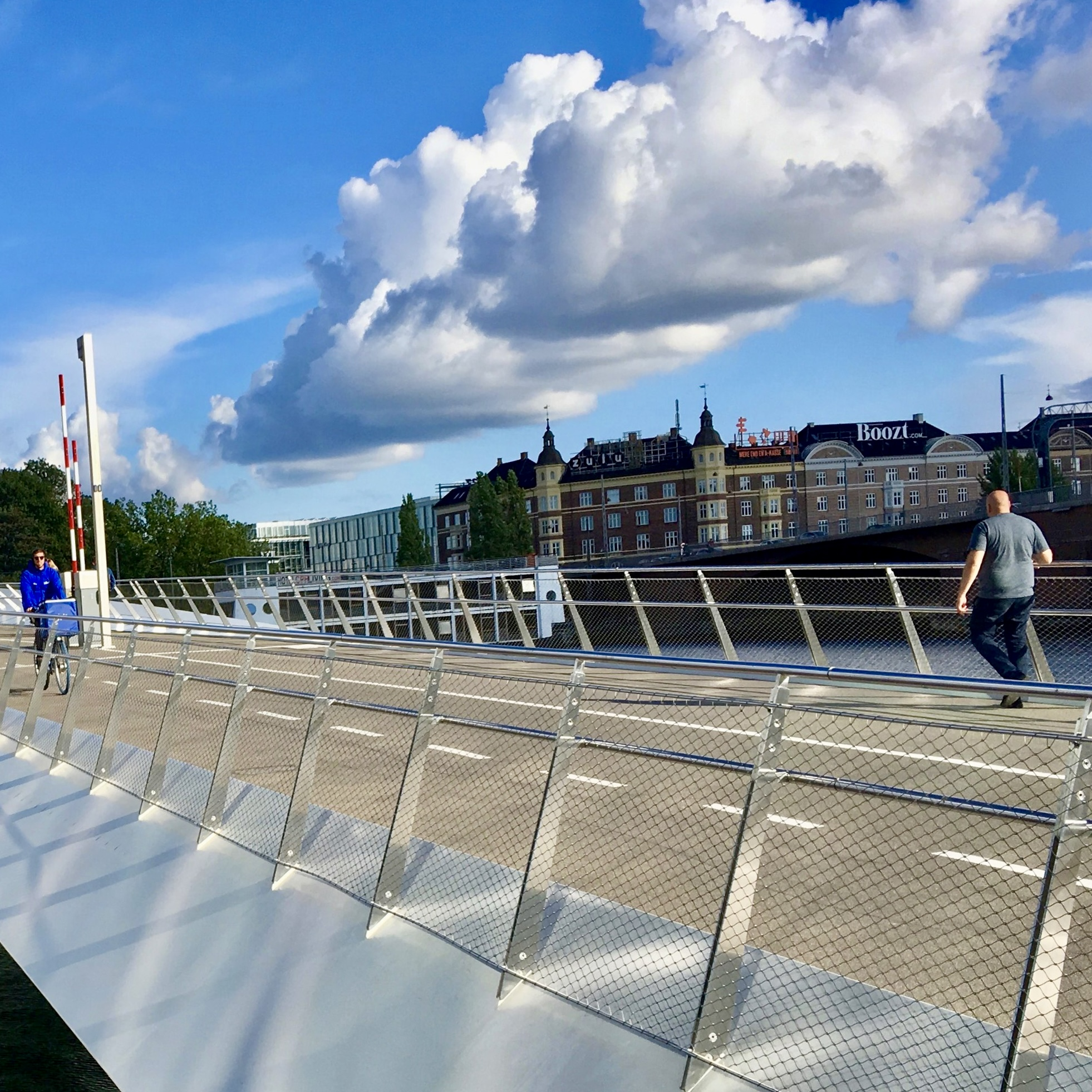
While in Copenhagen, Carmy journals on Lille Langebro (transl. little long bridge), which is for foot and bicycle traffic. Langebro, the next bridge over, is for automobiles.

Carmy's food journaling is depicted most extensively in the "Tomorrow" and "Apologies" flashback scenes, and then Donna pages through the books when visiting the Bear in season 5, with shots that depict previously unseen dishes, including what might be the grapefruit scallop that Sydney called the best bite she ever had. In Copenhagen he appears to use Leuchtturm1917 journals from a company based in Geesthacht, near Hamburg, Germany. His Ever journal is a Moleskine. One of his mentors, Chef Terry, noticed his artwork, and it may have influenced her decision to refer him for further training in Copenhagen. In seasons 3 and 4, Marcus frequently refers to Carmy's old notebooks, four of which he stores in the office at the Bear: Carmy/Copenhagen, Carmy New York, Carmy Daniel Boulud, and Carmy – The French Laundry. The Bear's Lisa Korpan-led art department teamed up to create Carmy's drawings and food journals through the end of season three. Chicago artist Denise Dietz was commissioned to create the "Sistine Chapel" artworks that Carmy showed Sydney "of the scripted dishes," when they did not yet have a functioning restaurant kitchen," and Abacuc Rodriguez "our in-house art department illustration star...kind of filled in all the other pages." In season 5, he leaves four of his journals behind at the Bear for Marcus, but not the most recent volume for his work at the Bear.

=== Habits and props ===
- Smoking: Carmy was a compulsive cigarette smoker for most of his adult life and into the first two seasons of the show. His cousin Stevie described Carmy as smelling, generally, like "pledge week at a Sicilian fraternity...sweat, death, lemons, garlic...oh, and the most cigarettes." Carmy quit smoking in season 3, "Tomorrow," seemingly newly disgusted by the sight of a stub-filled ashtray left in the restaurant overnight. Carm started working nicotine-replacement gum as intensely as he once burned tobacco. He told Chi-Chi (Christopher Zucchero) that he was doing it to save the five minutes it takes to smoke, and he told Sydney he still thought about it, but "only every 10 seconds." The gum regimen and Carmy's determination to clean up his act seemingly worked to break the long-held habit, but he picked it up again in the season-four finale, "Goodbye," when novice Sydney, feeling "abandoned and enraged," inexplicably took up smoking, apparently driven by a combination of spite and nostalgia. Carmy resentfully joined her, lighting her up and later feeding her lit cigarettes while he continued to verbally deconstruct his relationship with Richie. He smokes again in season 5, but also tells Sydney he doesn't smoke anymore while cleaning cigarette butts out of the outside drain.
- Sharpies: Sharpie markers have a constant presence in Carmy's kitchen and character arc. In "Review" he barks orders about them ("Somebody get me a fucking Sharpie that fucking works!") and later whips one at Sydney's retreating form as she leaves him. In the words of one writer, "A Sharpie is never just a Sharpie...a Sharpie is an organizer. A Sharpie is a reminder that, as he tells his staff of chefs, consistency is the only way to level up...Sydney Adamu (Ayo Edebiri) forgets to turn off the pre-order option, Carmy lunges for a Sharpie to order the madness. However, it's not where it's supposed to be." In a later episode, "Doors," Syd and Carm prep for a night of service, Carmy makes the Sharpies are at hand and that Sydney has her customary Coke. In the same scene he notices she changed the document template for their order tickets; she tells him she made the margins wider because he writes notes in the margins (often with Sharpies, visible in flashback in episode 2 "Hands").
- Tape: "Sheridan" is the first episode where Carmy demonstrates cutting tape (rather than tearing it). When Food & Wine writers were indexing Carmy's bookshelves for an article "our editor-in-chief...said on Slack when he saw the semi-incoherent shelving: 'Curious as to why Carmy obsesses over the perfect tape edges à la Sean Brock but not more rhyme or reason for his bookshelves.'" An Eater writer speculated that Carmy uses 3M painter's tape; his preference for green is less common than the use of blue and is probably inherited from his old boss Chef David Fields (Joel McHale). The New York TimesWirecutter section surmised it was green FrogTape multisurface painter's tape. Thomas Keller, of the French Laundry and Bouchon and Per Se, is known to prefer neon green tape. According to Food52, some professional kitchens have strict tape rules, such as: "...the tape has to get cut with a pair of scissors in a straight line, with a small tab folded over for ease of removal. On it should be written the product name, date, and initials of the person who packed the container." Precise taping is thought to promote mental clarity in the kitchen and attention to detail in the dishes prepared and served at the restaurant. One former line cook wrote in 2023, "I remember when I first learned the importance of cutting tape versus tearing it to make labels for my prep—this scene felt like such a key moment, as it's this attention to detail that propels the good chefs to award-winning chefs."
- Knives: Carmy's knives have been called part of a "profound gear-related story arc." In the pilot, he searches for his lost knife, believing he is being hazed by the Beef cooks, but then spots it inadvertently knocked under a cabinet in the kitchen. Carmy uses a hand-forged Japanese-made knife (gyūtō). According to one source Carmy's knife is made by bladesmith Yoshimi Kato in Japan's Takefu Knife Village. According to another it is a Yoshimi Echizen knife that is usually only available in the United States through a single shop in Beverly Hills, California. Whatever the source, he eventually gives it to Tina ("Yours, chef"), which has been called a "three-Kleenex moment."

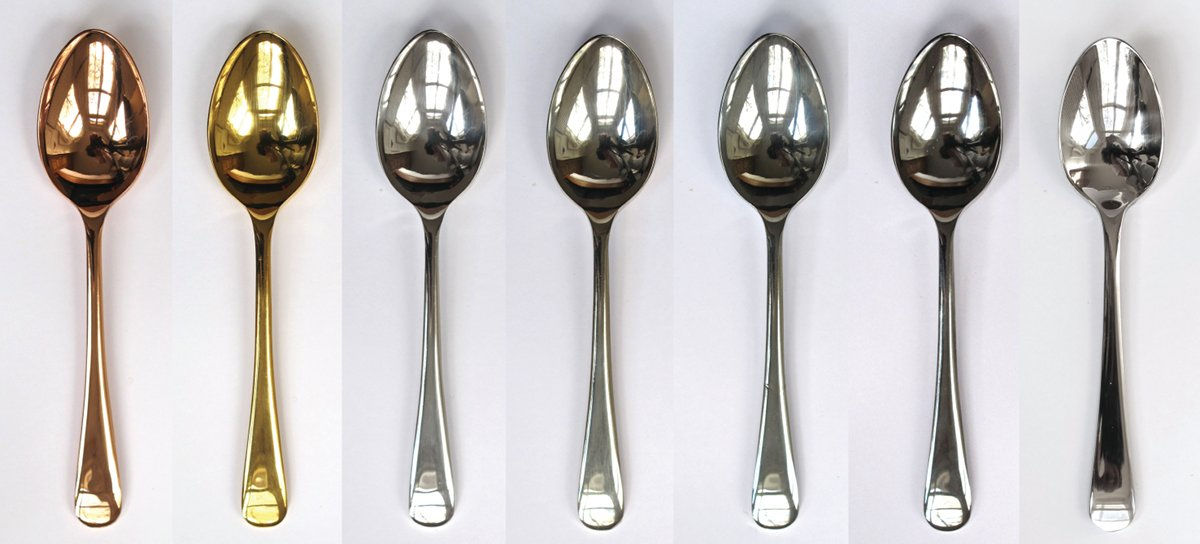
Tasting spoons

- Spoon: For much of seasons 1, 2, and 3, Carmy often seems to "stim" in the kitchen with an "emotional-support spoon" he carries around with him. Camera operator Gary Malouf stated in an interview: "[Our job is] find those textures that the actors are so good at bringing. [In season one], Jeremy would just be waiting to go while they reset all the food, but he'd keep tapping that spoon like crazy—someone shoot that. We were constantly trying to find these little details that could help build the world around us without ever feeling like we were in anybody's way." While asking Tina about his mom in season 1, "he nervously drums a spoon between his thumb and forefinger." After Sweeps and Tina put out the fire Carmy accidentally set in the kitchen in "Braciole," he is refocused by Richie and then seems to be reflexively reaching for the spoon he usually keeps at the small of his back, but it's not there. In the season 3 premiere episode "Tomorrow," the origin story of the spoon is told: once upon a time, mentor Chef Terry (Olivia Colman) ceded control of saucing a dish, tacitly acknowledging Carmy as a worthy successor, at which time she quietly told him, "keep the spoon." In "Green," Carmy, in turn, passes the torch to Sydney, handing her his "emotional-support spoon" as a gesture of trust in anticipation of his forthcoming departure from day-to-day management of the Bear. Carmy's spoon is most likely a Gray Kunz-brand sauce spoon, which is "a workhorse of restaurant kitchens" and "beloved by professional chefs". Eventually, other chefs in Carmy's kitchen begin "almost fetishizing this slightly oversized spoon...In [season 5], we actually see Sydney tuck it in the back of her apron, almost the way a gunfighter might hide a Colt revolver...at least one character uses the spoon to make a point in season 4. When Tina asks Carmy if he's seen his sister Natalie's newborn, and he responds, 'Which baby?' she waves the Gray Kunz at him" and gives him a few choice words. One of Carmy's most actionable "non-negotiables" is "never run out of teaspoons," but there is a distinct spoon shortage in season 5. Carmy double-dips with the same tasting spoon and licks his fingers while tasting Syd's cola-ribs sauce, which, for fancy-chef him, is insane. Ebra the fox investigates, eventually revealing Marcus the hyena as a spoon hoarder: "You are the son of a bitch...Now other people are short spoons."

== See also ==
- List of The Bear characters
- List of The Bear episodes
- Food of The Bear
- Music on The Bear
- Family on The Bear

== Sources ==
- Chagollan, Steve (March–April 2023). "No Substitutions: For the makers of The Bear, there was never any question that Chicago would play itself. Practical locations were key, and the beauty is in the details" (PDF). Produced By. Los Angeles, California: Producers Guild of America. pp. 44–51.
- Di Maio, Cristina (2025). "New Italian American Fathering in the Time of the Gig Economy: The Case of The Bear". Diasporic Italy: Journal of the Italian American Studies Association. 5. Champaign, Illinois: University of Illinois Press: 105–121. doi:10.5406/27697738.05.1.08. ISSN 2769-772X. OCLC 1267410841.
- Flores Jurado, Julieta (June 27, 2024). "A Fork in the Road? Rethinking Culinary Genius, Power Dynamics, and the Impact of Social Movements on U.S. Food Media and Popular Culture". Norteamérica. 19 (2). doi:10.22201/cisan.24487228e.2024.2.674. ISSN 2448-7228. Archived from the original on 2025-06-21.
- Grazia Serra, Alessandra Olga (May 2024). "The Bear: New (stereotypical) representations of Italian Americans in contemporary television series". Forum Italicum: A Journal of Italian Studies. 58 (1): 114–124. doi:10.1177/00145858231223974. ISSN 0014-5858.
- Kaula, David (Winter 1963). "'In War with Time': Temporal Perspectives in Shakespeare's Sonnets". Studies in English Literature, 1500–1900. 3 (1): 45–57. doi:10.2307/449544. ISSN 0039-3657. JSTOR 449544.
- Martynuska, Małgorzata (February 2026). "'Every Second Counts': Representing Chicago's Urban Identity in the TV Series The Bear". Perspektywy Kultury. 53 (2). Kraków: Ignatianum University in Cracow: 75–91. ISSN 2081-1446.
- Muthumanickam, Aruna (February 17, 2026). "The Bear". Journal of Palliative Medicine. 29 (8) 10966218261418107. doi:10.1177/10966218261418107. ISSN 1096-6218. PMID 41700973.
- Nikolova, Zlatina (July 2025). "'Every second counts': Urban affect and culinary chaos in The Bear". The Journal of Popular Television. 13 (1): 43–59. doi:10.1386/jptv_00135_1. ISSN 2046-9861. Archived from the original on 2026-04-19.
- Singer, Christoph (2026). "The chef and the city: Mobile masculinities in Chef and The Bear". Journal of Urban Cultural Studies. 13 (1): 119–132. doi:10.1386/jucs_00114_1. ISSN 2050-9790.
- Wang, Dingkun (April 2, 2025). "Translating the sensitive content in audiovisual fiction: the expanding case of Chinese subtitling in the streaming era". The Translator. 31 (4). Taylor & Francis: 344–356. doi:10.1080/13556509.2025.2485884. ISSN 1355-6509.
