= Braciole (The Bear) =

- The Bear episode
- Episode no.: Season 1 Episode 8
- Directed by: Christopher Storer
- Written by: Christopher Storer; Joanna Calo
- Cinematography by: Andrew Wehde
- Editing by: Joanna Naugle
- Production code: XCBV1008
- Original release date: June 23, 2022
- Running time: 48 minutes

Guest appearances
- Matty Matheson as Neil Fak; Edwin Lee Gibson as Ebraheim; Corey Hendrix as Gary "Sweeps" Woods; Chris Witaske as Pete; Carmen Christopher as Chester; Joel McHale as Chef David Fields; Jon Bernthal as Michael Berzatto; Richard Esteras as Manny; Jose Cervantes Jr. as Angel; Millie Hurley as Tracy; P. J. Fishwick as meat delivery guy; Gram Otero Livermore as Joey; Brian Boland as guard #1; Nicholas Zakula as guard #2; Kevin Regal as guard #3; Gillian Jacobs as Tiffany Jerimovich (voice); Paul Rudd as Ballbreaker Video game (voice)

Episode chronology
← Previous "Review"	Next → "Beef"
- The Bear season 1

"Braciole" is the eighth episode and first season finale of the American television comedy-drama The Bear. The episode was written by series creator Christopher Storer and executive producer Joanna Calo, and directed by Storer. It was released on Hulu on June 23, 2022, along with the rest of the season.

The series follows Carmen "Carmy" Berzatto, an award-winning New York City chef de cuisine, who returns to his hometown of Chicago to run his late brother Michael's failing Italian beef sandwich shop. In the episode, Carmy faces his past, while trying to repair the situation with the restaurant.

The episode received acclaim from critics, with Jeremy Allen White's performance receiving both universal praise and a Primetime Emmy Award for Outstanding Lead Actor in a Comedy Series.

== Plot ==
Carmy (Jeremy Allen White) is haunted by the recurring voice of Michael (Jon Bernthal). He attends an Al-Anon meeting, where—in a seven-minute monologue—he finally opens up about his past, explaining how he and Michael shared an interest in food and planned on opening a restaurant and how he was unaware of Michael's drug use, and how their relationship dwindled which eventually caused Michael to not allow him to work at The Beef. This inspired Carmy to pursue cuisine in other restaurants. Upon inheriting The Beef after Michael's death, Carmy considers that he is fixing the restaurant in order to fix his relationship with Michael. He claims it is everything to him, but wonders if it means anything to Michael.

Marcus (Lionel Boyce) meets with Syd (Ayo Edebiri) at her apartment, where he eats one of her meals. Their conversation soon turns into their new journeys, with both having quit The Beef. At The Beef, Carmy informs everyone that the restaurant will be closed that night due to a bachelor party for Cicero's friends. As Carmy and Richie (Ebon Moss-Bachrach) talk outside, a fight breaks out during the party. Richie tries to control the situation by assaulting one of the men who are fighting, but after Richie punches him, the man loses consciousness and is admitted to a hospital intensive care unit. Richie is arrested with the possibility of a manslaughter charge if the victim does not survive. The man wakes up, and Richie is charged with aggravated assault. He is released when Carmy bails him out.

Carmy, Richie, Manny, Angel, Ebra, Sweeps, and Tina begin cleaning up the damage from the bachelor party. Richie puts on a blue apron for the first time. Marcus returns to The Beef. Carmy apologizes for his behavior, which Marcus accepts. When Carmy starts a fire on the stove from lighting a cigarette, he zones out. Sweeps and Tina put the fire out. Richie talks with him, giving him a letter from Michael addressed to Carmy that was found wedged behind the employee lockers. At 10:30 a.m., Carmy goes out to the alley to read what amounts to Michael's suicide note, but decides to text Syd first, apologizing for his behavior. On one side of the letter, Michael wrote, "I love you dude. Let it rip," a phrase Carmy previously shared that Michael had used to encourage Carmy. On the opposite side of the letter is a family meal spaghetti recipe, which indicates that they should use smaller cans of tomatoes because they taste better (apparently finally solving the mystery of why Michael was ordering small cans rather than big ones, which Carmy had been wondering). Carmy retrieves one and starts cooking, until he notices a plastic-wrapped wad of cash amongst the tomatoes. Carmy and the crew retrieve more cans, all of which contain money as well. At 11:55 a.m. Syd returns and agrees to come back to work. Carmy announces the closure of The Beef, intending to open a new restaurant, The Bear. He then joins the crew to dine, envisioning Michael smiling back at him.

== Production ==
=== Development ===
In May 2022, Hulu confirmed that the eighth episode of the season would be written by series creator Christopher Storer and executive producer Joanna Calo, and directed by Storer. This was Storer's fourth writing credit, Calo's second writing credit, and Storer's fifth directing credit.

=== Casting ===
Gillian Jacobs first plays Tiffany, Richie's ex-wife, in this episode. Jacobs recorded four versions of Tiff's outgoing voicemail message on her phone from Marseille, where she was filming Transatlantic. Actor Paul Rudd has an uncredited voice role as the Ballbreaker video game that talks back to Fak.

=== Writing ===
Storer was inspired to write about keeping cash in tomato sauce because of stories of drugs being hidden that way. He told IndieWire in 2022:

There is a semi-automatic electric can-seamer at the restaurant, which is a quick process and very easy to use. Michael was most likely instructed to not put the money in the bank for myriad tax reasons. In his scattered state, the processing of the tomato cans really felt like he was starting to build something, felt more like a real plan of action to him. A safe felt too safe, too obvious. I know it sounds completely absurd, but in researching various kitchens, I was really shocked how many stories and articles I had come across or heard about where money or drugs were found in sealed aluminum tomato cans. I guess the police dogs can't smell anything over the acidic tomatoes and I definitely think Michael had heard some version of that somewhere.

The opening sequence was originally different. While it would still involve Carmy in a cooking show, he would actually be accompanied by a female celebrity chef. Carmy would confuse her for his mother and then hug her while sobbing. However, the celebrity chef was confused about the scene and decided to drop out of the series, forcing the writers to re-write the scene.

Regarding the final scene, Storer explained, "In terms of the restaurant changing, it's not that they're going to lose all the charm of the restaurant. We're going to deal with this in season two. It's more like: How can we do this and maybe make some money? And maybe make it easier? And maybe—maybe—start from a place that's not fucked? Instead of beating a dead horse and making this fuckin' food that no one even wants to make, I see the promise in my sort of found family in the kitchen. Can we use that to build something freshly, now that we've all found each other in this stupid-ass system where things make no sense and people are putting veal stock on the top fuckin' shelf of the walk-in?" Allen said that his take on the scene was "it ends with this really beautiful...family meal with laughter and the sun shining through and his brother is still there, and you can tell he's proud of him. And I realized maybe I'm looking at this scene in the wrong way and it's really just a feeling, another dream. And so I think what that scene means is Carmy's starting to let some light in, starting to let some people in, I think."

=== Filming ===
The cooking-show nightmare was the first scene White filmed when the show was picked up to series from the pilot. The aspect ratio and color grading for the dream sequence are different from the rest of the episode. The more-square fullscreen aspect ratio establishes that the TV show in Carmy's dream dates to an earlier era.

The church where Carmy goes to an Al-Anon meeting is Quinn Chapel A.M.E. Church. Carmy's seven-minute monologue was filmed on the last day of shooting for the season. White rehearsed the monologue at his apartment, even feeling that he performed better at that point than in the final cut. He explained, "Chris has had this character in his mind for like ten years, and I knew how important that moment was to understand Carmy, understand the story, and to make sense of the stuff that was going on. I felt a lot of pressure." He told GoldDerby, "I knew it was really important to deliver it in a way that was Carmy making these discoveries. Carmy's not a vocal person, not a great communicator, and so I felt like it was important that while maybe he's thought about these things, he's really coming to realizations as he's kind of speaking to the group, speaking to himself. And so it was a tough balance to find because obviously it's a lot of words to memorize, but I didn't want it to get it too cold. I didn't want it to be on the tip of my tongue every next word."

Storer said, "In this scene, I think there's a sense of discovery; that all of his accolades and his quest to become this highly skilled individual were perhaps for the wrong reasons. And that all culminates with an anger pointed at his older brother; that real sense of feeling unloved or forgotten by a family member."

== Reception ==
=== Critical reviews ===
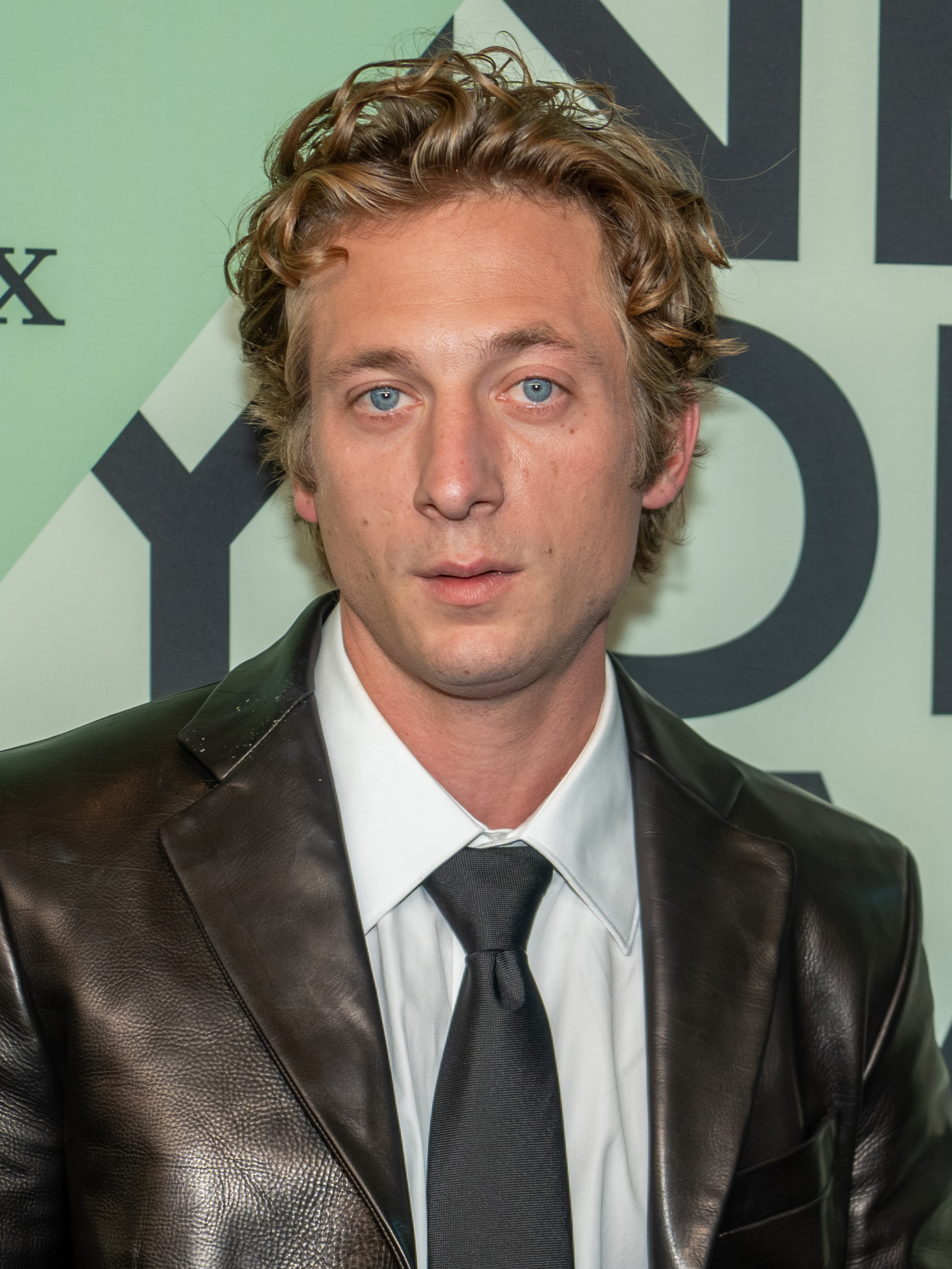
Jeremy Allen White's performance in the episode received universal acclaim from critics.

"Braciole" received acclaim from critics. Alan Sepinwall of Rolling Stone wrote, "On the one hand, this happy ending—and setup for a second season—feels pretty jury-rigged. Why was Michael hiding the money in the tomato cans? Won't Carmy just have to pay back his uncle rather than invest all this cash turning Beef into Bear? And yet that family meal feels like exactly what Carmy, Sydney, the rest of the chefs, and those of us in the audience needed. The brief glimpse of Michael looking over his shoulder and smiling, as if he can somehow witness what he left behind for Carmy and the others, couldn't be lovelier."

Marah Eakin of Vulture gave the episode a perfect 5 star out of 5 rating and wrote, "Folks, Jeremy Allen White is a good actor. He's been lighting up every episode of The Bear as Carmy, the tortured genius chef with all manner of problems, but in 'Braciole,' the season-one finale, he comes in so hot with an Al-Anon monologue that I'd be shocked (shocked, I say!) if I didn't see it on every awards reel submitted to every TV voter next year." Liz Kocan of Decider wrote, "In the last moments of the season, Carmy puts a sign in the window notifying customers that The Beef is closing, and in its place will stand a new venture, known as The Bear. I mean, on the one hand, it's a devastating thought, realizing Mikey was saving all of this money knowing that one day he wouldn't be there to share in the dream he had with his brother, but on the other, it's a supremely satisfying way for a beautifully written and acted season to sign off."

=== Accolades ===
Award	Category	Nominee(s)	Result	Ref.
Primetime Emmy Awards	Outstanding Lead Actor in a Comedy Series	Jeremy Allen White	Won	
Primetime Creative Arts Emmy Awards	Outstanding Guest Actor in a Comedy Series	Jon Bernthal	Nominated	
Writers Guild of America Awards	Episodic Comedy	Joanna Calo and Christopher Storer (for "Braciole")	Nominated	

TVLine named Jeremy Allen White as the "Performer of the Week" for the week of July 2, 2022, for his performance in the episode. The site wrote, "As the talented but troubled chef at the center of Hulu's frenetically paced restaurant drama, the Shameless vet cooked up a fascinating lead performance: a little salty and a little spicy, with lots of interesting flavors and textures layered in. In the poignant season finale—that we're really hoping isn't a series finale—White dug deep into what really makes his character Carmy tick and blew us away with a mesmerizing monologue that was part scathing confessional, part much-needed pep talk."
