= The Speed of Life =

2007 American drama film

- Film poster
- Directed by: Ed Radtke
- Written by: M.S. Nieson; Ed Radtke
- Produced by: Ira Deutchman; Greg O'Connor; Jonathan Sachar
- Starring: Jeremy Allen White; Peter Appel
- Cinematography: Learan Kahanov
- Edited by: Jim Klein; Ed Radtke
- Music by: Tim Berger
- Production companies: Morningstar Films; Kindred Media Group; Solaris; Transparent Films
- Release date: August 30, 2007 (Venice)
- Running time: 85 minutes
- Country: United States
- Language: English

The Speed of Life is an American drama film, directed by Ed Radtke and released in 2007. The film stars Jeremy Allen White as Sammer, a bored teenager in New York City who steals video cameras from tourists and retreats into fantasies based on the footage he finds on them.

The film premiered on August 30, 2007 at the 64th Venice International Film Festival.

== Plot ==
After his father allegedly moves to Alaska, foster kid Sammer and friends begin stealing camera's from tourists. They sell the cameras, but Sammer keeps the tapes to get a glimpse into other people's lives. Probation officer Frank pays Sammer to follow around Jerry, an old man with many grievances.

== Critical reception ==
Reviewing the film for Variety, Jay Weissberg described it as a story about misfit teenagers in Brooklyn who steal video cameras. While noting the film's ambition, he argued that its large ensemble of characters ultimately causes the narrative to lose focus.

== Cast ==
- Jeremy Allen White as Sammer
- Justin Soto as Dukie
- Peter Appel as Frank
- Edward Seamon as Jerry
- Joelee Cummings as Danelle
- Noah Fleiss as Vincent
- Blaze Foster as Juan-Si
- Catrina Ganey as Marnie
- Louisa Krause as Jule
- Samantha Hosie-Leung as Ween

== Awards ==
The film won the Director's Choice award for Excellence in Screenwriting at the 2009 Sedona International Film Festival. It also won the Queer Lion award for best LGBTQ-related film at the 64th Venice International Film Festival.

== See also ==
- At the Speed of Life, 1996 album by Xzibit
- 2018-2019 Exhibition of photographer: Peter Hujar: Speed of Life; died from AIDS, 1987
