= Jeremy Allen White =

American actor (born 1991)

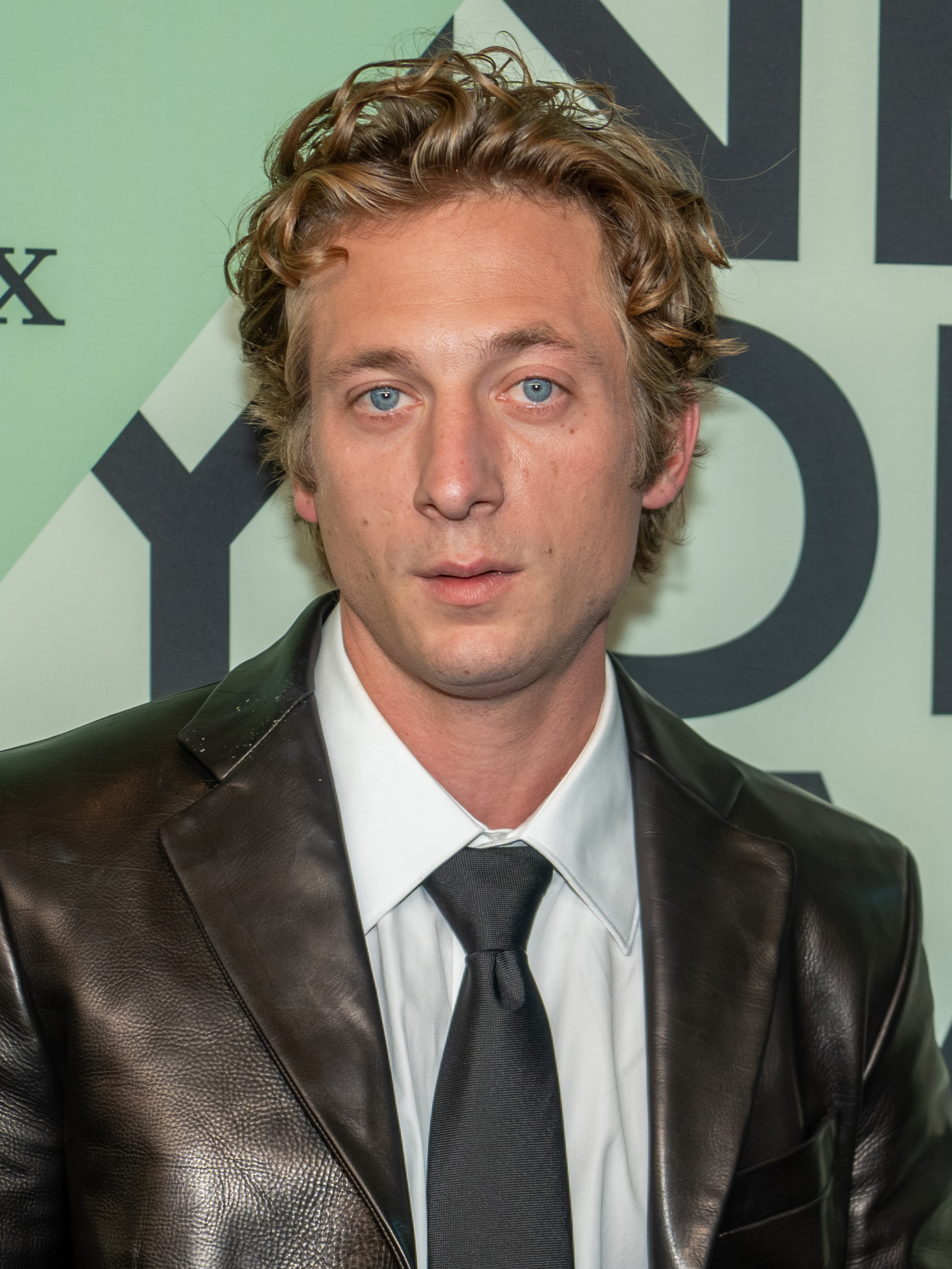
- White at the 2025 New York Film Festival
- Born: February 17, 1991 (age 35); New York City, U.S.
- Occupation: Actor
- Years active: 2005–present
- Spouse: Addison Timlin (m. 2019; sep. 2023)
- Children: 2

Jeremy Allen White (born February 17, 1991) is an American actor. He is best known for portraying Lip Gallagher in the comedy-drama series Shameless (2011–2021) and Carmen "Carmy" Berzatto in the psychological dramedy series The Bear (2022–2026). His performance in the latter earned him three Actor Awards, two Critics' Choice Awards, three Golden Globe Awards, and two Primetime Emmy Awards.

In film, White has starred in The Speed of Life (2007), Afterschool (2008), Bad Turn Worse and Movie 43 (both 2013), After Everything (2018), The Rental (2020), and Fingernails (2023). He portrayed professional wrestler Kerry Von Erich in the family drama The Iron Claw (2023), musician Bruce Springsteen in the music biopic Springsteen: Deliver Me from Nowhere (2025), for which he was nominated for the Golden Globe Award for Best Actor in a Motion Picture – Drama, and investigative journalist Jeff Horwitz in the legal thriller The Social Reckoning (2026).

== Early life and education ==
Jeremy Allen White was born in the borough of Brooklyn in New York City on February 17, 1991, to Eloise Zeigler and Richard White. He has a younger sister named Annabelle. White grew up in Brooklyn's Carroll Gardens neighborhood. His mother is from North Carolina. White's parents are both former actors, having met when his father attended a play his mother acted in. After White was born, his father started a company that filmed depositions, and his mother became a teacher.

As a child, White began acting in theatre, attributing his confidence in performing to that early experience. Throughout elementary school, White was a dancer who performed ballet, jazz, and tap dance. Upon entering a new middle school dance program at the age of 13, he decided to pursue acting. He attended the Professional Performing Arts School (PPAS) in the Hell's Kitchen neighborhood of Manhattan. While attending the school, he spent his free time working at the Susan Shopmaker Casting agency. White frequently ditched his after-lunch classes and did not earn enough credits to graduate, but he was awarded a high school diploma at age 34.

== Career ==
=== 2006–2021: Early work and Shameless ===
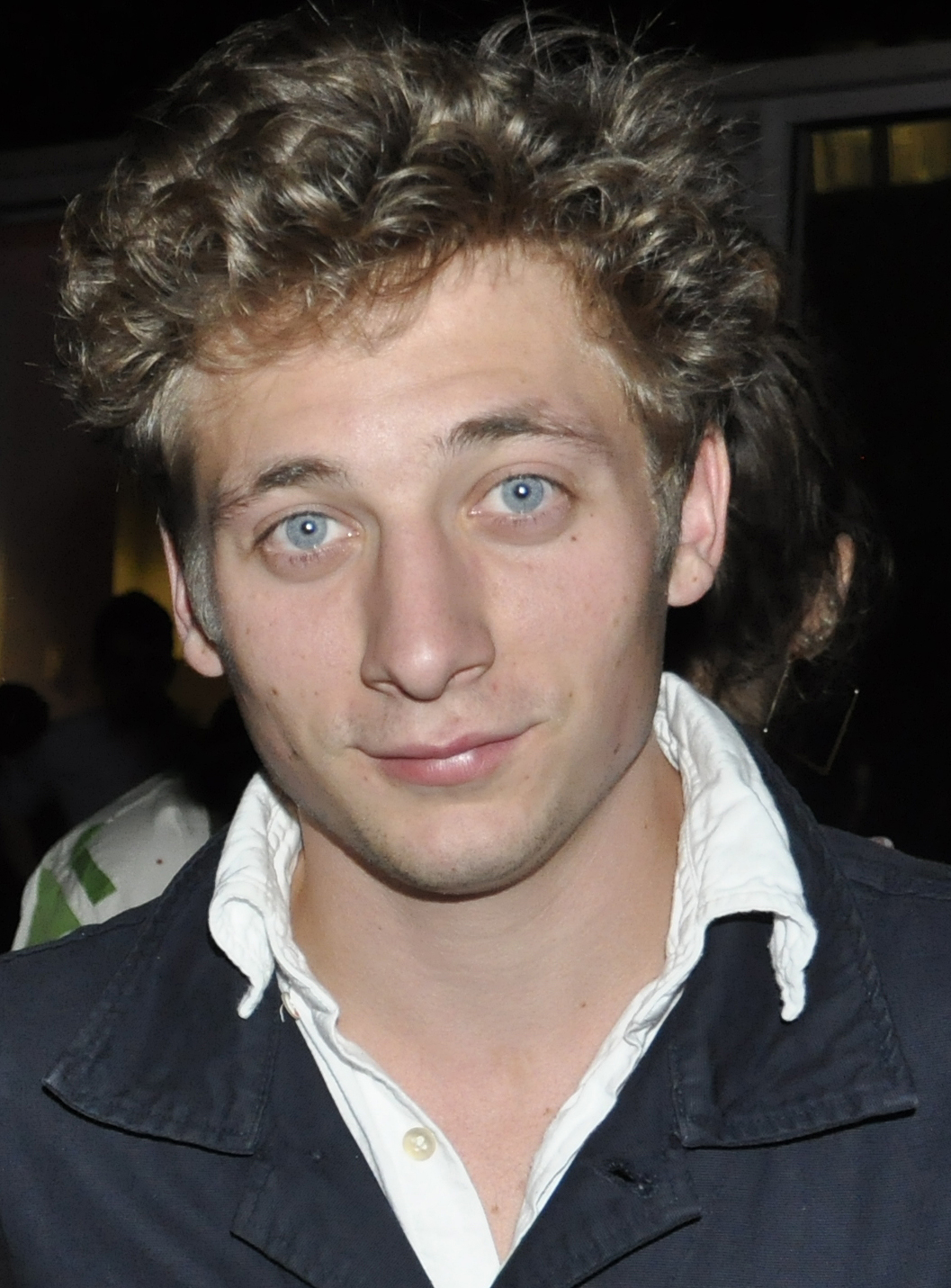
White in 2013

White made his professional acting debut in 2006, with small roles in the film Beautiful Ohio and the television series Conviction. In 2007, White starred in the independent film The Speed of Life. Premiering at the Venice Film Festival, the film won the Queer Lion award for best LGBTQ-related film at the festival. In 2008, White appeared in the film Afterschool directed by Antonio Campos. The film premiered at the 2008 Cannes Film Festival. White had minor roles in series Law & Order and Law & Order: Special Victims Unit in three episodes between them in 2007, 2008, and 2010.

White received his breakthrough role in the comedy-drama series Shameless as Lip Gallagher, the eldest son of the dysfunctional Gallagher household. He was cast shortly after graduating from the PPAS. White received positive reviews for the role, with Rolling Stone noting there was a "powerful stillness" to his performance. White portrayed the character in 134 episodes between 2011 and 2021. For his performance, White received a nomination at the 2014 Critics' Choice Television Awards for Best Supporting Actor in a Comedy Series. While filming the show, White also made appearances in several films, including a five-line part as a period juvenile delinquent in You Can't Win (filmed in May 2012, released direct-to-video in February 2026), Rob the Mob (2014), After Everything (2018), and actor Dave Franco's directorial debut, The Rental (2020). After the show's end, White recalled being in an "upsetting head space" and had doubts on whether he could act outside of the show.

=== 2022–2024: Stardom with The Bear ===
In 2022, White began his first TV leading role in the Hulu series The Bear. He plays the troubled New York chef Carmen "Carmy" Berzatto, who returns to his hometown of Chicago to save his deceased brother's failing restaurant. To prepare for the role, he attended classes at the Institute of Culinary Education (ICE) alongside his co-star, Ayo Edebiri. White received acclaim for his performance. Variety described it as the "vibrating" center of the show, praising his portrayal of Berzatto's inner turmoil. The Guardian described his performance as "career-making" and praised White's casting, and NPR described it as "searing" and "palpable". The role has won him two Critics' Choice Television Awards for Best Actor in a Comedy Series, three Golden Globe Awards for Best Actor in a Television Series Musical or Comedy, two Screen Actors Guild Awards for Outstanding Performance by a Male Actor in a Comedy Series, and two Primetime Emmy Awards for Outstanding Lead Actor in a Comedy Series.

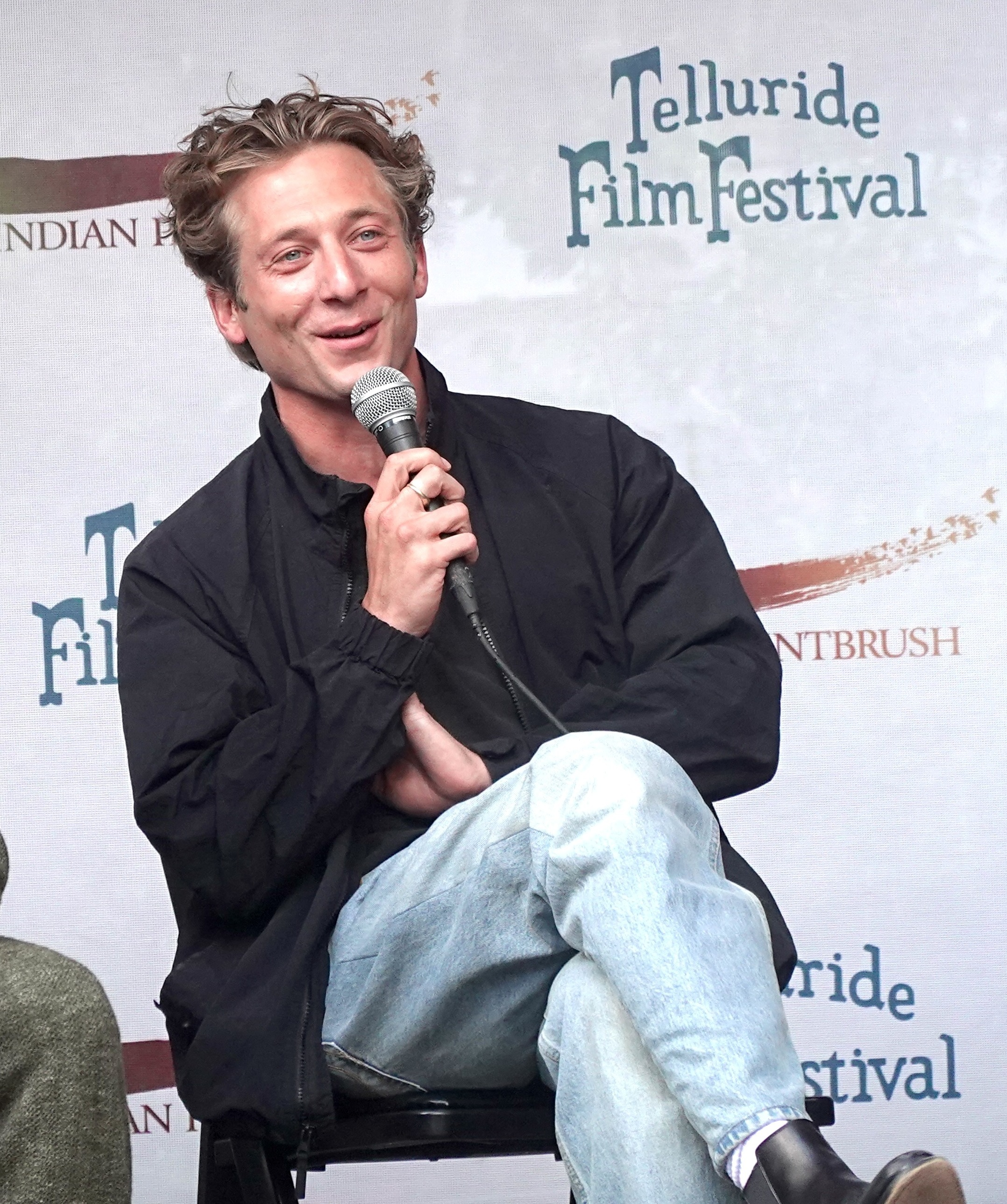
White at the 2025 Telluride Film Festival

In 2023, White portrayed wrestler Kerry Von Erich in the biographical sports film The Iron Claw. In preparation for the role, White was trained by professional wrestler Chavo Guerrero. His performance earned him positive reviews, with The Hindu calling it "riveting", and Rolling Stone calling him "a hell of an actor". In January 2024, White became a global ambassador for Calvin Klein underwear. For its online campaign, he wore the brand's Spring 2024 men's underwear collection, and the advertisement generated $12.7 million in media impact value in less than 48 hours. In August, White's second campaign with the brand was released, with him wearing the Fall and Winter 2024 collection.

=== 2025–present: Film roles ===
In 2025, White starred as musician Bruce Springsteen in the biopic Springsteen: Deliver Me from Nowhere, written and directed by Scott Cooper. Based upon the eponymous book by Warren Zanes, the film chronicles Springsteen's journey toward completing his 1982 album, Nebraska. White took vocal lessons and learned to play the guitar for the role, using a 1955 Gibson J-200 guitar that Springsteen had given him. On making the film, White said: "I never felt like I could necessarily pat myself on the back in any way. It was ongoing. I'm visiting Bruce at a very strange, lonely, sad time in his life so I tried to stay as close to those sorts of feelings as I could. The process of making the movie wasn’t for me one of joy necessarily. I wouldn't allow myself to feel like I ever got it because so much of this story and period is about a kind of doubt and fear and the future."

In 2026, White starred as Rotta the Hutt in the Star Wars film The Mandalorian and Grogu, having taken the part due to a lack of prior voice work and also wanting to make something his children could watch. The fifth and final season of The Bear was confirmed in July 2025, and principal filming took place in Chicago from January to March. On June 25, 2026, the fifth season premiered. The series ran for 47 episodes, of which White appeared in 43. White portrayed Wall Street Journal reporter Jeff Horwitz in The Social Reckoning, Aaron Sorkin's sequel to The Social Network (2010). White will also co-star opposite Austin Butler in the A24 thriller film Enemies. He will begin filming The Painted Bride, directed by Jeremiah Zagar, in August 2026 in Poland.

== Personal life ==
White married his Afterschool costar Addison Timlin on October 18, 2019, at a courthouse in Beverly Hills, California after announcing their engagement the preceding April. The two met in high school, when they were both 14 years old, and later acted together in Afterschool, when they were 17. Timlin officially separated from him on September 1, 2022 and later filed for divorce in Los Angeles in May 2023, after three and a half years of marriage. They have two daughters, born in October 2018 and December 2020. Actress Dakota Johnson is the godmother of both children.

After separating from Timlin, White dated Spanish singer Rosalía. The pair broke up in mid-2024.

== Filmography ==
Key
†	Denotes films that have not yet been released

=== Film ===
Year	Title	Role	Notes	Ref.
2006	Beautiful Ohio	Young Clive		
2007	The Speed of Life	Sammer		
2007	Aquarium	David		
2008	The Fourth	Ryan	Short film; writer; producer	
2008	Afterschool	Dave		
2009	Gloria & Eric	Eric	Short film	
2010	Twelve	Charlie		
2012	The Time Being	Gus		
2013	Movie 43	Kevin Miller	Segment: "Homeschooled"	
2013	Bad Turn Worse	Bobby		
2014	Rob the Mob	Robert Uva		
2017	Chasing You	Ben	Short film	
2018	After Everything	Elliot		
2018	Cornflower	Ladle	Short film	
2020	The Rental	Josh		
2020	Viena and the Fantomes	Freddy		
2021	The Birthday Cake	Tommaso		
2023	Fremont	Daniel		
2023	Fingernails	Ryan		
2023	The Iron Claw	Kerry Von Erich		
2025	Springsteen: Deliver Me from Nowhere	Bruce Springsteen		
2026	You Can't Win	Smiler	Direct-to-video; filmed in 2012.	
2026	The Mandalorian and Grogu	Rotta the Hutt (voice)		
2026	The Social Reckoning	Jeff Horwitz		
TBA	Enemies †		Post-production	
TBA	Peaked †		Post-production; Cameo	
TBA	The Painted Bride †		Post-production	

=== Television ===
Year	Title	Role	Notes	Ref.
2006	Conviction	Jack Phelps	Episode: "Deliverance"	
2007–2008	Law & Order	Jeremy	Episode: "Melting Pot"	
2007–2008	Law & Order	Andy Steel	Episode: "Driven"	
2010	Law & Order: Special Victims Unit	Michael Parisi	Episode: "Torch"	
2011–2021	Shameless	Philip "Lip" Gallagher	Main role; 134 episodes	
2018	Homecoming	Shrier	4 episodes	
2022–2026	The Bear	Carmen "Carmy" Berzatto	Lead role; 43 episodes	

== Awards and nominations ==
Organizations	Year	Category	Work	Result	Ref.
AACTA International Award	2024	Best Actor in a Series	The Bear	Won	
Critics' Choice Television Awards	2014	Best Supporting Actor in a Comedy Series	Shameless	Nominated	
Critics' Choice Television Awards	2023	Best Actor in a Comedy Series	The Bear (season one)	Won	
Critics' Choice Television Awards	2024	Best Actor in a Comedy Series	The Bear (season two)	Won	
Golden Globe Awards	2022	Best Actor in a Television Series – Musical or Comedy	The Bear (season one)	Won	
Golden Globe Awards	2023	Best Actor in a Television Series – Musical or Comedy	The Bear (season two)	Won	
Golden Globe Awards	2024	Best Actor in a Television Series – Musical or Comedy	The Bear (season three)	Won	
Golden Globe Awards	2026	Best Actor in a Television Series – Musical or Comedy	The Bear (season four)	Nominated	
Golden Globe Awards	2026	Best Actor in a Motion Picture – Drama	Springsteen: Deliver Me from Nowhere	Nominated	
Golden Raspberry Awards	2014	Worst Screen Combo (shared with the entire cast)	Movie 43	Nominated	
Primetime Emmy Awards	2023	Outstanding Lead Actor in a Comedy Series	The Bear (episode: "Braciole")	Won	
Primetime Emmy Awards	2024	Outstanding Lead Actor in a Comedy Series	The Bear (episode: "The Bear")	Won	
Primetime Emmy Awards	2025	Outstanding Lead Actor in a Comedy Series	The Bear (episode: "Tomorrow")	Nominated	
Santa Barbara International Film Festival	2026	Virtuoso Award	Springsteen: Deliver Me from Nowhere	Won	
Satellite Awards	2023	Best Actor in a Drama / Genre Series	The Bear (season one)	Nominated	
Satellite Awards	2024	Best Actor – Television Series Musical or Comedy	The Bear (season two)	Won	
Satellite Awards	2025	Best Actor – Television Series Musical or Comedy	The Bear (season three)	Nominated	
Screen Actors Guild Awards	2022	Outstanding Male Actor in a Comedy Series	The Bear (season one)	Won	
Screen Actors Guild Awards	2022	Outstanding Ensemble in a Comedy Series (shared with the entire cast)	The Bear (season one)	Nominated	
Screen Actors Guild Awards	2023	Outstanding Male Actor in a Comedy Series	The Bear (season two)	Won	
Screen Actors Guild Awards	2023	Outstanding Ensemble in a Comedy Series (shared with the entire cast)	The Bear (season two)	Won	
Screen Actors Guild Awards	2024	Outstanding Male Actor in a Comedy Series	The Bear (season three)	Nominated	
Screen Actors Guild Awards	2024	Outstanding Ensemble in a Comedy Series (shared with the entire cast)	The Bear (season three)	Nominated	
Screen Actors Guild Awards	2025	Outstanding Ensemble in a Comedy Series (shared with the entire cast)	The Bear (season four)	Nominated	
Television Critics Association Awards	2023	Individual Achievement in Comedy	The Bear (season one)	Nominated	
Television Critics Association Awards	2024	Individual Achievement in Comedy	The Bear (season two)	Nominated	
