= Joanna Calo =

American television writer and director

- Born: 1980 (age 45–46); San Francisco, CA
- Occupations: Director, writer, producer
- Years active: 2013–present
- Children: 2
- Awards: Emmy; Producers Guild; Independent Spirit; Writers Guild

Joanna Calo is an American writer, director and producer. The showrunner of The Bear, her credits as a writer and executive producer include the television series Hacks, BoJack Horseman, The Baby-Sitters Club and the film Thunderbolts*.

Calo has won a Primetime Emmy Award, three Writers Guild of America Awards, an Independent Spirit Award, and a Producers Guild Award.

== Early life and personal life ==
Calo was born in San Francisco, California, and grew up in New Jersey. She and her husband have two children. They live in Los Angeles, California.

== Career ==
Calo is known for her showrunner role on The Bear. She credits her prior work on BoJack Horseman as having taught her about character and season arcs.

== Filmography ==
=== TV series ===
Year	Title	Director	Writer	Producer	Notes
2013	Save Me	No	Yes	No	
2014	Happyland	No	Yes	No	
2014	Benched	No	Yes	No	
2016–2020	BoJack Horseman	No	Yes	Co-executive	
2017	Girlboss	No	Yes	Co-producer	
2019	Undone	No	Yes	Co-executive	
2020	The Baby-Sitters Club	No	Yes	Co-executive	2 episodes
2021	Hacks	No	Yes	Co-executive	
2022–2026	The Bear	Yes	Yes	Executive	
2022	Lost Ollie	No	Yes	Co-executive	
2023	Beef	No	Yes	No	1 episode

=== Consulting producer ===
- Tuca & Bertie (2019)
- Beef (2023)

=== Film writer ===
- Thunderbolts* (2025)
