= Barinholtz =

Barinholtz is a surname. Notable people with the surname include:

- Alan Barinholtz (born 1952 or 1953), American attorney and actor
- Ike Barinholtz (born 1977), American actor and comedian
- Jon Barinholtz (born 1982), American actor, comedian, and producer
