= Shermann Thomas =

American TikToker

Shermann "Dilla" Thomas is an American TikToker and self-taught historian who first became known for leading historic walking tours of Chicago.

He first became interested in history from his father, a former Chicago police officer who refused to use expressways as a protest against the impact their construction had on Black communities. While initially only leading walking tours, in October 2022 Thomas successfully raised money to purchase a tour bus and start a company, Chicago Mahogany Tours. The Washington Post described him as being part of a growing trend of BIPOC travel experts parlaying social media success into real-world careers.

In February of 2022, WCIU-TV aired a television special titled "Black History Verified" hosted by Thomas. He is currently working with Netflix and Chris Witaske to develop a Chicago-based historical fiction series.
