= Carol Mansell =

American film and television actress

- Occupation: Actress

Carol Mansell is an American film and television actress, best known for her first television role: Ethel MacDoogan (aka Angel 972), the main character in the sitcom Down to Earth, running on WTBS from 1984 to 1987.

After the cancellation of Down to Earth, Mansell has mainly appeared in individual television episodes. Her recurring roles include parts in Married... with Children, Seinfeld, That '70s Show, Desperate Housewives, Days of Our Lives, The King of Queens, and a 2012 episode of Justified. She also appeared in the Season 9 episode of Friends "The One in Barbados Part 1" as a fan of Joey's. Her most prominent film role is as Collette Marshall in the 2000 biopic/horror film In the Light of the Moon. Other film appearances include those in The Couch Trip and Thelma & Louise. She has also appeared in the audio drama Adventures in Odyssey playing the character of “Eleanor Wise”.

== Filmography ==
| Year | Title | Role | Notes |
|---|---|---|---|
| 1988 | The Couch Trip | Mrs. Blair | |
| 1991 | Thelma & Louise | Waitress | |
| 1992 | Seinfeld | The Bubble Boy's Mother | |
| 1998 | Zack and Reba | Nelly Stokes | |
| 1999 | The Settlement | Bookstore Cashier | |
| 1999 | That '70s Show | Mary | |
| 2000 | That '70s Show | Timmy's Mom | |
| 2000 | Hanging Up | Woman Who Recognizes Maddy | |
| 2000 | In the Light of the Moon | Collette Marshall | |
| 2002 | Ted Bundy | Mrs. Myers | |
| 2003 | Friends | Joey's fan | TV series, 1 episode |
| 2005 | Duck | Frances Pratt | |
| 2005 | Break a Leg | 'Phillip's Way' Casting Director | |
| 2005 | The King Of Queens | Betty | |
| 2012 | Janeane from Des Moines | Bible Study Group #3 | |
| 2014 | Walk of Shame | Charon | |
| 2015 | Goldie & Bear | Gingerbread Witch | TV series, voice |
| 2017 | Better Call Saul | Martha | |
| 2017 | Fall | Rose | TV series, 1 episode |
| 2018 | A Series of Unfortunate Events | Elder Jemma | TV series, 3 episodes |
| 2019 | Carol's Second Act | Mrs. Zahn | TV series, 1 episode |
| 2019 | Young Sheldon | Mrs. Krawcynski | TV series, 1 episode |
| 2021 | The Ultimate Playlist of Noise | Aunt Delilah | - |
| 2021 | American Auto | Faye | TV series, 1 episode |
| TBA | One Attempt Remaining † | TBA | Filming |
