= Alan Barinholtz =

American attorney and actor

- Born: April 23, 1951 (age 75); United States
- Education: Ohio State University (BFA), Loyola University Chicago (JD)
- Occupations: Attorney; actor
- Known for: Jury Duty
- Relatives: Ike Barinholtz (son); Jon Barinholtz (son); Michael Feinstein (first cousin once removed)

Alan Barinholtz (born April 23, 1951) is an American attorney and actor best known for appearing as Judge Alan Rosen in the reality hoax sitcom Jury Duty (2023). On August 14, 2024, he and his son, Ike, became the first duo and the second celebrities overall to win the $1,000,000 top prize for their charity, the ASL Program at Los Encinos School, and the fifteenth overall million dollar winners on Who Wants to Be a Millionaire.

== Early life and education ==
Barinholtz grew up in Skokie, and attended Evanston High School. He majored in theater at Ohio State University. With years of experience in improvisation and standup, he dreamed of becoming an actor and performing musical comedy in New York City. After graduation, Barinholtz moved to New York City to work for a brief time before coming home to Chicago, where he tried a variety of jobs, first directing a children's theater group, and, later, doing phone sales.

While trying to figure out his next career move, Barinholtz met with a friend who was attending law school. Barinholtz was not interested in practicing law but thought a Juris Doctor would be great for business purposes. He was accepted to the Loyola University Chicago School of Law on the day his eldest son, actor Ike Barinholtz, was born. On his first day of law school, Barinholtz was so inspired by Dean Charles W. Murdock’s speech—that lawyers improved society—that he decided then and there to become a practicing attorney.

== Career ==
Barinholtz started his legal career as an associate at a general practice firm where he practiced for two years. He then entered into a partnership which was limited to personal injury, including representing various owners and operators within the trucking industry. He later entered private practice creating, the Law Offices of Alan Barinholtz, P.C., where Barinholtz continued litigation. He represented both the plaintiffs and defendants in matters concerning litigation involving personal injury, product liability, and medical malpractice. He also represented individuals and corporations in actions concerning professional malpractice, contract disputes, civil rights and class action suits.

Barinholtz has practiced before the Circuit Court of Cook County, the Federal Trial Bar, the Illinois Human Rights Commission, the Illinois Department of Financial and Professional Regulation, the American Arbitration Association, and the Illinois Appellate Court. Licensed in Ohio since 2010, Barinholtz has also appeared before the U.S. District Court, Southern District of Ohio. In 2013, he tried a case in the Federal District Court of Northern Illinois, Eastern District to a $3 million plus verdict. Barinholtz has been an arbitrator for AAA for over 25 years, as well as acting as a hearing officer in Cook County Mandatory Arbitration and typically as a neutral in three member panel arbitrations.

Barinholtz continued to perform improv on stage in Chicago when visited by his sons. To cast the role of Judge Alan Rosen, Jury Duty searched for a retired or semi-retired lawyer or judge with improv experience. During this time Barinholtz was visiting his sons in Los Angeles for Thanksgiving, and the trio had mutual friends who was the sister of the showrunner, who recommended him. From the encouragement of his sons, Barinholtz shot a one-minute audition tape, portraying a fictional judge and talking off the top of his head. Three weeks later, he got the formal offer, which he mulled over with his family. Barinholtz was initially concerned that obstacles such as moving from Chicago to Los Angeles and joining SAG would be too much. However, his sons encouraged him that he would be crazy to pass up this opportunity. In the wake of the show's success Barinholtz has said, "In my wildest dreams, I never imagined that it would take off the way it has taken off, For the life of me I don’t think anyone thought it would catch fire like it did."

Barinholtz has since landed an agent, joined SAG, and subsequently appeared in Apple TV’s Physical and in the NBC pilot St. Denis Medical.

== Personal life ==
Barinholtz is married to Peggy Barinholtz. Together they have two sons, actors Ike and Jon.

Barinholtz is Jewish. His sons attended Bernard Zell Anshe Emet Day School, the Jewish school associated with a Conservative synagogue in Chicago, until eighth grade.

Barinholtz's mother, Miriam Feinstein Barinholtz, is a cousin of pianist Michael Feinstein.

In 2024, the University of Illinois College of Law's chapter of the American Constitution Society hosted Barinholtz as a speaker.

== Filmography ==
=== Television ===
Year	Title	Role	Notes
2018	The Oath	Sheldon	
2020–24	Who Wants to Be a Millionaire	Self	2 episodes
2023	History of the World, Part II	Barker	1 episode
2023	Physical	Dr. Gilchrist	1 episode
2023	Jury Duty	Judge Alan Rosen	8 episodes
2024	St. Denis Medical	Mr. Schroeder	1 episode
2025	From Buckingham Palace	David Lovejoy	Post-production
2025	Running Point	Bernie Berger	1 episode
2025	The Studio	Projectionist	1 episode

=== Film ===
Year	Title	Role	Notes
TBA	One Attempt Remaining †	TBA	Filming
