= Jamie Ding =

American game show contestant

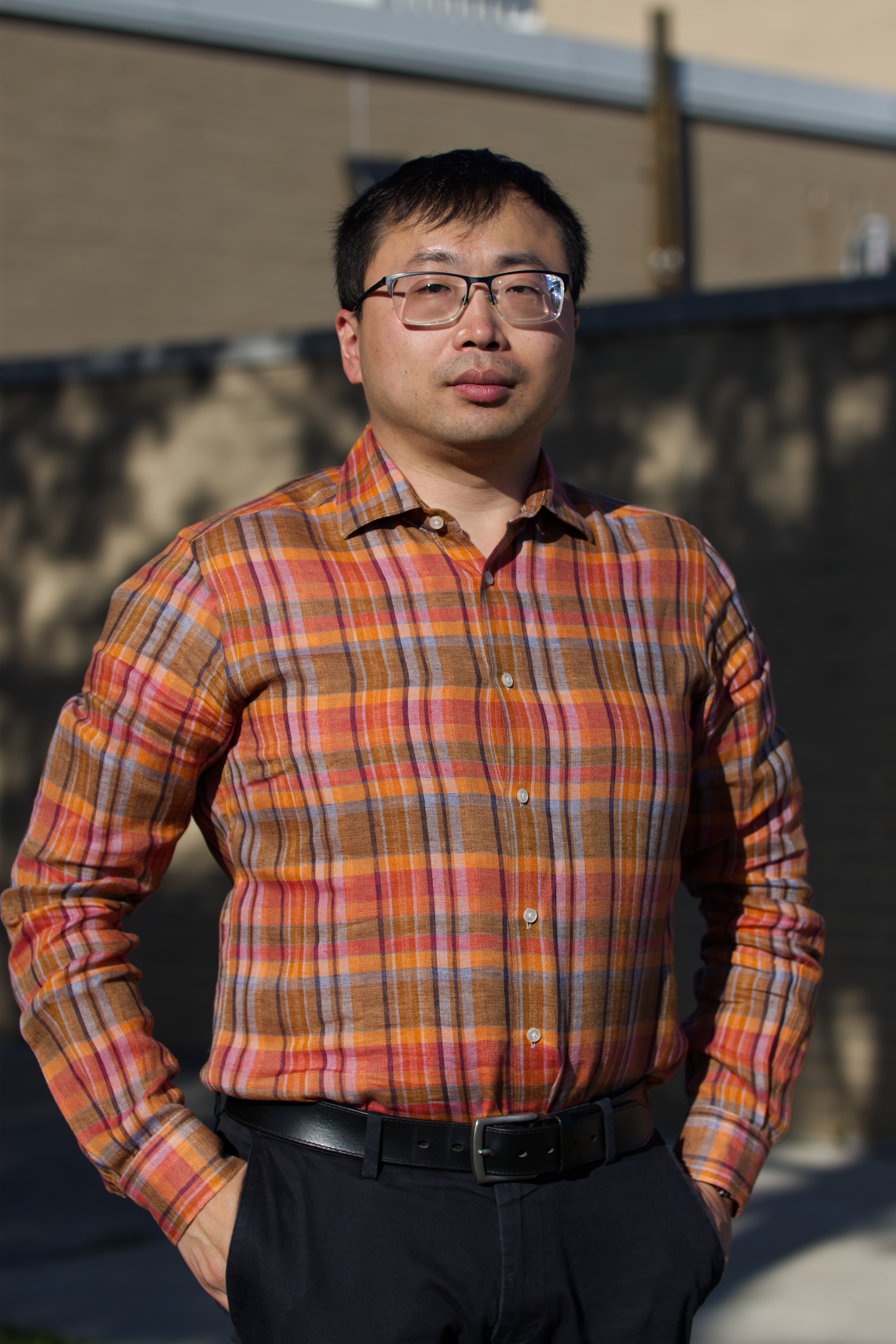
- Ding in 2026
- Born: May 1, 1992 (age 34); Canberra, Australia
- Occupations: Government employee, law student
- Known for: 31-game winning streak on Jeopardy!

Jamie Ding (born May 1, 1992) is a New Jersey state government employee, law student and former game show contestant.

Ding won 31 consecutive games on Jeopardy! before he finally lost in April 2026 with $882,605 in winnings and the fifth-longest winning streak in the show's history.

He is known for wearing sweater outfits with orange, the school color of his alma mater, Princeton University.

On July 29, 2026, he and Ben Affleck became the fourth duo and the fifth celebrities overall to win the $1,000,000 top prize for their charity, Eastern Congo Initiative, and the eighteenth overall million-dollar winners on Who Wants to Be a Millionaire.

To date, Ding is the sixteenth highest-earning game show contestant of all time, having accumulated a total of $1,385,605 on his game show appearances.

== Early life and education ==
Born in Canberra, Australia on May 1, 1992, Ding is the son of a neuroscience professor and a high school math teacher who are immigrants from China. He grew up in Grosse Pointe Shores, a suburb of Detroit, Michigan and graduated from Grosse Pointe North High School in 2009.

As a student, he competed in geography bees and on his high school quiz bowl team. He lost a sixth-grade spelling bee when he misspelled the word "bolero" as "ballero."

He graduated from Princeton in 2013 with a degree in molecular biology and worked on The Daily Princetonian in multimedia.

As of 2026, Ding has attended Seton Hall University School of Law, under a program in which classes are held every other weekend.

== Career ==
Ding works as program administrator for the New Jersey Housing and Mortgage Finance Agency, where he helps administer tax credits to build affordable housing in the state.

He has been part of an effort seeking to block the U.S. Department of Justice from obtaining New Jersey's voter registration records.

== Jeopardy! ==
Ding was not a regular Jeopardy! viewer until shortly before he started competing, though he had taken the Jeopardy! online qualification test several times despite not being a regular viewer. He was then asked to audition in November 2024, over Zoom, and was cast, which triggered an intense bout of studying.

In his third episode, he set a new record for the highest Coryat score in Jeopardy! history at $42,400. In his 20th episode, he tied the record held by Ken Jennings for the most correct responses in one game at 45. In his 32nd and final episode, he wrote a farewell note for his final Jeopardy! answer that read: "TTFN," short for "ta ta for now."

== Personal life ==
Ding has stated that his favorite color is orange, his favorite letter is F and his favorite number is 6.

His hobbies include constructing cryptic crosswords; running an Instagram account rating General Tso's chicken with his sister, a lawyer named Jessie Ding; chasing eclipses; writing in italics; and driving around with his trivia friends looking for rare geese.

He lives in the census-designated place of Lawrenceville in Lawrence Township, Mercer County, New Jersey.
