= Chicago Party Aunt =

American adult animated comedy series

- Genre: Adult animation; Animated sitcom
- Created by: Chris Witaske; Jon Barinholtz; Katie Rich
- Based on: The character by Chris Witaske
- Voices of: Lauren Ash; Rory O'Malley; RuPaul Charles; Jill Talley; Ike Barinholtz; Jon Barinholtz; Bob Odenkirk; Da'Vine Joy Randolph; Katie Rich; Chris Witaske; Matt Craig
- Music by: Nathan Whitehead
- Country of origin: United States
- Original language: English
- No. of seasons: 1 (2 parts)
- No. of episodes: 16

Production
- Executive producers: Matt Craig; Jon Barinholtz; Katie Rich; Chris Witaske; Ike Barinholtz; David Stassen; Will Gluck; Richard Schwartz; Chris Prynoski; Antonio Canobbio; Ben Kalina
- Producer: Whitney Loveall
- Editor: Matt Steinauer
- Running time: 22–28 minutes
- Production companies: Titmouse, Inc.; Olive Bridge Entertainment; 23/34

Original release
- Network: Netflix
- Release: September 17, 2021 – December 30, 2022

Chicago Party Aunt is an American animated sitcom created by Chris Witaske, Jon Barinholtz, and Katie Rich for Netflix. Inspired by Witaske's Twitter account, the series follows the antics of a middle-aged sports-loving woman sharing an apartment with her 18-year-old nephew.

== Voice cast ==
- Lauren Ash as Diane Dunbrowski, the titular Aunt and life of the party, who avoids adulting and works as a hairdresser, formerly at Chi City Sports Cuts and Clips, now called Borough
- Rory O'Malley as Daniel Whiddington, Diane's 18-year-old gay nephew who decides to take a gap year living with his aunt instead of going to Stanford University
- Chris Witaske as Kurt Kosinski, Diane's second-time ex-husband who works as a TSA agent at Midway International Airport
- Jon Barinholtz as Mikey, Diane and Kurt's big son who also works at Midway International Airport as a baggage handler
- Jill Talley as Bonnie Whiddington, Diane's sister and Daniel's mother
- Ike Barinholtz as Mark Whiddington, Bonnie's husband and Daniel's father
- RuPaul Charles as Gideon, the new manager at Borough, rebranded from Chi City Sports Cuts and Clips
- Da'Vine Joy Randolph as Tina, one of Diane's co-workers at Borough and a part-time makeup artist
- Katie Rich as Zuzana, one of Diane's co-workers at Borough and an Eastern European immigrant
- Bob Odenkirk as Feather, the proprietor of Kreativ Jus, a trendy coffeehouse where Daniel works part-time

== Production ==
=== Development ===
On July 27, 2021, Netflix gave a 16-episode series order to Chicago Party Aunt. The series is created by Chris Witaske, Jon Barinholtz, and Katie Rich inspired by the eponymous Twitter account by Witaske. Witaske, Barinholtz, and Rich were expected to executive produce alongside Ike Barinholtz, David Stassen, Will Gluck, Richard Schwartz, Chris Prynoski, Antonio Canobbio, and Ben Kalina. The production companies involved with the series are 23/34, Olive Bridge Entertainment, and Titmouse, Inc.

=== Casting ===
Upon series order announcement, it was reported that the voice cast includes Lauren Ash, Rory O'Malley, RuPaul Charles, Jill Talley, Ike Barinholtz, Jon Barinholtz, Da'Vine Joy Randolph, Rich, and Witaske.

== Release ==
Chicago Party Aunt was released in two parts, with the first eight episodes on September 17, 2021, and the remaining eight episodes on December 30, 2022.

== Reception ==
Part 1 of Chicago Party Aunt received generally mixed reviews from critics. The review aggregator website Rotten Tomatoes reported a 43% approval rating with an average rating of 7.50/10, based on 7 critic reviews. Metacritic gave the series a weighted average score of 56 out of 100 based on 4 critics, indicating "mixed or average reviews". For Part 1, Daniel Fienberg from The Hollywood Reporter stated that "too often the show consists of local references, funny pronunciations, and then a semisweet ending that fails to land convincingly." Reviewing the series for Chicago Sun-Times, Richard Roeper gave a rating of 3/4 stars and said, "The fun-loving reveler from Twitter is surrounded by so many lovable characters, we can forgive all the Fridge and Malort references."

Part 2 received more positive reviews. Rendy Jones from Paste stated that while the show needs more laughs and suffers from the same problems a lot of Netflix adult animation has, and Diane's raunchy behavior is retained, "the episodic plots organically test her ability to mature and embrace change in her life. I don't think I've seen an adult animated series follow a woman's attempt to find affordable healthcare so she can get a breast implant removal surgery procedure done to better her health, and I give this show kudos for approaching that humorously and thoughtfully." Andrew Munnik from Comic Book Resources stated that Part 2 is "blazing a new trail for LGBT+ representation in television." Johnny Loftus from Decider recommends Part 2, stating that "it's easy, especially with such a low-intensity run-time. Chicago Party Aunt generates some laughs with its feel for the city's slang. But it's the toon's consistently excellent voice cast that really keeps it in the game."

== Episodes ==
No.	Title	Directed by	Written by	Original release date
Part 1
1	"Chicago Party Aunt"	Joey Adams	Chris Witaske & Jon Barinholtz & Katie Rich	September 17, 2021
2	"Helicopter Aunt"	Anna Hollingsworth	Jon Barinholtz	September 17, 2021
3	"Ribs for Her Pleasure"	Andy Thom	Katie Rich	September 17, 2021
4	"Tailgate Jailgate"	Joey Adams	Jessica Lamour	September 17, 2021
5	"Halloweener Circle"	Anna Hollingsworth	Ike Barinholtz & David Stassen	September 17, 2021
6	"Twenty-Six Point Tattoo"	Andy Thom	Emily Walker & Mike Kosinski	September 17, 2021
7	"The Beefys"	Joey Adams	Chris Witaske	September 17, 2021
8	"Emergency Contact"	Anna Hollingsworth	Theresa Mulligan Rosenthal	September 17, 2021
Part 2
9	"Doppel Änger"	Andy Thom	Theresa Mulligan Rosenthal	December 30, 2022
10	"St. Patrick's Day"	Joey Adams	Jon Barinholtz	December 30, 2022
11	"Go Scratch"	Andy Thom	Chris Witaske	December 30, 2022
12	"Swing and a Ms."	Anna Hollingsworth	Mike Kosinski & Emily Walker	December 30, 2022
13	"Empire State of Mind"	Joey Adams	Jessica Lamour	December 30, 2022
14	"Tits Up, Tits Out"	Anna Hollingsworth	Katie Rich	December 30, 2022
15	"Breaking Balm"	Andy Thom	Amy Schwartz	December 30, 2022
16	"Lotion Commotion"	Joey Adams	Chris Witaske & Jon Barinholtz & Katie Rich	December 30, 2022
