= Pete Katinsky =

Fictional character, The Bear TV series

- The Bear character
- Chris Witaske as Pete in "Hands"
- First appearance: "Hands"; June 23, 2022
- Last appearance: "The Original Beef of Chicagoland"; June 25, 2026
- Created by: Christopher Storer
- Portrayed by: Chris Witaske

In-universe information
- Occupation: Lawyer
- Family: Donna Berzatto (mother-in-law); Carmy Berzatto (brother-in-law); Mikey Berzatto (brother-in-law, deceased)
- Spouse: Natalie Berzatto (wife)

Pete Katinsky is a fictional character on the FX Network television series The Bear, played by Chris Witaske. Pete is the husband of Natalie Berzatto (Abby Elliott), a lawyer by profession and temperamentally much gentler than the sometimes fractious Berzattos.

== Casting ==
Pete is played by Chris Witaske, a Chicago native. Before trying out for The Bear, Witaske knew Chris Storer as a "cool Chicago guy" who was "Gillian's boyfriend." Witaske originally auditioned for the part of Richie. Witaske has described his character as "golden retriever-ass Pete."

== Biography ==
Pete Katinsky is Natalie's kind and loving husband. When Pete is first introduced, he appears to be "universally disliked by the family, [but] he turns out to be just a big softie—perhaps naive to the others' hardened ways, but charming because of his kind manner and willingness to look for the best in everyone." He was bullied by the male Berzattos for many years after he married Sugar, but Pete proved himself time and time again, demonstrating that "it takes a real man to face the Berzattos, let alone marry one."

In season 1, Pete was introduced in "Hands" and Carmy apologized for his part in some past injury to Pete.

Pete defended Carmy's career and bragged about his success to the cackling Uncle Frank in "Dogs," so that by the time of "Sheridan," Carmy confessed sheepishly to Nat, "I do kinda like Pete now." Carmy still keeps his brother-in-law's contact information under the original disrespectful designation "Sugar's boyfriend (Pete?)." Richie and Cicero still seem to find Pete annoying. As one character analysis put it, "Everyone hates Pete because he's the polar opposite of their family, and they know that Sugar deliberately chose him because of that."

Trying to be a good guest, Pete brought an eighth fish to Seven Fishes. Witaske quipped in 2025 that the tuna casserole was "my mom's recipe."

Pete works as a lawyer and helps the family with contracts for the restaurant. In the season 3 episode "Ice Chips," Pete was out of town at a trial when Natalie went into labor with the first child, so her mom Donna sat with Nat at the hospital until Pete could arrive. Following the arrival of their daughter Sophie, the couple are blissfully happy. When Pete tells Nat he saw Francie at the gym, he's wearing a T-shirt from Nectar's in Burlington, Vermont, which is the bar where the band Phish got its start. Chris Witaske has been to over 100 Phish shows.

He found out at Tiffany Jerimovich's wedding to Frank that his wife had once had a romance with Francie Fak, and handled the news with grace: "Given the intensity and duration of the feud, Pete knows just how emotional it is for Sugar, and instead of asking his wife lewd questions about the encounter or her sexuality, he lends validity to the potential romantic feelings that may have existed between the two. Where bisexuality is often tokenized, rationalized as a phase, seen as a spectacle, or blamed on drunkenness, Pete wants to confirm that his wife's feud isn't founded on long-standing romantic resentment. It's kind of brilliant and touching and absolutely vulnerable all at once."

== See also ==
- List of The Bear characters
- List of The Bear episodes
- Food of The Bear
- Music on The Bear
- Family on The Bear
- Bibliography of The Bear
