= Who Wants to Be a Millionaire (American game show) =

American television game show

- Genre: Game show
- Based on: Who Wants to Be a Millionaire? by: David Briggs; Mike Whitehill; Steven Knight
- Developed by: Michael Davies
- Directed by: Mark Gentile (1999–2002); Matthew Cohen (2002–2010); Rob George (2010–2013); Brian McAloon (2013–2014); Rich DiPirro (2014–2017); Ron de Moraes (2017–2019); Julia Knowles (2020); Joe DeMaio (2020–2021); Russell Norman (2024–present)
- Presented by: Regis Philbin; Meredith Vieira; Cedric the Entertainer; Terry Crews; Chris Harrison; Jimmy Kimmel
- Music by: Keith Strachan (1999–2010, 2020–present); Matthew Strachan (1999–2010, 2020–present); Jeff Lippencott (2010–2019); Mark T. Williams (2010–2019)
- Country of origin: United States
- Original language: English
- No. of seasons: Prime-time, Philbin's era: unspecified (Note: • original run (1999–2002): broadcast over 3 television seasons: in August 1999, November 1999, full 2000 and 2001, irregularly in 2002 up to June; also divided into 6 or 8 mini-seasons, • Super Millionaire (2004), • 10th Anniversary (2009)); Syndication: 17; Prime-time, Kimmel's era: 5 (Note: 1. 20th Anniversary (2020), 2. 2020/2021 season, 3. 25th Ann. (2024), 4. Summer 2025 season; 5. 2026 season)
- No. of episodes: Prime-time: 436 (Note: As of October 28, 2026. • original run (1999–2002): 364, • Super Millionaire (2004): 12, • 10th Ann. (2009): 11, • Kimmel's era: 49); Syndication: 3,010

Production
- Executive producers: Michael Davies (1999–2010, 2020–present); Paul Smith (1999–2007); Leigh Hampton (2003–2010); Rich Sirop (2010–2014); James Rowley (2014–2019); Jimmy Kimmel (2020–present); Mike Richards (2020)
- Production locations: ABC Television Center; New York, New York (1999–2013); Metropolis Studios; New York, New York (2013–2014); Connecticut Film Center; Stamford, Connecticut (2014–2016); Caesars Entertainment Studios; Las Vegas, Nevada (2016–2019); Sony Pictures Studios; Culver City, California (2020–present)
- Running time: Prime-time: ca. 40–43 minutes (Note: In 1999 episodes usually lasted ca. 22 minutes.); Syndication: ca. 20 minutes
- Production companies: Valleycrest Productions (1999–2021); Celador (1999–2007); 2waytraffic (2007–2019); Embassy Row (2020–present); Kimmelot (2020–present); Buena Vista Television (1999–2007); Disney–ABC Domestic Television (2007–2015); Disney–ABC Home Entertainment and Television Distribution (2015–2019); Sony Pictures Television (Note: Format rights holder; distributor in India (2020))

Original release
- Network: ABC
- Release: August 16, 1999 – June 27, 2002
- Network: Syndication
- Release: September 16, 2002 – May 31, 2019
- Network: ABC
- Release: February 22 – May 25, 2004
- Release: August 9 – August 23, 2009
- Release: April 8, 2020 – March 21, 2021
- Release: July 10, 2024 – present

Who Wants to Be a Millionaire (colloquially referred to as simply Millionaire (Note: The simplified title is often used by hosts and in promotional materials.)) is an American television game show based on the format of the same-titled British program created by David Briggs, Steven Knight and Mike Whitehill and developed in the United States by Michael Davies. The show features a quiz competition with contestants attempting to win a top prize of $1,000,000 by answering a series of multiple-choice questions, usually of increasing difficulty. The program has endured as one of the longest-running and most successful international variants in the Who Wants to Be a Millionaire? franchise.

The show has had numerous format and gameplay changes over its runtime and, since its debut, twelve contestants and four separate teams of two contestants (twenty people combined, seven of which were celebrities) have answered all the questions correctly and won the top prize (two other contestants also won one million dollars in special editions of the show). As the first American network game show to offer a million-dollar top prize, the show made television history by becoming one of the highest-rated game shows in the history of American television. The American Millionaire won seven Daytime Emmy Awards, and TV Guide ranked it No. 6 in its 2013 list of the 60 greatest game shows of all time.

== Gameplay ==
=== Core rules ===
Screenshot illustrating how question text and answer choices appear on-screen

At its core, the game is a quiz competition in which the goal is to correctly answer a series of 15 (14 from 2010–2019) consecutive multiple-choice questions. The questions are of increasing difficulty, except in the 2010–15 format overhaul, where the contestants were faced with a round of 10 questions of random difficulty, followed by a round of four questions of increasing difficulty. Each question is worth a specific amount of money; the amounts are not cumulative. Many questions from number 6 onward often prompt the host to ask if the answer they gave is their "final answer" – if it is, then it is locked in and cannot be changed. If at any time the contestant gives a wrong answer, the game is over and the contestant's winnings are reduced to $0 for tier-one questions, $1,000 for tier-two questions, and $32,000 for tier-three questions. However, the contestant may choose to walk away after being presented with a question, allowing them to keep all the money they have won to that point; afterwards (in most cases) the host will usually ask them to state what answer they would have gone for if they had continued, and reveal if it would have been correct or incorrect. With the exception of the shuffle format, upon correctly answering questions five and ten, contestants are guaranteed at least the amount of prize money associated with that level.

Contestants giving an incorrect answer see their winnings drop down to the last milestone achieved. From the show's launch in 1999–2010 and again from 2015–2017, a contestant would leave with nothing if they answered a question incorrectly before reaching the first milestone. In the shuffle format, which from 2010–2015, contestants who incorrectly answered a question had their winnings reduced to $1,000 in round one and $25,000 in round two, regardless of how far they had progressed into the game. Beginning in 2017, contestants answering a question incorrectly before reaching the first milestone question would leave with $1,000, even if the incorrect question is worth a lower amount. For celebrities playing in the syndicated version, the minimum guarantee for their nominated charities is $10,000. Beginning in 2020, all contestants are guaranteed $32,000 either for themselves or for their chosen charities, even if the incorrect question is worth a lower amount (from 2020 to 2021, the show featured a hybrid of celebrity and non-celebrity contestants, though the show became celebrity-exclusive when it returned in July 2024).

=== Format history ===
==== Original format (1999–2008; 2020–present) ====
From 1999–2002, 10 contestants played a round of Fastest Finger to determine who played next. The participants were presented with one question and four answers and attempted to put the four answers in a certain order (ascending, chronological, etc.) in the fastest time. The contestant who did so correctly in the fastest time played. If no contestant got the correct order, the round was played again, and when a tie occurred, the tied participants answered a second Fastest Finger question. This round was removed when the syndicated version began in 2002, though it returned in 2004 for Super Millionaire. The format remained unchanged, except for changes to the money staircase and the addition of a new lifeline, until 2008. When the show returned to ABC in 2020, the original format used from 1999–2004 was used, albeit with slightly different lifelines and the Fastest Finger round once again being removed.

The guaranteed amounts for correctly answering questions five and ten were $1,000 and $32,000, respectively, for the entirety of the network run and the syndicated version from 2002 to 2004. The Super Millionaire specials in 2004 had guarantees of $5,000 and $100,000, respectively. Beginning in 2004 on the syndicated version, the upper guarantee was decreased to $25,000 at the same time a fourth lifeline was added; the 10th Anniversary specials also followed suit.

==== Clock format (2008–2010) ====
In 2008, the format was altered to include a time limit on each question. The amount of time for each question was as follows:

- Questions 1–5: 15 seconds
- Questions 6–10: 30 seconds
- Questions 11–14: 45 seconds
- Question 15: 45 seconds, plus the total of all unused time from the previous 14 questions

Unlike past formats, the four answer options would be revealed simultaneously, and the timer would begin to run immediately afterward (while the host was still reading the answers). The contestant had to give a final answer before the timer reached 0. The timer temporarily paused if the contestant used a lifeline and restarted once the lifeline ended. If time ran out, the game ended and the contestant left with whatever money they had won up to that point, in the same manner as walking away. However, because contestants cannot walk away while using the Double Dip lifeline, running out of time during Double Dip would instead be treated as a wrong answer and the contestant's winnings would be reduced to the last safety net. (Using the Double Dip lifeline during the clock format would stop the clock during the first answer and resume it during the second answer.)

While the clock format was in use, the contestant was also shown the categories of all 15 questions in the order they were to be asked.

For the first season of the clock format, the guarantees for answering questions five and ten were $1,000 and $25,000. For the final season, the lower guarantee was increased to $5,000, commensurate with a change in the money tree. In August 2009, Fastest Finger returned for the 10th Anniversary primetime special. Fastest Finger has not been used on the American version of Millionaire since then.

==== Shuffle format (2010–2015) ====
The format was overhauled in September 2010, splitting the game into two rounds. The first round consisted of 10 questions, each in a different category and worth a different amount from $100 to $25,000. Both the category order and the amounts were randomized at the start of the game, with the latter hidden from the contestant's view (from 2014, the categories to the questions were no longer presented to the contestant). The difficulty level and value of each question were not tied to one another. The value of each question was revealed only after the contestant answered it correctly or chose to jump (skip) it; a correct answer added the money to the contestant's bank, while a jump put the value out of play. The maximum bank from this round was $68,600. If the contestant missed a question in the first round, they left with $1,000, even if their bank was lower than this total. Choosing to walk away allowed the contestant to keep half their bank.

The second round presented four questions of increasing difficulty in the traditional format, each of which augmented the contestant's total winnings to a set value. A miss in this round reduced their winnings to $25,000, while choosing to walk away allowed the contestant to keep all winnings accumulated thus far. Categories for these questions were not given ahead of time.

From 2011–2014, some weeks were "Double Your Money" weeks, in which one first-round question was randomly designated as being worth double its value. The maximum potential bank from this round thus became $93,600.

Beginning in this format (in 2010) and lasting until 2019 was the audience contestant round. If a regular contestant left the game close to the end of a half-hour episode and there was not enough time to introduce a new contestant, a randomly selected audience member would be invited to answer one question with no lifelines. A correct answer would display "Thousandaire" on-screen (Note: Added from the 2013 season onward. From 2010–2013, it would display the usual "$1,000".) and the audience contestant would win a $1,000 prize.

==== Classic Resurgence format (2015–2019) ====
With the hiring of new host Chris Harrison, the format was changed once again to resemble that of the original Millionaire format. Each contestant faces 14 general-knowledge questions of increasing difficulty, with no time limit or information about the categories.

The guaranteed amounts for correctly answering questions five and ten were $5,000 and $50,000 respectively. Originally, contestants who failed to clear the first five questions won nothing. However, beginning in 2017, a contestant who missed any of the first five questions left with $1,000, even if the missed question was of a lower value.

=== Payout structure ===
Five different ladders have been used over the course of the series (bold values indicate guarantees):

Question number	Question value				
Question number	1999–2004; 2020–present	2004–2009	2009–2010	2010–2015	2015–2019
1	$100		$500	Random values $100, $500, $1,000, $2,000, $3,000, $5,000, $7,000, $10,000, $15,000, and $25,000	$500
2	$200		$1,000	Random values $100, $500, $1,000, $2,000, $3,000, $5,000, $7,000, $10,000, $15,000, and $25,000	$1,000
3	$300		$2,000	Random values $100, $500, $1,000, $2,000, $3,000, $5,000, $7,000, $10,000, $15,000, and $25,000	$2,000
4	$500		$3,000	Random values $100, $500, $1,000, $2,000, $3,000, $5,000, $7,000, $10,000, $15,000, and $25,000	$3,000
5	$1,000		$5,000	Random values $100, $500, $1,000, $2,000, $3,000, $5,000, $7,000, $10,000, $15,000, and $25,000	$5,000
6	$2,000		$7,500	Random values $100, $500, $1,000, $2,000, $3,000, $5,000, $7,000, $10,000, $15,000, and $25,000	$7,000
7	$4,000		$10,000	Random values $100, $500, $1,000, $2,000, $3,000, $5,000, $7,000, $10,000, $15,000, and $25,000	$10,000
8	$8,000		$12,500	Random values $100, $500, $1,000, $2,000, $3,000, $5,000, $7,000, $10,000, $15,000, and $25,000	$20,000
9	$16,000		$15,000	Random values $100, $500, $1,000, $2,000, $3,000, $5,000, $7,000, $10,000, $15,000, and $25,000	$30,000
10	$32,000	$25,000		Random values $100, $500, $1,000, $2,000, $3,000, $5,000, $7,000, $10,000, $15,000, and $25,000	$50,000
11	$64,000	$50,000		$100,000	
12	$125,000	$100,000		$250,000	
13	$250,000			$500,000	
14	$500,000			$1,000,000	
15	$1,000,000				

The $500,000 and $1,000,000 prizes were initially lump-sum payments, but were changed to annuities in September 2002 when the series moved to syndication. Contestants winning either of these prizes receive $250,000 thirty days after their show broadcasts and the remainder paid in equal annual payments. Winners of $500,000 also receive $25,000 per year for 10 years, while $1,000,000 prize winners also receive $37,500 per year for 20 years; all prizes are subject to taxes.

From 2017 to 2019, contestants who answered one of the first five questions incorrectly received a $1,000 consolation prize. On the original primetime version and in earlier seasons of the syndicated version prior to 2010 (and again from 2015 to 2017), contestants who missed one of the first five questions left with nothing.

=== Lifelines ===
Forms of assistance known as "lifelines" are available for a contestant to use if a question proves difficult. Multiple lifelines may be used on a single question, but each one can only be used once per game (unless otherwise noted below). Three lifelines are available from the start of the game. Depending on the format of the show, additional lifelines may become available after the contestant correctly answers the fifth or tenth question. In the clock format, usage of lifelines temporarily pauses the clock while the lifelines are played.

- +1 (2014–2019): The contestant may invite a friend onstage from the audience to assist with the current question. After the question result, the friend must return to the audience.
- 50:50 (1999–2008, 2015–2019, 2020–present): Two incorrect answers are eliminated, leaving the contestant with a choice between the correct answer and one remaining incorrect answer.
- Ask the Audience (1999–2019, 2024–present): The audience members individually use four-button keypads to register the answer they believe is correct, and the percentage of votes for each answer is then shown to the host, contestant, and home viewer. Beginning in 2004 and ending in 2006, AIM users who added the screen name MillionaireIM to their buddy list and were online were able to receive and register answers they believed to be correct to Ask the Audience questions in real-time; these results were then shown as a separate chart to the contestant. Ask the Audience was removed in April 2020 due to the COVID-19 pandemic but returned in July 2024.
- Ask the Expert (2008–2010): Based on Three Wise Men, the lifeline was earned after answering five questions correctly until 2010, when it was given to the contestant immediately following the removal of Phone a Friend. The contestant was connected to an expert via a video call, using Skype, and the two could discuss the question with no time limit.
- Ask the Host (2020–present): Introduced during the 2020 season, this lifeline allows the contestant to ask for the host's advice on the current question and give the best possible answer. If used and the contestant answers, both the contestant and host do not see the correct answer until the computer reveals it.
- Double Dip (2004, 2008–2010): First used during Super Millionaire, this lifeline allowed a contestant to make a second guess at the answer if his/her first one was wrong. The contestant had to invoke the lifeline before making the first guess, and it was removed from play regardless of which guess was correct. In addition, the contestant could not walk away from the question after invoking the lifeline. It was used in the main series from 2008 to 2010, replacing 50:50.
- Jump the Question (2010–2015): This lifeline allowed the contestant to skip the current question, but the money associated with it was removed from play. It could be used twice per game from 2010 to 2014, but only once from 2014 to 2015. It could not be used on the million dollar question (where it would have been pointless).
- Phone a Friend (1999–2010, 2020–present): The contestant calls a pre-arranged friend and is given 30 seconds to discuss the question with that person. Until mid-2003 (and during the 2009 primetime special), the lifeline was sponsored by AT&T. In 2010, this lifeline was dropped due to an increasing use of search engines by the friends to look up answers. The lifeline returned in 2020.
- Switch/Cut the Question (2004–2008): Earned after answering 10 questions, this lifeline allowed a contestant to discard the current question and replace it with one of the same value. The contestant was shown the correct answer to the original question before the switch and any lifelines used on the original question were not reinstated. It was occasionally used from 2014 to 2019 during 'Whiz Kids' week and was available from the outset.
- Three Wise Men (2004): Used during Super Millionaire, this lifeline allowed the contestant 30 seconds of advice from a panel of three experts, who were sequestered backstage and saw the question only when their help was requested. At least one expert was female, and at least one was a former million-dollar or $500,000 winner on Millionaire.
- The 2020 season features a lifeline similar to +1, replacing Ask the Audience. This lifeline is offered to the contestant after the tenth question and allows them to consult with their accompanying supporter one time during the final five questions. However, in order to obtain this lifeline, the contestant must exchange one of his or her other remaining lifelines. The contestant has unlimited access to their supporter for the first ten questions. This feature was eliminated in 2024, due to two celebrities now playing together as a team.

One lifeline has also appeared only during special weeks:

- Crystal Ball (2012–2013): Used for certain weeks (such as Halloween Week) during the "shuffle" format as a special fourth lifeline. This lifeline allowed the contestant to see the randomized money value of the current question before making a decision to answer, jump it (if Jump the Question was available), or walk away. It could not be used on the 10th – 14th questions, whose money values would already be known.

=== Top prize winners ===
Over the course of the program's history, there have been sixteen instances out of eighteen overall where contestants have answered all fifteen questions correctly and walked away with the top prize (the winners include twelve individual contestants and four separate teams of two players; twenty out of twenty-two contestants combined):

- John Carpenter – Won on November 19, 1999. Carpenter was the first contestant worldwide to win the top prize, and also became the first and (to date) only American contestant to win the top prize with lifelines to spare, having only used the Phone-a-Friend lifeline on the million-dollar question, in which he "faked" his usage by calling his dad to tell him that he's going to win the million. He later returned in Champions Edition, in which he won $250,000.
- Dan Blonsky – Won on January 18, 2000. Blonsky later returned in Champions Edition, in which he won $1,000.
- Joe Trela – Won on March 23, 2000. Trela later returned in Champions Edition, in which he won $1,000.
- Bob House – Won on June 13, 2000.
- Kim Hunt – Won on July 6, 2000.
- David Goodman – Won on July 11, 2000.
- Kevin Olmstead – Won on April 10, 2001. Because the jackpot was set to increase by $10,000 each episode, Olmstead won $2,180,000 – making him the biggest winner in television history at the time.
- Bernie Cullen – Won on April 15, 2001.
- Ed Toutant – Won on September 7, 2001. Toutant originally appeared on January 31, 2001, when the jackpot was at $1,860,000 when he was ruled out after answering his $16,000 question wrong, leaving him with $1,000 after having initially won $8,000, thus losing $7,000 with the wrong answer. However, it was determined that there was an error in the question, so he was invited back and began with a new $16,000 question. Toutant went on to win the jackpot as it was at the time of his first appearance. He was the last contestant to win the top prize during Regis Philbin's tenure as host, and the last in the original primetime version of Millionaire.
- Kevin Smith – Won on February 18, 2003, as the first top prize winner on the syndicated version of Millionaire, and the first during Meredith Vieira's tenure as host.
- Nancy Christy – Won on May 8, 2003, as the second top prize winner on the syndicated version. Christy became the first woman in Millionaire history to win the top prize, and proved to be the only female winner for more than two decades; a record she held until Kate Flannery won in September 2025.
- David Chang – Won on November 29, 2020. Chang became the first contestant in 17 years to win $1 million by correctly answering all questions and the first contestant in 11 years to win $1 million (following Sam Murray's win on the Million Dollar Tournament of Ten in November 2009). Chang is also the first top prize winner on the primetime revival and the first celebrity in the history of Millionaire to win the top prize during Jimmy Kimmel's tenure as host, winning $1,000,000 for his charity, Southern Smoke Foundation, with the help of Mina Kimes via the Phone-a-Friend lifeline on the million-dollar question and Alan Yang as his supporter. An extended version of Chang's run was released on Hulu on May 28, 2021.
- Ike and Alan Barinholtz – Won on August 14, 2024. The Barinholtzes became the second top prize winners on the primetime revival and the second celebrities to win the top prize, splitting $500,000 each for their same charity, the ASL Program at Los Encinos School. Their win would mark the first time in the history of the US version of Millionaire that a team of two contestants win the top prize. Ike also previously won $125,000 for his charity, Uplift Family Services, on April 22, 2020.
- Ken Jennings and Matt Damon – Won on July 30, 2025. Jennings and Damon became the third top prize winners on the primetime revival and the third celebrities to win the top prize, splitting $500,000 each for their same charity, Water.org. Although it was initially believed that Jennings and Damon did not use their Phone-a-Friend lifeline on the show (meaning that it would've been the second time in the American version of Millionaire that the top prize was won with lifelines to spare), it was later revealed that they did use the lifeline in the same fashion that John Carpenter did on the million-dollar question, in which they "faked" their usage by calling Brad Rutter to tell him that they're going to win the million, however this was cut due to time constraints, but it was later revealed in the extended version of their run that he "helped" them. Jennings also previously won $100,000 on November 17, 2014. An extended version of Jennings and Damon's run was aired on September 23, 2026.
- Oscar Nuñez and Kate Flannery – Won on September 25, 2025. Nuñez and Flannery became the fourth top prize winners on the primetime revival and the fourth celebrity contestants to win the top prize, splitting $500,000 each for their respective charities, Planned Parenthood and Philabundance. In addition, Flannery became the second woman to win the top prize (after Nancy Christy's win in May 2003).
- Jamie Ding and Ben Affleck - Won on July 29, 2026. Ding and Affleck became the fifth top prize winners on the primetime revival and the fifth celebrity contestants to win the top prize, splitting $500,000 each for their same charity, Eastern Congo Initiative. An extended version of Ding and Affleck's run was aired on September 23, 2026.

In addition, the following two individual contestants won at least $1 million, though not by answering fifteen questions correctly:

- Robert Essig – Won on February 23, 2004. Essig answered twelve of a possible fifteen questions correctly and left with $1,000,000 out of a possible $10,000,000 during Super Millionaire.
- Sam Murray – Won on November 20, 2009. Two weeks prior, Murray appeared as a contestant on the standard show and won $50,000, which earned him the #8 position during the Million Dollar Tournament of Ten. Coincidentally, Murray was the last contestant to play for a spot in the Million Dollar Tournament of Ten, with his standard episode airing on November 6, 2009. While Murray had correctly answered his million-dollar question on November 11, 2009, giving him the tournament lead, he officially won the prize money nine days later, when the remaining contestants chose to walk away with their winnings (see below for more information). Murray was the third and final contestant to win the top prize on the syndicated edition of Millionaire.

== Personnel ==
=== Hosts ===
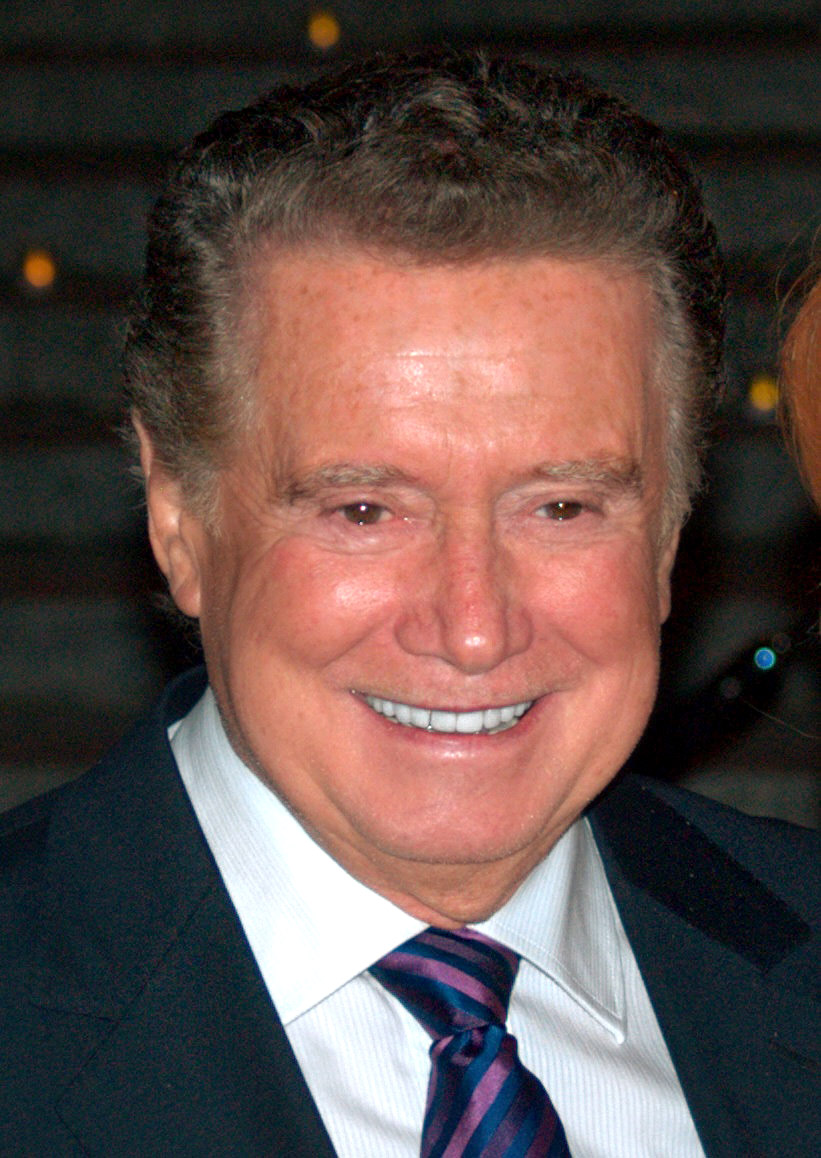
Regis Philbin, host of the original network version

The original network version of the American Millionaire and the subsequent primetime specials were hosted by Regis Philbin. During development stages of the syndicated version, the production team felt that it was not feasible for Philbin to continue hosting—as the show recorded four episodes in a single day—and that the team was looking for qualities in a new host, including someone who was willing to root for them. Rosie O'Donnell was initially offered a hosting position on this new edition, but declined the opportunity almost immediately. Eventually, Meredith Vieira, who had previously competed in a celebrity charity event on the original network version, was named host of the new syndicated edition, and she began hosting in September 2002. Three months before, Philbin hosted a final retrospective clip show titled "The Final Answer", which aired on June 27, 2002 and ended the original series.

ABC originally offered Vieira hosting duties on the syndicated Millionaire to sweeten one of her re-negotiations for the network's daytime talk show The View, which she was moderating at the time. When the show was honored by GSN on its Gameshow Hall of Fame special, Vieira herself further explained her motivation for hosting the syndicated version as follows:

I did the show because I fell in love with the show, and really, first and foremost, as a parent, [I feel that] there aren't that many shows on television that you can watch as a family. And when Michael Davies approached me and said, "Would you be interested in hosting the syndicated version?", I said, "Just point me toward the contract! I am so there!"

From 2006 to 2011, when Vieira was concurrently working as a co-host of Today, guest hosts appeared in the second half of each season of the syndicated version. Guest hosts who filled in for Vieira included Philbin, Al Roker, Tom Bergeron, Tim Vincent, Dave Price, Billy Bush, Leeza Gibbons, Cat Deeley, Samantha Harris, Shaun Robinson, Steve Harvey, John Henson, Sherri Shepherd, Tim Gunn, and D. L. Hughley.

On January 10, 2013, Vieira announced that after eleven seasons with the syndicated Millionaire, she was leaving the show as part of an effort to focus on other projects in her career. She finalized taping of her last episodes with the show in November 2012. On January 11, 2013, one day after Vieira's announcement, it was announced that Regis Philbin was considering returning to host Millionaire; ultimately, however, he decided not to. Cedric the Entertainer was introduced as Vieira's successor when season twelve premiered on September 2, 2013. On April 30, 2014, Deadline announced that Cedric had decided to leave the show in order to lighten his workload, resulting in him being succeeded by Terry Crews for the 2014–15 season. Crews was succeeded by Chris Harrison, then host of The Bachelor and its spin-offs, when season 14 premiered on September 14, 2015. Harrison remained on the show until the syndicated edition ended in May 2019.

On January 8, 2020, a twentieth anniversary revival of the show was announced, with late-night talk show host Jimmy Kimmel as host and co-executive producer. In March 2020, Philbin was invited to the new Millionaire studio at Sony Pictures Studios in Culver City, California, to take a look at the new set and talk to Kimmel about his tenure on the show, as part of ABC News' special documentary, Who Wants to Be a Millionaire?: Secrets & Surprises, which aired on April 6, 2020. This was Philbin's last appearance on Millionaire before his death on July 25, 2020.

=== Production staff ===
The original executive producers of the American Millionaire were British television producers Michael Davies and Paul Smith, the latter of whom undertook the responsibility of licensing Millionaire to American airwaves as part of his effort to transform the British program into a global franchise. Smith served until 2007 and Davies until 2010; additionally, Leigh Hampton (previously co-executive producer in the later days of the network version and in the syndicated version's first two seasons) served as an executive producer from 2004 to 2010. Rich Sirop, who was previously a supervising producer, became the executive producer in 2010 and held that position until 2014, when he left Millionaire to hold the same position with Vieira's newly launched syndicated talk show, and was replaced by James Rowley. Vincent Rubino, who had previously been the syndicated Millionaire's supervising producer for its first two seasons, served as that version's co-executive producer for the 2004–05 season, after which he was succeeded by Vieira herself, who continued to hold the title until her departure in 2013 (sharing her position with Sirop for the 2009–10 season).

Producers of the network version included Hampton, Rubino, Leslie Fuller, Nikki Webber, and Terrence McDonnell. For its first two seasons the syndicated version had Deirdre Cossman for its managing producer, then Dennis F. McMahon became producer for the next two seasons (joined by Dominique Bruballa as his line producer), after which Jennifer Weeks produced the next four seasons of syndicated Millionaire shows, initially accompanied by Amanda Zucker as her line producer, but later joined for the 2008–09 season by Tommy Cody (who became sole producer in the 2009–10 season). The first 65 shuffle format episodes were produced by McPaul Smith, and from 2011 onward, the title of producer was held by Bryan Lasseter. The network version had Ann Miller and Tiffany Trigg for its supervising producers; they were joined by Wendy Roth in the first two seasons, and by Michael Binkow in the third and final season. After Rubino's promotion to co-executive producer, the syndicated version's later supervising producers included Sirop (2004–09), Geena Gintzig (2009–10), Brent Burnette (2010–12), Geoff Rosen (2012–14), and Liz Harris (2014–16), who was the show's last co-executive producer.

The original network version of Millionaire was directed by Mark Gentile, who later served as the syndicated version's consulting producer for its first two seasons; he went on to serve as the director of Duel (which ran on ABC from December 2007 to July 2008) and Million Dollar Password (which aired on CBS from June 2008 to June 2009). The syndicated version was directed by Matthew Cohen from 2002 to 2010, by Rob George from 2010 to 2013, and by Brian McAloon in the 2013–14 season. Former The Price Is Right director Rich DiPirro (who later directed Mental Samurai) became Millionaire's director in 2014, and was replaced after the 2016–17 season by Ron de Moraes, who remained as director until the show's cancellation.

In the 2020 reboot, Davies returned as co-executive producer, alongside host Jimmy Kimmel and Mike Richards, with the latter leaving the position following the first season.

== Production ==
The American version of Millionaire was a co-production of 2waytraffic, a division of Sony Pictures Television, and Valleycrest Productions, a division of The Walt Disney Company. 2waytraffic purchased Millionaire's original production company Celador in 2006, while Valleycrest remained throughout the show's history, and holds the copyright on all American Millionaire episodes to date. The show was distributed by Valleycrest's corporate sibling Disney-ABC Home Entertainment and Television Distribution (previously known as Buena Vista Television and later known as Disney-ABC Domestic Television). In the 2020 reboot, Sony Pictures Television subsidiary Embassy Row, Jimmy Kimmel's production company Kimmelot, and Valleycrest Productions (for the reboot's first two seasons) co-produced the show, with Sony Pictures Television, the rights holder to the format, as the show's distributor in India in the reboot's first season, in which it was being streamed on Sony LIV, owned by subsidiary Sony Pictures Networks, in that country.

The American Millionaire was taped at ABC's Television Center East studio on the Upper West Side of Manhattan in New York from 1999 to 2013. Tapings were moved to NEP Broadcasting's Metropolis Studios in East Harlem in 2013, and production moved to the Connecticut Film Center in Stamford, Connecticut the following year. In 2016, production relocated to Bally's Hotel and Casino in Las Vegas. Episodes of the syndicated version were produced from June to December. The show originally taped four episodes in a single day, but that number later changed to five. The 2020 reboot was taped at Sony Pictures Studios in Culver City, California.

=== Origins ===
When the American version of Millionaire was first conceived in 1998, Michael Davies was a young television producer who was serving as the head of ABC's little-noticed reality programming division (at a time when reality television had not yet become a phenomenon in America). At that time, ABC was lingering in third place in the ratings indexes among American broadcast networks, and was on the verge of losing its status as one of the "Big Three" networks. Meanwhile, the popularity of game shows was at an all-time low, and with the exception of The Price Is Right, the genre was absent from networks' daytime lineups at that point. Having earlier created Debt for Lifetime Television and participated with Al Burton and Donnie Brainard in the creation of Win Ben Stein's Money for Comedy Central, Davies decided to create a primetime game show that would save the network from collapse and revive interest in game shows.

Davies originally considered reviving CBS's long-lost quiz show The $64,000 Question, with a new home on ABC. However, this effort's development was limited as when the producer heard that the British Millionaire was about to make its debut, he got his friends and family members in the United Kingdom to record the show, and subsequently ended up receiving about eight FedEx packages from different family members, each containing a copy of Millionaire's first episode. Davies was so captivated by everything that he had seen and heard, from host Chris Tarrant's intimate involvement with the contestant to the show's lighting system and music tracks, that he chose to abandon his work on the $64,000 Question revival in favor of introducing Millionaire to American airwaves, convinced that it would become extraordinarily popular.

When Davies presented his ideas for the American Millionaire to ABC, the network's executives initially rejected them, so he resigned his position there and became an independent producer. Determined to bring his idea for the show to fruition, Davies decided to bet his career on Millionaire's production, and the first move that he made was planning to attach a celebrity host to the show. Along with Philbin, a number of other popular television personalities were considered for hosting positions on the US Millionaire during its development, including Peter Jennings, Bob Costas, Phil Donahue, and Montel Williams, but among those considered, it was Philbin who wanted the job the most, and when he saw an episode of the British Millionaire and was blown away by its content, Davies and his team ultimately settled on having him host the American show. When Davies approached ABC again after hiring Philbin, the network finally agreed to accept the American Millionaire. With production now ready to begin, the team had only five months to finish developing the show and get it launched, with Davies demanding perfection in every element of Millionaire's production.

=== Audition process ===
With few exceptions, any legal resident of the United States who was 18 years of age or older had the potential of becoming a contestant through Millionaire's audition process. Those ineligible included employees, immediate family or household members, and close acquaintances of SPE, Disney, or any of their respective affiliates or subsidiaries; television stations that broadcast the syndicated version; or any advertising agency or other firm or entity engaged in the production, administration, or judging of the show. Also ineligible were candidates for political office and individuals who had appeared on a different game show outside of cable that had been broadcast within the past year, was intended to be broadcast within the next year, or had played the main game on any of the American or Canadian versions of Millionaire itself.

Potential contestants of the original prime time version had to compete in a telephone contest which had them dial a toll-free number and answer three questions by putting objects or events in order. Callers had ten seconds to enter the order on a keypad, with any incorrect answer ending the game/call. The 10,000 to 20,000 candidates who answered all three questions correctly were selected into a random drawing in which approximately 300 contestants competed for ten spots on the show using the same phone quiz method. (Note: To qualify for 2004's Super Millionaire spin-off, potential contestants were required to answer five questions. Each person who successfully answered all five questions chose one tape date, and the contestants for that tape date were drawn from that pool.) Accommodations for contestants outside the New York metropolitan area included round trip transportation and hotel accommodations, with airfare being used for contestants who did not hail from the northeastern areas of the country.

The syndicated version's potential contestants, depending on tryouts, were required to pass an electronically scored test comprising a set of thirty questions which had to be answered within a 10-minute time limit. Contestants who failed the test were eliminated, while those who passed were interviewed for an audition by the production staff, and those who impressed the staff the most were then notified by postal mail that they had been placed into a pool for possible selection as contestants. At the producers' discretion, contestants from said pool were selected to appear on actual episodes of the syndicated program; these contestants were given a phone call from staff and asked to confirm the information on their initial application form and verify that they met all eligibility requirements. Afterwards, they were given a date to travel to the show's taping facilities to participate in a scheduled episode of the show. Unlike its ABC counterpart, the syndicated version did not offer transportation or hotel accommodations to contestants at the production company's expense; that version's contestants were instead required to provide transportation and accommodations of their own.

The syndicated Millionaire also conducted open casting calls in various locations across the United States to search for potential contestants. These were held in late spring or early summer, with all dates and locations posted on the show's official website. The producers made no guarantee on how many applicants would be tested at each particular venue; however, the show would not test anymore than 2,500 individuals per audition day.

In cases when the show featured themed episodes with two people playing as a team, auditions for these episodes' contestants were announced on the show's website. Both members of the team had to pass the written test and the audition interview successfully in order to be considered for selection. If only one member of the team passed, he or she was placed into the contestant pool alone and had to continue the audition process as an individual in order to proceed.

=== Music ===
Originally, the American Millionaire carried over the musical score from the British version, composed by father-and-son duo Keith and Matthew Strachan. Unlike older game show musical scores, Millionaire's musical score was created to feature music playing almost throughout the entire show. The Strachans' main Millionaire theme music took some inspiration from the "Mars" movement of Gustav Holst's The Planets, and their question cues from the $2,000 to the $32,000/$25,000 level, and then from the $64,000/$50,000 to $500,000 level, took the pitch up a semitone for each subsequent question, in order to increase tension as the contestant progressed through the game. On GSN's Gameshow Hall of Fame special, the narrator described the Strachan tracks as "mimicking the sound of a beating heart", and stated that as the contestant worked their way up the money ladder, the music was "perfectly in tune with their ever-increasing pulse".

The original Millionaire musical score holds the distinction of being the only game show soundtrack to be acknowledged by the American Society of Composers, Authors and Publishers, as the Strachans were honored with numerous ASCAP awards for their work, the earliest of them awarded in 2000. The original music cues were given minor rearrangements for the clock format in 2008; for example, the question cues were synced to the "ticking" sounds of the game clock.

Even later, the Strachan score was removed from the American version altogether for the introduction of the shuffle format in September 2010, in favor of a new musical score with cues written by Jeff Lippencott and Mark T. Williams, co-founders of the Los Angeles-based company Ah2 Music. This score remained on the show until May 2019, when the syndicated edition of Millionaire was cancelled. When the show returned in April 2020, the original Strachans' score returned, and have been used since.

=== Set ===
The American Millionaire's basic set was a direct adaptation of the British version's set design, which was conceived by Andy Walmsley. Paul Smith's original licensing agreement for the American Millionaire required that the show's set design, along with all other elements of the show's on-air presentation (musical score, lighting system, host's wardrobe, etc.), adhere faithfully to the way in which they were presented in the British version; this same licensing agreement applied to all other international versions of the show, making Walmsley's Millionaire set design the most reproduced scenic design in television history. The original version of the American Millionaire's set cost $200,000 to construct. The American Millionaire's production design was handled at different times by David Weller (1999–2004, 2004–2007), Jim Fenhagen (2004, 2007–2010) and George Allison (2010–2019).

Unlike older game shows whose sets are or were designed to make the contestant(s) feel at ease, Millionaire's set was designed to make the contestant feel uncomfortable, so that the program feels more like a movie thriller than a typical quiz show. From 1999 to 2019, the floor was Plexiglas beneath which laid a huge dish covered in mirror paper. For the 2020 reboot, the plexiglas floor was removed and replaced with walkable digital monitors that displayed gold dollar signs from the show's logo, as well as the gold question marks from the show's international logo, in which the show's on-screen and set graphics were designed by Potion Pictures, the same company behind the on-screen and set graphics design for the British version's 2018 reboot, with additional on-screen graphics provided by Olga van den Brandt, the graphics designer for most of the franchise's international versions, albeit un-credited for the latter.

Before the shuffle format was implemented in 2010, the main game had the contestant and host sit in chairs in the center of the stage, known as "Hot Seats"; these measured 3 feet (0.91 m) high, were modeled after chairs typically found in hair salons, and each seat featured a computer monitor directly facing it to display questions and other pertinent information. Shortly after the shuffle format was introduced to Millionaire, Vieira stated in an interview with her Millionaire predecessor on his morning talk show that the Hot Seat was removed because it was decided that the seat, which was originally intended to make the contestant feel nervous, actually ended up having contestants feel so comfortable in it that it did not service the production team any longer.

The lighting system was programmed to darken the set as the contestant progressed further into the game. There were also spotlights situated at the bottom of the set area that zoomed down on the contestant when they answered a major question; to increase the visibility of the light beams emitted by such spotlights, oil was vaporized, creating a haze effect. Media scholar Dr. Robert Thompson, a professor at Syracuse University, stated that the show's lighting system made the contestant feel as though they were outside of prison when an escape was in progress.

When the shuffle format was introduced, the Hot Seats and corresponding monitors were replaced with a single podium, so that the contestant and host stood throughout the game and were also able to walk around the stage. Also, two video screens were installed–one that displayed the current question in play, and another that displayed the contestant's cumulative total and progress during the game. In September 2012, the redesigned set was improved with a modernized look and feel, in order to take into account the show's transition to high-definition broadcasting, which had just come about the previous year. The two video screens were replaced with two larger ones, having twice as many projectors as the previous screens had; the previous contestant podium was replaced with a new one; and light-emitting diode (LED) technology was integrated into the lighting system to give the lights more vivid colors and the set and gameplay experience a more intimate feel.

The 2020 reboot features the same set as the British version's 2018 reboot, with a minor change. The "Fastest Finger First" podiums were reduced from six to one, which is placed on the left side of the stage and is reserved to the contestant's supporter. It was then later removed due to the return of the studio audience, as two celebrities play together.

== Broadcast history ==
=== Summary ===
The original American version premiered on ABC on August 16, 1999, as part of a two-week daily special event hosted by Regis Philbin. A second two-week event aired in November 1999, after which ABC commissioned a regular series that launched on January 9, 2000, and ran until June 27, 2002. Philbin hosted the entire run of the original network series as well as two additional special event series that aired on ABC in 2004 and 2009.

A daily version of Millionaire produced for syndication began airing on September 16, 2002, and was initially hosted by Meredith Vieira. Cedric the Entertainer took over the show in 2013 following Vieira's departure, with Terry Crews replacing him in 2014. The final host of the syndicated series was Chris Harrison, who took over from Crews in 2015 and hosted until the show was canceled, with the finale airing on May 31, 2019.

On January 8, 2020, seven months after the cancellation was announced, ABC announced that the show would be revived in primetime for a 20th Anniversary season, hosted by Jimmy Kimmel (who is also a co-executive producer of the show) with celebrity contestants. The anniversary season premiered on April 8, 2020, and its success led to the show being renewed for a second season, which premiered on October 18, 2020, with the last episode airing March 21, 2021.

In May 2024, ABC renewed the show for a 25th Anniversary season after a three-year hiatus, premiering on July 10, 2024; ABC subsequently renewed the revival for a fourth season in 2025 and a fifth season in 2026.

=== ABC ===
The American version of Millionaire was launched by ABC as a half-hour primetime program on August 16, 1999. When it premiered, it became the first American network game show to offer a million-dollar top prize to contestants. After airing thirteen episodes and reaching an audience of 15 million viewers by the end of the show's first week on the air, the program expanded to an hour-long format when it returned in November. The series, of which episodes were originally shown only a day after their initial taping, was promoted to regular status on January 9, 2000, and, at the height of its popularity, was airing on ABC five nights a week. The show was so popular during its original primetime run that rival networks created or re-incarnated game shows of their own (e.g., Greed, Twenty-One, etc.), as well as importing various game shows of British and Australian origin to America (such as Winning Lines, Weakest Link, and It's Your Chance of a Lifetime).

The nighttime version initially drew in up to 30 million viewers a day three times a week, an unheard-of number in modern network television. In the 1999–2000 season, it averaged No. 1 in the ratings against all other television shows, with 28,848,000 viewers. In the next season (2000–01), three nights out of the five weekly episodes placed in the top 10 and all five ranked in the top 20. However, the show's ratings began to fall during the 2000–01 season, so that at the start of the 2001–02 season, the ratings were only a fraction of what they had been one year before, and by season's end, the show was no longer even ranked among the top 20. ABC's reliance on the show's popularity led the network to fall quickly from its former spot as the nation's most watched network.

As ABC's overexposure of the primetime Millionaire led the public to tire of the show, there was speculation that the show would not survive beyond the 2001–02 season. The staff planned on switching it to a format which would emphasize comedy more than the game and feature a host other than Philbin, but in the end, the primetime show was canceled, with its final episode airing on June 27, 2002.

On May 8, 2003, following Nancy Christy's million dollar win on the syndicated version of the show, ABC News broadcast footage from Charles Ingram's run on the British version of Millionaire as a special episode of Primetime Thursday with Charles Gibson and Diane Sawyer, called "Who Wants to Steal a Million?"; the documentary was originally broadcast in the United Kingdom on April 21, 2003, as a special episode of Tonight with Trevor McDonald that was presented by Martin Bashir, who was filling in for Trevor McDonald, called "Major Fraud", as in which some of the footage from that particular episode is used. During that program, Ingram was interviewed by Diane Sawyer, who was solely hosting the episode upon Charles Gibson's night off. Both of these were broadcast from the set at Elstree Studios in London.

On January 8, 2020, it was announced that Who Wants to Be a Millionaire would be revived by ABC after an 18-year absence, featuring Jimmy Kimmel host and co-executive producer. The show begin airing on April 8, 2020. Due to the COVID-19 pandemic, the first two seasons of the revival were taped without a studio audience. The series went on indefinite hiatus after the season two finale on March 21, 2021, before returning for a third season on July 10, 2024, with Kimmel returning as host and co-executive producer, and with the return of the studio audience. On April 22, 2025, it was announced that the revival would be renewed for a fourth season, and would once again consist of a pair of two celebrity contestants playing for $1 million. The fourth season premiered on July 23, 2025.

On May 8, 2026, it was announced that the revival had been renewed for a fifth season, which premiered on July 22, 2026.

=== Syndication ===
In 2001, Millionaire producers began work on a half-hour daily syndicated version of the show, with producer Buena Vista Television (BVT) serving as distributor. Originally intended as an accompanying series to the network edition, plans changed after ABC cancelled it; since there was still interest in the property, the syndicated production got enough interest from stations across the country that it was greenlit for the 2002–2003 season.

The syndicated Millionaire premiered on September 16, 2002. Right away, it found itself having similar ratings issues to its former network counterpart. Slow progress in the ratings led to some stations dropping the series outright several months into its first year, while others relocated Millionaire to less than desirable timeslots such as late night. With the series potentially looking at a second cancellation notice within twelve months, a series of moves involving the syndicated series' largest affiliate, the ABC network, and their flagship station resulted in the show getting a reprieve.

When BVT initially sold Millionaire into syndication, the largest market station to come on board was WCBS-TV in New York, the flagship of the CBS network. Looking to bolster its offerings in the two hours between the end of CBS' daytime schedule and its first evening newscast of the day, which had been an ongoing problem for the station for years, Millionaire was one of two major additions to WCBS' lineup for the 2002–2003 season. The station gave it the 4:00 p.m. weekday timeslot that had housed Weakest Link, a syndicated version of another network primetime quiz show (in this case, produced by NBC) that had launched in January 2002 and had been moved to late night to make room for Millionaire.

The timeslot, at the time, was a fairly competitive one. WABC-TV had been airing The Oprah Winfrey Show, which had consistently been the most popular daytime talk show, there since December 1986. WNBC at the time carried Judge Judy, which was the second-highest rated program in daytime syndication behind Oprah. Millionaire was unable to cut into the audience for either program, despite having the other major WCBS acquisition, the talk show Dr. Phil, as its lead in. WCBS again decided to switch its lineup.

In April 2003, with the season in its final weeks, WCBS announced its addition of The People's Court to its lineup for fall 2003 after the revived series had aired since its 1997 debut on WNBC. WCBS announced that The People's Court would be airing at 4:00 p.m. once it joined the station's lineup, which meant that Millionaire would be forced out of the timeslot after one year. BVT tried to negotiate with WCBS for another timeslot, but the station had other obligations and thus could not accommodate them. This left BVT in a tough spot as far as New York was concerned, as all of the other stations had somewhat full daytime and Prime Access schedules as well. However, shortly after the first season came to an end, circumstances at the show's former network home allowed for a new option to become available.

ABC announced in July 2003 that it would be ceasing programming the 12:30 p.m. timeslot and cancelling the serial that had occupied that slot since 1997, the General Hospital spin-off Port Charles. Since network flagship WABC now had a free space in its daytime schedule, they agreed to take on Millionaire for its second season. Although ABC's contract to air Port Charles ran until October 3, 2003, WABC was able to begin airing Millionaire at 12:30 immediately and moved the serial to late night. ABC was impressed enough with the ratings improvement that the network, with one or two exceptions (WLS-TV in Chicago and KABC-TV in Los Angeles, though the latter would eventually add the series) picked up Millionaire for the other stations it owned.

Following the 2014–15 season, Millionaire was nearly canceled after a disagreement with BVT's successor, Disney-ABC Domestic Television, and Sony Pictures Entertainment, the owner of the format rights through its subsidiary 2waytraffic. According to e-mails released in the Sony Pictures Entertainment hack, Millionaire's declining ratings prompted DADT to demand a dramatically reduced licensing fee for renewal, which SPE was hesitant to accept. The two sides eventually agreed on terms for renewal, which included a return to the original question format (but with fourteen questions) and cuts to the production budget, which resulted in the series leaving New York for Stamford, Connecticut (although this had been done in 2014) and later moving to Las Vegas. Had the show not been renewed, SPE was going to place the show on extended hiatus for three years, after which it would reclaim full rights to the show and be free to shop the revived show to another network or syndicator. DADT, meanwhile, would keep the rights to the format changes made in the late 2000s and early 2010s.

Despite its renewal, many of the stations airing Millionaire, especially the ABC-owned stations, added the talk show FABLife for 2015. When FABlife failed to gain an audience and was canceled at midseason, Millionaire was able to return to many of its former airing times for 2016; beginning that year, Millionaire and the viral video show RightThisMinute began being sold as a package to ABC stations.

On January 17, 2017, it was announced that Millionaire has been renewed through 2018. Millionaire was subsequently renewed through the 2018–19 season on January 17, 2018.

As the seventeenth season progressed, the future of Millionaire became uncertain. Its strongest group of stations, the ABC-owned stations, had announced that they would be picking up a new talk show hosted by former NBC News anchor and correspondent Tamron Hall for Fall 2019, making no announcement about the future of Millionaire with it; thus, it was speculated that the series would likely be facing its end. On May 17, 2019, the cancellation announcement came down, with Millionaire airing its final first-run episode on May 31, 2019.

Just over a year later, another shakeup involving Disney properties gave the series life again. As part of their acquisition of 21st Century Fox's broadcasting assets in 2019, Disney became the syndicator for series that were previously distributed by Fox through its subsidiary 20th Television. This included syndicated reruns of the first twenty-five seasons of the TV series Cops. In the aftermath of the murder of George Floyd by a Minneapolis police officer, first-run episodes were canceled by the series' current producer, Paramount Network, as were all reruns. Disney responded by immediately removing all of the episodes of Cops under its control from local stations. Many of the stations airing the rerun package were offered reruns from the final season of the syndicated version of Millionaire as a replacement and many took them up on the offer.

=== Reruns on GSN ===
Game Show Network (GSN) acquired the rerun rights to the US Millionaire in August 2003. The network initially aired only episodes from the three seasons of the original prime-time run; however, additional episodes were later added. These included the Super Millionaire spin-off, which aired on GSN from May 2005 to January 2007, and the first two seasons of the syndicated version, which began airing on November 10, 2008. On December 4, 2017, GSN acquired the rerun rights to the Harrison episodes of Millionaire (seasons fourteen and fifteen), which began airing on December 18, 2017. On April 3, 2023, GSN started re-airing the Regis era episodes.

== Special editions ==
Various special editions and tournaments have been conducted, which feature celebrities playing the game and donating winnings to charities of their choice. During celebrity editions on the original ABC version, contestants were allowed to receive help from their fellow contestants during the first ten questions. Any celebrity contestant who gives the wrong answer in any of the first ten questions will leave with the amount of the previous question correctly and then doubled (up to $32,000) regardless. The first celebrity contestant to win the top prize is David Chang, who won $1,000,000 for his charity, Southern Smoke Foundation. The second overall celebrity contestants and the first duo to win the top prize were Ike and Alan Barinholtz, winning $1,000,000 for their charity, the ASL Program at Los Encinos School. The third overall celebrity contestants and the second duo to win the top prize were Ken Jennings and Matt Damon, winning $1,000,000 for their charity, Water.org. The fourth overall celebrity contestants and the third duo to win the top prize were Oscar Nuñez and Kate Flannery, winning $1,000,000 for their charities, Planned Parenthood and Philabundance. The fifth overall celebrity contestants and the fourth duo to win the top prize were Jamie Ding and Ben Affleck, winning $1,000,000 for their charity, Eastern Congo Initiative. There have also been celebrity contestants who have won $500,000 throughout the show's run, with individual contestants including Drew Carey, Rosie O'Donnell, Norm Macdonald, Charles Esten, Lauren Lapkus, Anderson Cooper, and Julie Bowen; there have also been two separate teams of two contestants that have won $500,000 on the show, Paul Giamatti and Jesse Eisenberg, as well as Paul Scheer and Rob Huebel. The episode featuring O'Donnell's $500,000 win averaged 36.1 million viewers, the highest number for a single episode of the show. Kermit the Frog also appeared as a guest audience member on November 14, 2000, which also aired a pop-up version, in the style of VH1's Pop-Up Video, on December 26 of that same year.

There have also been special weeks featuring two or three family members or couples competing as a team, a "Champions Edition" where former big winners (ranging from $250,000 to $1,000,000, with three winning the latter amount) returned and split their winnings with their favorite charities, a "Zero Dollar Winner Edition" featuring contestants who previously missed one of the first-tier questions and left with nothing, and a "Tax-Free Edition" in which H&R Block calculated the taxes of winnings to allow contestants to earn stated winnings after taxes, and various theme weeks featuring college students, teachers, brides-to-be, etc. as contestants. Additionally, the syndicated version once featured an annual "Walk In & Win Week" with contestants who were randomly selected from the audience without having to take the audition test.

Special weeks have also included shows featuring questions concerning specific topics, such as professional football, celebrity gossip, movies, and pop culture. During a week of episodes in November 2007, to celebrate the 1,000th episode of the syndicated Millionaire, all contestants that week started with $1,000 so that they could not leave empty-handed, and only had to answer ten questions to win $1,000,000. During that week, twenty home viewers per day also won $1,000 each. In 2010, to celebrate the 1,500th episode, the $1,000 floor was temporarily increased to $1,500.

=== Who Wants to Be a Super Millionaire? ===
In 2004, Philbin returned to host 12 episodes of a spin-off program titled Who Wants to Be a Super Millionaire? in which contestants could potentially win $10,000,000. ABC aired five episodes of this spin-off during the week of February 22, 2004, and an additional seven episodes later that year in May. As usual, contestants had to answer a series of 15 multiple-choice questions of increasing difficulty, but the dollar values rose substantially. The questions for Super Millionaire were worth $1,000, $2,000, $3,000, $4,000, $5,000 (the first safe haven), $10,000, $20,000, $30,000, $50,000, $100,000 (the second safe haven), $500,000, $1,000,000, $2,500,000, $5,000,000, and $10,000,000.

Contestants were given the standard three lifelines in place at the time (50:50, Ask the Audience, and Phone-a-Friend) at the beginning of the game. However, after correctly answering the $100,000 question, the contestant earned two additional lifelines: Three Wise Men and Double Dip (see Lifelines), as the game would go to the "next dimension".

=== 10th Anniversary Celebration ===
To celebrate the tenth anniversary of Millionaire's US debut, the show returned to ABC primetime for an eleven-night event hosted by Philbin, which aired from August 9 to 23, 2009. The Academy Award-winning movie Slumdog Millionaire and the 2008 economic crisis helped boost interest of renewal of the game show. The format for these episodes combined the original network series format with the ruleset that was currently in place on the syndicated series; this saw the return of the Fastest Finger round, which the syndicated series had never employed, as well as the addition of the clock, which the network series had not previously used.

Various celebrities also made special guest appearances at the end of every episode; each guest played one question for a chance at $50,000 for a charity of their choice, without a time limit, and was allowed to choose one of the four lifelines in place at the time (Phone-a-Friend, Ask the Audience, Double Dip, and Ask the Expert), but still earned a minimum of $25,000 for the charity if they answered the question incorrectly.

On August 18, 2009, New York City resident Nik Bonaddio appeared on the program, winning $100,000 with the help of the audience and later, his expert, Gwen Ifill as his lifelines. Bonaddio then used the proceeds to start the sports analytics firm numberFire, which was sold in September 2015 to FanDuel, a fantasy sports platform.

Ken Basin's million dollar question
Total Winnings: $25,000

$1,000,000 (15 of 15) – 4:39 time limit

For ordering his favorite beverages on demand, LBJ had four buttons installed in the Oval Office labeled "coffee", "tea", "Coke" and what?

1. Fresca(correct answer)
2. V8
3. Yoo-hoo(chosen; incorrect answer)
4. A&W

The finale of the tenth anniversary special, which aired on August 23, 2009, featured Ken Basin, an entertainment lawyer from Los Angeles, California, who went on to become the first contestant to play a $1,000,000 question in the "clock format". With a time of 4:39 (45 seconds + 3:54 banked time), Basin was given a question involving President Lyndon Baines Johnson's fondness for Fresca. Using his one remaining lifeline, Basin asked the audience, which supported his own hunch of Yoo-hoo rather than the correct answer. He decided to stick with the audience's response, answer the question and lost $475,000 of his $500,000 that he got and leaving with $25,000, becoming the first contestant in the US version to answer a $1,000,000 question incorrectly, meaning that he leaves with $25,000. Basin's appearance on the show also marked the last time the Fastest Finger round was used on the US version of Millionaire (as of 2026).

After Basin finished his run, Vieira, the secret guest celebrity, appeared on-camera and announced that the nine remaining Fastest Finger contestants would play with her on the first week of the syndicated version's eighth season, giving them a chance to qualify for one of the ten spots in the "Million Dollar Tournament of Ten" (see below). In a surprise twist, she then revealed that Philbin would be the one answering that episode's celebrity question, marking Philbin's only appearance on the show as a contestant. Philbin received a question about previous million dollar answers, and won $50,000 for his charity, Cardinal Hayes High School, after answering correctly.

=== Million Dollar Tournament of Ten ===
Entering its eighth season in the fall of 2009, the syndicated Millionaire had not produced a million dollar winner since the second half of its first season when both Kevin Smith and Nancy Christy won the top prize. The producers of the show decided that they would come up with a method to guarantee that there would be another top prize winner before the season was out.

The season premiere on September 7, 2009, launched the Millionaire Tournament of Ten. The first nine weeks of the season were used as the qualifying round, and the top ten highest money winners from those forty-five episodes would make up the field for the tournament, which would begin on November 9 and run until November 20. Ties were broken first by how much time that the contestants had not used in answering their questions.

The rules:

- The ten qualifiers played, one at a time, in order from lowest winning total to highest. The question was played at the conclusion of the day's episode, and each qualifier was asked the million dollar question that would have been asked during their game had they managed to reach it.
- As per the million-dollar question rules, the qualifiers were given a base time of 45 seconds to answer and any unused time from their previous game was added to that.
- No lifelines were available.
- The qualifiers were not required to attempt their million-dollar questions. The same rules for an incorrect answer applied, which would result in their total winnings being reduced to $25,000.

The first qualifier to correctly answer a million-dollar question would become the tournament leader and would keep the lead as long as none of the qualifiers seeded ahead of him/her answered their question correctly. The last contestant to answer their question correctly at the conclusion of the two-week tournament would be declared the winner and take the million dollar prize.

On the third day of the tournament (November 11), the eighth-seeded contestant, Sam Murray, took his turn and faced this question with a time limit of 3:23 (45 seconds + 2:38 banked time).

Sam Murray's million dollar question

$1,000,000 – 3:23 time limit

According to the Population Reference Bureau, what is the approximate number of people who have ever lived on Earth?

1. 50 billion
2. 100 billion(correct answer)
3. 1 trillion
4. 5 trillion

Murray, who was the final contestant to earn a spot in the tournament by virtue of his $50,000 win the week before it began on November 6, was the first qualifier to attempt the million-dollar question. His correct answer gave Murray the tournament lead, and he continued to hold it as the next six qualifiers each passed on attempting their million-dollar questions.

On November 20, the top seeded contestant, Jehan Shamsid-Deen, took her turn. Having won $250,000 in her appearance on October 9 and 10, she went into the final question with a clock of 4:36 (45 seconds + 3:51 banked time). She was asked what type of geographical feature the Blorenge was, with one of the answer choices being a mountain in Wales. Shamsid-Deen believed that particular answer was correct. Although it would later be revealed that she would have been right, Shamsid-Deen did not feel confident enough to put $225,000 at stake; by virtue of this, Murray won the tournament. He was the third person to win the top prize on the syndicated series, as well as being the last millionaire prior to its 2019 cancellation; the million-dollar prize would not be awarded again until David Chang won $1 million on November 29, 2020.

=== 2020 reboot ===
A 2020 reboot of the show featuring celebrity guests playing for charity is executive produced by Kimmel, who is also the host, Davies and Mike Richards, with the latter leaving the position after the first season. Nine episodes were filmed without an audience within two days from March 13 to 15, 2020, just before California issued a stay-at-home order due to the COVID-19 pandemic. Partly due to this change, the "Ask the Audience" lifeline was removed. A new lifeline, "Ask the Host", was introduced as its replacement instead. The celebrities featured in the first season were Eric Stonestreet, Will Forte, Nikki Glaser, Jane Fonda, Anthony Anderson, Ike Barinholtz (who later won the top prize with his dad, Alan, on August 14, 2024), Hannibal Buress, Catherine O'Hara, Dr. Phil, Kaitlin Olson, Lauren Lapkus, Anderson Cooper, and Andy Cohen, the latter two of which played as both contestants and supporters.

On May 21, 2020, Deadline reported that the revival was given an order for a second season, to air during the 2020–21 television season. On June 17, 2020, it was announced that the second season of Who Wants to Be a Millionaire was scheduled to air on Sunday nights at 9:00 p.m. ET starting Fall 2020. ABC announced in August 2020 that the second season would premiere on October 18. In addition to celebrity contestants playing for charity as they did in the first season, the second season had "frontline heroes" also playing for the $1,000,000 prize.

The celebrities that appeared in the second season of the reboot were Tiffany Haddish, Julie Bowen, Ray Romano, Rebel Wilson, Joel McHale, and David Chang, the latter of which became the first celebrity on the show to win the top prize for his charity, Southern Smoke Foundation, which occurred on November 29, 2020.

A report published on January 20, 2022, stated that ABC had put the revival on an indefinite hiatus; however, the network has left the door open for future episodes. Despite this, on January 26, 2023, Davies posted on Instagram congratulating Kimmel for the 20th anniversary of his late-night talk show Jimmy Kimmel Live! and also added that they are both still working together on Millionaire, hinting that the show will likely return with Kimmel at some point in the future. On May 3, 2024, it was announced that the series would be revived once again for its 25th anniversary, with Kimmel returning as host, and featuring celebrity contestant duos and the return of the studio audience. The new season premiered on July 10, 2024.

On April 22, 2025, it was announced that the revival was renewed for a fourth season, and would once again consist of a pair of two celebrity contestants playing for $1 million. The fourth season premiered on July 23, 2025.

On May 8, 2026, it was announced that the revival was renewed for a fifth season, and would yet once again consist of a pair of two celebrity contestants playing for $1 million. The fifth season premiered on July 22, 2026.

As of July 29, 2026, Jamie Ding and Ben Affleck are the most recent million-dollar winners on the US version of Millionaire.

== Reception ==
Since its introduction to the United States, GSN credited Who Wants to Be a Millionaire with not only single-handedly reviving the game show genre, but also breaking new ground for it. The series revolutionized the look and feel of game shows with its unique lighting system, dramatic music cues, and futuristic set. The show also became one of the highest-rated and most popular game shows in American television history and has been credited with paving the way for the rise of the primetime reality TV phenomenon to prominence throughout the 2000s.

The American Millionaire also made catchphrases out of various lines used on the show. In particular, "Is that your final answer?", asked by Millionaire's hosts whenever a contestant's answer needs to be verified, was popularized by Philbin during his tenure as host, and was also included on TV Land's special "100 Greatest TV Quotes and Catch Phrases", which aired in 2006. Meanwhile, during his tenure as host, Cedric signed off shows with a catchphrase of his own, "Watch yo' wallet!"

The original primetime version of the American Millionaire won two Daytime Emmy Awards for Outstanding Game/Audience Participation Show in 2000 and 2001. Philbin was honored with a Daytime Emmy in the category of Outstanding Game Show Host in 2001, while Vieira received one in 2005, and another in 2009. TV Guide ranked the American Millionaire #7 on its 2001 list of the 50 Greatest Game Shows of All Time, and later ranked it #6 on its 2013 "60 Greatest Game Shows" list. GSN ranked Millionaire #5 on its August 2006 list of the 50 Greatest Game Shows of All Time, and later honored the show in January 2007 on its only Gameshow Hall of Fame special.

== Other media ==
=== Merchandise ===
In 2000, Pressman released two board game adaptions of Millionaire as well as a junior edition recommended for younger players. Several video games based on the varying gameplay formats of Millionaire have also been released throughout the course of the show's American history.

Between 1999 and 2001, Jellyvision (the predecessor to Jackbox Games) produced five video game adaptations based upon the original primetime series for personal computers and Sony's PlayStation console, all of them featuring Philbin's likeness and voice. The first of these adaptations was published by Disney Interactive, while the later four were published by Buena Vista Interactive which had just been spun off from DI when it reestablished itself in attempts to diversify its portfolio. Of the five games, three featured general trivia questions, one was sports-themed, and another was a "Kids Edition" featuring easier questions. In 2007, Imagination Games released a DVD version of the show, based on the 2004–08 format and coming complete with Vieira's likeness and voice, as well as a quiz book and a 2009 desktop calendar. Additionally, two Millionaire video games were released by Ludia in conjunction with Ubisoft in 2010 and 2011; the first of these was a game for Nintendo's Wii console and DS handheld system, as well as Sony's PlayStation 3, based on the clock format, while the second, for Microsoft's Xbox 360, via Kinect, was based on the shuffle format.

Ludia made a Facebook game based on Millionaire available from 2011 to 2016. This game featured an altered version of the shuffle format, condensing the number of questions to twelve—eight in round one and four in round two. Contestants competed against eight other Millionaire fans in round one, with the top three playing round two alone. There was no "final answer" rule; the contestant's responses were automatically locked in. Answering a question correctly earned a contestant the value of that question, multiplied by the number of people who responded incorrectly. Contestants were allowed to use two of their Facebook friends as Jump the Question lifelines in round one, and to use the Ask the Audience lifeline in round two to invite up to 50 such friends of theirs to answer a question for a portion of the prize money of the current question.

In September 2018, Sony Pictures Television, in collaboration with Uken Inc., released a mobile edition of Millionaire for iOS and Android. The rules are similar to the 2015-2019 format of Millionaire, though this version features fifteen questions and a 30-second time limit for each question. Additionally, the money tree is based on the 2009-2010 tree on the syndicated version of the show. Players can unlock new cities and win prizes as they progress through the game.

In December 2023, Sony Pictures Television released a mobile version of Millionaire for iOS and Android based on the original 1999-2008 format of the show. This version also includes the addition of Switch the Question as a fourth lifeline which can be used from the start of the game. Players are also able to play a "Champions" edition of Millionaire, which features questions that have been used on-air since the show began.

=== Album ===
Who Wants to Be a Millionaire: The Album (Celador Records), by Keith & Matthew Strachan, with additional tracks by Amoure, was released August 1, 2000, and features songs based on the show.

=== Disney Parks attraction ===
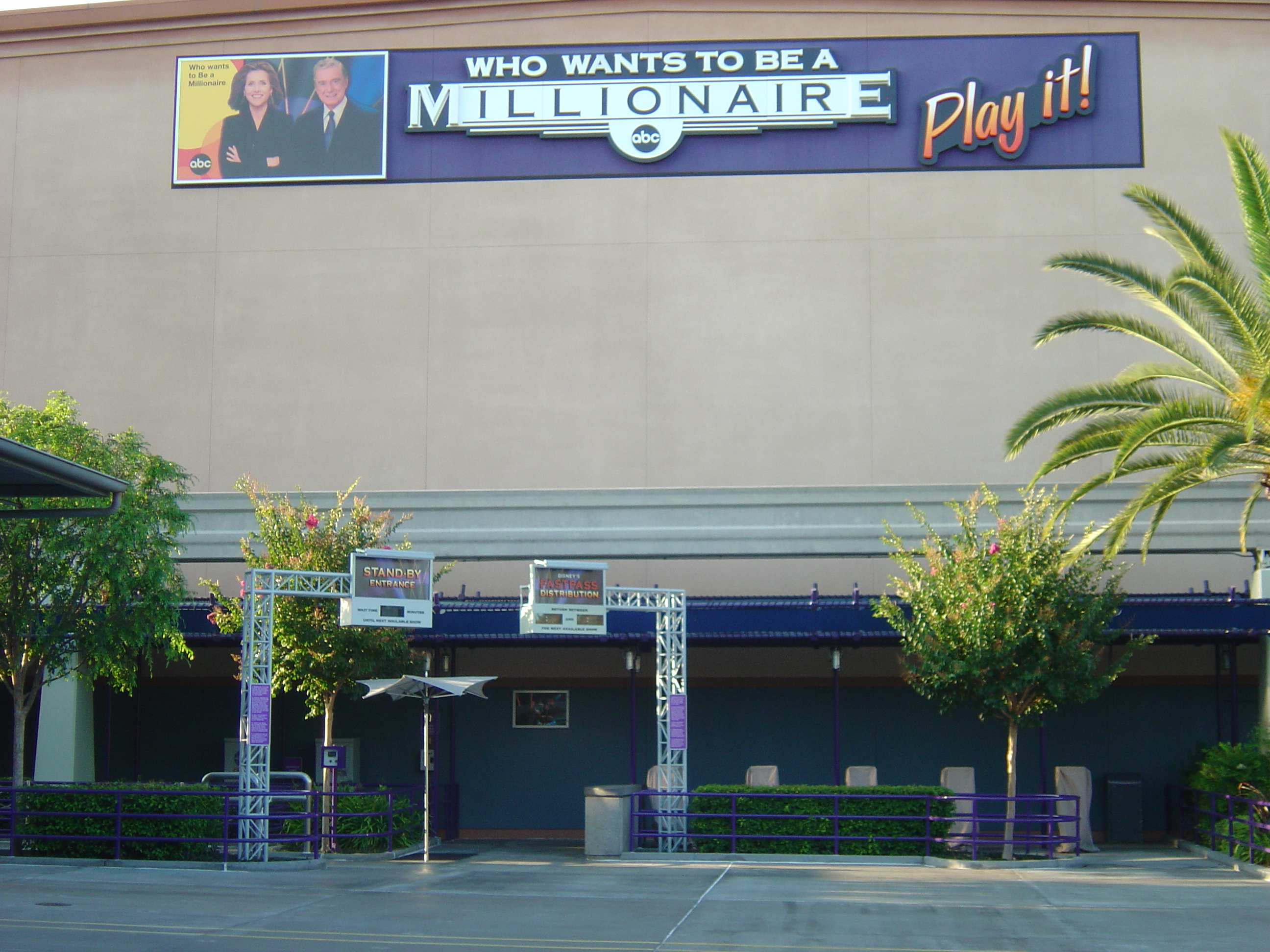
The building that housed the Californian version, shown here after its 2004 closure

Who Wants to Be a Millionaire – Play It! was an attraction at the Disney's Hollywood Studios theme park (when it was known as Disney-MGM Studios) at Walt Disney World in Orlando, Florida and at the Disney California Adventure park in Anaheim, California. Both the Florida and California Play It! attractions opened in 2001; the California version closed in 2004, and the Florida version closed in 2006 and was replaced by Toy Story Midway Mania!

The format in the Play It! attraction was very similar to that of the television show that inspired it. When a show started, a Fastest Finger question was given, and the audience was asked to put the four answers in order; the person with the fastest time was the first contestant in the Hot Seat for that show. However, the main game had some differences: for example, contestants competed for points rather than dollars, the questions were set to time limits, and the Phone-a-Friend lifeline became Phone a Complete Stranger which connected the contestant to a Disney cast member outside the attraction's theater who would find a guest to help. After every level the player completed, he or she was awarded a collectible lapel pin. Additional prizes were awarded after every fifth question they answered correctly.

== Notes ==
Preceded by Win Ben Stein's Money	Daytime Emmy Award for Outstanding Game/Audience Participation Show; 2000–2001	Succeeded by Jeopardy!
