= Chris Witaske =

American actor (born 1983)

- Born: St. Charles, Illinois, U.S.
- Occupation: Actor
- Years active: 2014–present

Chris Witaske is an American actor, best known for his portrayal of Chris Czajkowski in the Netflix romantic comedy Love, and Pete Katinsky in the Emmy Awards-winning FX on Hulu comedy series The Bear.

== Life and career ==
Witaske was born in St. Charles, Illinois. He began taking classes at Second City in Chicago as a teenager and also performed as a birthday party magician before focusing mainly on comedy and acting. Witaske attended St. Charles High School and after graduation, he commenced his studies at the University of Iowa where he majored in Theater Arts. He then moved to Chicago and worked at comedy venues including the Second City, iO, and Annoyance Theaters before moving to Los Angeles. In 2013, he and his Second City castmates made an appearance on stage at a Phish concert at FirstMerit Bank Pavilion.

In 2014, Witaske made his television acting debut in the Fox comedy-drama series New Girl. Following on from his first role, Witaske won other roles on a variety of TV shows and films including The Comeback, Teachers, Drunk History, Lady Bird, Unicorn Store, What Men Want, Arrested Development, Weird City, The Wrong Missy, and The Bear. He plays Pete, a wholesome Midwestern lawyer and Natalie's husband, on The Bear.

In 2016, Witaske was cast as Chris Czajkowski in the Netflix romantic comedy Love and was promoted to a series regular role the following year.

In July 2021, it was announced that Netflix had greenlit the adult animated series Chicago Party Aunt, created by Witaske with Jon Barinholtz and Katie Rich and based on the Twitter account Witaske created of the same name. The series started airing on September 21, 2021.

== Filmography ==
=== Film ===
Year	Title	Role	Notes
2017	Lady Bird	James	
2017	Unicorn Store	Matt	
2019	What Men Want	Eddie	
2020	The Wrong Missy	Rich	
2022	The Bubble	Josh	
2024	Omni Loop	Morris	
2025	Holland	Holland cop	

=== Television ===
Year	Title	Role	Notes
2014	New Girl	Bradley	Episode: "Dice"
2014	The Comeback	Kevin	Episode: "Valerie Gets What She Really Wants"
2015	W/ Bob & David	Salesman	Episode: "1.04"
2016–2018	Love	Chris Czajkowski	17 episodes Recurring (season 1–2); Main (season 3)
2017	Drunk History	Alexander Hamilton	Episode: "Drunk History Christmas Special"
2017	Teachers	Mr. Schmidt	Episode: "Passive Eggressive"
2018	Arrested Development	Instructor	Episode: "Sinking Feelings"
2018	Alone Together	Jason	Episode: "Crypto"
2019	Fresh Off the Boat	Ken	Episode: "Just the Two of Us"
2019	Weird City	Booj	Episode: "The One"
2019	Sunnyside	Tanner	Episode: "Skirt-Skirt!"
2021	Curb Your Enthusiasm	Deke	Episode: "Igor, Gregor, & Timor"
2021–2022	Chicago Party Aunt	Kurt (voice)	Also series co-creator
2022–2026	The Bear	Pete Katinsky	15 episodes
2022–2024	Is It Cake?	Himself / Judge	4 episodes
2026	Free Bert	Landon Vanderthal	6 episodes
