= One Attempt Remaining =

Upcoming American film by Kay Cannon

- Directed by: Kay Cannon
- Written by: Kay Cannon; Joe Boothe; Alexa Alemanni
- Produced by: Jennifer Garner; Shawn Levy; Dan Levine; Nicole King
- Starring: Jennifer Garner; John Cena; Kate McKinnon; Aimee Carrero; Yara Shahidi
- Cinematography: Barry Peterson
- Production companies: 21 Laps Entertainment; Linden Productions
- Distributed by: Netflix
- Country: United States
- Language: English

One Attempt Remaining is an upcoming American comedy film directed by Kay Cannon, who co-wrote the script with Joe Boothe and Alexa Alemanni. It stars Jennifer Garner, John Cena, Kate McKinnon, Aimee Carrero, and Yara Shahidi.

== Premise ==
A divorced couple are forced to team up in order to track down a lost crypto password, one that logs into an account worth millions.

== Cast ==
- Jennifer Garner
- John Cena
- Kate McKinnon
- Aimee Carrero
- Yara Shahidi
- Nyambi Nyambi
- Larry Wilmore
- Gilles Marini
- Abdul Seidu
- Alan Barinholtz
- Carol Mansell

== Production ==
In December 2025, it was reported that a new comedy film directed by Kay Cannon, who co-wrote the script with Joe Boothe and Alexa Alemanni was in development, with Jennifer Garner starring. In February, John Cena, Kate McKinnon, and Aimee Carrero joined the cast. Principal photography began on March 4, 2026, in Los Angeles and Long Beach, California, with Yara Shahidi, Nyambi Nyambi, Larry Wilmore, Gilles Marini, Abdul Seidu, Alan Barinholtz, and Carol Mansell rounding out the cast.
