= TTFN =

Initialism meaning "goodbye"

TTFN is an initialism for "ta ta for now", an informal "goodbye". The expression came to prominence in the UK during the Second World War. Used by the military, it was frequently heard by the British public.

"TTFN" was introduced in 1940 in the British weekly radio comedy It's That Man Again by the character Mrs Mopp, who ended every scene with it. During the second series, the show's name was shortened to ITMA, to satirize the abundance of abbreviations that were becoming common knowledge due to the ongoing war.

== Other usage ==
In the 1966 Batman television episode "Better Luck Next Time", Catwoman (played by the actress Julie Newmar) states "TTFN" in a microphone to Batman (Adam West) while he is high upon a wall while being stalked by her tiger, Tinkerbell, and then she has to further explain the meaning of the initialism to the puzzled Batman.

In Winnie the Pooh and the Blustery Day, a 1968 Disney featurette, the voice of Tigger was performed by Paul Winchell, whose wife Jean Freeman suggested that he ad-lib the line. It was further used by Tigger in The New Adventures of Winnie the Pooh (1988–1991), often followed by a "hoo hoo hoo hoo!" as he bounces away on his tail. Tigger also uses variations of the word, in the episode Tigger is the Mother of Invention he says "TTFG. Ta-ta for good", and in The Tigger Movie "TTFE. Ta-ta For Ever". However, the phrase does not appear in the original books by A. A. Milne.

It appears in the 1980 children's book 'Quest for the Gloop' by Helen Nicoll and Jan Pienkowski

Tim Horton, the deceased professional hockey player and founder of the Tim Horton's Doughnut chain, has "TTFN" on his grave stone.

On the sitcom Bewitched, the character Endora used the phrase TTFN before vanishing into thin air.

"Ta ta for now" caught on with the British public so much that it was often uttered by dying people as their last words. It has been the catchphrase of radio personalities such as Jimmy Young, who modified it to BFN: "Bye for now".

In the 1990s, TTFN was still being used in online chat such as IRC and MUDs.

The young adult novel ttfn by Lauren Myracle was released in 2005. The frequently challenged novel is written entirely in the style of instant messaging.

The acronym "TTFN" appears four times in the 2013 play Peter and the Starcatcher by Rick Elice. Although the play takes place in 1885, several decades before the phrase caught on, it maintains a deliberately anachronistic style that justifies the phrase's inclusion.
