= American Auto =

American television sitcom series

- Genre: Sitcom; Workplace comedy
- Created by: Justin Spitzer
- Starring: Ana Gasteyer; Harriet Dyer; Jon Barinholtz; Tye White; Michael Benjamin Washington; Humphrey Ker; X Mayo
- Music by: Jeff Cardoni; Hal Rosenfeld
- Country of origin: United States
- Original language: English
- No. of seasons: 2
- No. of episodes: 23

Production
- Executive producers: Justin Spitzer; Aaron Kaplan; Dana Honor; Jeffrey Blitz; Eric Ledgin; Brian Morewitz
- Producers: Josh Greene; Elena Crevello; Kyle Mack; Ana Gasteyer; Scott Printz; Meg Schave
- Cinematography: Benjamin Kasulke; Jay Hunter; Justin Duval
- Editors: Matthew Barbato; James Renfroe; Jeff Hall; Chris Lorusso; Eric Kissack; Christian Kinnard; Jason Brotman
- Camera setup: Single-camera
- Running time: 22 minutes
- Production companies: Spitzer Holding Company; Kapital Entertainment; Universal Television

Original release
- Network: NBC
- Release: December 13, 2021 – April 18, 2023

American Auto is an American television sitcom created by Justin Spitzer that aired from December 13, 2021 to April 18, 2023 on NBC. In May 2022, the series was renewed for a second season which premiered on January 24, 2023. In June 2023, American Auto was canceled after two seasons.

== Premise ==
The series follows the employees of Detroit-based Payne Motors, and explores the company's struggles after a new CEO who knows little about cars is hired from the pharmaceutical industry.

== Cast and characters ==
=== Main ===
- Ana Gasteyer as Katherine Hastings, Payne Motors' new CEO. Classic corporate shark who jumps from one company to another. Before that she was in a pharmacology company and often tries to make a parallel between that and car industry, but she knows nothing about cars.
- Harriet Dyer as Sadie Ryan, Payne Motors' CCO
- Jon Barinholtz as Wesley Payne, grandson of Payne Motors' retired CEO and brat-type who doesn't really have a job but shows at headquarters every day
- Tye White as Jack Fordham, a former assembly-line employee brought in to help in the C-suite who is like a counselor to Hastings
- Michael Benjamin Washington as Cyrus Knight, Payne's chief product designer
- Humphrey Ker as Elliot Chisholm, Payne's general counsel
- X Mayo as Dorothy "Dori" Otis, Hastings' assistant and social media addict

=== Recurring ===
- Brad Hall as Richard, Katherine's husband and a math teacher in a primary school. He is very supportive of her job until the charity dinner.
- Elizabeth Hinkler as Chloe
- Matthew Moy as Dale (season 2)

=== Guest ===
- Jeff Meacham as Brent (season 1)
- Christopher Chen as Jin Tao-Kang, Payne Motors' CFO who dislikes Hastings and wants to leave Payne for Volkswagen (seasons 1-2)
- Jerry Minor as Steve (season 1)
- Tom McGowan as Ed (season 1)
- Joshua Malina as Ted (seasons 1-2)
- Jim O'Heir as Governor Tom Harper (season 1)
- Andy Daly as Frank (season 1)
- Matt Murray as Bennett (season 1)
- Lombardo Boyar as Robin (season 1)
- Betsy Sodaro as Alex (season 1)
- Martha Kelly as Barb, a desk worker who starts to stalk Hastings (season 1)
- Ike Barinholtz as Landon Payne, who is in politics (seasons 1-2)
- Ian Roberts as Charlie Altman (season 1)
- Jim Meskimen as Soren McGarry (seasons 1-2)
- Tom Bergeron as himself, roasting celebrities at the Payne charity dinner (season 1)
- Marc Evan Jackson as Alan Strong (season 1)
- Eric Stonestreet as Ian (season 2)
- Seth Meyers as himself (season 2)
- Jim Cramer as himself (season 2)
- Ryan Reynolds as himself (season 2)
- Andy Richter as himself (season 2)
- Ben Feldman as Chase (season 2)
- Gilles Marini as Jules Durand (season 2)
- Blaire Erskine as Christina (season 2)
- Kaliko Kauahi as Tammy (season 2)

== Episodes ==
=== Series overview ===
Season	Episodes	Originally released	
Season	Episodes	First released	Last released
1	10	December 13, 2021	March 8, 2022
2	13	January 24, 2023	April 18, 2023

=== Season 1 (2021–22) ===
No. overall	No. in season	Title	Directed by	Written by	Original release date	U.S. viewers (millions)
1	1	"Pilot"	Jeffrey Blitz	Justin Spitzer	December 13, 2021	2.95
Pharmaceutical CEO Katherine Hastings takes over as CEO of Payne Motors after the last Payne family member to run the company retires. While testing the new self-driving Payne Ponderosa, African-American plant worker Jack is struck when the car fails to brake, and engineer Cyrus deduces the vehicle cannot properly detect dark skin. Worried that the vehicle will be perceived as "racist", Hastings assembles a team to redesign the auto, with disastrous results.
2	2	"White Van"	Jeffrey Blitz	Justin Spitzer	December 13, 2021	1.87
As Jack settles into his new white-collar position, Wesley views him as an errand boy and tries to assign him menial tasks. Meanwhile, a serial killer is discovered to have driven away his latest victim in a Payne Magellan, leading to unwanted press coverage akin to the O. J. Simpson car chase. However, after a helicopter camera crew follows the vehicle as it drives down the highway, marketing director Sadie learns that any publicity is good publicity, as orders for Magellans start pouring in.
3	3	"Earnings Call"	Matt Sohn	Shirin Najafi	January 4, 2022	2.43
With little good news to share on the company's quarterly earnings call, Katherine is pressed by a caller to announce any new ideas she's introduced as the incoming CEO. Katherine learns from Cyrus that the company is close to introducing an entry-level vehicle, the Payne Pika, which they painstakingly were able to get down to a base price of $12,600. Thinking a round number is better, Katherine -- without anyone's input -- announces on the call that the Pika's base price will be $10,000. Meanwhile, Jack helps Elliot with the plant's union negotiations, where an old pal representing for the union takes advantage of Jack sharing a management secret.
4	4	"The $10k Car"	Kim Nguyen	Elena Crevello	January 11, 2022	2.50
The team tries to cut every corner possible to get the Payne Pika down to Katherine's desired price of $10,000, but when she takes a ride in the final product, Katherine must make a difficult decision. Meanwhile, Elliot wants to unload his troublesome dog, but the only one in the office interested is Dori, who insists Elliot pay her to take the pooch. Dori then angers Elliot by immediately putting the dog up for sale online.
5	5	"Millbank, IA"	Lauren Ludwig	Kyle Mack	January 18, 2022	2.37
The Payne executives travel to Iowa for the ribbon-cutting at Payne's new factory, which promises to revive a struggling town. But hours before the ceremony, the team learns of a highly competitive bid to host the factory -- from a Balkan nation with a reputation for human rights abuses. The executives then attempt to derail the Millbank factory plans by attempting to stoke local xenophobia and environmental concerns to allow the Balkan bid to have a chance at success. As Katherine weighs her options, Jack wrestles with the morality of the decision, Cyrus speculates in real estate, and Wesley hunts for a date. Ultimately, a coup in the Balkan nation forces the Payne executives to reroute their private plane back to Millbank and open the factory as originally planned.
6	6	"Commercial"	Jeffrey Blitz	Albertina Rizzo	January 25, 2022	2.30
Payne faces criticism for the lack of LGBT representation in its ads. Katherine orders an ad for the Payne Magellan scheduled to air in a week to be reshot with same-sex couples as a result of the backlash. Frank, a politically conservative communications employee, pushes back. Wesley shadows the director of the ad, while Sadie and Katherine directly supervise its production and attempt to ensure LGBTQ and minority representation in the ads. The team ends up constantly swapping actors in and out. Ultimately, the child actors are sent home before shooting ends due to their contracts, so the final commercial has a very dark background and few children, giving it a very creepy tone. Katherine decides to let the ad air anyway, noting that nobody cares about ads anymore.
7	7	"Recall"	Randall Winston	Eric Ledgin	February 1, 2022	2.08
8	8	"Employee Morale"	Heather Jack	Bill Chais & Shirin Najafi	February 22, 2022	2.03
9	9	"Charity Dinner"	Phil Traill	Maxwell Theodore Vivian	March 1, 2022	2.06
10	10	"Profile"	Jeffrey Blitz	Justin Spitzer & Eric Ledgin	March 8, 2022	1.98

=== Season 2 (2023) ===
No. overall	No. in season	Title	Directed by	Written by	Original release date	U.S. viewers (millions)
11	1	"Crisis"	Matt Sohn	Justin Spitzer & Eric Ledgin	January 24, 2023	2.48
12	2	"Most Hated CEO"	Ross Novie	David Budin & Lauren Walker	January 31, 2023	2.36
13	3	"Celebrity"	Heather Jack	Bridget Kyle & Vicky Luu	February 7, 2023	2.09
14	4	"Cost Cutting"	Shahrzad Davani	Kyle Mack	February 14, 2023	1.86
15	5	"Going Green"	Jay Hunter	Shirin Najafi	February 21, 2023	1.80
16	6	"The Letter"	Lara Everly	Elena Crevello	February 28, 2023	1.82
17	7	"Young Designers"	Phil Traill	Jeff Maurer	March 7, 2023	2.22
18	8	"Hack"	Heather Jack	Kyle Mack & Vance Stringer	March 14, 2023	2.00
19	9	"Night Out"	Craig Zisk	Jeremy Hsu	March 21, 2023	1.90
20	10	"Passion Project"	Phill Lewis	Tim McAuliffe	March 28, 2023	1.91
21	11	"Funeral"	Pete Chatmon	Jonathan Green & Gabe Miller	April 4, 2023	1.97
22	12	"Dealer Event"	Jeffrey Blitz	Eric Ledgin & Gautham Nagesh	April 11, 2023	1.52
23	13	"Judgement Day"	Ross Novie	Shirin Najafi & Jordan Hearne	April 18, 2023	1.45

== Production ==
=== Development ===
American Auto has been in development since August 2013. TV writer Justin Spitzer, fresh off the success of The Office, wanted to produce a workplace comedy of his own, but would instead be set in the upper-management world. Spitzer sold his pitch to NBC, who put the idea as a put-pilot. The script did not go forward as a pilot, and Spitzer instead went to work on Superstore. After stepping down as showrunner in April 2019 and signing an overall deal with Universal Television, Spitzer went back and redeveloped the American Auto script.

On January 23, 2020, it was given a pilot order by NBC. The pilot was directed by Jeffrey Blitz and written by Spitzer who was expected to executive produce alongside Aaron Kaplan and Dana Honor. Production companies involved with the series include Spitzer Holding Company, Kapital Entertainment and Universal Television. On January 12, 2021, it was announced that NBC had ordered the series. On May 12, 2022, NBC renewed the series for a second season. On June 16, 2023, NBC canceled the series after two seasons.

=== Casting ===
In February 2020, Deadline reported Harriet Dyer had joined the cast as Sadie and later that Ana Gasteyer had also joined the cast as Katherine Hastings. In March, X Mayo joined the cast as Dori. In July, Tye White joined the cast as Jack, Michael B. Washington joined the cast as Cyrus, Humphrey Ker joined the cast as Elliot, and Jon Barinholtz joined the cast as Wesley.

== Broadcast ==
The series premiered on December 13, 2021, at 10 p.m., with two "sneak [peek] episodes" and returned on January 4, 2022, in its regular time slot at 8 p.m. on Tuesdays. The second season premiered on January 24, 2023, in its new time slot, 8:30 p.m. on Tuesdays. The series finale aired on April 18, 2023.

== Reception ==
=== Critical response ===
The review aggregator website Rotten Tomatoes reported a 100% approval rating with an average rating of 6.1/10, based on 11 critic reviews. The website's critics consensus reads, "While American Auto's hijinks don't bode well for the future of Payne Motors, they promise a hilarious sitcom with a solid foundation." Metacritic, which uses a weighted average, assigned a score of 68 out of 100 based on 11 critics, indicating "generally favorable reviews".

=== Ratings ===
==== Overall ====
Viewership and ratings per season of American Auto
Season	Timeslot (ET)	Episodes	First aired		Last aired		TV season
Season	Timeslot (ET)	Episodes	Date	Viewers (millions)	Date	Viewers (millions)	TV season
1	Monday 10:00 p.m. (1); Monday 10:30 p.m. (2); Tuesday 8:00 p.m. (3–10)	10	December 13, 2021	2.95	March 8, 2022	1.98	2021–22
2	Tuesday 8:30 p.m.	13	January 24, 2023	2.48	April 18, 2023	1.45	2022–23

==== Season 1 ====
Viewership and ratings per episode of American Auto
No.	Title	Air date	Rating (18–49)	Viewers (millions)	DVR (18–49)	DVR viewers (millions)	Total (18–49)	Total viewers (millions)
1	"Pilot"	December 13, 2021	0.4	2.95	0.1	0.45	0.4	3.40 (Note: Live+7 ratings were unavailable, so Live+3 ratings have been used instead.)
2	"White Van"	December 13, 2021	0.3	1.87	0.1	0.39	0.3	2.26
3	"Earnings Call"	January 4, 2022	0.4	2.43	0.0	0.39	0.4	2.82
4	"The $10k Car"	January 11, 2022	0.5	2.50	—N/a	—N/a	—N/a	—N/a
5	"Millbank, IA"	January 18, 2022	0.4	2.37	0.0	0.30	0.4	2.67
6	"Commercial"	January 25, 2022	0.4	2.30	0.1	0.28	0.5	2.58
7	"Recall"	February 1, 2022	0.4	2.08	—N/a	—N/a	—N/a	—N/a
8	"Employee Morale"	February 22, 2022	0.4	2.03	0.1	0.32	0.5	2.35
9	"Charity Dinner"	March 1, 2022	0.3	2.06	0.1	0.33	0.4	2.39
10	"Profile"	March 8, 2022	0.3	1.98	—N/a	—N/a	—N/a	—N/a

==== Season 2 ====
Viewership and ratings per episode of American Auto
No.	Title	Air date	Rating (18–49)	Viewers (millions)	DVR (18–49)	DVR viewers (millions)	Total (18–49)	Total viewers (millions)
1	"Crisis"	January 24, 2023	0.4	2.48	0.1	0.41	0.4	2.90
2	"Most Hated CEO"	January 31, 2023	0.3	2.36	—N/a	—N/a	—N/a	—N/a
3	"Celebrity"	February 7, 2023	0.3	2.09	—N/a	—N/a	—N/a	—N/a
4	"Cost Cutting"	February 14, 2023	0.3	1.86	—N/a	—N/a	—N/a	—N/a
5	"Going Green"	February 21, 2023	0.3	1.80	—N/a	—N/a	—N/a	—N/a
6	"The Letter"	February 28, 2023	0.3	1.82	—N/a	—N/a	—N/a	—N/a
7	"Young Designers"	March 7, 2023	0.4	2.22	—N/a	—N/a	—N/a	—N/a
8	"Hack"	March 14, 2023	0.3	2.00	—N/a	—N/a	—N/a	—N/a
9	"Night Out"	March 21, 2023	0.2	1.90	—N/a	—N/a	—N/a	—N/a
10	"Passion Project"	March 28, 2023	0.2	1.91	—N/a	—N/a	—N/a	—N/a
11	"Funeral"	April 4, 2023	0.2	1.97	—N/a	—N/a	—N/a	—N/a
12	"Dealer Event"	April 11, 2023	0.2	1.52	—N/a	—N/a	—N/a	—N/a
13	"Judgement Day"	April 18, 2023	0.2	1.45	—N/a	—N/a	—N/a	—N/a

=== Accolades ===
The series was nominated for Best Broadcast Network Series, Comedy, and Albertina Rizzo was nominated for Best Writing in a Broadcast Network or Cable Series, Comedy for the episode "Commercial" at the 2022 Hollywood Critics Association TV Awards.
