= Ike Barinholtz =

American actor and comedian (born 1977)

- Barinholtz in 2026
- Born: February 18, 1977 (age 49); Chicago, Illinois, U.S.
- Occupations: Actor; comedian
- Years active: 2001–present
- Spouse: Erica Hanson (m. 2009)
- Children: 3
- Father: Alan Barinholtz
- Relatives: Jon Barinholtz (brother)

Isaac “Ike” Barinholtz (born February 18, 1977) is an American actor and comedian. He is best known for his starring roles in the comedy series MADtv (2002–2007), Eastbound & Down (2012), The Mindy Project (2012–2017), Bless the Harts (2019–2021), The Afterparty (2022), History of the World, Part II (2023), and The Studio (2025–present), the last having earned him a Critics' Choice Award and an Actor Award, along with a nomination for a Primetime Emmy Award.

His films include Disaster Movie (2008), Neighbors (2014), Sisters (2015), Neighbors 2: Sorority Rising (2016), Suicide Squad (2016), Snatched (2017), Blockers (2018), Late Night (2019), The Hunt (2020), and The Unbearable Weight of Massive Talent (2022). He co-wrote the action comedy film Central Intelligence (2016), and directed, wrote, produced, and starred in the comedy film The Oath (2018).

On February 2, 2023, he won the inaugural primetime season of Celebrity Jeopardy!, winning $1,000,000 for charity, Pacific Clinics, and placed as a semifinalist in the 2024 Tournament of Champions. On August 14, 2024, he and his father, Alan, became the first duo and the second celebrities overall to win the $1,000,000 top prize for their charity, the ASL Program at Los Encinos School, and the fifteenth overall million dollar winners on Who Wants to Be a Millionaire. He also previously won $125,000 for his charity, Uplift Family Services, on April 22, 2020. To date, Barinholtz is the eleventh highest-earning game show contestant of all time, having accumulated $1,835,000 on his game show appearances.

== Early life, family, and education ==
Barinholtz grew up in Chicago's Lakeview neighborhood, the son of Peggy and Alan Barinholtz, an attorney and actor. His brother Jon Barinholtz is also an actor. Barinholtz has described his parents as "liberal people with great senses of humor", and said that he was raised in a "very funny home". Barinholtz is Jewish.

He attended Bernard Zell Anshe Emet Day School and then The Latin School of Chicago for high school, where he played on the school's Scholastic Bowl team when it won the state championship in 1994; he also competed in the 1994 Texaco Star National Academic Championship, held at Rice University. He worked at a telemarketing company and as a busboy before starting a career in comedy.

Barinholtz attended Boston University. After dropping out of college, he worked for the Chicago Transit Authority before starting his comedy career. In a 2013 interview, he said he dropped out of school because he hated it and was doing poorly. In a 2012 phone interview, Barinholtz said he was inspired to pursue a career in comedy after attending a comedy show at The Vic Theatre. Thereafter, he took comedy classes at The Second City, ImprovOlympic and Annoyance Theatre. He had planned on becoming a politician but instead decided to move to Los Angeles to be an actor.

== Career ==
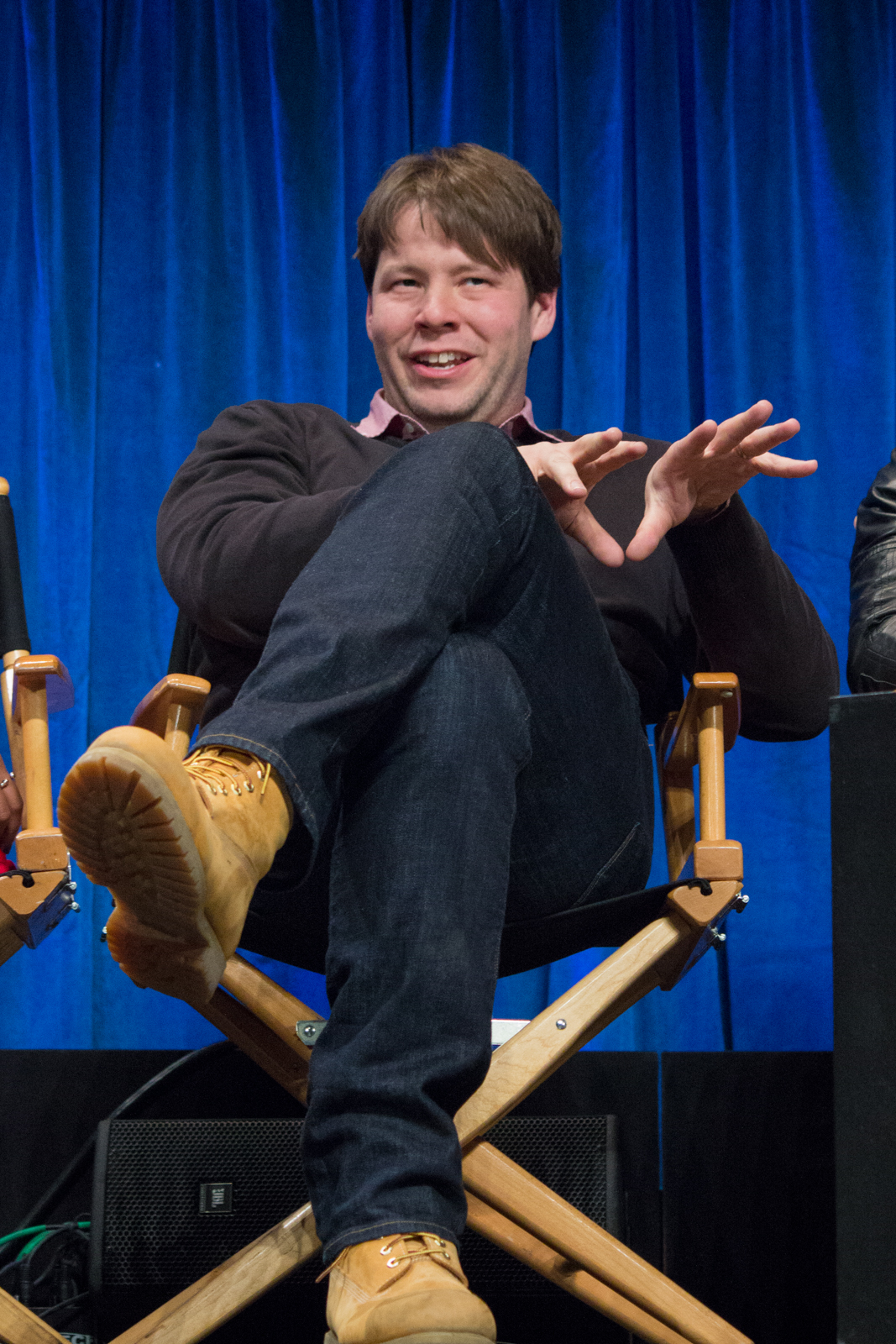
Barinholtz at PaleyFest 2013

Barinholtz spent two years in Amsterdam with the famed comedy troupe Boom Chicago along with Jordan Peele, Josh Meyers, and Nicole Parker. Barinholtz hosted the 'Worst of Boom Night' during the troupe's 10-year anniversary show, in which they performed their worst material from previous shows.

In 2009, he performed at the Chicago Improv Festival alongside former MADtv cast member Jordan Peele. In 2012, Barinholtz performed at another Chicago Improv Festival event with his brother, Jon.

He is a founding member of The Lindbergh Babies, an improv group directed by Del Close, who worked with John Belushi, Bill Murray, Mike Myers, and Chris Farley. In 2012, Barinholtz joined the cast of the third season of the HBO series Eastbound & Down, playing the role of Ivan Dochenko, Kenny Powers' Russian rival. He starred alongside Seth Rogen in the 2014 comedy Neighbors, as well as its 2016 sequel. Also in 2016, Barinholtz played prison guard Griggs in the DC Comics film Suicide Squad.

He has frequently worked with comedian Dave Stassen, with whom he attended high school. They co-wrote a SPIKE pilot in which Barinholtz also starred, Mega Winner, and the 2016 film Central Intelligence.

Barinholtz appeared in a regular role as nurse Morgan Tookers on the comedy series The Mindy Project. He was also a writer and story editor on the series. He also has a role in Friends from College, a Netflix original. In 2022, Barinholtz was in the main cast of the Apple TV+ mystery comedy series The Afterparty.

Competing on the first season of Celebrity Jeopardy! on ABC in 2022–23, Barinholtz defeated Patton Oswalt and Wil Wheaton in the finals to win the championship. He earned $1,000,000 for his charity, Pacific Clinics, and, due to rule changes, became the first celebrity champion to receive a berth to the Tournament of Champions. Competing in 2024, Barinholtz won his quarterfinal match against 13-game winner Ray Lalonde and 3-game winner Melissa Klapper, before losing in the semifinals. An article in Slate described Barinholtz as the "chaos agent Jeopardy! needed".

Since 2025, Barinholtz has been starring in the critically acclaimed Apple TV+ comedy series The Studio as Sal Saperstein, a role which earned him the Critics' Choice Award for Best Supporting Actor in a Comedy Series. After the show's first season, Barinholtz also received nominations for a Primetime Emmy Award and an Actor Award.

In July 2025, he was officially confirmed to portray Elon Musk in Luca Guadagnino's upcoming AI‑themed film Artificial, a comedic drama centered on the internal turmoil at OpenAI.

He is expected to star in CoComelon: The Movie, which will be released in 2027.

=== MADtv ===
Barinholtz officially joined the cast of MADtv in 2002 as a featured performer for the eighth season. He was later promoted to a repertory performer status the following season. Barinholtz often paired up with fellow cast member Josh Meyers in various sketches for the eighth and ninth seasons similar to the Mike Myers/Dana Carvey and Jimmy Fallon/Horatio Sanz duos on Saturday Night Live. Barinholtz also paired up with fellow cast member Bobby Lee in some of his sketches in the later seasons. Some of his famous characters included Abercrombie & Fitch model Dutch and Principal Lankenstein from the Coach Hines sketches.

Barinholtz's celebrity impressions included Abraham Lincoln, Alex Trebek, Andy Dick, Arnold Schwarzenegger, Ashton Kutcher, Bo Bice, Cris Judd, Dane Cook, Felicity Huffman, Fidel Castro, George Michael, Howard Dean, Howie Long, Jack Osbourne, Kevin Federline, Mark Wahlberg, Clay Aiken, Matt Damon, Nick Lachey, Nick Nolte, Orlando Bloom, Pat Sajak, Ralph Nader, Rafael Palmeiro, Tom Hanks, and Vin Diesel.

In 2007, he decided not to renew his contract for the 13th season of MADtv. Barinholtz has commented that he started getting "restless" and did not see eye to eye with some of the MADtv bosses about how decisions were being made.

==== Characters ====
Character	Sketch	Notes
Adam Bice	QVC: Quacker Factory	
Eli	The B.S.	
Astroman		
Duncan Kruskal	The Silver Fox	
Dutch	Abercrombie & Fitch	
Jeffrey "Jeff" DeShazer	Coach Hines	
Marty	Knobs	
Mitchel "Mitch" Ruffin		
Principal Lankenstein	Coach Hines	He is the principal of St. Francis High and Coach Hines' nemesis.
Roy Schenk	Feuding Parents	
Steven "Steve" Wellington		

== Personal life ==
Barinholtz is married and has three daughters. While shooting the film Blockers, he suffered an accident doing a stunt involving a fall. He suffered two fractured cervical vertebrae in his neck.

== Filmography ==
=== Film ===
Year	Title	Role	Notes
2001	Down	Assistant Milligan/Niles Benson	
2007	Bunny Whipped	Joe	
2008	Meet the Spartans	Various	
2008	Disaster Movie	Various	
2009	Shrink	Steve	Uncredited
2010	How to Make Love to a Woman	David	
2010	Vampires Suck	Bobby White	Uncredited
2010	For Christ's Sake	Buster Chery	
2014	Neighbors	Jimmy Blevins	
2015	Sisters	James	
2016	Neighbors 2: Sorority Rising	Jimmy Blevins	
2016	The Angry Birds Movie	Tiny	Voice
2016	Central Intelligence	None	Writer
2016	Suicide Squad	Griggs	
2016	Storks	Miscellaneous Storks	Voice
2017	Snatched	Jeffrey Middleton	
2017	Mark Felt: The Man Who Brought Down the White House	Angelo Lano	
2017	The Disaster Artist	Himself	Cameo
2017	Bright	Pollard	
2018	Blockers	Hunter Lockwood	
2018	Song of Back and Neck	Nurse	
2018	The Oath	Chris Montana	Also writer, producer, and director
2019	Late Night	Daniel Tennant	
2019	The Lego Movie 2: The Second Part	Lex Luthor	Voice
2020	The Hunt	Moses / Staten Island	
2021	Moxie	Mr. Davies	
2022	The Unbearable Weight of Massive Talent	Martin Etten	
2024	Orion and the Dark	Light	Voice
2026	Artificial	Elon Musk	
2027	CoComelon: The Movie †		Voice; post-production
2027	Naughty †		Filming
TBA	The Bell Jar †	Lenny	Post-production

=== Television ===
Year	Title	Role	Notes
2002–2007, 2016	MADtv	Various characters	116 episodes; also writer
2005	E! Hollywood Hold'em	Himself	Episode: "Laura Prepon"
2008	Family Guy	Dane Cook	Voice, episode: "I Dream of Jesus"
2008–2009	Rita Rocks	Fly	6 episodes
2010	Weeds	Daryl	Episode: "Fran Tarkenton"
2010–2015	The League	Frank "The Body" Gibiatti	4 episodes
2011	Childrens Hospital	Peter Principato	Episode: "Newsreaders"
2012	Eastbound & Down	Ivan Dochenko	6 episodes
2012	NTSF:SD:SUV::	Maitre'D	Episode: "Sabbath-tage"
2012	Megawinner	Cliff Planker	Television film; also writer and executive producer
2012–2017	The Mindy Project	Morgan Tookers	115 episodes; also writer and executive story editor
2013	Drunk History	August Spies	Episode: "Chicago"
2013	High School USA!	Cyber Bully	Voice, episode: "Bullies"
2013	The Soup	Himself	Episode dated October 23
2013	The Pete Holmes Show	Himself	Episode: "Ike Barinholtz"
2013–2015	The Awesomes	Muscleman	Voice, 30 episodes
2014	Kroll Show	Zach Sword	Episode: "Oh Armond"
2014	Chozen	Hunter	Voice, 4 episodes
2014	Married	Bruce	Episode: "The Old Date"
2014	Garfunkel and Oates	First Door on the Right Director	Episode: "Hair Swap"
2014	@midnight	Himself	Episode dated January 8
2014	American Dad!	DJ Iron Monkey	Voice, episode: "Blonde Ambition"
2016	Animals.	Alan	Voice, episode: "Pigeons."
2017	Friends from College	Degrasso	2 episodes
2017	Neo Yokio	Jeffrey	Voice, episode: "Hamptons Water Magic"
2019	Brooklyn Nine-Nine	Gintars Irbe	Episode: "Gintars"
2019	The Twilight Zone	Mike	Episode: "Not All Men"
2019	What Just Happened??! with Fred Savage	Himself	Episode: "Elevator"
2019	Live in Front of a Studio Audience	Michael Stivic	Episode: "Norman Lear's All in the Family and The Jeffersons"
2019–2021	Bless the Harts	Wayne Edwards	Voice, 34 episodes
2020, 2024	Who Wants to Be a Millionaire	Himself	2 episodes
2020	Mapleworth Murders	Richard Belt	3 episodes
2021–2022	Chicago Party Aunt	Mark	Voice, 15 episodes; also writer and executive producer
2022	The Afterparty	Brett	8 episodes
2022	Central Park		Voice, episode: "A Hot Dog to Remember"
2022–2023	American Auto	Landon Payne	2 episodes
2022–2026	Celebrity Jeopardy!	Himself	5 episodes
2023	History of the World, Part II	Various	8 episodes; also writer and executive producer
2023	White House Plumbers	Jeb Stuart Magruder	3 episodes
2024	Jeopardy Tournament of Champions	Himself	2 episodes
2024	Curb Your Enthusiasm	Shimon	Episode: "The Gettysburg Address"
2024–2025	The Simpsons	Wayne the Grip	Voice, 3 episodes
2025	Bob's Burgers	Breckin	Voice, episode: "Mr. Safebody"
2025	Tales of the Teenage Mutant Ninja Turtles	Todd	Voice, 2 episodes
2025–present	Running Point	Benny Bradzackis	2 episodes; also co-creator, writer, executive producer
2025–present	The Studio	Sal Saperstein	Main cast
2026	Life, Larry and the Pursuit of Unhappiness	Henry Ford	Episode: "Deepthroat"

=== Video games ===
Year	Title	Voice role	Notes
2016	Call of Duty: Infinite Warfare	A.J.	

=== Audio ===
Year	Title	Role	Author	Production company
2021	Batman: The Audio Adventures	Two-Face/Harvey Dent	Dennis McNicholas	Blue Ribbon Content
2023	White House Plumbers Podcast	Himself		

== Awards and nominations ==
Year	Award	Category	Work	Result
2013	Writers Guild of America Awards	New Series	The Mindy Project	Nominated
2024	Writers Guild of America Awards	Comedy/Variety – Sketch Series	History of the World, Part II	Nominated
2025	Primetime Emmy Awards	Outstanding Supporting Actor in a Comedy Series	The Studio	Nominated
2026	Critics' Choice Television Awards	Best Supporting Actor in a Comedy Series	The Studio	Won
2026	Actor Awards	Outstanding Performance by a Male Actor in a Comedy Series	The Studio	Nominated
2026	Actor Awards	Outstanding Performance by an Ensemble in a Comedy Series	The Studio	Won
