= The Oath (2018 film) =

- Theatrical release poster
- Directed by: Ike Barinholtz
- Written by: Ike Barinholtz
- Produced by: Ike Barinholtz; Raymond Mansfield; Sean McKittrick; Andrew C. Robinson; David Stassen
- Starring: Ike Barinholtz; Tiffany Haddish; Nora Dunn; Chris Ellis; Jon Barinholtz; Meredith Hagner; Carrie Brownstein; Billy Magnussen; John Cho
- Cinematography: Cary Lalonde
- Edited by: Jack Price
- Music by: Bret Mazur
- Production companies: QC Entertainment; 23/34 Pictures; Aperture Media Productions
- Distributed by: Roadside Attractions; Topic Studios
- Release dates: September 25, 2018 (LAFF); October 12, 2018 (United States)
- Running time: 93 minutes
- Country: United States
- Language: English
- Box office: $401,463

The Oath is a 2018 American black comedy film written and directed by Ike Barinholtz, in his directorial debut. In addition to Barinholtz, the film stars Tiffany Haddish, John Cho, Carrie Brownstein, Billy Magnussen, Meredith Hagner, Jon Barinholtz, Nora Dunn and Chris Ellis, and follows a politically divided family at Thanksgiving after the U.S. government asks all citizens to sign a loyalty pledge.

It had its world premiere at the Los Angeles Film Festival on September 25, 2018, and was theatrically released in the United States on October 12, 2018, by Roadside Attractions. The film received mixed reviews from critics, although Haddish's performance was praised.

== Plot ==
In the near future, American citizens are asked, though not required, to sign a legal document swearing allegiance specifically to the U.S. President (not the government) by Black Friday, the day after Thanksgiving. Meanwhile, couple Chris and Kai live a quiet suburban life with their young daughter, while Chris is deeply disturbed by the oath.

As Black Friday approaches, the young couple hosts their latest Thanksgiving dinner for their extended family. Chris's mother has made him promise not to discuss politics throughout the holiday; nonetheless, he tries to escape and catch the news whenever possible. Chris's brother Pat and his girlfriend Abbie, who have opposing political views, bother Chris throughout the entire holiday despite Kai's attempts to calm him. Chris is also disturbed to learn about the societal breakdown occurring in the nation due to the Oath's deadline, which all of his family members, including Kai, signed except for him.

On Black Friday, the family is visited by two governmental agents, Mason and Peter, who question Chris about his efforts to resist others in signing the Oath. Chris is defiant in answering the agents' questions, angering Mason, and the two quarrel. During a skirmish, Peter gets knocked out with a concussion while the family subdues and ties up Mason. For the rest of the evening, Peter, while semi-conscious, tries to negotiate with the family for their release, yet Mason continues to antagonize them with various threats. One of those threats includes the notion that the family's children will be harmed.

At this moment, Chris draws Mason's gun upon his head ready to kill him but Clark intervenes, telling the family to turn on the news, which indicates that the President has resigned and the new Acting President has revoked the Oath and its subsequent enforcement. The two agents with their authority taken away are released by Chris and Pat. The film ends with Chris and Kai peacefully eating apple pie.

== Cast ==
- Ike Barinholtz as Chris Montana, Kai's husband
- Tiffany Haddish as Kai Albert, Chris's wife
- John Cho as Agent Peter Barber
- Carrie Brownstein as Alice, Chris's sister and Clark's wife
- Billy Magnussen as Agent James Mason
- Meredith Hagner as Abbie Button, Pat's girlfriend
- Jon Barinholtz as Pat Kelmeckis, Chris's brother
- Nora Dunn as Eleanor Button, Chris's mother
- Chris Ellis as Hank Creason, Chris's father
- Matt Corboy as Clint Marks
- Jay Duplass as Clark Stewart, Alice's husband
- Priah Ferguson as Hardy Fontaine
- Henry Kaufman as Asher Wilton
- Max Greenfield as Dan Moore
- Bruce Boxleitner as Vice President Hogan

== Production ==
In September 2017, it was announced Ike Barinholtz would write, direct, and star in the film. Barinholtz produced the film alongside Sean McKittrick, Ray Mansfield, Edward H. Hamm, Jr., Andrew Robinson, and David Stassen, under their QC Entertainment and 24/34 Pictures banners, respectively. In December 2017, Tiffany Haddish, John Cho, Carrie Brownstein, Billy Magnussen, Meredith Hagner, Jon Barinholtz, Nora Dunn and Chris Ellis joined the cast. Haddish also served as an executive producer.

=== Filming ===
Principal photography began in December 2017.

== Release ==
In June 2018, Roadside Attractions and Topic Studios acquired distribution rights to the film. It had its world premiere at the Los Angeles Film Festival on September 25, 2018. The film was theatrically released on October 12, 2018.

== Reception ==
According to the review aggregator website Rotten Tomatoes, 63% of critics have given the film a positive review based on 88 reviews, with an average rating of 6/10. The website's critics consensus reads, "The Oath draws on hyper-partisan modern politics for a pointedly funny satire that hits its targets hard and often enough to more than achieve its desired discomfort." At Metacritic, the film has a weighted average score of 58 out of 100 based on 27 critics, indicating "mixed or average reviews".

Michael O'Sullivan of The Washington Post called the film's screenplay "clever and sharp," and wrote it anchors itself as "at times all-too-true-to-life."
