= Bernard Zell Anshe Emet Day School =

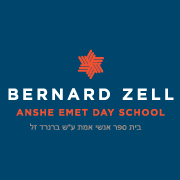

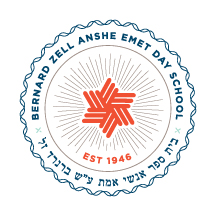

Location
- 3751 North Broadway Street; Chicago, Illinois 60613; United States

Information
- School type: Private, Jewish day school
- Established: 1946
- Head of school: Mitchell Daar
- Grades: Nursery through 8
- Enrollment: 474 (2025-26)
- Colors: Red, blue, gray
- Mascot: Eagle
- Tuition: $26,544 to $39,990
- Website: www.bernardzell.org

Bernard Zell Anshe Emet Day School (Bernard Zell) is a private Jewish day school in Lake View, Chicago that runs programs from nursery school through eighth grade. It is accredited by the National Association of Independent Schools and the Independent Schools Association of the Central States.

== History ==
In 1940, Rabbi Solomon Goldman of Anshe Emet Synagogue began to work toward the establishment of a progressive Jewish day school. At the time, most of Chicago’s Jewish students attended Chicago public schools. Anshe Emet Day School opened on September 16, 1946 with 31 students. The curriculum combined general education with Jewish values and culture, as well as Hebrew language.

The school was renamed Bernard Zell Anshe Emet Day School in 1988.

The school became a Blue Ribbon School in 1987–88. The school starts Hebrew studies for students at the age of 3.

== Notable alumni ==
- Rahm Emanuel, Chicago Mayor, former Congressman, White House Chief of Staff (Obama), and staffer (Clinton)
- Scott Simon, journalist and the host of Weekend Edition Saturday on National Public Radio.
- Dean Baker, economist, director of CEPR
- Ike Barinholtz, actor and comedian
- Yonit Levi, Israeli news anchor
- Zoe Levin, actress

== See also ==
- History of the Jews in Chicago
