= Jon Barinholtz =

American actor

- Born: December 26, 1982 (age 43); Chicago, Illinois, U.S.
- Occupations: Actor; comedian; producer
- Spouse: Annika Barinholtz (married 2016–present)
- Children: 3
- Parent(s): Alan Barinholtz, Peggy Barinholtz
- Relatives: Ike Barinholtz (brother)

Jon Barinholtz is an American actor, comedian, and producer based in Los Angeles. He has appeared in film and television, and is best known for the role of Marcus White on the NBC sitcom Superstore and Wesley Payne on the NBC sitcom American Auto.

== Early and personal life ==
Barinholtz is Jewish. He is the son of Peggy and Alan Barinholtz, an attorney and actor. His older brother is actor Ike Barinholtz.

He is married and has three children, one of whom is deaf.

== Career ==
In July 2021, Netflix announced that it had ordered a new adult animated series, Chicago Party Aunt. Barinholtz is one of the show's creators and served as an executive producer and voice actor for the series. Also in July 2021, Barinholtz was added to the main cast of the NBC sitcom American Auto, which premiered on December 13, 2021. He also serves as an executive producer of the game show The Perfect Line.

== Filmography ==
Year	Title	Role	Notes
2007	Carpeted Afterhours	Abraham Lincoln	
2009	Dear Mr. Fidrych	Barry	
2010	Outsourced	Randy	
2011	Perfect Couples	Daniel	
2011	Parks and Recreation	Kevin	
2012	Megawinner	High School Graduate	
2013	Happy Endings	Cute Guy	
2013	Agent Carter	Analyst	
2013	Getting On	Resident	
2014	Pie Guys	Jon	
2014	New Girl	Dugan	
2014	The McCarthys	Henry	
2014	Dumb and Dumber To	Inventor No. 3	
2014–2015	The Mindy Project	Pube	
2015	Key & Peele	Phillip	
2015	W/ Bob & David	Lawrence	
2016	Director's Cut	Video Assist Guy	
2016	Veep	O'Brien Aide	
2016	Attention Deficit Theater	Various roles	
2018	Alone Together	David	
2018	Dylan	Dylan S.	
2018	The Oath	Pat	
2020	It's Pony	Jeff Garbanzos	
2016–2021	Superstore	Marcus White	Recurring role, 68 episodes
2020–2025	Solar Opposites	Mascot Funbucket / Randy	
2021	Kelsey Rachelle Hewitt Gets Grounded	Ice Cream Truck Driver	
2021–2022	Chicago Party Aunt	Mikey (voice)	Main role; also creator and executive producer
2021–2023	American Auto	Wesley Payne	23 episodes
