= Food of The Bear =

Dishes prepared in-universe

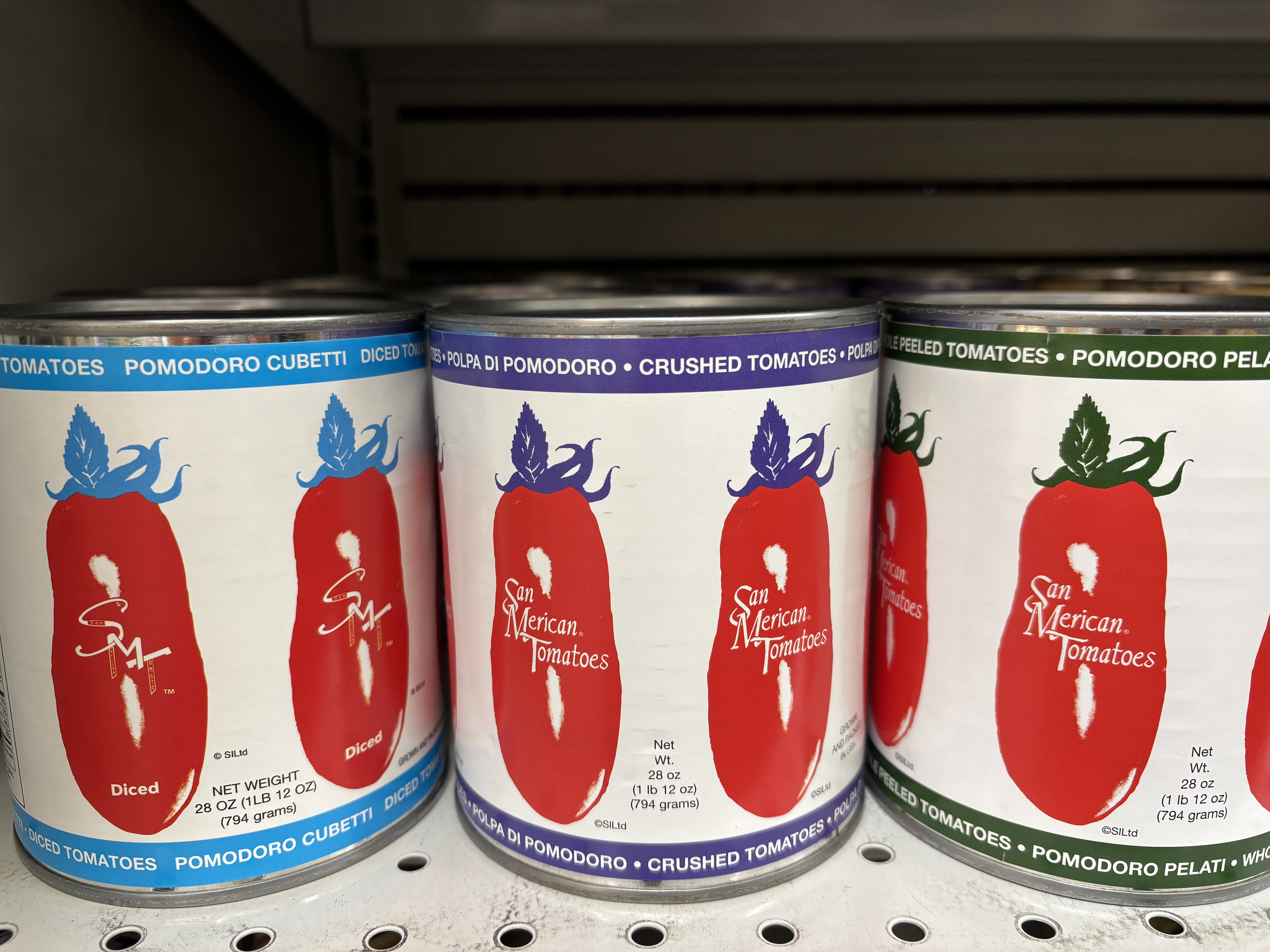
Mikey Berzatto's family-meal spaghetti-sauce recipe calls for two 28 U.S. fl oz (830 ml) cans of San Marzano tomatoes

Food is central to the storytelling and relationships on the series The Bear, a 2022–2026 episodic television show based on the world of U.S. restaurants after the COVID-19 pandemic. The two main characters, Carmy Berzatto (Jeremy Allen White) and Sydney Adamu (Ayo Edebiri), are elite chefs who work together to save the Berzatto family restaurant, a troubled Italian beef sandwich joint, and launch a new high-end dining destination called The Bear. Sydney was trained at the Culinary Institute of America, and identifies Carmy as the "best CDC at the best restaurant in the whole United States of America." The Original Beef of Chicagoland, however, is not fancy, it is a working-class lunch place, serving regular customers occupied in fields like transportation, street maintenance, and sanitation.

Season 1 centers on quick-service sandwiches, hot dogs, and doughnuts. Beginning in season 2, the chefs, together with friends and family, transform "the sauce-splattered sandwich bar into the show's titular fine-dining venture." In season 4, Carmy explains his passion for serving food in a flashback. He tells his brother that "every one of our good memories—they happened in restaurants...people go to restaurants to be taken care of, right? They go to restaurants to celebrate, to relax, to not have to think about anything else for a minute. You know, people go to restaurants to feel less lonely."

The show is about "fire, meat, knives, pastries, bread, anxiety, fear, post-traumatic stress, death, and debt [... and] all the things that must be skillfully and thoughtfully combined to conceptualize, procure, make, and serve (good/great) food." The show is about how restaurants are also places consumed with "payroll, taxes, paperwork, hygiene, plumbing, dishwashing, the grease trap, dirty floors, health inspections." The cinematography and film editing emphasizes artistic, emotional, and manual labors through "tight close-ups of the objects that are also central to the storyline in that without them the action could not occur. Plastic containers, blue labels, olive oil, salt, herbs, flour, mixers, pans, clean surfaces, clocks, walk-in refrigerator, electricity, stoves, and hands to combine, cut, sprinkle, drizzle, sear, and boil. The food could not be cooked, tasted, and eaten with relish without the human and non-human assemblages." The series connects with a larger culture through the inclusion of "highly curated" brands that "legitimize the show's validity with industry professionals. Examples of this include the jars of Kewpie Mayo in the walk-in, Fernet in the office, expensive Orwellian butter, Pepto Bismol, Tums, Al-Anon meetings, and prescription medications." Similarly, Helen Rosner of Chicagoland and The New Yorker wrote that the show's catalog of Chicago references ("Vienna Beef, Bill Murray, the hockey legend Denis Savard [...] Malört, Chicago's inexplicably beloved paint-varnish-like liquor") serve as metropolitan shibboleths.

Seemingly "trivial," backgrounded details ("a receipt, a hat, and a hot dog") construct a "taste‑based" sense of time and place. On the whole, The Bear "positions individual dishes as signifiers of family histories and vessels of the characters' creative anxiety, as well as staple elements of Chicago's urban culture."

== Culinary production ==
Culinary producer Courtney "Coco" Storer is an experienced chef and sister of series creator Christopher Storer. She trained the actors on key dishes in her converted-garage catering kitchen. Chris Storer can also cook; Joel McHale initially knew Storer as the boyfriend of his Community costar Gillian Jacobs and "a really good chef." C. J. Capace is culinary co-producer. The culinary production team includes Nicole Biyani, chef Brian Lockwood, chef Justin Selk, Danielle Stefanick, Jeffrey Thomas, and Gabriel Wallace. Chris Zucchero (Chi-Chi) is second-generation owner of Mr. Beef, the restaurant that inspired the Original Beef. Matty Matheson (Fak) is a chef and cookbook author. Others contributors include Dave Beran, Daniel Boulud, Curtis Duffy and Amy Cordell of Ever and After, Tim Flores and Genie Kwon of Kasama, Thomas Keller, Rob Levitt of Publican Quality Meats, Malcolm Livingston II, Sarah Mispagel-Lustbader, Dylan Patel and Donnie Madia of Avec, Ana Posey and Dave Posey of Elske and Creepies, René Redzepi of Noma, produce liaison Samantha Rogers, Rosio Sanchez, and Alpana Singh.

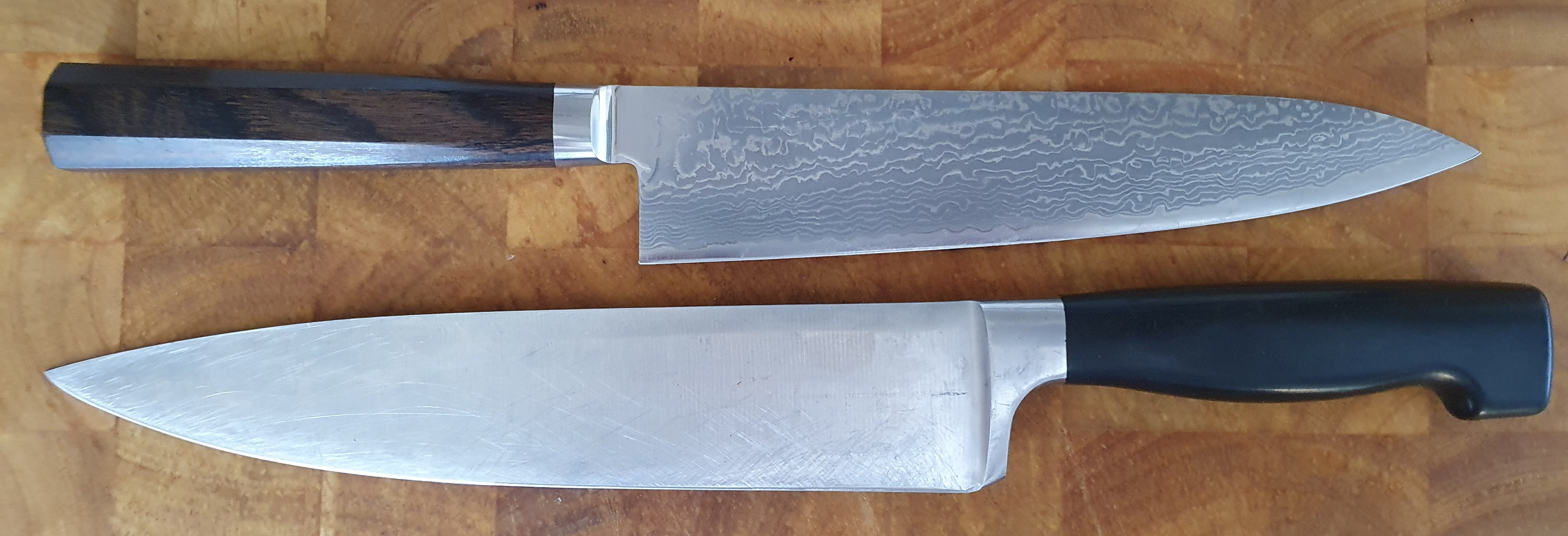
Chef's knives

There is a culinary reference guide for every episode, in part because the Bear aspires to be a Michelin-level restaurant, which is "very precise in how they set things up." The restaurant set at Cinespace is "outfitted with working gas stovetops and professional ovens so the cast can [...] feel hot and sweaty and can smell onions caramelizing (or burning), or a sauce boiling over." White, in particular, chops "a lot of onions" over the course of the series. Cinematographer Andrew Wehde said of season 1, "We just kept shooting inserts and giving all that information to editorial, it created a lot of that kinetic energy...even down to the point that Jeremy Allen White, who's our lead, would cut celery and carrots and onions, and prep the bins" while they set up. Joanna Naugle told a film-editing podcast, "Sometimes we're like, 'We should use this shot where we [tilt] up from Carmy chopping [...] to be like, This is Jeremy! This isn't a double.'"

With a handful of caveats, the presentation of American restaurants has been deemed authentic. Real restaurants would not put a 22 US qt (21 L) Cambro of veal stock on the top shelf of the walk-in; a review would not be based on a comped one-off dish; walk-in fridges do not lock shut like that; and there would be zero stabbings, not so much yelling, probably more casual sex, and so forth. Chris Storer said the production aspired to maybe "50 percent" accuracy on "chef stuff". Guest star Grant Achatz said in 2024, "Kudos to them for meticulously and thoroughly understanding the language, the movement, the stress, the anxiety, the pressure of running a restaurant like that."

== Season 1: The Original Beef of Chicagoland ==
The Original Beef of Chicagoland began as "a mom-and-pop sandwich shop" run by the Berzatto parents. As managed by Carmy's now-dead older brother Michael Berzatto (Jon Bernthal), the River North restaurant is a cozy, grungy "greasy spoon" with familiar food, stained walls, and a terrifying toilet. Carmy inherits the restaurant, displacing Mikey's best friend, their "cousin" Richie Jerimovich (Ebon Moss-Bachrach), who had been running the place, and with help from Sydney, begins reforming service, systems, and fare. With the stated goal of "I can't keep yelling at them every day," Carmy asks Syd to institute the kitchen brigade system, developed by Auguste Escoffier, who codified many traditional culinary practices, including the mother sauces, and used the "structure and duties of a military brigade" as the basis for a hierarchy of 20 specific cook positions. (Note: In seasons 1 and 5, Carmy and Luca tournant, meaning "can work all stations in the kitchen.") Ebra (Edwin Lee Gibson) connects the dots between military and restaurant when he comments, "I was in a brigade once. Many people died." Carmy and Syd institute a process called recategorization: "Previously operating with a flat structure and unclear assignments [...] [the sous-chef] introduces daily routines like a pre-shift meeting, front-of-the-house walkthrough, and end-of-the-day review, fostering internal work coordination...the new work systems faced pushback, with one chef even responding, 'No hablo inglés.' However, over time [...] [the changes] improved operations and enhanced team culture." These benefits contrast with the "cultural caricature" of the brigade, which "includes cooks screaming Yes, chef! in unison like soldier-hostages beset with Stockholm syndrome."

- Carmy – chef de cuisine, meaning head chef, unless there is an executive chef
- Sydney – sous chef, from the French language prefix sous, meaning under or sub-; answers only to head chef (by analogy, colonel to Carmy's brigadier general), supervises everyone else; also, saucier, a sauce chef (Note: In season 2, Carmy becomes exec chef, Syd becomes CDC, and Tina is asked to train as Syd's sous.)
- Ebra – chef de partie is a station chef, in Ebra's case, "grill master"
- Tina (Liza Colón-Zayas) – chef garde manger preps "cold" dishes, and manages ingredients and supplies
- Marcus (Lionel Boyce) – pâtissier is the in-house baker

Season 1 revels in ostentatious food porn, both sweet and savory, replete with "glistening sauces, juicy slices of beef, meat always sizzling in the background." Edebiri once described Marcus and jelly-filled doughnuts as the show's "sexiest relationship."

=== Italian beef sandwiches topped with giardiniera ===
An Italian beef sandwich is a very regional sandwich, less famous (pre-Bear) than its cousins the Philadelphia cheesesteak or the Florida Cuban. Chicagoans call them beefs. The Italian beef experience is "a 6–8 in (15–20 cm) long sandwich filled with thin-sliced marinated meat on a French roll drenched in juice and swaddled tightly in waxed paper or insulated foil wrap". French fries and a "cup of Italian ice served with a plastic straw that has a spoon on one end" are common accompaniments.

The sandwiches nod to Chicago's history as the 19th- and 20th-century "meat capital of the United States," when cowboys drove beef cattle from western ranch lands to the meat-packing districts that employed thousands of men at Fulton Market and at the Union Stock Yards on the South Side. (Note: The Chicago Bulls basketball team is named for the city's meat-packing history.) Under the Italian beef program a Chicago community could stretch a little affordable meat to feed a lot of people. The beef is seasoned with oregano, basil, garlic, red and black pepper, and then "roasted slowly, partially submerged in beef stock." The beef should be shaved thin. Zucchero's recommended order is "hot, sweet, and juicy," meaning a beef with "hot peppers, which is the giardiniera; sweet peppers, which is bell peppers; and dipped." According to the Chicago Tribune, if the sandwich is "dipped" in the gravy ("jus"), it "often comes out looking like a waterlogged roll of paper towels." One Chicago writer described a beef as a "soggy Proustian gut volcano of past and present joy."

Richie says the Original Beef of Chicagoland has been doing things the same way for 25 years, and Jimmy Kalinowski (Oliver Platt) volunteers that the success of Ed Debevic's in River North inspired the Berzatto dad to open a restaurant. In season 2, there is a recipe for "giardiniera by Nonna" on index cards taped to the office bookshelf. Nonna means grandmother in Italian.

=== Family meal ===
Carmy's first assignment to stagiaire ("staging, pronounced stahj-ing") Sydney is "We—you're gonna make family," referring to "family meal," or "staff meal," for the restaurant employees. Family meal ensures "that everyone gets fed before their long and often hunger-inducing dinner shift. [At the Beef], the chefs take turns [...] to ensure cooking a giant dish for everyone to share." Sydney found unused bananas in the walk-in that Carmy had intended for "a play on a panettone" (a traditional Italian cake). She made beef stew, fried plantains, coconut rice, and a fennel salad. Carmy took a bite during prep and declared "That's fire, chef," but did not sit down and eat with everyone else. This selectivity is common: "often chefs only pick at bits of food here and there to taste-test."

Family meal in "Brigade" is Ebra's chicken suqaar, a Somali dish. One food writer commented that suqaar "makes perfect sense" given the ingredients on hand. In the season 1 finale, Tina asks "Who's on family?" and Carmy says, "I got it today, chef." He makes the "I love you dude" spaghetti. Executive producer Josh Senior said of the shots backed by Radiohead's "Let Down": "We always wanted to end it with a family meal...with these people together." In season 2's penultimate episode, an unseen character shouts over a shot of Sydney, "Family meal up front, y'all." The season 3 finale begins with a flashback to Thomas Keller paternally teaching Carmy how to make roast chicken for family meal at the French Laundry. Family meal in season 5 is beef, and fried Brussels sprouts.

=== Carmy at home ===
Carmy has gourmet skills, but at home he makes a peanut butter and jelly sandwich, a "meal staple of the worker." A chef who worked in Michelin-starred kitchens wrote in Bon Appétit that this was authentic; after her shift she would fall asleep on the couch "with my hand in a bag of chips." In early episodes of the series, the restaurant is the only place where "meaningful relationships develop." Carmy's "spartan" apartment "is a space that is rarely explored," while "the restaurant is a place constructed meaningfully, encapsulating histories and significant aspirations."

=== Chicago-style hot dogs ===
The "you're a child asshole" discourse, and Carmy's hunt for ketchup in "Dogs" is about the Chicago-style hot dog standard he is disrupting for the sake of the client at this children's birthday party. Per the Chicago Food Encyclopedia, Chicago-style hot dogs are known for "an elaborate style of toppings...and never, ever is ketchup allowed on the hot dog." When Richie elsewhere yells "drag it through the garden," that means top the dog with celery salt, green pickled sport peppers, mustard, onions, pickles, relish, and tomato wedges. Hot dogs suggest Chicago identity, "its people, and memories, accessed through taste."

=== Sydney's cola-braised short ribs ===
In "Sheridan," while prepping a paillard for Carmy's mom's chicken piccata, Syd suggests new dishes ("a play on tongue-in-cheek?"), but Carmy is hesitant. The stock that Sydney asks Carmy to help her strain is an étouffée, a spicy Creole cuisine crayfish and vegetable stew.

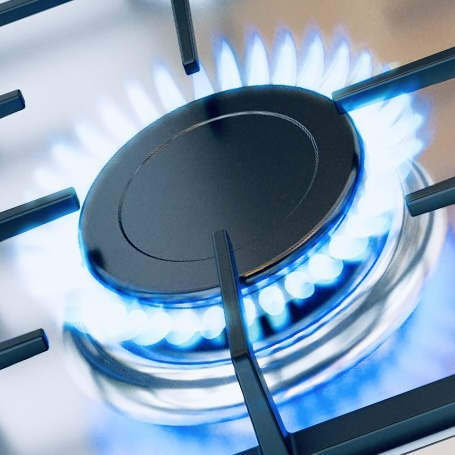
The series opens with a dark screen and the sound of two gas burners igniting

In "Ceres," Sydney presents a cola-braised short ribs and risotto dish. Short ribs are a cut of beef (derived the chuck and short plate cuts) that is "very tough and require[s] long, slow, moist-heat cooking." According to Food & Wine, "On television and in real life, nothing is cozier [...] Here, per Sydney's creativity, classic wine-and-stock braising liquid get a surprising addition from cola, which balances the savory with a touch of complex sweetness to create a smooth, rich sauce." The dish is also economical, in that it potentially makes use of ingredients already in stock, such as beef, tomatoes, and Coca-Cola Company and Sprecher Brewery soft drinks. Lidia Bastianich writes that risotto ("when made correctly") is as Italian as pasta, polenta, and gnocchi. Risotto is a dish made with starchy Carnaroli or Arborio rice that requires a cook's sustained focus, including 16 to 20 minutes of continuous stirring. There are multiple ways risotto can and does go wrong, especially in restaurants and/or under stressful conditions like those at the busy Beef. Syd's homey risotto demonstrates devotion and skill, but Richie has a point about timing when he asks, "What's the pickup on risotto? Feel like that's kinda crazy, right? We're not gonna do that."

Syd asks Carmy to taste the ribs and risotto. Tina says "Brava!" Ebra and Angel (José Cervantes Jr.) are impressed. Carmy rejects Sydney's proposed addition to the dinner menu as "not ready"—her sauce is "a little tight." Syd agrees to loosen the sauce, meaning make it more liquid and less concentrated. Later, Syd burns her shallots when Carmy texts her a second critique, that it lacks for an acidic component. Nevertheless, the dish, with its "surprising ribbon of brine," wins a rave in the fictional Chicago Telegraph. At the Ever funeral in season 3, when a chef recounts his mentor's public praise of an innovative ganache, Sydney mentally revisits Carmy's rejection of this dish. In season 5, Sydney discloses that her short ribs were inspired by something her mother had once made.

After they quit in "Review," Sydney invites Marcus to her apartment and makes a pan-seared Chilean sea bass with an "Alain Passard-inspired" tomato confit. (Note: Passard serves tomate confite aux douze saveurs (transl. tomato confit with 12 flavors), a "spice-and-caramel-braised" tomato dessert, at his restaurant L'Arpège in Paris.) Mikey's braciole, Sydney's cola ribs, Passard's tomato confit, and Tina's season 3 Crock-Pot carne guisada all use the same cooking method, braising, earlier mentioned by Carmy: "The only beef I could get was bone-in, which you have to braise, alright? It takes two hours longer." Braising is a slow-cooking technique in which ingredients are "first browned in fat, then cooked, tightly covered, in a small amount of liquid at low heat for a lengthy period of time," which develops flavor and tenderizes the protein.

=== Richie versus expensive salad ===
Richie's "Ceres" storyline surfaces his fears about the gentrification of Chicago. Even though he never goes there, he laments the closure of the neighboring barroom. (Note: The century-old Green Door Tavern adjacent to Mr. Beef has not actually closed.) Worse, a Sweetgreen gourmet-salad place, marketed to office workers, is coming soon to The Bear's fictionalized River North. Richie expresses anxiety about the changing Chicago neighborhoods of Pilsen, Wicker Park, and Logan Square. These places have "undergone significant changes in recent years...historically Latino but have seen an increase in 'hip' new restaurants and bars...[a Sweetgreen] indicates a shift towards catering to an entirely different demographic [...] [that favors] bourgeois taste [...] where the food, music, drinks, décor, and customers' behavior reflect whiteness and class privilege'." "Unmotivated white, male, vulgar, and antagonistic" Richie seemingly feels opportunity passing him by. Conversely, "determined, Black, female, thoughtful, and generous" Sydney creates an increasingly secure position for herself in the "delicate ecosystem" of the family restaurant. She resolves the gangster turf crisis with communication and Green River soda pop: "'It's handled', is all she says, as an eyeline match reverses the shot back to Richie standing away, his help unwanted." The world coming to Richie's doorstep fuels his insecurities about Carmy, whose "haute sensibilities derived from his extensive training and global travels clash with Richie's localism, which is grounded in...a particular genre of Chicago Italian American food."

=== Mikey's braciole ===
The title of the season 1 finale, "Braciole," refers to the dish of the same name. In the "Ceres" flashback, Michael can be seen sprinkling pignoli, and "nestling meat" into a 7 U.S. qt (6.6 L) blue-enameled Dutch oven. (Note: In Carmy's cooking-show nightmare, he burns his hand on the handle of another blue Dutch oven (European brand Le Crueset to Mikey's American brand Cuisinart). A Dutch oven is designed to be transferable from stovetop (sear) to oven (braise), and so has metal handles.) The Berzatto recipe calls for homemade breadcrumbs and three pounds of flank steak "butterflied and pounded thin". Courtney Storer told an interviewer that braciole is a "living, breathing dish. It takes all day to make. You have to be patient," and shared that executive producer Joanna Calo thought the finished dish looked like "a bleeding heart."

=== Mikey's family-meal spaghetti sauce ===
Mikey Berzatto left behind a recipe for spaghetti sauce on the 3" x 5" index card that amounted to his suicide note. One recipe developer theorized he was "inspired by two pretty iconic tomato sauces: Scarpetta's spaghetti with tomato and basil, and Marcella Hazan's tomato sauce with onion and butter." Mikey's pasta pomodoro recipe calls for San Marzano tomatoes, a much-esteemed paste tomato.

I love you dude.
Let it rip

Family Meal Spaghetti
–10 Garlic Cloves
–Basil Steeped in Oil
–San Marzano Tomatoes
2 28 oz cans (the smaller cans
taste better)

== Season 2: The Bears pre-game ==
The chefs set a tight deadline for opening the new restaurant and begin menu planning. Carmy explained in the season 1 finale, "I could speak through the food, like I could communicate through creativity," but with no gas line and no functioning kitchen for most of the season, Carm's expressive and emotional growth seemingly stalls.

=== Chaos menu, March–May 2023 ===
The notion of a chaos menu comes up in "Pasta," "Pop," and "Bolognese." According to Mashed, chaos cooking, like fusion cuisine, focuses "on merging food from different cultures," but also "chaos is weird and subversive, prompting you to lighten up about cooking." As explained by The Takeout, chaos is mildly unflattering, "as it implies a sort of thoughtlessness." When the idea of a chaos menu appeared in the season 2 scripts, producers Storer and Matheson did not quite know what to make of it. Per Matheson to Vulture, "It takes a long time to develop your true culinary voice [...] You don't want to shoot for the stars. What you want to do is go inward."

While brainstorming for the Bear, Sydney and Carmy consider a veal chop with demi-glace sauce, hamachi crudo, frozen Concord grapes with beef consommé and smoked bone marrow, amatriciana, and sardines in piri-piri sauce. Syd also mentions making a "gorgeous, gorgeous, gorgeous" 72-hour lamb ragù when she had her catering company. However, her fresh pasta failed, so she spooned the sauce over King's Hawaiian rolls, a California-based brand of Portuguese sweet bread. As the season progresses, food plays a heavy role in the dynamic between Sydney, Carmy, and Claire Dunlap (Molly Gordon): Sydney discloses that a ragù and pasta fail ended her catering company, a dish Carmy later makes for "Claire, his new girlfriend. Every meal we see Claire eating was [introduced via Sydney]."

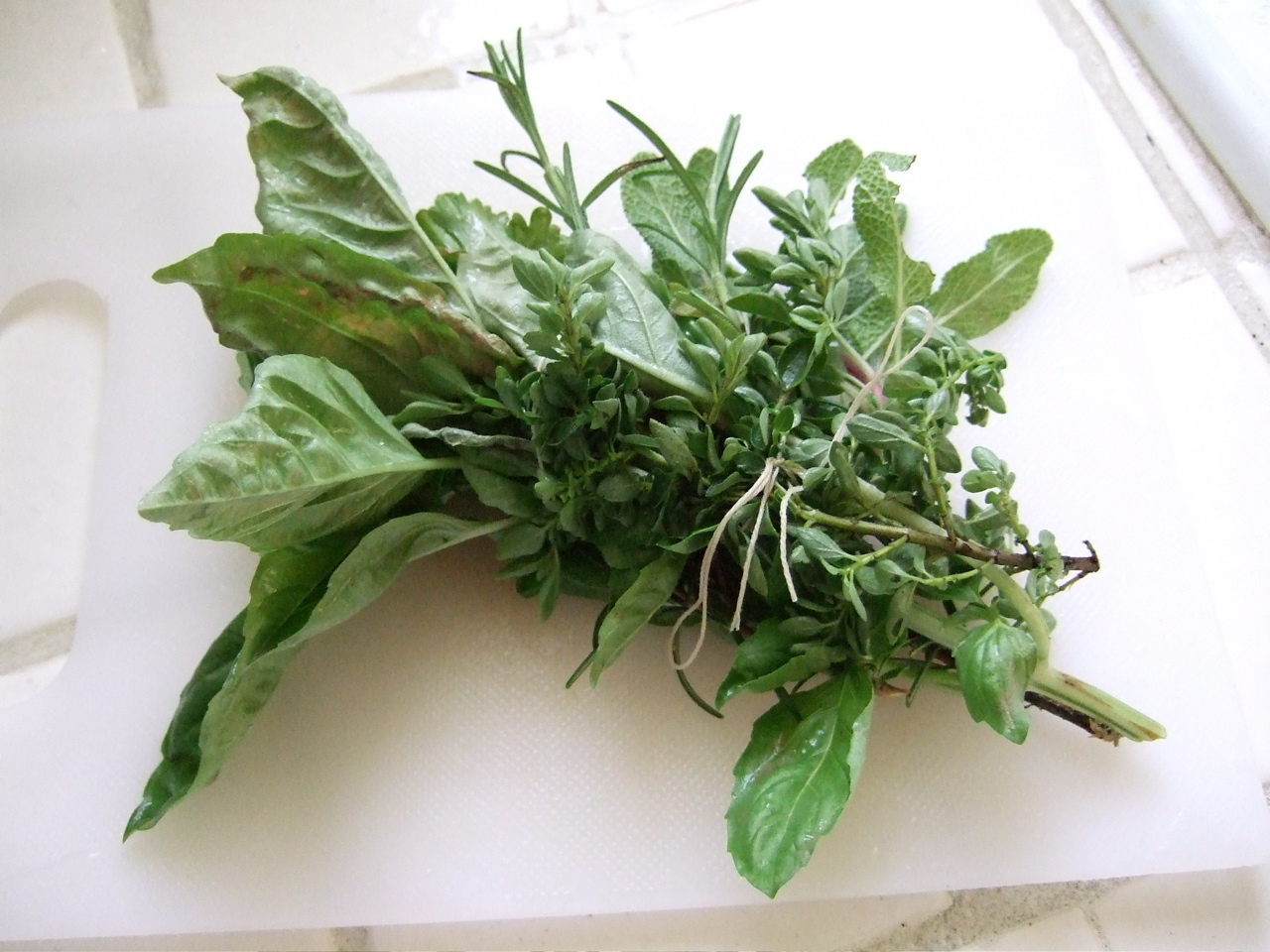
Dried culinary thyme hangs over Carmy's apartment kitchen sink in season 2; the Beef uses a salt bed and a bouquet garni of rosemary, basil, oregano, and thyme, to make mashed potatoes

Syd and Carmy's collaboration is frustrated because "despite their shared enthusiasm...sometimes it seems they do more spitting than swallowing." Carmy spits out something Syd lactofermented (too acidic). Carmy says "I must've just given you the wrong count, it's fine." Later, after Carmy teaches her the "sorry" ASL sign, Syd makes a note about the lactoferment in her culinary journal. In "Sundae," another dish goes wrong. Carmy says the component had "too much salt [...] you marinated it too long." The failed-experiment dish was something like radicchio with a saffron sauce or "marinated radicchio with burnt grapefruit and pistachio." Similarly, working with Tina in "Pop," Sydney concocts an incoherent combination involving an undetermined protein, fennel salad, flashpickled daikon, XO sauce, panzanella, 'nduja, zero-waste principles, and the four classical elements. Syd finally concludes, "It's a lot. It's a lot. I'm seeing now that it's a lot." Carmy uses this period of time to "grow closer" to Claire, but "loses track of the restaurant and, in turn, abandons Sydney in curating the new menu."

=== Sydney and the city ===
Carmy proposes a "palate reset" at Kasama, a Michelin-starred restaurant that specializes in Filipino cuisine. Owned by married couple Genie Kwon and Timothy Flores, Kasama's dishes suggest both their family-heritage foods and their classical training. Carmy ditches, so Syd dines alone. She orders mushroom adobo, the breakfast sandwich with hash browns and longanisa, and a mango-rosette tart. Syd visits Avec, where her character had once worked, and talks to Donnie Madia. The Avec team discusses the restaurant's short rib hummus dish. Rob Levitt advises Sydney on butchery, answering her questions about short ribs. Syd takes a boat tour of city landmarks, visits 88 Supermarket ("Chicago's largest Asian supermarket"), and orders thin-crust pepperoni pizza, noodles, dumplings, pierogi, and a banana split. Because food and culture are so often entangled, her tour highlights Chicago's "ethnoscape," and her experience of localized, ethnic-enclave "multicultural gastronomy" also establishes a contrast with the city's more "tourist-oriented" and generalized "fine‑dining spaces."

in the immediate moment, the tour does indeed inspire, "[Director Joanna] Calo even outfits Sydney in a 1991 Chicago Bulls World Championship shirt right before she heads to Kasama, as if noting that she, like Coach K, will lead the team to victory." As described by Matty Matheson, the producers were asking themselves, "What is an idea? What is the place? How do we make flavors? What are Sydney's flavors? Where is Sydney from? What are the things that she is proud of? What are the flavor profiles she would put into Italian food? How could she make something hers?" Sydney borrows space in the Elske kitchen and constructs a brown-butter cheese-stuffed pasta with pesto sauce, but this dish also fails.

=== Christmas dinner with the Berzattos ===
The flashback episode "Fishes" is set on Christmas Eve, at a ritual supper known as the Feast of the Seven Fishes, or La vigilia, a metonym for "the feast of the vigil of Christ." As framed by the New York Times, "Rooted in Roman Catholicism, which calls for abstaining from meat on the eve of any holiday, La vigilia tends to be a bounty of seafood." La vigilia is an extended-family gathering for "a four-to-five-hour affair of eating, involving a highly standardized procession of multiple seafood-based courses and an equally ritualized method of consumption." The Feast of the Seven Fishes is more Italian-American than Italian, what anthropologists call a "rite of intensification," designed to recruit younger, more assimilated generations into a cultural identity.

Storer created a "vision book" as she planned the menu, which brought to mind "Heartache, vibrance, colors [...] a lot of red [...] I'm a visual person, you know, when you think about a bleeding heart [...] heartache, loneliness, suffering, pain, all those things. And then holidays, Christmas, red!" Photos that inspired her included a 1960s-era Sophia Loren in full glam, presenting an eggplant dish, and "a heaping pot of meatballs in red sauce, a lot of splatter on the counter." Storer wanted a tablescape that illustrated "this stark contrast of, like, presentable beauty, and then what's underneath it. And how could you show that in food? How is that possible when all the candles are lit and all the things seemingly feel and look beautiful? What's actually underneath all of that?" American food writer M. F. K. Fisher wrote in 1949 that what's underneath is often an "ordeal of nervous indigestion, preceded by hidden resentment and ennui and accompanied by psychosomatic jitters."

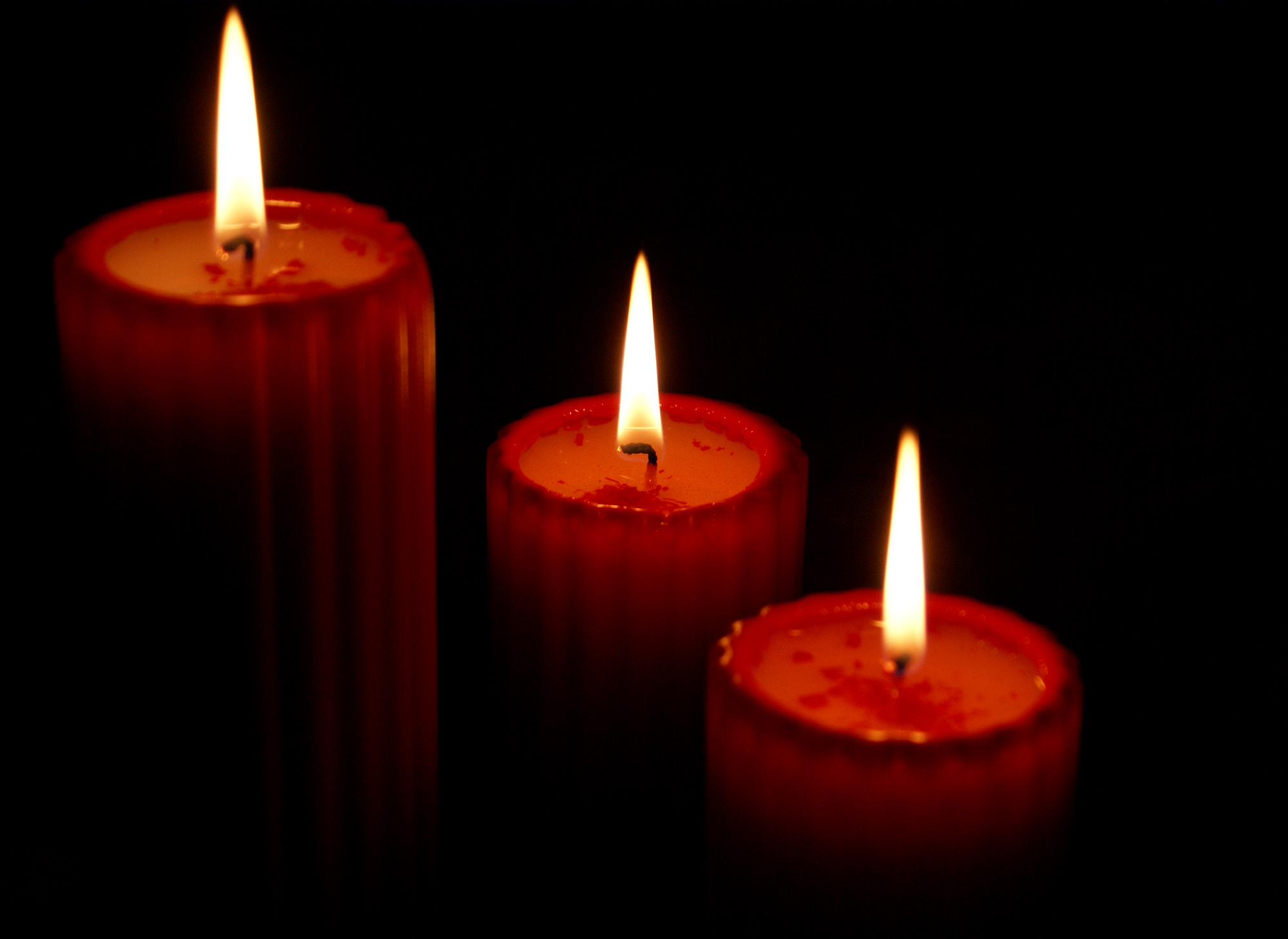
Red Christmas

Donna Berzatto's "labor-intensive" meal plan involved branzino, lobsters, oysters Rockefeller, artichokes, meatballs, gravy, roasted peppers, potatoes, and bread. Storer trained actress Jamie Lee Curtis how to rip the heads off the lobsters, which were blanched in advance by Rob Levitt. Witaske quipped in 2025 that the eighth-fish tuna casserole was his "mom's recipe." (Note: To whatever extent the cuisine of the Midwestern United States has common regional foods (dubious, debated), the list begins with covered dishes, casseroles, hotdish.) Storer joked about Bernthal and Curtis snacking on the meatballs: "Thank God I made them so good." In a Vulture interview, Storer and Matheson listed the "seven" seafood dishes: the appetizers were shrimp cocktail, smoked-fish dip, and "raw crab and prawns," and the seven main courses were branzino, steamed lobsters with drawn butter, crab claws, baked clams, baked cod, and a "marinated-mussels situation."

Carmy makes "Sprite," an uncaffeinated carbonated beverage, to help resolve pregnant Tiffany Jerimovich's (Jacobs) morning sickness. Later, uncle Jimmy tells Tiff, who thinks she can only keep down a banana, how when he was a little kid he used to get frozen bananas with his father. In the words of British GQ, "The fleeting scene is a poignant reminder not only of the emotional weight food can hold, particularly during grief, but how it can nourish us by connecting us to those we've lost, no matter how much time has passed." The episode ends with one of Mikey's chucked forks quivering out of tray stacked with cannoli (baked tubes of pastry dough filled with a "rich citrus-scented ricotta-mascarpone" cream).

=== Richie studies hospitality ===
In "Forks," Richie reads Will Guidara's 2022 book Unreasonable Hospitality. This led one chef to theorize that serving Pequod's at The Bear's Ever was "based on an old legend that on request, Eleven Madison Park once ran across Madison Square to the original Shake Shack kiosk to grab burgers for a guest." A variation has it that Guidara once made a "quick run to buy a dirty-water dog that [chef Daniel] Humm cheffed up with quenelles of sauerkraut and relish and delivered" to tourists who "had mentioned they were leaving town without tasting a New York hot dog."

Chicago food writers excoriated chef Adam Shapiro (Adam Shapiro) for having "mutilated" a Pequod's pizza, writing that "no microbasil is required" and "its famous caramelized crust, produced by burning mozzarella on the edges of a cast-iron pan, is shorn away." Months later, in season 4's "Scallop," Richie trusts Carmy to plate a beef sandwich while the front of house assembles an out-of-season snow day, complete with Swiss Miss hot chocolate and marshmallows, wowing a teen cancer survivor and another guest, dining alone, Mr. Clark.

In an otherwise empty kitchen at Ever, Andrea Terry (Olivia Colman) peels crimini mushrooms for lamb des Tournelles. (Note: Selle d'agneau des Tournelles rôtie aux herbes (transl. herb-roasted saddle of lamb) originated at La Tour d'Argent, Quai de la Tournelle, Paris.) She teaches Richie how to do this basic prep work "and the two begin a substantive, vulnerable, and pleasant conversation which lands upon the theme of living well. Terry articulates the good life in terms of 'time well spent'...an act of care which will prompt within diners the realization that 'someone took the time to do this'...although it is also difficult to deny that fine dining aesthetics typically do rely on very particular details as part of the imperative to accumulate capital and prestige." A food writer for The Globe and Mail argued that Anthony Bourdain would have called "a high-end restaurant comping dinner for a pair of schoolteachers [...] a hollow defence that fine dining is not all about serving luxury food to rich people."

=== Carmy's bolognese for Claire ===
When the restaurant stoves finally start working in "Bolognese," Carmy immediately makes a pan-seared, thyme-garnished T-bone steak. After work he buys ingredients for dinner for Claire. Bucatini is a long tube noodle (like a cross between ziti and spaghetti). To forestall tangling, Carm coils the noodles into bird's nests. The sauce is Bolognese, a type of ragù, a "thick, full-bodied" sauce from northern Italy. One writer described this dish as "simple," but "there is no doubt in our mind that Carmen Berzatto would whip you up with one of the best bolognese sauces you've had in your life—especially if he was falling in love with you".

=== Sydney's omelette for Sugar ===
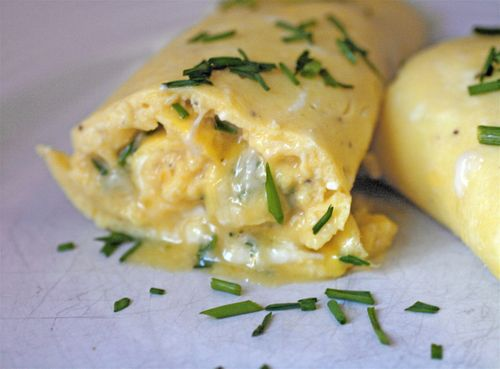
French omelette garnished with chives

Syd serves pregnant Natalie juice (orange–blood orange blend) and a modified French omelette, which "demonstrates that taking care of others is the essence of hospitality, and serving others helps foster a sense of connection and satisfaction." French omelettes are thinner and cook faster than American omelettes, and the ingredients are limited to eggs, butter, and maybe cheese. Whisking the eggs through a sieve is crucial. According to restaurateur Abe Beame, Syd's omelette technique is "more or less flawless, although, if I may nitpick, the pan doesn't seem hot enough, because the butter isn't 'singing' as it should when it first hits the pan, and she pipes a thin tube of Boursin onto the setting eggs, a major no-no (but almost certainly delicious, based on Ludo Lefevbre's omelet recipe). Extra point for rubbing butter onto the rolled omelet on the plate, and the textural chip crumble with chive garnish spoke directly to my Jewish palate." Lefevbre uses the cracked black pepper Boursin. Edebiri and culinary producer Storer tested 14 kinds of chips and settled on a salt-and-vinegar flavor.

In 2026, White correlated The Bear's omelette with the cinematically significant omelettes in Big Night (1996) and Phantom Thread (2017). The scene itself is "consoling." However, Edebiri has said she ate so many omelettes during prep that "I can't eat eggs" anymore. While shooting the scene, Elliott "needed a spit bucket," because her real-world "pregnancy had given her an aversion to eggs."

Carmy uses a similar chip topping in "Tomorrow," which he and Syd call a "Boulud nod," meaning inspired by Daniel Boulud's signature dish of "crisp paupiettes of sea bass in Barolo sauce." Boulud teaches Carmy how to make this dish in flashback, and Lee Lane (Bob Odenkirk) references it in "Bears," when he tells Carmy, "[Mikey] said you wrapped fish in potato?" (Note: Boulud demonstrates cutting leeks for the Barolo sauce. "Black-tie sea scallops," which are scallops with truffle wrapped in spinach and puff pastry, is the other signature dish that Boulud teaches Carmy.)

=== Friends & Family Night ===
The Bear opens in "Omelette" and "The Bear," on Friday, May 26, 2023. The menu for the restaurant's soft opening, also known as Friends & Family Night: 1. Focaccia / lardo / prosciutto 2. Welcome broth / grapes 3. ~~Tuna crudo / white bean~~ 4. Cannoli 5. Seven fishes 6. ~~Cavatelli / sausage~~ 7. Bucatini gricia 8. Italian beef T-bone 9. Fior di latte / caviar 10. Zeppole / cherry zabaione 11. To-go honey bun. Compared to Mikey's spaghetti, served in the first-season finale, "The food in the restaurant has become lighter and more delicate. The shift is not only emphasized by the menu choices but also by the way the food is handled and presented [...] [which parallels] the changes taking place concurrently in both the restaurant and the neighborhood, highlighting the underlying relationship between food" and gentrification.

Richie ably manages the dining room, looking after favorites like Claire and Kelly (Mitra Jouhari), Carol (Maura Kidwell) and major investor Cicero, and Syd's dad Emmanuel Adamu (Robert Townsend), whom he "dazzles" with the Bear Pop service, a bar cart stocked with "non-alcoholic options just for him." Less-favored patron Theodore Fak (Ricky Staffieri) is awarded a threatening headbutt. Claire and Kelly are seated at a four-person table the kitchen calls "PX table 31". PX is restaurant jargon for persone extraordinaire, meaning guests who should be given special attention. Carmy personally serves Claire and Kelly the welcome broth.

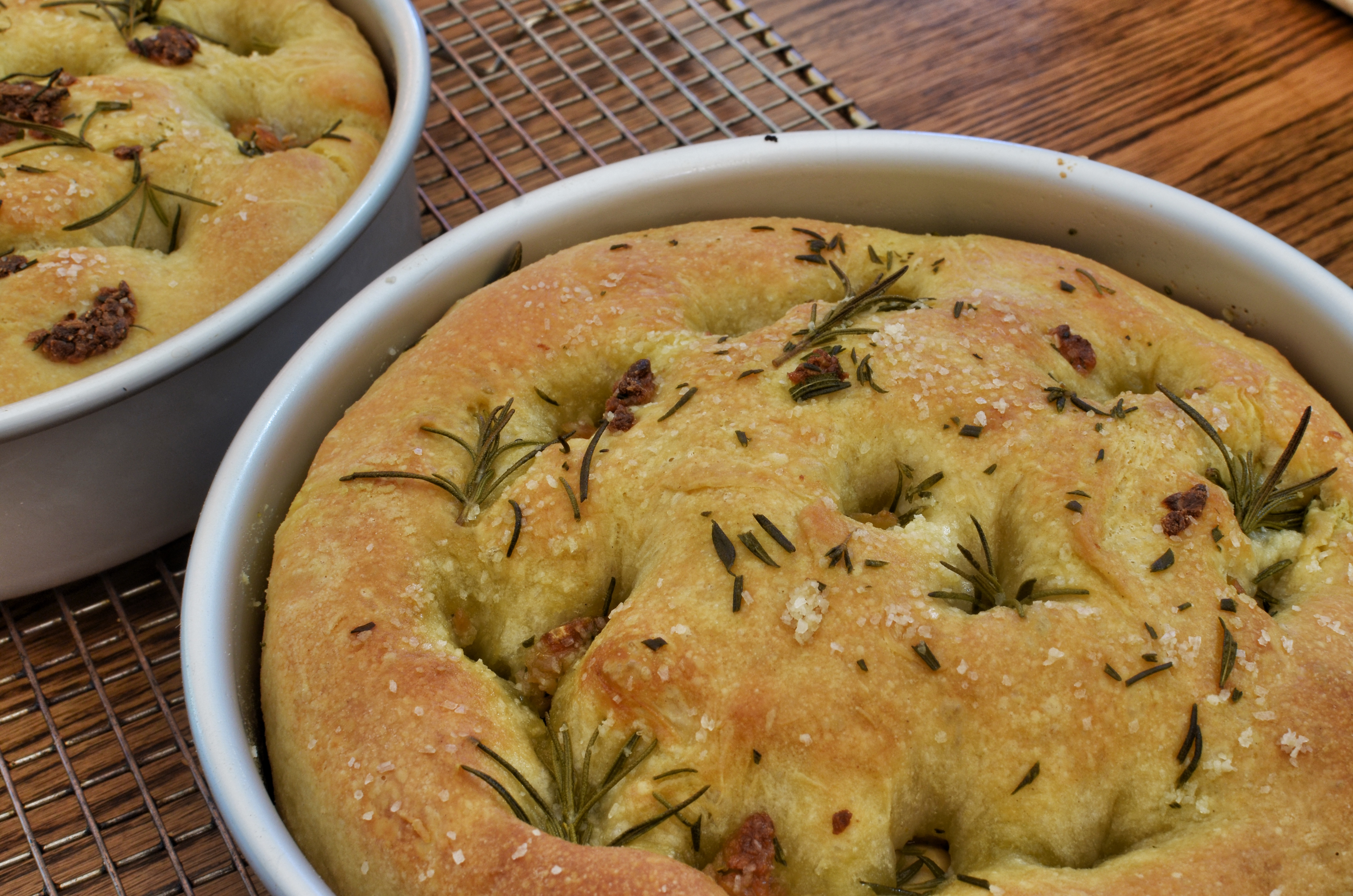
Focaccia is "hearth bread," from the Latin panis focacius, which shares a root with the word focus. Ancient focaccia was dough nested in hot ashes over stone.

The focaccia was baked by Mindy Segal. Marcus thinks Syd is ignoring him because she never responds to his requests for an "all day" for cannoli or focaccia. An "all day" is a count of the total number of current orders for a particular dish, including those pending for prep and those underway for service. According to culinary producer Storer, when Carmy freaks out that the fish "is dead," he means Sydney was "not expo-ing it fast enough, so it's getting cold. That throws the line cooks behind even more, because now they have to remake stuff" from scratch. Carmy, Sydney, and Tina all do the "I'm sorry" sign in the midst of the chaotic service. According to one study, "They start using this gesture to address conflicts efficiently. These cultural elements—new artifacts, words and signs—become integral to the team's dynamics, signalling a shift towards professionalization in the restaurant's operations. They also reflect chef Carm's efforts to move away from authoritarian practices often associated with high-end kitchens." Carmy's retreat to the walk-in is a tactical and strategic mise en place fail. He went to get some "grated Parmesan—one of the cooks ran out," but chefs should "not be running back and forth...it means chefs are not preparing before service."

The simplified seven fishes was designed by Kasama's Kwon and Flores, with a saffron fumé to accompany calamari, scallops, prawns, mussels, little clams, and amberjack. The Carabinero prawns (Aristaeopsis edwardsiana) were chosen because they are "red and really vibrant and kind of looked like the lobster in Seven Fishes." They first appeared in "Sheridan" as part of Syd's food brainstorming, and she also experimented with them at the top of "Forks." A savory reframing of the traditional dessert cannoli was Chris Storer's idea. Courtney Storer designed a pistachio-coated Parmesan-tuile shell filled with onion jam and mostarda (an Italian mustard-and-candied-cherries condiment). Jimmy gets a nostalgic chocolate-covered banana.

== Seasons 3 & 4: The Bear ==
Now open for business and subject to review, chef Carmen is hellbent on winning a Michelin star. He constantly experiments, doing what he describes as "R&D" (research and development), apparently without regard for potential consequences (although he is aware he is "jamming [them] up"). Chefs and restaurateurs interviewed by The New York Times and El País suggested that Carmy's change-the-menu-every-day plan is no good, in part because the constant changes drag down the speed and confidence of service. On the other hand, Richie's "dream weave," and the overall "level of intensity" at which Carmy and Syd operate "is probably shooting for two or three" stars. Richie remains ambivalent about fine dining: "Speaking for myself, I do not give a flying fuck into a rolling doughnut about the gastronomical proclivities of some dusty French tire marketing exec. I mean, I'm a Pirelli guy. I have been from way back. I would say that a Goodyear's probably a more practical choice for Chicago winters. But fucking Michelin...mangia cazzo [lit. 'eat a dick']." (Note: Michelin began producing rubber tires in 1889. The Michelin Guide began in 1920 as a travel guide to encourage more rubber-tired automobile driving trips.) Ebra opens the sandwich window, eventually with help from Beef vets Chuckie (Paulie James) and Chi-Chi. Over 50 dishes were created for season 4, including 10 wedding cakes for "Bears."

The restaurant has only some of the attributes that the chefs pitched to one another at the end of season 1. "Family style?" was the first thing Carmy said after finding the "life-changing sum" hidden by his brother. Family-style is a "service format in which food is placed in shared dishes for the table," but the Bear offers a flight of plated courses. They also dropped "tasting menu at the bar," but did pull off "two-tops, booths" and a Japanese-influenced version of "Danish design." The remodel yielded a dining room with minimalist furnishings in a variety of textures including a painted-plywood wall, wine bar, coatroom, espresso machine alcove, cruciform sconces, diffuse overhead lighting from spherical and asymmetric light fixtures, considerate details like purse hooks, and frosted glass to visually shelter both diners and staff. (Note: The remodel was a gut not a facelift, and the only elements retained from the Beef are the lockers, the walk-in fridge, and a butcher block.)

=== Carmy's blood orange hamachi ===
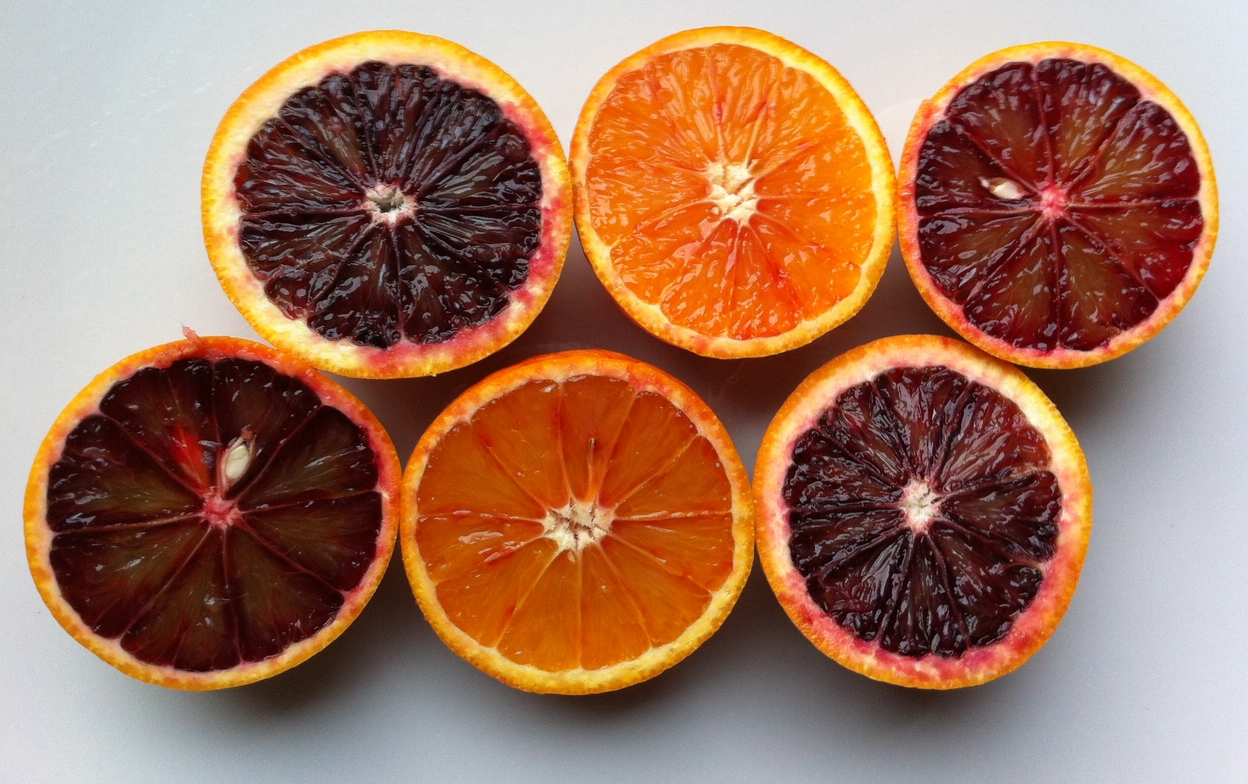
Blood oranges are primarily grown in California and the Mediterranean basin

A key element of the season 3 premiere "Tomorrow" is a flashback to Carmy at Empire in New York, creating a paupiette of hamachi with blood orange sauce that is served to Sydney, then a stranger. (Note: She may have also described it to Donna Berzatto in the wedding episode.) Paupiette is a form of fish cookery whereby a thin slice of fish is stuffed, rolled, tied up, and poached in stock. Hamachi (魬) is young farm-raised Japanese amberjack (Seriola quinqueradiata), expensive because of its "smooth, almost-melting mouthfeel." Carmy's first iteration of the dish used dill, which Chef Fields (McHale) rejected with the edict "never repeat ingredients," seemingly the model for Carmy's daily menu changes at the Bear. (Note: "No repetitions" is one of the rules of a Thomas Keller kitchen. At the French Laundry, the nine-course menu changes daily, and "No ingredient can be featured more than once on each night's menu, with the exception [...] of truffles, caviar, and foie gras.") Fields "rips into" Carmy for another version of this "pretty austere dish," saying "it's trash and quipping, 'You basically made nachos'."

Sydney was served a one-off in the Railway Exchange Building atrium, dressed as a restaurant dining room, on the pretext that she, the customer, had a fennel allergy. Syd has worked with several forms of fennel since joining the Beef, and thus almost certainly does not have such a sensitivity. White said in 2024, "You're connected forever, in some way, dining in these restaurants." In 2026, White said that Syd eating Carmy's food before they met had "inspired" her and created an "invisible tether" between them.

=== Noma Carmy ===
In flashbacks to the kitchens and gardens of the French Laundry in the northern California Wine Country and Noma restaurant in Copenhagen, Denmark, Carmy works in a greenhouse, and harvests baby turnips, purple peacock broccoli, and snap peas; B-roll highlights a chicken coop, honeybee hives, hollyhocks, snapdragons, and a Buddha's hand citron. He tastes dried rose petals, and with other trainees, he plucks the petals off umbelliform elderflower heads. He totes around scallops in their shells, and a cook demonstrates how to cut squid. At Noma, Carmy is dressed in the restaurant's "iconic" dark T-shirt and slate gray apron.

Food & Wine magazine commented that Carmy was likely "one of dozens of stages working there at the time." Critics have characterized Noma's use of stages as exploitative, and having to pay them may have been one reason the flagship restaurant closed its dining room in 2024. A food writer who staged at one of the many high-status restaurants that use the system, described it in The Guardian an "army" of "unpaid interns" charged with, mostly, washing "vegetables and picked herbs, mostly in silence. All kitchen work relies on a level of mundanity: most of cooking is cleaning, really, and there is beauty in that focus on, and reverence for, each task. Yet I was surprised at the number of stages, many of whom had opted to come from across Europe for a few weeks, out of their own pocket, and learned very little."

Noma is known in foodie world "for its experimental use of preservation methods and hyper-local grown and foraged ingredients," but it is repeatedly characterized by the Chicago Bears as a place where chefs make food "with ants" and "eat bugs." Sydney initially says "I would legit do anything to go to Noma," but in season 2 proposes sending Marcus there instead (which takes place in the episode "Honeydew"), and in Syd's telling, the pastry chef comes back "supercharged."

The cinematography of season 3 was influenced more by the Netflix show Chef's Table than by the claustrophobic submarine-warfare movies (Das Boot, Crimson Tide) that forged season 1. The editing of season 3, particularly the premiere, "Tomorrow," has been compared to that of Menus-Plaisirs – Les Troisgros (2023), a 240-minute French-language film directed the American documentarian Frederick Wiseman on Le Bois sans feuilles, a three-Michelin-star restaurant in Ouches, Loire, run by a multigenerational family of chefs.

=== The Bear menus, June–July 2023 ===
In "Tomorrow," after kicking the shit out of the bar cart for crimes unspecified, Carmy creates seven new dishes for the Bear, including a bouquet of sheeted, slow-roasted carrot, and red caviar (salmon roe), in a tart shell laid with a bed of carrot pureé, garnished with carrot greens and dill blossoms. The Waygu beef with the peas in their pods honors Carmy's "relationship with Chef Terry and [how he] loves her". He iterates the welcome broth into a mirepoix consommé that demands a fortune in brunoise-cut carrots, onion, and celery (technique, technique, technique). The pasta dish is a fragile but "sophisticated and sexy" raviolo al'uovo with pancetta dust. Carmy uses a plain wooden mold The Bear producers specifically commissioned to spotlight the "beautiful runny yolk" in its cradle. (Note: British home-cook food blogger on egg-yolk ravioli: "I won't lie to you—this is a horrendous parade of buggering about." Matty Matheson, in his 2020 cookbook: "This dish is perfect, and so are you.")

As depicted in "Doors," Carmy is running through all the mother sauces (including bordelaise and béarnaise). Carmy's very expensive "dystopian butter" from "Orwell, Vermont" is produced by Animal Farm Creamery. (Note: cf. Animal Farm by George Orwell; Animal Farm Creamery is technically located in Orwell-adjacent Shoreham.) Rib cap is another cut of beef. Other dishes served in June and July include duck with apricot, beef tenderloin with cherry jus, pear and brie, spring onion, spaghettata, venison, rabbit, tomato sorbetto, and something with edible flowers (nasturtium leaves and violets). One of the more esoteric ingredients is bottarga, a "dried roe sac." In "Violet," Syd and Carmy squabble about habanero versus scotch bonnet for a dish that otherwise includes allspice and suprêmed grapefruit.

=== The Bear menus, August 2023 ===
As the summer progresses, the menu changes appear to be grinding down even Carmy. In "Children," he works on something garnished with a baby turnip or white radish. Syd is underwhelmed by the sauce, which she finds "like 2014 or something". She shares that her dad gets the same thing every time he goes to a steakhouse, drawing a contrast between a mint reduction and a mint geleé, which seems to help clarify Carmy's thinking. They agree to serve gnocchi with beef cheeks that day.

Los Angeles Times TV critic Robert Lloyd commended the cinematographer's "attitude of tenderness" in depicting Carmy's exhaustion in "Legacy," shooting "extra close, hanging at length on an actor's face, letting us linger over freckles and lines and scars, blood vessels in a tired eye." The menu talk later in the episode illustrates Sydney's disenchantment with her creative partner's apparent "inability to, y'know, partner with her creatively" (or even make eye contact). In the words of one recapper, "He's an open book to Marcus, but he shuts down her menu ideas without even saying, 'Sorry, nice try.' Carmy is determined to run the whole show, and the guy is going full unhinged." In "Apologies," Carmy worries over another dish. Whether or not he is aware of it, Sydney plays the role of his artistic muse and model. According to one writer, "For Carmy, food is not only an art form, but his love language, [and] subconsciously or not, he draws inspiration from Syd." The white speckles in the purple sauce on Carmy's plate "distinctly resemble Syd's polka-dot headscarf." After Sydney says good night, he chucks the whole works in the dish bin. In the words of Americana UK, "I would eat that duck out of the trash, as long as it was on top. Period. It looks incredible."

=== The Bear menus, September–October 2023 ===
Carmy creates what Syd calls a "delicious soubise," a creamy white onion sauce, to go with their Wagyu beef dish. (Storer's recipe uses red torpedo onions like cipolla rossa di Tropea Calabria, white wine, sherry vinegar, crème fraîche, and rosemary.) As summer turns to fall, there is an ever-expanding album of Bear-food photographs with black-Sharpie annotations green-taped to the office walls, including a soft-cooked quail egg in a nest of asparagus mandolined-crosswise and fanned into a green rosette built on a frame of confit potato and black garlic; pan-roasted halibut with lemon oil and tartar espuma; hiramasa ceviche with a lime-based leche de tigre dressing; hamachi with grapefruit pearls, coconut, and lemon ice; puréed soup of butternut squash and spiced peppers; nettle raviolo with Pistacchio verde di Bronte, pistachio espuma, and coriander blossom; and a raviolo with peas and Parmesan mousse (this last courtesy Bear culinary producer Lockwood). Come autumn, Carmy is suddenly amenable to repeating dishes. In "Green," at long last, Carmy and Sydney lock the menu, with "Nine courses. All hits."

=== The Beef's hospitality ===
In the "Napkins" flashback, when Tina first visits the Beef (while waiting for her CTA bus home from a fruitless job interview), the boys feed and shelter her with "humanity and compassion." Richie does not charge her for a black coffee. Chi-Chi deems her worthy of a free sandwich another customer did not pick up under the expected time and behavior parameters. Michael offers Tina a sympathetic ear, if she wants one. They talk, and they chuckle at Michael's brother's unrecognizable culinary creation. (Note: Carmy sent Mikey a photograph of a Noma dish of trout roe and "beach herbs" (purslane tips, beach cress blossoms, chickweed).) Eventually, they agree that an artisanal approach to work, in food service or any industry, is a luxury neither can afford.

=== Sydney's hospitality ===
Sydney brings food to postpartum Natalie and partner Pete: ragù alla bolognese and noodles, beef stew, minestrone soup, and a lasagna. In season 5, Pete visits the Bear and agrees to do dirty work for Syd if she promises to make him more of her bolognese.

At the end of "Forever," Sydney hosts a potluck after-party at her new apartment. Carmy is absent but his business partner and his culinary mentor chef up freezer waffles and frozen pizza for their friends and coworkers. The oven-baked waffles are topped with crème fraîche and caviar, from what appears to be a US$2,000 canister of Beluga sturgeon caviar (presumably brought from Ever or given to Terry as a valedictory gift).

=== Ever funeral dinner ===
The Chicago restaurant Alinea is famous in fine-dining circles for its "theatrical" "maximalist" "modernist" cuisine (generally known as molecular gastronomy). One Italian doctoral candidate wondered what the general audience, uninitiated into the mysteries, made of Achatz and Luca's (Will Poulter) talk about needles and balloons at the Ever funeral, and suggested that the show periodically broadcasts in "codes" and "coordinates" that are not universally readable.

=== Sydney's scallop ===
"Scallop" opens with a kaleidoscopic sequence of Sydney preparing lightly seared scallops with an orange-ginger compound butter, a prospective dish for the restaurant's reduced-components menu. Tasting Table noted that the final dish "is largely obscured by some kind of pale foam." After one bite, Carm declares it "perfect" and "better than perfect," and tells her to "put it up."

Syd's cook is "colorfully illuminated by a shifting array of vibrant blues, pinks, and purples, a combination sometimes dubbed 'bisexual lighting'." Another writer suggested that the color indicates viewpoint: "When the dish is plated, the shot shifts to a first-person point of view [...] It illustrates how Carmy perceives Syd in an otherworldly manner when she's in the kitchen doing what she loves." Wehde told British Cinematographer, "If there's a color wash you know something is going on because we never do them except in very specific moments."

=== Sydney's beef bowl for T.J. ===
The main dish prepared in "Worms" is elevated cheeseburger macaroni Hamburger Helper. Hamburger Helper is a brand of boxed meal kit containing dried pasta and a spice mix, meant to be combined with ground beef, popularized in the inflationary 1970s. Ground beef is comparatively affordable because it is usually "trimmings of the less-expensive cuts such as brisket and shank." Episode co-writer Boyce explained that beef stroganoff or mac and cheese Hamburger Helper was his preferred "instant-comfort nostalgia food." According to Edebiri, "Sydney's canonically bad with kids," but she connects with T.J. (Arion King) while constructing this dish. The inclusion of Hamburger Helper was not a paid product placement. According to Today's food reporter Joseph Lamour, like previous memorable Bear dishes, the bowl "combines haute cuisine with accessible ingredients." Syd and T.J. replace some of the milk with heavy cream "for a richer sauce," and add tomato paste, diced yellow onion, shredded cheese (probably white cheddar or mozzarella), and toasted panko. Sydney's cousin Chantel (Danielle Deadwyler) wanted hot sauce on hers.

=== Italian hospitality ===
In "Tonnato," Donna recalls that while vacationing in Italy, a stranger served her espresso and a dish of roasted red peppers with a "disgusting," delicious sauce Carmy identifies as tonnato. Tonnato dishes, such as vitello tonnato, feature tuna. "Tuna sauce," most commonly found in northern Italian Piedmontese cuisine, is often served with cooked vegetables. Donna is presumably describing peperoni tonnati.

=== Thomas Keller's roast chicken ===
Carmy makes Donna roasted whole chicken for lunch, which he learned at the French Laundry at the beginning of his career. This dish requires minimal culinary technique. Key steps are patting the bird dry, and trussing. In "Violet," Carmy teaches Tina how to truss poultry, in which the bird's legs and wings are tied close to the body using twine, and "the pope's nose" is a key landmark in the binding. The show did not depict Carmy's process, just the final plate.

== Season 5: Final service ==
The dinner menu served at the Bear the night of October 4, 2023, is focaccia with tomato-infused oil and whipped lardo topped with tomato powder; prawn with celery root, peach, and champagne; agnolotti in a white wine and elderflower beurre monte; California lettuces; Carmy and Luca's lamb with Carmy's tonnato; Carmy's "Forever peas" plate, inspired by "his sensei" Chef Terry; Tina's fried Brussels sprouts with onion, mint, and smoked horseradish sauce; and Syd's Coca-Cola short ribs with polenta by Sugar. Sydney says the lamb tonnato is the second-best dish she has had "in a long time," the first-best being a grapefruit scallop dish served at Empire restaurant. While browsing Carmy's journals, Donna flips past previously unseen recipes, including a scallop dish with red and orange accents. Carmy's food illustrations are drawn by Chicago artist Denise Dietz. In need of a short-notice surprise, Carmy pulls together a pair of smoked-salmon cornets, based on a famous Keller dish, which Richie recognizes from the French Laundry Cookbook.

The Bear, the fictional restaurant on The Bear, was awarded two Michelin stars

Based on the service at night of "Scallop," the restaurant earned two Michelin stars for exceptional, creative food, and a dining room that "felt alive without being precious or tryhard." Michelin stars guarantee nothing, but under ideal circumstances are good marketing, help legitimize restaurants to the public, increase patronage by European tourists, and allow for substantial price increases. Two tracks on the season 5 original score are named for foods: "Honey," which plays when Syd visits the dining room during service, and "Caviar," which plays during the embrace.

In the series finale, Carmy signs off on plans made by Ebra, Albert Schnur (Rob Reiner), Computer (Brian Koppelman), Chi-Chi, Chuckie, and Cheese (Elsie Fisher) to establish TOBOC sandwich windows at locations other than Huron and Orleans, supported by a central "ghost kitchen," allowing the Berzattos to capitalize further on the enduring appeal of an "iconic" sandwich. Back in episode 2, Jimmy told Carmy that Mikey had just such an idea. After texting Mikey one last time, Carmy gazes up at the gallery of Bear dishes, to which has lately been added a red-beet rye-flour tart garnished with baby zucchini blossoms and baby oregano flowers; bass en papillote served with turnip and carrots tourné over a carrot glaze; something with dried coconut, plum jam, and plum powder; something with a verjus fumet, julienned turnips and sweet potato chips; cherries preserved in port with a cherry gastrique (with the note "this dish contains alcohol"); clams with 'nduja and white wine sauce; pommes soufflé with truffle and Tête de Moines crème; and a dish that incorporates pickled mustardseed garnished with yellow flower petals. One literature professor argued that "the show's power lies precisely in how it stages Chicago as a city of contrasts...Fine dining, often associated with exclusivity and cosmopolitan prestige, is here built upon the labor, loyalty, and resilience of a diverse working‑class team...the series foregrounds the friction between aspiration and rootedness. The Bear acknowledges the city's global reputation while insisting on the value of its neighborhood cultures and working‑class ethos."

== See also ==
- Sweeps (The Bear) § Pairings
- Music of The Bear
- Family on The Bear
- List of The Bear episodes
- List of The Bear characters

== Sources ==
- Chagollan, Steve (March–April 2023). "No Substitutions: For the makers of The Bear, there was never any question that Chicago would play itself. Practical locations were key, and the beauty is in the details" (PDF). Produced By. Los Angeles, California: Producers Guild of America. pp. 44–51.
- D'Acierno, Pellegrino, ed. (1999). The Italian American Heritage: A Companion to Literature and Arts. Garland reference library of the humanities no. 1473. New York: Garland. ISBN 978-0-8153-0380-0. LCCN 98-7963. OCLC 39108561.
- Di Giovine, Michael A. (November 2010). "La Vigilia Italo-Americana: Revitalizing the Italian-American Family Through the Christmas Eve 'Feast of the Seven Fishes'". Food and Foodways. 18 (4): 181–208. doi:10.1080/07409710.2010.529012. ISSN 0740-9710.
- Fallon, Jordan (2026). "'Every Second Counts' The Bear's Culinary Musicality and Confused Temporality". In Niewiadomska-Flis, Urszula; Tippen, Carrie Helms (eds.). Food and American TV: Constructing Identity in Bite-Sized Narratives. Routledge Food Studies. London: Routledge. pp. 137–152. doi:10.4324/9781003672173. ISBN 978-1-041-13920-1. LCCN 2025053137. OCLC 1578998345.
- Fisher, Mary Frances Kennedy (2004). The Art of Eating: 50th Anniversary Edition. Houghton Mifflin Harcourt. ISBN 978-0-544-17743-7. LCCN 2003026124. OCLC 880401893.
- Franklin-Phipps, Asilia; Varga, Bretton A. (Fall 2024). "Bear(ing) Down: Encountering Posthuman Critical Media Studies through the (Re)tracing of Object and Embodiment". Journal of Posthumanism. 4 (3). Penn State University Press: 205–216. doi:10.33182/joph.v4i3.3290. ISSN 2634-3584.
- Haddix, Carol Mighton; Kraig, Bruce; Sen, Colleen Taylor, eds. (2017). The Chicago Food Encyclopedia. Heartland Foodways. Urbana: The University of Illinois Press. ISBN 978-0-252-09977-9. LCCN 2017007883. OCLC 973222701. Project MUSE book 55651.
- Hazan, Marcella (2022) [1973]. Essentials of Classic Italian Cooking (ebook ed.). New York: Alfred A. Knopf. ISBN 978-0-593-53432-8. LCCN 2021053201. OCLC 1285370433.
- Herbst, Sharon Tyler; Herbst, Ron (2013). The New Food Lover's Companion (5th ed.). Naperville, Illinois: Barron's Educational Series. ISBN 978-1-4380-9233-1. LCCN 2013008951. OCLC 838195883.
- Keller, Thomas; Cerciello, Jeff; Heller, Susie; Ruhlman, Michael (2004). Bouchon. Photographs by Deborah Jones. New York: Artisan. ISBN 978-1-57965-239-5. LCCN 2004051998. OCLC 55644681.
- Kindelsperger, Nick (July 29, 2020). "20 Best Italian Beefs". Section 5: Health & Lifestyle. Chicago Tribune (Part 1 of 2). Chicago, Illinois. p. 1. ISSN 1085-6706. OCLC 7960243. & "Beef". Chicago Tribune (Part 2 of 2). July 29, 2020. p. 11 – via Newspapers.com.
- Maisonet, Illyanna (2022). Diasporican: A Puerto Rican Cookbook. New York: Ten Speed Press. ISBN 978-1-9848-5976-1. LCCN 2021060873. OCLC 1290721858.
- McGonagle, Elizabeth (December 15, 2025). A Case Study of The Bear: Gender, Identity, and Culture in the Modern American Restaurant (M.A. Modern Art, Literature and Culture). Lisbon, Portugal: Universidade de Lisboa. hdl:10400.5/117105.
- Martynuska, Małgorzata (February 2026). "'Every Second Counts': Representing Chicago's Urban Identity in the TV Series The Bear". Perspektywy Kultury. 53 (2). Kraków: Ignatianum University in Cracow: 75–91. ISSN 2081-1446.
- Nikolova, Zlatina (July 2025). "'Every second counts': Urban affect and culinary chaos in The Bear". The Journal of Popular Television. 13 (1): 43–59. doi:10.1386/jptv_00135_1. ISSN 2046-9861.
- Opazo, M. Pilar (January 2025). "Media Review: Cooking Up Organizational Change at The Bear". Organization Studies. 46 (1). European Group for Organizational Studies (EGOS), Sage Journals: 149–152. doi:10.1177/01708406241273789. ISSN 0170-8406.
- Patel, Eboo; Olson, Rollie (2026). "The Bear, Tocqueville, and Institutions That Work". Democracy's Challenges: 100 Ideas. Democratic Resilience. NYU Press. pp. 409–411. ISBN 9781479852536. JSTOR jj.45475155.107. LCCN 2026947197.
- Singer, Christoph (2026). "The chef and the city: Mobile masculinities in Chef and The Bear". Journal of Urban Cultural Studies. 13 (1): 119–132. doi:10.1386/jucs_00114_1. ISSN 2050-9790.
- Vi, Kieu Jenny (Summer 2025). "Cooking Up Change: Food and Gentrification in The Bear (2022—)". In Progress: A Graduate Journal of North American Studies. 3 (1). Technische Informationsbibliothek (TIB). Hanover, Germany: Leibniz Universität Hannover: 105–119. doi:10.15488/19952.
