= Suqaar =

Somalian dish

Suqaar (Arabic: صغار) is a seasoned meat and vegetable dish popular in Somalia and diaspora communities. According to chef Ifrah F. Ahmed, the core ingredients in hilib suqaar are finely chopped meat, xawaash seasoning, and peppers. The meat can be camel, chicken, lamb, beef, etc. Chicken suqaar is called suqaar digaag.

Suqaar pairs well with a flatbread (for instance, muufo) or rice.

Basbaas cagaar, a green hot sauce, is another common accompaniment.
