= Claire Bear =

Claire Bear may refer to:

- Claire Bennet, a character on the American TV series Heroes
- Claire Dunlap, a character on the American TV series The Bear
