= Pop (The Bear) =

- The Bear episode
- Episode no.: Season 2 Episode 5
- Directed by: Joanna Calo
- Written by: Sofya Levitsky-Weitz
- Cinematography by: Andrew Wehde
- Editing by: Adam Epstein
- Production code: XCBV2005
- Original release date: June 22, 2023
- Running time: 33 minutes

Guest appearances
- Oliver Platt as Jimmy "Cicero" Kalinowski; Edwin Lee Gibson as Ebraheim; Molly Gordon as Claire; Corey Hendrix as Gary "Sweeps" Woods; Mitra Jouhari as Kelly; Nate Varrone as Tim Drywall Guy; Danny Catlow as Alex; Jack Bensinger as partygoer no. 1; Eric Rahill as partygoer no. 2; James Swanberg as Kyle; Jack Bronis as Richie's electrician; Michael Salzinski as instructor; Demetra Dee as student no. 1; April Lichtman as student no. 2; Alfred H. Wilson as new plumber; Michael B. Woods as new electrician

Episode chronology
← Previous "Honeydew"	Next → "Fishes"
- The Bear season 2

"Pop" is the fifth episode of the second season of the American television comedy-drama The Bear. It is the 13th overall episode of the series and was written by Sofya Levitsky-Weitz, and directed by executive producer Joanna Calo. It was released on Hulu on June 22, 2023, along with the rest of the season.

The series follows Carmen "Carmy" Berzatto, an award-winning New York City chef de cuisine, who returns to his hometown of Chicago to run his late brother Michael's failing Italian beef sandwich shop. In the episode, Carmy decides to accompany Claire to a party, while The Bear undergoes more reparation plans.

The episode received highly positive reviews from critics, who praised the writing, performances and character development. Liza Colón-Zayas won the Primetime Emmy Award for Outstanding Supporting Actress in a Comedy Series for her performance in the episode.

== Plot ==
Sydney (Ayo Edebiri) and Tina (Liza Colón-Zayas) continue developing the menu. While Tina is improving at culinary school and bonding with her younger classmates, she is worried when Ebraheim (Edwin Lee Gibson) starts skipping classes and cannot get through to him. With 6 weeks before opening, the restaurant continues facing more problems, as the contractors are waiting for others to finish so they can properly start working.

Cicero (Oliver Platt) visits The Bear, and is aghast at the decaying state. Despite already going over-budget, Natalie (Abby Elliott) convinces him in lending a further $50,000 for the repairs and permits. Carmy (Jeremy Allen White) leaves to mail a liquor license application in Winnetka, with Claire (Molly Gordon) agreeing to drive him there.

Afterwards, she convinces him in accompanying her to a friend's party. Carmy feels nervous as he never went to a townie party before, but ends up having fun with Claire's friends. Apologizing for giving her a fake phone number, Carmy decides to make up by showing her the restaurant. They arrive at The Bear, where Richie (Ebon Moss-Bachrach) has been scolded for trying to steal electricity from the neighbors. After introducing them to Claire, they all leave them alone so Carmy can show the kitchen. After Fak (Matty Matheson) interrupts their meeting, Carmy forces him to leave. He returns with Claire, and they share their first kiss.

== Production ==
=== Development ===
In May 2023, Hulu confirmed that the fifth episode of the season would be titled "Pop", and was to be written by Sofya Levitsky-Weitz, and directed by executive producer Joanna Calo. It was Levitsky-Weitz's second writing credit, and Calo's fifth directing credit.

=== Filming ===
Episode director Joanna Calo prepped for the shoot by watching Chicago-centric teen films like Sixteen Candles and Risky Business. Calo told NJ.com she thought in terms of "a gorgeous close-up with some glowy light is just very classic romantic comedy, which is what I was really trying to reference," and intentionally framed Claire with "a cutout in the wall, signifying a shift in focus for the chef."

Executive producer Storer told an interviewer, "Episode five, which Joanna [Calo] directed beautifully, that's one of my favorite episodes of the season. They're at a weird high school reunion party, and it feels childlike. It's like Carmy is 15 again. And I feel like because he started this mission of becoming a chef at such a young age, he missed out on a lot of his life and almost stopped developing. And for Tina, she's with a new group of friends and scared, and there was something so gorgeous about her singing that random song in the bar."

=== Sound design ===
To create a nightmarish, repetitive, claustrophobic sound for the episode's opening scene, composers Jeffrey Qaiyum and Johnny Iguana recorded and then layered and looped chopping sounds, scraping utensils, and clinking wine glasses in Qaiyum's home kitchen. Qaiyum described this as "a really fun session because I could bring the mics up to the kitchen and record. So we chopped different vegetables and different fruits, because you get a different sound, different cutting boards. We did the really close mic-ing of the stove lighting. You hear that in the background."

=== Music ===
The songs used on the soundtrack of this episode included "Bastards of Young" by The Replacements, "Total Control" by The Motels, "Anytime" by Neil Finn, "Pretty in Pink" by The Psychedelic Furs, "Tonight, Tonight" by The Smashing Pumpkins, "Before the Next Teardrop Falls" by Freddy Fender, "Here Comes the Night" by Van Morrison, "Strange Currencies" by R.E.M., and "Can't Hardly Wait" by The Replacements.

== Reception ==
=== Critical reviews ===
"Pop" received highly positive reviews from critics. Marah Eakin of Vulture gave the episode a 4 star out of 5 rating and wrote, "After he takes his leave, Carmy and Claire finally kiss as the Replacements' 'Can’t Hardly Wait' swells. It's a perfectly romantic moment, and one The Bear plays off with sweetness and maybe just a touch of 'kissing in an empty shell of a restaurant' sexiness. Yes, Chef, indeed."

A. J. Daulerio of Decider wrote, "Sydney introduces herself to Claire and attempts to talk Chaos Menu with Carmy but quickly exits when it's clear he's more interested in swanning Claire around the dilapidated fire hazard, The Bear. Once everyone finally leaves, Carmy and Claire make it all official." Arnav Srivastava of The Review Geek gave the episode a 4.5 star rating out of 5 and wrote, "That element of tension hasn't surfaced yet. But it is a continuing source of excitement for us when it does. Season 2 has followed the established formula from the first season with a little more time away from the restaurant." Karl R De Mesa from Show Snob wrote, "What a rare, feel-good episode in a, so far, very high stress season."

Rafa Boladeras of MovieWeb named the episode as the ninth best of the season, writing "'Pop' is a transitional episode of the show, as most of the stories of the season keep going along. [...] This is also the episode where we see Carmy and Claire on an almost-Before Sunrise date, as they start to get to know each other better, reveal more intimate details about themselves, and even go to a party (something the chef has never done before)." Jasmine Blu of TV Fanatic named the episode as the weakest of the season, writing "The second season of The Bear didn't have any misses, but the least interesting installment of the season probably goes to the midseason episode, 'Pop.'"

=== Accolades ===
Award	Category	Nominee	Result	Ref.
Primetime Emmy Awards	Outstanding Supporting Actress in a Comedy Series	Liza Colón-Zayas	Won	

=== Retrospective reviews ===
In 2024, The Hollywood Reporter placed "Pop" at 27 on a ranked list of 28 episodes produced to that point, commenting that it is "a perfect illustration of why The Bear is among the best shows around right now; the lowest-rated truly is better than the highest-rated of most other active series." Screen Rant ranked "Pop" 16th out of the 28 episodes produced through the end of season three, describing it as a more restful episode and commending Tina's unexpected karaoke triumph as a highlight.

In 2025, Vulture ranked "Pop," which it described as being primarily about the "burgeoning love story" between Carmy and Claire, as 28th-best out of 38 episodes of The Bear.
