= Omelette (The Bear) =

- The Bear episode
- Episode no.: Season 2 Episode 9
- Directed by: Christopher Storer
- Written by: Joanna Calo; Christopher Storer
- Cinematography by: Andrew Wehde
- Editing by: Adam Epstein
- Production code: XCBV2009
- Original release date: June 22, 2023
- Running time: 38 minutes

Guest appearances
- Oliver Platt as Jimmy "Cicero" Kalinowski; Edwin Lee Gibson as Ebraheim; Molly Gordon as Claire; Robert Townsend as Emmanuel Adamu; Corey Hendrix as Gary "Sweeps" Woods; José Cervantes as Angel; Richard Esteras as Manny; Carmen Christopher as Chester; Ricky Staffieri as Theodore "Teddy" Fak; Lance Baker as examiner; Alex Moffat as Josh; Isa Arciniegas as Daniela; Jack Lancaster as Connor

Episode chronology
← Previous "Bolognese"	Next → "The Bear"
- The Bear season 2

"Omelette" is the ninth episode of the second season of the American television comedy-drama series The Bear. It is the 17th overall episode of the series and was written by executive producer Joanna Calo and series creator Christopher Storer, and directed by Storer. It was released on Hulu on June 22, 2023, along with the rest of the season.

The series follows Carmen "Carmy" Berzatto, an award-winning New York City chef de cuisine, who returns to his hometown of Chicago to run his late brother Michael's failing Italian beef sandwich shop. In the episode, the staff prepares for the soft opening of The Bear, while Cicero gives some advice to Carmy over his priorities.

The episode received critical acclaim, with critics praising the calmed nature of the episode, character development and pacing.

== Plot ==
The Bear is set for its soft opening, for family and friends only. As Carmy (Jeremy Allen White) hopes Claire (Molly Gordon) will show up, Sydney (Ayo Edebiri) is hoping to impress her father, Emmanuel (Robert Townsend) and prove she chose the right career for herself.

Natalie (Abby Elliott) surprises Carmy by revealing she invited their mother for the opening, and Carmy reluctantly supports the decision. Richie (Ebon Moss-Bachrach) gets Fak (Matty Matheson) and Gary (Corey Hendrix) to work in front of the restaurant to help him, and also talks with Natalie over having to increase reservations despite a fully booked two weeks in order to reach profitability. As the staff prepares for the final stages, Cicero (Oliver Platt) pays a visit to talk with Carmy. He provides him with his business license, but warns him about prioritizing the restaurant's best interests. He compares it to the Steve Bartman incident, feeling that a single mistake could potentially lead to other disastrous events. As such, Carmy chooses to ignore Claire's phone call prior to the opening, so she leaves a voice message instead.

As Carmy and Sydney try to accommodate a table, Carmy apologizes for his behavior, and promises to be more cooperative with her in their plans. He also surprises her by giving her a custom chef's coat. With just a minutes away, Carmy has forgotten to have the handle of the walk-in refrigerator replaced, but is focused in getting everything ready. With Carmy, Richie and Natalie in the reception, Sydney proclaims "let it rip", and Richie opens the door to the customers.

== Production ==
=== Development ===
In May 2023, Hulu confirmed that the ninth episode of the season would be titled "Omelette", and was to be written by executive producer Joanna Calo and series creator Christopher Storer, and directed by Storer. It was Calo's fifth writing credit, Storer's seventh writing credit, and Storer's eleventh directing credit.

=== Filming ===
The scene between Sydney and Emmanuel Adamu in "Omelette" was the first scene that Ayo Edebiri and Robert Townsend filmed together. Edebiri, who told creator Storer that Townsend was her dream casting to play Sydney's dad, said, "I remember being nervous and then him showing up and being like, 'Let's play.' He wanted to be an actor and he was so game and humble in that way."

=== Costuming ===
Carmy gave Sydney chef whites embroidered with her initials as a gift before the restaurant opening. Designer Thom Browne confirmed via Instagram that the whites were a custom design. According to costume designer Courtney Wheeler, it took four to six months to create the chef whites, and "I'm so glad that they were able to do that. It's so fitting for Sydney. It's such a great gift and kind of shows that Carmy is believing in her, and so it connects their relationship. But also just for the show, for Chris, it's such a full circle moment."

Taking after mentor Richie, Neil Fak also starts wearing suits. Matty Matheson's personal tailor Harry Rosen created a retro-styled brown suit and pink-striped shirt combo that costume designer Courtney Wheeler thought was intended to suggest a vintage JCPenney or Sears suit that Neil had borrowed from his dad's closet. Wheeler added a vintage embroidered tie purchased at Richard's Fabulous Finds in Chicago.

=== Music ===
The songs used in "Omelette" are "The Day the World Went Away" by Nine Inch Nails, "Strange Currencies" by R.E.M., "New Noise" by Refused, "Come Back" by Pearl Jam, and "If You Want Blood (You've Got It)" by AC/DC. "Strange Currencies (Remix)" from 2019 and "If You Want Blood" were also used in the official trailer for season two.

== Reception ==
=== Critical reviews ===
"Omelette" received critical acclaim. Marah Eakin of Vulture gave the episode a perfect 5 star out of 5 rating and wrote, "The Bear has always been about personal development and clearing out all the mess left over from years of neglect, be it greasy oven hoods or childhood trauma. Perhaps The Bear's future lies not just in further excavation of that idea but also in figuring out how to use those old bricks to build something new, whether it's functional adulthood, a thriving career, or a successful relationship."

A.J. Daulerio of Decider wrote, "I guess Nat decided that Richie was the best option to captain the front of the house. I love the transformation, but this guy was stealing electricity a month ago. They should let him bus tables for a few nights first." Arnav Srivastava of The Review Geek gave the episode a 4 star rating out of 5 and wrote, "The final stepping stone to the finale was all about the little details. This episode really gave viewers an opportunity to critique the characters and their decisions, such as what may be behind Carmen's inclinations." Karl R De Mesa from Show Snob wrote, "Carmy brings out a gift for her. It's a new chef's whites double-breasted jacket with her initials on them. The rest of the episode is a beautiful cut-to-cut of the prep chaos and will that goes on behind every kitchen five minutes to opening. What an appetizer for the season finale."

Rafa Boladeras of MovieWeb named the episode as the sixth best of the season, writing "the most important moment in the whole episode is the conversation between Carmy and Sydney under the table, about how they're a team, and they wouldn't want to do this without the other. This talk is as emotionally open and sincere as they come, or at least for two people who aren't a couple, just friends and co-workers. Also, an omelette on TV has never looked as delicious as the one Sydney cooks for Natalie." Jasmine Blu of TV Fanatic named the episode as the sixth best of the season, writing "The penultimate episode of the season perfectly set things up for the intense finale as it subtly put the spotlight on some key aspects of what would arise. Carmy missing the call from the Fridge guy and routinely being distracted, for example."

=== Accolades ===
Award	Category	Nominee(s)	Result	Ref.
Art Directors Guild Awards	Excellence in Production Design for a Half Hour Single-Camera Television Series	Merje Veski	Nominated	
Primetime Creative Arts Emmy Awards	Outstanding Production Design for a Narrative Program (Half-Hour)	Eric Frankel, Lisa Korpan, and Merje Veski	Nominated	
