= Potash Market =

Chicago grocery stores

Potash Market is a family-owned chain of specialty grocery stores in Chicago, Illinois, United States.

== History ==
David Potash, Melvin Potash, and Herbert Potash, Marian Potash, and their father Max Potash, a Russian immigrant, founded the first of the family's series of grocery stores in 1950. There were nine children born to Sarah Goldstein and Max Potashnick, "who shortened the family name to Potash after settling in the United States," six girls and three boys. Marian Potash Schuman worked in the stores for 60 years.

The first location, originally called Plee-Zing Foods, was located at Clark Street and Schiller. The Clark Street location was relocated in 1961 to make way for Sandburg Village. An expansion was going to relocate it again but Melvin Potash and Dave Potash made a deal with the developer to open Sandburg Supermart in 1967. There was another Plee-Zing Market run by Melvin and David Potash on North Avenue.

Herbert Potash opened Potash Brothers Food and Liquor on State Street in 1962. Melvin Potash's son Art Potash joined the business and restructured, at which time the State Street market and the Sandburg Village market were rebranded as "Potash Market." Melvin Potash's son Mark Potash became a sportswriter for the Chicago Sun-Times.

A third location on Delaware Street opened in 2008. The location on Lawrence Avenue closed in 1992. There was Lincoln Square location of Potash that closed in the early 1990s.

Herbert Potash died in 2005. David Potash died in 2014. Melvin Potash died in 2021. The stores are now managed by Art Potash and Max Potash. As of 2021 the chain had locations at 875 N. State St. and 1525 N. Clark St., along with Potash Gourmet 44 on the 44th floor of the John Hancock Center. The Clark Street and State Street locations are both in what is called the Gold Coast neighborhood.

== In popular culture ==
A receipt from Potash Market is visible in Carmy's (Jeremy Allen White) apartment in the first episode of season 2 of The Bear TV series (2022–2026). The scene where Carmy runs into Claire (Molly Gordon) was filmed at Potash on State Street.
