= Luca (The Bear) =

Fictional character, The Bear TV series

- Will Poulter as Luca
- First appearance: "Honeydew"; June 22, 2023
- Last appearance: "The Original Beef of Chicagoland"; June 25, 2026
- Created by: Christopher Storer; Stacy Osei-Kuffour
- Portrayed by: Will Poulter

In-universe information
- Occupation: chef; pastry chef

Chef Luca is a fictional character on the FX Network television series The Bear. Played by Will Poulter, Luca is a highly trained British chef who comes to Chicago to work and support his sister. The character, and Poulter's performance, have been well received, with Poulter receiving a nomination for the Primetime Emmy Award for Outstanding Guest Actor in a Comedy Series for his work on the second season.

== Casting ==
Poulter was a fan of season one of the series, and said "I basically asked to meet Chris [Storer], and I begged him to be in it." Poulter trained to play a chef by staging with Dave Beran at Pasjoli in Santa Monica, California. Jeremy Allen White, who plays Carmy Berzatto, staged at the same restaurant prior to season one. When talking about his training, he described the embarrassment of accidentally strewing meringue all over the kitchen, and having a sauce maltaise break after the physical labor of whisking it together in the first place. The producers also set him up with training at three London restaurants: "I worked at Black Axe Mangal, St. JOHN, and then I did half a shift at Trullo."

Interviewed about his career in April 2025, Poulter said, "I love that show so much. The fact I get to be in it is crazy. When I'm on that set, I'm like, 'Oh, they've let a fan on set.' I literally feel like a competition winner."

== Biography ==
Luca is a "handsome, tattooed" professional chef with special skills in pastry. Carmy and Luca's tattoos were designed by the same tattoo artist, Benny Shields. He is similar to Carmy Berzatto (Jeremy Allen White) in skill level, but Luca is much more sanguine and philosophical. He was Carmy's sous chef at one time.

Introduced in the season two episode "Honeydew," Luca worked at Noma in Copenhagen and helped train Marcus Brooks (Lionel Boyce) in pastry. Poulter said that "Honeydew" director Ramy Youssef described the Marcus–Luca relationship to him as being like an unfolding lotus blossom.

His character reappeared in the season three finale, "Forever," which was set at the "funeral" for a fictional three-Michelin star Chicago restaurant called Ever, where both Carmy and Luca had once worked for Chef Andrea Terry (Olivia Colman). Working for Carmy at Ever was stressful, and Luca ultimately needed to "get away," but they developed a strong bond nonetheless. Luca told Sydney (Ayo Edebiri) that he had come back to Chicago to check on his unnamed sister who lived there.

Chef Luca, who is experienced and talented enough to run his own restaurant, came in to stage (intern for a pittance) at the Bear in season four, helping out Marcus at pastry in particular. He also supports Tina (Liza Colón-Zayas) in her quest for speed and fluency with her assigned dishes, and according to culinary producer Courtney Storer, "He levels everyone up just with his presence. It's a feeling of reinforcement when another cook steps into the kitchen. You recalibrate. And her instincts are seen by Luca. Knowing that he believes she can do it makes her believe as well."

== Critical reception ==
In 2024, Variety wrote that on "a show that may have too many guest stars, Poulter is one of the best. Luca and Carmy worked together under Chef Terry (Olivia Colman), and though their history isn't revealed until later in the season, the relief brought on by Luca's presence suggests that this quiet, confident life is one Carmy could have lived were it not for the trauma brought on by his family and career. Luca is excellent at what he does, but lacks the desperation for external validation that stunts Carmy emotionally, and the subtlety of Poulter's performance sells it—another way is possible."

== See also ==
- List of The Bear characters
- List of The Bear episodes
- Food of The Bear
- Music on The Bear
- Family on The Bear
- Bibliography of The Bear
