= Basbaas cagaar =

Somali hot sauce

Basbaas cagaar is a green hot sauce of Somalia. Green chili peppers and onions are core ingredients; leaving the seeds in increases the heat. Adding dried shredded coconut to the mixture results in basbaas qumbe.
