= Cambro =

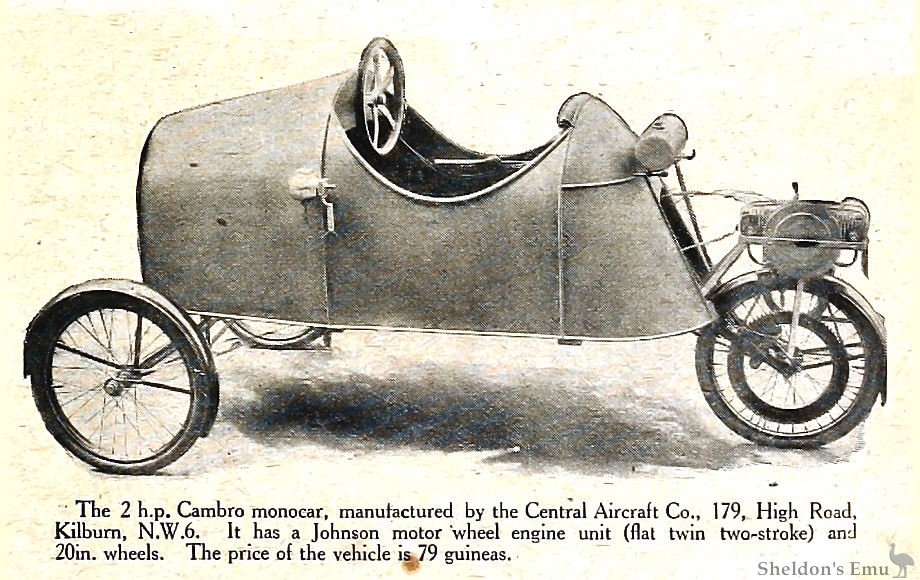
- 1920 illustration depicting Cambro.

Overview
- Manufacturer: Central Aircraft Company
- Production: 1920–21
- Designer: F. J. Camm and G. A. Broomfield

Body and chassis
- Class: Cyclecar

Powertrain
- Engine: Johnson 192 cc, flat twin, two-stroke, air-cooled
- Transmission: single speed, no reverse

Chronology
- Successor: none

The Cambro was a very basic British three-wheeled, single-seat cyclecar made in 1920 and 1921 by the Central Aircraft Company of Northolt, Middlesex.

The car was designed by magazine editor F. J. Camm and G .A. Broomfield and powered by an air-cooled Johnson 192 cc two-stroke flat twin engine, driving the single rear wheel by a chain. The engine was more commonly found in outboard motors and mopeds. There was no reverse, but a free-wheel mechanism was fitted to help maneuver the machine by hand.

The Cambro weighed 165 lbs and was advertised as the cheapest car in the world, costing only 79 guineas (GBP83). The number made is not known.

== See also ==
- List of car manufacturers of the United Kingdom
