= Bolognese (The Bear) =

- The Bear episode
- Episode no.: Season 2 Episode 8
- Directed by: Christopher Storer
- Written by: Rene Gube
- Cinematography by: Andrew Wehde
- Editing by: Megan Mancini; Joanna Naugle
- Production code: XCBV2006
- Original release date: June 22, 2023
- Running time: 32 minutes

Guest appearances
- Oliver Platt as Jimmy "Cicero" Kalinowski; Edwin Lee Gibson as Ebraheim; Molly Gordon as Claire; Robert Townsend as Emmanuel Adamu; Chris Witaske as Pete; Alex Moffat as Josh; Corey Hendrix as Gary "Sweeps" Woods; Lance Baker as examiner; Alma Washington as Angela Brooks; Isa Arciniegas as Daniela; Jack Lancaster as Connor; Liz Sharpe as Calder (FOH applicant)

Episode chronology
← Previous "Forks"	Next → "Omelette"
- The Bear season 2

"Bolognese" is the eighth episode of the second season of the American television comedy-drama series The Bear. It is the 16th overall episode of the series and was written by co-executive producer Rene Gube, and directed by series creator Christopher Storer. It was released on Hulu on June 22, 2023, along with the rest of the season.

The series follows Carmen "Carmy" Berzatto, an award-winning New York City chef de cuisine, who returns to his hometown of Chicago to run his late brother Michael's failing Italian beef sandwich shop. In the episode, The Bear prepares for a fire suppression exam, which will decide if the restaurant will be allowed to open.

The episode received highly positive reviews from critics, who praised the tension and performances.

== Plot ==
With two weeks to go before the opening, The Bear prepares for a fire suppression exam. Ebraheim (Edwin Lee Gibson) returns and apologizes to Tina (Liza Colón-Zayas) for his absence. Ebraheim then decides to take over the restaurant's takeout sandwich window, helping Tina in focusing in her other duties.

Carmy (Jeremy Allen White) tells Sydney (Ayo Edebiri) that he decided to change part of the menu after consulting it with Claire (Molly Gordon), leaving her worried over her impact in Carmy's life. Richie (Ebon Moss-Bachrach) returns, now wearing suits and apologizing to Natalie (Abby Elliott) for his behavior. He then helps her in interviewing front-of-house candidates, with Richie challenging the candidates into seeing their commitment to perfection. Marcus (Lionel Boyce) has also returned, and used his knowledge from Copenhagen to be more creative with the meals.

Fak (Matty Matheson), who has been trying to figure out why the restaurant keeps failing the fire suppression system test, has a last-minute epiphany just before the inspector comes that Mikey disabled it when he tried to commit insurance fraud by burning down the restaurant, and quickly fixes it in time. The inspector tests the system in front of everyone, and despite their concerns, he certifies the system as effective, allowing them to finally open the restaurant. As the staff prepares for the final arrangements, Carmy leaves. Now calling Claire his girlfriend, Carmy decides to make her dinner for the first time.

== Production ==
=== Development ===
In May 2023, Hulu confirmed that the eighth episode of the season would be titled "Bolognese", and was to be written by co-executive producer Rene Gube, and directed by series creator Christopher Storer. It was Gube's second writing credit, and Storer's tenth directing credit.

=== Costuming ===
Richie returns the Bear wearing suits, specifically a wool suit from designer Hugo Boss. Ebon Moss-Bachrach and costume designer Courtney Wheeler collaborated on the selection; Moss-Bachrach thought "Richie would emulate Al Pacino's intense, monochrome-clad Vincent Hanna from 1995's Heat, based on a real Chicago heist. Wheeler imagined that Richie wanted to re-create his inspiring stagiaire aesthetic, plus the all-black serendipitously coordinated with The Bear's decor." Wheeler intentionally did not tailor the suit further "because Richie wouldn't have." The look is "isn't a slim fit, but a little more old-timey...the black shirt has some subtle stripes to it that almost even look sparkly."

=== Set decoration, production design, sound design ===
Blueprint of the renovated Bear restaurant

Cinematographer Andrew Wehde and production designer Merje Veski collaborated closely on the construction of the restaurant set. According to Wehde, "We'd spend all day with blueprints and lighting diagrams, thinking about every specific light." The resulting is now "controlled through a rigging board with high CRI and colour-adjustable, LED-based lights." Sound production mixer Scott D. Smith told Variety in 2025, "Since that's a working kitchen on set that they built with working stoves and everything, it was a big issue to try and actually make that functional and still get dialogue. A lot of discussions with the HVAC people, the studio, because they had to punch a hole in the top of the stage to exhaust it. A lot of effort went into that just so that we could try and get some usable dialogue hopefully during the scenes that they're actually doing cooking."

Chicago artist Denise Dietz did the "Sistine Chapel drawings" of proposed dishes that Carmy showed Syd.

=== Music ===
The songs for the episode are "Lay My Love" by Brian Eno and John Cale, "Stop Your Sobbing" by The Pretenders, "The Crane Wife 3" by The Decemberists, and "Throw Your Arms Around Me" by Neil Finn and Eddie Vedder.

== Reception ==
"Bolognese" received highly positive reviews from critics. Marah Eakin of Vulture gave the episode a 4 star out of 5 rating and wrote, "He's showing her he cares in the way he best knows how, and she rewards him with a hug and a kiss. At this point, if these two ran off and got married, I wouldn't be mad. They seem endgame already—even if Carmy didn't know if she was his girlfriend."

A.J. Daulerio of Decider wrote, "The Bear is officially a restaurant. To celebrate, Carmy goes over to Claire's apartment and finally makes his girlfriend dinner." Arnav Srivastava of The Review Geek gave the episode a 3.5 star rating out of 5 and wrote, "I thought the dynamics of this episode were a little bit off due to it being centred around the test. Anyway, the path to the final two episodes is now clear and the opening of The Bear seems like a real possibility." Karl R De Mesa from Show Snob wrote, "With everything cleared for their soft opening, it's time they got down to finalizing their menu. Can't wait for friends and family night."

Rafa Boladeras of MovieWeb named the episode as the eighth best of the season, writing "The episode delivers, as the moment of the test feels for audiences like a Hail Mary pass, or a love declaration, or the big final battle, creating expectations and tension while also being a scary moment." Jasmine Blu of TV Fanatic named the episode as the seventh best of the season, writing "The stakes were fairly high in this installment, with The Bear needing to pass the Fire Suppression test if they hoped even to get the restaurant going in time. It was their last shot at it, but since we could've envisioned they'd make it through, it wasn't as nerve-wracking as other plot points throughout the season."
