= Xawaash =

Somali spice blend

Xawaash is a Somali spice blend composed of black peppercorns, cinnamon bark, cloves, coriander, cumin, green cardamom, and turmeric powder. The name is pronounced ha-waash and means "essentials." It has been described as "the garam masala of Somalia."
