= Purse hook =

Hook to hang a purse or handbag on

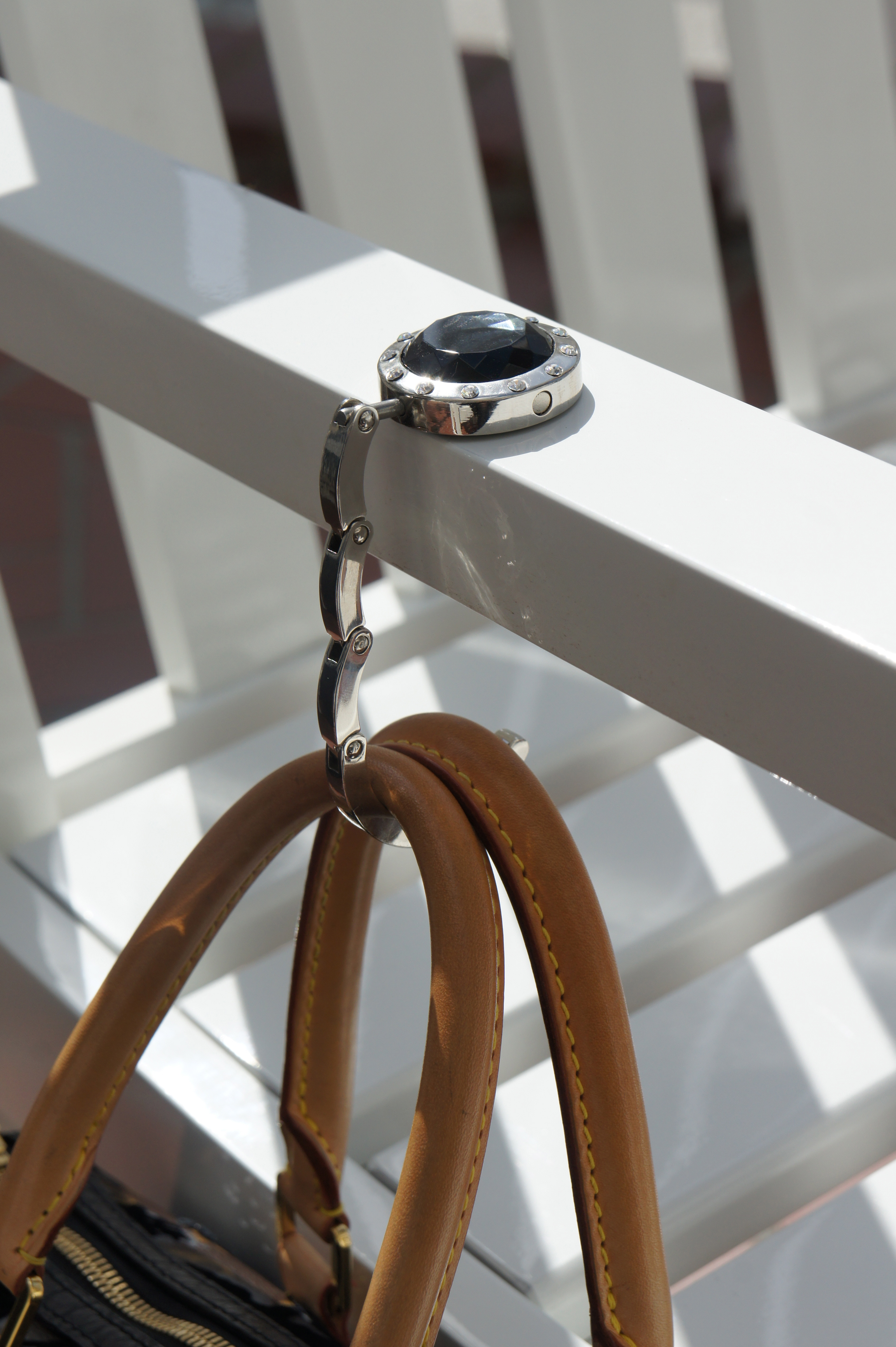
Modern purse hook from Taeshy

A purse hook (also known as a handbag hook or handbag hanger) is a type of hook meant to temporarily secure a purse or handbag to a table, sink or armrest. Such hooks have been available since the 1920s. Queen Elizabeth II was said to employ an oddly shaped one that looks like a soldier from World War II to hang her handbags on.

== Reasons for use ==
The practical uses are numerous; hanging a purse, bag, groceries, umbrella or any item that can be hung and needs to be kept close, for convenient access or to discourage theft.

A bag placed on the floor in a restaurant or bathroom will collect bacteria, fungi, and viruses.

In Brazil there is a superstition that a woman will lose all of her money if she puts her purse on the floor.

== Types ==
There are at least five types of purse hooks available. The order is based on patent file dates.

- The original L style type with a circular pad and a rigid bent wire.
- The link type with circular pad and a set links that either wrap around the pad or make a "hook"
- A spring closing bracelet type
- A twisting ring type
- An S-shaped purse hanger

=== Gallery of purse hook types ===
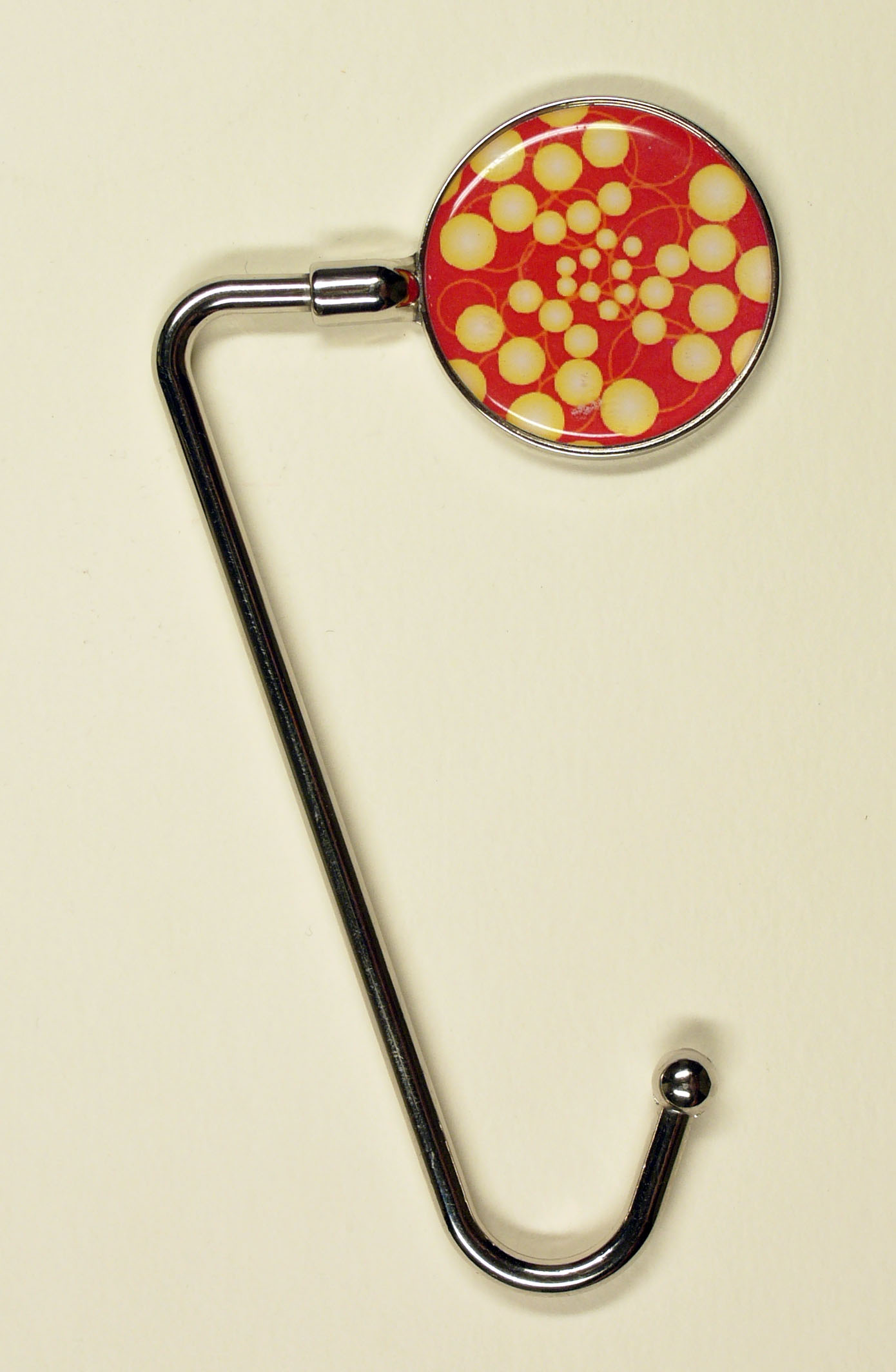
L style type of purse hook with rotating pad and wire hook. Photograph shows pad and wire hook in the same plane (storage position) but when in use the pad is rotated 90 degrees and rests horizontally on the tabletop. The hook is then suspended below the tabletop to accept the bagstrap.

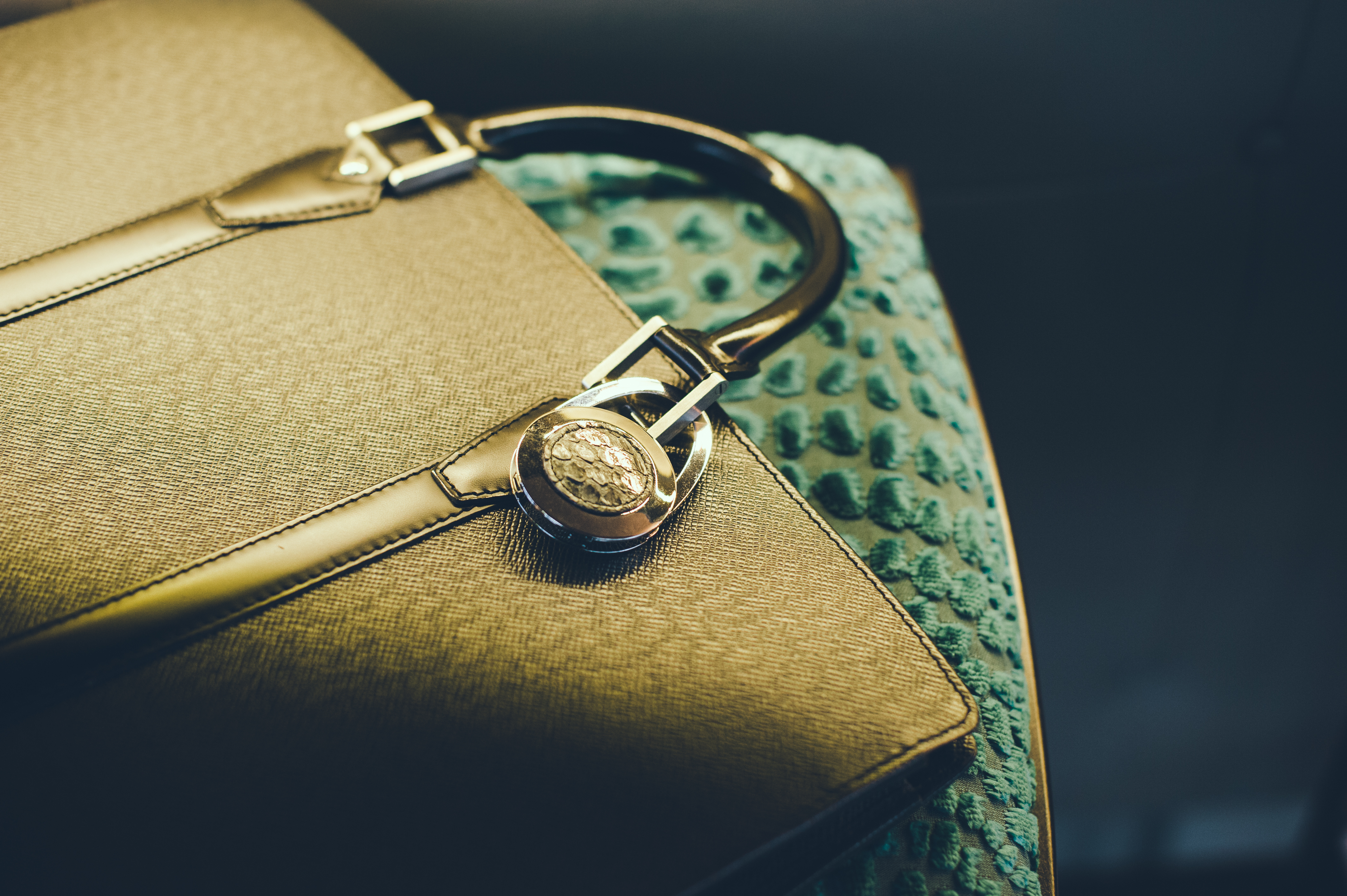
Clip-on purse hook that doubles as jewelry for your handbag.

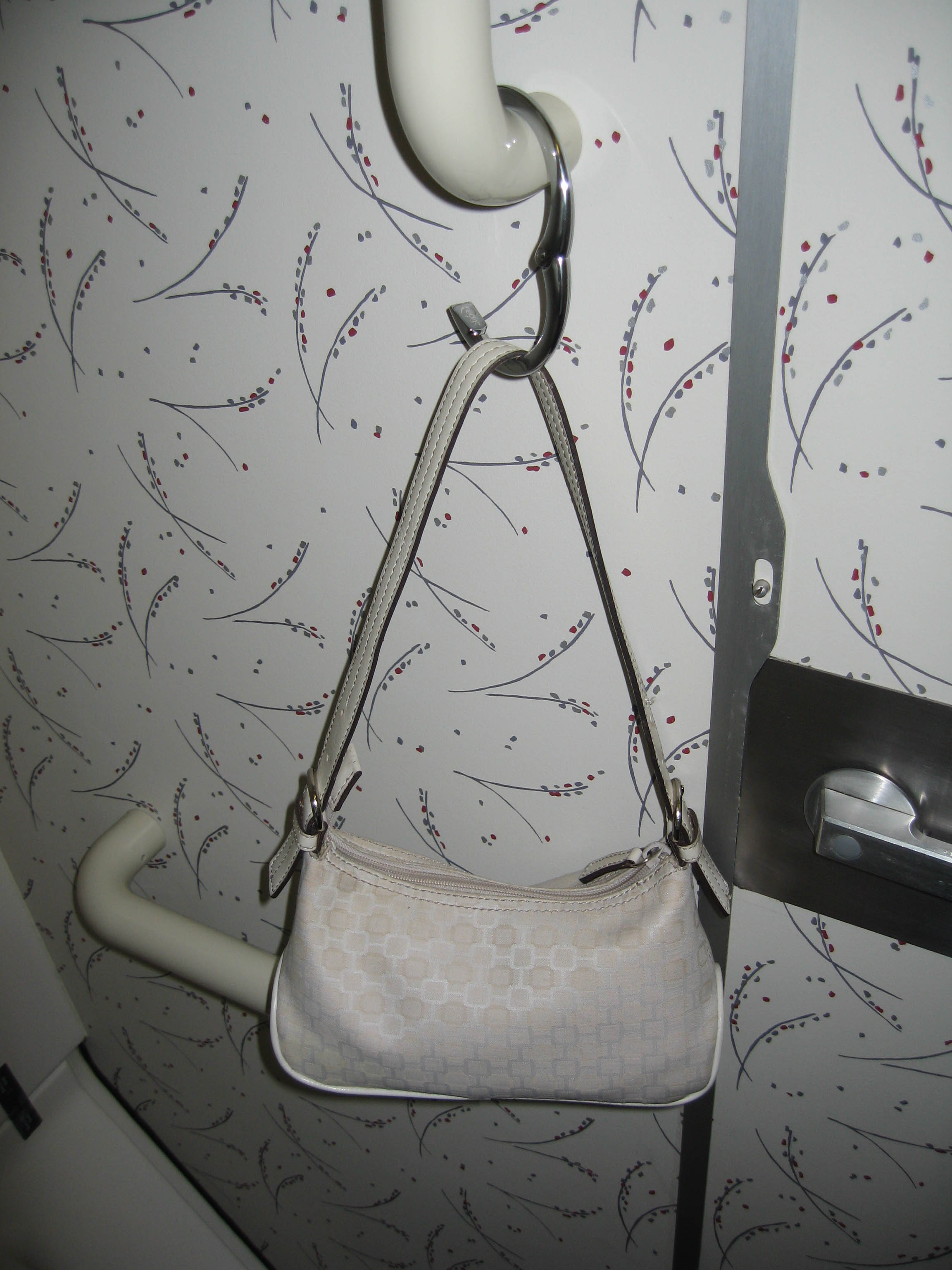
Spring closing bracelet type of purse hook.
