= Honeydew (The Bear) =

- The Bear episode
- Episode no.: Season 2 Episode 4
- Directed by: Ramy Youssef
- Written by: Stacy Osei-Kuffour
- Cinematography by: Adam Newport-Berra
- Editing by: Adam Epstein; Joanna Naugle
- Production code: XCBV2004
- Original release date: June 22, 2023
- Running time: 29 minutes

Guest appearances
- Will Poulter as Chef Luca; Carmen Christopher as Chester; Alex Moffat as Josh; Corey Hendrix as Gary "Sweeps" Woods; José Cervantes as Angel; Richard Esteras as Manny; Alma Washington as Angela Brooks; Alka Nayyar as Kristy; Martin Kongstad as cyclist; Mac Wallach as interviewee no. 1; Snag Flynn as interviewee no. 2

Episode chronology
| ← Previous "Sundae" | Next → "Pop" |
- The Bear season 2

"Honeydew" is the fourth episode of the second season of the American television comedy-drama The Bear. It is the 12th overall episode of the series and was written by supervising producer Stacy Osei-Kuffour and directed by Ramy Youssef. It was released on Hulu on June 22, 2023, along with the rest of the season.

The series follows Carmen "Carmy" Berzatto, an award-winning New York City chef de cuisine, who returns to his hometown of Chicago to run his late brother Michael's failing Italian beef sandwich shop. In the episode, Marcus travels to Denmark to learn three unique desserts, working alongside an experienced chef.

The episode received critical acclaim, with Will Poulter's guest appearance receiving major praise, while the focus on Marcus and Youssef's directing also received enormous praise. It is typically ranked as one of the top 10 best episodes of The Bear.

== Plot ==
With seven weeks left before the grand opening, Carmy (Jeremy Allen White) and Natalie (Abby Elliott) discuss a recent problem with trademarking the name. Noticing her recent behavior, Natalie finally reveals her pregnancy and asks him to keep it a secret. However, their conversation is overheard as the wall near them has fallen, with Richie (Ebon Moss-Bachrach) saying he knew it already.

Marcus (Lionel Boyce) is assigned to create three unique desserts, and he must leave his bedridden mother in the care of a nurse. He arrives at Copenhagen, where he stays on a houseboat for a few days. He arrives at the restaurant, meeting the pastry chef Luca (Will Poulter), who uses a strict and disciplined approach to cooking. While Marcus initially struggles to adapt to the methods, he slowly gets to understand Luca's approach. Marcus and Luca quickly form a kinship, and Luca opens up about his past. He explains how he was arrogant when he was younger, but after meeting a more experienced chef (implied to be Carmy), he learned how to appreciate his talent while also appreciating life outside the kitchen. He adds that if he cannot be the best in anything, he can do what is best for himself and be content with his life.

At night, Marcus finds a Danish man stuck in a fence after accidentally crashing his bicycle. He removes the fence and helps the man to leave safely. Later, he talks with Sydney (Ayo Edebiri) on the phone, stating that he misses everything about Chicago. Before hanging up, Sydney tells Marcus that he must take care of himself if he wants to help his mother. At the kitchen, Marcus successfully replicates a meal that Luca suggested, which he gleefully eats.

== Reception ==
"Honeydew" received critical acclaim. Justin Charity of The Ringer wrote, "None of these characters deserve the rough treatment to which they often subjected themselves at the Original Beef, but Marcus in particular, in the first years of his relatively late start in the culinary world, needs a cooler head and a steadier hand than Carm and Syd typically provide in the heat of the moment. In fairness, I, too, lost my mind watching Marcus still fussing over those goddamn doughnuts while his colleagues were clearly in agony during the infamous to-go order meltdown in last season's penultimate episode. But he needs someone to nurture that whimsy in him, to develop that curiosity into talent."

Alex Abad-Santos of Vox wrote, "On the one hand, Luca realized he'd never be the best, and on the other, this unnamed chef somehow unburdened him from the pressure he was putting on himself, allowing him to be the best he could be. Luca found community in competition and realized that talent isn't a zero-sum game where someone else's talent negates your own. There's room for everyone; talent inspires and fosters success, and Marcus is part of that circle."

Marah Eakin of Vulture gave the episode a perfect 5 star out of 5 rating and wrote, "I left "Honeydew" even more in love with Marcus than I already was, and really impressed with Lionel Boyce's work in the role. He's an island of chill calm in an ocean of roiling, nightmarishly hard times and on a show like The Bear, that kind of energy and presence is invaluable, to say the least." A.J. Daulerio of Decider wrote, "This is one gorgeous-looking TV episode. Director Ramy Youssef knows how to capture the intricacies of what we're watching Marcus learn. The beauty he sees is what we're shown on screen."

One Salon.com columnist thought the episode stood out most for its "homoerotic undertones."

=== Accolades ===
| Award | Category | Nominee | Result | Ref. |
|---|---|---|---|---|
| Black Reel TV Awards | Outstanding Writing in a Comedy Series | Stacy Osei-Kuffour | Nominated | |
| Directors Guild of America Awards | Outstanding Directorial Achievement in Comedy Series | Ramy Youssef | Nominated | |
| Primetime Emmy Awards | Outstanding Directing for a Comedy Series | Ramy Youssef | Nominated | |
| Primetime Emmy Awards | Outstanding Supporting Actor in a Comedy Series | Lionel Boyce | Nominated | |
| Primetime Creative Arts Emmy Awards | Outstanding Guest Actor in a Comedy Series | Will Poulter | Nominated | |
