= Claire Dunlap =

Fictional character, The Bear TV series

- The Bear character
- Molly Gordon as Claire in "Tomorrow"
- First appearance: "Pasta"; June 22, 2023
- Last appearance: "The Original Beef of Chicagoland"; June 25, 2026
- Created by: Christopher Storer; Joanna Calo
- Portrayed by: Molly Gordon

In-universe information
- Nickname: Claire Bear
- Occupation: Emergency room physician

Claire Dunlap, also known as Claire Bear, is a character on the American TV series The Bear, played by Molly Gordon. She works as an emergency medicine physician and was a childhood neighbor of the Berzattos. She and Carmy (Jeremy Allen White) enter and exit a romantic relationship in season 2.

== Development and casting ==
Gordon and The Bear guest star Gillian Jacobs were both in the cast of Life of the Party; Jacobs introduced Gordon to her partner and The Bear creator Storer. In 2023, she said of the character:

"I feel so grateful that I'm able to have this role where I get to be a human woman and not just this sweet, sweet girl...She sees right through...to the core of Carmy...I've been with men [in my own personal life], and we were so happy together...But the happiness made them so angry and sad."

Storer cast Gordon in The Bear after having directed her in a 2019 episode of Ramy and told the Washington Post that, "She's one of those actors that can go from light to dark very quickly...She has these eyes that are so piercing that when you're talking to her, you sort of feel like not only do you have her undivided attention but also her undivided love."

The casting of Gordon as Claire was announced on Matty Matheson's Instagram and confirmed by Variety. In a profile published six days after the season 2 episodes were released, New York Times feature writer Alexis Soloski described the newest addition to The Bear cast, writing, "I had also heard her described as a girl-next-door type. This rang less true. Gordon has too much savvy for that, too much drive. She is more like the girl who knows exactly where you hide your spare key and can break into your house at will."

== Name ==
Claire's nickname, Claire Bear, is part "fun little rhyme" but also suggestive of Berzatto, hinting that she might someday marry into the family and take her husband's name legally.

== Claire to 2018 ==
Richie (Ebon Moss-Bachrach) told Claire's friend and roommate Kelly (Mitra Jouhari) at the soft launch of the restaurant that he and Claire "grew up together." Tiff used to babysit Claire when she was little; there are photos of them together as adults on the basement table in the restaurant in "Beef." Carmy knows Claire's cousins Big Denny and Mac. (Denny is dead.)

Richie and Mikey (Jon Bernthal) "used to give [Carmy] shit about" Claire. In "Fishes," Carmy asks Richie why he and Mikey are so convinced that he "was in love" with Claire ("Where did you guys get this from that I'm in love with her?"), Richie says, "You used to have all those drawings" that they saw when Carmy was in high school. In "Pop" Claire tells Carmy "I also remembered that I sat behind you in algebra," in their freshman year, some 15 years prior, when they both would have been about 14 or 15, but he does not remember that seating arrangement ("Did you really?"). She remembers that Carmy spent his class time doodling and sketching, and he tells her at that time he was working out designs for clothes, describing what he later found to be Thom Browne's cropped-and-cuffed worsted wool "pique suiting single-pleat" trousers. As told by The Bear costume designer Courtney Wheeler, "Chris [Storer] was obsessed with Thom Browne. One of his first suits when he made it and had his big check was a Thom Browne suit."

Carmy's older brothers first tried to set up Carmy and Claire about five years ago, when Carmy came home from Copenhagen for Christmas. Cousin Stevie (John Mulaney) told Carmy that Claire, who was back then still in medical school, that "this woman teaches CPR to differently abled college kids." Jon Bernthal improvised the "all that and a basket of biscuits" in Mikey's description of Claire to Carmy. Mikey and Richie variously describe Claire as being "like a librarian in a fuckin' porno" and "legitimate fucking wizard" and "stacked physically and mentally" and "But she's hot now, Carm." Carmy is mildly horrified, pointing out to Richie "Homie, you're having a child. Like, what the fuck?" Mikey narrates how much he has promoted adult Carmy to his school-age crush: "We just massaged the fuckin'...It's Christmas. I fuckin' put in a good word...I told her about Napa, about Copen—"

== Claire in 2023 ==
=== Season 2 ===
Dr. Claire Dunlap, called Claire Bear, was a fourth-year medical resident in emergency medicine when she was introduced in the season 2 episode "Pasta." In early March 2023, Carmy runs into Claire in the refrigerator/freezer section of Potash Market, a grocery store located on State Street in the Gold Coast district. Carmy regularly visits that specialty store, founded 1950; receipts from Potash are visible in Carmy's apartment in the previous episode "Beef." She knows he planned to call a new restaurant the Bear; Carmy looks confounded and loses a million-dollar bet that she does not know. "Strange Currencies" by R.E.M. starts playing during their conversation and later recurs while Carmy is having a panic attack, again in season 3 while Carmy is isolating himself and trying to get up the courage to apologize to Claire, and it starts up a fourth time in season 4 after she tells Carmy to check his mom's house for something she lost.

Carmy initially withholds himself from Claire, telling her his phone number but changing the last digit. But in "Sundae," Claire having gotten his correct number from their mutual friend Neil Fak, calls him and they go out on a quasi-date, "after some gentle ribbing and casual hedging from Carmy, she ends up enlisting his help to move her mom's things" in the roomy old Original Beef minivan. In episode 5, "Pop" the couple hook up in the half-baked restaurant. Executive producer Storer told an interviewer, "Episode five, which Joanna [Calo] directed beautifully, that's one of my favorite episodes of the season. They're at a weird high school reunion party, and it feels childlike. It's like Carmy is 15 again. And I feel like because he started this mission of becoming a chef at such a young age, he missed out on a lot of his life and almost stopped developing." One critic saw the episode, with its soundtrack songs "Pretty in Pink," "Weird Romance," and "Can't Hardly Wait" as an homage to the "dark heart of the suburbs," and the teen romances depicted in the movies of Chicago filmmaker John Hughes. As retold in a study of The Bear's cinematic urbanism:

Offering a respite and a distraction from the restaurant, Carmen's romance with Claire develops outside this space...Their relationship is further complicated by Carmen's entire family's awareness of his years-long infatuation with Claire. Other characters' knowing looks combined with the claustrophobic chaos of the restaurant renovation chase Carmen and Claire on a car journey out of the city, followed by an adventure at a house party. The episode teases what Carmen's life would be like if he detached himself from the memories as he misrepresents himself to the other guests at the party. However, the bittersweet relationship is doomed from the start. Their few scenes together are sequestered to the semi-darkness of Carmen's flat, previously a site of exhaustion and nightmares.

Determined to do better than the bad boyfriend who dated Kelly (Mitra Jouhari) for five years and never made her dinner even once, Carmy takes the time to prepare a homemade bucatini and bolognese dish for Claire in the episode "Bolognese." Per costume designer Wheeler, "even though it's a blink-and-you-miss-it moment, we did have Carmy in a pair of sick broken-in 1950s Levi's we got from Knee Deep in Chicago during his scene at home with Claire." The morning after, Carmy has a panic attack in the alley behind the restaurant, including visions of high-school era Claire, when she still wore glasses, sketched in pen-and-ink on lined notebook paper. Claire attended the May 2023 soft launch of the Bear restaurant at the invitation of Carmy, with Kelly as her plus one. Despite being a neighbor of the Berzatto clan from way back, she seems bewildered by the pop-culture references of the Faks. Vulture recapper Marah Eakin noted that The Empire Strikes Back is their lingua franca, which the doctor seemingly does not speak: "I like how [Ted] and Neil tried to explain to Claire where Carmy was by saying, 'Jabba got his ass,' like that's a thing everyone would immediately clock as meaning 'He's locked in the freezer.' Another of their lines, 'He's in there solo...Han Solo,' is even worse." Concerned, Claire enters the kitchen just in time to overhear a Carmy rant intended for Tina (Liza Colón-Zayas). She said she was sorry to hear that and walked away, kissing Richie goodbye. Carmy then ghosted Claire.

=== Season 3 ===
Characterized by Carmy as "the peace" in season 3, and as a "piece of ass" by Ted Fak (Ricky Staffieri) in the same conversation, "Claire is the living antithesis of [Carmy's] lifestyle, despite having a medical career that's even more high-stakes than his own. In fact, she is essentially flawless when held up against any other character in The Bear...She conducts herself in a much less intense way." In "Apologies," Tiff reports to Richie that Claire told her about Carmy's relationship-ending fridge rant that, "[Carmy] said something like, if anything good happens to him, it's gonna explode in his face, and it'd be all her fault or something." When interviewed after the release of season 3, Ebon Moss-Bachrach suggested that Claire ought to leave the relationship in the past: "I would tell Claire to probably distance herself...like, he has no personal life, and he lives and dies for the restaurant. He doesn't really seem like boyfriend material to me?"

=== Seasons 4 and 5 ===
In the season 4 episode "Scallop," an after-midnight, front-step apology led to an apparent rapprochement. As Carmy runs to Claire's apartment for a late-night apology, the soundtrack song is "Haunted When the Minutes Drag," from the British band Love and Rockets' 1985 album Seventh Dream of Teenage Heaven, which is used to convey a "dreamlike and dreary" atmosphere that "paces the scene like a ghost." Another music columnist wrote, "If The Bear has a single 'Carmy staring into the abyss' anthem, this is it. Love and Rockets were already one of my favourite 80s alt-rock bands (Bauhaus offshoots, hello?), but hearing this track in that quiet, gut-punch of a moment hit differently. It's moody, sprawling, and exactly the kind of song you'd play at 2 a.m. while overthinking life choices—so, basically, The Bear distilled into four and a half minutes." "Haunted When the Minutes Drag" was earlier on the soundtrack of the 1988 John Hughes suburban marriage dramedy She's Having a Baby, as does "Apron Strings" by Everything But the Girl, which plays in the wedding episode. Substream magazine suggested that the apology might have been too little too late to restore the romance: "It was never going to be that easy for Carmy and Claire to come back together—months had gone by before he apologized. Even then, Carmy takes a long time actually to say the words." The encounter is strained, with Claire in tears and Carmy incoherent, and per Collider, "The Bear writers want us to forget just how incredibly poorly Carmy has treated Claire...[but] it's obvious how devastated she still is by the way their relationship ended."

Also in season 4, Claire was at the hospital where Emmanuel Adamu (Robert Townsend) was being treated for what was initially reported to Syd (Ayo Edebiri) as a heart attack but turned out to be merely a first-degree heart block. She listened while Syd poured her heart out about her dad and her life circumstances generally. Claire and Carmy reconnect at Tiffany's wedding on October 1, 2023, talking while a cover version of "Throw Your Arms Around Me" by Eddie Vedder plays in the background. Carmy congratulates Claire on finishing her residency, meaning she is now a fully licensed and certified physician, and they dance together at the daytime wedding.

A day or two later, in "Tonnato," Carmy finds Claire's green sweatshirt in a bedroom closet (otherwise stocked with button-down flannel shirts and ice skates) at the Berzatto house. The room is decorated with "old show posters" for Chicago punk bands (the Catburglars, the Brokedowns, and Dillinger Four), as well as stacks of compact discs and a multifunction stereo system and CD player on the dresser. The sweatshirt was last seen at a birthday party some years past, when Donna (Jamie Lee Curtis) started a fire while trying to grill pizzas. In the ensuing hullabaloo, Claire accidentally forgot her sweatshirt. Claire's final appearance is as a guest at Evie Jerimovich's birthday party in the series finale, "The Original Beef of Chicagoland." In the telling of Variety, "The whole gang is there—including absentee guest stars Bob Odenkirk, Josh Hartnett, and Molly Gordon (we never do get full closure on the Carmy and Claire romance)."

== Personal style ==
Costume designer Courtney Wheeler told Harper's Bazaar in 2025, "For her casual style, we wanted it to feel laid-back but not cheap. She definitely knows what she's putting on her body, but she's also very pared-back and easy...All she ever really needs is a really lovely-fitting jean. When she dresses up, it's a little bit more—I'm trying not to use the word demure. I don't even think that's the right word for it and who she is...For the wedding, she wore a deep-red gown from Victoria Beckham that was simple and flattering, and Carmy couldn't help but notice her. Claire is confident, and her clothes also balance well when next to Carmy."

== Reception ==
Radikha Seth, British Vogue's film and culture editor, immediately tagged Claire as an inauthentic "pure male fantasy" who compared badly to "brilliantly written female characters" Tina, Natalie (Abby Elliott), Sydney, Andrea Terry (Olivia Colman), and Donna Berzatto. Seth argued that Claire's character is built a shallow foundation of dialogue ("she's quippy; she finishes his sentences; she's achingly cool; she asks, albeit indirectly, for his number; and, despite not having seen Carmy in years, remembers what he said he'd name his restaurant") upon which were built thin walls of lighting and cinematography (she "comes into focus softly, reflected in the glass...bathed in a gentle, hazy, golden glow"). Seth characterized her as a "textbook 'cool girl' that men dream about...she's hot, always game, fun, and someone who never gets angry at her man, but only smiles in a chagrin loving manner...In the end, Claire is largely defined by all the things she doesn’t do. Unlike Syd and Nat, who constantly badger Carmy about getting more forks and finalising the menu and not picking the fancy plates, she seems to expect and demand nothing from him."

Following the release of season 4, a Collider columnist wrote, "The Bear has been pushing Carmy and Claire's romance from her very first appearance, even though the relationship just doesn't have the spark that many of The Bear's other potential romantic pairings do. All that Carmy and Claire have going for them is off-camera history. On-camera, though, their conversations all feel surface-level, and the deeper moments of confession from Carmy don't feel earned...Carmy's relationship with Claire seems to represent the past, while his relationship with Sydney represents the future." Miscelana magazine felt differently, arguing that the distance between Carmy and Claire stalls the narrative progression: "Claire, the sweet and idealized love of Carmy’s life, isn't in a rush to jump back into the melodrama. And the show respects that: Claire stays away. But her absence lingers. Their relationship, even in silence, was the emotional counterbalance to the chaos."

Some fans were irritated by the return of Claire in season 4. Tara Ariano of Cracked wrote, following season 4, "I guess we're supposed to root for these people who've known each other since they were children, even though they're often thrown back in each other's paths at events where everyone considers themselves 'cousins'? I've been charmed by Gordon elsewhere (in Theater Camp, for example), but Claire has to eat a lot of shit in this role, and for a guy who is not worth it; there's only so much Gordon can do to sell the illusion that he is." Other critics have argued that the extended backstory of Claire and Carmy feels like a "retcon" and that Claire is presented as a weakly characterized "Mary Sue" type. Following the release of "Gary," Belen Edwards of Mashable grouped Claire, pre-divorce Tiff, and Sherri from Gary into a set of preternaturally supportive ninnies with no needs or even hobbies that might distract from the all-consuming woes of their men: "Their heads constantly askew, their eyes lit up in adoration, their mouths always ready to offer up an eager laugh or some cornball advice, these characters morph into The Bear's single idea of a Woman In Love."

One study of masculinity in contemporary chef-centric narratives argued that the opening night of the Bear "ends in disaster, at least for Carmen," in part because he had been "neglectful" and was "distracted" by the reappearance of his "teenage love." Drawing on the "application of monomyth" in P. S. Nieves' 2018 Food and Masculinity in Contemporary Autobiographies: Cast-Iron Man, "The Chef and the City" (2026) asserts that typically a chef protagonist suffers and encounters "temptations," which are "'intended to test his stamina for the mission at hand.'" Nieves contends that Joseph Campbell believed that most of the "temptations that distract the hero from his purpose" are sexual.

One analysis of The Bear's representation of Chicago urbanism argued that "The Bear conveys the idea that Chicago's ethos is grounded in the values of working‑class communities, which pursue excellence in their chosen specialties and demonstrate exceptional care and hospitality toward guests and visitors. The issue of hospitality appears in two institutional contexts featured in the series, medical facilities and restaurant ventures." The medical-care aspect is represented by Marcus (Lionel Boyce) taking care of his terminally ill mother in the opening scene of season 2 and by medical doctor Claire. In "Forks," Garrett (Andrew Lopez) coaches Richie with the statement, "I used to work for this guy who used to say that taking care of people at the highest level was like working at a hospital...restaurants and hospitals use the same word, hospitality." For good measure, the show draws a connection between how chefs must account for possible food allergies while doctors must account for penicillin allergies, but "though both kitchens and hospitals are fast-paced and high-pressure environments, they are still worlds apart and don't necessarily run in the same professional or social circles."

== See also ==
- List of The Bear characters
- List of The Bear episodes
- Food of The Bear
- Music on The Bear
- Family on The Bear

== Sources ==
- Martynuska, Małgorzata (February 2026). "'Every Second Counts': Representing Chicago's Urban Identity in the TV Series The Bear". Perspektywy Kultury. 53 (2). Kraków: Ignatianum University in Cracow: 75–91. ISSN 2081-1446.
- Nikolova, Zlatina (July 2025). "'Every second counts': Urban affect and culinary chaos in The Bear". The Journal of Popular Television. 13 (1): 43–59. doi:10.1386/jptv_00135_1. ISSN 2046-9861.
- Singer, Christoph (2026). "The chef and the city: Mobile masculinities in Chef and The Bear". Journal of Urban Cultural Studies. 13 (1): 119–132. doi:10.1386/jucs_00114_1. ISSN 2050-9790.
