= Homecoming (The Penguin) =

- The Penguin episode
- Episode no.: Episode 5
- Directed by: Helen Shaver
- Written by: Breannah Gibson; Shaye Ogbonna
- Cinematography by: Jonathan Freeman
- Editing by: Andy Keir
- Original air date: October 20, 2024
- Running time: 55 minutes

Guest appearance
- Aria Shahghasemi as Taj Maroni

Episode chronology
← Previous "Cent'Anni"	Next → "Gold Summit"

"Homecoming" is the fifth episode of the American crime drama television miniseries The Penguin, a spin-off from the film The Batman. The episode was written by co-producers Breannah Gibson and Shaye Ogbonna, and directed by Helen Shaver. It was first broadcast on HBO in the United States on October 20, 2024, and also was available on Max on the same date.

Set shortly after the events of the film, the series explores the rise to power of Oswald "Oz" Cobb / Penguin (portrayed by Colin Farrell) in Gotham City's criminal underworld. Oz finds himself allied with a young man named Victor (Rhenzy Feliz), while also having to deal with the presence of Sofia Falcone (Cristin Milioti), who wants answers regarding her brother's disappearance. In the episode, Oz tries to negotiate with the Maronis, while Sofia forces Johnny Viti (Michael Kelly) to set up a meeting.

According to Nielsen Media Research, the episode was seen by an estimated 0.385 million household viewers and gained a 0.09 ratings share among adults aged 18–49. The episode received positive reviews from critics, who praised the performances, writing, twists and tone.

== Plot ==
After escaping the nightclub, (Note: As depicted in "Bliss".) Oz and Victor burn the car in the street. While Victor is worried that Sofia might take retaliation, Oz is not too worried about it, and appreciates Victor's rescue.

To get a lead on the gang war, Oz and his henchmen kidnap Taj, the son of the Maronis, and force Salvatore and Nadia to make an exchange; he will return Taj, if Nadia returns the mushroom shipment she took from Oz. Sal and Nadia reluctantly agree to his terms. On his way out of prison, Oz sees a news report detailing a gas leak that killed nearly everyone in the Falcone estate, with Sofia among the few survivors. (Note: As depicted in "Cent'Anni".) At the estate, Sofia is questioned by the police chief over the events and Johnny Viti's whereabouts, but she deflects any question. Viti is revealed to be held hostage underneath the Falcone family cemetery, with Sofia torturing him to gain access to the Falcone's stash of money.

While Oz's gang is worried over the death of the Falcones, Oz considers it an advantage as Sofia did the work for them. He then assigns Victor to take care of his mother Francis, disappointing Victor. As Oz arrives at a warehouse to meet with Nadia, he has a guard, Mikey Stone, try to kill Sal in prison. After delivering Taj safely, Nadia locks the warehouse's doors and a gunfight ensues, which culminates when Oz lights Nadia and Taj on fire, killing them. However, the fire activates the chemical fire extinguishing sprays, forcing Oz to quickly take the car with the mushrooms and leave for his base. He then discovers that nearly all of the mushrooms died, leaving him with just two small buckets of usable product. To complicate matters, he is called by Sal, who survived the assassination attempt, killed Mikey, and escaped from Blackgate. He threatens Oz's life, and in return Oz teases that he should call his wife. Oz gets Victor to take Francis into hiding, and Victor takes her to an old apartment in Crown Point, a neighborhood where Victor grew up in that was heavily damaged by the floods.

After being tortured, Viti explains that Sofia's mother, Isabella Gigante, was planning to leave Carmine Falcone, but could not due to her own children, eventually agreeing to support her desire to be the new head of the family. Dr. Rush later visits Sofia, revealing that he knows she was involved in the gas leak, but nevertheless supports the decision and is willing to stay with her. She gets Viti to set up a meeting with the last remaining henchmen of the family, proclaiming that she is now taking over the business. When Viti resists, Sofia shoots him in the head. She declares that she will use the name "Gigante" - her mother's maiden name - and offers them a share in her father's money for their loyalty, which they accept.

That night, Sofia visits Sal at his secluded cabin, and offers him a partnership, planning for them to kill Oz and take over the city. Oz arrives at the apartment that Victor's at and tries to console Francis, but she turns him down. He thanks Victor for his actions, and opens up about the death of his siblings. Finding an old trolley token in the house, Oz gets Victor to accompany him to an abandoned underground trolley station he visited in his childhood. Oz turns on the lights, and decides to use the station as a base for his mushroom operation.

== Production ==
=== Development ===
The episode was written by co-producers Breannah Gibson and Shaye Ogbonna, and directed by Helen Shaver. It marked Gibson's first writing credit, Ogbonna's first writing credit, and Shaver's second directing credit.

=== Writing ===
On Nadia's death, Shohreh Aghdashloo said, "Every time an Iranian mother talks to their son, their name is always followed by "joon," [جان] or "dear". And at the end of the conversation, it usually ends like this: "ghorbunet beram" [قربونت برام] . "I sacrifice myself for you". Nadia literally sacrifices herself for her son. That is the best part, for me, of this scene. If she were a real mob boss, she wouldn't get herself involved with this. But she is a housewife. She makes mistakes. That scene means so much to me. I've been asked, "Why does Nadia go there? She can send people to bring her son back". But she doesn't, because she calls her son "joon," "dear," and she is ready to sacrifice herself for him. Ghorbunet beram". With respect to Cobb's perspective on the scene, LeFranc and Farrell consulted with each other on maintaining the tone of the series throughout, and felt that the choice of "lingering and holding on Oz watching them" felt appropriate as it conveyed the violence of Cobb's character.

Michael Kelly explained Sofia's decision to kill Johnny, "Johnny would have been an asset for sure. But at the same time, it's the most baller move she could have made. She's got all the men in front of her. I gathered them all together with my power, right? And then she comes in, and she's like 'No, here's the power, here's the money, here's everything. You know, I'm gonna treat you fair. I'm gonna treat you right.' They're like 'Oh yeah, that's our new leader.' And pretty simple it was a baller move on her part".

With Dr. Rush aiding Sofia in her criminal empire, Lauren LeFranc hoped this could be a subversion of the gangster genre, explaining "We've seen so many gangster films where the way men treat women is very like, in a diminished way, I guess. And to me, it was interesting that Julian Rush could be somebody who admires Sofia and is in awe of her, but is the beta in this relationship, and Sofia knows it. I just don't think you've gotten to see that type of dynamic that often".

== Reception ==
=== Viewers ===
In its original American broadcast, "Homecoming" was seen by an estimated 0.385 million household viewers with a 0.09 in the 18–49 demographics. This means that 0.09 percent of all households with televisions watched the episode. This was a slight increase in viewership from the previous episode, which was seen by an estimated 0.368 million household viewers with a 0.09 in the 18–49 demographics.

=== Critical reviews ===
"Homecoming" received positive reviews from critics. The review aggregator website Rotten Tomatoes reported a 100% approval rating for the episode, with an average rating of 8/10 and based on 7 critic's reviews.

Tyler Robertson of IGN gave the episode a "great" 8 out of 10 and wrote in his verdict, "Though not afraid to tease more backstory to come, “Homecoming” finally ditches the past for a look ahead, as Oz puts in motion his long-laid plans for a city-wide takeover. The episode (and Oz himself) struggle to keep all the plates spinning, but it finally feels like The Penguin is getting to the action. The promise of the premiere is finally coming into view, and hopefully, with just three episodes left, it can stick the landing."

William Hughes of The A.V. Club gave the episode a "C+" grade and wrote, "We've asked, more than once while considering The Penguin, what kind of TV show it actually wants to be. Are we sitting down each week to a gritty prestige crime drama about a damaged personality imposing its raging insecurities onto the world? A Coen-esque, lightly comedic crime caper about an eternal bullshitter flop-sweating his way to success? A pulpy meditation on trauma? “Homecoming,” the series' fifth installment, doesn't answer these questions so much as it throws up its hands at the whole concept of picking a lane in the first place. “Fuck it, two shows!” it messily declares: Welcome to our double feature, then, Oz Cobb's Failure House and Sofia Falcone's Big Day."

Andy Andersen of Vulture gave the episode a 3 star rating out of 5 and wrote, "As we head into the final three chapters of the Cobb/Gigante saga, the table is well set for a riveting clash of indelible Gotham baddies. Here's where I must give credit to director Helen Shaver for approaching the previous episode and this one with a total command of the tone and iconography of the material. The Sunday night HBO crime caper aspect of the show remains mostly adequate and sometimes even inspired. But in its affection for its characters and tragic-pulp framing of them, The Penguin is shaping up to be a comic-book crime story worth its own weight in stacks and stacks of untraceable cash." Josh Rosenberg of Esquire wrote, "For the past four episodes of The Penguin, I've affectionately joked around about Farrell's take on the classic Batman villain. The half-Tony Soprano, half-Grimace caricature on my screen is easily the funniest performance I've seen in a long time. He waddles around, yells in a stereotypical Italian accent, and complains about deli sandwiches with lines like “So what, a normal amount of pickles is one?” But is there more to Oz Cobb? Can the Penguin truly touch my heart? In the way that only a Fast & Furious movie could ever me cry, episode 5 went straight for my very soul."

Joe George of Den of Geek gave the episode a 4 star rating out of 5 and wrote, "Whatever the reasoning, it's clear that the lines have been drawn and a new era has dawned in Gotham. By the time Oz reveals to Vic his secret lair, The Penguin has finally become the superhero show it was always meant to be. Now, let the fight begin." Nate Richard of Collider gave the episode a 9 out of 10 rating and wrote, ""Homecoming" never wastes a single second, requiring us to pay close attention to every single frame. However, it doesn't once feel too convoluted, as director Helen Shaver and writers Breannah Gibson and Shaye Ogbonna succeed at channeling the controlled yet tense atmosphere."

Lisa Babick of TV Fanatic gave the episode a 4.8 star rating out of 5 rating and wrote, "It's a significant choice for the writers and one that carries weight, particularly with those who know their mob history." Chris Gallardo of Telltale TV gave the episode a 4.5 star rating out of 5 rating and wrote, "What The Penguin Season 1 Episode 5, “Homecoming”, does results in a fascinating exploration of these power dynamics that are shifting. Given how Oz is manipulating each and every one of these characters, it'll be exciting to see how these details will line up with one another."
