= Gold Summit =

- The Penguin episode
- Episode no.: Episode 6
- Directed by: Kevin Bray
- Written by: Nick Towne
- Cinematography by: David Franco
- Editing by: Henk Van Eeghen
- Original air date: October 27, 2024
- Running time: 53 minutes

Guest appearances
- François Chau as Feng Zhao; Rhys Coiro as Councilman Sebastian Hady

Episode chronology
← Previous "Homecoming"	Next → "Top Hat"

"Gold Summit" is the sixth episode of the American crime drama television miniseries The Penguin, a spin-off from the film The Batman. The episode was written by producer Nick Towne and directed by Kevin Bray. It was first broadcast on HBO in the United States on October 27, 2024, and also was available on Max on the same date.

Set shortly after the events of the film, the series explores the rise to power of Oswald "Oz" Cobb / Penguin (portrayed by Colin Farrell) in Gotham City's criminal underworld. Oz finds himself allied with a young man named Victor (Rhenzy Feliz), while also having to deal with the presence of Sofia Falcone (Cristin Milioti), who wants answers regarding her brother's disappearance. In the episode, Oz and Victor continue rebuilding their Bliss empire, while Sofia and Salvatore Maroni (Clancy Brown) try to find Oz's whereabouts.

According to Nielsen Media Research, the episode was seen by an estimated 0.324 million household viewers and gained a 0.08 ratings share among adults aged 18–49. The episode received positive reviews from critics, who praised the performances, emotional tone, and ending.

== Plot ==
With the two remaining buckets of Bliss, Oz reorganizes his criminal empire in the underground railway. Some time later, the Bliss business has picked up steam, with major gangs involved in its distribution. Nevertheless, Victor begins to worry about possible repercussions if their base of operations is discovered.

Sal has moved in with Sofia at her mansion, as they prepare to establish their next move against Oz. While Sofia believes the Triads will remain loyal to her, Sal is certain that they will side with Oz due to the Bliss. To send a message, Sofia's henchmen murder some of Oz's distributors and publicly hang them. Oz decides that instead of leaving it with the other gangs, he assigns his crew to drop Bliss all around town for free. Sofia and Sal break into Oz's apartment, but find nothing valuable, as he has no known relatives. While checking his bedroom, Sofia finds a signed photo of Eve.

Francis' dementia continues worsening, staying hours in cold water in the bathtub until Oz arrives to take her out. Francis makes Oz promise that he will help in letting her die before her condition becomes too severe, which he reluctantly agrees to. Hating that the neighborhood, Crown Point, is out of power, Oz threatens Councilman Sebastian Hady into restoring it. Victor is approached by Squid, a gang member who initially tasked him in stealing Oz's car rims, who wants to take part of his drug operation. Victor tells Squid that there is no room for him in their operations, prompting Squid to turn aggressive and demand to meet with Oz, threatening to expose them if he does not. Victor seemingly complies, but instead shoots him in the neck, killing him. A shaken Victor informs Oz that the problem was solved, and despite not saying that he killed him, Oz quickly understands that he did and tells him he did the right thing.

Sofia visits Eve at her apartment, and despite holding her at gunpoint, Eve is not afraid of her, as she actually led Sofia to her to protect the other prostitutes. Eve will not disclose anything about Oz, and that Oz himself would not rescue her regardless. Sofia then reveals that Oz was complicit with Carmine in the murders of the young women Sofia was blamed for as "the Hangman". Sofia spares her; prompting Eve to finally reveal that he is hiding in Crown Point. Oz sets up a meeting named "Gold Summit" among all gang leaders of the city, asking them to cooperate in his fight against the Gigantes, the Maronis, and the upper elite. Zhao of the Triads is not convinced by Oz's leadership, due to his backstabbing nature, but Oz wins them over by revealing he killed Alberto Falcone, and that their complete control of the city will undermine the wealthy citizens. The electricity returns to Crown Point, alarming Francis. As Victor consoles her, they start dancing together, completely unaware that Sofia has broken into the apartment with a crowbar.

== Production ==
=== Development ===
The episode was written by producer Nick Towne and directed by Kevin Bray. It marked Towne's first writing credit, and Bray's first directing credit.

=== Writing ===
Series creator Lauren LeFranc explained that the episode would include a time jump to properly advance the Bliss operation into the main storylines, "I think the way we ended [episode] five where Oz and Victor go down and Oz tells Victor about the tunnels, and we see this meaningful potential underground layer for him. It felt right to then jump ahead and see it in action, and then also it just gives story-wise, all of our characters some breathing room".

On Victor's decision to kill Squid, Rhenzy Feliz explained, "I think he goes into it totally thinking that the money play is gonna work, and then I think it's a heat-of-the-moment thing where there's not much time to make a decision but [he thinks] 'what the consequences could be if you let him come back?' So without really having much time to think, you gotta make a decision, and I think before he knows what he's doing, he's doing it, which I thought was really exciting the way that when I read it, I thought it was really cool". He also added, "it was definitely a conscious decision to have this arc from him being who he is at the beginning to who he is at the end and kind of having the confidence to do some of the things that he does".

Cristin Milioti explained Sofia's decision to spare Eve, "Clearly, Sofia's body count at this point in the show is so many. But she still has a very specific code of villain ethics. She can't be responsible for taking the life of someone in the way that she was accused of. It's almost like Tony Soprano with the Ducks. She spares a child. She won't engage in the type of murder that she was accused of, especially when she connects with someone. But then when it comes to her family, other people on the show, it's not even a thought".

== Reception ==
=== Viewers ===
In its original American broadcast, "Gold Summit" was seen by an estimated 0.324 million household viewers with a 0.08 in the 18–49 demographics. This means that 0.08 percent of all households with televisions watched the episode. This was a 16% decrease in viewership from the previous episode, which was seen by an estimated 0.385 million household viewers with a 0.09 in the 18–49 demographics.

=== Critical reviews ===
"Gold Summit" received positive reviews from critics. The review aggregator website Rotten Tomatoes reported a 100% approval rating for the episode, with an average rating of 8.1/10 and based on 9 critic's reviews.

Tyler Robertson of IGN gave the episode an "okay" 6 out of 10 and wrote in his verdict, "Even when it feels like it’s spinning its wheels, The Penguin still has enough juice to squeeze captivating moments out of its characters. Victor and Eve are confronted with the consequences of being connected to Oz, gaining a good helping of complexity in the process. But while “Gold Summit” does necessary work to drive towards the endgame battle between Oz and Sofia, the seemingly never-ending sense of buildup has me impatiently waiting for the inevitable climax."

William Hughes of The A.V. Club gave the episode a "B+" grade and wrote, "It's possible, on reflection, that this is The Penguin operating as it's intended to: a tense, quick-moving drama that milks genuine unease out of the damaged personalities at its core. (The episode's most emotionally unsettling moment has nothing to do with mob shenanigans or implied threats, and comes instead as Oz and Vic get into a queasy sibling rivalry about how best to keep Francis happy.) But it continues to fail to make its case that The Penguin himself is a figure worthy of this level of TV scrutiny. Interesting things happen here, interesting scenes are created, interesting performances deployed. But is this an interesting story? Jury's still out, which is rough news with just two episodes left to go."

Andy Andersen of Vulture gave the episode a 4 star rating out of 5 and wrote, "It's hardly a spoiler to point out that The Penguin is about Oz Cobb's rise to power, and “Gold Summit” shows us what'll get him to the top of the Gotham heap in the end. Every crumbling institution of the city — from the halls of justice to the backrooms of Crown Point — is a pressure point that demands attention. And Oz knows you have to work them all to rule them all." Josh Rosenberg of Esquire wrote, "The gangs accept. They drink to their new business partner and to “taking back Gotham.” But there's no rest for the wicked — Sofia finds Oz's mother."

Joe George of Den of Geek gave the episode a 4 star rating out of 5 and wrote, "When it admits that it's a show about Batman characters, The Penguin shows that supervillains are people too, and interesting, compelling ones at that." Nate Richard of Collider gave the episode a 9 out of 10 rating and wrote, "Sure, the whole "Eat the Rich" storyline has been done to death in recent years, but it's always had strong ties to the mythology of Batman. We've become accustomed to stories in Gotham where Bruce Wayne sulks around his mansion. By comparison, The Penguin is successfully able to paint a portrait not just of one of the Caped Crusader's biggest foes, but also of those underrepresented groups. We've always known Gotham is a city in shambles, but The Penguin succeeds in showing us why it is the way that it is."

Lisa Babick of TV Fanatic gave the episode a 4 star rating out of 5 rating and wrote, "His whole “haves and have-nots” speech felt like an attempt by the writers to inject some social commentary, but it didn't quite fit, even if it aimed to show Oz at his manipulative best. The message came off as forced, an attempt at depth that didn’t really land in the gritty world of high-stakes crime. After all, these are crime lords, not low-level street thugs." Chris Gallardo of Telltale TV gave the episode a 4.5 star rating out of 5 rating and wrote, "Though “Bliss” gave us insight into Victor's tragic backstory and how he'd eventually get involved with Oz, “Gold Summit” puts him at the forefront of things. At this point, he thinks he's above the old system, but this episode actually gives him that needed push."
