= After Hours (The Penguin) =

- The Penguin episode
- Episode no.: Episode 1
- Directed by: Craig Zobel
- Written by: Lauren LeFranc
- Cinematography by: Darran Tiernan
- Editing by: Henk Van Eeghen
- Original air date: September 19, 2024
- Running time: 67 minutes

Episode chronology
← Previous —	Next → "Inside Man"

"After Hours" is the series premiere of the American crime drama television miniseries The Penguin, a spin-off from the film The Batman. The episode was written by series creator Lauren LeFranc, and directed by executive producer Craig Zobel. It was first broadcast on HBO in the United States on September 19, 2024, and also was available on Max on the same date.

Set shortly after the events of the film, the series explores the rise to power of Oswald "Oz" Cobb / Penguin (portrayed by Colin Farrell) in Gotham City's criminal underworld. Oz finds himself allied with a young man named Victor (Rhenzy Feliz), while also having to deal with the presence of Sofia Falcone (Cristin Milioti), who wants answers regarding her brother's disappearance.

According to Nielsen Media Research, the episode was seen by an estimated 0.242 million household viewers and gained a 0.06 ratings share among adults aged 18–49. The episode received positive reviews from critics, who praised the performances (particularly Farrell and Milioti), directing, tone, production design and make-up.

== Plot ==
One week after the seawall explosion in Gotham City, (Note: As depicted in The Batman.) the city experiences a severe crime wave while rumors spread that Alberto Falcone, son of deceased crime boss Carmine Falcone, is poised to take over the family business.

Oswald "Oz" Cobb / Penguin recovers a stash of Falcone's valuables from the Iceberg Lounge, including blackmail material and jewels, but is caught by Alberto. Oz convinces him that they are on the same side, and have a sit down to some drinks and drugs. Alberto discusses his plan to rebuild his father's empire, involving a new drug that has the potential to replace Drops as the main family's business. When Oz lets out his dream of becoming a respected figure in the underworld, Alberto, in a mix of paranoia and mockery, belittles and insults him. Impulsively, Oz shoots him dead.

As he leaves to dispose of Alberto's body, Oz finds a gang trying to rob the rims of his car and starts shooting at them. Only one of them, Victor Aguilar, is left behind. Noticing his stutter, Oz spares and forces Victor to drive him around the city for multiple errands. In the morning, they drop Alberto's body in an unused car in a dump, and Oz takes from his pinky a ring that previously was owned by Salvatore Maroni, Carmine's rival. He lets Vic convince him that he has potential and begins to employ him as his driver.

Oz meets with Johnny Viti, the underboss of the Falcone crime family. He is informed that Oz's drug operation will move to another part of Gotham, and despite Oz's protests, the decision is final. Attempting to save his position in the organization, Oz begins to pitch Alberto's plan as his own, but he is interrupted by the arrival of Falcone's daughter, Sofia, known to the public as "the Hangman", a serial killer, and who has just been released from Arkham Asylum. It is implied that Oswald had a hand in her internment by denouncing her over to her father. Suspicious, she invites Oz over for lunch at a fancy restaurant and reveals that she was in on Alberto's project and interrogates him over her brother's disappearance. Oz tries to slither his way out by feigning ignorance and claiming he had Alberto's trust but was not informed about Sofia's part in the plan. She obviously does not believe him but leaves to investigate further.

He later gets Victor to accompany him to visit his mother, Francis, who suffers from early on-set of dementia. He confesses to murdering Alberto and tries to get her to leave Gotham City with him, but his mother chides him and convinces him that killing Alberto was only the first step to his rise in the criminal underworld. Inspired, Oz forms up a plan of his own. He visits the Blackgate Penitentiary to talk with Sal Maroni. He offers to work as a double agent and help him destroy Falcone's criminal empire, but Maroni is unwilling to trust so easily. Before he leaves, Oz returns his ring to him.

While driving back from Blackgate, Oz is spotted by Sofia, who gives chase. He tries to lose her henchmen in the street but is caught and knocked unconscious. He is taken to the Falcone mansion, where Sofia reveals she captured Calvin (Victor's friend), one of the kids who tried to steal the rims of Oz's car the night Alberto disappeared, who implicates him. Oz adamantly lies and gets the boy killed, but he is nonetheless stripped and tortured, while Sofia demands to know Alberto's whereabouts. Suddenly, a car crashes into the garden, and Sofia opens the trunk to find Alberto's corpse, his pinky cut and the word "Payback" scratched on the hatch. Oz is released and reunites with Victor, having secretly framed Maroni for Alberto's murder. As Oz and Victor drink slushies together, Oz reiterates his plan to take over the Falcone crime family, inviting Victor to be a part of his plan, which Victor accepts.

== Production ==
=== Development ===
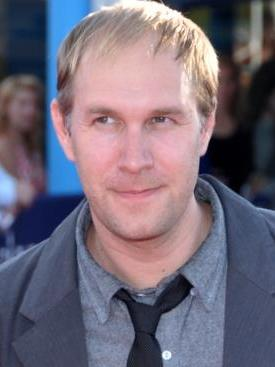
Executive producer Craig Zobel directed the episode.

The episode was written by series creator Lauren LeFranc, and directed by executive producer Craig Zobel. Zobel's involvement was confirmed in October 2022, when he was confirmed to direct the first episode.

=== Writing ===
When writing the episode, Craig Zobel focused on ensuring continuity with Matt Reeves' The Batman (2022) and establishing the narrative for the first three episodes. "After Hours" focuses on Oz Cobb, with Zobel's intention being to write the episode from a grounded perspective, citing John Cassavetes’ Killing of a Chinese Bookie (1976) and Gordon Parks' photography as inspiring the overall noir tone and depiction of structural inequalities. Michael Zegen explained that Alberto Falcone's death was a key point in Sofia's story arc, "I think that really pushed her over the edge and leads to what she becomes. They had such a close relationship and I feel like he was her rock and, vice versa, where does she go from here? She has nobody now".

The character of Victor Aguilar was created to build a dynamic with Oz. Lauren LeFranc mentioned the similarities between their different disabilities, "I wanted both of them to have that connection without it becoming something they speak about all the time, just as many of us have different things we all struggle with, and it doesn't shape everything that we are, but it's part of it". She also added, "In our grounded criminal world, realistically, young men are brought up and are taught to be violent in the mob. That's part of it; it's that grooming culture. And so Oz really is grooming Victor in a lot of ways, and I was interested in telling a story like that".

With the ending, LeFranc wanted to prove how smart and calculated Oz could be, hoping it would display he was "very inventive in his violence and his ambition". She also did not want to end with a cliffhanger, "I wanted to set the tone for the audience for the kind of show we wanted to be. A guy like Oz can do all this incredible violence. This woman can torture him, and then, at the end of the day, he can still sit and have a slushie and seemingly be unaffected. And that makes him a very strange character, and I wanted to showcase that".

=== Make-up ===
Mike Marino, who worked as the prosthetics designer in The Batman, reprised his duties for the series. For the scene where Oz is tortured, Farrell was required to wear all his make-up, and wear "a velcro piece to stick on, and a nice retro bush" to be "anatomically correct". Farrell said, "I felt incredibly exposed, even though I was anything but. I was totally covered, but I was covered by a naked man. And it's not like I thought I was him, but it had a very strange effect on my ego".

=== Music ===
The crew wanted an "embarrassing" song to use for the scene where Oz gets Victor in his car after arriving in the subway train. The scene was filmed without a specific song in mind, and the crew later considered many options. They subsequently settled on "9 to 5" by Dolly Parton, with Craig Zobel explaining, "Maybe he had that tape, and, you know, he grew up really loving Dolly Parton. He wouldn't want Victor to know that while he's trying to be tough and scary character. It was the right mix, it seemed like".

== Reception ==
=== Viewers ===
In its original American broadcast, "After Hours" was seen by an estimated 0.242 million household viewers with a 0.06 in the 18–49 demographics. This means that 0.06 percent of all households with televisions watched the episode.

=== Critical reviews ===
"After Hours" received positive reviews from critics. The review aggregator website Rotten Tomatoes reported a 100% approval rating for the episode, with an average rating of 8.3/10 and based on 13 critic's reviews.

Tyler Robertson of IGN gave the episode a "great" 8 out of 10 and wrote in his verdict, "The premiere of The Penguin recaptures the melancholy atmosphere of The Batman while drawing out more of what made Colin Farrell's portrayal of Oswald Cobb so captivating. And it promises to expand on those qualities even further. Its TV-sized budget is noticeable, but doesn't detract from the well plotted introduction to this behind-the-scenes look at the mobster families of Gotham City and the rise of Oz Cobb."

William Hughes of The A.V. Club gave the episode a "B" grade and wrote, "Director Craig Zobel has done a fine enough job of recreating the basic look of The Batman, all grainy sunlight and amber streetlights, but the show itself is so disinterested in anything to do with its source material that the connection feels largely academic. Farrell and Milioti remain compelling, but if — as the show promises — The Penguin is on the rise, we can't quite grasp that trajectory just yet." Nate Richard of Collider gave the episode a 9 out of 10 rating and wrote, "This series isn't just trying to do the same thing that Reeves did with The Batman, and the introductory episode proves that The Penguin isn't just another story about gangsters."

Andy Andersen of Vulture gave the episode a 4 star rating out of 5 and wrote, "Under the careful narrative direction of showrunner Lauren LeFranc, The Penguin casts Colin Farrell's Oswald Cobb in a monstrous (but recognizably human) “rise to power” arch that feels as comfortable presented alongside the HBO crime-drama canon as it does such DC villain-centered fare as Peacemaker or Harley Quinn." Josh Rosenberg of Esquire wrote, "This kind of lucky exit happens over and over again throughout The Penguin, forcing you to question why anyone keeps Oz waddling around. It's a good thing they do. He's no Yojimbo, but his ability to play both sides and trip up the criminal ladder makes for entertaining television. No matter how many stupid and awful choices the Penguin makes, I have a feeling I'm going to like this guy."

Joe George of Den of Geek gave the episode a 3 star rating out of 5 and wrote, "With its close-ups and backstory concerns, The Penguin suffocates Farrell and renders his performance embarrassing. When surrounded by actors giving naturalistic performances, the growling and waddling and sneering feels out of place, as if Oz is a comic book character who wandered into a realistic crime drama. Which, of course, he is." Sean T. Collins of Decider wrote, "You could spend this time watching The Sopranos, The Wire, Boardwalk Empire, something about urban crime that isn't also about characters refurbished from children's comics, awkwardly shoehorned into a show where people are stripped nude and have their armpits sliced by piano wire. Alternately, you could simply watch a story about Batman characters that actually has Batman in it — the iconic superhero who puts on a scary black outfit and fights crime committed by Lewis Carroll characters. Instead, you have The Penguin, and it's neither fish nor fowl."
