= Cent'Anni =

- The Penguin episode
- Episode no.: Episode 4
- Directed by: Helen Shaver
- Written by: John McCutcheon
- Cinematography by: Jonathan Freeman
- Editing by: Meg Reticker
- Original air date: October 13, 2024
- Running time: 59 minutes

Guest appearance
- Aria Shahghasemi as Taj Maroni

Episode chronology
← Previous "Bliss"	Next → "Homecoming"

"Cent'Anni" (Note: Cent'anni is an Italian toast (pronounced [ˌtʃɛnˈtanni]) meaning "[may he/she/you live for] one hundred years".) is the fourth episode of the American crime drama television miniseries The Penguin, a spin-off from the film The Batman. The episode was written by supervising producer John McCutcheon, and directed by Helen Shaver. It was first broadcast on HBO in the United States on October 13, 2024, and also was available on Max on the same date.

The series, set shortly after the events of the film, explores the rise to power of Oswald "Oz" Cobb / Penguin (portrayed by Colin Farrell) in Gotham City's criminal underworld. Oz finds himself allied with a young man named Victor (Rhenzy Feliz), while also having to deal with the presence of Sofia Falcone (Cristin Milioti), who wants answers regarding her brother's disappearance. In the episode, Sofia's past is explored, detailing her relationship with her father Carmine (Mark Strong) and subsequent imprisonment in Arkham Asylum.

According to Nielsen Media Research, the episode was seen by an estimated 0.368 million household viewers and gained a 0.09 ratings share among adults aged 18–49. The episode received highly positive reviews from critics, with Milioti receiving widespread acclaim for her performance in the episode.

== Plot ==
After intercepting Oz and Sofia outside the nightclub, (Note: As depicted in "Bliss".) Nadia Maroni exposes Oz's duplicity, which includes murdering Alberto, to Sofia. Oz pleads for his life, claiming he was only using Sofia to gain access to Bliss. When Victor arrives and hits Maroni's henchmen with the car, Oz escapes with him, leaving a wounded Sofia behind. She calls Dr. Rush for help before collapsing from her wounds.

In flashbacks, Sofia discovers the body of her mother, Isabella, who appears to have hanged herself. Years later, Sofia heads a foundation named in honor of her mother and is friendly with Oz, who is her driver. While leaving a charity event, Sofia is approached by a reporter, Summer Gleeson, who tells her that several women who worked at the Iceberg Lounge died of apparent suicides, just as Isabella did. Sofia refuses to get involved.

Sofia's father, Carmine, expresses pride in her and hopes she can succeed him as crime boss instead of her brother. She asks him about her mother's death, but Carmine maintains that it was a suicide. Summer continues asking Sofia for help in gaining access to Carmine's clubs, asserting that the wounds in Isabella's neck are evidence of murder. Sofia begins to recall other details that point to her mother having been murdered.

Carmine confronts Sofia over her meetings with Summer, revealing that Oz informed on her and that she is part of a police investigation into the hanging deaths. Carmine is a suspect. When Sofia notes that his hands were hurt on the day she found her mother's corpse, Carmine dismisses her and orders Oz to drive her home. On the way, they are pulled over by William Kenzie (Peter McDonald) and other police officers, who arrest Sofia for the murder of the women, Summer included.

She is sent to Arkham Asylum for six months while awaiting trial, earning the nickname of "The Hangman," in the press. She is brutalized by other inmates and subjected to electroshock therapy by her doctor, Ventris. Nevertheless, Ventris's associate, Dr. Rush, is skeptical that Sofia truly committed the crimes. Six months later, Alberto visits Sofia, informing her that Ventris convinced the judge that Sofia was not competent to stand trial, confining her to Arkham indefinitely. Reaching her breaking point, Sofia kills Magpie, a fellow inmate, before being sedated.

In the present day, Sofia awakens in Rush's house. She insinuates that Rush is motivated by romantic feelings for her, instead of morality or altruism. She then laments her situation, and how she has no allies, but comes to realize that the world itself is broken instead of her. Sofia then goes to her family home, where Luca is presiding over a family dinner, and condemns her relatives for refusing to help her and instead writing letters claiming she was criminally insane to keep her in Arkham. That night, she secretly escorts Gia, daughter of her cousin Carla, out of the mansion and they sleep in the greenhouse. In the morning, Sofia returns to the house, where she has released a gas that killed everyone inside overnight. Armed with a pistol, she wakes the only survivor, Johnny Viti, telling him they must talk.

== Production ==
=== Development ===
The episode was written by supervising producer John McCutcheon and directed by Helen Shaver. It marked McCutcheon's first writing credit, and Shaver's first directing credit. Showrunner Lauren LeFranc brought in Shaver after working with her on the series Impulse, with Shaver commenting "Once I'd read episode four, I was just like, 'okay, I'm doing this.' I so understood the journey to the primal trauma and the unraveling of this woman, her rebirth".

=== Writing ===
Showrunner Lauren LeFranc explained that she liked an episode wherein the main storyline would take a pause to properly focus on a specific character. She said, "If you're engaging the audience properly, people should be willing to go on a ride with you". Despite the irony of sidelining Oz in the episode, she felt it was important to understand Sofia's story "so you can understand Oz psychologically". LeFranc based Sofia's arc on Rosemary Kennedy, "the "forgotten" or "hidden" sister of President John F. Kennedy. After being lobotomized by her own father, she was left permanently incapacitated, unable to speak, and institutionalized for over 60 years. LeFranc commented, "With the history of mental institutions, usually someone would say a woman's 'hysterical', and we don't really know what that equates to, and then they would put her away".

Cristin Milioti was surprised by the episode's content, describing it as "a full-course meal, and they don't come around all the time". She added, "To get to do all that in one hour, I was beside myself. It's like a movie. You get to see her in all those different stages of how she's pushed to madness". She was enthusiastic to explore her character's stay in Arkham Asylum, explaining "When they put that neckpiece on me that gets chained to my waist and you're in those orange stripes and you see the stamp on the uniform that says 'Arkham Asylum', I freaked out". Milioti also considered that the episode can be interpreted as Sofia accepting herself for who she is, "She finally can breathe and she's finally become the thing that everyone said she was. They did this to her and she becomes it. She goes mad and I love that that's how it goes even though it's so brutal".

=== Casting ===
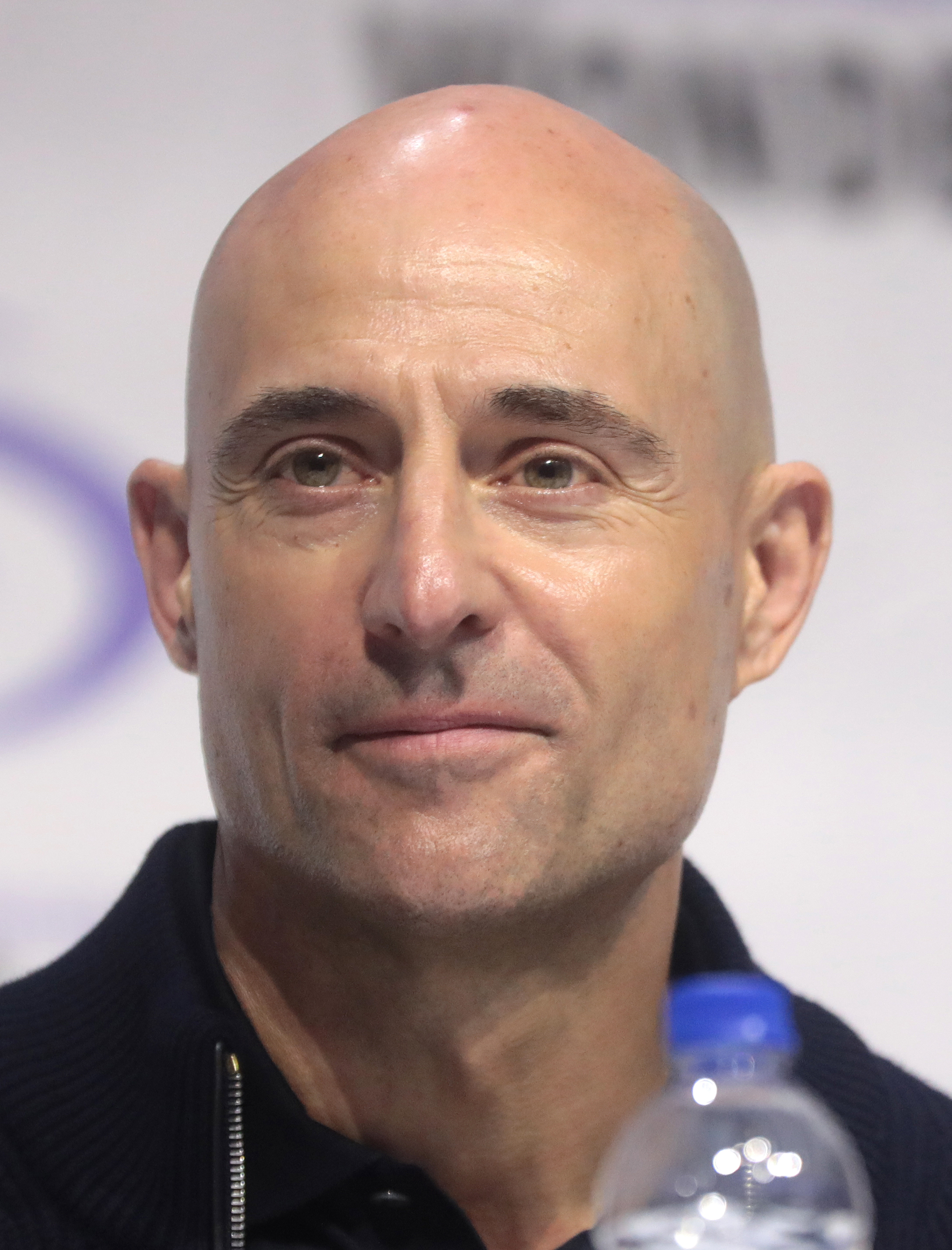
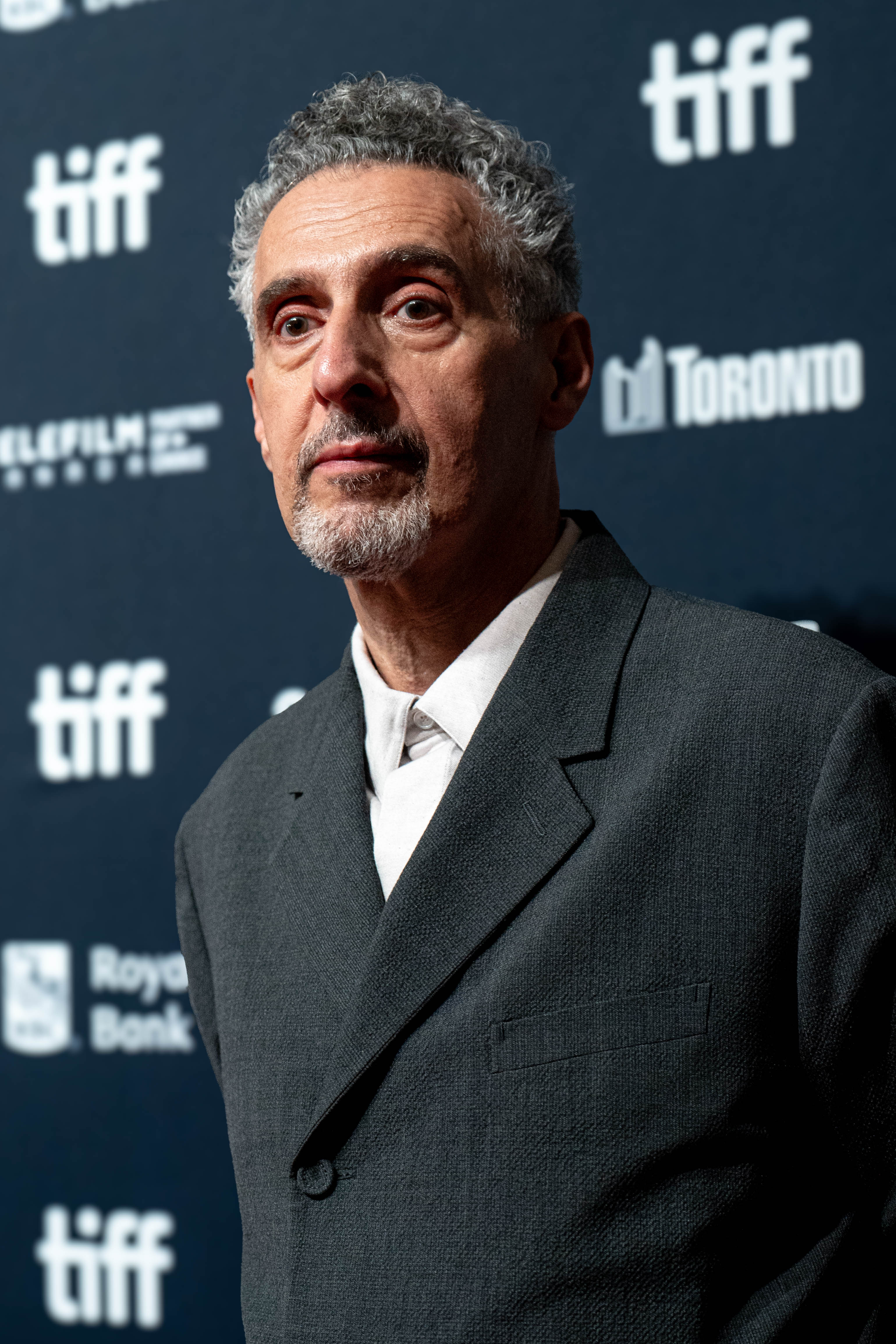
Mark Strong portrays Carmine Falcone in the episode, replacing John Turturro.

In September 2024, it was confirmed that Mark Strong would play Carmine Falcone in flashback sequences, replacing John Turturro, who portrayed the character in the film The Batman. LeFranc explained that Turturro was unavailable due to scheduling conflicts, but felt that the "gravitas that Mark brings" would justify the recasting. However, the following month, Turturro explained that his decision to not return was based on the series' depiction of violence against women, "I did what I wanted to with the role. In the show, there was a lot of violence towards women, and that's not my thing". While the character used similar tactics in the film, the scenes were depicted off-screen.

LeFranc also explained that the different versions would still feel like the same character, "They're similar ages, but a little bit younger. You'd have to ask Mark, but I think he did look at the portrayal and the accent [in The Batman]. I keep using the word gravitas, but it was very important that he has a presence, certainly with Sofia, that there's a hint of warmth, but also something very cold at his center. It felt cohesive to me in watching him. It felt to me like that is her father".

== Reception ==
=== Viewers ===
In its original American broadcast, "Cent'Anni" was seen by an estimated 0.368 million household viewers with a 0.09 in the 18–49 demographics. This means that 0.09 percent of all households with televisions watched the episode. This was a slight increase in viewership from the previous episode, which was seen by an estimated 0.365 million household viewers with a 0.07 in the 18–49 demographics.

=== Critical reviews ===
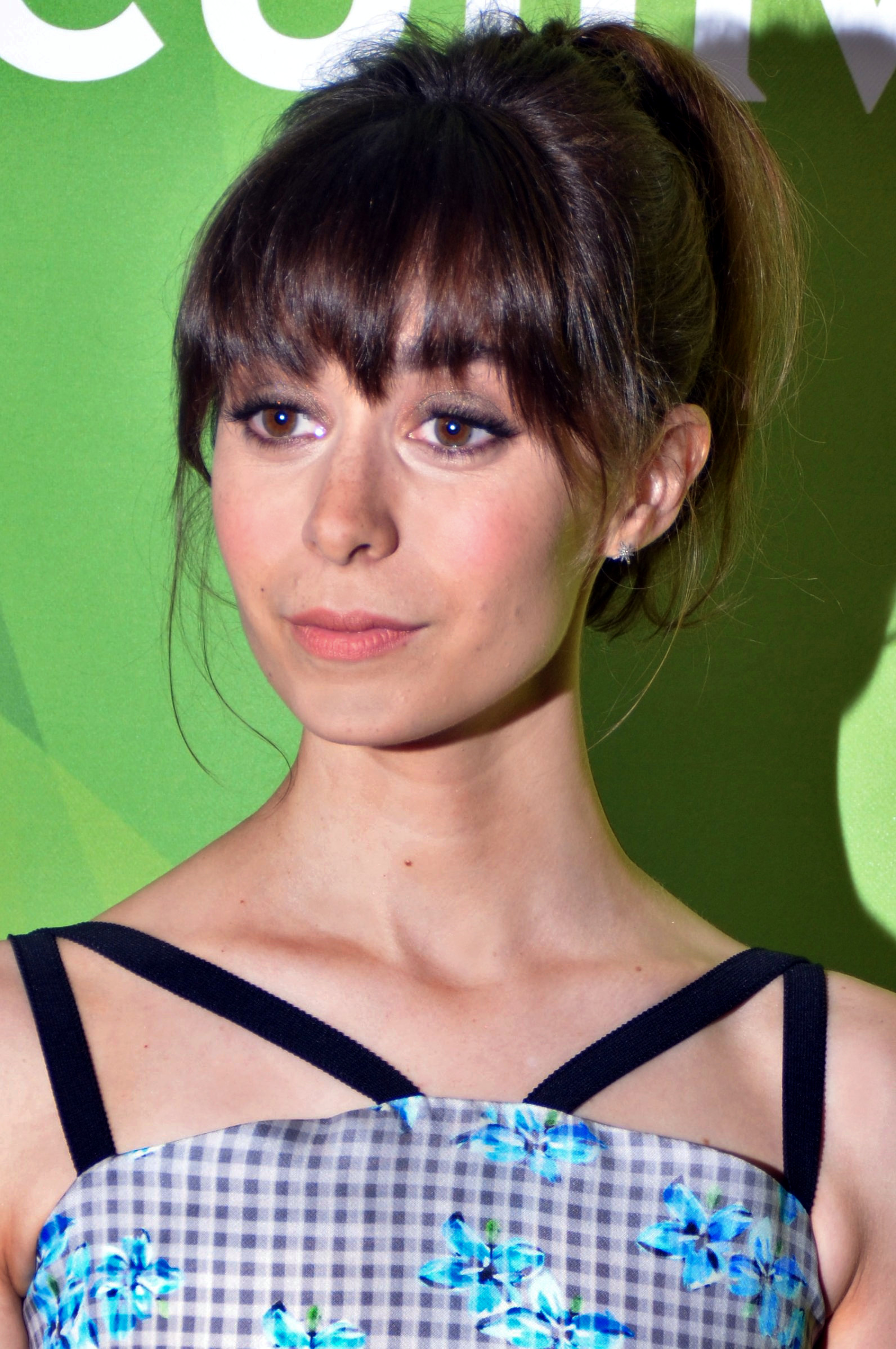
Cristin Milioti's performance in the episode received critical acclaim.

"Cent'Anni" received highly positive reviews from critics, with Cristin Milioti's performance earning her significant acclaim. The review aggregator website Rotten Tomatoes reported a 100% approval rating for the episode, with an average rating of 8.9/10 and based on 10 critic's reviews.

Tyler Robertson of IGN gave the episode a "good" 7 out of 10 and wrote in his verdict, "On its own, “Cent'anni” is a well-executed episode of television that gets to the heart of Sofia's arc and drums up a ton of sympathy for her, which justifies its departure from the realistic, gritty mob story The Penguin has told thus far. It's just that its placement within the series feels clunky – a second consecutive flashback episode with even less time for Oz's plot to progress feels like a last-chance effort to shoehorn in this part of the story before halftime. So while it has some of the series' best moments so far (namely that ending sequence) thanks to Cristin Millioti, it feels like it's time to get back to the action, and I'm getting impatient."

William Hughes of The A.V. Club gave the episode a "B+" grade and wrote, "It's an episode of very high highs married to some extremely discombobulating lows. Milioti remains excellent throughout; her grasp of Sofia is what keeps the episode working as it makes its various gigantic plot moves. On a gut level, it hits hard — even as the brain frequently intervenes a few moments later with a series of incredulous "Yeah, buts." If nothing else, it feels like The Penguin has finally gotten to a story it wants to tell — the irony being that it basically had to jettison its title character to get there."

Andy Andersen of Vulture gave the episode a 4 star rating out of 5 and wrote, "The Hangman was the illusion of a monster, created by a monster to absorb the fallout of his monstrous deeds. Rather than remain the monster that her family made of her, Sofia mutates into a triumphant manifestation of her own wrath and the wrath of the women her father killed. In Gotham City, you either die the victim or live long enough to see yourself become the criminal of the week." Josh Rosenberg of Esquire wrote, "Episode 4 is Sofia's story. It's a master class of New Jersey Italian Mafia family acting from Milioti — and dare I say, she just vaulted herself into the Emmy conversation. Even though it barely features ol' Oz Cobb, it's the best episode of The Penguin yet."

Joe George of Den of Geek gave the episode a perfect 5 star rating out of 5 and wrote, "More than revealing that Sofia is not actually a murderer, "Cent'Anni" fleshes out her relationship to her family and to Oz. Where previous episodes told us about the bond she shared with Alberto, here we see it in everything from their joking rapport to his desperation to set her free." Nate Richard of Collider gave the episode a perfect 10 out of 10 rating and wrote, "Storylines about gang wars, rats, and drug-running all take a backseat as "Cent'anni" narrows in on what the series has been doing best: its character work. It's going to be hard for the remaining four episodes of The Penguin to top this, but if this is any indication, we're in for a wild and satisfying ride."

Lisa Babick of TV Fanatic gave the episode a perfect 5 star rating out of 5 rating and wrote, "It would be the ultimate twist to see Oz fall — the Penguin to be no more! But in the Batman universe, that's a hard pill to swallow. Whether Sofia can survive and take him out remains to be seen, but one thing's for sure: the showdown is just beginning." Chris Gallardo of Telltale TV gave the episode a 4.5 star rating out of 5 rating and wrote, "The Penguin Season 1 Episode 4, "Cent'anni", might be the show's most captivating episode yet by placing its focus on Sofia Falcone and her transformation into the cold mastermind she is."

=== Accolades ===
TVLine named Cristin Milioti the "Performer of the Week" for the week of October 19, 2024, for her performance in the episode. The site wrote, "Milioti has been fantastic on The Penguin from the start, ensuring we believe Sofia Falcone is a more than capable foil for Oz Cobb. However, the show's fourth episode was entirely Sofia-focused and suffice to say, Milioti was very much up to the challenge, proving once again what a powerhouse performer she is."
