= Inside Man (The Penguin) =

- The Penguin episode
- Episode no.: Episode 2
- Directed by: Craig Zobel
- Written by: Erika L. Johnson
- Cinematography by: Darran Tiernan
- Editing by: Meg Reticker
- Original air date: September 29, 2024
- Running time: 56 minutes

Guest appearance
- Aria Shahghasemi as Taj Maroni

Episode chronology
← Previous "After Hours"	Next → "Bliss"

"Inside Man" is the second episode of the American crime drama television miniseries The Penguin, a spin-off from the film The Batman. The episode was written by co-executive producer Erika L. Johnson, and directed by executive producer Craig Zobel. It was first broadcast on HBO in the United States on September 29, 2024, and also was available on Max on the same date.

Set shortly after the events of the film, the series explores the rise to power of Oswald "Oz" Cobb / Penguin (portrayed by Colin Farrell) in Gotham City's criminal underworld. Oz finds himself allied with a young man named Victor (Rhenzy Feliz), while also having to deal with the presence of Sofia Falcone (Cristin Milioti), who wants answers regarding her brother's disappearance. In the episode, Oz cooperates with Salvatore Maroni's (Clancy Brown) crew to rob one of the Falcone's trucks, while Sofia's uncle Luca (Scott Cohen) arrives to take care of the crime family.

According to Nielsen Media Research, the episode was seen by an estimated 0.299 million household viewers and gained a 0.04 ratings share among adults aged 18–49. The episode received positive reviews from critics, who praised its performances, hijacking sequence and character development, although some expressed criticism for its pacing.

== Plot ==
Sofia undergoes therapy and suffers a panic attack after hallucinating Alberto's murder. She storms out of the therapist's office, intending to avenge her brother's death.

Oz visits Maroni again, who is angry over his actions. Oz defends his decisions and convinces Maroni to continue their partnership by helping with a drop shipment that will be taken by Maroni's crew. However, Oz is surprised when Johnny Viti appears and forces him to go in the armored truck instead of the car. Maroni's crew arrives and intercepts the truck, killing many of Falcone's henchmen. Oz barely escapes alive and claims his innocence to Viti. However, Sofia is certain that someone within their crew is cooperating with Maroni. Falcone's brother, Luca, is brought in to take Carmine's place as boss of the family and warns Sofia to stay out of their business.

Oz is called to his mother's house, after his landlord reports that her dementia has been worsening. Oz refuses to get her into permanent care and keeps paying him to stay with her. After Alberto's funeral, Sofia bribes retired GCPD detective Marcus Wise, formerly on her father's payroll, to investigate the heist, and the man finds Ervad, one of Maroni's henchmen. Maroni's wife, Nadia, assigns Oz to retrieve Ervad before they can get him to talk. Oz sneaks into the Falcone household, which is hosting the reception for Alberto's funeral. During this, Victor tries to sneak jewels inside Viti's car to expose his affair with Luca's wife but is forced to flee when Falcone's bodyguards see him.

Oz finds the basement where Ervad is kept, but upon being informed by Victor that he was seen, he is forced to kill Ervad with a switchblade. When Sofia and Luca find the corpse, they place the house in lockdown and force everyone assigned to the truck, including Oz, into a room. Oz plants the knife on Sofia's enforcer Castillo; Sofia tries to shoot him, but Luca intervenes and executes Castillo himself. Feeling that Sofia is clouded by her vendetta, Luca decides that she will be sent to Italy until their business is settled. That night, Oz makes Victor dig a grave for the bodies of Ervad and Castillo, warning him to stay focused or he will end up just like them. He is later called and meets with Sofia at the Falcone family crypt. She reveals that the stolen jewels were discovered in Castillo's apartment, after Oz had planted them there to correct Victor's earlier mistake, and asks Oz for a partnership to wipe out the Falcone family hierarchy so she may step in and take complete control.

== Production ==
=== Development ===
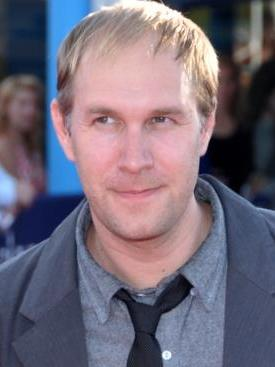
Executive producer Craig Zobel directed the episode.

The episode was written by co-executive producer Erika L. Johnson, and directed by executive producer Craig Zobel. It marked Johnson's first writing credit, and Zobel's second directing credit. Zobel's involvement was reported in October 2022, when he was confirmed to direct the first episode.

=== Filming ===
For the truck hijacking sequence, the crew only had two nights to film it. Zobel said that they "wanted to have something that felt a little bigger and a little more reflective of the character he is in the movie". The crew found a location below a bridge, and Zobel found the experience "hectic" while filming it. For the scenes where Oswald "Oz" Cobb / Penguin moves around the truck, Zobel said "we had the grip department and the special effects department put big long two-by-fours under the truck and just shake it up with that. Sometimes, the oldest ways work".

=== Post-production ===
The visual effects team had developed a type of flash prop gun for use on set during the FEMA heist scene, primarily to ensure the safety of the crew. The prop emulated the behavior of the real gun and the flashes of light from the trigger allowed the team to better enhance the effects during post.

== Reception ==
=== Viewers ===
In its original American broadcast, "Inside Man" was seen by an estimated 0.299 million household viewers with a 0.04 in the 18–49 demographics. This means that 0.04 percent of all households with televisions watched the episode. This was a 23% increase in viewership from the previous episode, which was seen by an estimated 0.242 million household viewers with a 0.06 in the 18–49 demographics.

=== Critical reviews ===
"Inside Man" received positive reviews from critics. The review aggregator website Rotten Tomatoes reported a 100% approval rating for the episode, with an average rating of 7.9/10 and based on 9 critic's reviews.

Tyler Robertson of IGN gave the episode a "good" 7 out of 10 and wrote in his verdict, "Oz thrusts himself (and those around him) down a winding path of misdirection and chaos in another solid episode of The Penguin. “Inside Man” loses some of the momentum of the series premiere, but a pair of tense sequences and knockout performances from the main cast keep it from falling flat."

William Hughes of The A.V. Club gave the episode a "B" grade and wrote, "there's fun to be had watching Cobb run the numbers on the various people he might pin his mole activities on, ultimately dismissing Michael Kelly's Johnny Vitti as just too damn hard to frame. But this is an episode of TV that's less about what's happening now than what's happening next, and the ultimate effect is leaving me less interested in what I just watched than what'll arrive next week."

Andy Andersen of Vulture gave the episode a 3 star rating out of 5 and wrote, "Our sophomore episode of The Penguin puts us through the first real phase of Oz Cobb's plan to takeover the Falcone Empire. If you're coming into this thing looking for a quality Sunday-night HBO crime show, the proceedings will prove efficient, if not underbaked. But where “Inside Man” may come off as paying thin gangster-cosplay lip service to its The Sopranos/Boardwalk Empire-baiting HBO time slot, The Penguin continues to make inspired use of the comic-book IP torch it's been tasked with carrying." Josh Rosenberg of Esquire wrote, "For starters, I already like the direction the series is taking, with the Penguin stumbling up the ladder of success. Does he have good ideas? Is he quick on his feet? None of those questions matter! The Penguin has luck on his side. He's the kind of guy who just spouts words until a threat on his life turns into a job opportunity. If you ever wonder throughout the series why no one simply kills the Penguin — trust me, they're trying."

Joe George of Den of Geek gave the episode a 4 star rating out of 5 and wrote, "As with the premiere, Milioti provides the perfect partner to Farrell as Oz, and every scene between the two characters crackles. By the time the episode ends with Sofia holding an unnerving smile as proposes a partnership with Oz, The Penguin starts to make a name for itself by embracing its pulpy heart." Sean T. Collins of Decider wrote, "With these characteristics, The Penguin does an excellent job conveying why an S-tier liar and killer like Oz Cobb isn't running Gotham City already. Thus far, his gifts have all been expended in a desperate scramble from the bottom to the, let's say, lower middle."

Nate Richard of Collider gave the episode an 8 out of 10 rating and wrote, "This week's installment may also not be as explosive as the first episode, but the pacing and structure keep The Penguin moving at the perfect speed, leaving us wanting more as soon as the end credits roll." Lisa Babick of TV Fanatic gave the episode a 4.5 star rating out of 5 rating and wrote, "Oz might want to rethink his “it's a helluva lot more fun to dance” line he tossed at Sofia Falcone on The Penguin Season 1 Episode 2 because the dance will only get more twisted."
