= The Penguin (TV series) =

2024 DC Studios miniseries

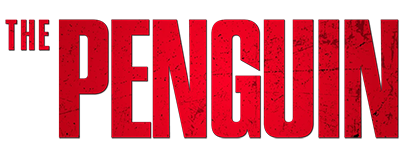
- Genre: Crime drama; Gangster; Superhero
- Based on: Characters by Bob Kane with Bill Finger
- Developed by: Lauren LeFranc
- Showrunner: Lauren LeFranc
- Starring: Colin Farrell; Cristin Milioti; Rhenzy Feliz; Deirdre O'Connell
- Music by: Mick Giacchino
- Country of origin: United States
- Original language: English
- No. of episodes: 8

Production
- Executive producers: Lauren LeFranc; Matt Reeves; Dylan Clark; Craig Zobel; Colin Farrell; Bill Carraro; Daniel Pipski
- Producers: Dana Robin; Nick Towne; Corina Maritescu; Claudine Farrell
- Production location: New York
- Cinematography: Darran Tiernan; Jonathan Freeman; David Franco; Zoë White
- Editors: Henk Van Eeghen; Meg Reticker; Andy Keir
- Running time: 47–68 minutes
- Production companies: Acid and Tender Productions; 6th & Idaho Motion Picture Company; Dylan Clark Productions; Chapel Place Productions; Zobot Projects; DC Studios; Warner Bros. Television

Original release
- Network: HBO
- Release: September 19 – November 10, 2024

Related
- The Batman (2022)

The Penguin is an American crime drama television miniseries developed by Lauren LeFranc for HBO. Based on the DC Comics character the Penguin, it serves as a spin-off from the 2022 film The Batman. Produced by DC Studios in association with Warner Bros. Television, the series follows Oz Cobb's rise to power in Gotham City's criminal underworld. LeFranc also serves as the showrunner of the series.

Colin Farrell stars as the titular character, reprising his role from The Batman, alongside Cristin Milioti, Rhenzy Feliz, Deirdre O'Connell, Clancy Brown, Carmen Ejogo, Michael Zegen, Berto Colón, Scott Cohen, Shohreh Aghdashloo, Theo Rossi, James Madio, Nadine Malouf, Joshua Bitton, David H. Holmes, Daniel J. Watts, Jared Abrahamson, Ben Cook, Jayme Lawson, Aleska Palladino, Craig Walker, Tess Soltau, Marié Botha, Michael Kelly, and Mark Strong.

Development on the series was underway by September 2021, and HBO Max ordered it in March 2022, after The Batman was released. The film's director, Matt Reeves, supervised the writing and was involved in hiring the creative team. Filming began in March 2023 in New York but was halted in June by the 2023 Hollywood labor disputes. Production resumed in late November and concluded in February 2024. The series moved from HBO Max's successor Max to HBO in July 2024. Craig Zobel directed the first three episodes, Helen Shaver and Kevin Bray directed two each, and Jennifer Getzinger directed the finale.

The Penguin was broadcast in the United States for eight episodes from September 19 to November 10, 2024. The series received critical acclaim for its performances, writing, direction, tone, and production value. It also received numerous accolades and was nominated for 24 Primetime Emmy Awards and three Golden Globe Awards, including wins for both Farrell and Milioti's performances.

== Premise ==
Following the events of The Batman (2022), the series explores the rise to power of Oz Cobb / The Penguin in Gotham City's criminal underworld.

== Cast and characters ==
=== Main ===
- Colin Farrell as Oswald "Oz" Cobb / The Penguin:
  A disfigured former underling of deceased crime boss Carmine Falcone, who was born with clubfoot, giving him a waddle-like gait, and is now on the rise to becoming a criminal kingpin in his own right. Farrell said the series would further explore the character's strength, awkwardness, and villainy as well as the "heartbroken man inside there" beyond his introduction in The Batman (2022). For the series, the character's surname is shortened to "Cobb" from "Cobblepot", the surname traditionally used in the comics, because the production found it to be a more plausible name. Ryder Allen portrays a young Oz.
- Cristin Milioti as Sofia Gigante (née Falcone):
  Carmine's daughter and a presumed psychopathic serial killer who, after being released from Arkham State Hospital, fights Oz for control of Gotham City's criminal underworld. Initially referred to as "Sofia Falcone", she later adopts her mother's surname "Gigante" to spite her father's memory.
- Rhenzy Feliz as Victor "Vic" Aguilar:
  A homeless teenager who becomes Oz's driver and personal enforcer. Victor's characterization incorporates elements from that of Jason Todd, the second character to assume the persona of Batman's sidekick Robin, but he is not a direct adaptation.
- Deirdre O'Connell as Francis Cobb: Oz's mother who has Parkinson's and Lewy body dementia. Emily Meade portrays a young Francis Cobb.

=== Recurring ===
- Michael Zegen as Alberto Falcone: Carmine's son and Sofia's older brother, who struggles with drug and alcohol addiction.
- Berto Colón as Castillo: An enforcer of the Falcone family loyal to Sofia.
- James Madio as Milos Grapa: The consigliere of the Falcone family and Carmine's former bodyguard.
- Michael Kelly as Johnny Viti: The underboss of the Falcone crime family and acting boss following Carmine's death.
- Mark Strong as Carmine Falcone:
  A deceased Gotham crime boss and the father of Sofia, Alberto, and Selina Kyle. Falcone appears through flashbacks, with Strong replacing The Batman actor John Turturro.
- Scott Cohen as Luca Falcone: Carmine's brother and former Caporegime who succeeds him as the boss of the Falcone crime family.
- Aleksa Palladino as Carla Viti: Johnny's younger sister and the mother of Gia.
- Kenzie Grey as Gia Viti: Carla's daughter.
- Theo Rossi as Dr. Julian Rush: A former psychiatrist at Arkham and Sofia's therapist and love interest.
- Craig Walker as Detective Marcus Wise: A corrupt detective working for Sofia in exchange for drugs.
- Tess Soltau as Tina Falcone: Luca's wife and Johnny's mistress.
- Myles Humphus as Dom: An enforcer for the Falcone family, and later to Sofia.
- Peter McDonald as Detective William Kenzie: A corrupt detective and enforcer for Carmine Falcone. McDonald reprises his role from The Batman.
- Clancy Brown as Salvatore "Sal" Maroni: The head of the Maroni Crime Family whose operation ended following a historic drug bust, in which Carmine was the informant.
- Shohreh Aghdashloo as Nadia Maroni: Salvatore's wife and the acting boss of the Maroni family.
- Aria Shahghasemi as Taj Maroni: The son of Salvatore and Nadia Maroni.
- Carmen Ejogo as Eve Karlo: A madam and Oz's lover, she is known for changing her appearance to suit her clients' desires. Her surname references Basil Karlo, the original Clayface.
- Joshua Bitton as Mikey Stone: An enforcer and street dealer for Oz.
- David H. Holmes as Nick Fuchs: An enforcer for Oz.
- Daniel J. Watts as Bruno Tess: One of Oz's loyal enforcers.
- Owen Asztalos as Jack Cobb: Oz's older brother.
- Nico Tirozzi as Benny Cobb: Oz's younger brother.
- Louis Cancelmi as Rex Calabrese: A gangster from Oz's youth whom he describes as a revered community figure.
- Eric Berryman as Dr. Desoto: A chemist at Oz's plant.
- Ade Otukoya (Note: Otukoya was also credited as a co-star in "Gold Summit".) as Zeke: One of Oz's enforcers.
- Alex Anagnostidis as Ray: A driver in Oz's crew.
- Ben Cook as Calvin: A street teenager and friend of Vic's.
- François Chau as Feng Zhao: Head of the Gotham Triads, a medium-sized gang with international connections that runs nightclubs and casinos. He is referred to as "the Dai Lo" ("Big Brother"). Chau previously played a Triad boss in the DC Extended Universe film Birds of Prey (2020).
- Robert Lee Leng as Link Tsai: Deputy to "the Dai Lo" of the Gotham Triads and an associate of Oz.
- Marié Botha as Magpie: An Arkham inmate imprisoned for serial theft.
- Jared Abrahamson as Squid: Calvin's cousin and a drug dealer from Crown Point who Victor has known since before the flood.
- Nadine Malouf as Summer Gleeson: A journalist who becomes one of the Hangman's victims.
- Con O'Neill as Mackenzie Bock: The GCPD chief. O'Neill reprises his role from The Batman.
- Rhys Coiro as Sebastian Hady: A corrupt Gotham Councilman with a gambling addiction.
- Jayme Lawson as Bella Reál: The mayor-elect of Gotham. Lawson reprises her role from The Batman.

== Episodes ==
No.	Title	Directed by	Written by	Original release date	U.S. viewers (millions)
1	"After Hours"	Craig Zobel	Lauren LeFranc	September 19, 2024	0.242
In November 2022, one week after the assassination of Carmine Falcone and the destruction of Gotham City's seawall, (Note: As depicted in The Batman (2022)) Oswald "Oz" Cobb is caught by Alberto Falcone, Carmine's son and heir-apparent, as he recovers a stash of Falcone's valuables from the Iceberg Lounge. Alberto reveals plans to revolutionize the Falcone drug operation; after Alberto ridicules Oz's aspirations to be a powerful mobster, Oz impulsively shoots him dead. Oz attempts to dispose of Alberto's body and threatens a group of juvenile delinquents who attempt to steal rims from his car. He spares Victor "Vic" Aguilar after hearing him stutter and recruits him. Oz learns that the Falcones plan to assume control of his drug ring while Alberto's sister, Sofia Falcone, newly released from Arkham Asylum, suspects Oz is responsible for Alberto's disappearance. Oz's plans to skip town are discouraged by his mother, Francis. Oz visits Falcone's rival, Salvatore Maroni, in Blackgate Prison, offering to bring the drug operation back into Maroni's control. Maroni is reluctant, but reconsiders after Oz returns a ring Carmine had taken from Maroni. Sofia later captures and tortures Oz, but is distracted by the sudden recovery of Alberto's body, staged by Vic to implicate Maroni's crew. Oz is released and begins plotting with Vic to take control of the Falcone crime family.
2	"Inside Man"	Craig Zobel	Erika L. Johnson	September 29, 2024	0.299
Though irate that Oz framed him, Maroni continues their partnership by allowing Oz to help with a Falcone drop shipment that is subsequently taken by Maroni's crew. Carmine's brother, Luca, arrives to head the family. Meanwhile, Francis is revealed to be suffering from dementia. Sofia suffers from PTSD from Alberto's death and becomes increasingly unhinged, and is convinced someone in the crew is a mole for Maroni. She bribes retired GCPD detective Marcus Wise, formerly on her father's payroll, to investigate the heist, and the man kidnaps Ervad, one of Maroni's henchmen. Maroni's wife, Nadia, assigns Oz to retrieve Ervad before the Falcones get him to talk. During Alberto's funeral, Oz enlists Vic to plant evidence to frame Falcone's underboss Johnny Viti for Alberto's murder, while he reaches Ervad to have him implicate Viti. However, Vic is caught trying to plant the evidence and barely escapes; Oz murders Ervad with a switchblade and frames Sofia's enforcer Castillo as the mole by planting the weapon on him. Luca executes Castillo, denying Sofia's demand that she do so to avenge Alberto, and orders her out of the family business. Oz makes Vic dig a grave for Ervad and Castillo, threatening to kill him if he fails him again. He then meets with Sofia, who proposes a partnership to wipe out the Falcone family hierarchy so she may take control.
3	"Bliss"	Craig Zobel	Noelle Valdivia	October 6, 2024	0.365
In flashbacks, Vic is orphaned after the seawall explosion drowns his family. In the present, Sofia introduces Oz to a new drug that was used on her and the other inmates at Arkham; Oz names it "Bliss". Together, they pitch to the Triads to help distribute the Bliss, but they refuse to do business with the pair unless they gain the support of Viti. Oz and Sofia blackmail Viti for his support by threatening to expose him having sex with Luca's wife. The Triads then enter into business with Oz and Sofia. Meanwhile, Vic is torn between his desire to leave Gotham with his girlfriend in pursuit of a better life or staying with Oz to become rich and powerful; he also fears that Oz will kill him if he tries to desert. When Oz learns of Vic's intentions, he admits he genuinely respects and allows him to leave. Vic chooses Oz over his girlfriend and returns, only to find Oz and Sofia held by the Maronis, who have realized Oz's duplicity. Before a hitman can execute Oz, Vic crashes Oz's car into the hitman and they escape, leaving Sofia abandoned to her fate with the Maronis.
4	"Cent'Anni"	Helen Shaver	John McCutcheon	October 13, 2024	0.368
In flashbacks, Sofia learns from reporter Summer Gleeson that Carmine is suspected of being "the Hangman", a serial killer who strangles and hangs women; her mother had died under the same circumstances when she was a child. Desperate for answers, Sofia meets with the reporter privately. Oz alerts Carmine, who retaliates by framing Sofia for the murders and having her committed to Arkham Asylum, horrifying Alberto and Oz. Though she is only confined for six months, Carmine extends her stay to over a decade. The inmates constantly mock her, while her doctor, Ventris, subjects her to electroshock therapy. Ventris's associate, Dr. Julian Rush, eventually realizes that Sofia is innocent and quits. The mental and physical strain leads Sofia to a breakdown, and she murders her cell neighbor Magpie. In the present, Sofia is extracted to safety by Rush. Having learned from Nadia that Oz murdered Alberto, Sofia decides she can trust nobody. That night, she kills everyone in the Falcone mansion with carbon monoxide from a generator, including Luca. She spares Gia, her cousin's young daughter, and Viti, whom she holds at gunpoint.
5	"Homecoming"	Helen Shaver	Breannah Gibson & Shaye Ogbonna	October 20, 2024	0.385
Oz and his crew kidnap Maroni's son, Taj, as ransom in exchange for the Bliss shipment stolen by Nadia. At the same time, Oz has Vic look after Francis. During the trade, a guard bribed by Oz tries to assassinate Maroni in Blackgate, while Oz kills Taj and Nadia by setting them both on fire. The fire activates chemical extinguishing sprays and destroys most of the Bliss, while Maroni survives the attempt on his life and escapes prison. Meanwhile, Gia is sent to a children's home, and Sofia tortures Viti until he decides to support her bid to be the family head. Joined by Rush, who has fallen in love with her, Sofia rebrands the family under her mother's name, Gigante, and earns their loyalty by arguing how they were similarly mistreated and neglected under Carmine's rule; when Viti objects to her plans, Sofia executes him. She and a grieving Maroni later ally to kill Oz. Elsewhere, Oz is in a panic upon learning of Maroni's escape, losing the support of his lover, Eve, while his mother berates him for forcing her to hide in a condemned apartment. Oz remembers an abandoned underground railway, shows it to Vic, and declares it their new base of operations to regrow the Bliss.
6	"Gold Summit"	Kevin Bray	Nick Towne	October 27, 2024	0.324
Oz has grown his empire significantly, reproducing and distributing the Bliss in the underground trolley system. Sofia and the Maronis kill several Bliss dealers as a warning, leading Oz to give away Bliss for free to raise demand across all other gang territories. Vic is confronted by Squid, a drug dealer from his neighborhood, who asks Vic to let him join the operation. Vic attempts to pay him off, but when Squid threatens to expose Vic and Oz unless he gets a meeting with Oz, Vic shoots him dead and flees. Francis' condition deteriorates further, and she has Oz promise to kill her if she becomes severely ill. Oz threatens a corrupt council member to restore electricity to Crown Point, and sets a meeting with the heads of the other gangs, whom he convinces to work together against the Gigantes, Maronis, and the upper elite. Sofia and Sal break into Oz's apartment to find leverage against him, and Sofia discovers a photo of Eve. Sofia visits Eve, threatening to kill her to get to Oz, but Eve gives up his location after Sofia reveals Oz was aware of the true identity of the Hangman. Francis and Vic dance to music after power is restored to Crown Point, just as Sofia enters with a crowbar.
7	"Top Hat"	Kevin Bray	Vladimir Cvetko	November 3, 2024	0.384
As a child, Oz is resentful of his mother Francis's attention to his brothers, Jack and Benny. After a game of hide and seek, Oz traps his brothers inside an overflowing sewer tunnel, where they drown. In the present, Oz returns to his apartment and finds an injured Vic, who reveals that Sofia has kidnapped Francis. Vic escapes right before Maroni arrives with his men; Maroni beats Oz and has Oz take him to his underground lair. Oz and his men stage an ambush, and Maroni dies of a heart attack while fighting Oz. Meanwhile, Sofia has Rush interrogate Francis about Oz's weaknesses and visits Gia after learning she intends to cooperate with the police. Disillusioned after seeing the pain she has caused Gia, Sofia considers accepting Oz's ultimatum to trade Francis for his Bliss supply, but Rush convinces her to go through with her desire to see Oz suffer. During the trade, Sofia sends in a bomb that destroys Oz's base and kills his entire crew. Oz survives and resurfaces, only to be knocked out by Detective Marcus Wise.
8	"A Great or Little Thing"	Jennifer Getzinger	Lauren LeFranc	November 10, 2024	0.464
Using EMDR therapy, Rush learns that Francis already knew about Oz drowning his brothers and tried to have him killed, but could not bring herself to do it. Oz is brought to Sofia, who makes Francis confess the truth. Oz refuses to admit his actions even as Rush tortures Francis, causing her to disown him before suffering a stroke. Oz escapes, kills Detective Wise, and brings Francis to the hospital. Meanwhile, the local bosses abandon Oz for Sofia, who puts out a bounty for Oz as she prepares to leave Gotham. Vic arranges for the bosses to be murdered by their deputies, who help Oz abduct Sofia. Instead of killing her, Oz has his police contacts return her to Arkham. Oz and Vic visit Francis to celebrate, only to learn that she entered a vegetative state, causing Oz to break down. Later that night, Vic tells Oz that he views him as family, which Oz reciprocates. Oz then murders Vic, saying that family makes people weak. Meanwhile, Rush, who has returned to Arkham to care for Sofia, hands her a letter from her half-sister, Selina Kyle. Oz takes the vegetative Francis to a new penthouse suite, where he dances with Eve dressed as Francis, as the Bat-Signal shines in the sky.

== Production ==
=== Development ===
By September 2021, HBO Max was developing a spin-off series from the film The Batman (2022), focusing on the character Oz / the Penguin, portrayed in the film by Colin Farrell. The Batman director Matt Reeves suggested to studio executives that a sequel film could explore the Penguin further, but they wanted to use the idea for a spin-off series instead. Lauren LeFranc was hired to write the series, while Reeves and The Batman producer Dylan Clark were set as executive producers through their respective production companies 6th & Idaho and Dylan Clark Productions. They had previously begun development on another spin-off series focused on the Gotham City Police Department (GCPD), but by early March 2022 that series had been put on hold in favor of spin-offs focused on existing comic book characters; of these, the Penguin series was the furthest along in development at that time. The GCPD series was no longer moving forward by July 2024, though some elements were integrated into the Penguin series. Reeves was unsure then whether he would be directing the series, which he said would come before a sequel to The Batman and could tie into that potential second film. Following The Batman's release, the limited series received a straight-to-series order from HBO Max using the working title The Penguin, with LeFranc confirmed to serve as showrunner and executive producer. 6th & Idaho's Daniel Pipski and Adam Kassan were also set as executive producers, along with Rafi Crohn as a co-executive producer. Star Colin Farrell said in July that Reeves would not be directing the series but was providing guidance on the structure of the scripts and was involved in choosing their director. In October, Craig Zobel was hired to direct the first three episodes of the series and to serve as an executive producer.

After James Gunn and Peter Safran became the co-CEOs of DC Studios in November 2022, future projects for Reeves's The Batman shared universe were set to be overseen by that studio. Gunn had contacted Reeves about his projects by then. When announcing the first projects for the new DC franchise, the DC Universe (DCU), in January 2023, Gunn said any project that did not fit into the DCU's shared universe would be labeled as "DC Elseworlds" moving forward. This is the same as how DC Comics uses the Elseworlds imprint to mark comic books that are separate from the main continuity. Reeves' Batman shared universe was set to be a part of this label, including The Penguin. Reeves and Clark refer to their shared universe as the "Batman Epic Crime Saga". Bill Carraro was set as an executive producer by the following month.

The series consists of eight 60-minute-long episodes, totaling approximately six-to-eight hours of content. Farrell felt this length would provide time to explore Oz's origin story and would allow the series to be "endlessly fun", fascinating, and brutal, as it was intended to have a more mature interpretation; the series was ultimately confirmed to receive a TV-MA rating by the TV Parental Guidelines. In April 2023, the series was officially titled The Penguin and announced to be releasing on the streaming service Max, the successor to HBO Max. Helen Shaver was confirmed as a director in December 2023, followed by directors Kevin Bray and Jennifer Getzinger in September 2024.

=== Writing ===
The series begins one week after the events of The Batman, following the flooding of Gotham City as depicted at the end of the film, which Farrell said made for a "very tricky, very dark story". The series occurs shortly before the events of the film's sequel The Batman: Part II (2028), establishing a "little fabric" of plans that would lead into that film. Farrell said the death of crime boss Carmine Falcone in The Batman had left a power vacuum within Gotham's criminal underworld, resulting in many different forces vying for power. He added the series would be "incredibly violent" and that Oz would face "extraordinary obstacles". Clark said it would show Oz's rise to power and compared the series to Scarface (1983). He added that the series was intended to be a standalone story from The Batman, and would enhance the experience of watching the film. Reeves cited The Long Good Friday (1980) as an additional influence, and said the series was about the American Dream, with Oz being "underestimated... nobody thinks he's capable of doing anything [but he] believes in himself with a visceral violence". Sarah Aubrey, the head of originals for HBO Max, said the goal for the series was to explore Oz's life that is rooted in the streets of Gotham and described him as "a hustler and a strategist with his own ambitions".

LeFranc, Erika L. Johnson, Noelle Valdivia, John McCutcheon, Breannah Gibson, Shaye Ogbonna, Nick Towne, and Vladimir Cvetko wrote episodes of the series. LeFranc had written the pilot script by early March 2022. She was then working on the remaining episodes, when the story for the first season had been finished. Farrell read the first episode by mid-October 2022 and called it "tasty and so unusual", and was excited to further explore the "bang up of Oz" that Reeves envisioned for the character. He was set to read the second and third episodes the following week. The scripts were completed by the start of May 2023.

=== Casting ===
By the time development was revealed to be underway on the series in September 2021, Farrell had been approached about reprising his role as the Penguin from The Batman, but was not contractually obligated to reprise the role. By December, Farrell officially signed on to star in the series and serve as an executive producer on it. He described working with LeFranc as a similarly collaborative experience to working with Reeves on The Batman. In March 2022, Reeves said there was potential for other characters from the film to appear in the series. At the end of October, Cristin Milioti was cast as the female lead Sofia Falcone. In February 2023, Rhenzy Feliz was cast as Victor Aguilar, a lead role which was believed to be a young man who befriends Cobb and becomes his protégé. Later that month, Michael Kelly, Shohreh Aghdashloo, and Deirdre O'Connell were respectively cast as Johnny Viti, Nadia Maroni, and Francis Cobb.

In March 2023, several actors were cast in recurring roles: Clancy Brown as Salvatore Maroni, Michael Zegen as Alberto Falcone, James Madio as Milos Grapa, Scott Cohen as Luca Falcone, and Theo Rossi as Dr. Julian Rush. Maroni was portrayed by an uncredited extra in The Batman. Carmen Ejogo, François Chau, and David H. Holmes were cast in recurring roles in April, with Ejogo playing Eve Karlo, while Craig Walker was confirmed to have joined the series by November 2023. In January 2024, Jared Abrahamson was cast in an undisclosed "key" recurring role, and Mark Strong, who portrayed Thaddeus Sivana in the DC Extended Universe (DCEU), was revealed in May to be appearing in the series, portraying a younger Carmine Falcone in flashbacks; Strong replaces John Turturro, who portrayed the character in The Batman. LeFranc said Turturro was unable to reprise his role due to scheduling issues, leading to the role being recast with Strong for the series. Turturro agreed that it was partially due to this, yet stipulated another reason was his distaste in the explicit violence towards women present in the series, preferring when it was off-screen like the violence of his portrayal of Falcone in The Batman.

The character Bruce Wayne / Batman, portrayed by Robert Pattinson in The Batman, does not appear in the series, which LeFranc and Reeves said in August 2024 was because the creative team wanted to explore a different side of Gotham City in the story. Journalist Jeff Sneider had previously reported in February 2023 and June 2024 that Pattinson would appear in at least one episode, while Gunn explained in March 2023 that there were no issues with the Batman television rights precluding the character from appearing in The Penguin.

=== Design ===
Farrell said in February 2022 that Mike Marino, the makeup designer for The Batman, would return for the series, and he felt the makeup was subtly perfected more, allowing for him to freely explore beyond his facial features. Helen Huang served as the costume designer, and Kalina Ivanov served as the production designer. Reeves said Harvey Weinstein was an inspiration for the Penguin's appearance.

=== Filming ===
Principal photography began on March 1, 2023, in New York City, using the working title Boss. Darran Tiernan served as the cinematographer for the three episodes directed by Zobel. Soundstage work occurred at Silvercup Studios North in Queens. Filming was set to take place in Westchester County, New York on May 16 when picketers participating in the 2023 Writers Guild of America strike caused production to shut down for the day. After further picketing the following day at the series' sets at a church in Harlem, Manhattan, and at Silvercup North that once again shut down filming, production was paused through May 18. Filming of smaller scenes took place the day after in Brooklyn. In June, production was suspended until after the strike concluded.

Filming had been expected to occur over five or six months, and Kelly had one day left of filming to complete before filming was shut down. The writers' strike ended in late September 2023, while the concurrent 2023 SAG-AFTRA strike ended on November 9. At that time, filming on the series was set to resume at the end of the month, and it was considered to be a priority for Warner Bros. Filming resumed on November 27, in the Bronx and took place at Whitestone, Queens the following day. Later episodes feature scenes filmed in Yonkers, New York. Kelly had completed filming his scenes by January 2024, and filming wrapped on February 17.

=== Post-production ===
Henk Van Eeghen and Andy Keir are editors on the series.

=== Music ===
Mick Giacchino, the son of The Batman composer Michael Giacchino, composed the score for the series.

== Marketing ==
The first footage from the series' production was released on April 12, 2023, during the Max Day press event. Anthony D'Alessandro of Deadline Hollywood said the footage had "the look of a dark Sopranos, with Farrell playing a full-on crime boss", while Matt Patches at Polygon also highlighted the Sopranos energy and noted it continued to use the "dark, orange-washed aesthetic" from The Batman. Ryan Scott of /Film said the teaser, which combined the series' footage with behind-the-scenes work, was "shockingly put together" given filming had only recently begun then and that it looked like a "very gritty crime drama". He also noted the teaser billed the series as "the next chapter in The Batman saga". Andy Behbakht for Screen Rant said it would be "fascinating to see how" the series was executed with the Penguin being the lead, given there had not been a previous Batman-related series headlined by a particular villain. New footage was included in a teaser for Max's 2024 content line-up in December 2023.

The first trailer was screened on March 21, 2024, for a world premiere at the Series Mania television festival in Lille, France, and it was released online as a teaser trailer the following day. D'Alessandro noted that the Penguin's "philosophical proclamations and tall tales of yore" in the trailer paid homage to Tony Soprano from The Sopranos, while Aaron Couch of The Hollywood Reporter likened the trailer to "DC's answer to The Sopranos". Mark Hughes at Forbes also compared the trailer's vibe to that of The Sopranos and Scarface and noted it maintained the noir aesthetic from The Batman. A second trailer was released on June 20, 2024. James Hibberd at The Hollywood Reporter noted it included scenes that directly picked up after the ending of The Batman and that it provided a "much more expansive look" at the characters and setting. D'Alessandro acknowledged that the trailer explored the aftermath of Batman's actions from The Batman and highlighted Milioti's Sofia Falcone as being "front and center" in the trailer, calling her a femme fatale who was "not entirely evil" and compared her to similar characters in Batman media released since Tim Burton's Batman Returns (1992), which featured Michelle Pfeiffer's Catwoman in that role. Collider's Erick Massoto noted it depicted the Penguin's strategy to become the Gotham crime boss by exploiting the grief of Falcone's family. Meanwhile, Sandy Schaefer of /Film thought Milloti's performance "may just be the show's secret weapon" and agreed it was tonally similar to The Batman. The series was promoted at the Hall H panel during the 2024 San Diego Comic-Con from July 25 to 27. A recreation of the Gotham Ice Truck and Iceberg Lounge were featured, in addition to appearances from the cast and crew alongside the release of the official trailer.

== Release ==
The Penguin premiered in the United States on HBO on September 19, 2024, at 9 p.m. Eastern Time, and would be re-aired multiple times through September 22. The subsequent seven episodes then aired every Sunday night at that time from September 29 until November 10, 2024. After each episode aired, they were made available on the Warner Bros. streaming service Max (also known as HBO Max). The series was initially planned to premiere in the middle of 2024, but this was delayed to the September 2024 premiere due to the 2023 dual Hollywood strikes.

In May 2024, when The Penguin was originally set to be released on Max, Sky Group acquired the broadcast rights to the series in selected European countries where Max did not yet operate. The series began airing day-and-date on Sky Atlantic and Sky's streaming service Now on September 20. In June 2024, after Warner Bros. Discovery (WBD)—the parent company of Warner Bros. and DC—had shifted many of its planned big-budget Max series based on its intellectual properties to instead be HBO originals beginning in 2025, HBO and Max content CEO Casey Bloys said The Penguin was an "obvious fit as an HBO Original" but could not be altered to such because they had already begun the process of licensing it internationally with the Max label. The following month, the series was moved to debut on HBO after the branding was renegotiated.

The Penguin was released on DVD, Blu-ray, and 4K UHD Blu-ray formats on March 18, 2025.

== Reception ==
=== Critical response ===
Professional ratings
Aggregate scores
Source	Rating
Metacritic	72/100
Rotten Tomatoes	95%
Review scores
Source	Rating
The Daily Telegraph	3/5 stars
Empire	4/5 stars
Entertainment Weekly	B
Evening Standard	5/5 stars
Financial Times	3/5 stars
The Independent	3/5 stars
IndieWire	B−
NME	4/5 stars

On the review aggregator website Rotten Tomatoes, 95% of 212 critics' reviews are positive, with an average rating of 8.3/10. The website's consensus reads: "Depicting Gotham through bone-breaking punches rather than popping onomatopoeia, The Penguin is a grounded crime saga given gravitas by Colin Farrell and a scene-stealing Cristin Milioti." Metacritic, which uses a weighted average, assigned a score of 72 out of 100, based on 41 critics, indicating "generally favorable" reviews.

Reviewing the show on Sky Atlantic, The London Standard's Martin Robinson gave the series five stars. He hailed it as a "[rich] character study, driven by a world-beating 'give him the Emmy now' performance by Colin Farrell". He observed its influence from "1930s Warner Brothers gangster films". Robinson concluded it was "very much an Italian-American gangster Penguin", and compared the title character to Tony Soprano and Vito Corleone. Empire's Amon Warmann gave it four stars, writing that its expansion of Reeves's film was "satisfying proof that this more grounded take on the character warranted a full series". He wrote of its foremost purpose as a character study into Oswald, and praised the episode with the character's mother as "the series' most unique, intriguing dynamic". Warmann concluded that it was the "empathy" for the characters, particularly Rhenzy Feliz's Victor, which made the series riveting.

In a four-star review, NME's Jordan Bassett said that Cristin Milioti's character was "quietly menacing", and that LeFranc succeeded in creating a Gotham distinct from Reeves's, one "slightly less rainy and ... better lit", yet one that retains "the cynicism boiled into the corruption-infested city." Bassett felt disappointed in the show's decreased budget, observing that it hurt the series's set design, and criticized the first episode's "sluggish" pacing. He wrote that the show sees that "the roots of [Oz's] ambition and seething resentment at the world" forge a "compulsive" narrative. Bassett concluded that the show ended up being "more compelling than it perhaps should be", and that "Farrell is as astonishing as ever".

Slate's Isaac Butler praised Farrell's acting and his "unexpected grace notes" of humor expressed in the role. MovieWeb's Julian Roman declared that "Colin Farrell needs to clear space on the shelf for an Emmy", and hailed his performance as "nothing short of extraordinary." He called the series a "psychologically disturbing gangster epic", and compared it to Scarface (1932) and King of New York (1990). He praised its "blockbuster" production values, writing that they are "integral to its harsh realism", citing Kalina Ivanov's work in particular. Reiterating on Farrell's performance, he observed that the actor "convincingly portrays a man living with a significant disability, but he's also strong and utterly merciless when needed." Roman assigned the series a 4/5.

In a less-positive review, IGN's Erik Adams complained that "Lauren LeFranc and team have taken on more than they can handle", and that its aspects of gnarliness and blood lust are "never as sensational as the big budget and prestige-TV trappings make them out to be." He praised Farrell's "gift of gab and a wounded soulfulness". The Daily Telegraph gave it three out of five stars. Ed Power wrote highly of Farrell's reinvention of the Penguin as "a charismatic mobster straight from a Scorsese movie", and felt his return was impressive. He assessed that the creators have created a "grim psychodrama centered on Cobb's troubled relationship with his mentally ill mother", and said that "the only superpower on display is the producers's [sic] ability to take a straightforward story about how Cobb's friendship with Sofia has soured into a deadly rivalry and stretch it into eight hours of often tedious TV." Variety's Aramide Tinubu said that the robust narrative makes it a "masterful examination of criminality", and hailed it as "twisted, disturbing and deeply enthralling." She praised Deirdre O'Connell's performance, and wrote that "the juxtaposition of the [Oz and Sofia] across the show — including flashbacks from their contrasting childhoods and their reactions to losing or gaining dominance — is among the most compelling aspects of [the series]".

=== Accolades ===
Accolades received by The Penguin
Award	Date of ceremony	Category	Recipient	Result	Ref.
American Cinema Editors Eddie Awards	March 14, 2025	Best Edited Limited Series	Henk van Eeghen (for "After Hours")	Nominated	
American Cinema Editors Eddie Awards	February 27, 2026	Best Edited Limited Series	Henk van Eeghen (for "A Great or Little Thing")	Won	
American Film Institute Awards	December 5, 2024	Top 10 TV Programs of the Year	The Penguin	Won	
American Society of Cinematographers Awards	February 23, 2025	Outstanding Achievement in Cinematography in Motion Picture, Limited Series, or Pilot Made for Television	Jonathan Freeman (for "Homecoming")	Nominated	
Art Directors Guild Awards	February 15, 2025	Excellence in Production Design for a Television Movie or Limited Series	Kalina Ivanov	Won	
Astra TV Awards	June 10, 2025	Best Limited Series	The Penguin	Nominated	
Astra TV Awards	June 10, 2025	Best Actor in a Limited Series or TV Movie	Colin Farrell	Won	
Astra TV Awards	June 10, 2025	Best Actress in a Limited Series or TV Movie	Cristin Milioti	Won	
Astra TV Awards	June 10, 2025	Best Supporting Actor in a Limited Series or TV Movie	Clancy Brown	Nominated	
Astra TV Awards	June 10, 2025	Best Supporting Actress in a Limited Series or TV Movie	Deirdre O'Connell	Nominated	
Astra TV Awards	June 10, 2025	Best Cast Ensemble in a Limited Series or TV Movie	The Penguin	Won	
Astra TV Awards	June 10, 2025	Best Directing in a Limited Series or TV Movie	Helen Shaver (for "Cent'Anni")	Nominated	
Astra TV Awards	June 10, 2025	Best Writing in a Limited Series or TV Movie	Lauren LeFranc (for "A Great or Little Thing")	Nominated	
Cinema Audio Society Awards	February 22, 2025	Outstanding Achievement in Sound Mixing for Non-Theatrical Motion Pictures or Limited Series	Christof Gebert, Andy Kris, Rich Bologna, and Mark DeSimone (for "After Hours")	Nominated	
Critics' Choice Super Awards	August 7, 2025	Best Superhero Series, Limited Series or Made-for-TV Movie	The Penguin	Won	
Critics' Choice Super Awards	August 7, 2025	Best Actress in a Superhero Series, Limited Series or Made-for-TV Movie	Cristin Milioti	Won	
Critics' Choice Super Awards	August 7, 2025	Best Actor in a Superhero Series, Limited Series or Made-for-TV Movie	Colin Farrell	Won	
Critics' Choice Super Awards	August 7, 2025	Best Villain in a Series, Limited Series or Made-for-TV Movie	Colin Farrell	Won	
Critics' Choice Television Awards	February 7, 2025	Best Limited Series	The Penguin	Nominated	
Critics' Choice Television Awards	February 7, 2025	Best Actor in a Limited Series or Movie Made for Television	Colin Farrell	Won	
Critics' Choice Television Awards	February 7, 2025	Best Actress in a Limited Series or Movie Made for Television	Cristin Milioti	Won	
Critics' Choice Television Awards	February 7, 2025	Best Supporting Actress in a Limited Series or Movie Made for Television	Deirdre O'Connell	Nominated	
Directors Guild of America Awards	February 8, 2025	Outstanding Directing – Miniseries or TV Film	Kevin Bray (for "Top Hat")	Nominated	
Directors Guild of America Awards	February 8, 2025	Outstanding Directing – Miniseries or TV Film	Helen Shaver (for "Cent'Anni")	Nominated	
Directors Guild of America Awards	February 8, 2025	Outstanding Directing – Miniseries or TV Film	Jennifer Getzinger (for "A Great or Little Thing")	Nominated	
Golden Globe Awards	January 5, 2025	Best Television Limited Series, Anthology Series, or Motion Picture Made for Television	The Penguin	Nominated	
Golden Globe Awards	January 5, 2025	Best Actor in a Limited Series, Anthology Series, or a Motion Picture Made for Television	Colin Farrell	Won	
Golden Globe Awards	January 5, 2025	Best Actress in a Limited Series, Anthology Series, or a Motion Picture Made for Television	Cristin Milioti	Nominated	
Golden Reel Awards	February 23, 2025	Outstanding Achievement in Sound Editing – Broadcast Long Form Dialogue and ADR	Rich Bologna, Lawrence Zipf, Angela Organ, Tony Martinez, and Michael McMenomy (for "Cent'Anni")	Nominated	
Golden Reel Awards	February 23, 2025	Outstanding Achievement in Sound Editing – Broadcast Long Form Effects and Foley	Rich Bologna, Lawrence Zipf, Diego Perez, Wyatt Sprague, Matt Haasch, and Gareth Rhys Jones (for "After Hours")	Nominated	
Golden Reel Awards	February 23, 2025	Outstanding Achievement in Music Editing – Broadcast Long Form	Ben Holiday, Chad Birmingham, and Luke Dennis (for "Cent'Anni")	Won	
Golden Trailer Awards	May 29, 2025	Best Drama (Trailer/Teaser) for a TV/Streaming Series	HBO / Mocean (for "Untouchable")	Nominated	
Golden Trailer Awards	May 29, 2025	Best Drama (TV Spot) for a TV/Streaming Series	HBO / Bond (for "Hype")	Nominated	
Golden Trailer Awards	May 29, 2025	Best BTS/EPK for a TV/Streaming Series (Over 2 minutes)	HBO / Marketing AV (for "Becoming The Penguin")	Won	
Gotham TV Awards	June 2, 2025	Outstanding Lead Performance in a Limited Series	Cristin Milioti	Nominated	
Independent Spirit Awards	February 22, 2025	Best Lead Performance in a New Scripted Series	Cristin Milioti	Nominated	
Irish Film & Television Awards	February 14, 2025	Best Lead Actor (Television)	Colin Farrell	Won	
Irish Film & Television Awards	February 14, 2025	Best Cinematography	Darran Tiernan	Nominated	
Make-Up Artists and Hair Stylists Guild Awards	February 15, 2025	Best Contemporary Make-Up in a Television Series, Television Limited or Miniseries or Television New Media Series	Martha Melendez, Kim Collea, Maria Maio, and Mia Bauman	Nominated	
Make-Up Artists and Hair Stylists Guild Awards	February 15, 2025	Best Contemporary Hair Styling in a Television Series, Television Limited or Miniseries or Television New Media Series	Brian Badie, Jenn Vasilopoulos, Mariko Miyagi, and Bobby Diehl	Nominated	
Make-Up Artists and Hair Stylists Guild Awards	February 15, 2025	Best Special Make-Up Effects in a Television Series, Television Limited or Miniseries or Television New Media Series	Mike Marino, Michael Fontaine, Crystal Jurado, Diana Y. Choi, and Claire Flewin	Won	
NAACP Image Awards	February 22, 2025	Outstanding Hairstyling	Brian Badie	Nominated	
Primetime Emmy Awards	September 14, 2025	Outstanding Limited or Anthology Series	Lauren LeFranc, Matt Reeves, Dylan Clark, Craig Zobel, Colin Farrell, Bill Carraro, Daniel Pipski, Vladimir Cvetko, Erika L. Johnson, Noelle Valdivia, John McCutcheon, Nick Towne, Corina Maritescu, Claudine Farrell, and Dana Robin	Nominated	
Primetime Emmy Awards	September 14, 2025	Outstanding Lead Actor in a Limited or Anthology Series or Movie	Colin Farrell	Nominated	
Primetime Emmy Awards	September 14, 2025	Outstanding Lead Actress in a Limited or Anthology Series or Movie	Cristin Milioti	Won	
Primetime Emmy Awards	September 14, 2025	Outstanding Supporting Actress in a Limited or Anthology Series or Movie	Deirdre O'Connell	Nominated	
Primetime Emmy Awards	September 14, 2025	Outstanding Directing for a Limited or Anthology Series or Movie	Jennifer Getzinger (for "A Great or Little Thing")	Nominated	
Primetime Emmy Awards	September 14, 2025	Outstanding Directing for a Limited or Anthology Series or Movie	Helen Shaver (for "Cent'Anni")	Nominated	
Primetime Emmy Awards	September 14, 2025	Outstanding Writing for a Limited or Anthology Series or Movie	Lauren LeFranc (for "A Great or Little Thing")	Nominated	
Primetime Creative Arts Emmy Awards	September 6, 2025	Outstanding Casting for a Limited or Anthology Series or Movie	Cindy Tolan and Suzanne Ryan	Nominated	
Primetime Creative Arts Emmy Awards	September 6, 2025	Outstanding Cinematography for a Limited or Anthology Series or Movie	David Franco (for "Top Hat")	Nominated	
Primetime Creative Arts Emmy Awards	September 6, 2025	Outstanding Contemporary Costumes for a Limited or Anthology Series or Movie	Helen Huang, Kate Smith, Austin Wittick, Becca Freund, and Esther J. Han (for "A Great or Little Thing")	Won	
Primetime Creative Arts Emmy Awards	September 6, 2025	Outstanding Contemporary Hairstyling	Brian Badie, Jenn Vasilopoulos, and Mariko Miyagi (for "Cent'Anni")	Won	
Primetime Creative Arts Emmy Awards	September 6, 2025	Outstanding Contemporary Makeup (Non-Prosthetic)	Martha Melendez, Kim Collea, and Maria Maio (for "Cent'Anni")	Won	
Primetime Creative Arts Emmy Awards	September 6, 2025	Outstanding Prosthetic Makeup	Mike Marino, Michael Fontaine, Crystal Jurado, Diana Choi, Claire Flewin, Jerry Constantine, Yoichi Art Sakamoto, and Bobby Diehl (for "After Hours")	Won	
Primetime Creative Arts Emmy Awards	September 6, 2025	Outstanding Title Design	Aaron Becker, Joseph Ahn, Michael Lo, James Robertson, Hsien Lun Su, Alasdair Willson, and Ben Hurand	Nominated	
Primetime Creative Arts Emmy Awards	September 6, 2025	Outstanding Music Composition for a Limited or Anthology Series, Movie or Special (Original Dramatic Score)	Mick Giacchino (for "After Hours")	Won	
Primetime Creative Arts Emmy Awards	September 6, 2025	Outstanding Picture Editing for a Limited or Anthology Series or Movie	Andy Keir (for "Bliss")	Nominated	
Primetime Creative Arts Emmy Awards	September 6, 2025	Outstanding Picture Editing for a Limited or Anthology Series or Movie	Meg Reticker (for "Cent'Anni")	Nominated	
Primetime Creative Arts Emmy Awards	September 6, 2025	Outstanding Picture Editing for a Limited or Anthology Series or Movie	Henk Van Eeghen (for "A Great or Little Thing")	Nominated	
Primetime Creative Arts Emmy Awards	September 6, 2025	Outstanding Production Design for a Narrative Contemporary Program (One Hour or More)	Kalina Ivanov, Deborah Wheatley, Rich Murray, Richard Devine (for "Homecoming")	Nominated	
Primetime Creative Arts Emmy Awards	September 6, 2025	Outstanding Sound Editing for a Limited or Anthology Series, Movie or Special	Rich Bologna, Larry Zipf, Michael McMenomy, Angela Organ, Tony Martinez, Wyatt Sprague, Diego Perez, Matt Haasch, Ben Holiday, Luke Dennis, and Gareth Rhys Jones (for "After Hours")	Won	
Primetime Creative Arts Emmy Awards	September 6, 2025	Outstanding Sound Mixing for a Limited or Anthology Series or Movie	Rich Bologna, Andy Kris, Chris Gebert, and Julien Pirrie (for "After Hours")	Won	
Primetime Creative Arts Emmy Awards	September 6, 2025	Outstanding Special Visual Effects in a Single Episode	Johnny Han, Michelle Rose, Alexandre Prod'homme, Erin Sullivan, Goran Pavles, Emanuel Fuchs, Ed Bruce, Nathaniel Larouche, and Adrien Saint Girons (for "Bliss")	Won	
Primetime Creative Arts Emmy Awards	September 6, 2025	Outstanding Stunt Coordination for Drama Programming	Stephen Pope	Nominated	
Primetime Creative Arts Emmy Awards	September 6, 2025	Outstanding Stunt Performance	Corey Pierno and Chris Gombos (for "Top Hat")	Nominated	
Producers Guild of America Awards	February 8, 2025	David L. Wolper Award for Outstanding Producer of Limited or Anthology Series Television	Lauren LeFranc, Matt Reeves, Dylan Clark, Craig Zobel, Colin Farrell, Bill Carraro, Daniel Pipski, Vladimir Cvetko, Erika L. Johnson, Noelle Valdivia, John McCutcheon, Dana Robin, Nick Towne, Corina Maritescu, and Claudine Farrell	Nominated	
Saturn Awards	February 2, 2025	Best Superhero Television Series	The Penguin	Nominated	
Saturn Awards	February 2, 2025	Best Actor in a Television Series	Colin Farrell	Won	
Saturn Awards	February 2, 2025	Best Supporting Actress in a Television Series	Cristin Milioti	Won	
Saturn Awards	February 2, 2025	Best Performance by a Younger Actor in a Television Series	Rhenzy Feliz	Nominated	
Saturn Awards	March 8, 2026	Best Television Home Media Release	The Penguin Season 1	Nominated	
Satellite Awards	January 26, 2025	Best Miniseries & Limited Series or Motion Picture Made for Television	The Penguin	Nominated	
Satellite Awards	January 26, 2025	Best Actor in a Miniseries, Limited Series, or Motion Picture Made for Television	Colin Farrell	Won	
Satellite Awards	January 26, 2025	Best Supporting Actress on Television	Cristin Milioti	Nominated	
Screen Actors Guild Awards	February 23, 2025	Outstanding Performance by a Male Actor in a Television Movie or Limited Series	Colin Farrell	Won	
Screen Actors Guild Awards	February 23, 2025	Outstanding Performance by a Female Actor in a Television Movie or Limited Series	Cristin Milioti	Nominated	
Screen Actors Guild Awards	February 23, 2025	Outstanding Action Performance by a Stunt Ensemble in a Television Series	The Penguin	Nominated	
Television Critics Association Awards	August 20, 2025	Outstanding Achievement in Movies, Miniseries or Specials	The Penguin	Nominated	
Visual Effects Society Awards	February 11, 2025	Outstanding Special (Practical) Effects in a Photoreal or Animated Project	Devin Maggio, Johnny Han, Cory Candrilli, and Alexandre Prod'homme (for "Safe Guns")	Won	
Visual Effects Society Awards	February 11, 2025	Emerging Technology Award	Johnny Han, Jefferson Han, Joseph Menafra, and Michael Pynn (for "Phase Synced Flash-Gun System")	Nominated	
Visual Effects Society Awards	February 11, 2025	Outstanding Supporting Visual Effects in a Photoreal Episode	Johnny Han, Michelle Rose, Goran Pavles, Ed Bruce, and Devin Maggio (for "Bliss")	Won	
Visual Effects Society Awards	February 11, 2025	Outstanding Compositing and Lighting in an Episode	Jonas Stuckenbrock, Karen Chang, Eugene Bondar, and Miky Girón (for "After Hours")	Won	
Writers Guild of America Awards	February 15, 2025	Limited Series	Vladimir Cvetko, Breannah Gibson, Erika L. Johnson, Lauren LeFranc, Corina Maritescu, Megan Martin, John McCutcheon, Shaye Ogbonna, Nick Towne, Noelle Valdivia, and Kira Snyder	Won	

== Future ==
Reeves confirmed in July 2024 that Farrell would reprise his role as the Penguin in The Batman: Part II (2028). Farrell said that for a while he did not know if he would appear in the sequel and had yet to see a script, stating, "I was told I have five or six scenes." He also stated that he had signed on for three The Batman films. After the season finale, Farrell said he would be open to starring in a second season of The Penguin after previously stating, "I never want to put on that fucking suit and fucking head again". A method actor, he has gone on record that he was in a mentally dark place during the production due to the dark story. Reeves has also stated that a second season is possible. He had begun discussing ideas for a second season with LeFranc by December 2024. In October 2025, Farrell stated he would bet against the release of season two, noting that it would depend on the storyline.
