= Bliss (The Penguin) =

- The Penguin episode
- Episode no.: Episode 3
- Directed by: Craig Zobel
- Written by: Noelle Valdivia
- Cinematography by: Darran Tiernan
- Editing by: Andy Keir
- Original air date: October 6, 2024
- Running time: 60 minutes

Guest appearances
- Aria Shahghasemi as Taj Maroni; François Chau as Feng Zhao

Episode chronology
← Previous "Inside Man"	Next → "Cent'Anni"

"Bliss" is the third episode of the American crime drama television miniseries The Penguin, a spin-off from the film The Batman. The episode was written by co-executive producer Noelle Valdivia, and directed by executive producer Craig Zobel. It was first broadcast on HBO in the United States on October 6, 2024, and also was available on Max on the same date.

Set shortly after the events of the film, the series explores the rise to power of Oswald "Oz" Cobb / Penguin (portrayed by Colin Farrell) in Gotham City's criminal underworld. Oz finds himself allied with a young man named Victor (Rhenzy Feliz), while also having to deal with the presence of Sofia Falcone (Cristin Milioti), who wants answers regarding her brother's disappearance. In the episode, Victor's past is explored, while Oz and Sofia seek a new partner in their new organization.

According to Nielsen Media Research, the episode was seen by an estimated 0.365 million household viewers and gained a 0.07 ratings share among adults aged 18–49. The episode received highly positive reviews from critics, who praised the flashbacks sequences, Victor's character development, performances and ending.

== Plot ==
In a flashback, Victor drops off tools at his family's apartment, before leaving to meet up with friends, despite his father's disapproval for one of Victor's friend's cousin being a known drug dealer. While hanging out with his girlfriend Graciela on a rooftop, Victor witnesses multiple explosions across Gotham City, destroying the seawall. (Note: As depicted in The Batman.) In the distance, Victor sees the flood hitting his house, killing his family.

In present day, Sofia introduces Oz to her drug operation, a new product that was used on her and the other inmates at Arkham Asylum, with Oz naming it "Bliss." To build a new operation base, Oz gets them to meet with Link Tsai, a Triad member. Meanwhile, Victor is visited by Graciela and learns she's leaving for California to start over. Victor reveals he is working for Oz and Graciela urges him to leave with her. Tempted, he gives her a share of his $1000 stipend and tells her to buy bus tickets for the both of them.

Meanwhile, in the Chinatown district, Link begrudges Oz over an unpaid debt, and will only accept to arrange a meeting with Triad's leader Feng Zhao if they get Johnny Viti's support. As he awaits for Oz and Sofia outside, Victor is approached by a police officer, but he swiftly smooths things over by letting the officer "confiscate" the remaining money that Oz gave him, something Oz congratulates him over later.

While dining with Oz, Victor opens up about his family, particularly his father having settled as a mechanic over becoming a chef, and how he never asked better of life; while Oz gives a toast in his honor, he advises Victor to strive for better as the world is unfair for honest people. Later, he and Sofia catch Johnny Viti in a hotel room having sex with Luca Falcone's wife, forcing him to support their plan and call Feng Zhao as a sign of trust. They meet at a nightclub and, while Zhao is intrigued, he believes the risk outweights the benefits, citing Sofia's stay at Arkham as a liability. Sofia convinces him to give it a chance, pointing out that the citizens of Gotham will rush to use the drug as an escape after what the Riddler did to the city but, upset, she leaves the meeting and has Oz secure the Triad's partnership. While Victor tries to dance with a girl in the nightclub, the lights trigger his memories of the night of the seawall's explosion, causing him to have a panic attack.

Oz is delighted with the new partnership, but becomes upset when he finds that Victor wants to leave to flee with Graciela. He feels insulted that Victor thought he was forced to work for him and, dejected, he lets him go. Victor steals Oz's car and drives to the bus station to reunite with Graciela, but ends up not going with her. Back at the nightclub, Oz and Sofia argue over who is actually in control of the operation, Sofia citing her mistrust of Oz over her internment at Arkham, leaving it uncertain that she really is "the Hangman" or not. Oz attempts to mend their relationship, pledging his loyalty to her, when they are suddenly ambushed by Nadia Maroni and her men, who prepare to execute Oz after discovering his duplicity. Victor returns just in time and kills one of Maroni's henchmen by ramming into him with the car. Oz gets in the car and they drive off, as he orders Victor to leave Sofia behind.

== Production ==
=== Development ===
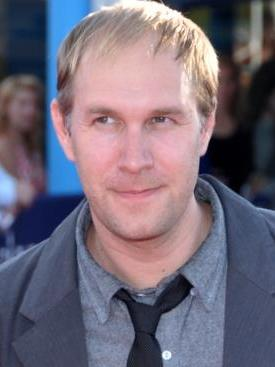
Executive producer Craig Zobel directed the episode.

The episode was written by co-executive producer Noelle Valdivia, and directed by executive producer Craig Zobel. It marked Valdivia's first writing credit, and Zobel's third directing credit. Zobel's involvement was reported in October 2022, when he was confirmed to direct the first episode.

=== Writing ===
On the opening scene, Rhenzy Feliz said, "I think it's massive that the audience gets to see a little bit of [Victor's life] before that existed, before that was what was being asked of him. These things are so difficult for him because Oswald "Oz" Cobb / Penguin seemingly does it on command and [Sofia] is a little bit off the wall as well. Victor's in this space where he's a good kid and he's brought into a world that he's never encountered before".

Feliz said that by having Victor lose his family, he lost "his purpose", which explains why he stuck with Oz at the end of the episode, "in Oz, he finds a bit of purpose. There's this grand thing that they're trying to accomplish, and he can be a part of something bigger than just himself". He considered the final scene to be a turning point for Victor, "Oz says it at the end of the episode, ‘We're really in it now, kid.’” You can see it on his face, it's, ‘Oh my god, what have I done? Did I make the right decision?’ I think ultimately he decides he did. This is the right thing to do and I see that now". He also said that whatever happens next, "it's not looking very, very bright. I don't know whether I'm ever going to make out of my life, but if I stay here with this guy who seems to have a plan, who seems to be figuring it out, my life could change".

=== Filming ===
The episode's flashbacks depict the seawall's explosion seen in The Batman (2022). Director Craig Zobel was delighted in showing "a scene [that] I feel like you don't get to see in a superhero story very often". For the scene, the crew studied floods during Hurricane Katrina, as well as other floods in Germany. Zobel said this was "to just see what happened, physically, and how devastating they can be".

== Reception ==
=== Viewers ===
In its original American broadcast, "Bliss" was seen by an estimated 0.365 million household viewers with a 0.07 in the 18–49 demographics. This means that 0.07 percent of all households with televisions watched the episode. This was a 22% increase in viewership from the previous episode, which was seen by an estimated 0.299 million household viewers with a 0.04 in the 18–49 demographics.

=== Critical reviews ===
"Bliss" received highly positive reviews from critics. The review aggregator website Rotten Tomatoes reported a 100% approval rating for the episode, with an average rating of 8.7/10 and based on 9 critic's reviews.

Tyler Robertson of IGN gave the episode a "great" 8 out of 10 and wrote in his verdict, "Laser-focussed on digging into the minds of Victor, Sofia, and Oz, “Bliss” saves the excitement for next time, and is better for it. A well-scripted and well-paced episode, it delivers a long-awaited backstory for Vic that was always going to be devastating, but uses the details to hit even harder. That, alongside the disappointing-yet-inevitable decision he makes towards the end, makes this a great origin story for the show's most interesting character."

William Hughes of The A.V. Club gave the episode a "B+" grade and wrote, "There are individual moments that work here, most especially his final confrontation with Oz in the bathroom of the Chinese club, Feliz letting out some of the rage and fear kicking around in the character's head to shout his boss/captor down. But his trauma is also treated with a pretty heavy hand, as his mid-club panic attack takes the form of blipping images and racing sounds in a way that feels just a little too boilerplate. At the same time, it feels like Victor's motivations never come fully into focus: In the end, it feels less like he rejects Graciela’s offer of escape for organic reasons than because he's the third-billed cast member of this TV show — and it still has five more episodes to go."

Andy Andersen of Vulture gave the episode a 4 star rating out of 5 and wrote, "In the final moments of its third episode, The Penguin finds its signature rhythms and makes a clearer invitation to join its wavelength — sufficiently meeting the awkward demand of an “IP-based HBO crime show” while telling its own type of broad, exaggerated but meaningful American criminal origin story. Gotham is America, America is the world, and if Oz is to be believed, the world could be yours."

Joe George of Den of Geek gave the episode a 2 star rating out of 5 and wrote, "Maybe, now The Penguin has finished trying to build pathos by pretending to be something other than it is. Maybe, the show is ready to accept that it's a Batman spinoff about supervillains in Gotham City. Maybe it's ready to be in it now." Nate Richard of Collider gave the episode an 8 out of 10 rating and wrote, "The first two episodes of The Penguin allowed us to dive deep into the psyche of Oz, but this week shifts the focus toward Victor, fleshing out the character even more and allowing the audience to have a deeper understanding of him."

Lisa Babick of TV Fanatic gave the episode a 4.8 star rating out of 5 rating and wrote, "Honestly, “Bliss” had so many twists and turns that it could’ve easily been a blockbuster movie. I would've loved to have seen it on the big screen." Chris Gallardo of Telltale TV gave the episode a 4.5 star rating out of 5 rating and wrote, "What could happen in the next episode remains shrouded in mystery. Nonetheless, “Bliss” successfully shapes Victor into a complex character while increasing the tensions between all three leads."

=== Accolades ===
TVLine named Rhenzy Feliz as an honorable mention as the "Performer of the Week" for the week of October 12, 2024, for his performance in the episode. The site wrote, "Though the combustible dynamic between Oz Cobb and Sofia Falcone provides an exciting throughline to The Penguin, it's Rhenzy Feliz as Vic Aguilar who has proven to be the emotional heart of the series. Vic took center stage in the third episode, “Bliss,” as flashbacks showed the night the Riddler set off those explosions in The Batman, flooding Gotham City. Feliz's empathetic performance let us see the innocent kid Vic was and how he was forever traumatized by the events that took his family from him. In the show's present day, Feliz showed just how torn Vic was between leaving town with his girlfriend and staying in Gotham — first, because he was fearful of Oz's retribution and then thanks to Oz displaying warmth, yet also angrily telling him he could have a bigger and better life. Feliz invested us in Vic's decision and why he'd latch onto a parental figure (albeit a decidedly criminal one) that he desperately misses."
