= Top Hat (The Penguin) =

- The Penguin episode
- Episode no.: Episode 7
- Directed by: Kevin Bray
- Written by: Vladimir Cvetko
- Cinematography by: David Franco
- Editing by: Meg Reticker
- Original air date: November 3, 2024
- Running time: 47 minutes

Guest appearance
- Emily Meade as Young Francis Cobb

Episode chronology
← Previous "Gold Summit"	Next → "A Great or Little Thing"

"Top Hat" is the seventh episode of the American crime drama television miniseries The Penguin, a spin-off from the film The Batman. The episode was written by co-executive producer Vladimir Cvetko, and directed by Kevin Bray. It was first broadcast on HBO in the United States on November 3, 2024, and also was available on Max on the same date.

Set shortly after the events of the film, the series explores the rise to power of Oswald "Oz" Cobb / Penguin (portrayed by Colin Farrell) in Gotham City's criminal underworld. Oz finds himself allied with a young man named Victor (Rhenzy Feliz), while also having to deal with the presence of Sofia Falcone (Cristin Milioti), who wants answers regarding her brother's disappearance. In the episode, Maroni forces Oz to take him to his base of operations, while Sofia kidnaps Francis. Flashbacks depict Oz's childhood, delving into his relationship with his mother.

According to Nielsen Media Research, the episode was seen by an estimated 0.384 million household viewers and gained a 0.07 rating share among adults aged 18–49. The episode received positive reviews from critics, who praised the performances, character development, and closure to Maroni's story arc.

== Plot ==
In a flashback to 1988, a young Oz lives with his mother Francis and his brothers Jack and Benny, and resents the affection his siblings receive from Francis. While walking in the streets, the three brothers run into notorious criminal Rex Calabrese, who gives Jack 50 dollars. Jack leads his siblings to an abandoned underground railway, where they play a game of hide and seek. Jack and Benny hide in an overflow tunnel, which they entered via a ladder that is difficult for the disabled Oz to access. An angry Oz locks Jack and Benny in the overflow tunnel before leaving for his house. While he and Francis watch Top Hat, Jack and Benny scream for help to no avail as they drown in the tunnel during a rainstorm.

In present day, Oz arrives at Crown Point, discovering Victor unconscious and Francis gone. Upon awakening, Victor informs Oz that Sofia took Francis. When Sal arrives with his henchmen, Oz forces Victor to flee. Sal brutally assaults Oz, but takes him alive so he can face Sofia as well. Sofia has taken Francis to her mansion, but Francis is not frightened of her, telling her that Oz will kill her, before suffering another dementia episode. Rush informs Sofia that the police are looking to question Gia at her orphanage, as she is the only witness in the Falcones' death.

Sal forces Oz to take him to his base of operations, declaring that the Bliss business now belongs to him. Oz provokes Sal towards violence, seizing the opportunity for his men to turn off the lights and commence a shootout. Oz gains the upper hand during a brawl with Sal, but Sal suddenly dies of a heart attack. Oz is disappointed at not being able to personally kill his rival. Sofia visits Gia at the orphanage, where Gia reveals she found a gas mask in her purse, wondering if she killed her family. Sofia claims her innocence, only to discover that Gia has been harming herself during her stay. Sofia tells Gia that her family were bad people who deserved to die, and that she deserves better than the Falcones as family. Oz calls Sofia to inform her of Sal's death, and offers her the Maroni's criminal empire as well as his Bliss operation in exchange for Francis' safe return.

Sofia returns to the mansion and admits to Rush that she has become disillusioned about her position after seeing the pain she has caused Gia, so she has accepted Oz's deal. However, Rush convinces her to follow through on her desire to see Oz suffer. Sofia sends a van inside Oz's base of operations, calling him from another part of the city to tell him she has sent him a gift. Oz, thinking Francis' body is in the car, instead discovers explosives, and hides in the tunnel while the bombs detonate, destroying the base and killing his entire crew. In another flashback, a young Oz and Francis go to a jazz club, where Francis asks Oz to become successful enough to finally provide her a happy life, which Oz promises. Back in present day, Oz recovers from the explosion and resurfaces, only to be knocked out by detective Marcus Wise.

== Production ==
=== Development ===
The episode was written by co-executive producer Vladimir Cvetko and directed by Kevin Bray. It marked Cvetko's first writing credit, and Bray's second directing credit.

=== Writing ===
On Maroni's death, Clancy Brown said, "Sal has an expression of fear that he knows he's having a heart attack and dying. He was going to kill him. He was ready to do it. He was doing it actively when it happened. Then it becomes about Oz's frustration because he's an animal too and he wants to win, he wants to kill. He wants to be a predator". According to Brown, the scene was originally supposed to feature Maroni pouring gasoline over Oz. The idea was scrapped, as the crew feared that the gasoline would ruin Farrell's make-up, "You can really ruin it by even pouring water on it, because it would absorb all the water and eventually get water logged and be even more miserable for Colin to wear".

Cristin Milioti complimented the scene where Sofia visits Gia at the orphanage, "I remember reading that scene and being like, ‘holy moly,’ it's such a brutal scene. But I was so excited about it and so moved by it; it's so complicated. But of course, this is what this person would do. What's beautiful about that scene, too, is she's quite literally trying to burn her father's legacy to the ground and saying, ‘I'm nothing like him, he's a monster,’ and she does the exact same thing to this little girl. She sentences her to the exact same life, in a way, but she truly is believing that she's doing that child a service. In her mind, she's doing the right thing — ‘I'm saving you from something you don't know about’ — while ruining this child's life". She added, "The horror of that moment for her is realizing that she has become the person she rails against the most. The fact that it all happens in that one sequence is so beautiful".

== Reception ==
=== Viewers ===
In its original American broadcast, "Top Hat" was seen by an estimated 0.384 million household viewers with a 0.07 in the 18–49 demographics. This means that 0.07 percent of all households with televisions watched the episode. This was a 18% increase in viewership from the previous episode, which was seen by an estimated 0.324 million household viewers with a 0.08 in the 18–49 demographics.

=== Critical reviews ===
"Top Hat" received positive reviews from critics. The review aggregator website Rotten Tomatoes reported a 100% approval rating for the episode, with an average rating of 8.2/10 and based on 10 critic's reviews.

Tyler Robertson of IGN gave the episode an "okay" 6 out of 10 and wrote in his verdict, "The Penguin's penultimate episode continues a trend of late-in-the-game pacing issues, as things end up relatively in the same place they were at the beginning of 'Top Hat.' There are moments near the end that feel like they're driving towards an exciting finale, but the attempt to deepen Oz's relationship with his mother through a flashback to the day Jack and Benny died is superficial. It's another episode that feels full of necessary but less than satisfying details."

William Hughes of The A.V. Club gave the episode a "B+" grade and wrote, "Excepting flashbacks, The Penguin has kept Oz and Sofia separated from each other for four full episodes at this point, after making a strong case for them being the most electric pairing on the show. Farrell, more than anybody else in this series, feeds off his scene partners, so the thought of these two facing off once and for all, possibly with Francis on the sidelines to roil things up, is genuinely thrilling."

Andy Andersen of Vulture gave the episode a 4 star rating out of 5 and wrote, "If Sofia the Hangman's horror origin story in episode four, “Cent'Anni,” made the case for The Penguin as an essential Gotham City tale, “Top Hat” will go down as the chapter that sealed the deal." Josh Rosenberg of Esquire wrote, "The Penguin is still out here slinging that Jersey accent and cozying up to Ma as if he isn't forty years older now. We can't have too much fun, though. HBO needs to remind viewers every now and then that the cool gangster we like to hang out with every week is not a good guy. Even at a young age, Oz was bad to the bone."

Joe George of Den of Geek gave the episode a 4 star rating out of 5 and wrote, "On a plot level, all of this makes sense, and is (somewhat) true to the Penguin's modern comic book origins. But on a thematic level, the flashbacks add nothing. Oz has always been cruel and manipulative? Oz caused his mother's pain? At his core, Oz is just a middle child who wants attention?" Nate Richard of Collider gave the episode an 8 out of 10 rating and wrote, ""Top Hat" begins by making us believe that the episode may be another flashback, this time about Oz's childhood. While that does take up a good portion of the story, including the flashback towards the end, the rest of the episode is pulse-pounding, stressful, and dreary. Salvatore Maroni's death may have felt a bit too anticlimactic, but that was clearly the intention."

Lisa Babick of TV Fanatic gave the episode a 4.3 star rating out of 5 rating and wrote, "Not that we could ever think it would be anything else, but “Top Hat” definitely sheds some brutal light on what made Oz, well... Oz. When Colin Farrell said a while back that by the end of The Penguin, we'd end up hating Oz, he wasn't kidding around." Chris Gallardo of Telltale TV gave the episode a 4.5 star rating out of 5 rating and wrote, "Though previous episodes, like “Gold Summit” and “Homecoming”, were particularly focused on moving the narrative, this one is different. Here, those threads finally weave themselves together not just to tie up loose ends, but to dig into their harsher selves. As a good way of putting it, “desperate times call for desperate measures.”"
