= Nathaniel Larouche =

Canadian visual effects artist

- Occupation: Visual effects artist
- Years active: 2009–present

Nathaniel Larouche is a Canadian visual effects artist. He won a Primetime Emmy Award in the category Outstanding Special Visual Effects for his work on the television program The Penguin.
