= Mirror Man (character) =

Mirror Man is the name of three different characters appearing in comic books published by DC Comics.

== Fictional character biography ==
=== Floyd Ventris ===
Mirror Man

Publication information
- Publisher: DC Comics
- First appearance: Detective Comics #213 (November 1954)
- Created by: Bill Finger (writer); Sheldon Moldoff (artist)

In-story information
- Alter ego: Floyd Ventris
- Species: Human
- Abilities: See-through device

Floyd Ventris is a criminal who was detained at Gotham State Penitentiary. Using broken mirror shards, he distracts the guards long enough to escape from prison. Inspired by the mirrors, he becomes Mirror Man. Upon creating a machine that would enable him to see through objects, Mirror Man began targeting Batman so that he can find out his secret identity. He was able to see under Batman's cowl and discover his identity of Bruce Wayne. Batman writes a letter to the Gotham Gazette about the times they thought he was falsely exposed as Bruce Wayne. This causes Mirror Man to try to get a similar image of Batman which fails as Mirror Man is defeated. When Mirror Man is incarcerated at Gotham State Penitentiary, Batman revealed that he used a special cowl made of mirrors which was the reason why Mirror Man failed to get another image of Batman's identity.

Mirror Man later escapes from prison and begins another plan to expose Bruce Wayne as the true identity of Batman. Bruce Wayne outwits Mirror Man's thugs at the Gotham Museum which is witnessed by Vicki Vale. Despite Batwoman's efforts to stop them, Mirror Man and his thugs escape. By Mirror Man's next attack, Vicki Vale hires an actor to pose as Bruce Wayne in order to keep Batman's identity a secret even though she was unaware that Bruce had asked Alfred Pennyworth to impersonate Batman. When one of Mirror Man's thugs uncovers Vicki's hoax, Mirror Man and his thugs are defeated by Batman and taken to GCPD Headquarters. Wayne appears at the police department causing Mirror Man's theory to be dropped.

Following the Crisis on Infinite Earths storyline, Mirror Man is among the villains freed from Gotham State Penitentiary by Ra's al Ghul. However, Ventris was one of the freed villains who chose not to take part in the mass attack on Batman staged by Ra's and instead went into hiding, and has not been seen since.

=== Second Mirror Man ===
The second Mirror Man, introduced in the miniseries Arkham Reborn, is an inmate of Arkham Asylum who is obsessed with mirrors and is also known as Narcissus.

=== Third Mirror Man ===
The third Mirror Man appears during the "Gotham Underground" storyline. He is an unnamed African-American man who is a member of the New Rogues and inspired by the Mirror Master.

During the Final Crisis storyline, Libra enlists the New Rogues to return the original Rogues to the Secret Society of Super Villains. He battles and is ultimately killed by the Mirror Master.

== Powers and abilities ==
The Floyd Ventris incarnation of Mirror Man has genius-level intellect and uses devices that are themed with mirrors.

The New Rogues incarnation of Mirror Man uses Mirror Master's special mirrors in battle.

== In other media ==
- A character based on Floyd Ventris named Lloyd Ventrix appears in the Batman: The Animated Series episode "See No Evil", voiced by Michael Gross. This version is an ex-criminal and lab assistant who became divorced from his wife Helen, lost custody of their daughter Kimberly, and possesses a stolen invisibility suit that gradually drives him insane.
- Mirror Man makes a non-speaking cameo appearance in the Batman: The Brave and the Bold episode "A Bat Divided!".
- Floyd Ventris makes a cameo appearance in The Penguin episode "Cent'Anni", portrayed by T. Ryder Smith. This version is the head doctor of Arkham State Hospital.
