= Kalina Ivanov =

Kalina Ivanov is a production designer and member of the Academy of Motion Picture Arts and Sciences.

== Early life and education ==
After emigrating to the United States from Bulgaria in 1979, Ivanov attended New York University's Tisch School of the Arts's Design Program, as well as the graduate film program, from which received an MFA.

== Career ==
Ivanov received an Emmy Award for Outstanding Art Direction for a Miniseries or Movie for her work on the film Grey Gardens (2009). In 2016 she became a member of the Academy of Motion Picture Arts and Sciences.
