= Nick Towne =

American television writer

- Occupation: Television Writer
- Writing career
- Notable work: Deadwood

Nick Towne is an American television writer. He has been nominated for a Writers Guild of America Award for his work on Deadwood .

== Biography ==
Towne joined the crew of HBO Western drama Deadwood as a writer's assistant for the second season in 2005. The series was created by David Milch and focuses on the growth of a settlement in the American West. Towne and the writing staff were nominated for a Writers Guild of America (WGA) Award for Outstanding Drama Series at the February 2006 ceremony for their work on the second season. Towne remained the writer's assistant for the third and final season in 2006 and also made his television writing debut. Towne co-wrote the episode "Amateur Night" with fellow assistant Zack Whedon. Towne and the writing staff were nominated for the WGA Award for Outstanding Drama Series at the February 2007 ceremony for their work on the third season.

Towne had a small acting role in the internet series Dr. Horrible's Sing-Along Blog. The series was created by Zack Whedon along with his brothers Joss Whedon and Jed Whedon.
