= Lauren LeFranc =

American television writer and producer

- Occupations: Television writer; producer; showrunner
- Years active: 2008–present
- Notable work: The Penguin

Lauren LeFranc is an American television writer, producer and showrunner known for her work on The Penguin (2024), a spin-off series set in the universe of Matt Reeves' film The Batman (2022).

== Career ==
In 2014, LeFranc worked on Agents of S.H.I.E.L.D. In 2018, she worked as one of the executive producers of Impulse, a YouTube Premium series based on the Jumper book series by Steven Gould. LeFranc joined the series after its pilot was directed by Doug Liman, serving as the showrunner throughout the series' run. In 2024 she produced and was the showrunner on The Penguin.

She was a featured panelist at an event held at YouTube Space, Los Angeles.

== Filmography ==
Television episodes written by Lauren LeFranc
Year	TV series	Episode	Ref.
2008	My Own Worst Enemy	"The Night Train to Moscow"	
2008	My Own Worst Enemy	"Henry and the Terrible, Horrible No Good Very Bad Day"	
2010	Chuck	"Chuck Versus the Tic Tac"	
2010	Chuck	"Chuck Versus the Honeymooners"	
2010	Chuck	"Chuck Versus the Living Dead"	
2010	Chuck	"Chuck Versus the Suitcase"	
2010	Chuck	"Chuck Versus the First Fight"	
2011	Chuck	"Chuck Versus the Push Mix"	
2011	Chuck	"Chuck Versus the Masquerade"	
2011	Chuck	"Chuck Versus the Wedding Planner"	
2011	Chuck	"Chuck Versus the Bearded Bandit"	
2011	Chuck	"Chuck Versus the Baby"	
2012	Chuck	"Chuck Versus Sarah"	
2013	Agents of S.H.I.E.L.D.	"The Hub"	
2014	Agents of S.H.I.E.L.D.	"T.R.A.C.K.S."	
2014	Agents of S.H.I.E.L.D.	"A Fractured House"	
2015	Agents of S.H.I.E.L.D.	"One Door Closes"	
2015	Agents of S.H.I.E.L.D.	"Scars"	
2015	Agents of S.H.I.E.L.D.	"Chaos Theory"	
2016	Agents of S.H.I.E.L.D.	"The Singularity"	
2018	Impulse	"State of Mind"	
2018	Impulse	"Awakening"	
2018	Impulse	"They Know Not What They Do"	
2018	Impulse	"New Beginnings"	
2019	Impulse	"Mind on Fire"	
2019	Impulse	"Making Amends"	
2024	The Penguin	"After Hours"	
2024	The Penguin	"A Great or Little Thing"	
