= List of DC Comics characters: V =

== V'lana ==
V'lana was an insurgent Queen of Xebel, an underwater kingdom located in Dimension Aqua. She opposed Queen Mera in a plot that resulted in her own death.

== Val-El ==
Val-El is a character appearing in American comic books published by DC Comics.. He first appears as a statue in Superboy #136 (January 1967), with his background being explored in Krypton Chronicles #1-2 (September–October 1981).

Val-El was a Kryptonian explorer and member of the House of El. He discovered the lands that would later become known as Bokos, Vathlo Island, and Lurvan.

A statue of Val-El holding a ship's wheel was erected and placed within the House of El family memorial vault on Krypton. The statues were transformed into kryptonite during Krypton's destruction before being coated with lead, which blocks the kryptonite radiation.

=== Val-El in other media ===
Val-El appears in Krypton, portrayed by Ian McElhinney. This version is a scientist, a member of the House of El, and Seg-El's grandfather. Later in the series, he becomes the leader of a resistance against General Zod.

== Valerie van Haaften ==
- First appearance: Superman (vol. 2) #187 (December 2002)
- Created by: Geoff Johns and Pascual Ferry
- Abilities: Body composed of living "puzzle pieces"
- Aliases: The Puzzler
- Further reading: Puzzler at the Comic Book DB (archived from the original); Puzzler at the Grand Comics Database

Valerie van Haaften is a supervillain in the DC Universe who took the name the Puzzler.

The character, created by Geoff Johns and Pascual Ferry, first appeared in Superman (vol. 2) #187 (December 2002).

Valerie van Haaften is a Superman fan who attempted to join a number of superhero groups in order to meet him. She eventually decides to become a villain called the Puzzler to get his attention. Later, she is hired by Intergang to assassinate Superman.

=== Powers and abilities of Valerie van Haaften ===
As the Puzzler, Valerie van Haaften's body was composed of living "puzzle pieces".

== John Vance ==
John Vance is a character appearing in American comic books published by DC Comics.

An earlier version of Batman Junior made one appearance in Detective Comics #231 (May 1956), in a story written by Edmond Hamilton, with art by Sheldon Moldoff. In the story, Batman Junior is John Vance, a boy who once helped Batman as his sidekick long before Robin (Dick Grayson at the time) had arrived. John re-enters Batman's life to solve yet another case, making Robin feel that he is about to be replaced. Apart from a reprint of the story in Batman #185 (October–November 1966), John Vance has not reappeared since.

== Fredric Vaux ==
- Further reading: Fredric Vaux at the Comic Book DB (archived from the original)

Fredric Vaux is a character appearing in American comic books published by DC Comics.. The character, created by Paul Levitz, first appeared in Adventure Comics #463.

Fredric Vaux is an enemy of the Justice Society of America.

== Brenda Del Vecchio ==
Brenda Del Vecchio is a character appearing in American comic books published by DC Comics. Created by writers Keith Giffen and John Rogers and artist Cully Hamner, she first appeared in Infinite Crisis #3 (February 2006).

Brenda Del Vecchio is a friend of Blue Beetle (Jaime Reyes) and Paco Testas, and the niece of the crime lord La Dama.

== Vincent Velcro ==
Vincent Velcro is a character appearing in American comic books published by DC Comics.

Vincent Velcro is a sergeant in the Royal Air Force. After being accused of treason, Velcro takes an offer to be subjected to Project M's experiments. He is injected with a compound containing the DNA of a vampire bat, transforming him into a "scientific approximation" of a vampire. Velcro goes on to join the Creature Commandos.

In 2011, "The New 52" rebooted the DC universe. In this continuity, Velcro obtained his powers from a modified version of the Man-Bat serum.

=== Vincent Velcro in other media ===
- Vincent Velcro appears in the Batman: The Brave and the Bold episode "Four Star Spectacular!", voiced by Dee Bradley Baker.
- Vincent Velcro appears in the "Creature Commandos" segment of DC Nation Shorts, voiced by Kevin Shinick.
- Vincent Velcro makes a non-speaking appearance in DC Showcase: Sgt. Rock.

== Vengeance ==
Vengeance is the name of several characters appearing in American comic books published by DC Comics.

=== Manhunter villain ===
The first Vengeance was a duo consisting of an unnamed professor and an unnamed woman who targeted the heirs of corrupt politician Jonah Dwyer. They ran afoul of Manhunter where the woman shot the professor. His dying breath had him mentioning to Manhunter that the woman was also in on it.

=== Green Arrow villain ===
The second Vengeance is a costumed vigilante who ran afoul of Green Arrow.

=== Clone of Bane ===
In a Santa Priscan laboratory, scientists use the DNA of Bane to create a female clone of him who took the name of Vengeance. When plotting her campaign following Bane's apparent death, Vengeance learned that she was a clone from Joker and decides to forge her own path..

== Vext ==
Vext is a character appearing in American comic books published by DC Comics. He was created by Keith Giffen and the star of a self-titled series published in 1999. The series was written by Giffen, pencilled by Mike McKone, inked by Mark McKenna, lettered by Bob Lappan, and colored by Lovern Kindzierski with separations by Digital Chameleon for all six issues (with guest inker Andy Lanning filling in on issue 4).

Vext is a god from the Jejune Realm (also known as the Borough of Mawkish Indifference) in the Pan-Dimensional Pantheons. He is the "patron deity of mishap and misfortune" and true to that appellation, his world was phased out of existence because he and the realm's deities were no longer actively worshipped. From childhood, Vext has been beset by misfortune, accidentally causing the fall of man and the sinking of the RMS Titanic.

After the Jejune Realm is destroyed, it takes 23 years for its gods to be processed. Vext is evicted to a random realm, which turns out to be Earth. He is given sufficient funds to start a new life and not much training. He is told he cannot interfere with the course of human affairs, try to take over Earth, or become a superhero.

Vext rents an apartment in Delta City, which is also the home of a hero known as the Heckler. Vext's next-door neighbor is aspiring writer Colleen McBride, who does her best to help Vext adjust to his life on Earth, not knowing that he is a god.

== Vicious ==
Vicious is a criminal who is an expert at wielding knives and daggers. She is recruited to be a member of a mercenary team called the Ravens alongside Pistolera.

Vicious later appears as a member of Alexander Luthor Jr.'s Secret Society of Super Villains.

== Viking Prince ==
The Viking Prince (Jon Haraldson) is a character appearing in comic books published by DC Comics. The character first appeared in The Brave and the Bold #1 (August 1955), and was created by writer Robert Kanigher and artist Joe Kubert.

In The Brave and the Bold #1, the main character is found amnesiac, on a beach by 10th century Scandinavian fishermen, who name him "Jon" after a legendary prince. His enemy Thorvald knows his true identity and wants to kill him before he regains his memory or meets someone else who recognizes him. This set-up is ignored by later writers, some of whom make no mention of his background, while others portray him as an actual prince, the son of King Rikk.

In Our Army at War #162-163 (January - February 1966), Sergeant Rock finds the Viking Prince in a glacier and frees him. Jon reveals that he previously fell in love with a valkyrie, resulting in Odin banishing him from Valhalla and telling him that he could only return if he died a heroic death. However, Odin was crafty and cursed Jon with invulnerability to all known weapons. Jon ends up being killed by a plastique explosive, which did not exist at the time the curse was made.

=== Viking Prince in other media ===
- Jon Haraldson appears in the Justice League Unlimited episode "To Another Shore". This version disappeared after traveling the world in a failed attempt to seek death, with his body ending up in an iceberg in the present day. After the Secret Society attempts to retrieve Jon's body and reverse-engineer his invulnerability, the Justice League gives Jon a Viking funeral by sending him and his ship into the sun to prevent him from being exploited.
- The Viking Prince appears as a character summon in Scribblenauts Unmasked: A DC Comics Adventure.
- The Viking Prince appears in Batman: The Brave and the Bold #6.

== Virtue ==
Virtue is a superheroine in DC Comics. She first appeared in The Movement #1 (July 2013), and was created by Gail Simone and Freddie Williams II.

Holly Fields is a member of the eponymous Movement and a metahuman who can manipulate and draw power from emotions. This enables Virtue to increase her physical strength, fly, and become intangible.

=== Virtue in other media ===
An original incarnation of Virtue, Cecile Horton, appears in the ninth season of The Flash, portrayed by Danielle Nicolet.

== Carla Viti ==
Carla Viti is Carmine Falcone's sister and leads the Falcone family in Chicago. She is the mother of Johnny Viti and Lucia Viti. Carla was later killed by Holiday.

=== Carla Viti in other media ===
Carla Viti appears in The Penguin, portrayed by Aleksa Palladino. This version is the cousin of Isabella Falcone, the mother of Gia (portrayed by Kenzie Grey), and a friend of Sofia Falcone. After learning that Carla helped Sofia's father Carmine frame her for the murders of several women, Sofia kills her while Gia is taken to Brookside Children's Home by a social worker.

== Johnny Viti ==
Johnny Viti is the nephew of Carmine Falcone, working as an enforcer for the Falcone crime family.

=== Johnny Viti in other media ===
- Johnny Viti appears in The Penguin, portrayed by Michael Kelly. This version is Carmine Falcone's cousin-in-law who is later killed by Sofia Falcone.
- Johnny Viti appears in Batman: Year One.
- Johnny Viti appears in Batman: The Long Halloween.
