= Rhenzy Feliz =

American actor

- Born: The Bronx, New York, U.S.
- Occupations: Actor, singer
- Years active: 2016–present
- Mother: Joelis Vallejo

Rhenzy Feliz is an American actor, who is best known for playing Alex Wilder in the Marvel Cinematic Universe television series Runaways, voicing Camilo Madrigal in Disney's 2021 animated feature film Encanto, and playing Victor Aguilar in the HBO series The Penguin.

== Life and career ==
Feliz was born in The Bronx to a single mother. He soon moved and grew up in Florida. After his mother remarried, they moved to Los Angeles and he attended Santa Monica High School where he focused on Drama as he gained an interest in it. He and his team were finalists in the 2016 August Wilson Monologue Competition and The Music Center's Spotlight Program where he gained recognition. Feliz performed a monologue from the play Two Trains Running.

In 2017, Feliz landed the role of Alex Wilder in Marvel's Runaways. He made a guest appearance on Kevin (Probably) Saves the World as Marc, "a young man who has left home in search of adventure".

In 2021, Feliz voiced the character of Camilo Madrigal in Disney's animated feature film Encanto.

In 2024, Feliz starred as Victor Aguilar, a troubled youth, in the HBO Max series The Penguin, in which he starred opposite Colin Farrell.

== Filmography ==
=== Film ===
Year	Title	Role	Notes
2020	All Together Now	Ty	
2021	The Same Storm	Jose Sera	
2021	The Tender Bar	Wesley	
2021	Encanto	Camilo Madrigal (voice)	
2025	The Mastermind	Gordon	
2026	How to Rob a Bank	Hugo	
2026	Bad Day †		Post-production
TBA	Porto Rico †		Filming

=== Television ===
Year	Title	Role	Episodes
2016	Casual	Spencer	Recurring role (season 2)
2017	Teen Wolf	Aaron	Recurring role (season 6)
2017–2019	Marvel's Runaways	Alex Wilder	Main role
2018	Kevin (Probably) Saves the World	Marc	Episode: "Old Friends"
2021	American Horror Stories	Chad	Episode: "Drive-In"
2024	The Penguin	Victor Aguilar	Main role
2024	Penelope	Peter	2 episodes

== Discography ==
=== Charted songs ===
List of charted songs, with year released, selected chart positions, and album name shown
Title	Year	Peak chart positions										Certifications	Album
Title	Year	US	AUS	CAN	GER	IRE	NLD	NZ	SWE	UK	WW	Certifications	Album
"We Don't Talk About Bruno" (with Carolina Gaitán, Mauro Castillo, Adassa, Diane Guerrero, and Stephanie Beatriz)	2021	1	5	3	71	1	41	4	40	1	1	RIAA: 2× Platinum; ARIA: Platinum; BPI: 2× Platinum; MC: Gold	Encanto
