= Sofia Falcone =

DC Comics character

- Sofia Falcone in Batman: Dark Victory #1 (December 1999). Art by Tim Sale.

Publication information
- Publisher: DC Comics
- First appearance: Batman: The Long Halloween #6 (May 1997)
- Created by: Jeph Loeb; Tim Sale

In-story information
- Full name: Sofia Falcone
- Species: Human
- Notable aliases: The Hangman

Sofia Falcone, also known as Sofia Gigante, is a fictional character appearing in DC Comics, primarily in association with the character Batman. Debuting in the 1996–97 comic book limited series Batman: The Long Halloween by Jeph Loeb and Tim Sale, she is introduced as a member of the Falcone crime family, who assists her father Carmine Falcone in unearthing the identity of the "Holiday Killer", a serial killer who had been killing Gotham City's citizens in correlation with holidays in the yearly calendar.

In the 1999–2000 limited series Batman: Dark Victory which served as a continuation of the arc established in The Long Halloween, Sofia is revealed as the identity behind the murderer known under the alias the Hangman, who had spent over a year targeting and eliminating various members of the Gotham City Police Department, notably in association with former district attorney-turned criminal, Harvey Dent / Two-Face, who ends up killing her during a lengthy confrontation with Batman himself.

The character made her live-action debut in the 2017–2018 fourth season of the television series Gotham, portrayed by Crystal Reed. She also appears in the 2024 HBO television miniseries The Penguin set in The Batman shared universe, portrayed by Cristin Milioti. Milioti’s performance was universally praised and won the Critics' Choice Television Award for Best Actress in a Movie/Miniseries and the Primetime Emmy Award for Outstanding Lead Actress in a Limited or Anthology Series or Movie.

== Publication history ==
Sofia Falcone first appeared in Jeph Loeb and Tim Sale's 1996 miniseries Batman: The Long Halloween as the daughter of crime lord Carmine Falcone. She returned in the sequel Batman: Dark Victory, where she became the Hangman killer to avenge her father's death.

Loeb stated in an interview that he paralleled the Falcone family to that of the Corleone family, with Sofia's temper matching that of Sonny Corleone.

== Fictional character biography ==
=== The Long Halloween ===
When the Holiday Killer started killing members of the Falcone family, Carmine has his daughter Sofia released from prison early to help him find who the killer was.

In the end, the killer was apparently revealed to be Alberto Falcone, Carmine's son and Sofia's brother. Afterwards, Carmine was killed by Gotham's district attorney Harvey Dent, who became Two-Face after having his face splashed with acid, and Sofia fell out of the Falcone's penthouse window after being attacked by Catwoman.

=== Dark Victory ===
Sofia is revealed to have survived her fall, now in a wheelchair and wearing a neck brace, and is the new head of the Falcone family. Meanwhile, a new serial killer known as the Hangman is killing the cops of Gotham City with a noose, striking on holidays and leaving an incomplete hangman puzzle with each victim. The first half of the year, the victims are all cops who in some way assisted in Harvey Dent's rise to power in Gotham before he became Two-Face, while from April Fool's onwards the victims are all part of the task force Gordon has assembled to investigate the hangman killings.

In the end, Sofia is revealed to be the killer, having faked her paralysis. She kills her brother Alberto for being a "disappointment" to the family, and then tries to kill Two-Face, but Batman stops her. While she is battling him, Two-Face shoots her in the head.

== In other media ==
=== Television ===
- Sofia Falcone appears in the fourth season of Gotham, portrayed by Crystal Reed.
- Sofia Falcone appears in The Penguin, portrayed by Cristin Milioti. For her performance, Milioti earned an Emmy award as well as a Critic's Choice Award and a Golden Globe nomination.
- Sofia Falcone appears in Teen Titans Go!, voiced by Tara Strong.

=== Film ===
Sofia Falcone appears in Batman: The Long Halloween, Part Two, voiced by Laila Berzins.

=== Video games ===
Sofia Falcone appears in Lego Batman: Legacy of the Dark Knight.

== See also ==
- List of Batman family enemies
