= 77th Primetime Creative Arts Emmy Awards =

2025 American television programming awards for creative arts

- Date: September 6–7, 2025
- Presented by: Academy of Television Arts & Sciences
- Most awards: The Studio (9)
- Most nominations: Severance; The Penguin (17)

Television/radio coverage
- Network: FXX
- Produced by: Bob Bain
- Directed by: Richard Preuss

The 77th Primetime Creative Arts Emmy Awards honored the best in artistic and technical achievement in American prime time television programming from June 1, 2024, until May 31, 2025, as chosen by the Academy of Television Arts & Sciences. The awards were presented on September 6 and 7, 2025, at the Peacock Theater in Downtown Los Angeles, California. A total of 101 Creative Arts Emmys were presented across 97 categories. The ceremonies were broadcast in the United States by FXX on September 13.

The Studio won nine awards, leading all programs; The Penguin followed with eight awards. The Penguin also tied with Severance for the most nominations, with each receiving 17. Overall program awards went to Adolescence: The Making of Adolescence, Arcane, Conan O'Brien: The Kennedy Center Mark Twain Prize for American Humor, Conan O'Brien Must Go, The Daily Show: Desi Lydic Foxsplains, Jeopardy!, Love on the Spectrum, 100 Foot Wave, Queer Eye, Patrice: The Movie, Pee-wee as Himself, Rebel Ridge, SNL 50th The Anniversary Special: Immersive Experience, and White Rabbit. Among networks and platforms Netflix earned the most awards with 24 wins; HBO and its sister streaming service HBO Max received the most nominations with 104.

== Winners and nominees ==
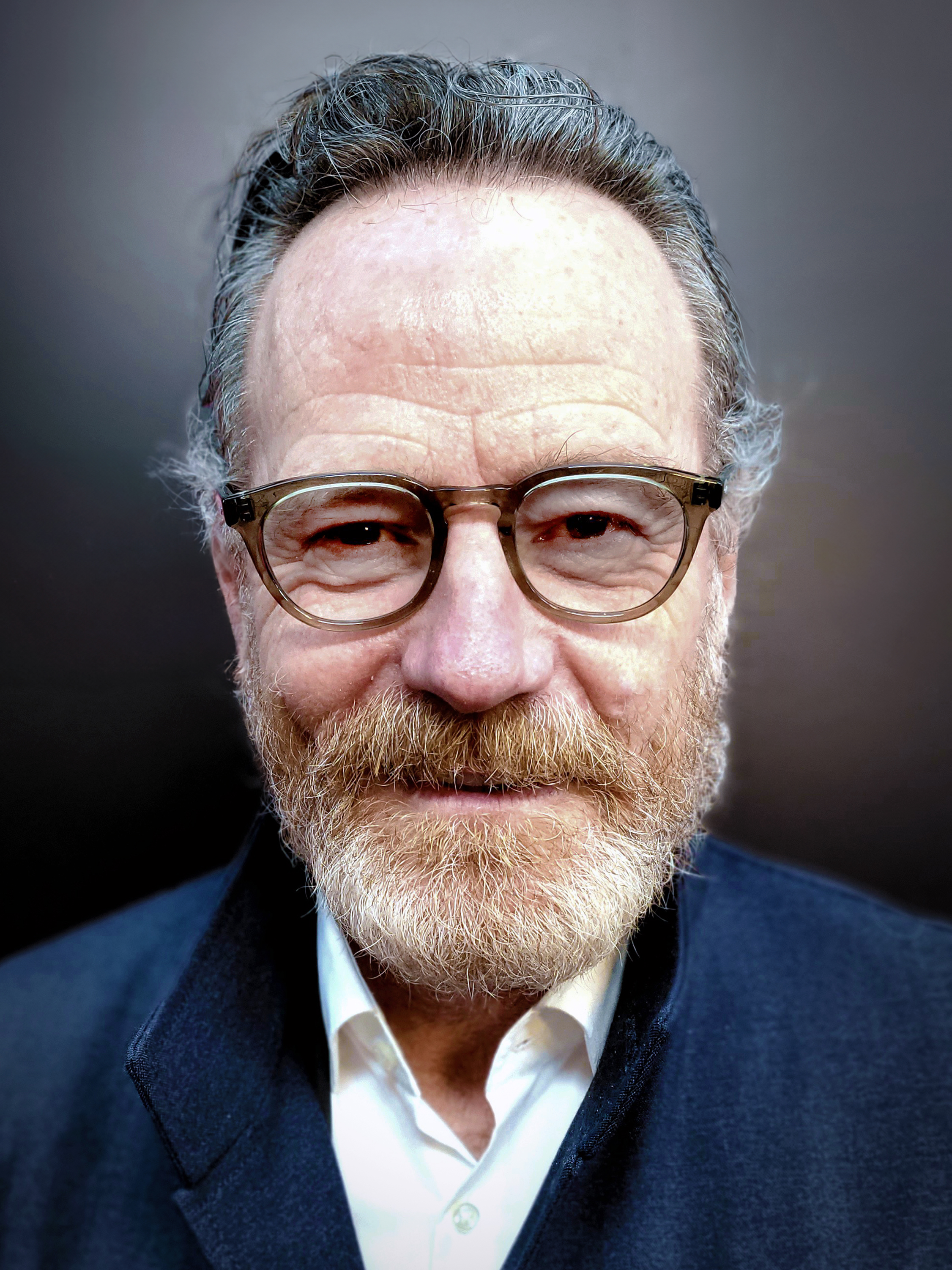
Bryan Cranston, Outstanding Guest Actor in a Comedy Series winner

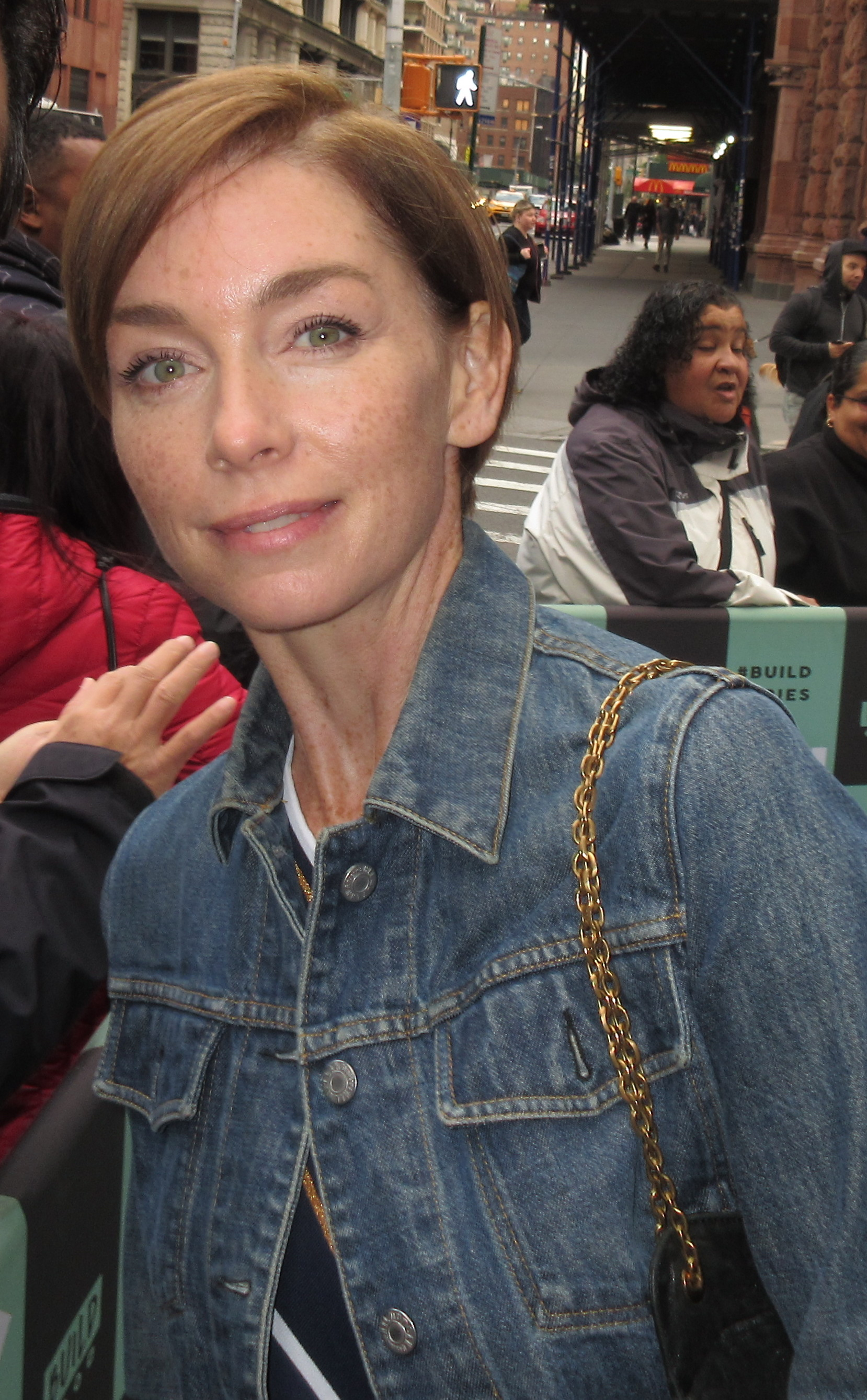
Julianne Nicholson, Outstanding Guest Actress in a Comedy Series winner

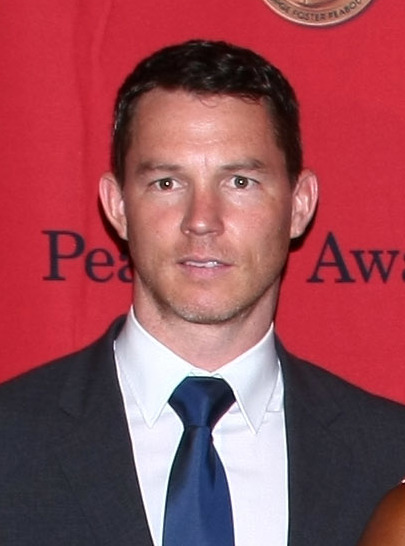
Shawn Hatosy, Outstanding Guest Actor in a Drama Series winner

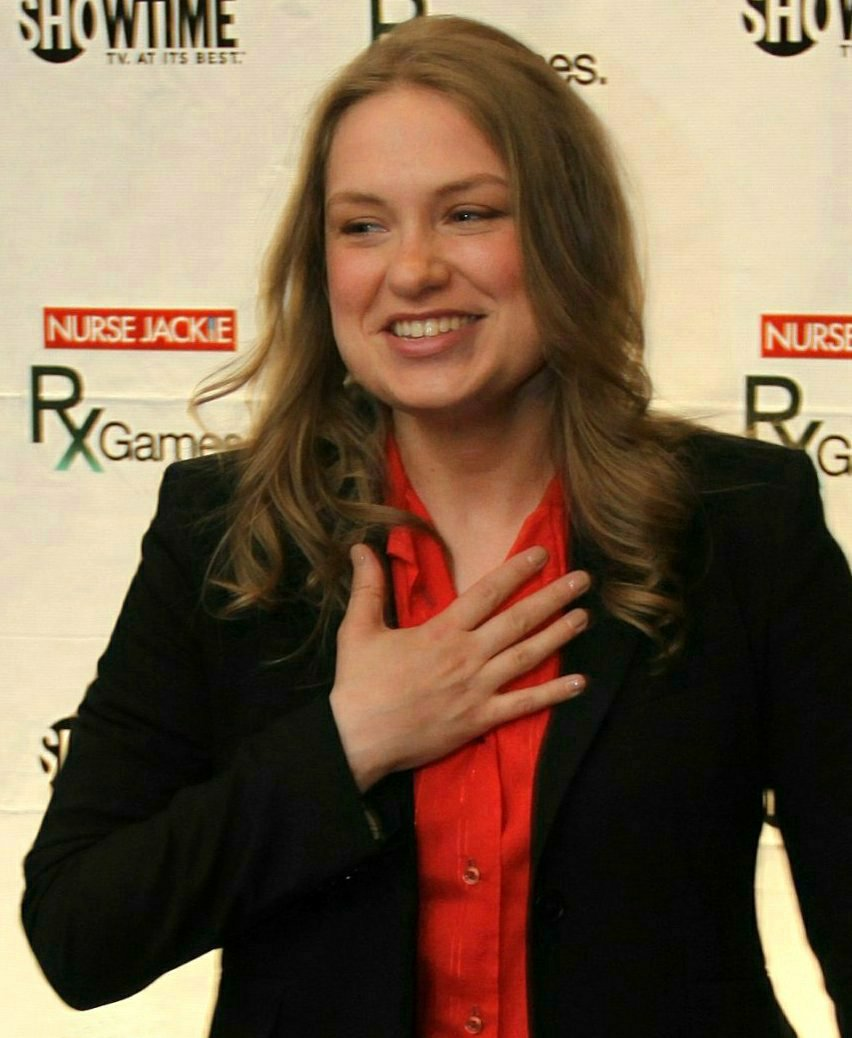
Merritt Wever, Outstanding Guest Actress in a Drama Series winner

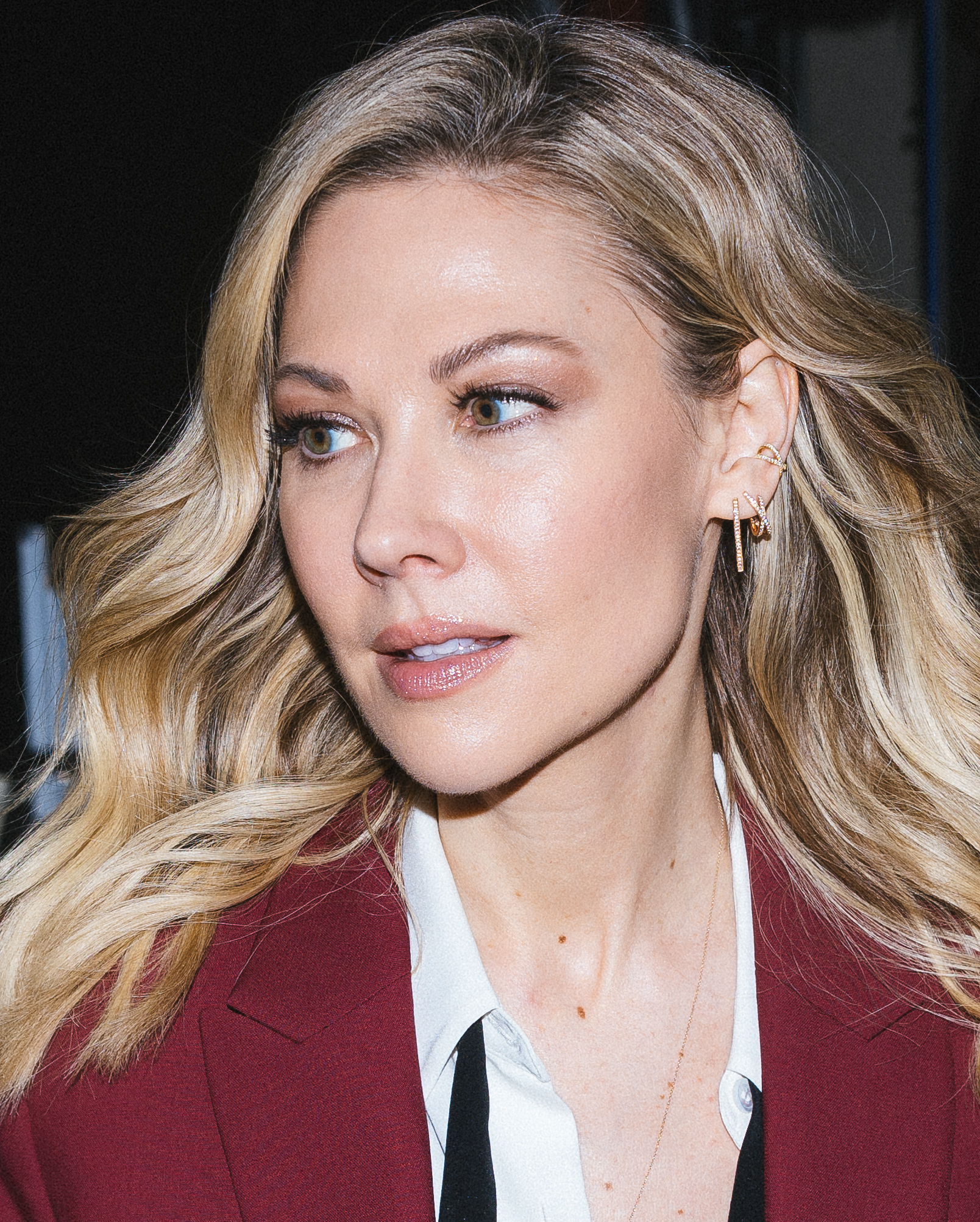
Desi Lydic, Outstanding Performer in a Short Form Comedy or Drama Series winner

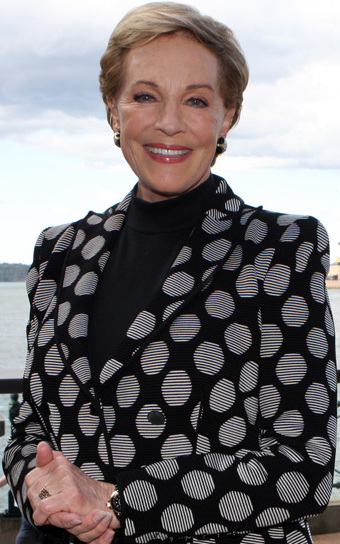
Julie Andrews, Outstanding Character Voice-Over Performance winner

Barack Obama, Outstanding Narrator winner

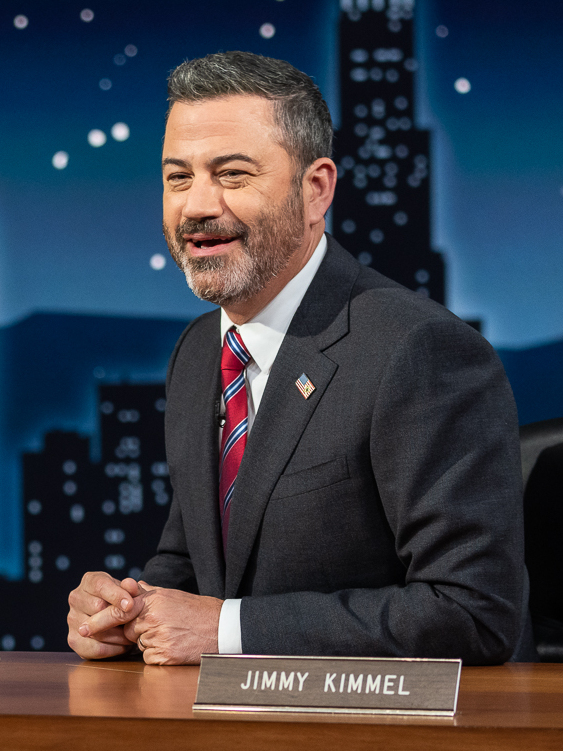
Jimmy Kimmel, Outstanding Host for a Game Show winner

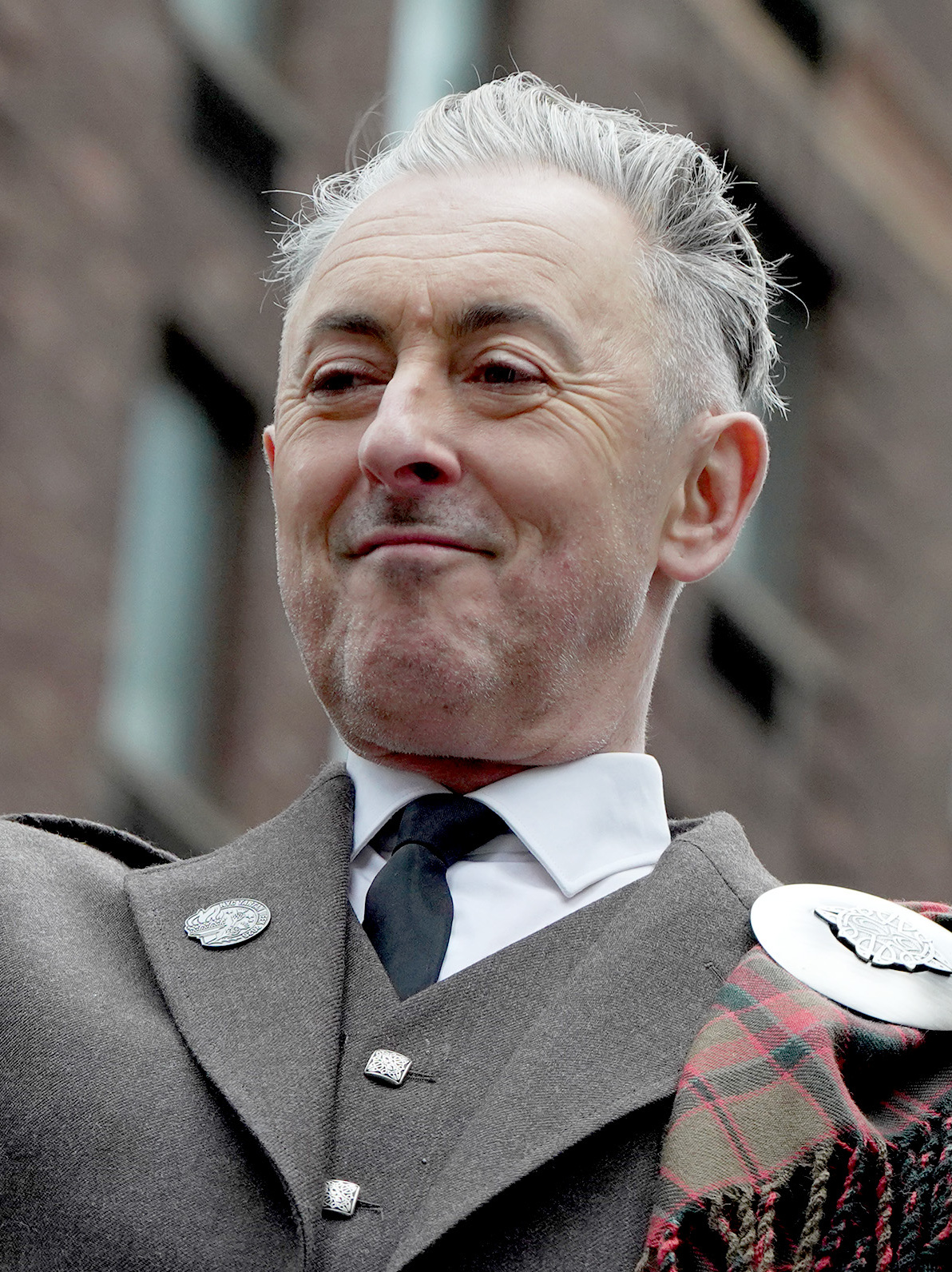
Alan Cumming, Outstanding Host for a Reality or Reality Competition Program winner

Winners are listed first, highlighted in boldface, and indicated with a double dagger (‡). (Note: The outlets listed for each program are the U.S. broadcasters or streaming services identified in the nominations, which for some international productions are different than the broadcaster(s) that originally commissioned the program. Programs broadcast by HBO or HBO Max were listed under both services in the nominations list; only the original broadcaster is listed below.) Sections are based upon the categories listed in the 2024–2025 Emmy rules and procedures. Area awards and juried awards are denoted next to the category names as applicable. (Note: Area awards are non-competitive; any nominee with at least 90% approval receives an Emmy. If no nominee receives 90% approval, the nominee with the highest approval receives an Emmy; for area awards in picture editing and sound mixing, there is an additional requirement that the highest-rated nominee must have at least 50% approval.; Juried awards generally do not have nominations; instead, all entrants are screened before members of the appropriate peer group, and one, more than one, or no entry is awarded an Emmy based on the jury's vote.) For simplicity, producers who received nominations for program awards have been omitted.

=== Programs ===
**Outstanding Television Movie**: **Rebel Ridge (Netflix)**‡; Bridget Jones: Mad About the Boy (Peacock); The Gorge (Apple TV+); Mountainhead (HBO); Nonnas (Netflix)	**Outstanding Variety Special (Pre-Recorded)**: **Conan O'Brien: The Kennedy Center Mark Twain Prize for American Humor (Netflix)**‡; Adam Sandler: Love You (Netflix); Ali Wong: Single Lady (Netflix); Bill Burr: Drop Dead Years (Hulu); Sarah Silverman: PostMortem (Netflix); Your Friend, Nate Bargatze (Netflix)
**Outstanding Game Show**: **Jeopardy! (ABC / Syndicated)**‡; Celebrity Family Feud (ABC); The Price Is Right (CBS); Wheel of Fortune (ABC / Syndicated); Who Wants to Be a Millionaire (ABC)	**Outstanding Animated Program**: **Arcane: "The Dirt Under Your Nails" (Netflix)**‡; Bob's Burgers: "They Slug Horses, Don't They?" (Fox); Common Side Effects: "Cliff's Edge" (Adult Swim); Love, Death & Robots: "Spider Rose" (Netflix); The Simpsons: "Bart's Birthday" (Fox)
**Outstanding Structured Reality Program**: **Queer Eye (Netflix)**‡; Antiques Roadshow (PBS); Diners, Drive-Ins and Dives (Food Network); Love Is Blind (Netflix); Shark Tank (ABC)	**Outstanding Unstructured Reality Program**: **Love on the Spectrum (Netflix)**‡; America's Sweethearts: Dallas Cowboys Cheerleaders (Netflix); RuPaul's Drag Race: Untucked (MTV); The Secret Lives of Mormon Wives (Hulu); Welcome to Wrexham (FX)
**Outstanding Documentary or Nonfiction Series**: **100 Foot Wave (HBO)**‡; Chef's Table (Netflix); Simone Biles Rising (Netflix); SNL50: Beyond Saturday Night (Peacock); Social Studies (FX)	**Outstanding Documentary or Nonfiction Special**: **Pee-wee as Himself (HBO)**‡; Deaf President Now! (Apple TV+); Martha (Netflix); Sly Lives! (aka The Burden of Black Genius) (Hulu); Will & Harper (Netflix)
**Outstanding Hosted Nonfiction Series or Special**: **Conan O'Brien Must Go (HBO Max)**‡; The Daily Show Presents: Jordan Klepper Fingers the Pulse: MAGA: The Next Generation (Comedy Central); Finding Your Roots with Henry Louis Gates, Jr. (PBS); My Next Guest Needs No Introduction with David Letterman (Netflix); Tucci in Italy (Nat Geo)	**Exceptional Merit in Documentary Filmmaking (Juried)**: **Patrice: The Movie (Hulu)**‡; I Am: Celine Dion (Prime Video); The Remarkable Life of Ibelin (Netflix)
**Outstanding Short Form Comedy, Drama or Variety Series**: **The Daily Show: Desi Lydic Foxsplains (YouTube)**‡; Late Night with Seth Meyers: Corrections (NBC); The Rabbit Hole with Jimmy Kimmel (YouTube); The Tonight Show: During Commercial Break (YouTube)	**Outstanding Short Form Nonfiction or Reality Series**: **Adolescence: The Making of Adolescence (Netflix)**‡; Hacks: Bit by Bit (HBO Max); Making of: The Last of Us (HBO); Only Murders in the Building: Unlocking the Mystery (Hulu); The White Lotus: Unpacking the Episode (HBO)
**Outstanding Emerging Media Program**: **SNL 50th The Anniversary Special: Immersive Experience (Meta Quest)**‡; Impulse: Playing with Reality (Meta); Shawn Mendes: Red Rocks Live in VR (Meta Quest)	**Outstanding Innovation in Emerging Media Programming (Juried)**: **White Rabbit (Shibuya.film)**‡

=== Performing ===
**Outstanding Guest Actor in a Comedy Series**: **Bryan Cranston – The Studio: "CinemaCon" as Griffin Mill (Apple TV+)**‡; Jon Bernthal – The Bear: "Napkins" as Michael Berzatto (FX); Dave Franco – The Studio: "CinemaCon" as himself (Apple TV+); Ron Howard – The Studio: "The Note" as himself (Apple TV+); Anthony Mackie – The Studio: "The Note" as himself (Apple TV+); Martin Scorsese – The Studio: "The Promotion" as himself (Apple TV+)	**Outstanding Guest Actress in a Comedy Series**: **Julianne Nicholson – Hacks: "A Slippery Slope" as Dance Mom (HBO Max)**‡; Olivia Colman – The Bear: "Forever" as Chef Terry (FX); Jamie Lee Curtis – The Bear: "Ice Chips" as Donna Berzatto (FX); Cynthia Erivo – Poker Face: "The Game Is a Foot" as the Kazinsky sisters (Peacock); Robby Hoffman – Hacks: "Cover Girls" as Randi (HBO Max); Zoë Kravitz – The Studio: "The Presentation" as herself (Apple TV+)
**Outstanding Guest Actor in a Drama Series**: **Shawn Hatosy – The Pitt: "9:00 P.M." as Dr. Jack Abbot (HBO Max)**‡; Giancarlo Esposito – The Boys: "Beware the Jabberwock, My Son" as Stan Edgar (Prime Video); Scott Glenn – The White Lotus: "Killer Instincts" as Jim Hollinger (HBO); Joe Pantoliano – The Last of Us: "The Price" as Eugene (HBO); Forest Whitaker – Andor: "I Have Friends Everywhere" as Saw Gerrera (Disney+); Jeffrey Wright – The Last of Us: "Day One" as Isaac (HBO)	**Outstanding Guest Actress in a Drama Series**: **Merritt Wever – Severance: "Who Is Alive?" as Gretchen George (Apple TV+)**‡; Jane Alexander – Severance: "Sweet Vitriol" as Celestine "Sissy" Cobel (Apple TV+); Gwendoline Christie – Severance: "Cold Harbor" as Lorne (Apple TV+); Kaitlyn Dever – The Last of Us: "Through the Valley" as Abby (HBO); Cherry Jones – The Handmaid's Tale: "Exile" as Holly (Hulu); Catherine O'Hara – The Last of Us: "Future Days" as Gail (HBO)
**Outstanding Performer in a Short Form Comedy or Drama Series**: **Desi Lydic – The Daily Show: Desi Lydic Foxsplains as herself (YouTube)**‡; Nathalie Emmanuel – Die Hart: Hart to Kill as Jordan King (The Roku Channel); Kevin Hart – Die Hart: Hart to Kill as himself (The Roku Channel); Tom Segura – Bad Thoughts as various Characters (Netflix); J. K. Simmons – Die Hart: Hart to Kill as Jackson Pepper (The Roku Channel)	**Outstanding Character Voice-Over Performance**: **Julie Andrews – Bridgerton: "Into the Light" as Lady Whistledown (Netflix)**‡; Hank Azaria – The Simpsons: "Abe League of Their Moe" as Moe Szyslak (Fox); Maya Rudolph – Big Mouth: "Why Do We Go Through Puberty?" as Connie the Hormone Monstress (Netflix); Alan Tudyk – Andor: "Who Else Knows?" as K-2SO (Disney+); Jeffrey Wright – What If...?: "What If... 1872?" as The Watcher (Disney+); Steven Yeun – Invincible: "What Have I Done?" as Mark Grayson / Invincible (Prime Video)
**Outstanding Narrator**: **Barack Obama – Our Oceans: "Indian Ocean" (Netflix)**‡; David Attenborough – Planet Earth: Asia: "The Frozen North" (BBC America); Idris Elba – Erased: WW2's Heroes of Color: "D-Day" (Nat Geo); Tom Hanks – The Americas: "The Andes" (NBC); Phoebe Waller-Bridge – Octopus!: "Part 1" (Prime Video)	**Outstanding Host for a Game Show**: **Jimmy Kimmel – Who Wants to Be a Millionaire (ABC)**‡; Elizabeth Banks – Press Your Luck (ABC); Steve Harvey – Celebrity Family Feud (ABC); Ken Jennings – Jeopardy! (ABC / Syndicated); Colin Jost – Pop Culture Jeopardy! (Prime Video)
**Outstanding Host for a Reality or Reality Competition Program**: **Alan Cumming – The Traitors (Peacock)**‡; RuPaul Charles – RuPaul's Drag Race (MTV); Mark Cuban, Lori Greiner, Kevin O'Leary, Barbara Corcoran, Robert Herjavec, Daymond John and Daniel Lubetzky – Shark Tank (ABC); Kristen Kish – Top Chef (Bravo); Jeff Probst – Survivor (CBS)

=== Animation ===
**Outstanding Individual Achievement in Animation (Juried)**
- **Arcane: "The Dirt Under Your Nails" – Bruno Couchinho (Netflix)**‡
- **Arcane: "The Message Hidden Within the Pattern" – Faustine Dumontier (Netflix)**‡
- **Love, Death & Robots: "400 Boys" – Daryl Graham (Netflix)**‡
- **Love, Death & Robots: "400 Boys" – Robert Valley (Netflix)**‡
- **Love, Death & Robots: "How Zeke Got Religion" – Gigi Cavenago (Netflix)**‡
- **Love, Death & Robots: "How Zeke Got Religion" – Edgar Martins (Netflix)**‡

=== Art Direction ===
**Outstanding Production Design for a Narrative Contemporary Program (One Hour or More)**: **Severance: "Chikhai Bardo" – Jeremy Hindle, Chris Shriver, Ann Bartek, and David Schlesinger (Apple TV+)**‡; The Last of Us: "Day One" – Don MacAulay, David Clarke, Jonathan Lancaster, and Lisa Lancaster (HBO); The Penguin: "Homecoming" – Kalina Ivanov, Deborah Wheatley, Rich Murray, and Richard Devine (HBO); The Residence: "The Fall of the House of Usher" – François Audouy, A. Todd Holland, and Halina Siwolop (Netflix); The White Lotus: "Amor Fati" – Cristina Onori, Jeremy Woolsey, and Letizia Santucci (HBO)	**Outstanding Production Design for a Narrative Period or Fantasy Program (One Hour or More)**: **Andor: "Who Are You?" – Luke Hull, Toby Britton, and Rebecca Alleway (Disney+)**‡; Bridgerton: "Romancing Mister Bridgerton" – Alison Gartshore, Antony Cartlidge, and Natalie Papageorgiadis (Netflix); Dune: Prophecy: "The Hidden Hand" – Tom Meyer, Guy Potgieter, and Carolyn Loucks (HBO); 1923: "Wrap Thee in Terror" – Cary White, Lisa Ward, Sean Ryan Jennings, and Carla Curry (Paramount+); Pachinko: "Chapter Thirteen" – Ruth Ammon, Larry Spittle, Eric Jeon, and Ann Victoria Smart (Apple TV+)
**Outstanding Production Design for a Narrative Program (Half-Hour)**: **The Studio: "The Note" – Julie Berghoff, Brian Grego, and Claire Kaufman (Apple TV+)**‡; Hacks: "A Slippery Slope" – Rob Tokarz, Jeanine Ringer, and Jennifer Lukehart (HBO Max); Mid-Century Modern: "Working Girls" – Greg Grande, Sam Kramer, and Peter Gurski (Hulu); Only Murders in the Building: "Gates of Heaven" / "Valley of the Dolls" – Patrick Howe, Casey Smith, and Mila Khalevich (Hulu); What We Do in the Shadows: "Headhunting" – Shayne Fox, Hayley Isaacs, Aaron Noël, and Kerri Wylie (FX)	**Outstanding Production Design for a Variety or Reality Series**: **Saturday Night Live: "Host: Lady Gaga" – Akira Yoshimura, Keith Ian Raywood, N. Joseph DeTullio, Andrea Purcigliotti, Patrick Lynch, and Sara Parks (NBC)**‡; The Daily Show: "Jon Stewart & the News Team Live at the Chicago DNC" – Dave Edwards and Lauren Browning (Comedy Central); Jimmy Kimmel Live!: "The Chanucorn & Hawk Tuah Girl's Romantic Holiday Movie; Ft. Nikki Glaser, Nicholas Hoult, and Musical Guest Broadway Musical: "The Outsiders"" / "MAGA Elf on a Shelf; Ft. Josh Brolin, Clarence Maclin, and Musical Guest Raye" / "Jimmy Kimmel's Aunt Chippy Meets Oscar the Grouch; Ft. Justin Theroux, Antoni Porowski and Musical Guest Sia" – David Ellis, Hillarie Brigode, and Heidi Miller (ABC); Last Week Tonight with John Oliver: "Mass Deportations" – Eric Morrell, Hugh Zeigler, and Amanda Carzoli (HBO); RuPaul's Drag Race: "RDR Live!" – Jen Chu and Gavin Smith (MTV)
**Outstanding Production Design for a Variety Special**: **The Oscars – Misty Buckley, Alana Billingsley, John Zuiker, and Margaux Lapresle (ABC)**‡; Beyoncé Bowl – Willo Perron, Brian Stonestreet, Gloria Lamb, Jonathan Stoller-Schoff, and Marina Skye (Netflix); The 67th Annual Grammy Awards – Julio Himede, Kristen Merlino, Gloria Lamb, Ellen Jaworski, Margaux Lapresle, and Kaydee Lavorin (CBS); SNL50: The Anniversary Special – Akira Yoshimura, N. Joseph DeTullio, Patrick Lynch, Melissa Shakun, Charlotte Hayes Harrison, and Sabrina Lederer (NBC); SNL50: The Homecoming Concert – Keith Ian Raywood, Anthony Bishop, and Aaron Black (Peacock)

=== Casting ===
**Outstanding Casting for a Comedy Series**: **The Studio – Melissa Kostenbauder and Francine Maisler (Apple TV+)**‡; The Bear – Jeanie Bacharach, Maggie Bacharach, Jennifer Rudnicke, and Mickie Paskal (FX); Hacks – Linda Lowy and Morgan Smith (HBO Max); Only Murders in the Building – Bernard Telsey, Tiffany Little Canfield, and Destiny Lilly (Hulu); Shrinking – Debby Romano and Brett Benner (Apple TV+)	**Outstanding Casting for a Drama Series**: **The Pitt – Cathy Sandrich Gelfond and Erica Berger (HBO Max)**‡; The Last of Us – Mary Vernieu, Lindsay Graham Ahanonu, Sydney Shircliff, Corinne Clark, and Jennifer Page (HBO); Severance – Rachel Tenner and Bess Fifer (Apple TV+); Slow Horses – Nina Gold and Melissa Gethin Clarke (Apple TV+); The White Lotus – Meredith Tucker and Non Jungmeier (HBO)
**Outstanding Casting for a Limited or Anthology Series or Movie**: **Adolescence – Shaheen Baig (Netflix)**‡; Black Mirror – Jina Jay, Jeanie Bacharach, Corinne Clark, and Jennifer Page (Netflix); Dying for Sex – Jeanie Bacharach and Jessica Daniels (FX); Monsters: The Lyle and Erik Menendez Story – Tiffany Little Canfield, Josh Einsohn, and Bernard Telsey (Netflix); The Penguin – Cindy Tolan and Suzanne Ryan (HBO)	**Outstanding Casting for a Reality Program**: **Love on the Spectrum – Cian O'Clery, Sean Bowman, and Emma Choate (Netflix)**; The Amazing Race – Jesse Tannenbaum, Alex Stiner, Kayla Kellerbauer, Pollyanna Jacobs and Pedro Gomez (CBS); Queer Eye – Danielle Gervais, Jessica Jorgenson, Natalie Pino, and Brian Puentes (Netflix); RuPaul's Drag Race – Goloka Bolte, Adam Cook, and Michelle Redwine (MTV); Survivor – Jesse Tannenbaum, Caitlin Moore, Penni Lane Clifton, Daniel Gradias, Lisa Visagie and Christian Estrada (CBS)

=== Choreography ===
**Outstanding Choreography for Variety or Reality Programming (Juried)**: **The 67th Annual Grammy Awards: "Doechii Musical Performance" – Robbie Blue (CBS)**‡; The Apple Music Super Bowl LIX Halftime Show Starring Kendrick Lamar: "Humble" / "Not Like Us" – Charm La'Donna (Fox); Beyoncé Bowl: "My House" / "Sweet Honey Bucklin'" / "Texas Hold 'Em" – Truck Patterson, Charm La'Donna, Christopher Grant, and Parris Goebel (Netflix); The Lion King at the Hollywood Bowl: "He Lives in You" – Jamal Sims (Disney+); The Oscars: "James Bond Tribute Performance" / "Quincy Jones Tribute Performance" – Mandy Moore (ABC)	**Outstanding Choreography for Scripted Programming (Juried)**: **Étoile – "Piece 2" / "Growing Pressure" / "Big in Japan" / "Piece 1" – Marguerite Derricks (Prime Video)**‡; Bridgerton: "Butterfly Ball" / "Eros and Psyche" / "Jealousy" / "Wedding Dance" / "Rejoining the Ton" – Sean "Jack" Murphy (Netflix); Doctor Who: "There's Always a Twist" – Jack Murphy (Disney+); Severance: "Choreography & Merriment" / "The Ballad of Ambrose and Gunnel" – Andrew Turteltaub (Apple TV+); Will Trent: "Last Dance" / "In the Night" / "Quartet No. 5" / "I Can't Stand the Rain" – Danielle Sten and Lance Guillermo (ABC)

=== Cinematography ===
**Outstanding Cinematography for a Series (Half-Hour)**: **The Studio: "The Oner" – Adam Newport-Berra (Apple TV+)**‡; Emily in Paris: "Masquerade" – Seamus Tierney (Netflix); Georgie & Mandy's First Marriage: "The 6:10 to Lubbock" – Buzz Feitshans IV (CBS); Hacks: "I Love LA" – Adam Bricker (HBO Max); The Righteous Gemstones: "Prelude" – Paul Daley (HBO)	**Outstanding Cinematography for a Series (One Hour)**: **Severance: "Hello, Ms. Cobel" – Jessica Lee Gagné (Apple TV+)**‡; Andor: "Harvest" – Christophe Nuyens (Disney+); The Day of the Jackal: "Episode 1" – Christopher Ross (Peacock); Étoile: "The Swap" – M. David Mullen (Prime Video); Pachinko: "Chapter Nine" – Ante Cheng (Apple TV+); The White Lotus: "Killer Instincts" – Ben Kutchins (HBO)
**Outstanding Cinematography for a Limited or Anthology Series or Movie**: **Adolescence: "Episode 2" – Matthew Lewis (Netflix)**‡; American Primeval: "Episode 1" – Jacques Jouffret (Netflix); Disclaimer: "I" – Emmanuel Lubezki and Bruno Delbonnel (Apple TV+); The Penguin: "Top Hat" – David Franco (HBO); Zero Day: "Episode 6" – John Conroy (Netflix)	**Outstanding Cinematography for a Nonfiction Program**: **100 Foot Wave: "Chapter III: Cortes Bank" – Vincent Kardasik, Alexandre Lesbats, Chris Smith, Laurent Pujol, Michael Darrigade, and Karl Sandrock (HBO)**‡; Chef's Table: "Jamie Oliver" – Adam Bricker (Netflix); Ren Faire: "Daddy's Dyin', Who's Got the Will?" – Nate Hurtsellers (HBO); Tucci in Italy: "Tuscany" – Matt Ball (Nat Geo); Will & Harper – Zoë White (Netflix)
**Outstanding Cinematography for a Reality Program**: **The Traitors – Siggi Rosen-Rawlings, Matt Wright, Jack Booth, Alex Bruno, Ned Ellis-Jones, Ollie Green, Quin Jessop, Guy Linton, Joshua Montague, Paul Rudge, James Spencer, Matt Thomson, Alex Took, and Melvin Wright (Peacock)**‡; The Amazing Race – Joshua Gitersonke, Bryan T. Adams, Kathryn Barrows, Kurt Carpenter, Petr Cikhart, Stephen A. Coleman, David D'Angelo, Matthew Di Girolamo, Adam Haisinger, Jamie Holland, Kevin R. Johnson, Jay Kaufman, Ian Kerr, Tim Laks, Regan Letourneau, Danny Long, Lucas Kenna Mertes, Ryan Shaw, Will Shipp, Holly Thompson, and Alan Weeks (CBS); Life Below Zero – Michael Cheeseman, Danny Day, Jason Hubbell, Ben Mullin, Charlie Beck, Dwayne Fowler, Jensen Walker, Brian Bitterfeld, Jeffrey Alexander, Tyler Colgan, Ashton Hurlburt, Jayce Kolinski and Wayne Shockey (Nat Geo); Love on the Spectrum: "Episode 7" – Dave May and Cian O'Clery (Netflix); Survivor – Peter Wery, Scott Duncan, Russ Fill, Cullum Andrews, Tim Barker, Marc Bennett, James Boon, Paulo Castillo, Rodney Chauvin, Chris Ellison, Ben Gamble, Nixon George, Marcus Hebbelmann, Derek Hoffmann, Matthias Hoffmann, Toby Hogan, Derek Holt, Efrain "Mofi" Laguna, Kyle McAuley, Ian Miller, Nico Nyoni, Paul Peddinghaus, Louis Powell, Thomas Pretorius, Erick Sarmiento, Dirk Steyn, John Tattersall, Holly Thompson, Paulo Velozo, Christopher Barker, Granger Scholtz, Nic Van Der Westhuizen, Dwight Winston, and Kenny Hoffmann (CBS)

=== Commercial ===
**Outstanding Commercial**
- **"Brian Cox Goes to College" – O Positive and Special US (Uber One for Students)**‡
  - "Batman vs. Bateman" – Hungry Man and Highdive (State Farm)
  - "The Boy & The Octopus" – Hungry Man and adam&eveDDB (Disney)
  - "Flock" – Smuggler and TBWA\ Media Arts Lab (Apple Privacy)
  - "Heartstrings" – Smuggler and TBWA\ Media Arts Lab (Apple AirPods Pro)
  - "So Win." – Somesuch and Wieden+Kennedy (Nike)

=== Costumes ===
**Outstanding Period Costumes**: **Bridgerton: "Into the Light" – John Glaser, Amanda McLaughlan, Dougie Hawkes, George Sayer, and Anthony Brookman (Netflix)**‡; American Primeval: "Episode 2" – Virginia B. Johnson, Donna Casey Aira, Tonya Barrett, Mila Hermanovski, Susan Leung, and April McCoy (Netflix); Monsters: The Lyle and Erik Menendez Story: "Blame It On the Rain" – Paula Bradley, Michelle Sandvig, and Shannon Campbell (Netflix); 1923: "A Dream and A Memory" – Janie Bryant, Gaby Acosta, Jaclyn Tamizato, Kelly Chambers, and Megan Guthrie-Wedemeyer (Paramount+); Wolf Hall: The Mirror and the Light: "Wreckage" – Joanna Eatwell, Havva Buckles, and Clare Vyse (PBS)	**Outstanding Fantasy/Sci-Fi Costumes**: **Andor: "Harvest" – Michael Wilkinson, Kate O'Farrell, Richard Davies, and Paula Fajardo (Disney+)**‡; Agatha All Along: "Follow Me My Friend / To Glory at the End" – Daniel Selon, Ambre Wrigley, Christine Casaus, Maddison Carroll, Marilyn Madsen, and Greg Hopwood (Disney+); Black Mirror: "USS Callister: Into Infinity" – Matthew Price, Lisa Mittion, Alice Woodward, Jennifer Geach, and Calum Alexander Watt (Netflix); Dune: Prophecy: "The Hidden Hand" – Bojana Nikitović, Gábor Homonnay, and Srdjan Perić (HBO); House of the Dragon: "The Burning Mill" – Caroline McCall, Joanna Lynch, Poli Kyriacou, Aaron Timperley, and Isabelle Conaghan (HBO)
**Outstanding Contemporary Costumes for a Limited or Anthology Series or Movie**: **The Penguin: "A Great or Little Thing" – Helen Huang, Kate Smith, Austin Wittick, Becca Freund, and Esther J. Han (HBO)**‡; Adolescence: "Episode 2" – Jessica Schofield, William Maher, and Tracey Cliffe (Netflix); American Horror Stories: "Backrooms" – Sara O'Donnell, Laura McCarthy, Alyssa Bracken, and Ashley Holvick (FX); Dying for Sex: "Topping is a Sacred Skill" – Melissa Toth, Kenn Hamilton, Caroline Quiroga, Christine Rumery, and David Burnett (FX); Sirens: "Exile" – Caroline Duncan, Paul Thompson, Tricia Barsamian, Heather Breen, and Sarah Babcot (Netflix)	**Outstanding Contemporary Costumes for a Series**: **The Studio: "CinemaCon" – Kameron Lennox, Betsy Glick, and Tyle Kinney (Apple TV+)**‡; Emily in Paris: "The Grey Area" – Marylin Fitoussi, Chloé Bartonio, and Herehau Ragonneau (Netflix); Hacks: "Heaven" – Kathleen Felix-Hager and Keely Crum (HBO Max); The Righteous Gemstones: "You Hurled Me into the Depths, Into the Very Heart of the Seas" – Christina Flannery, Elizabeth Tagg, Maura Cusick, and Aughra Moon (HBO); The White Lotus: "Same Spirits, New Forms" – Alex Bovaird, Eileen Sieff Stroup, Preeyanan 'Lin' Suwannathada, Brian Sprouse, and Giulia Moschioni (HBO)
**Outstanding Costumes for Variety, Nonfiction, or Reality Programming (Juried)**: **Beyoncé Bowl – Beyoncé Knowles-Carter, Shiona Turini, Erica Rice, Molly Peters, Chelsea Staebell, and Timothy White (Netflix)**‡

=== Directing ===
**Outstanding Directing for a Variety Series**: **The Late Show with Stephen Colbert: "David Oyelowo, Finn Wolfhard, Special Appearance by Alan Cumming, Performance by Ok Go" – Jim Hoskinson (CBS)**‡; The Daily Show: "Jon Stewart Delivers a Mug-Smashing Take on Musk's DOGE" – David Paul Meyer (Comedy Central); Jimmy Kimmel Live!: "Anthony Mackie, Lizzy Caplan, and Musical Guest Bartees Strange" – Andy Fisher (ABC); Last Week Tonight with John Oliver: "India Elections" – Paul Pennolino (HBO)	**Outstanding Directing for a Variety Special**: **SNL50: The Anniversary Special – Liz Patrick (NBC)**‡; The Apple Music Super Bowl LIX Halftime Show Starring Kendrick Lamar – Hamish Hamilton (Fox); Beyoncé Bowl – Beyoncé Knowles-Carter and Alex Rudzinski (Netflix); The Oscars – Hamish Hamilton (ABC); SNL50: The Homecoming Concert – Beth McCarthy-Miller (Peacock); 77th Annual Tony Awards – Glenn Weiss (CBS)
**Outstanding Directing for a Documentary/Nonfiction Program**: **Pee-wee as Himself – Matt Wolf (HBO)**‡; Deaf President Now! – Nyle DiMarco and Davis Guggenheim (Apple TV+); Ladies & Gentlemen... 50 Years of SNL Music – Ahmir "Questlove" Thompson and Oz Rodríguez (NBC); Super/Man: The Christopher Reeve Story – Ian Bonhôte and Peter Ettedgui (HBO); Will & Harper – Josh Greenbaum (Netflix)	**Outstanding Directing for a Reality Program**: **The Traitors: "Let Battle Commence" – Ben Archard (Peacock)**‡; The Amazing Race: "It Smells Like the Desert" – Bertram van Munster (CBS); Love on the Spectrum: "Episode 7" – Cian O'Clery (Netflix); RuPaul's Drag Race: "Squirrel Games" – Nick Murray (MTV); Top Chef: "Foraged in Fire" – Ariel Boles (Bravo)

=== Hairstyling ===
**Outstanding Contemporary Hairstyling**: **The Penguin: "Cent'Anni" – Brian Badie, Jenn Vasilopoulos, and Mariko Miyagi (HBO)**‡; Abbott Elementary: "100th Day of School" – Moira Frazier, Dustin Osborne, Christina Joseph, Charolette Noon, and Natita Stribling (ABC); Emily in Paris: "Back on the Crazy Horse" – Carole Nicolas, Miharu Oshima, Mike Désir, Julien Parizet, and Stéphane Delahaye (Netflix); Hacks: "I Love LA" – Aubrey Marie, Becca Weber, Marva Stokes, Alexis Sade Stafford, and Jennifer Bell (HBO Max); The Studio: "CinemaCon" – Vanessa Price, Alexandra Ford, and Lauren McKeever (Apple TV+); The White Lotus: "Amor Fati" – Miia Kovero, Derrick Anthony Spruill, Punchaya "Nern" Phorang, Teresa Hinton, and Sudjai 'Jaiko' Tangsiripracha (HBO)	**Outstanding Period or Fantasy/Sci-Fi Hairstyling**: **Bridgerton: "Old Friends" – Erika Okvist, Farida Ghwedar, Grace Stella Gorman, and Laura Sim (Netflix)**‡; Anne Rice's Interview with the Vampire: "No Pain" – Francesco Pegoretti, Marica Falso, and Elena Fabbiani (AMC); House of the Dragon: "Smallfolk" – Rosalia Culora, Stacey Johnson, Kashiya Hinds, Tania Couper, Sarah Spears, and Ella Burton (HBO); Monsters: The Lyle and Erik Menendez Story: "Hang Men" – Karen Bartek, Brittany Madrigal, Elissa Ruminer, Analyn Cruz, and Kaity Licina (Netflix); What We Do in the Shadows: "The Finale" – Tamara Harrod, Amanda Nestico, and Regan Noble (FX)
**Outstanding Hairstyling for a Variety, Nonfiction or Reality Program (Juried)**: **SNL50: The Anniversary Special – Jodi Mancuso, Cara Hannah, Inga Thrasher, Amanda Duffy Evans, Chad Harlow, Gina Ferrucci, Brittany Hartman, and Katie Beatty (NBC)**‡; American Idol: "Finale" – Dean Banowetz, Amber Maher, Cory Rotenberg, Ryan Randall, Kathleen Leonard, Theresa K. Casillas, Lorenzo Martin, and Jayson Stacy (ABC); The Boulet Brothers' Dragula: "Welcome to Hell" – Marco Gabellini (Shudder); Dancing with the Stars: "Halloween Nightmares" – Kimi Messina, Joe Matke, Marion Rogers, Amber Maher, Florence Witherspoon, Brittany Spaulding, and Melanie Ervin (ABC); Fantasmas: "The Void" – Amber Jasmin Morrow, Allison Imoto-Suh, and Naomi Indira (HBO); The Voice: "Live Semi-Final Performances" – Jerilynn Stephens, Darbie Wieczorek, Marion Rogers, Kathleen Leonard, Dominique Diaz, and Conrad Hilton (NBC)

=== Lighting Design / Lighting Direction ===
**Outstanding Lighting Design / Lighting Direction for a Series**: **Saturday Night Live: "Host: Lady Gaga" – Geoffrey Amoral, Rick McGuinness, William McGuinness, Trevor Brown, Tim Stasse, Frank Grisanti, and Reginald Campbell (NBC)**‡; American Idol: "Songs of Faith" – Tom Sutherland, James Coldicott, Hunter Selby, Andrew Law, Nathan Files, Chris Roseli, Matt McAdam, Luke Chantrell, and Ed Moore (ABC); Dancing with the Stars: "Semi-Finals" – Noah Mitz, Madigan Stehly, Patrick Brazil, Joe Holdman, Matt Benson, Matt McAdam, Ed Moore, and Kevin Faust (ABC); RuPaul's Drag Race: "The Wicked Wiz Of Oz: The Rusical!" – Gus Dominguez and Steve Moreno (MTV); The Voice: "Live Finale (Part 1)" – Oscar Dominguez, Ronald Wirsgalla, Erin Anderson, Vanessa Arciga, Andrew Munie, Jeff Shood, and Terrance Ho (NBC)	**Outstanding Lighting Design / Lighting Direction for a Special**: **The 67th Annual Grammy Awards – Noah Mitz, Andy O'Reilly, Patrick Boozer, Ryan Tanker, Erin Anderson, Madigan Stehly, William Gossett, Bryan Klunder, Hannah Kerman, Matt Benson, Matthew Cotter, Guy Jones, and Kevin Faust (CBS)**‡; 2024 Rock & Roll Hall Of Fame Induction Ceremony – Allen Branton, Felix Peralta, Kevin Lawson, George Gountas, Bianca Moncada, Alex Flores, Guy Jones, and J.C. Castro (ABC); SNL50: The Anniversary Special – Geoffrey Amoral, Rick McGuinness, William McGuinness, Trevor Brown, Tim Stasse, Frank Grisanti, and Reginald Campbell (NBC); SNL50: The Homecoming Concert – Tom Sutherland, Harry Forster, Hunter Selby, Bobby Grey, Ryan Tanker, Chris Roseli, Matt Cotter, JM Hurley, and Bob Benedetti (Peacock)

=== Main Title and Motion Design ===
**Outstanding Title Design**: **Severance – Oliver Latta and Teddy Blanks (Apple TV+)**‡; Dark Matter – Ronnie Koff, Charlie Proctor, Alex Braddock, and Lexi Gunvaldson (Apple TV+); The Decameron – Mark Bashore, Katrina Crawford, Jason Esser, Torin Bashore, Harry Teitelman, and Mauro Gimferrer Alos (Netflix); House of the Dragon – Garson Yu, Mulan Leong-Suzuki, James Robertson, Damian Stricker, Dan Tegnelia, and Gregory Jones (HBO); The Penguin – Aaron Becker, Joseph Ahn, Michael Lo, James Robertson, Hsien Lun Su, Alasdair Willson, and Ben Hurand (HBO); The White Lotus – Katrina Crawford, Mark Bashore, Mauro Gimferrer, and Marcos Coral (HBO)	**Outstanding Motion Design (Juried)**: **Octopus! – Michaela Olsen, Hayley Morris, Julie Gratz, Anthony Galante, Minkyung Chung, and Sabrina Chaney (Prime Video)**‡

=== Makeup ===
**Outstanding Contemporary Makeup (Non-Prosthetic)**: **The Penguin: "Cent'Anni" – Martha Melendez, Kim Collea, and Maria Maio (HBO)**‡; Grotesquerie: "Unplugged" – Kate Biscoe, Tierra Richards, Victor Del Castillo, and Naima Jamal (FX); The Last of Us: "Day One" – Rebecca Lee, Krystal Devlin, Amber Trudeau, Leslie Graham, Jessica Wong, and Chelsea Matthews (HBO); Only Murders in the Building: "Valley of the Dolls" – Arielle Toelke, Kim Taylor, Joelle Troisi, and Ana Sorys (Hulu); The Pitt: "7:00 P.M." – Merry Lee Traum, Marie-Flore 'Ri' Beaubien, and Leesa Simone (HBO Max); The White Lotus: "Full-Moon Party" – Rebecca Hickey, Michelle Kearns, Wattana 'Geng' Garum, Vicky Nugent, Jeersak 'Jojo' Srinuan, Jibbie Avarin Phanvichian (HBO)	**Outstanding Period or Fantasy/Sci-Fi Makeup (Non-Prosthetic)**: **House of the Dragon: "The Red Dragon and the Gold" – Amanda Knight, Sara Kramer, Harriet Thompson, Bonny Monger, Helen Currie, Natalie Wickens, and Vickie Ellis (HBO)**‡; Anne Rice's Interview with the Vampire: "Do You Know What It Means to Be Loved by Death" – Vincenzo Mastrantonio, Daniele Nastasi, Adele Di Trani, and Charlene Williams (AMC); Monsters: The Lyle and Erik Menendez Story: "Brother, Can You Spare a Dime?" – Miho Suzuki, Sabrina Wilson, Michael Anthony Ornelaz, and Ana Lozano (Netflix); The Righteous Gemstones: "Prelude" – Leigh Ann Yandle, Nataleigh Verrengia, Alexander McPherson, and Lori McCoy-Bell (HBO); What We Do in the Shadows: "Come Out and Play" – Sarah Milk, Lorna Thibodeau, Cherie Snow, and Heather Holett-French (FX)
**Outstanding Makeup for a Variety, Nonfiction or Reality Program**: **SNL50: The Anniversary Special – Louie Zakarian, Jason Milani, Amy Tagliamonti, Rachel Pagani, Young Bek, Stephen Kelley, and Joanna Pisani (NBC)**‡; The Boulet Brothers' Dragula: "Welcome to Hell" – The Boulet Brothers (Shudder); Dancing with the Stars: "Halloween Nightmares" – Zena S. Green, Julie Socash, Donna Bard, Lois Harriman, Brian Sipe, James MacKinnon, Tyson Fountaine, and Angela Moos (ABC); The Lion King at the Hollywood Bowl – Bruce Grayson, Jill Cady, Brielle McKenna, James MacKinnon, Rochelle Uribe, Tyson Fountaine, and Angela Wells (Disney+); A Nonsense Christmas with Sabrina Carpenter – Diana Oh, Vanessa Dionne, Alicia Carbajal, Ashley Joy Beck, and Carolina Gonzalez (Netflix); RuPaul's Drag Race: "Bitch, I'm a Drag Queen!" – Natasha Marcelina, David Petruschin, Jen Fregozo, and Nicole Faulkner (MTV)	**Outstanding Prosthetic Makeup**: **The Penguin: "After Hours" – Mike Marino, Mike Fontaine, Crystal Jurado, Diana Choi, Claire Flewin, Jerry Constantine, Yoichi Art Sakamoto, and Bobby Diehl (HBO)**‡; House of the Dragon: "The Red Sowing" – Waldo Mason, Claire Cameron, Heather McMullen, Emma Faulkes, and Hannah Eccleston (HBO); The Last of Us: "Feel Her Love" – Paul Spateri, Barrie Gower, Lucy Pittard, Johnny Murphy, Colum Mangan, Gillian Jarvis, Sarah Pickersgill, and Chris Devitt (HBO); The Pitt: "4:00 P.M." – Myriam Arougheti, Thom Floutz, Chris Burgoyne, and Martina Sykes (HBO Max); Saturday Night Live: "Timothée Chalamet" – Louie Zakarian, Jason Milani, Amy Tagliamonti, Stephen Kelley, Brandon Grether, Tom Denier Jr., and Craig Lindberg (NBC)

=== Music ===
**Outstanding Music Composition for a Series (Original Dramatic Score)**: **Severance: "Cold Harbor" – Theodore Shapiro (Apple TV+)**‡; Andor: "Who Are You?" – Brandon Roberts (Disney+); Based on a True Story: "Relapse" – Sherri Chung (Peacock); Cobra Kai: "Blood In Blood Out" – Leo Birenberg and Zach Robinson (Netflix); The Studio: "The Missing Reel" – Antonio Sánchez (Apple TV+); The White Lotus: "Amor Fati" – Cristobal Tapia de Veer (HBO)	**Outstanding Music Composition for a Limited or Anthology Series, Movie or Special (Original Dramatic Score)**: **The Penguin: "After Hours" – Mick Giacchino (HBO)**‡; Black Mirror: "Hotel Reverie" – Ariel Marx (Netflix); Black Mirror: "USS Callister: Into Infinity" – Daniel Pemberton (Netflix); Dying for Sex: "It's Not That Serious" – Ariel Marx (FX); Monsters: The Lyle and Erik Menendez Story: "Spree" – Thomas Newman and Julia Newman (Netflix); The Supremes at Earl's All-You-Can-Eat – Kathryn Bostic (Hulu)
**Outstanding Music Composition for a Documentary Series or Special (Original Dramatic Score)**: **Chef's Table: "José Andrés" – Duncan Thum and David Bertok (Netflix)**‡; The Americas: "Andes" – Hans Zimmer, Anže Rozman and Kara Talve (NBC); Leonardo da Vinci – Caroline Shaw (PBS); Planet Earth: Asia: "Beneath the Waves" – Jacob Shea and Laurentia Editha (BBC America); Super/Man: The Christopher Reeve Story – Ilan Eshkeri (HBO Max)	**Outstanding Music Direction**: **The Apple Music Super Bowl LIX Halftime Show Starring Kendrick Lamar – Kendrick Lamar and Tony Russell (Fox)**‡; The Kennedy Center Honors – Rickey Minor (CBS); The Oscars – Michael Bearden (ABC); SNL50: The Anniversary Special – Lenny Pickett, Leon Pendarvis and Eli Brueggemann (NBC); SNL50: The Homecoming Concert – James Poyser and Ahmir "Questlove" Thompson (Peacock)
**Outstanding Original Music and Lyrics**: **The Boys: "We'll Keep the Red Flag Flying Here" – "Let's Put the Christ Back in Christmas" by Christopher Lennertz (Prime Video)**‡; Agatha All Along: "Circle Sewn with Fate / Unlock Thy Hidden Gate" – "The Ballad of the Witches' Road" by Kristen Anderson-Lopez and Robert Lopez (Disney+); Andor: "Who Are You?" – "We Are the Ghor (Planetary Anthem)" by Nicholas Britell and Tony Gilroy (Disney+); SNL50: Anniversary Special – "50 Years" by Dan Bulla and Adam Sandler (NBC); Will & Harper – "Harper and Will Go West" by Sean Douglas, Kristen Wiig and Josh Greenbaum (Netflix)	**Outstanding Original Main Title Theme Music**: **The White Lotus – Cristobal Tapia de Veer (HBO)**‡; Dept. Q – Carlos Rafael Rivera and Scott Frank (Netflix); Dune: Prophecy – Volker Bertelmann (HBO); Lazarus – Kamasi Washington (Adult Swim); The Residence – Mark Mothersbaugh (Netflix); Your Friends & Neighbors – Dominic Lewis and Hamilton Leithauser (Apple TV+)
**Outstanding Music Supervision**: **The Studio: "The Promotion" – Gabe Hilfer (Apple TV+)**‡; Hacks: "I Love LA" – Matt Biffa (HBO Max); The Last of Us: "The Price" – Evyen Klean, Ian Broucek and Scott Hanau (HBO); The Righteous Gemstones: "You Hurled Me Into the Very Heart of the Seas" – DeVoe Yates and Gabe Hilfer (HBO); Severance: "Cold Harbor" – George Drakoulias (Apple TV+); The White Lotus: "Same Spirits, New Forms" – Gabe Hilfer (HBO)

=== Picture Editing ===
**Outstanding Picture Editing for a Drama Series**: **Andor: "Who Are You?" – Yan Miles (Disney+)**‡; The Last of Us: "Through the Valley" – Timothy A. Good (HBO); Severance: "Attila" – Joseph Landauer (Apple TV+); Severance: "Chikhai Bardo" – Keith Fraase (Apple TV+); Severance: "Cold Harbor" – Geoffrey Richman (Apple TV+); The White Lotus: "Amor Fati" – John M. Valerio and Scott Turner (HBO)	**Outstanding Picture Editing for a Multi-Camera Comedy Series**: **Frasier: "My Brilliant Sister" – Russell Griffin (Paramount+)**‡; The Conners: "The Truck Stops Here" – Brian Schnuckel (ABC); Mid-Century Modern: "Here's to You, Mrs. Schneiderman" – Peter J. Chakos (Hulu); The Upshaws: "Buy Now" – Brian LeCoz and Angel Gamboa Bryant (Netflix); The Upshaws: "Grifter, Grifter" – Angel Gamboa Bryant (Netflix)
**Outstanding Picture Editing for a Single-Camera Comedy Series**: **The Studio: "The Promotion" – Eric Kissack (Apple TV+)**‡; The Bear: "Tomorrow" – Joanna Naugle (FX); Hacks: "I Love LA" – Susan Vaill (HBO Max); The Rehearsal: "My Controls" – Adam Locke-Norton (HBO); The Rehearsal: "Pilot's Code" – Stacy Moon (HBO); What We Do in the Shadows: "The Finale" – Yana Gorskaya and Dane McMaster (FX)	**Outstanding Picture Editing for a Limited or Anthology Series or Movie**: **Monsters: The Lyle and Erik Menendez Story: "Blame It on the Rain" – Peggy Tachdjian (Netflix)**‡; The Penguin: "Bliss" – Andy Keir (HBO); The Penguin: "Cent'Anni" – Meg Reticker (HBO); The Penguin: "A Great or Little Thing" – Henk Van Eeghen (HBO); Sirens: "Exile" – Catherine Haight (Netflix)
**Outstanding Picture Editing for Variety Programming**: **Cunk on Life – Damon Tai and Jason Boxall (Netflix)**‡; Ali Wong: Single Lady – Sean Hubbert (Netflix); Bill Burr: Drop Dead Years – Kelly Lyon (Hulu); Conan O'Brien: The Kennedy Center Mark Twain Prize for American Humor – Bill DeRonde and Timothy Schultz (Netflix); Your Friend, Nate Bargatze – Sean Hubbert (Netflix)	**Outstanding Picture Editing for Variety Programming (Segment)**: **SNL50: The Anniversary Special: "Physical Comedy" – Ryan Spears, Paul Del Gesso, Christopher Salerno, Daniel Garcia, Sean McIlraith, and Ryan McIlraith (NBC)**‡; The Daily Show: "The Dailyshowography of Kamala Harris: Just Normal" – Lauren Beckett Jackson (Comedy Central); The Daily Show: "The Dailyshowography of Stephen Miller: What He Does in the Shadows" – Storm Choi (Comedy Central); Last Week Tonight with John Oliver: "Facebook Content Moderation" – Anthony Miale (HBO); Last Week Tonight with John Oliver: "That Stuff's American" – Ryan Barger (HBO)
**Outstanding Picture Editing for a Nonfiction Program**: **Pee-wee as Himself – Damian Rodriguez (HBO)**‡; Chimp Crazy: "Gone Ape" – Evan Wise, Charles Divak, Adrienne Gits, Doug Abel, and Sascha Stanton-Craven (HBO); Ladies & Gentlemen... 50 Years of SNL Music – James Lester, Oz Rodríguez, and F. Michael Young (NBC); SNL50: Beyond Saturday Night: "More Cowbell" – Cori Wapnowska (Peacock); Super/Man: The Christopher Reeve Story – Otto Burnham (HBO); Will & Harper – Monique Zavistovski and Lori Lovoy-Goran (Netflix)	**Outstanding Picture Editing for a Structured Reality or Competition Program**: **The Traitors: "Let Battle Commence" – Patrick Owen and James Seddon-Brown (Peacock)**‡; The Amazing Race – Kellen Cruden, Eric Beetner, Kevin Blum, Christina Fontana, Jay Gammill, Eric Goldfarb, Katherine Griffin, Jason Groothuis, Darrick Lazo, Ryan Leamy, Josh Lowry, Steve Mellon, Michelle Ivan Messina, Paul Nielsen, and Steven Urrutia (CBS); Queer Eye: "She Was a Showgirl" – Jennifer Roth, Mickala Andres, and Carlos J. Gamarra (Netflix); RuPaul's Drag Race: "Squirrel Games" – Jamie Martin, Paul Cross, Ryan Mallick, and Michael Roha (MTV); The Voice – Sean Basaman, John M. Larson, Robert M. Malachowski JR., Matt Antell, John Baldino, Matthew Blair, Melissa Silva Borden, William Fabian Castro, Norwood Cheek, Andrew Ciancia, Nicholas Don Vito, Glen Ebesu, Rick Enrique, Greg Fitzsimmons, Brian Freundlich, Noel A. Guerra, John Homesley, Omega Hsu, Niki Hunter, Ryan P. James, Lise Kearney, Alyssa Dressman Lehner, Terri Maloney, James J. Munoz, Jonathan Provost, Rich Remis, Robby Thompson, Matt Wafaie, and Eric Wise (NBC)
**Outstanding Picture Editing for an Unstructured Reality Program**: **Welcome to Wrexham: "Down to the Wire" – Sam Fricke, Jenny Krochmal, Mohamed el Manasterly, Michael Oliver, Tim Roche, Matt Wafaie, Steve Welch, and Tim Wilsbach (FX)**‡; Deadliest Catch – Rob Butler, Isaiah Camp, Josh Stockero, Alexander Rubinow, Hugh Elliott, Nico Natale, Brock Carter, Christopher James Forrest, and Chris Courtner (Discovery); Life Below Zero: "The Last Snow" – Matt Edwards, Matt Mercer, Jennifer Nelson, Michael Swingler, and Tanner Roth (Nat Geo); Love on the Spectrum: "Episode 7" – Leanne Cole, Rachel Grierson-Johns, Gretchen Peterson, and John Rosser (Netflix); RuPaul's Drag Race: Untucked: "Drag Baby Mamas" – Miguel Siqueiros, Jimmy Bazan, and Johanna Gavard (MTV)

=== Sound Editing ===
**Outstanding Sound Editing for a Comedy or Drama Series (One Hour)**: **The Last of Us: "Through the Valley" – Michael J. Benavente, Chris Terhune, Joe Schiff, Christopher Battaglia, Mitchell Lestner, Jacob Flack, Odin Benitez, James Miller, Randy Wilson, Justin Helle, Ron Mellegers, Maarten Hofmeijer, Stefan Fraticelli, Brandon Bak, and Jason Charbonneau (HBO)**‡; Andor: "Who Are You?" – David Acord, Margit Pfeiffer, James Spencer, Josh Gold, Alyssa Nevarez, John Finklea, Ronni Brown, and Sean England (Disney+); The Pitt: "7:00 P.M." – Bryan Parker, Kristen Hirlinger, Vince Tennant, Josh Adeniji, Roland Thai, Sam Lewis, Lyndsey Schenk, Nicholas Kmet, Adam DeCoster, and Alex Ullrich (HBO Max); Severance: "Chikhai Bardo" – Jacob Ribicoff, Gregg Swiatlowski, Eric Strausser, Sam Zeines, Felipe Pacheco, Marko Costanzo, and Alex Wang (Apple TV+)	**Outstanding Sound Editing for a Comedy or Drama Series (Half-Hour)**: **The Studio: "The Golden Globes" – George Haddad, Borja Sau, Lloyd Stuart Martin, Randy Wilson, Justin Helle, Lorena Perez Batista, Jason Charbonneau, and Stefan Fraticelli (Apple TV+)**‡; The Acolyte: "Night" – Brian Chumney, Kimberly Patrick, Angela Ang, David Chrastka, Dee Selby, Alistair Hawkins, Goro Koyama (Disney+); Agatha All Along: "Darkest Hour / Wake Thy Power" – Kim Foscato, Paula Fairfield, Richard Gould, Daniel Laurie, Jacob Riehle, Andre J.H. Zweers, Kim B. Christensen, Fernand Bos, Mary Parker, Jana Vance, and Ronni Brown (Disney+); The Bear: "Doors" – Steve "Major" Giammaria, Craig LoGiudice, Evan Benjamin, John Bowen, Jonathan Fuhrer, Matt Snedecor, Annie Taylor, Jason Lingle, Jeff Lingle, Leslie Bloome, and Shaun Brennan (FX); The Righteous Gemstones: "Prelude" – Nicholas Renbeck, Alexa Zimmerman, Deborah Wallach, Rachel Wardell, Ailin Gong, Michael Brake, and Tommy Stang (HBO)
**Outstanding Sound Editing for an Animated Program**: **Arcane: "The Dirt Under Your Nails" – Brad Beaumont, Eliot Connors, Stephen P. Robinson, Janet "PJ" Pascual, Dan O'Connell, and John Cucci (Netflix)**‡; Love, Death & Robots: "400 Boys" – Brad North, Craig Henighan, Dawn Lunsford, Jeff Charbonneau, and Alicia Stevens (Netflix); Secret Level: "Warhammer 40,000: They Shall Know No Fear" – Matt Yocum, Brad North, Nolan McNaughton, Ryan Sullivan, Joseph Fraioli, Christopher Battaglia, Harry Cohen, Matt Manselle, Matt Tesley, and Brian Straub (Prime Video); Star Trek: Lower Decks: "The New Next Generation" – James Lucero, Drew Guy, Konrad Piñon, James Singleton, John Wynn, Michael Britt, and Amber Funk (Paramount+); What If...?: "What If... 1872?" – Mac Smith, Vanessa Lapato, Alyssa Nevarez, Steve Bissinger, Derek McGinley, Anele Onyekwere, Carl Sealove, Andrea Stelter Gard, and Sean England (Disney+)	**Outstanding Sound Editing for a Limited or Anthology Series, Movie or Special**: **The Penguin: "After Hours" – Rich Bologna, Larry Zipf, Michael McMenomy, Angela Organ, Tony Martinez, Wyatt Sprague, Diego Perez, Matt Haasch, Ben Holiday, Luke Dennis, and Gareth Rhys Jones (HBO)**‡; Adolescence: "Episode 1" – James Drake, Michele Woods, Emma Butt, Rob Davidson, Jessica Watkins, Oli Ferris, and Sue Harding (Netflix); Black Mirror: "USS Callister: Into Infinity" – Tom Jenkins, Alex Sawyer, James Hayday, Rob Davidson, Arthur Graley, Poppy Kavanagh, Oliver Ferris, and Sue Harding (Netflix); The Gorge – Ethan Van der Ryn, Erik Aadahl, Paul Hackner, Darren Maynard, David Farmer, Frederic Dubois, David V. Butler, Stephanie Brown, Jonathan Greasley, Jason W. Jennings, Nolan McNaughton, and Sally Boldt (Apple TV+); Star Trek: Section 31 – Matthew E. Taylor, Michael Schapiro, Austin Olivia Kendrick, Sebastian Sheehan Visconti, Sean Heissinger, Andrew Twite, Alex Pugh, Kip Smedley, Deron Street, Clay Weber, Moira Marquis, Alyson Moore, and Katie Rose (Paramount+)
**Outstanding Sound Editing for a Nonfiction or Reality Program**: **Music by John Williams – Dmitri Makarov, Tim Farrell, Richard Gould, and Ramiro Belgardt (Disney+)**‡; Beatles '64 – Philip Stockton, Allan Zaleski, and John M. Davis (Disney+); 100 Foot Wave: "Chapter III: Cortes Bank" – Eric Di Stefano, Kevin Senzaki, Max Holland, Eli Akselrod, and Mika Anami (HBO); Pee-wee as Himself – Daniel Timmons, Ian Cymore, Ryan Billia, Jeremy S. Bloom, Kelly Rodriguez, Eric Caudieux, and Jonathan Zalben (HBO); SNL50: Beyond Saturday Night: "Season 11: The Weird Year" – William Harp and Sean Gray (Peacock)

=== Sound Mixing ===
**Outstanding Sound Mixing for a Comedy or Drama Series (One Hour)**: **Severance: "Cold Harbor" – Bob Chefalas, Jacob Ribicoff, David Schwartz, and George Lara (Apple TV+)**‡; Andor: "Who Are You?" – David Acord, Danny Hambrook, Geoff Foster, and Richard Duarte (Disney+); The Last of Us: "Through the Valley" – Marc Fishman, Samuel Ejnes, Chris Duesterdiek, Jeffrey Roy, and Tami Treadwell (HBO); The Pitt: "6:00 P.M." – Todd M. Grace, Ed C. Carr III, Von Varga, and Tami Treadwell (HBO); The White Lotus: "Amor Fati" – Christian Minkler, Ryan Collins, Bea O'Sullivan, Jamison Rabbe, and Michael Head (HBO)	**Outstanding Sound Mixing for a Limited or Anthology Series or Movie**: **The Penguin: "After Hours" – Rich Bologna, Andy Kris, Chris Gebert, and Julien Pirrie (HBO)**‡; Adolescence: "Episode 1" – Jules Woods, Kiff McManus, Rob Entwistle, and Adam Méndez (Netflix); Black Mirror: "USS Callister: Into Infinity" – James Ridgway, Stuart Piggott, Adam Méndez, and Sam Okell (Netflix); Monsters: The Lyle and Erik Menendez Story: "Blame It on the Rain" – Jamie Hardt, Laura Wiest, John Bauman, and Mehrnaz Mohabati (Netflix); Zero Day: "Episode 6" – Pete Elia, Jason Coleman, Ken Ishii, and Michael Perfitt (Netflix)
**Outstanding Sound Mixing for a Comedy or Drama Series (Half-Hour) and Animation**: **The Studio: "The Golden Globes" – Lindsey Alvarez, Fred Howard, Buck Robinson, and Ron Mellegers (Apple TV+)**‡; The Bear: "Doors" – Steve "Major" Giammaria, Scott D. Smith, Patrick Christensen, and Ryan Collison (FX); Mid-Century Modern: "Sour Pickleball" – Peter Nusbaum, Whitney Purple, and Jeff A. Johnson (Hulu); Only Murders in the Building: "Once Upon a Time in the West" – Mathew Waters, Kyle O'Neal, Joseph White Jr., and Alan DeMoss (Hulu); Shrinking: "The Drugs Don't Work" – Earl Martin, Anna D. Wilborn, Alex Jongbloed, and Trino Madriz (Apple TV+)	**Outstanding Sound Mixing for a Variety Series or Special**: **SNL50: The Anniversary Special – Robert Palladino, Ezra Matychak, Frank Duca, Doug Nightwine, Christopher Costello, Caroline Sanchez, Josiah Gluck, Jay Vicari, Tyler McDiarmid, Geoff Countryman, Devin Emke, and Teng Chen (NBC)**‡; The Daily Show: "Jon Stewart and the News Team Live at the Chicago DNC" – John Neroulas and Patrick Weaver (Comedy Central); The 67th Annual Grammy Awards – Thomas Holmes, John Harris, Eric Schilling, Jamie Pollock, Jeffrey Michael Peterson, Michael Parker, Andres Arango, Juan Pablo Velasco, Aaron Walk, Christian Schrader, Eric Johnston, and Doug Wingert (CBS); The Oscars – Paul Sandweiss, Tommy Vicari, Steve Genewick, Tom Pesa, Biff Dawes, Pablo Munguia, Kristian Pedregon, Patrick Baltzell, Michael Parker, Christian Schrader, and John Perez (ABC); SNL50: The Homecoming Concert – Thomas Holmes, Christian Schrader, Eric Schilling, Lawrence Manchester, Dan Gerhard, Jason Crystal, Jamie Pollock, Juan Pablo Velasco, Anthony Lalumia, Mike Bové, Cesar Benitez, Talia Krause, and Al Theurer (Peacock)
**Outstanding Sound Mixing for a Nonfiction Program**: **Beatles '64 – Josh Berger and Giles Martin (Disney+)**‡; Music by John Williams – Roy Waldspurger, Christopher Barnett and Noah Alexander (Disney+); 100 Foot Wave: "Chapter III: Cortes Bank" – Keith Hodne (HBO); Pee-wee as Himself – Johnny Mathie (HBO); Yacht Rock: A Dockumentary (Music Box) – Tony Solis, Paul Stula and Barry London (HBO)	**Outstanding Sound Mixing for a Reality Program**: **Welcome to Wrexham: "Down to the Wire" – Mark Jensen (FX)**‡; The Amazing Race – Jim Ursulak, Allie Boettger, Paul Bruno, John Buchanan, Dean Gaveau, Ryan P. Kelly, Marcus Lominy, Richard Chardy Lopez, Mickey McMullen, Sean Milburn, Paul Orozco, Simon Paine, John Pitron, Jeff Zipp, Troy Smith, and Ryan Gerle (CBS); American Idol: "Grand Finale" – Patrick Smith, Randy Faustino, Michael Parker, Manny Barrajas, Christian Schrader, Jesse Dunham, Barry Weir Jr., and Adrian Ordonez (ABC); Deadliest Catch: "My Brother's Keeper" – Jared Robbins (Discovery Channel); The Voice: "Live Finale, Part 2" – Michael Abbott, Randy Faustino, Tim Hatayama, Christian Schrader, Carlos Torres, Andrew Fletcher, Shaun Sebastian, Kenyata Westbrook, Colin Bonney, Servio Escobedo, John Koster, Robert P. Matthews Jr., Marlon Moore, and Ryan Young (NBC)

=== Special Visual Effects ===
**Outstanding Special Visual Effects in a Season or a Movie**: **Andor – Mohen Leo, TJ Falls, Luke Murphy, Neal Scanlan, Scott Pritchard, Joseph Kasparian, Sue Rowe, Paolo D'Arco, and Jean-Clément Soret (Disney+)**‡; Dune: Prophecy – Terron Pratt, Michael Enriquez, Brennan Prevatt, Martyn Culpitt, Philip Engstrom, Peter Lames, Julien Hery, Vincent Poitras, and Jed Glassford (HBO); House of the Dragon – Daði Einarsson, Lev Kolobov, Thomas Horton, Mike Dawson, Sven Martin, Fausto Tejeda, Wayne Taz Stables, Marcus Goodwin, and Martin Pelletier (HBO); The Last of Us – Alex Wang, Fiona Campbell Westgate, Jed Glassford, Joel Whist, Stephen James, Nick Epstein, Dennis Yoo, Philip Engström, and Andreas Giesen (HBO); The Lord of the Rings: The Rings of Power – Jason Smith, Tim Keene, Ann Podlozny, James Yeoman, Daniele Bigi, Greg Butler, Ara Khanikian, Laurens Ehrmann, and Ryan Conder (Prime Video)	**Outstanding Special Visual Effects in a Single Episode**: **The Penguin: "Bliss" – Johnny Han, Michelle Rose, Alexandre Prod'homme, Erin Sullivan, Goran Pavles, Emanuel Fuchs, Ed Bruce, Nathaniel Larouche, and Adrien Saint Girons (HBO)**‡; Black Mirror: "USS Callister: Into Infinity" – James MacLachlan, Josie Henwood, Kubra Tanyel, David Schneider, Tallulah Baker, Jane Paton, Jonathan Caruana, Filip Latal, and Jamie Wood (Netflix); The Residence: "The Fall of the House of Usher" – Seth Hill, Tesa Kubicek, John Nelson, Ryan Urban, Phillip Moses, Brandon Nelson, Spencer Hecox, Gabriel Vargas, and Burke Roane (Netflix); Severance: "Hello, Ms. Cobel" – Eric Leven, Sean Findley, Shawn Hillier, Radost Ridlen, Martin Kolejak, Brian Holligan, Alex Lemke, Michael Huber, and Djuna Wahlrab (Apple TV+); The Umbrella Academy: "End of the Beginning" – Everett Burrell, Sabrina Arnold, Sophie Vertigan, Laurent Spillemaecker, Gabriel Beauvais, Maria Saade, Pier-Olivier Allard, Ryan Freer, and Jeff Campbell (Netflix)

=== Stunts ===
**Outstanding Stunt Coordination for Comedy Programming**: **The Righteous Gemstones – Cory DeMeyers (HBO)**‡; Cobra Kai – Ken Barefield (Netflix); Only Murders in the Building – Chris Barnes (Hulu); Poker Face – Tom Place (Peacock); Tulsa King – Freddie Poole (Paramount+)	**Outstanding Stunt Coordination for Drama Programming**: **The Boys – John Koyama (Prime Video)**‡; FBI: Most Wanted – Declan Mulvey and Nitasha Bhambree (CBS); Lioness – Wade Allen (Paramount+); The Penguin – Stephen Pope (HBO); The Rookie – David Scott Rowden Sr. (ABC)
**Outstanding Stunt Performance**: **The Boys: "The Insider" – Jennifer Murray, River Godland, Alec Back and Moses Nyarko (Prime Video)**‡; FBI: Most Wanted: "Moving On" – Evelyn O. Vaccaro and Alex Huynh (CBS); The Penguin: "Top Hat" – Corey Pierno and Chris Gombos (HBO); The Rookie: "Til Death" – Sonja Wajih and Paul Lacovara (ABC); Severance: "Cold Harbor" – Justice Hedenberg, Katie Rowe and Erik Martin (Apple TV+)

=== Technical Direction ===
**Outstanding Technical Direction and Camerawork for a Series**: **Saturday Night Live: "Host: Jack Black" – Bill DiGiovanni, John Pinto, Paul Cangialosi, Anthony Tarantino, Dave Driscoll, Brian Phraner, and Daniel Erbeck (NBC)**‡; After Midnight: "Featuring Jonah Ray, Kumail Nanjiani, Emily Gordon" – Christine Salomon, Lauren Gadd, Dawn Henry, Chris Hamilton, Cory Hunter, Cary Symmons, and Jani Zandovskis (CBS); The Daily Show: "Jon Stewart & The News Team Live at the Chicago DNC" – Michael Williams, John Floresca, Charlie Foerschner, Jeff Latonero, James McEvoy, Matt Muro, Tim Quigley, Phil Salanto, Michael Schmehl, and Rich York (Comedy Central); Everybody's Live with John Mulaney: "How Tall Are You?" – Chris Salomon, Bert Atkinson, Ed Horton, Karin Pelloni, Cole Overholser, George Prince, John Perry, Keyan Safyari, Damien Tuffereau, Suzie Weis, and Terrance Ho (Netflix); The Voice: "Live Finale (Part 1)" – Allan Wells, Manny Bonilla, Mano Bonilla, Martin J. Brown Jr., Robert Burnette, Suzanne Ebner, Guido Frenzel, Alex Hernandez, Scott Hylton, Scott Kaye, Jofre Rosero, Steve Thiel, and Danny Webb (NBC)	**Outstanding Technical Direction and Camerawork for a Special**: **SNL50: The Anniversary Special – Bill DiGiovanni, John Pinto, Paul Cangialosi, Anthony Tarantino, Dave Driscoll, Brian Phraner, Daniel Erbeck, Michael Knarre, Anthony Lenzo, Ansel Nunez, and Rick Fox (NBC)**‡; Bono: Stories of Surrender – Erik Messerschmidt, Mark Goellnicht, Brian S. Osmond, Vince Vennitti, Charles Libin, Christine Kapo Ng, Richard Rutkowski, and Luke McCoubrey (Apple TV+); An Evening with Dua Lipa – Nick Kauffman, Lincoln Abraham, Gareth Beeson, John Clarke, Alex Dodd, Curtis Dunne, Dave Emery, Dave Evans, Ben Frewin, Lisha Gilbert, Matt Gladstone, Dom Jackson, Rob Mansfield, Ali Miller, James Neal, Sophie Penwill, Mark Sayers, Alan Wells, and Shaun Willis (CBS); An Evening with Elton John & Brandi Carlile – Dan Winterburn, Bill Ashworth, Curtis Dunne, Alex Dodd, Ben Frewin, Sam Keogh, Marcus Leon Soon, Lewis Mutongwizo, Mark Sayers, Andre Seraille, Carl Veckranges, Shaun Willis, and Alan Wells (CBS); The Lion King at the Hollywood Bowl – Brandon Smith, Tim Farmer, Jofre Rosero, David Rudd, George Prince, Karin Pelloni, Rob Palmer, Bobby Delrusso, Rob Vuona, Austin Rock, John Perry, Adam Margolis, Danny Bonilla, and Danny Webb (Disney+); 2024 Rock & Roll Hall of Fame Induction Ceremony – Eric Becker, Danny Bonilla, Kary D'Alessandro, Dave Driscoll, Curtis Eastwood, David Eastwood, Nathanial Havholm, Jeff Johnson, Zachariah Jones, Jay Kulick, Dave Levisohn, Adam Margolis, Rob Palmer, Tim Quigley, Jofre Rosero, David Rudd, Chad Smith, Matt Trujillo, Easter Xua, Tom Zaleski, and Jeremy Freeman (ABC)

=== Writing ===
**Outstanding Writing for a Variety Special**: **SNL50: The Anniversary Special – James Anderson, Dan Bulla, Megan Callahan-Shah, Michael Che, Mikey Day, Mike DiCenzo, James Downey, Tina Fey, Jimmy Fowlie, Alison Gates, Sudi Green, Jack Handey, Steve Higgins, Colin Jost, Erik Kenward, Dennis McNicholas, Seth Meyers, Lorne Michaels, John Mulaney, Jake Nordwind, Ceara O'Sullivan, Josh Patten, Paula Pell, Simon Rich, Pete Schultz, Streeter Seidell, Emily Spivey, Kent Sublette, Bryan Tucker and Auguste White (NBC)**‡; Conan O'Brien: The Kennedy Center Mark Twain Prize for American Humor – Jon Macks, Chris Convy, Lauren Greenberg, Skyler Higley, Ian Karmel and Sean O'Connor (Netflix); Cunk on Life – Charlie Brooker, Ben Caudell, Erika Ehler, Charlie George, Eli Goldstone, Jason Hazeley, Lucia Keskin, Diane Morgan, Joel Morris and Michael Odewale (Netflix); Sarah Silverman: PostMortem – Sarah Silverman (Netflix); Your Friend, Nate Bargatze – Nate Bargatze (Netflix)	**Outstanding Writing for a Nonfiction Program**: **The Daily Show Presents: Jordan Klepper Fingers the Pulse: MAGA: The Next Generation – Ian Berger, Jordan Klepper, Jen Flanz, Devin Delliquanti, and Scott Sherman (Comedy Central)**‡; Chimp Crazy: "Head Shot" – Eric Goode, Jeremy McBride, Timothy Moran, Evan Wise, and Adrienne Gits (HBO); Conan O'Brien Must Go: "Austria" – Conan O'Brien, Mike Sweeney, Jessie Gaskell, and José Arroyo (HBO); Martha – R.J. Cutler (Netflix); Super/Man: The Christopher Reeve Story – Peter Ettedgui, Ian Bonhôte, and Otto Burnham (HBO)

=== Governors Award ===
During the second night of the Creative Arts Emmys, the Governors Award was presented to the Corporation for Public Broadcasting, in recognition of CPB's championing "storytelling that informs, educates, and unites us and ensures public media remains a vital space where diverse voices are heard and communities are served". The award was accepted by CPB president and CEO Patricia Harrison on the organization's behalf. From its founding in 1967, CPB supported public broadcasters, including PBS and NPR, but following the removal of federal funding with the Rescissions Act of 2025, CPB shut down in January 2026.

=== Nominations and wins by program ===
For the purposes of the lists below, any wins in juried categories are assumed to have a prior nomination.

Programs with multiple Creative Arts nominations
Nominations	Program	Network
17	Severance	Apple TV+
17	The Penguin	HBO
16	The Studio	Apple TV+
13	The Last of Us	HBO
13	The White Lotus	HBO
11	Andor	Disney+
11	SNL50: The Anniversary Special	NBC
9	Hacks	HBO Max
7	RuPaul's Drag Race	MTV
7	The Bear	FX
7	Black Mirror	Netflix
7	Monsters: The Lyle and Erik Menendez Story	Netflix
6	The Daily Show	Comedy Central
6	The Pitt	HBO Max
6	The Righteous Gemstones	HBO
6	House of the Dragon	HBO
5	Love on the Spectrum	Netflix
5	Pee-wee as Himself	HBO
5	Will & Harper	Netflix
5	Bridgerton	Netflix
5	Only Murders in the Building	Hulu
5	The Oscars	ABC
5	Adolescence	Netflix
5	The Amazing Race	CBS
5	SNL50: The Homecoming Concert	Peacock
5	The Voice	NBC
4	Saturday Night Live	NBC
4	Last Week Tonight with John Oliver	HBO
4	100 Foot Wave	HBO
4	The Boys	Prime Video
4	The Traitors	Peacock
4	Dune: Prophecy	HBO
4	What We Do in the Shadows	FX
4	67th Annual Grammy Awards	CBS
4	Super/Man: The Christopher Reeve Story	HBO
3	The Apple Music Super Bowl LIX Halftime Show Starring Kendrick Lamar	Fox
3	Beyoncé Bowl	Netflix
3	Queer Eye	Netflix
3	Welcome to Wrexham	FX
3	Chef's Table	Netflix
3	SNL50: Beyond Saturday Night	Peacock
3	Die Hart: Hart to Kill	The Roku Channel
3	Survivor	CBS
3	The Residence	Netflix
3	Mid-Century Modern	Hulu
3	Dying for Sex	FX
3	The Lion King at the Hollywood Bowl	Disney+
3	Emily in Paris	Netflix
3	American Idol	ABC
3	Agatha All Along	Disney+
3	Dancing with the Stars	ABC
3	Conan O'Brien: The Kennedy Center Mark Twain Prize for American Humor	Netflix
3	Your Friend, Nate Bargatze	Netflix
2	The Gorge	Apple TV+
2	Ali Wong: Single Lady	Netflix
2	Bill Burr: Drop Dead Years	Hulu
2	Cunk on Life	Netflix
2	Sarah Silverman: PostMortem	Netflix
2	Celebrity Family Feud	ABC
2	Jeopardy!	ABC / Syndicated
2	Who Wants to Be a Millionaire	ABC
2	Arcane	Netflix
2	Love, Death & Robots	Netflix
2	The Simpsons	Fox
2	Shark Tank	ABC
2	RuPaul's Drag Race: Untucked	MTV
2	Deaf President Now!	Apple TV+
2	Martha	Netflix
2	Conan O'Brien Must Go	HBO Max
2	The Daily Show Presents: Jordan Klepper Fingers the Pulse: MAGA: The Next Generation	Comedy Central
2	Tucci in Italy	Nat Geo
2	The Daily Show: Desi Lydic Foxsplains	YouTube
2	Poker Face	Peacock
2	What If...?	Disney+
2	Planet Earth: Asia	BBC America
2	The Americas	NBC
2	Top Chef	Bravo
2	1923	Paramount+
2	Pachinko	Apple TV+
2	Jimmy Kimmel Live!	ABC
2	Shrinking	Apple TV+
2	Étoile	Prime Video
2	American Primeval	Netflix
2	Zero Day	Netflix
2	Life Below Zero	Nat Geo
2	Sirens	Netflix
2	Ladies & Gentlemen... 50 Years of SNL Music	NBC
2	Interview with the Vampire	AMC
2	The Boulet Brothers' Dragula	Shudder
2	2024 Rock & Roll Hall Of Fame Induction Ceremony	ABC
2	Cobra Kai	Netflix
2	The Upshaws	Netflix
2	The Rehearsal	HBO
2	Chimp Crazy	HBO
2	Deadliest Catch	Discovery
2	Beatles '64	Disney+
2	Music by John Williams	Disney+
2	FBI: Most Wanted	CBS
2	The Rookie	ABC

Programs with multiple Creative Arts wins
Wins	Program	Network
9	The Studio	Apple TV+
8	The Penguin	HBO
7	SNL50: The Anniversary Special	NBC
6	Severance	Apple TV+
4	Andor	Disney+
4	Arcane	Netflix
4	Love, Death & Robots	Netflix
4	The Traitors	Peacock
3	The Boys	Prime Video
3	Bridgerton	Netflix
3	Pee-Wee as Himself	HBO
3	Saturday Night Live	NBC
2	Adolescence	Netflix
2	The Daily Show: Desi Lydic Foxsplains	YouTube
2	67th Annual Grammy Awards	CBS
2	100 Foot Wave	HBO
2	Love on the Spectrum	Netflix
2	The Pitt	HBO Max
2	Welcome to Wrexham	FX

=== Nominations and wins by network ===
Networks with multiple Creative Arts nominations
Nominations	Network
104	HBO / HBO Max
94	Netflix
46	Apple TV+
30	ABC
25	Disney+
25	NBC
22	CBS
20	FX
17	Peacock
16	Hulu
12	Prime Video
9	MTV
8	Comedy Central
7	Paramount+
6	Fox
5	Nat Geo
4	PBS
4	YouTube
3	The Roku Channel
3	Syndicated
2	Adult Swim
2	AMC
2	BBC America
2	Bravo
2	Discovery
2	Shudder

Networks with multiple Creative Arts wins
Wins	Network
24	Netflix
21	HBO / HBO Max
15	Apple TV+
10	NBC
6	Disney+
5	Prime Video
4	Peacock
3	ABC
3	CBS
2	FX
2	YouTube

== Ceremony order and presenters ==
Presenters on Saturday, September 6
Category	Presenter(s)
Outstanding Guest Actress in a Comedy Series	Maya Rudolph
Outstanding Contemporary Makeup (Non-Prosthetic)	Noah Wyle
Outstanding Prosthetic Makeup	Noah Wyle
Outstanding Period and/or Character Makeup (Non-Prosthetic)	Noah Wyle
Outstanding Period Costumes	Ali Ahn Sarah Shahi
Outstanding Contemporary Costumes for a Series	Ali Ahn Sarah Shahi
Outstanding Contemporary Costumes for a Limited or Anthology Series or Movie	Ali Ahn Sarah Shahi
Outstanding Fantasy/Sci-Fi Costumes	Ali Ahn Sarah Shahi
Outstanding Period or Sci-Fi/Fantasy Hairstyling	Trixie Mattel Kelly Mantle
Outstanding Contemporary Hairstyling	Trixie Mattel Kelly Mantle
Outstanding Production Design for a Narrative Contemporary Program (One Hour or More)	Rhenzy Feliz Theo Rossi
Outstanding Production Design for a Narrative Program (Half-Hour)	Rhenzy Feliz Theo Rossi
Outstanding Production Design for a Narrative Period or Fantasy Program (One Hour or More)	Rhenzy Feliz Theo Rossi
Outstanding Casting for a Drama Series	Gwendoline Christie
Outstanding Guest Actor in a Comedy Series	Gwendoline Christie
Outstanding Casting for a Comedy Series	Nikki Boyer Kelvin Yu
Outstanding Casting for a Limited or Anthology Series or Movie	Nikki Boyer Kelvin Yu
Outstanding Stunt Coordination for a Comedy Programming	Giancarlo Esposito Rhea Seehorn
Outstanding Stunt Coordination for Drama Programming	Giancarlo Esposito Rhea Seehorn
Outstanding Stunt Performance	Giancarlo Esposito Rhea Seehorn
Outstanding Stunt Animated Program	Craig Robinson
Outstanding Character Voice-Over Performance	Craig Robinson
Outstanding Individual Achievement in Animation	Craig Robinson
Outstanding Choreography for Scripted Programming	Justine Lupe Timothy Simons Jackie Tohn
Outstanding Picture Editing for a Single-Camera Comedy Series	Justine Lupe Timothy Simons Jackie Tohn
Outstanding Picture Editing for a Multi-Camera Comedy Series	Justine Lupe Timothy Simons Jackie Tohn
In Memoriam segment	Not applicable
Outstanding Guest Actress in a Drama Series	Jamie Lee Curtis
Outstanding Picture Editing for a Drama Series	Jamie Lee Curtis
Outstanding Picture Editing for a Limited or Anthology Series or Movie	Jamie Lee Curtis
Outstanding Special Visual Effects in a Season or a Movie	Daryl Mitchell
Outstanding Title Design	Daryl Mitchell
Outstanding Special Visual Effects in a Single Episode	Daryl Mitchell
Outstanding Motion Design	Daryl Mitchell
Outstanding Sound Editing for a Comedy or Drama Series (One-Hour)	Malin Akerman Brittany Snow
Outstanding Sound Editing for a Limited or Anthology Series, Movie or Special	Malin Akerman Brittany Snow
Outstanding Sound Editing for a Comedy or Drama Series (Half-Hour)	Malin Akerman Brittany Snow
Outstanding Sound Editing for a Animated Program	Malin Akerman Brittany Snow
Outstanding Sound Mixing for a Limited or Anthology Series or Movie	Mikaela Hoover Tayme Thapthimthong
Outstanding Sound Mixing for a Comedy or Drama Series (One-Hour)	Mikaela Hoover Tayme Thapthimthong
Outstanding Sound Mixing for a Comedy or Drama Series (Half-Hour) and Animation	Mikaela Hoover Tayme Thapthimthong
Outstanding Performer in a Short Form Comedy or Drama Series	Shawn Hatosy Katherine LaNasa
Outstanding Music Composition for a Series (Original Dramatic Score)	Shawn Hatosy Katherine LaNasa
Outstanding Music Composition for a Limited or Anthology Series, Movie or Special (Original Dramatic Score)	Shawn Hatosy Katherine LaNasa
Outstanding Original Main Title Theme Music	Anika Noni Rose
Outstanding Music Supervision	Anika Noni Rose
Outstanding Original Music and Lyrics	Anika Noni Rose
Outstanding Cinematography for a Series (Half-Hour)	Robby Hoffman
Outstanding Cinematography for a Series (One Hour)	Robby Hoffman
Outstanding Cinematography for a Limited or Anthology Series or Movie	Robby Hoffman
Outstanding Guest Actor in a Drama Series	Ron Howard
Outstanding Television Movie	Ron Howard

Presenters on Sunday, September 7
Category	Presenter(s)
Outstanding Short Form Comedy or Drama Series	Sarah Silverman
Outstanding Short Form Nonfiction or Reality Series	Sarah Silverman
Outstanding Production Design for a Variety Special	Harvey Guillén
Outstanding Production Design for a Variety or Reality Series	Harvey Guillén
Outstanding Choreography for Variety or Reality Programming	Harvey Guillén
Outstanding Music Direction	Chrissy Metz
Outstanding Music Composition for a Documentary Series or Special (Original Dramatic Score)	Chrissy Metz
Outstanding Sound Editing for a Nonfiction or Reality Program	Chrissy Metz
Outstanding Sound Mixing for a Nonfiction Program	Jet Tila
Outstanding Sound Mixing for a Variety Series or Special	Jet Tila
Outstanding Sound Mixing for a Reality Program	Jet Tila
Outstanding Casting for a Reality Program	Nyle DiMarco Marlee Matlin
Outstanding Emerging Media Program	Nyle DiMarco Marlee Matlin
Outstanding Innovation in Emerging Media Programming	Nyle DiMarco Marlee Matlin
Outstanding Writing for a Nonfiction Program	Frankie Quiñones
Outstanding Writing for a Variety Special	Frankie Quiñones
Outstanding Host for a Game Show	Joe Manganiello
Outstanding Game Show	Joe Manganiello
Outstanding Makeup for a Variety, Nonfiction or Reality Program	Jen Affleck Whitney Leavitt
Outstanding Hairstyling for a Variety, Nonfiction or Reality Program	Jen Affleck Whitney Leavitt
Outstanding Costumes for a Variety, Nonfiction, or Reality Programming	Jen Affleck Whitney Leavitt
Outstanding Picture Editing for Variety Programming (Segment)	Mikey Day
Outstanding Picture Editing for Variety Programming	Mikey Day
Outstanding Picture Editing for a Nonfiction Program	Mikey Day
Outstanding Picture Editing for a Structured Reality or Competition Program	Amaya Espinal Iris Kendall
Outstanding Picture Editing for an Unstructured Reality Program	Amaya Espinal Iris Kendall
Outstanding Cinematography for a Reality Program	Tanner Smith Connor Tomlinson
Outstanding Cinematography for a Nonfiction Program	Tanner Smith Connor Tomlinson
Outstanding Documentary or Nonfiction Series	Jordan Klepper
Outstanding Documentary or Nonfiction Special	Jordan Klepper
Outstanding Narrator	Jordan Klepper
In Memoriam segment	Not applicable
Outstanding Host for a Reality or Reality Competition Program	Ahmir "Questlove" Thompson
Outstanding Hosted Nonfiction Series or Special	Ahmir "Questlove" Thompson
Outstanding Directing for a Reality Program	Danielle Fishel
Outstanding Directing for a Documentary/Nonfiction Program	Danielle Fishel
Outstanding Commercial	David Hoffman Kevin Miles
Outstanding Lighting Design / Lighting Direction for a Series	David Hoffman Kevin Miles
Outstanding Lighting Design / Lighting Direction for a Special	David Hoffman Kevin Miles
Governors Award	Henry Louis Gates Jr.
Outstanding Technical Direction and Camerawork for a Special	Atsuko Okatsuka
Outstanding Technical Direction and Camerawork for a Series	Atsuko Okatsuka
Outstanding Structured Reality Program	Kandi Burruss Riley Burruss
Outstanding Unstructured Reality Program	Kandi Burruss Riley Burruss
Exceptional Merit in Documentary Filmmaking	Kandi Burruss Riley Burruss
Outstanding Directing for a Variety Special	Edwin Lee Gibson
Outstanding Directing for a Variety Series	Edwin Lee Gibson
Outstanding Variety Special (Pre-Recorded)	Thomas Lennon

== Ceremony information ==
The 77th Primetime Creative Arts Emmy Awards were executive produced by Bob Bain and directed by Richard Preuss. Nominations for the awards were unveiled on July 15. The winners were announced during two separate ceremonies at the Peacock Theater in Downtown Los Angeles held over two consecutive nights on September 6 and 7. The first night of awards focused on comedy, drama, and limited series programs, while the second night focused on variety, non-fiction, and reality programming. The two nights were edited into a single broadcast shown on FXX on September 13 and made available later on Hulu.

=== Category and rule changes ===
On January 8, 2025, the Television Academy announced rule changes that affected the directing and guest performer awards. Starting with the 77th ceremony, individuals or directing teams are permitted to submit multiple episodes for consideration in the directing categories, provided that the episodes are from different programs. In previous years, directors or directing teams could only submit one entry per category. Additionally, any performer who had previously won or been nominated in the lead or supporting acting categories would be ineligible to submit a performance of the same character in the same series for consideration in the guest performance categories in subsequent years.

In addition, several categories were moved between the main and Creative Arts broadcasts. Outstanding Writing for a Variety Special was moved to the Creative Arts Award ceremony while Outstanding Writing for a Variety Series and Outstanding Variety Special (Live) were presented on the main broadcast.
