= Come Out and Play =

Come Out and Play may refer to:

- Come Out and Play (film), a 2012 horror film
- Come Out and Play (Twisted Sister album), 1985
- Come Out and Play (Kim Wilde album), 2010
- "Come Out and Play" (The Offspring song), 1994
- "Come Out and Play" (Billie Eilish song), 2018
- Come Out and Play (What We Do in the Shadows), an episode of the TV series What We Do in the Shadows
