= The Promotion (What We Do in the Shadows) =

- What We Do in the Shadows episode
- Episode no.: Season 6 Episode 10
- Directed by: Kyle Newacheck
- Written by: Jake Bender; Zach Dunn; Amelia Haller; William Meny; Lauren Wells
- Cinematography by: Michael Storey
- Editing by: Liza Cardinale; Matthew Freund
- Production code: XWS06010
- Original air date: December 9, 2024
- Running time: 24 minutes

Guest appearances
- Tim Heidecker as Jordan; Andy Assaf as Cravensworth's Monster; Jeremy Levick as Jimmy; Rajat Suresh as Raj; Alyssa Limperis as Lisa

Episode chronology
← Previous "Come Out and Play"	Next → "The Finale"

"The Promotion" is the tenth episode of the sixth season of the American mockumentary comedy horror television series What We Do in the Shadows, set in the franchise of the same name. It is the 60th overall episode of the series and was written by supervising producer Jake Bender, supervising producer Zach Dunn, Amelia Haller, supervising producer William Meny and story editor Lauren Wells, and directed by executive producer Kyle Newacheck. It was released on FX on December 9, 2024.

The series is set in Staten Island, New York City. Like the 2014 film, the series follows the lives of vampires in the city. These consist of three vampires, Nandor, Laszlo, and Nadja. They live alongside Colin Robinson, an energy vampire; and Guillermo, Nandor's familiar. The series explores the absurdity and misfortunes experienced by the vampires. In the episode, Guillermo gets the vampires to accompany him to an office party, believing he will finally get a promotion.

According to Nielsen Media Research, the episode was seen by an estimated 0.151 million household viewers and gained a 0.04 ratings share among adults aged 18–49. The episode received generally positive reviews from critics, who praised Guillermo's storyline, although the Monster's subplot received mixed reactions.

== Plot ==
Guillermo (Harvey Guillén) continues impressing in Cannon Capital, finally feeling that he found a place where people appreciate him. Jordan (Tim Heidecker) tells Guillermo to come by the following day, as he plans to toast to his achievements. He also asks him to brings his friends, worrying Guillermo.

The vampires accompany Guillermo, with Cravensworth's Monster coming along to please Laszlo (Matt Berry). Laszlo forbids the Monster from performing activities and makes him repeat scientific facts, upsetting Colin Robinson (Mark Proksch), who feels Laszlo is abusing him. Nadja (Natasia Demetriou) receives a job offer and happily begins to destroy parts of the building, while criticizing her co-workers. Nandor (Kayvan Novak) meets Jordan, but realizes that Jordan is tricking Guillermo with a promotion in order to use him as a scapegoat in the future. Nandor warns Guillermo, but he believes he is just jealous.

Jordan begins a toast congrulating specific people, without letting Guillermo give a speech. When he confronts him, Jordan reassures him he simply forgot, and prepares to give him something. Guillermo believes he will finally get the promotion, but is disappointed when Jordan simply gives him a picture of themselves. When Guillermo mentions the promotion, Jordan states it will take years for that to happen. Jordan mocks Guillermo, prompting Nandor to appear and choke him, until Guillermo asks him to spare him. Guillermo warns Jordan that he will call SEC and inform them about Jordan's insider trading, using the documentary crew as proof.

As they leave, the Monster recognizes Colin Robinson as his master, with the latter explaining that he is allowing him to display emotions and to be creative. Laszlo accepts the Monster for who he is, believing they have new progress in the scientific field. Nandor confides in Guillermo that he felt good in helping him, and wonders if he could use his powers for good. He suggests he and Guillermo could team up and fight injustice, which amuses Guillermo.

== Production ==
=== Development ===
In November 2024, FX confirmed that the tenth episode of the season would be titled "The Promotion", and that it would be written by supervising producer Jake Bender, supervising producer Zach Dunn, Amelia Haller, supervising producer William Meny and story editor Lauren Wells, and directed by executive producer Kyle Newacheck. This was Bender's eighth writing credit, Dunn's eighth writing credit, Haller's first writing credit, Meny's fifth writing credit, Wells' third writing credit, and Newacheck's 20th directing credit.

== Reception ==
=== Viewers ===
In its original American broadcast, "The Promotion" was seen by an estimated 0.151 million household viewers with a 0.04 in the 18-49 demographics. This means that 0.04 percent of all households with televisions watched the episode. This was a slight increase in viewership from the previous episode, which was watched by 0.149 million household viewers with a 0.03 in the 18-49 demographics.

=== Critical reviews ===
"The Promotion" received generally positive reviews from critics. William Hughes of The A.V. Club gave the episode a "B–" grade and wrote, "There's something kind of intoxicating about how little “The Promotion” does to set us up for a series finale, just as the incredible elasticity of What We Do In The Shadows' reality has always meant it could genuinely go anywhere now that it's time to tear everything down. But that's all a matter for next week's review. For now, we have to sit with this one, a minor piece of table setting with a few nice emotional beats and way too few laughs. Not every penultimate episode is one for the best-of lists, it turns out."

Katie Rife of Vulture gave the episode a 3 star rating out of 5 and wrote, "An ongoing thread in the series that “The Promotion” ties up satisfyingly is the presence of the cameras — sometimes acknowledged, sometimes not — that have been following our vampires around since the very beginning. Like Guillermo, you get used to them and forget that they're there after a while. And like Guillermo, they're always watching."

Myles McNutt of Episodic Medium and wrote "One of the big reasons why “creatures of the night interact with the human world” has been a reliable source of comedy across all six seasons of What We Do in the Shadows is that those scenes so savagely spoof how mundane and predictable we all are. Heck, even Cravensworth's Monster can pass as “normal,” just by mastering the meaningless chit-chat that defines so much of our daily existence." Melody McCune of Telltale TV gave the episode a 3.5 star rating out of 5, and wrote "What We Do in the Shadows Season 6 Episode 10, “The Promotion,” zeroes in on Guillermo's growth and his dynamic with Nandor, with dazzling performances all around. It's not as strong as last week's nearly five-star fare (although that's a tough bar to reach); however, it's a deceptively light and breezy episode."
