= Conan O'Brien: The Kennedy Center Mark Twain Prize for American Humor =

2025 television special

- Genre: Variety special
- Written by: Jon Macks; Chris Convy; Lauren Greenberg; Skyler Higley; Ian Karmel; Sean O'Connor
- Directed by: Marcus Raboy
- Starring: Conan O'Brien; John Mulaney; Will Ferrell; Nikki Glaser; Bill Burr; Sarah Silverman; Stephen Colbert; Adam Sandler; David Letterman
- Announcer: Triumph the Insult Comic Dog (voiced by Robert Smigel)
- Country of origin: United States
- Original language: English

Production
- Executive producers: David Jammy; Chris Convy; Kristen Wong; Rick Austin; Matthew Winer; Monica Holt
- Producers: Marcus Raboy; Phil Rosenberg; Robin Burke; Neha Patel; Emeline Carlisle
- Editors: Timothy Schultz; Bill DeRonde
- Running time: 86 minutes
- Production companies: Done and Dusted Productions; John F. Kennedy Center for the Performing Arts

Original release
- Network: Netflix
- Release: May 4, 2025

Conan O'Brien: The Kennedy Center Mark Twain Prize for American Humor is a filmed television special honoring comedian, writer, and talk show host Conan O'Brien who was the 26th recipient of the Mark Twain Prize for American Humor. O'Brien is known for his extensive career as a comedy writer on shows such as the Fox animated sitcom The Simpsons and the NBC sketch comedy series Saturday Night Live as well as hosting several late night programs such as Late Night with Conan O'Brien (1993–2009), The Tonight Show with Conan O'Brien (2009–2010), and Conan (2010–2021).

The ceremony was pre-taped and filmed on March 24, 2025, at the John F. Kennedy Center for the Performing Arts where he was honored by his fellow comedian friends and collaborators such as John Mulaney, Will Ferrell, Nikki Glaser, Bill Burr, Sarah Silverman, Stephen Colbert, Adam Sandler, and David Letterman. The special was then aired on Netflix on May 4, 2025.

== History ==
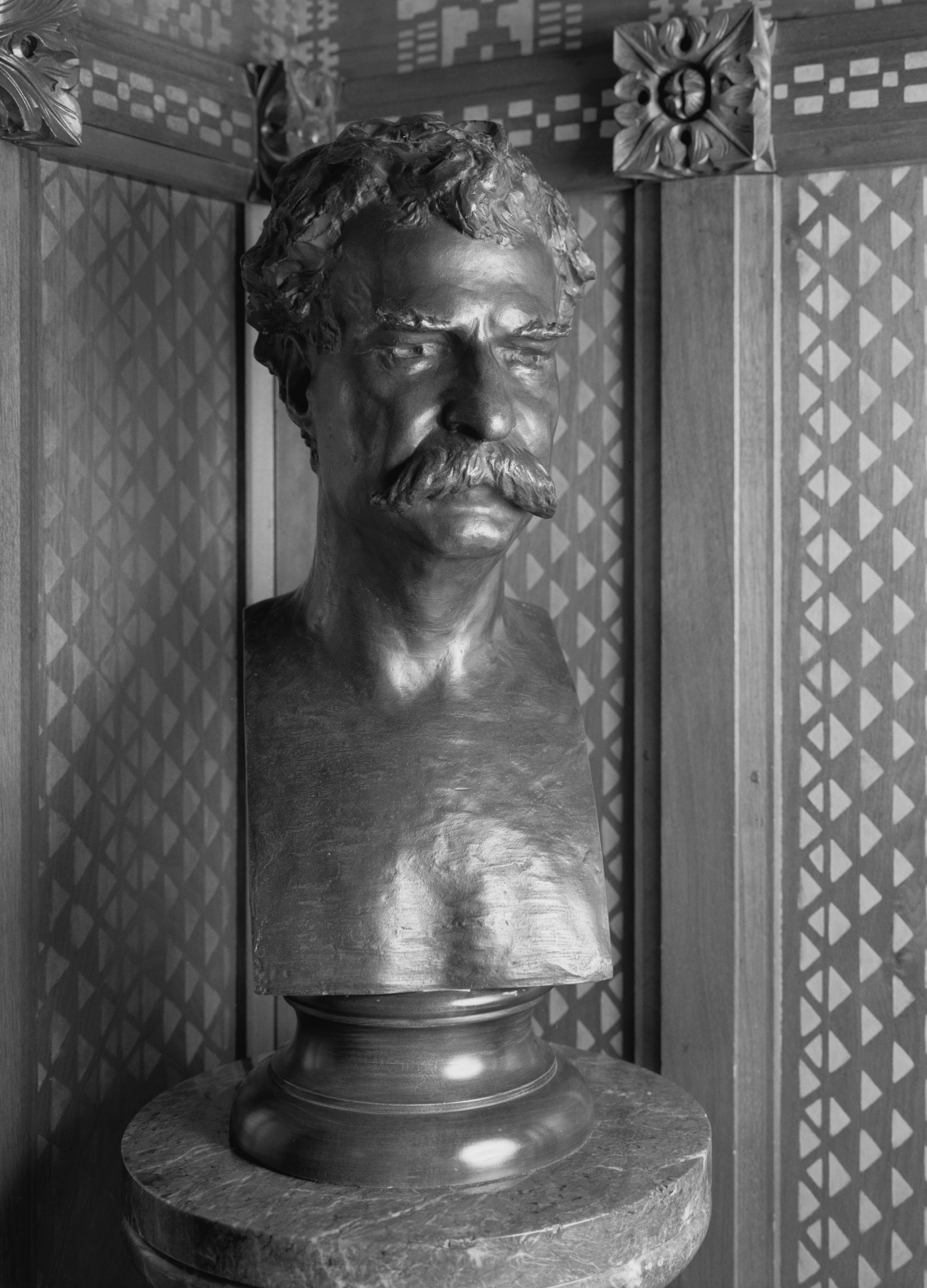
The bust of the Mark Twain Prize for American Humor

The ceremony was dedicated to the 26th recipient of the Mark Twain Prize for American Humor, Conan O'Brien. The first recipient of this award was given to Richard Pryor in 1998 and has since been awarded to numerous comedians including Bob Newhart, Whoopi Goldberg, Billy Crystal, Steve Martin, Tina Fey, Carol Burnett, Bill Murray, Jon Stewart, Julia Louis-Dreyfus, and Dave Chappelle. The prize remains the highest honor a comedian can receive.

The award, named after the 19th-century humorist Mark Twain who famously wrote American classics such as The Adventures of Tom Sawyer (1876), and The Adventures of Huckleberry Finn (1884). The award is presented to individuals who have "had an impact on American society in ways similar to" Twain. The award was presented at the John F. Kennedy Center for the Performing Arts in Washington, D.C., where it has been presented annually since 1998. Organizers initially chose Catherine O'Hara to receive the award. She initially accepted before backing out.

== Production ==
The event was on March 24 where it was pre-taped and filmed at the Kennedy Center. The special debuted on Netflix on May 4, 2025. Numerous friends of O'Brien were at the event to honor him including David Letterman, John Mulaney, Bill Burr, Nikki Glaser, Stephen Colbert, and Adam Sandler. Writer and comedian Robert Smigel as Triumph the Insult Comic Dog served as the announcer for the evening. The Max Weinberg 7 served as the band. Throughout the night he was honored for his work as a writer on The Simpsons, Saturday Night Live, Late Night with Conan O'Brien, The Tonight Show with Conan O'Brien, and Conan, as well as his recent hosting of the 97th Academy Awards.

Several of O'Brien's collaborators from his talk show appeared throughout the ceremony including Andy Richter, The Interrupter, Triumph the Insult Comic Dog, the FedEx Pope, the Masturbating Bear, and Jordan Schlansky. O'Brien ended the show by spotting Mark Twain (portrayed by Will Forte) in the audience. They bickered at each other before embracing and slow dancing. A chorus of Mark Twain impersonators came out and slow danced with each other as well. The show ended with Adam Sandler and O'Brien performing a rendition of the Neil Young song Rockin' in the Free World on their guitars.

== Performers ==
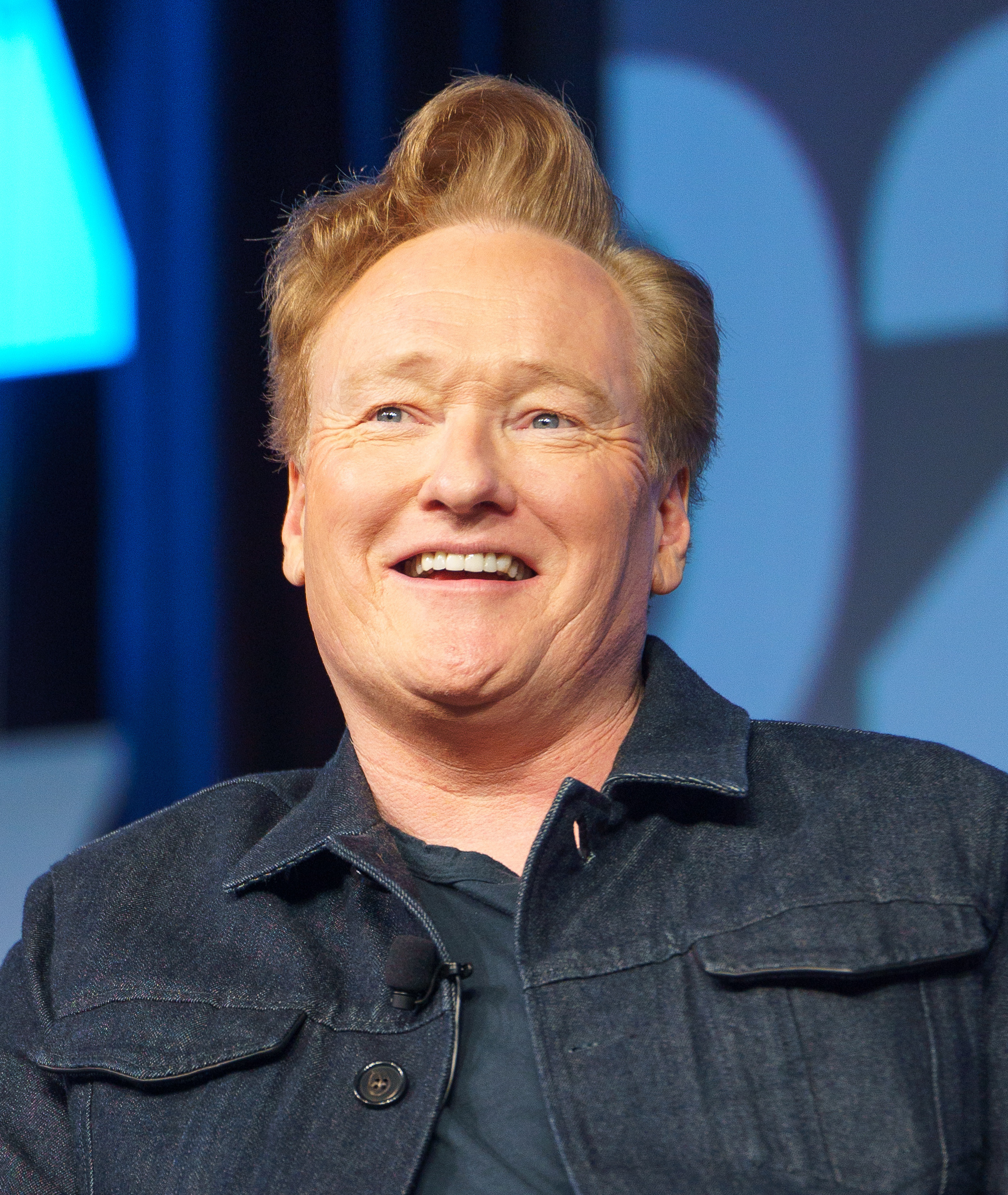
O'Brien in 2024

=== In order of appearance ===
Performer	Notes
John Mulaney	Mulaney made jokes surrounding Conan's influence on him as a child
Will Ferrell	Ferrell jokingly told a story about when he received the award, Conan promised if offered it he would decline it.
Nikki Glaser	Glaser talked about being introduced to O'Brien's comedy by her father and sparred with The Interrupter (played by Brian Stack)
Bill Burr	Burr paid tribute to O'Brien as a friend and fellow comic.
Kumail Nanjiani	Nanjiani in Ted Talk form, argued if Conan O'Brien deserved the honor
Andy Richter	Richter paid tribute to Conan who gave him a career in comedy
Sarah Silverman	Silverman shared memories of playing Adolf Hitler on Conan and comparing Conan’s lips to a woman’s vagina
Stephen Colbert and Sean Evans	Colbert answered questions from Evans as if he were on Hot Ones
Tracy Morgan	Morgan shared his relationship with Conan having both worked for NBC
Reggie Watts	Watts performed a comedic song in tribute to Conan.
Adam Sandler	Sandler paid tribute to O'Brien with a call and response bit from the audience
David Letterman	Letterman shared when he knew Conan would be a great host of Late Night and presented him with the Prize.
Will Forte	Forte portrayed Mark Twain with whom O'Brien fought and eventually slow danced with before being joined with other Mark Twains slow dancing with each other.

=== Pre-taped ===
- Paul Rudd appears as himself (with added clip from Mac and Me)
- Fred Armisen appears as a fictional Harvard University president
- Bill Hader and Martin Short appeared but were cut from the final broadcast.

=== Musical performance ===
- Adam Sandler and Conan O'Brien performed the song Rockin' in the Free World by Neil Young.
- Wade Leist, 2025 World Livestock Auctioneer Champion who quickly read out Conan's list of acknowledgements

== Change at the Kennedy Center ==
Due to the budget cuts and the takeover of the Kennedy Center by newly elected President Donald Trump, many of the performers talked about the regime change of the institution. Conan O'Brien addressed the controversy on his podcast, saying "Obviously for the last couple of months with the new administration, there's been some controversial stuff going on with the Kennedy Center. There was a question of, 'Should I go? Should I not go?' And I felt like it was important to show up."

At the ceremony, many of the performers made jokes and references to the changes and the Trump administration. O'Brien addressed the changes and the political climate in his acceptance speech saying in part, "[Twain] hated bullies … He punched up, not down and he deeply, deeply empathized with the weak", before adding, “He loved America, but he knew it was deeply flawed. Twain wrote 'Patriotism is loving your country all of the time and your government when it deserves it'".

== Reception ==
Elizabeth Blair of NPR described the ceremony as being filled of "silliness, scatological humor, cutting political satire". The ceremony received three nominations and one win at the 2025 Emmys.

== Accolades ==
Year	Award	Category	Recipients	Result
2025	77th Primetime Creative Arts Emmy Awards	Outstanding Variety Special (Pre-Recorded)	David Jammy, Chris Convy, Kristen Wong, Rick Austin, Matthew Winer, Monica Holt, Bill Urban, Michael B. Matuza, Samantha Sullivan, Marcus Raboy, Phil Rosenberg, Robin Burke, Neha Patel, Emeline Carlisle, Andrew Schaff	Won
2025	77th Primetime Creative Arts Emmy Awards	Outstanding Writing for a Variety Special	Jon Macks, Chris Convy, Lauren Greenberg, Skyler Higley, Ian Karmel, Sean O'Connor	Nominated
2025	77th Primetime Creative Arts Emmy Awards	Outstanding Picture Editing for Variety Programming	Timothy Schultz, Bill DeRonde	Nominated
2026	78th Writers Guild of America Awards	Comedy/Variety Special	Jon Macks, Chris Convy, Lauren Greenberg, Skyler Higley, Ian Karmel, Sean O'Connor	Nominated
