= Skyler Higley =

American comedy writer and comedian

Skyler Higley is an American comedy writer and standup comedian.

== Life and career ==
Skyler Higley grew up in Salt Lake City, Utah, a Black child adopted to white, Mormon parents. He has referred to comedy as both a calling and a coping mechanism. He saved money to move to Chicago in 2016 to pursue comedy.

He has been a staff writer at The Onion and on Conan on TBS, as well as the late night show @Midnight. Skyler Higley performs standup comedy regularly and in 2022 released a comedy album titled SALTWATER. He has also appeared on Comedy Central Standup. Higley was part of the team to win a Writers Guild award for the final season of Conan.

Skyler was on the writing team for the 97th Academy Awards telecast hosted by Conan O'Brien. Higley contributed the viral joke “We’ve reached the halfway point of the show," Conan announced, “so now it’s time for Kendrick Lamar to come out and call Drake a pedophile.” He returned to write on the 98th Academy Awards ceremony. Higley has two Prime Time Emmy Nominations for writing on a variety show or special: In 2025 as part of the team writing for Conan O'Brien: The Kennedy Center's Mark Twain Prize, and in 2026 for the Oscars Telecast.

He was named to the 2024 list of Vulture's Comedians You Should And Will Know List as well as TimeOut's 2025 12 Comics to Watch list. Conan O'Brien has called Skyler Higley "Delightfully Bizarre and Undeniably Hilarious"

In addition to comedy writing and performing standup, Skyler Higley hosts a podcast, Help Me Be Black, exploring aspects of black culture he wasn't exposed to growing up in a white family in Salt Lake City.

As of 2025, Higley was based in Los Angeles, but he prefers New York
