= Governors Award (Primetime Emmy Awards) =

The Governors Award was established in 1978 by the Board of Governors of the Academy of Television Arts & Sciences. The award, one of the highest honors presented by the Board, when warranted, recognize an individual, company, or organization that has made a profound, transformational, and long-lasting contribution to the arts and/or science of television by presenting them with the Governors Award.

== Recipients ==
- 1978 – William S. Paley
- 1979 – Walter Cronkite
- 1980 – Johnny Carson
- 1981 – Elton Rule
- 1982 – Hallmark Cards, Inc.
- 1983 – Sylvester L. "Pat" Weaver
- 1984 – Bob Hope
- 1985 – Alistair Cooke
- 1986 – Red Skelton
- 1987 – Grant Tinker
- 1988 – William Hanna & Joseph Barbera
- 1989 – Lucille Ball
- 1990 – Leonard Goldenson
- 1991 – Masterpiece Theatre
- 1992 – Ted Turner
- 1993 – No award given
- 1994 – No award given
- 1995 – PBS
- 1996 – USA's Erase the Hate Campaign / Turner's Native American Initiative
- 1997 – ABC's March Against Drugs Campaign / Comic Relief USA / Jac Venza
- 1998 – National Geographic Channel / Great Books Literacy Project
- 1999 – MTV's "Fight for Your Rights: Take a Stand Against Violence" / Save Our History
- 2000 – A&E's The Biography Project for Schools / The Teen Files / VH1 Save the Music Foundation
- 2001 – CNN / Showtime
- 2002 – ABC, CBS, Fox, and NBC for America: A Tribute to Heroes
- 2003 – Lifetime Network's "Stop the Violence Against Women" initiative
- 2004 – Viacom Inc. (for its pro bono publico outreaches)
- 2005 – Jerry Lewis
- 2006 – MTVu Campaign for Darfur
- 2007 – Idol Gives Back / The Addiction Project
- 2008 – Planet Earth
- 2009 – Sheila Nevins and her HBO documentary unit
- 2010 – Norman Brokaw / Ad Council
- 2011 – John Walsh
- 2012 – It Gets Better Project (co-founders Dan Savage and Terry Miller)
- 2013 – June Foray
- 2014 – Marion Dougherty
- 2015 – A+E Networks
- 2016 – American Idol
- 2017 – ITVS
- 2018 – Star Trek
- 2019 – No award given
- 2020 – Tyler Perry and The Perry Foundation
- 2021 – Debbie Allen
- 2022 – Geena Davis Institute on Gender in Media
- 2023 – GLAAD
- 2024 – Greg Berlanti
- 2025 – Corporation for Public Broadcasting
- 2026 – No award given
