= Jack Murphy (choreographer) =

Choreographer and movement director

Jack Murphy is a choreographer and movement director whose screen work includes the Netflix period drama series Bridgerton, its spin-off Queen Charlotte: A Bridgerton Story, and Doctor Who. He has received three Primetime Emmy Award nominations for Outstanding Choreography for Scripted Programming.

== Career ==
=== Training and theatre ===
Murphy trained as an actor at the London Academy of Music and Dramatic Art from 1985 to 1988. His early stage work included performances at Theatre Royal Stratford East, the Mercury Theatre, Colchester, and the Royal National Theatre. While appearing in The Mountain Giants at the National Theatre, he was invited to assist the theatre’s head of movement and retrain in movement direction, movement teaching and choreography.

His retraining included study with movement directors Jane Gibson and Trish Arnold and with the historical branch of the Royal Academy of Dance. He also studied social and historical dance.

His movement-direction credits at the National Theatre included Three Sisters, Treasure Island and 3 Winters, while his work at the Almeida Theatre included Mary Stuart. Murphy described movement direction as the physical realization of a director’s intentions, including in dramatic works that contain no dance.

=== Screen work ===
Murphy's screen credits included the films The Young Victoria, Vanity Fair, Angus, Thongs and Perfect Snogging and Brighton Rock.

He worked as choreographer and movement director on Bridgerton and its spin-off, Queen Charlotte: A Bridgerton Story. Murphy joined Bridgerton for its first season and continued as the series choreographer through its fourth season.

For the series, Murphy developed period dances and adapted movement to individual characters and relationships. He choreographed quadrilles, country dances, waltzes and cotillions, approaching each sequence through its dramatic circumstances, rather than treating the choreography separately from the story.

For Doctor Who, Murphy choreographed the Regency ball in "Rogue" and the musical sequence in "The Devil's Chord". For the ball, he combined Regency configurations with modern elements and ballroom and Latin American dance, working with director Ben Chessell on camera placement.

== Recognition ==
- Alec Clunes Memorial Prize
- Primetime Emmy Award nomination for Outstanding Choreography for Scripted Programming (2025) for Bridgerton
- Primetime Emmy Award nomination for Outstanding Choreography for Scripted Programming (2025) for Doctor Who
- Primetime Emmy Award nomination for Outstanding Choreography for Scripted Programming (2026) for Bridgerton
