= The Finale (What We Do in the Shadows) =

- What We Do in the Shadows episode
- Episode no.: Season 6 Episode 11
- Directed by: Yana Gorskaya
- Written by: Sam Johnson; Sarah Naftalis; Paul Simms
- Cinematography by: Bevan Crothers
- Editing by: Yana Gorskaya; Dane McMaster
- Production code: XWS06011
- Original air date: December 16, 2024
- Running time: 32 minutes

Guest appearances
- Anthony Atamanuik as Sean Rinaldi; Doug Jones as Baron Afanas; Mike O'Brien as Jerry the Vampire; Marissa Jaret Winokur as Charmaine Rinaldi; Andy Assaf as Cravensworth's Monster; Chris Sandiford as Derek; Parisa Fakhri as Marwa

Episode chronology
← Previous "The Promotion"	Next → —

"The Finale" is the series finale of the American mockumentary comedy horror television series What We Do in the Shadows, set in the franchise of the same name. It is the eleventh episode of the sixth season and the 61st overall episode of the series. The episode was written by executive producers Sam Johnson, Sarah Naftalis, and Paul Simms, and directed by executive producer Yana Gorskaya. It was released on FX on December 16, 2024.

The series is set in Staten Island, New York City. Like the 2014 film, the series follows the lives of vampires in the city. These consist of three vampires, Nandor, Laszlo, and Nadja. They live alongside Colin Robinson, an energy vampire; and Guillermo, Nandor's familiar. The series explores the absurdity and misfortunes experienced by the vampires. In the final episode, the vampires and Guillermo find that the documentary crew has finished their job at the house.

The finale received critical acclaim, with critics praising the episode's meta humor, performances, closure and spoofs, considering it a fitting ending for the series.

== Plot ==
Guillermo (Harvey Guillén) and Nandor (Kayvan Novak) have decided to join forces to fight crime in New York, but debate how to put their plan into action. As Cravensworth's Monster begins to exhibit sexual emotions, Laszlo (Matt Berry) and Colin Robinson (Mark Proksch) decide to create a bride for him. The Monster detaches his penis from his body and gives it to the Guide (Kristen Schaal) as a gift.

As the vampires discuss these events, the documentary crew informs them that they have finished filming. Guillermo gets upset when he hears the news, and Nadja (Natasia Demetriou) deduces that this is because Guillermo fears not being in the spotlight after facing a difficult life. As the vampires argue, Nadja reveals that this is not the first time a documentary crew has filmed them. The vampires, the Monster, and Guillermo watch the first documentary, which was filmed in 1958. That documentary was never released because that crew felt the material was not good enough because the group's dynamics and habits never changed.

Guillermo refuses to accept this, and declares that the documentary needs "a good ending". The other vampires suggest ideas, but none of these potential endings can be feasibly accomplished. Fed up with her housemates' suggestions, Nadja breaks the fourth wall and hypnotizes the viewer into accepting whatever "perfect ending" they have in mind. (Note: Three alternate "endings" are seen in different versions of the episode.) Shortly afterward, Guillermo delivers a speech about everything he learned during the 16 years he lived with the vampires, but he is overshadowed by the Monster having sex with a taxidermied bear. Laszlo plays "We'll Meet Again" on his piano, and the other vampires sing along. Guillermo begins crying and leaves the room.

Later, Guillermo tells Nandor that he is moving out of the house because he feels like he needs to move on from the vampires. Although Nandor is saddened to hear this news, he accepts Guillermo's decision. Guillermo closes Nandor's coffin, and after covering the windows and turning off the lights, he leaves the room. As the TV crew starts disassembling their equipment, Guillermo returns and awakens Nandor, explaining that he is not really moving out, and he only said he was so that the documentary could have a good ending. When Guillermo maintains that he and Nandor will remain friends, Nandor invites Guillermo to sit in his coffin with him. He reveals a secret lever, which brings them down to the secret lair that Nandor has been working on.

In a mid-credits scene, the vampires and Guillermo watch a rough cut of the documentary. They are annoyed by the formulaic and repetitive conversations they have, and wish it never gets to air.

== Production ==
=== Development ===
In November 2024, FX confirmed that the eleventh and final episode of the season would be titled "The Finale", and that it would be written by executive producers Sam Johnson, Sarah Naftalis, and Paul Simms, and directed by executive producer Yana Gorskaya. This was Johnson's 12th writing credit, Naftalis' 10th writing credit, Simms' 17th writing credit, and Gorskaya's 22nd directing credit.

=== Writing ===
When asked over the ending, Kayvan Novak said, "I was aware that the writers left it quite late to decide what they were going to do with the last episode, and, understandably, they needed that time to make good decisions. It's a bit of pressure. But they also didn't give themselves too long to overthink what it would be. And I think that that shows in the final execution of that last episode. They've done it beautifully." Mark Proksch offered his own interpretation, "A hundred years from now, these idiots will still be in their house going through the exact same motions that they've been going through for 200 or 300 years. And I find that refreshing in some way."

Despite the series establishing that Nandor would try to have a relationship with the Guide, Novak knew that was not going to be the case. "I mean, come on she knows him too well. You know, she's met the guy and she knows exactly what he's up to. He's just taking his chances because he's run out of ideas. So, you know, she's the last potential partner at the house party who just has no interest in him whatsoever. It was never gonna happen."

=== Filming ===
The episode wrapped filming on May 3, 2024.

== Alternate scenes ==
When Nadja hypnotizes the viewer into imagining their own "perfect ending", three different versions are seen. Each ending serves as a spoof, using Newhart, The Usual Suspects, and Rosemary's Baby as bases. The episode was broadcast three times in a row, with each broadcast showing a different "perfect ending". The original broadcast version is the version seen in streaming, while the other two are seen in the extra tabs in Hulu.

== Reception ==
=== Critical reviews ===
"The Finale" received critical acclaim. William Hughes of The A.V. Club gave the episode an "A" grade and wrote, "You want to see story arcs get finished? Go watch “The Promotion” again. You need a big action climax? “Come Out And Play” is still sitting right there on Hulu. You need these characters to take a moment and acknowledge how, deep down, they really do love each other? Fuck you: This has never been that show, and it's sure as fuck not going to start being that show with just 32 minutes left on the clock. “The Finale” is funny, smart, relentless, inventive, and energetic — all those things that have made What We Do In The Shadows such a joy to watch for six years of TV — and if you need it to suddenly be something else, too, what show have we even been watching together?"

Alan Sepinwall of Rolling Stone wrote, "Somehow, some way, this unapologetically silly show about how immortality is wasted on anyone selfish enough to get it, managed to end on a beat that was as warm as it was ridiculous. Regardless of what kind of anonymous comments Colin Robinson intends to make about the finale on Deadline, TV Guide, and Den of Geek, this great, explosively funny show in no way whatsoever biffed the landing. Things end. And it can hurt. But it hurts a lot less when the end is this good."

Katie Rife of Vulture gave the episode a perfect 5 star rating out of 5 and wrote, "What We Do in the Shadows has kept the gothy sweethearts of the world well fed for the past six years and has earned a nice, long period of super-slumber in its coffin down in the sub-sub-basement. At its best — which includes this series finale — it represented the pinnacle of sitcom writing and performance, not to mention some killer costuming and sets." Ben Travers of IndieWire wrote, "amid all the delightful teasing toward emotional adieus, “The Finale” actually finds a fitting end — a real one — with just enough heft and just enough silliness to make everyone happy."

William Earl of Variety wrote, "In a television landscape saturated with complex storylines, life-changing character development and serialized moments, What We Do in the Shadows both existed and ended as a proudly silly and irreverent hang-out comedy. Jackie Daytona would certainly raise a glass in celebration." Cheryl Eddy of Gizmodo wrote, "As much as we wish it would live forever, What We Do in the Shadows is indeed over, going out on an episode succinctly titled “The Finale” that wrapped up one major storyline and left others open-ended — but mostly just let us know that when it comes to vampires, nothing really ever changes."

Noel Murray of Episodic Medium and wrote "In a broad sense, What We Do in the Shadows ends as it always had to. The film crew that's been following the vampires for six years decides they have enough footage, and they end the project. The abruptness of their decision might have a meta element to it, referencing the show's own somewhat surprising cancellation. Either way, the writers and cast have fun with the sudden stop, beginning the episode with two Shadows-ready story ideas before immediately abandoning them both." Melody McCune of Telltale TV gave the episode a 4.5 star rating out of 5, and wrote "'The Finale' is an incredibly funny and silly conclusion to an incredibly funny and silly show that had its finger on the undead pulse of pop culture. BAT!"
