= Come Out and Play (What We Do in the Shadows) =

- What We Do in the Shadows episode
- Episode no.: Season 6 Episode 9
- Directed by: DJ Stipsen
- Written by: Shana Gohd; Paul Simms
- Cinematography by: Bevan Crothers
- Editing by: Liza Cardinale; Matthew Freund; Dane McMaster
- Production code: XWS06009
- Original air date: December 2, 2024
- Running time: 27 minutes

Guest appearances
- Alexander Skarsgård as Vampire; Doug Jones as Baron Afanas; Mike O'Brien as Jerry; Andy Assaf as Cravensworth's Monster; Frankie Quiñones as Miguel

Episode chronology
← Previous "P.I. Undercover: New York"	Next → "The Promotion"

"Come Out and Play" is the ninth episode of the sixth season of the American mockumentary comedy horror television series What We Do in the Shadows, set in the franchise of the same name. It is the 59th overall episode of the series and was written by supervising producer Shana Gohd and executive producer Paul Simms, and directed by DJ Stipsen. It was released on FX on December 2, 2024.

The series is set in Staten Island, New York City. Like the 2014 film, the series follows the lives of vampires in the city. These consist of three vampires, Nandor, Laszlo, and Nadja. They live alongside Colin Robinson, an energy vampire; and Guillermo, Nandor's familiar. The series explores the absurdity and misfortunes experienced by the vampires. In the episode, the vampires accompany the Baron to a gathering for an award, where he is confronted by Jerry for his failure in conquering the New World.

According to Nielsen Media Research, the episode was seen by an estimated 0.149 million household viewers and gained a 0.03 ratings share among adults aged 18–49. The episode received critical acclaim, with critics praising the humor, performances, tone, and homage to The Warriors.

== Plot ==
The vampires prepare to attend a special event, where Baron Afanas (Doug Jones) will receive the Eternal Lifetime Achievement Award. Not invited to attend, Guillermo (Harvey Guillén) is disappointed to see Cravensworth's Monster joining the "family" fun.

At the gathering, the vampires mix among other groups, and Jerry (Mike O'Brien) introduces the Baron to the audience. Jerry uses the introduction to express dissatisfaction with the Baron's failure to conquer the New World, prompting an angry Nadja (Natasia Demetriou) to come to the Baron's defense. When their fight intensifies, the Monster squashes Jerry's skull and beheads him. Horrified, the other groups blame the vampires for Jerry's death, forcing them to flee in their bat form. Meanwhile, Guillermo hangs out with his cousin Miguel (Frankie Quiñones); even though the latter bullied him in childhood, their mothers want them to remain friends. When the vampires call for help, Guillermo reluctantly brings Miguel along.

As the vampires move through town, repeatedly encountering various groups they are trying to avoid, they take refuge in a cemetery. Laszlo (Matt Berry) and Nadja get into an argument when she feels intimidated by the Monster, but Laszlo reassures her that the Monster would never harm her. Nandor (Kayvan Novak) admits his feelings for the Guide (Kristen Schaal), which she does not reciprocate. When a swarm of decaying cemetery vampires emerge, the vampires strike back, killing many, then flee to a coffee shop.

Guillermo arrives at the coffee shop, where Nandor uses his powers to prove to Miguel that they are vampires. The staff is revealed to be vampires as well, but Miguel, who also carries Van Helsing's blood, helps Guillermo in killing the staff vampires. Miguel calls in some of his friends, helping the whole gang escape on motorcycles. Back at the Staten Island home, the Baron confronts them for killing Jerry, which he planned to do himself to reassert his power. The Monster returns, having brought Jerry's head. The Baron holds another meeting to declare his intentions to conquer the New World with all vampires, and killing those who question him.

== Production ==
=== Development ===
In November 2024, FX confirmed that the ninth episode of the season would be titled "Come Out and Play", and that it would be written by supervising producer Shana Gohd and executive producer Paul Simms, and directed by DJ Stipsen. This was Gohd's fifth writing credit, Simms' 16th writing credit, and Stipsen's second directing credit.

=== Writing ===
Regarding Baron Afanas' actions in the episode, Doug Jones explained, "Baron Afanas is so self-absorbed, and when he hears that there's going to be an award for him, it's like, 'Well, of course, there is, because I am all of that.' But what he doesn't remember is that he has gotten comfortable in his lifestyle. The Baron knows [Jerry is] kind of right. It was a wake-up call for him to realize that yes, he has leadership skills, but he has not been using them all this time. He's just been lavishing in his own glory, and that's not enough."

=== Casting ===
The episode features a cameo appearance by Alexander Skarsgård as a vampire in the final scene. The character shares a strong resemblance to Skarsgård's character, Eric Northman, in True Blood, although the character's name is not mentioned in the episode. According to Jones, Skarsgård's appearance was a surprise to the background stars, who were not informed of his role until he showed up on set. Skarsgård jokingly released a statement saying, "I'm afraid I have no recollection of shooting this episode as Dr. Laszlo Cravensworth apparently hypnotized me at the wrap party. But I did wake up with an intense physical attraction to Dr. Cravensworth and found his extraordinary wit, charm and intelligence absolutely disarming. I have since started a YouTube fan page for him. It's called 'Because you're Cravens-worth it' Please like, follow and subscribe."

== Reception ==
=== Viewers ===
In its original American broadcast, "Come Out and Play" was seen by an estimated 0.149 million household viewers with a 0.03 in the 18-49 demographics. This means that 0.03 percent of all households with televisions watched the episode. This was a 17% decrease in viewership from the previous episode, which was watched by 0.178 million household viewers with a 0.03 in the 18-49 demographics.

=== Critical reviews ===
"Come Out and Play" received critical acclaim. William Hughes of The A.V. Club gave the episode an "A" grade and wrote, "I've been thinking, more often than not, of this last season of What We Do In The Shadows as a sort of greatest hits collection: a run-through of all the show's best styles of vampire comedy, whether it's The One Where We Dive Deep On One Silly Vampire Quirk or The One Where The Vampires Have To Pretend To Be Human. Tonight, though, the show offers up its rarest of episode types: The One Where What We Do In The Shadows Takes This Shit At Least Halfway Seriously. And it produces one of the best half hours the show has ever done."

Alan Sepinwall wrote, "the breakdancing vampire gang was my favorite, but the whole episode was an absolute delight, all the way through to the show's latest cameo by another famous pop culture vampire, with Alexander Skarsgård back in his True Blood wardrobe for the concluding joke." Katie Rife of Vulture gave the episode a 4 star rating out of 5 and wrote, "Variations of this scenario have appeared during What We Do in the Shadows's six-season run Incorporating the premise of the cult classic The Warriors didn’t hurt, either. All of which is to say that I was thoroughly entertained by this week's episode, which had a lightness and silliness to it that is characteristic of this series at its best."

Myles McNutt of Episodic Medium and wrote "I am very much in awe of 'Come Out and Play', which takes one very simple, very silly idea and gives it the full WWDITS treatment, combing the show's three main comic modes: visual, verbal, and character-driven. The editing is snappy. The special effects are dazzling. There are slapstick gags galore. There's a lot of casually funny lines, thrown away in background chatter, as is the Shadows way." Melody McCune of Telltale TV gave the episode a 4 star rating out of 5, and wrote "What We Do in the Shadows Season 6 Episode 9, 'Come Out and Play', is the show's best episode of the season thus far, featuring plenty of action, humor, and heart. The ensemble cast also fires on all comedic cylinders. It's a welcome uptick (along with last week's fare) in a somewhat rocky final season."
