= 77th Primetime Emmy Awards =

2025 American television programming awards

- Promotional poster
- Date: September 14, 2025 (Ceremony); September 6–7, 2025 (Creative Arts Awards)
- Location: Peacock Theater; Los Angeles, California
- Presented by: Academy of Television Arts & Sciences
- Hosted by: Nate Bargatze

Highlights
- Most awards: Major: Adolescence (6); All: The Studio (13)
- Most nominations: Major: Severance / The White Lotus (10); All: Severance (27)
- Comedy Series: The Studio
- Drama Series: The Pitt
- Limited or Anthology Series: Adolescence

Television/radio coverage
- Network: CBS; Paramount+
- Runtime: 3 hours, 4 minutes
- Viewership: 7.59 million
- Produced by: Jesse Collins Entertainment
- Directed by: Alex Rudzinski

The 77th Primetime Emmy Awards honored the best in American prime time television programming from June 1, 2024, until May 31, 2025, as chosen by the Academy of Television Arts & Sciences. The awards ceremony was held live on September 14, 2025, at the Peacock Theater in Downtown Los Angeles, California, and was preceded by the 77th Primetime Creative Arts Emmy Awards on September 6 and 7. During the ceremony, Emmy Awards were presented in 26 categories. The ceremony was produced by Jesse Collins Entertainment, directed by Alex Rudzinski, and broadcast in the United States by CBS and Paramount+. Nate Bargatze hosted the event.

At the main ceremony, The Studio won four awards, including Outstanding Comedy Series, and The Pitt won three awards, including Outstanding Drama Series. Adolescence led all shows with six wins, including Outstanding Limited or Anthology Series. Other winning programs included Hacks, Last Week Tonight with John Oliver, and Severance with two wins each, and Andor, The Late Show with Stephen Colbert, The Penguin, Slow Horses, SNL50: The Anniversary Special, Somebody Somewhere, and The Traitors with one each. Including Creative Arts Emmys, The Studio led all shows with 13 wins, while HBO, alongside its partner HBO Max, and Netflix led all networks with 30 wins each.

== Winners and nominees ==
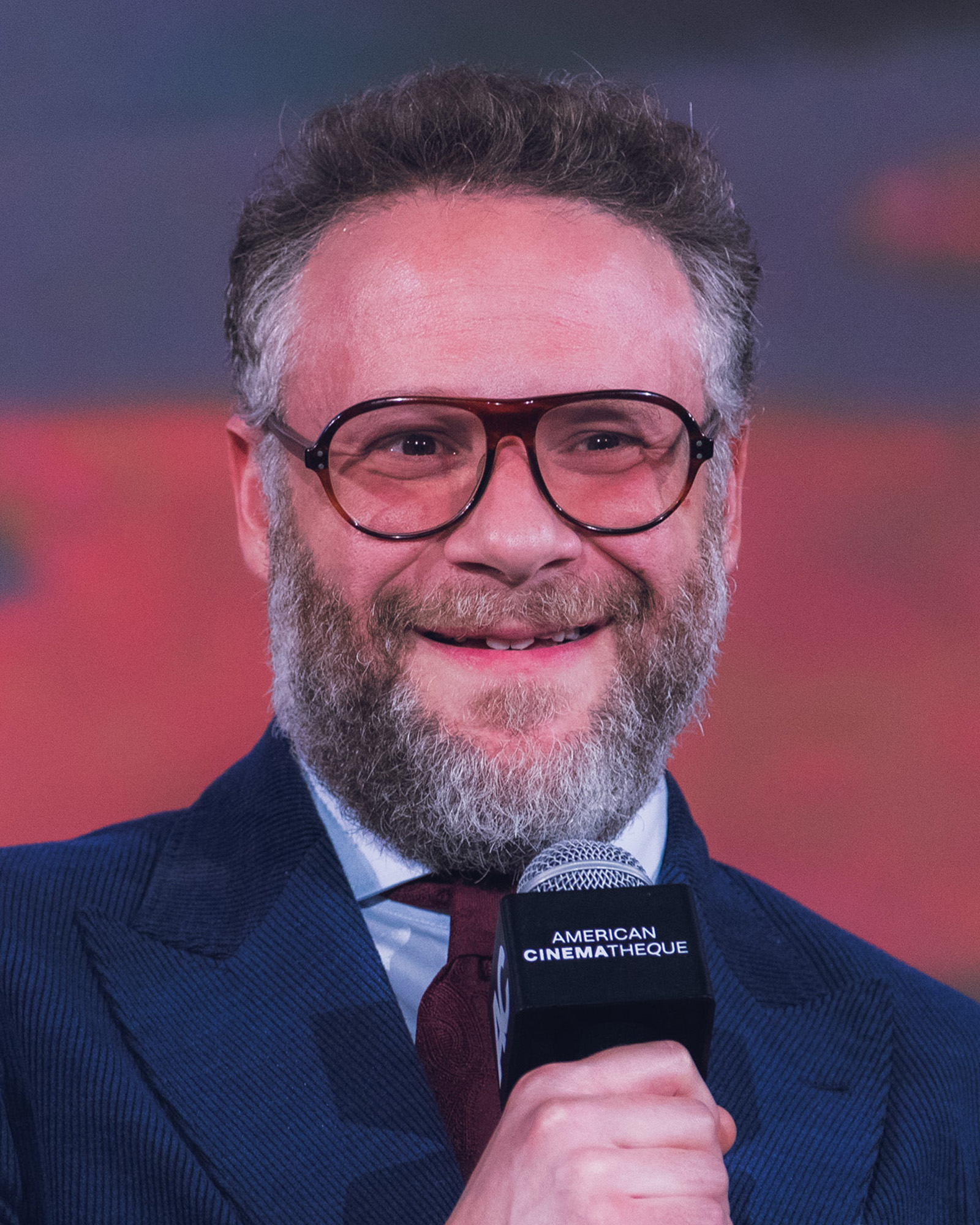
Seth Rogen, Outstanding Lead Actor in a Comedy Series winner

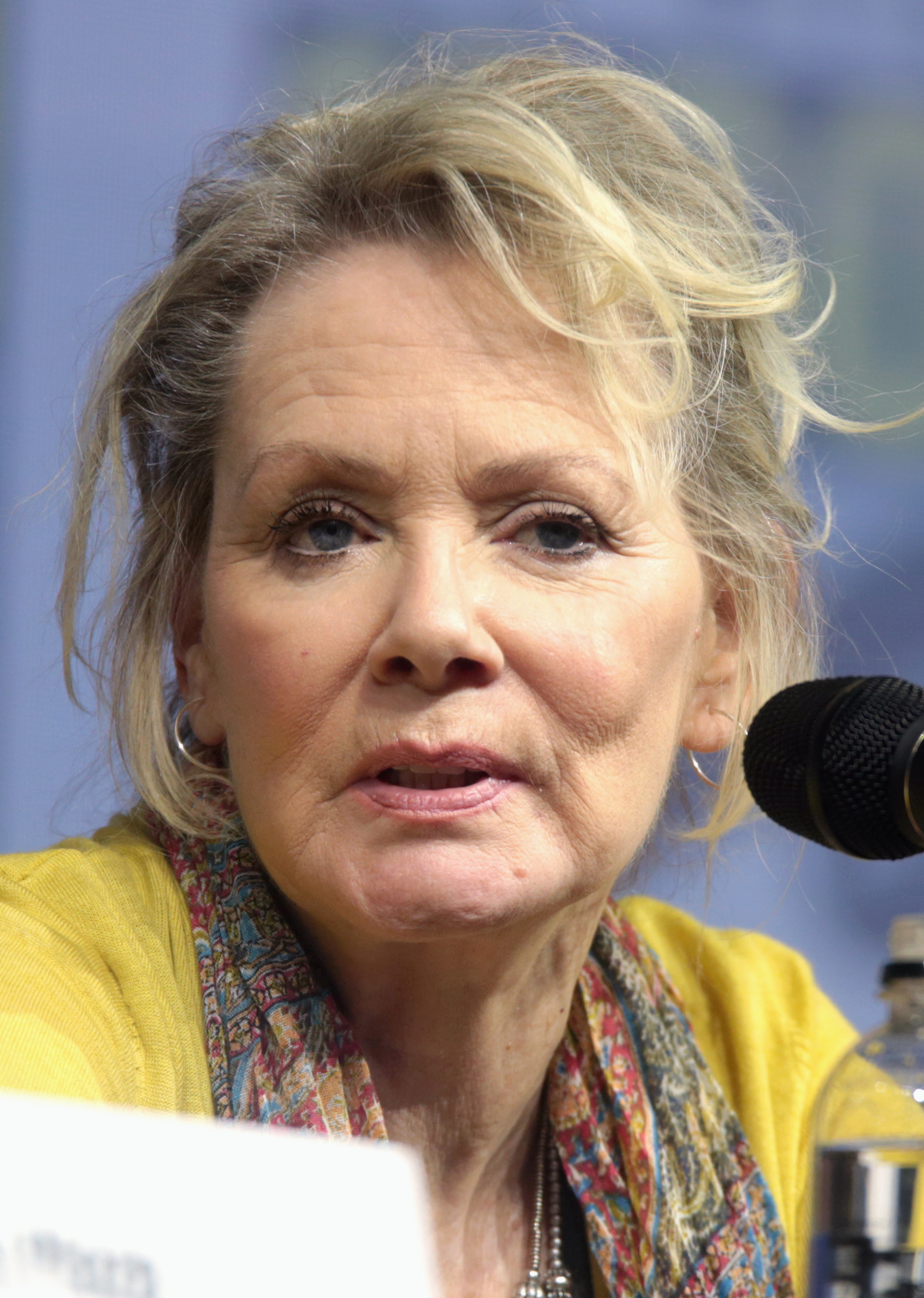
Jean Smart, Outstanding Lead Actress in a Comedy Series winner

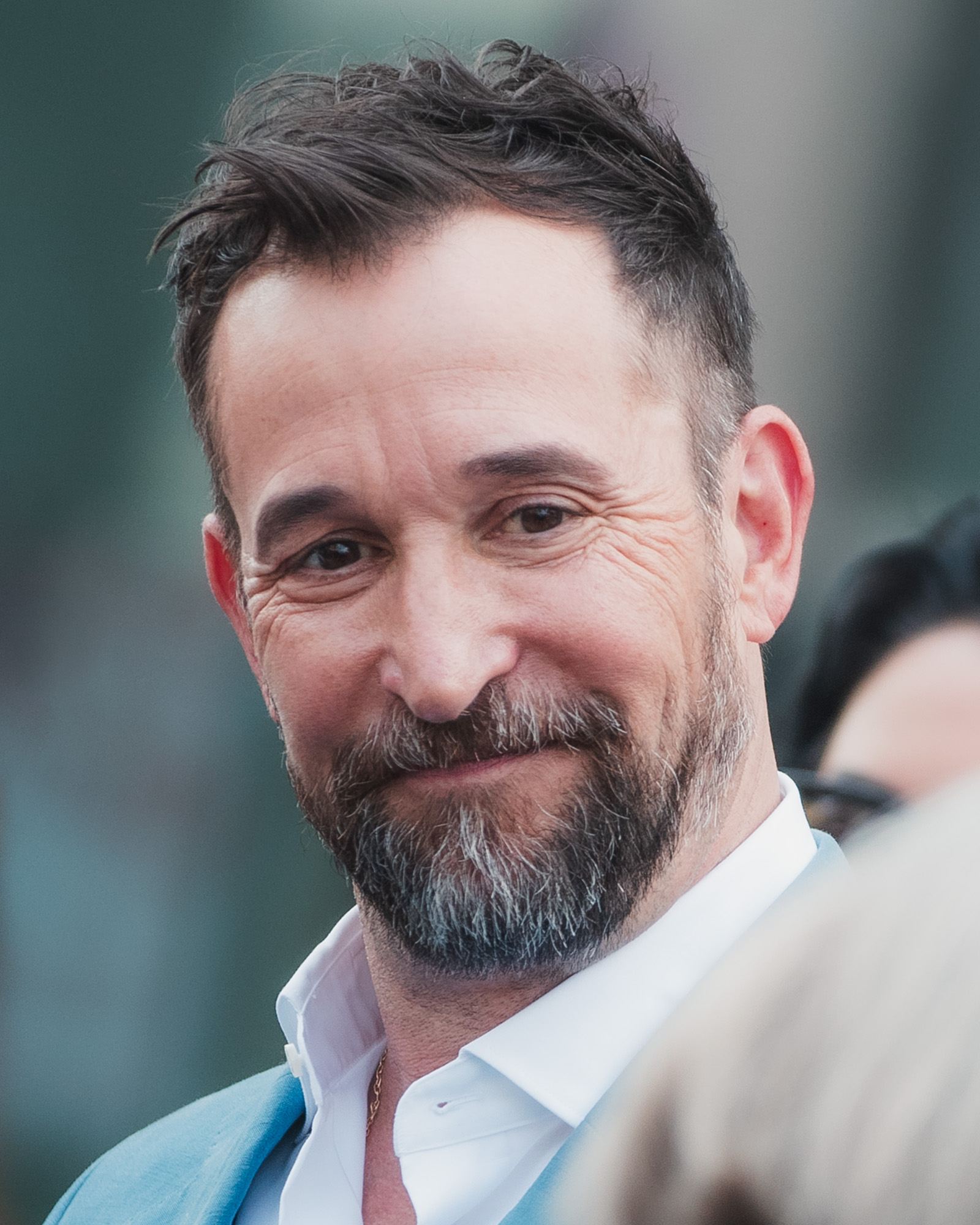
Noah Wyle, Outstanding Lead Actor in a Drama Series winner

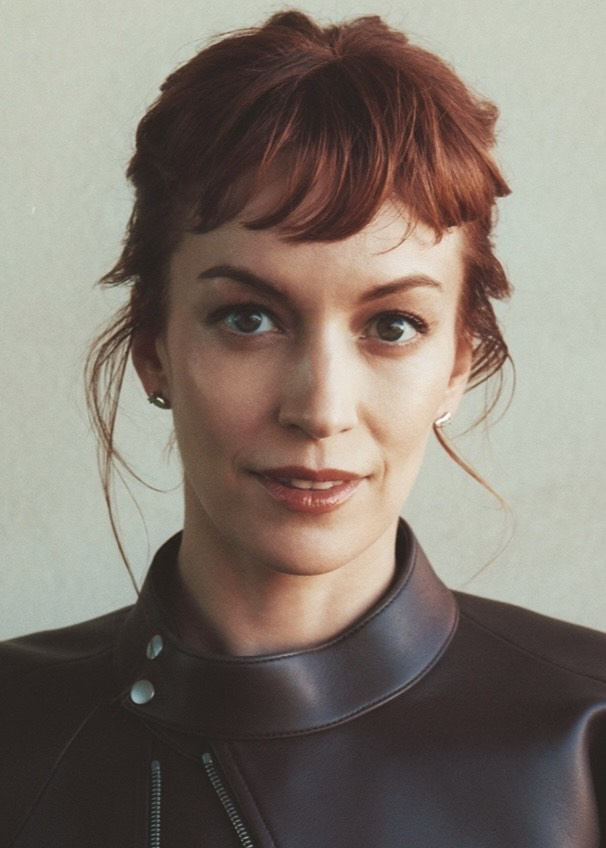
Britt Lower, Outstanding Lead Actress in a Drama Series winner

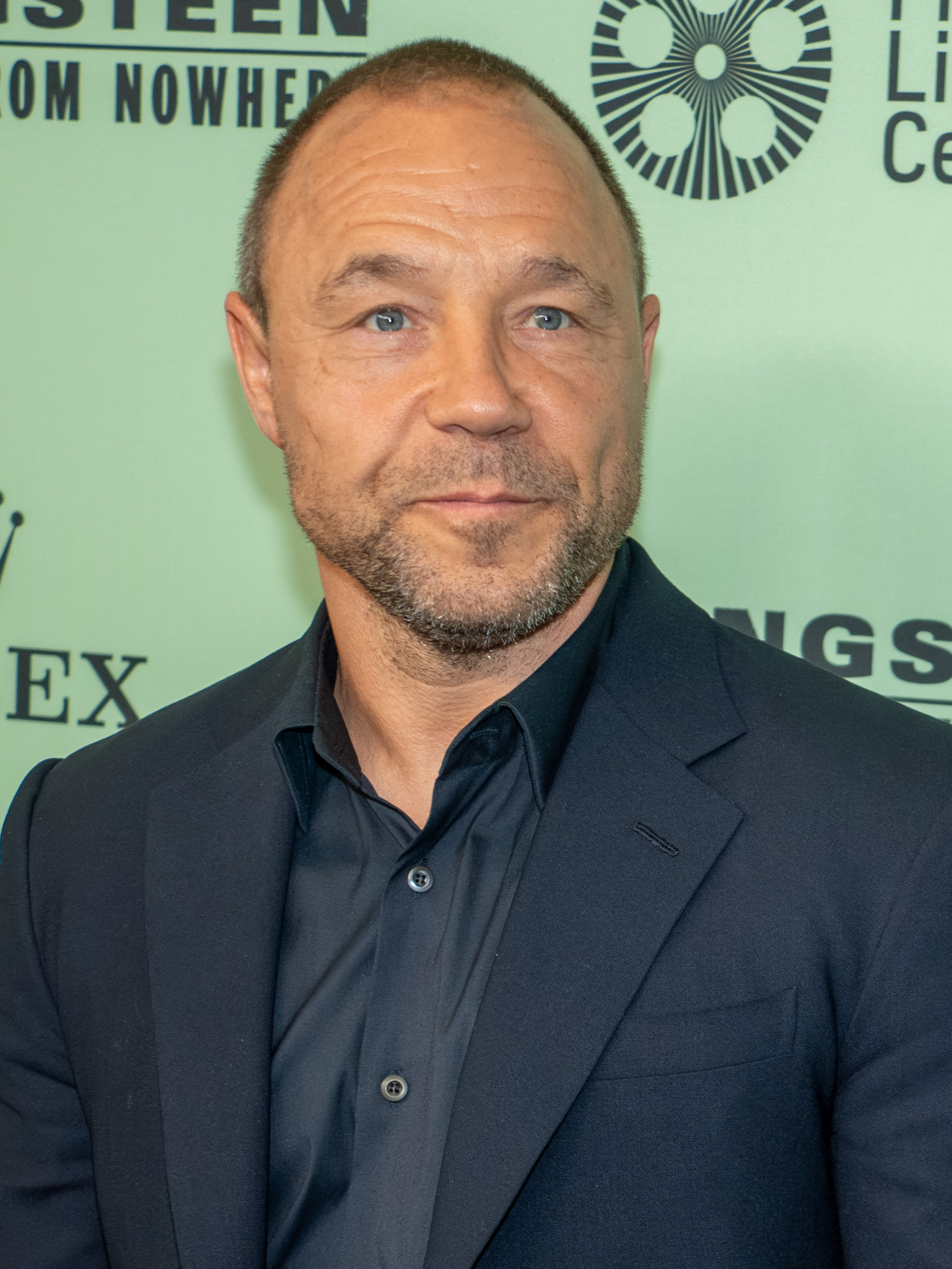
Stephen Graham, Outstanding Lead Actor in a Limited or Anthology Series or Movie winner

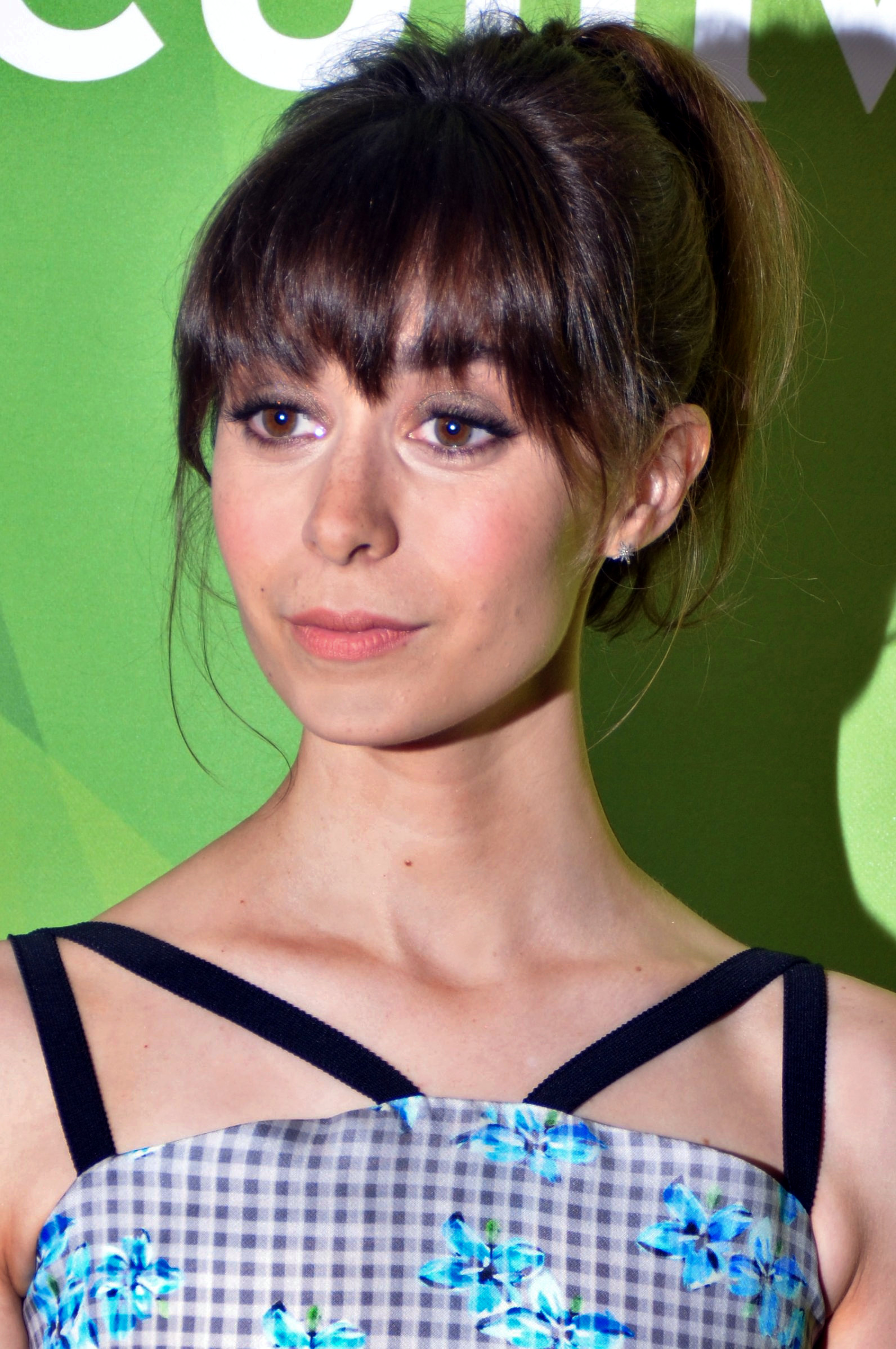
Cristin Milioti, Outstanding Lead Actress in a Limited or Anthology Series or Movie winner

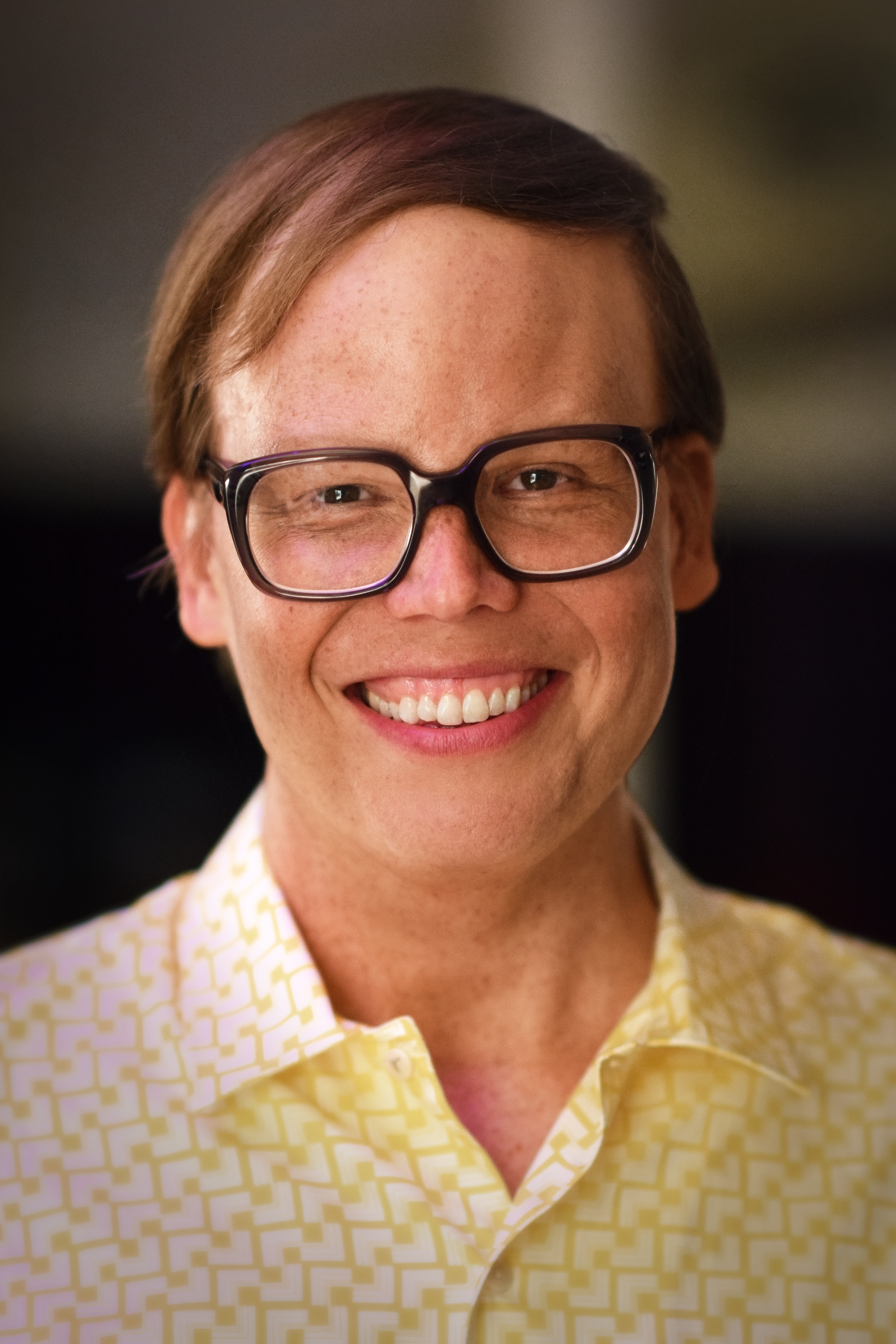
Jeff Hiller, Outstanding Supporting Actor in a Comedy Series winner

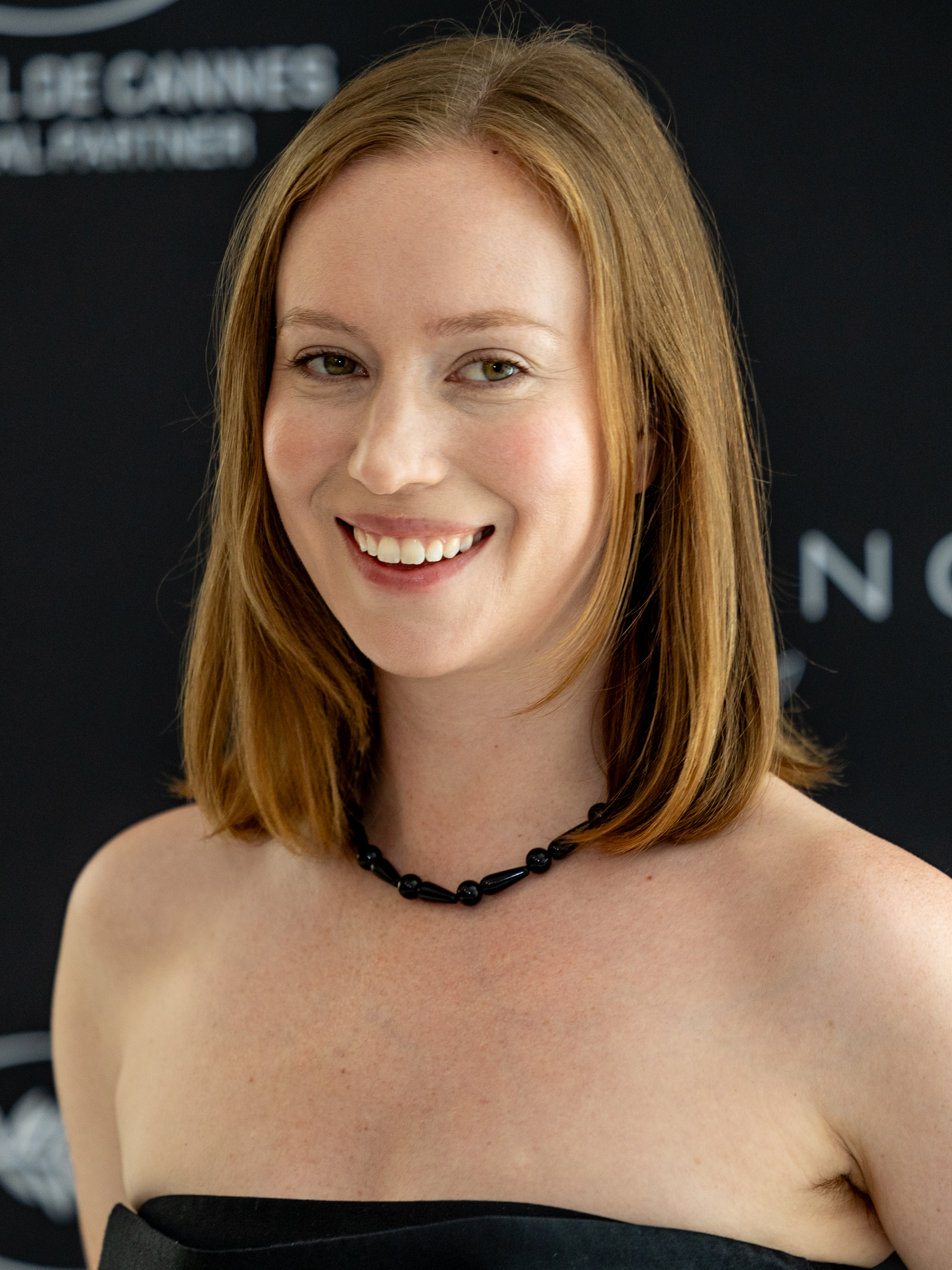
Hannah Einbinder, Outstanding Supporting Actress in a Comedy Series winner

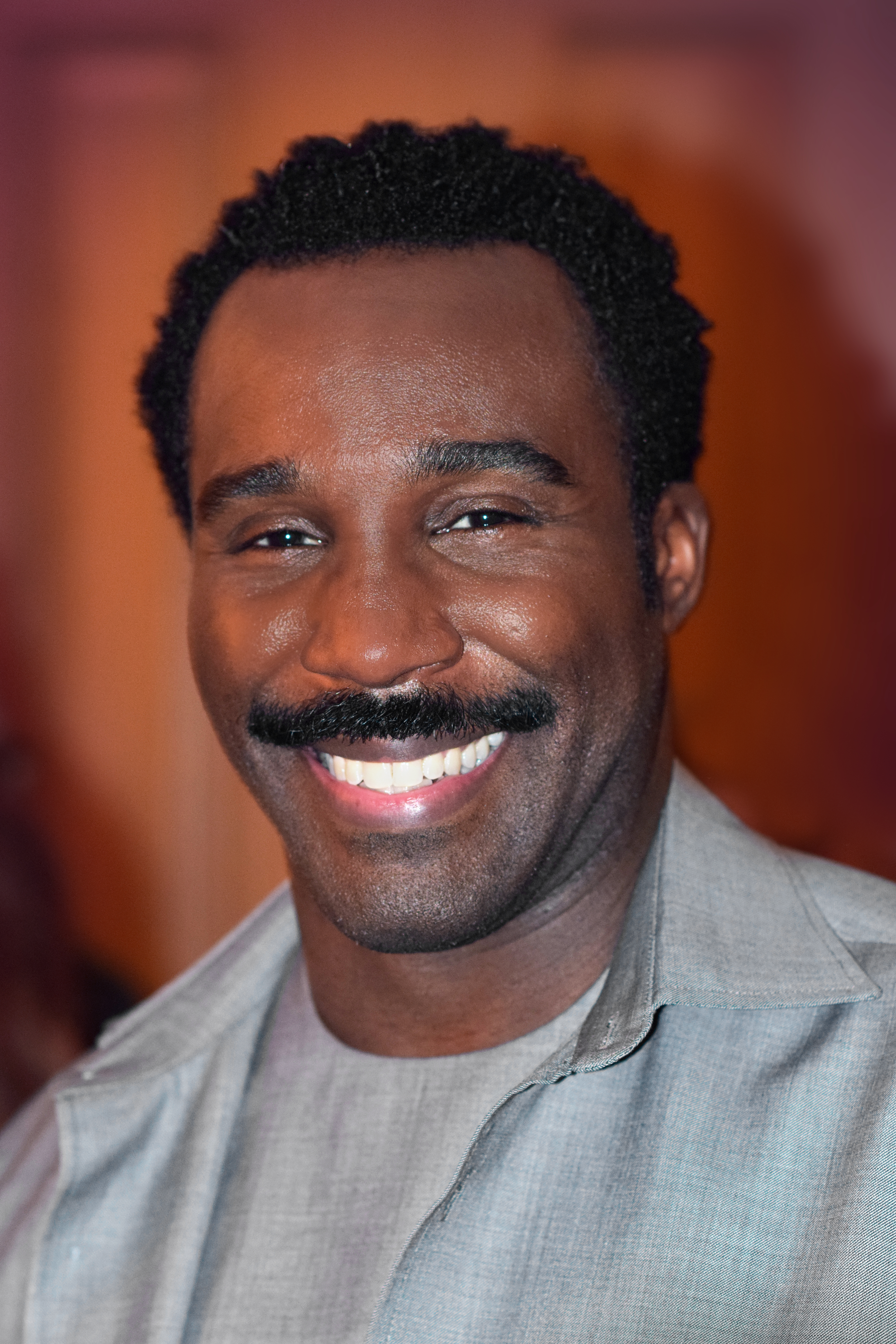
Tramell Tillman, Outstanding Supporting Actor in a Drama Series winner

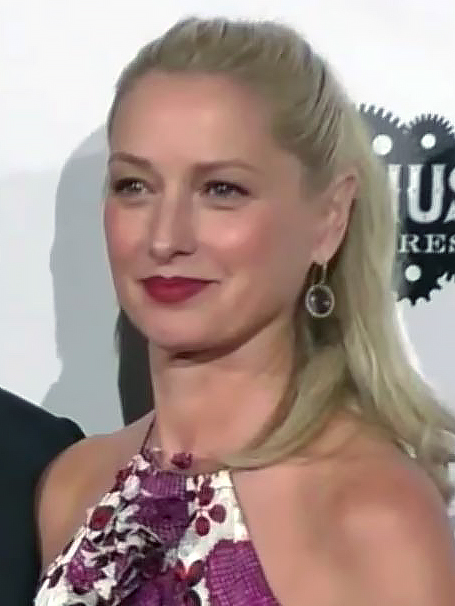
Katherine LaNasa, Outstanding Supporting Actress in a Drama Series winner

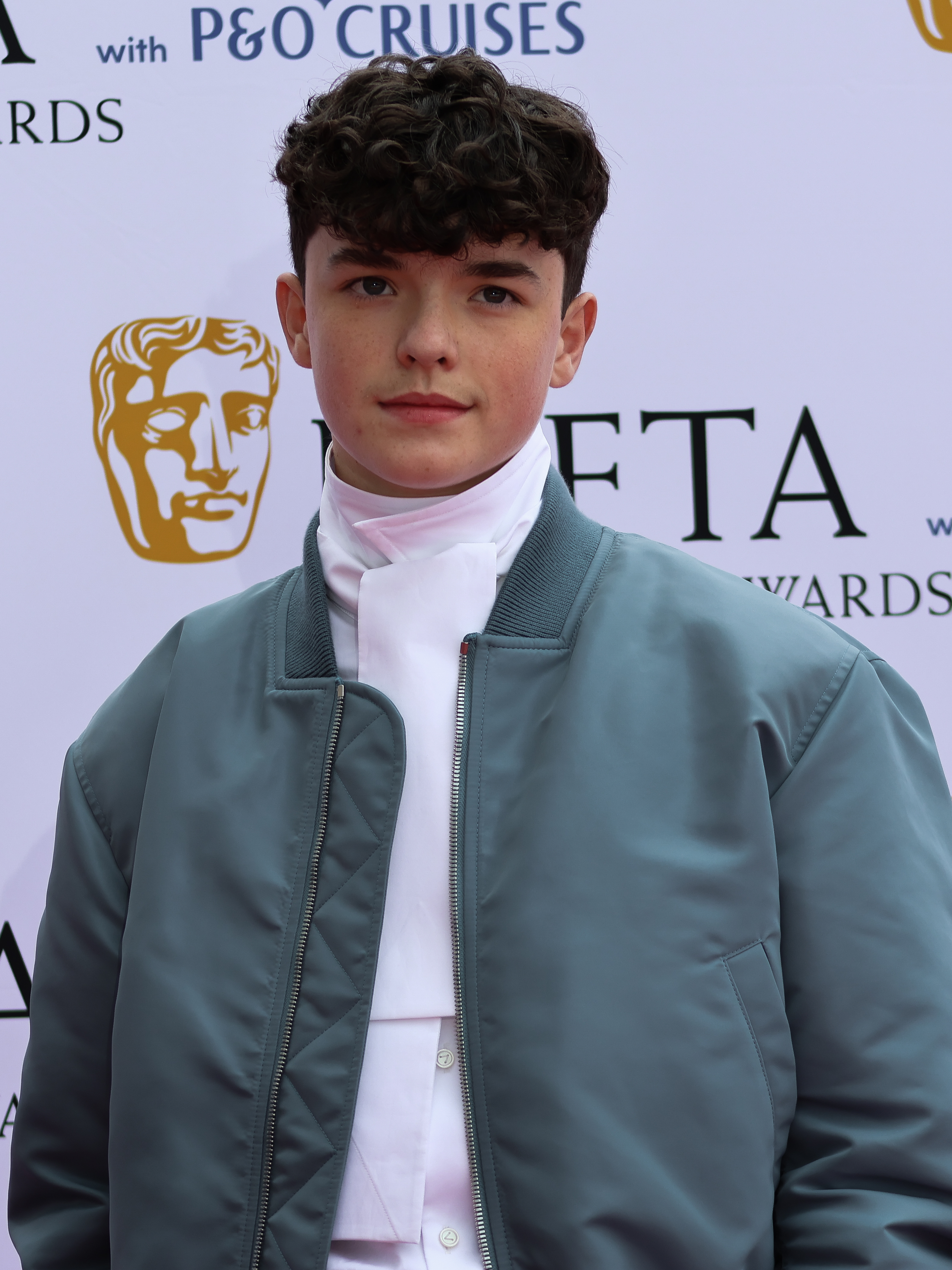
Owen Cooper, Outstanding Supporting Actor in a Limited or Anthology Series or Movie winner

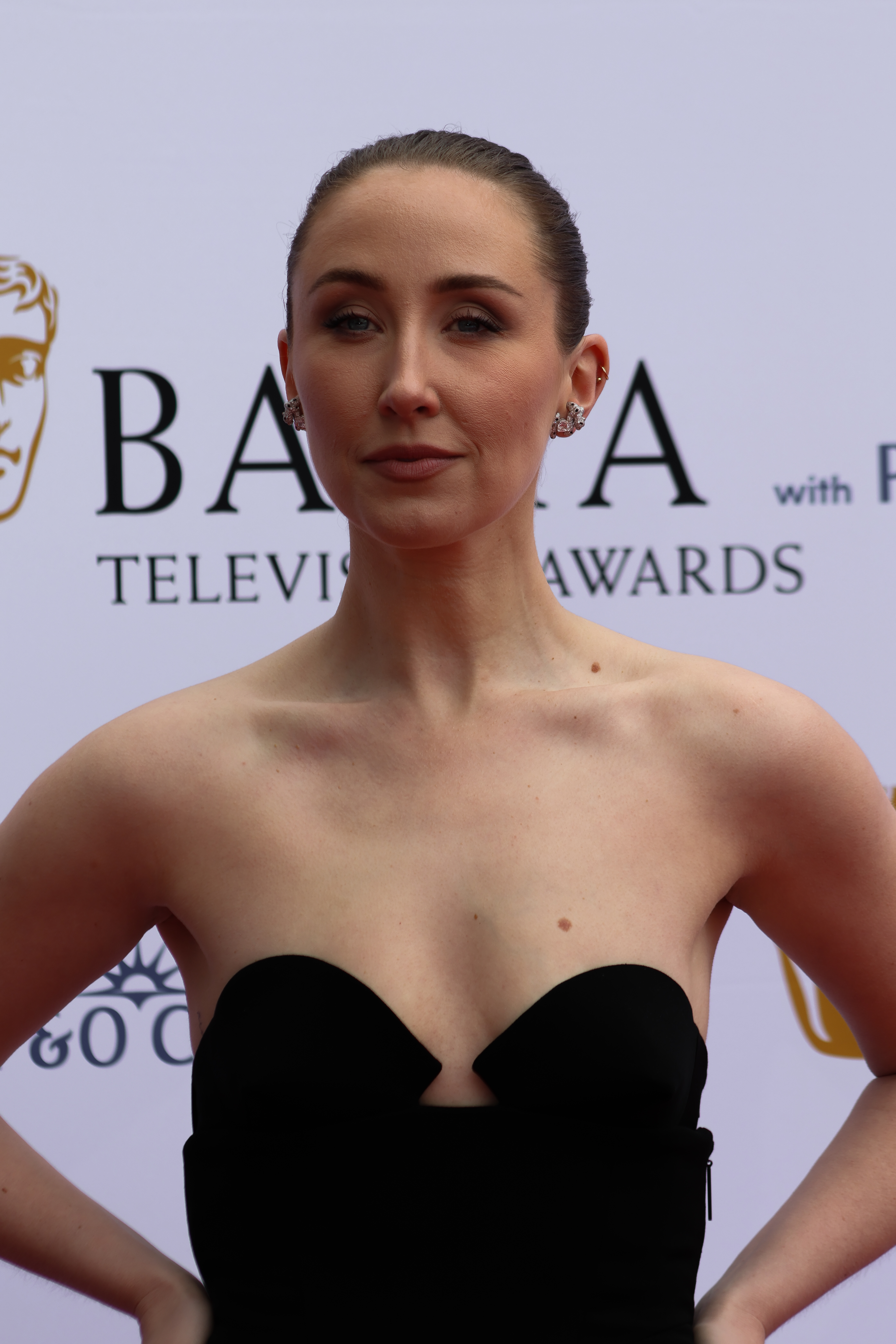
Erin Doherty, Outstanding Supporting Actress in a Limited or Anthology Series or Movie winner

The nominations for the 77th Primetime Emmy Awards were announced on July 15, 2025, at the Television Academy's Wolf Theatre in North Hollywood, Los Angeles, hosted by actor Harvey Guillén and actress Brenda Song, along with Television Academy chair Cris Abrego. The nominees for Outstanding Reality Competition Program and Outstanding Talk Series were revealed on CBS Mornings a few hours prior. Including nominations at the 77th Primetime Creative Arts Emmy Awards, Severance led all programs with 27 nominations, followed by The Penguin with 24 nominations. The Studio became the most-nominated first-year comedy series in the awards' history with 23 nominations; the Apple TV+ comedy surpassed the record held by the sports comedy Ted Lasso, which received 20 nominations in 2021. The series also tied The Bear's 23 nominations in the previous year for most nominations for a comedy series in a single season.

Sterling K. Brown, nominated for Outstanding Lead Actor in a Drama Series for his role in Paradise, tied with Andre Braugher and Don Cheadle for most nominations by a Black male performer with 11 nominations each. At age 77, Kathy Bates became the oldest nominee for Outstanding Lead Actress in a Drama Series for her performance in Matlock; she surpassed the record previously held by Angela Lansbury who was nominated at age 70 in 1996 for her role in Murder, She Wrote. At age 21, Bella Ramsey was the youngest two-time nominee for Outstanding Lead Actress in a Drama Series for their performance in The Last of Us. Ramsey was also the first openly non-binary person to be nominated more than once for an acting Emmy. At age 83, for his role on Shrinking, Harrison Ford became the second oldest nominee for Outstanding Supporting Actor in a Comedy Series behind Alan Arkin, who was nominated in that category at age 86 in 2020 for his work on The Kominsky Method. Ayo Edebiri, nominated for both Outstanding Lead Actress in a Comedy Series and Outstanding Directing for a Comedy Series for her work on The Bear, was the first Black woman nominated for both acting and directing in the same year. At age 29, Edebiri also became the youngest Black woman to receive three acting nominations in her career. For the first time in Emmys history, the nominees for Outstanding Writing for a Comedy Series had at least one woman included in each of the writing teams. HBO and its streaming service HBO Max led all networks and platforms with 142 nominations; Netflix came in second place with 120 nominations.

The winners were announced on September 14, following the Creative Arts Emmys on September 6 and 7. With 30 total wins each, HBO and its streaming service HBO Max tied with Netflix to lead all networks and platforms. Combined with its nine Creative Arts Emmys, The Studio was the most awarded comedy in a single year with thirteen wins, breaking The Bear's record of eleven from the previous year. It also surpassed the record for most wins by a freshman comedy series which was previously set by The Bear with ten awards in 2023. Seth Rogen won four awards for the aforementioned program to tie Moira Demos, Dan Levy, and Amy Sherman-Palladino for the most wins for an individual in one year. The Pitt became the first medical procedural to win Outstanding Drama Series since ER in 1996. Tramell Tillman was the first Black performer to win Outstanding Supporting Actor in a Drama Series for his work on Severance. At age 15, for his role in Adolescence, Owen Cooper became the youngest male acting winner in Emmy history, breaking a record previously held by Scott Jacoby who won Outstanding Performance by an Actor in a Supporting Role in a Drama in 1973 at age 16 for That Certain Summer.

Winners are listed first, highlighted in boldface, and indicated with a double dagger (‡). (Note: The outlets listed for each program are the U.S. broadcasters or streaming services identified in the nominations, which for some international productions are different than the broadcaster(s) that originally commissioned the program. Programs broadcast by HBO or HBO Max were listed under both services in the nominations list; only the original broadcaster is listed below.) For simplicity, producers who received nominations for program awards, as well as nominated writers for Outstanding Writing for a Variety Series, have been omitted.

=== Programs ===
**Outstanding Comedy Series**: **The Studio (Apple TV+)**‡; Abbott Elementary (ABC); The Bear (FX); Hacks (HBO Max); Nobody Wants This (Netflix); Only Murders in the Building (Hulu); Shrinking (Apple TV+); What We Do in the Shadows (FX)	**Outstanding Drama Series**: **The Pitt (HBO Max)**‡; Andor (Disney+); The Diplomat (Netflix); The Last of Us (HBO); Paradise (Hulu); Severance (Apple TV+); Slow Horses (Apple TV+); The White Lotus (HBO)
**Outstanding Limited or Anthology Series**: **Adolescence (Netflix)**‡; Black Mirror (Netflix); Dying for Sex (FX); Monsters: The Lyle and Erik Menendez Story (Netflix); The Penguin (HBO)	**Outstanding Reality Competition Program**: **The Traitors (Peacock)**‡; The Amazing Race (CBS); RuPaul's Drag Race (MTV); Survivor (CBS); Top Chef (Bravo)
**Outstanding Talk Series**: **The Late Show with Stephen Colbert (CBS)**‡; The Daily Show (Comedy Central); Jimmy Kimmel Live! (ABC)	**Outstanding Scripted Variety Series**: **Last Week Tonight with John Oliver (HBO)**‡; Saturday Night Live (NBC)
**Outstanding Variety Special (Live)**: **SNL50: The Anniversary Special (NBC)**‡; The Apple Music Super Bowl LIX Halftime Show Starring Kendrick Lamar (Fox); Beyoncé Bowl (Netflix); The Oscars (ABC); SNL50: The Homecoming Concert (Peacock)

=== Acting ===
==== Lead ====
**Outstanding Lead Actor in a Comedy Series**: **Seth Rogen – The Studio as Matt Remick (Apple TV+)**‡; Adam Brody – Nobody Wants This as Noah Roklov (Netflix); Jason Segel – Shrinking as Jimmy Laird (Apple TV+); Martin Short – Only Murders in the Building as Oliver Putnam (Hulu); Jeremy Allen White – The Bear as Carmen "Carmy" Berzatto (FX)	**Outstanding Lead Actress in a Comedy Series**: **Jean Smart – Hacks as Deborah Vance (HBO Max)**‡; Uzo Aduba – The Residence as Cordelia Cupp (Netflix); Kristen Bell – Nobody Wants This as Joanne (Netflix); Quinta Brunson – Abbott Elementary as Janine Teagues (ABC); Ayo Edebiri – The Bear as Sydney "Syd" Adamu (FX)
**Outstanding Lead Actor in a Drama Series**: **Noah Wyle – The Pitt as Dr. Michael "Robby" Robinavitch (HBO Max)**‡; Sterling K. Brown – Paradise as Xavier Collins (Hulu); Gary Oldman – Slow Horses as Jackson Lamb (Apple TV+); Pedro Pascal – The Last of Us as Joel Miller (HBO); Adam Scott – Severance as Mark Scout (Apple TV+)	**Outstanding Lead Actress in a Drama Series**: **Britt Lower – Severance as Helly R. (Apple TV+)**‡; Kathy Bates – Matlock as Madeline "Matty" Matlock / Madeline Kingston (CBS); Sharon Horgan – Bad Sisters as Eva Garvey (Apple TV+); Bella Ramsey – The Last of Us as Ellie (HBO); Keri Russell – The Diplomat as Katherine "Kate" Wyler (Netflix)
**Outstanding Lead Actor in a Limited or Anthology Series or Movie**: **Stephen Graham – Adolescence as Eddie Miller (Netflix)**‡; Colin Farrell – The Penguin as Oswald "Oz" Cobb / The Penguin (HBO); Jake Gyllenhaal – Presumed Innocent as Rozat "Rusty" Sabich (Apple TV+); Brian Tyree Henry – Dope Thief as Ray Driscoll (Apple TV+); Cooper Koch – Monsters: The Lyle and Erik Menendez Story as Erik Menendez (Netflix)	**Outstanding Lead Actress in a Limited or Anthology Series or Movie**: **Cristin Milioti – The Penguin as Sofia Falcone / Sofia Gigante (HBO)**‡; Cate Blanchett – Disclaimer as Catherine Ravenscroft (Apple TV+); Meghann Fahy – Sirens as Devon DeWitt (Netflix); Rashida Jones – Black Mirror: "Common People" as Amanda Waters (Netflix); Michelle Williams – Dying for Sex as Molly Kochan (FX)

==== Supporting ====
**Outstanding Supporting Actor in a Comedy Series**: **Jeff Hiller – Somebody Somewhere as Joel (HBO)**‡; Ike Barinholtz – The Studio as Sal Saperstein (Apple TV+); Colman Domingo – The Four Seasons as Danny (Netflix); Harrison Ford – Shrinking as Dr. Paul Rhoades (Apple TV+); Ebon Moss-Bachrach – The Bear as Richard "Richie" Jerimovich (FX); Michael Urie – Shrinking as Brian (Apple TV+); Bowen Yang – Saturday Night Live as Various Characters (NBC)	**Outstanding Supporting Actress in a Comedy Series**: **Hannah Einbinder – Hacks as Ava Daniels (HBO Max)**‡; Liza Colón-Zayas – The Bear as Tina Marrero (FX); Kathryn Hahn – The Studio as Maya Mason (Apple TV+); Janelle James – Abbott Elementary as Ava Coleman (ABC); Catherine O'Hara – The Studio as Patty Leigh (Apple TV+); Sheryl Lee Ralph – Abbott Elementary as Barbara Howard (ABC); Jessica Williams – Shrinking as Gaby Evans (Apple TV+)
**Outstanding Supporting Actor in a Drama Series**: **Tramell Tillman – Severance as Seth Milchick (Apple TV+)**‡; Zach Cherry – Severance as Dylan George (Apple TV+); Walton Goggins – The White Lotus as Rick Hatchett (HBO); Jason Isaacs – The White Lotus as Timothy Ratliff (HBO); James Marsden – Paradise as President Cal Bradford (Hulu); Sam Rockwell – The White Lotus as Frank (HBO); John Turturro – Severance as Irving Bailiff (Apple TV+)	**Outstanding Supporting Actress in a Drama Series**: **Katherine LaNasa – The Pitt as Dana Evans (HBO Max)**‡; Patricia Arquette – Severance as Harmony Cobel (Apple TV+); Carrie Coon – The White Lotus as Laurie Duffy (HBO); Julianne Nicholson – Paradise as Samantha "Sinatra" Redmond (Hulu); Parker Posey – The White Lotus as Victoria Ratliff (HBO); Natasha Rothwell – The White Lotus as Belinda Lindsey (HBO); Aimee Lou Wood – The White Lotus as Chelsea (HBO)
**Outstanding Supporting Actor in a Limited or Anthology Series or Movie**: **Owen Cooper – Adolescence as Jamie Miller (Netflix)**‡; Javier Bardem – Monsters: The Lyle and Erik Menendez Story as José Menendez (Netflix); Bill Camp – Presumed Innocent as Raymond Horgan (Apple TV+); Rob Delaney – Dying for Sex as Neighbor Guy (FX); Peter Sarsgaard – Presumed Innocent as Tommy Molto (Apple TV+); Ashley Walters – Adolescence as DI Luke Bascombe (Netflix)	**Outstanding Supporting Actress in a Limited or Anthology Series or Movie**: **Erin Doherty – Adolescence as Briony Ariston (Netflix)**‡; Ruth Negga – Presumed Innocent as Barbara Sabich (Apple TV+); Deirdre O'Connell – The Penguin as Francis Cobb (HBO); Chloë Sevigny – Monsters: The Lyle and Erik Menendez Story as Kitty Menendez (Netflix); Jenny Slate – Dying for Sex as Nikki Boyer (FX); Christine Tremarco – Adolescence as Manda Miller (Netflix)

=== Directing ===
**Outstanding Directing for a Comedy Series**: **The Studio: "The Oner" – Seth Rogen and Evan Goldberg (Apple TV+)**‡; The Bear: "Napkins" – Ayo Edebiri (FX); Hacks: "A Slippery Slope" – Lucia Aniello (HBO Max); Mid-Century Modern: "Here's to You, Mrs. Schneiderman" – James Burrows (Hulu); The Rehearsal: "Pilot's Code" – Nathan Fielder (HBO)	**Outstanding Directing for a Drama Series**: **Slow Horses: "Hello Goodbye" – Adam Randall (Apple TV+)**‡; Andor: "Who Are You?" – Janus Metz (Disney+); The Pitt: "6:00 P.M." – Amanda Marsalis (HBO Max); The Pitt: "7:00 A.M." – John Wells (HBO Max); Severance: "Chikhai Bardo" – Jessica Lee Gagné (Apple TV+); Severance: "Cold Harbor" – Ben Stiller (Apple TV+); The White Lotus: "Amor Fati" – Mike White (HBO)
**Outstanding Directing for a Limited or Anthology Series or Movie**: **Adolescence – Philip Barantini (Netflix)**‡; Dying for Sex: "It's Not That Serious" – Shannon Murphy (FX); The Penguin: "Cent'Anni" – Helen Shaver (HBO); The Penguin: "A Great or Little Thing" – Jennifer Getzinger (HBO); Sirens: "Exile" – Nicole Kassell (Netflix); Zero Day – Lesli Linka Glatter (Netflix)

=== Writing ===
**Outstanding Writing for a Comedy Series**: **The Studio: "The Promotion" – Seth Rogen, Evan Goldberg, Peter Huyck, Alex Gregory, and Frida Perez (Apple TV+)**‡; Abbott Elementary: "Back to School" – Quinta Brunson (ABC); Hacks: "A Slippery Slope" – Lucia Aniello, Paul W. Downs, and Jen Statsky (HBO Max); The Rehearsal: "Pilot's Code" – Nathan Fielder, Carrie Kemper, Adam Locke-Norton, and Eric Notarnicola (HBO); Somebody Somewhere: "AGG" – Hannah Bos, Paul Thureen, and Bridget Everett (HBO); What We Do in the Shadows: "The Finale" – Sam Johnson, Sarah Naftalis, and Paul Simms (FX)	**Outstanding Writing for a Drama Series**: **Andor: "Welcome to the Rebellion" – Dan Gilroy (Disney+)**‡; The Pitt: "2:00 P.M." – Joe Sachs (HBO Max); The Pitt: "7:00 A.M." – R. Scott Gemmill (HBO Max); Severance: "Cold Harbor" – Dan Erickson (Apple TV+); Slow Horses: "Hello Goodbye" – Will Smith (Apple TV+); The White Lotus: "Full-Moon Party" – Mike White (HBO)
**Outstanding Writing for a Limited or Anthology Series or Movie**: **Adolescence – Jack Thorne and Stephen Graham (Netflix)**‡; Black Mirror: "Common People" – Story by : Charlie Brooker and Bisha K. Ali Teleplay by : Charlie Brooker (Netflix); Dying for Sex: "Good Value Diet Soda" – Story by : Kim Rosenstock and Elizabeth Meriwether Teleplay by : Kim Rosenstock (FX); The Penguin: "A Great or Little Thing" – Lauren LeFranc (HBO); Say Nothing: "The People in the Dirt" – Joshua Zetumer (FX)	**Outstanding Writing for a Variety Series**: **Last Week Tonight with John Oliver (HBO)**‡; The Daily Show (Comedy Central); Saturday Night Live (NBC)

=== Bob Hope Humanitarian Award ===
The Bob Hope Humanitarian Award was presented to married actors Ted Danson and Mary Steenburgen, in recognition of "a lifetime of extraordinary philanthropy, activism and unwavering commitment to global good". This marked the first time the award was presented to a couple.

=== Nominations and wins by program ===
For the purposes of the lists below, "major" constitutes the categories listed above (program, acting, directing, and writing), while "total" includes the categories presented at the Creative Arts Emmy Awards. Programs and networks must have multiple wins or major nominations or at least five total nominations to be included.

Programs with multiple nominations
Nominations		Program	Network
Total	Major	Program	Network
27	10	Severance	Apple TV+
24	7	The Penguin	HBO
23	10	The White Lotus	HBO
23	7	The Studio	Apple TV+
16	3	The Last of Us	HBO
14	5	Hacks	HBO Max
14	3	Andor	Disney+
13	8	Adolescence	Netflix
13	7	The Pitt	HBO Max
13	6	The Bear	FX
12	1	SNL50: The Anniversary Special	NBC
11	4	Monsters: The Lyle and Erik Menendez Story	Netflix
10	3	Black Mirror	Netflix
9	6	Dying for Sex	FX
8	2	The Daily Show	Comedy Central
8	1	RuPaul's Drag Race	MTV
7	5	Shrinking	Apple TV+
7	3	Saturday Night Live	NBC
7	2	Only Murders in the Building	Hulu
6	5	Abbott Elementary	ABC
6	2	Last Week Tonight with John Oliver	HBO
6	2	What We Do in the Shadows	FX
6	1	The Amazing Race	CBS
6	1	The Oscars	ABC
6	1	SNL50: The Homecoming Concert	Peacock
6	0	House of the Dragon	HBO
6	0	The Righteous Gemstones	HBO
5	4	Slow Horses	Apple TV+
5	1	Beyoncé Bowl	Netflix
5	1	The Traitors	Peacock
5	0	Bridgerton	Netflix
5	0	Love on the Spectrum	Netflix
5	0	Pee-wee as Himself	HBO
5	0	The Voice	NBC
5	0	Will & Harper	Netflix
<5	4	Paradise	Hulu
<5	4	Presumed Innocent	Apple TV+
<5	3	Nobody Wants This	Netflix
<5	2	The Diplomat	Netflix
<5	2	The Rehearsal	HBO
<5	2	Sirens	Netflix
<5	2	Somebody Somewhere	HBO

Programs with multiple wins
Wins		Program	Network
Total	Major	Program	Network
13	4	The Studio	Apple TV+
9	1	The Penguin	HBO
8	6	Adolescence	Netflix
8	2	Severance	Apple TV+
8	1	SNL50: The Anniversary Special	NBC
5	1	Andor	Disney+
5	3	The Pitt	HBO Max
5	1	The Traitors	Peacock
4	0	Arcane	Netflix
4	0	Love, Death & Robots	Netflix
3	0	The Boys	Prime Video
3	0	Bridgerton	Netflix
3	2	Hacks	HBO Max
3	0	Pee-wee as Himself	HBO
3	0	Saturday Night Live	NBC
2	0	67th Annual Grammy Awards	CBS
2	0	100 Foot Wave	HBO
2	0	The Daily Show: Desi Lydic Foxsplains	YouTube
2	2	Last Week Tonight with John Oliver	HBO
2	1	The Late Show with Stephen Colbert	CBS
2	0	Love on the Spectrum	Netflix
2	0	Welcome to Wrexham	FX

=== Nominations and wins by network ===
Networks with multiple nominations
Nominations		Network
Total	Major	Network
142	38	HBO / HBO Max
120	26	Netflix
79	33	Apple TV+
37	7	ABC
35	15	FX
29	4	NBC
28	3	Disney+
26	4	CBS
23	7	Hulu
19	2	Peacock
12	0	Prime Video
10	2	Comedy Central
10	1	MTV
7	1	Fox
7	0	Paramount+
5	0	Nat Geo

Networks with multiple wins
Wins		Network
Total	Major	Network
30	9	HBO / HBO Max
30	6	Netflix
22	7	Apple TV+
11	1	NBC
7	1	Disney+
5	1	Peacock
5	0	Prime Video
4	1	CBS
3	0	ABC
2	0	FX
2	0	YouTube

== Presenters ==
The following people presented awards or other segments:

Presenters at the ceremony
Name(s)	Role
Stephen Colbert	Presented the award for Outstanding Lead Actor in a Comedy Series
Jennifer Coolidge	Presented the award for Outstanding Lead Actress in a Comedy Series
Jenna Ortega Catherine Zeta-Jones	Presented the award for Outstanding Supporting Actress in a Drama Series
Jason Bateman Jude Law	Presented the award for Outstanding Supporting Actor in a Drama Series
Angela Bassett	Presented the award for Outstanding Lead Actress in a Drama Series
Karen Fairchild Reba McEntire Kimberly Schlapman	Tribute to the 40th anniversary of The Golden Girls; Presented the award for Outstanding Supporting Actress in a Comedy Series
Leanne Morgan	Presented the award for Outstanding Reality Competition Program
Sterling K. Brown James Marsden Julianne Nicholson	Presented the award for Outstanding Supporting Actor in a Comedy Series
Walton Goggins Parker Posey	Presented the award for Outstanding Directing for a Comedy Series
Elizabeth Banks	Presented the award for Outstanding Directing for a Limited or Anthology Series or Movie
Jesse Williams	Presented the award for Outstanding Directing for a Drama Series
Jeff Probst	Tribute to the 25th anniversary of Survivor; Presented the award for Outstanding Scripted Variety Series
Hiroyuki Sanada Anna Sawai	Presented the award for Outstanding Writing for a Drama Series
Sydney Sweeney	Presented the award for Outstanding Supporting Actor in a Limited or Anthology Series or Movie
Ike Barinholtz Kathryn Hahn	Presented the award for Outstanding Writing for a Limited or Anthology Series or Movie
Alexis Bledel Lauren Graham	Tribute to the 25th anniversary of Gilmore Girls; Presented the award for Outstanding Writing for a Comedy Series
Tina Fey	Presented the award for Outstanding Variety Special (Live)
Kathy Bates Alan Cumming	Presented the award for Outstanding Writing for a Variety Series
Young Mazino Hunter Schafer	Presented the award for Outstanding Supporting Actress in a Limited or Anthology Series or Movie
Charlie Hunnam	Presented the award for Outstanding Lead Actress in a Limited or Anthology Series or Movie
Justin Hartley	Introduced the chairman of the Television Academy, Cris Abrego
Kristen Bell Michael Schur	Presented the Bob Hope Humanitarian Award to Ted Danson and Mary Steenburgen
Phylicia Rashad	Presented the In Memoriam segment
Malin Akerman Brittany Snow	Presented the award for Outstanding Lead Actor in a Limited or Anthology Series or Movie
Bryan Cranston	Presented the award for Outstanding Talk Series
Sarah Paulson Evan Peters	Presented the award for Outstanding Limited or Anthology Series
Brad Garrett Ray Romano	Presented the award for Outstanding Comedy Series
Colman Domingo	Presented the award for Outstanding Lead Actor in a Drama Series
Tony Goldwyn Ice-T Mariska Hargitay Christopher Meloni S. Epatha Merkerson	Tribute to the 35th anniversary of the Law & Order franchise; Presented the award for Outstanding Drama Series

== Ceremony information ==
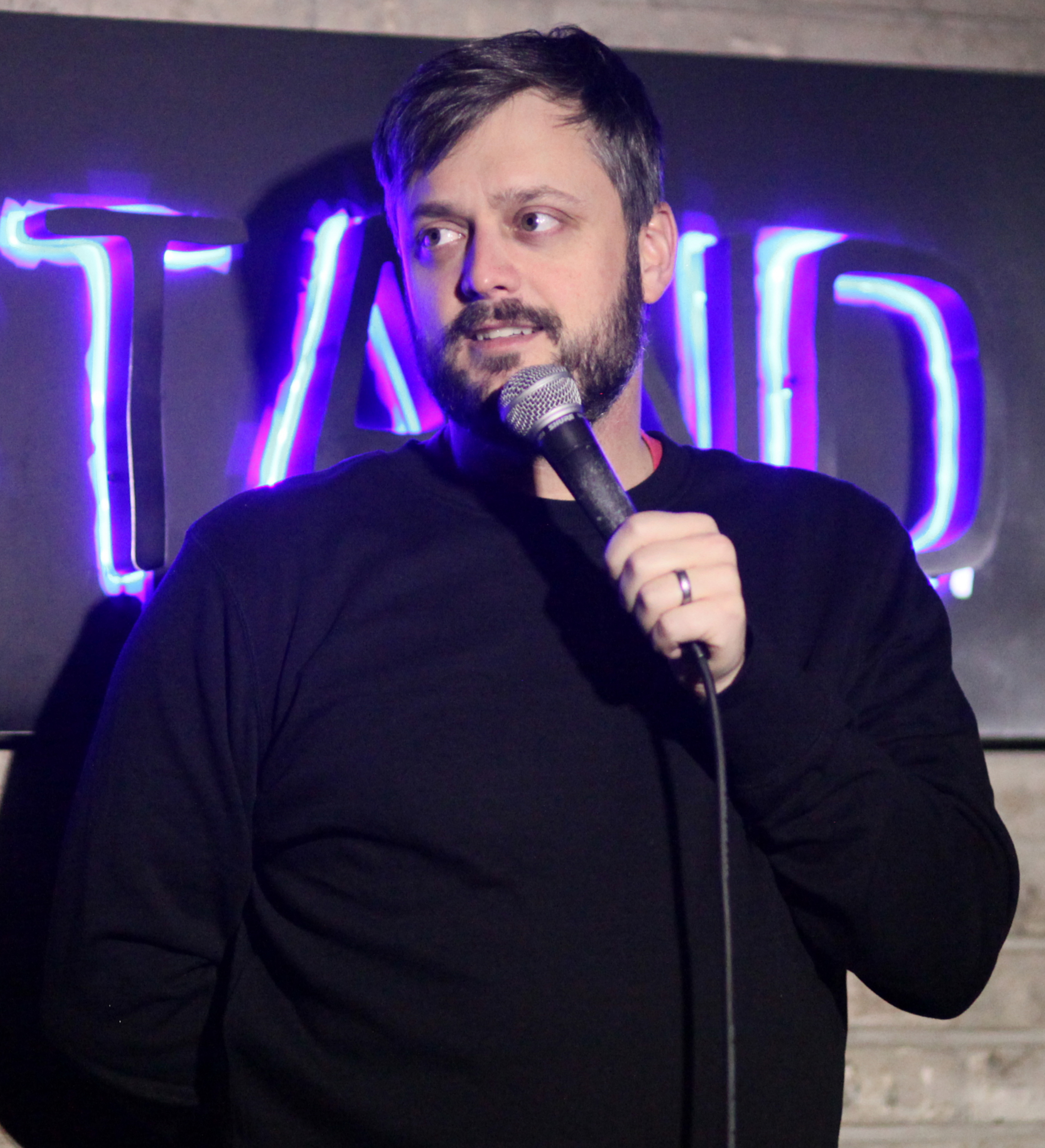
Nate Bargatze hosted the ceremony.

On March 5, 2025, the Academy of Television Arts & Sciences, also known as the Television Academy, announced that the 77th Primetime Emmy Awards would be held on September 14. CBS broadcast the ceremony as part of a rotating deal among the "Big Four" networks (ABC, CBS, Fox, and NBC) signed in 2018. Additionally, it was announced that the ceremony would be available live and on-demand via Paramount Skydance's streaming service Paramount+. The ceremony was produced by Jesse Collins Entertainment (Jesse Collins, Dionne Harmon, and Jeannae Rouzan-Clay) for the third consecutive year. On April 16, comedian Nate Bargatze was announced as the ceremony's host.

During a press conference held on September 11 promoting the show, producer Collins revealed that the ceremony would feature reunions in tribute to the 25th anniversaries of The CW and WB comedy-drama series Gilmore Girls and CBS reality competition series Survivor, and the 35th anniversary of NBC's police procedural franchise Law & Order. Additionally, the telecast would pay tribute to the 40th anniversary of the NBC sitcom The Golden Girls with country singer Reba McEntire and Little Big Town's Karen Fairchild and Kimberly Schlapman performing the series' theme song, "Thank You for Being a Friend". Eric Dane and Jesse Williams were initially scheduled as co-presenters to honor the 20th anniversary of ABC medical drama Grey's Anatomy, but Dane was absent from the ceremony while Williams presented alone. According to Collins, he told reporters for Variety after the awards ceremony, "I just was told that he wasn't able to make it, and fortunately, Jesse was able to present by himself." The following month, Dane revealed during an interview with The Washington Post that he was recovering from a fall he suffered in his kitchen shortly before the ceremony. He had previously been diagnosed with ALS in April 2025.

In an effort to shorten winners' acceptance speeches and have the telecast run on time, Bargatze revealed that he would donate $100,000 to the Boys & Girls Club of America. However, for every second an award winner's speech went over the 45-second limit $1,000 would be deducted from the donation. Similarly, for every second under the limit another $1,000 would be added. At the end of the show, the sum of money slated be donated fell $60,000 below zero due to several winners' speech going over the time limit. As a result, Bargatze stated that CBS would donate the full $100,000 to the charity, and that he would add an additional $250,000.

Several other individuals were involved with the production of the telecast. Alex Rudzinski and Rickey Minor served as director and musical director for the ceremony, respectively. Entertainment Tonight co-anchors Kevin Frazier and Nischelle Turner hosted a red carpet pre-show preceding the telecast. Comedians Mikey Day, James Austin Johnson, and Bowen Yang participated in an opening comedy sketch with Bargatze parodying how Philo Farnsworth invented television, similar to the "Washington's Dream" sketch featured in a 50th season episode of Saturday Night Live.

=== Category and rule changes ===
On January 8, 2025, the Television Academy announced rule changes that affected the directing and guest performer awards. Starting with the 77th ceremony, individuals or directing teams are permitted to submit multiple episodes for consideration in the directing categories, provided that the episodes are from different programs. In previous years, directors or directing teams could only submit one entry per category. Additionally, any performer who previously won or has been nominated in the lead or supporting acting categories would be ineligible to submit a performance of the same character in the same series for consideration in the guest performance categories in subsequent years.

On July 22, 2025, it was announced that Outstanding Writing for a Variety Series would be presented at the main ceremony, replacing Outstanding Writing for a Variety Special, which was presented at the Creative Arts ceremony held on September 7. Two weeks later, the Television Academy moved the presentation for Outstanding Variety Special (Live) to the main ceremony as well.

=== Critical reviews and viewership ===
The broadcast generally received mixed to negative reviews from critics. Aramide Tinubu, writing for Variety, found the onslaught of surprise winners adding to the excitement, but criticized host Bargatze's performance and wrote, "He lacked the enthusiasm and gumption needed to lead a three-hour-long award program and often seemed stunned to be in the spotlight." She also noted that the decision to have a forty-five second acceptance speech rule to caused winners to hurriedly rush through their speeches while contrasting that with presenters' introductions that seemed to drag down the ceremony. Daniel Feinberg of The Hollywood Reporter wrote, "It was an ill-conceived mess, punctuated by well-deserved wins and emotional and effective speeches, but rarely helped by Bargatze's consistently uneasy performance." Brian Lowry of TheWrap commented, "Unfortunately, racing through the speeches came at too high a cost for the show itself, one that played out in uneven pacing and awkward moments strewn throughout." He concluded that due to the time limit, the ceremony was "an otherwise bland affair, which, one suspects, is just the way the Television Academy wanted it."

In a more positive review, Robert Lloyd of the Los Angeles Times complimented the show and wrote of host Bargatze, "If your goal was to avoid insulted celebrities, social media outrage or petulant notes from the White House, you could have done no better than to hire Bargatze, a clean, calm, classical, noncontroversial, nonpolitical, very funny, very successful comedian." He also reserved praise for several presenters, including Stephen Colbert, Brad Garrett, and Ray Romano. Matt Roush of TV Insider wrote, "There was a sense that for all of the ribbing, this Emmys broadcast was a pleasurable celebration of an ever-evolving medium." He also gave high marks toward Bargatze, but criticized the acceptance speech 45-second rule as tiresome. David Nemetz of TVLine wrote, "These Emmys were strangely anti-TV at times, with a self-deprecating tone that bordered on masochistic. But they also showcased the best that TV has to offer, with surprise wins and stirring speeches that reminded us of the sheer quantity of top-notch programming we're blessed to have at our fingertips right now."

The ceremony was viewed by 7.59 million people in the United States, making it the most-viewed Emmys in four years, representing a 10% increase over the previous year's ceremony. It also achieved a 1.28 rating among adults ages 18–49. Ratings figures included those who watched the telecast on CBS or streamed it on Paramount+.

== In Memoriam ==
The annual In Memoriam segment was presented by Phylicia Rashad, and featured Vince Gill and Lainey Wilson performing Gill's song "Go Rest High on That Mountain".

- Malcolm-Jamal Warner – performer
- Julian McMahon – performer
- Valerie Mahaffey – performer
- Teri Garr – performer
- Gary Smith – producer
- Allan Blye – writer, producer
- Terry Louise Fisher – writer, producer
- David W. Duclon – writer, producer
- Jonathan Kaplan – director
- Glenn Padnick – executive
- Larry Auerbach – talent agent
- Robin Kaye – music supervisor
- Mark Snow – composer
- Ozzy Osbourne – musician
- Loni Anderson – performer
- Alan Rachins – performer
- Ruth Buzzi – performer
- Chuck Woolery – host
- Anne Burrell – host
- Wink Martindale – host
- Jeff Margolis – director
- Dave Flebotte – writer, producer
- Jeri Taylor – writer, producer
- Marty Callner – director
- Tony Etz – talent agent
- Ronnie Yeskel – casting director
- David Steinberg – manager
- Bill Moyers – journalist
- Dorothy Fox – hairstylist
- Skip Brittenham – attorney
- George Wendt – performer
- Alf Clausen – composer
- Richard Chamberlain – performer
- Michelle Trachtenberg – performer
- Toni Vaz – stunt performer
- Lane Leavitt – stunt performer, Television Academy governor
- Judith Jamison – choreographer
- Peter Kwong – performer, Television Academy governor
- Don Mischer – director, producer
- Loretta Swit – performer
- John Amos – performer
- Maggie Smith – performer
- David Lynch – writer, director
- Linda Lavin – performer
- Quincy Jones – composer, producer

At the beginning of the tribute, Rashad briefly eulogized Warner.
