= List of About a Boy episodes =

About a Boy is an American comedy television series created by Jason Katims for NBC, based on the 1998 novel of the same title by Nick Hornby and using elements from the 2002 film screenplay by Peter Hedges, Chris Weitz and Paul Weitz. The series premiered on February 22, 2014 with a special preview of the pilot episode, before moving to its regular time slot on Tuesday, March 4, 2014, 9:00 pm EST following The Voice.

Successful songwriter and bachelor Will Freeman (David Walton) lives a carefree life as the "ultimate man-child". His perfect world is turned upside down when single mom Fiona (Minnie Driver) and her charming, yet socially awkward 11-year-old son Marcus (Benjamin Stockham) move in next door.

With the exception of the pilot episode, all episodes start with the term "About a...". A total of 33 episodes have been produced over two seasons, only 27 of which aired before being canceled on May 8, 2015. The remaining six episodes were released via VoD (Amazon Prime Video, iTunes, Google Play) on July 20, 2015.

== Series overview ==
Season	Episodes	Originally released	
Season	Episodes	First released	Last released
1	13	February 22, 2014	May 13, 2014
2	20	October 14, 2014	July 20, 2015

== Episodes ==
=== Season 1 (2014) ===
No. overall	No. in season	Title	Directed by	Written by	Original release date	U.S. viewers (millions)
1	1	"Pilot"	Jon Favreau	Jason Katims	February 22, 2014	8.26
Will Freeman's perfect, charmed life is thrown a curve ball when he meets his eccentric new neighbor Fiona Bowa and her oddball son Marcus, who befriends him while running from bullies.
2	2	"About Total Exuberance"	Todd Holland	Jason Katims	March 4, 2014	8.36
Fiona asks Will to babysit Marcus while she interviews for a job, but Will receives a last-minute invite to a wild pool party, complicating matters; Fiona herself discovers a lesson in honesty.
3	3	"About a Godfather"	Michael Weaver	David M. Israel	March 11, 2014	7.48
Will looks to Marcus to salvage a guys' night out that he had originally intended to have with Andy; Andy and his domineering wife Laurie begrudgingly ask Will to be the godfather of their children.
4	4	"About a Girl"	Ken Whittingham	Mark Kunerth	March 18, 2014	7.61
Will's advice to Marcus about girls backfires, but Marcus receives an invite to a popular girl's party in the process; Will recruits Fiona and Dakota (Leslie Bibb) to help when they discover he is being shunned at the party..
5	5	"About a Plumber"	Michael Weaver	Sarah Watson	March 25, 2014	7.41
Will pressures Fiona to resume dating when Marcus starts dropping hints that the two should get married; Fiona scores a date with her plumber (Will Sasso), with some forced assistance from Dakota; Will has "The Talk" with an unrelenting Marcus.
6	6	"About a Bublé"	Adam Davidson	Cara DiPaolo	April 1, 2014	7.17
Fiona finally trusts Marcus to be home alone and he receives his own house key, but he accidentally drops a knife on his foot, forcing Will to rush him to the hospital where he meets the attractive Dr. Samantha Lake (Adrianne Palicki), who treats Marcus; Fiona learns of Marcus's accident and endlessly smothers him, forcing Will to set her straight.
7	7	"About a Poker Night"	Adam Davidson	Colleen McGuinness	April 8, 2014	6.87
Will holds a poker night with some of his buddies, but they all have their problems; Fiona crashes the party and befriends Will's poker buddies; Marcus attends his first sleepover, but cannot sit through a horror movie that the other kids are watching.
8	8	"About a Slopmaster"	Jeff Melman	Carrie Kemper	April 15, 2014	6.99
Marcus is disappointed when Fiona assigns him the role of "slopmaster" (garbage-man) in his school's "Mini-Society" project, so he resorts to counterfeiting after advice from Will; Will tries to impress Dr. Sam again.
9	9	"About a Kiss"	Eric Appel	Matt Wolpert & Ben Nedivi	April 22, 2014	6.86
Will reluctantly attends Andy and Laurie's game night, to which he invites Dr. Sam; Fiona drops Marcus off at a neighborhood mom's house, where he befriends a girl who is mistreated by her two popular sisters; Marcus gets his first kiss.
10	10	"About a Boy's Dad"	Wendey Stanzler	Sarah Watson	April 29, 2014	6.25
Marcus's father and Fiona's ex-husband Hugh (Tony Hale) visits from Antarctica, but Will quickly notices how Hugh only cares about his work with penguins; Will teaches Marcus to play baseball and persuades an unreceptive Hugh into bonding with the boy, which fails when Hugh receives an emergency call about one of his penguins; Will tries to have his first sexual encounter with Dr. Sam, but her work schedule complicates matters.
11	11	"About a Birthday Party"	Michael Weaver	David M. Israel	May 6, 2014	6.04
Marcus has an unfortunate history of hosting horrible birthday parties, so he asks Will to help him; Will is invited to a hospital gala by Dr. Sam, but the event is on the same day as Marcus's birthday party.
12	12	"About a Hammer"	Dylan K. Massin	Mark Kunerth	May 13, 2014	6.42
Dr. Sam is evacuated from her apartment and looks to Will for a place to stay; Will and Marcus build a tree fort together; Dr. Sam reveals that she accepted a job in New York City and is moving there, but Fiona mistakenly believes her to be pregnant.
13	13	"About a Rib Chute"	Lawrence Trilling	Jason Katims	May 13, 2014	5.68
Dr. Sam asks Will to move to New York City with her, and after due consideration, Will accepts the offer. When Marcus finds out, he becomes upset and angry and decides to cut all ties with Will. He later realizes his error and decides to attend Will's band's reunion concert as Will and Fiona finish their performance, restoring their friendship. The season ends with Will in New York wrapping up a video chat with Marcus, with whom he promises to stay in contact.

=== Season 2 (2014–15) ===
No. overall	No. in season	Title	Directed by	Written by	Original release date	U.S. viewers (millions)
14	1	"About a Vasectomy"	Adam Davidson	Jason Katims	October 14, 2014	5.83
After a surprising notice regarding his royalty checks, Will returns to San Francisco to sort out his financial troubles, eventually coming to learn from his advisor that somebody is claiming to have co-written Runaway Sleigh; Marcus claims to have made some new friends, but Will discovers they are being less than friendly to the boy.
15	2	"About a House for Sale"	Michael Weaver	David M. Israel	October 21, 2014	4.63
Will wrestles with selling his house to get out of almost-certain financial ruin and decides to help Marcus find a new friend; Fiona tries her hand at home improvement by converting the dumbwaiter.
16	3	"About a Will-O-Ween"	Adam Davidson	Mark Kunerth	October 28, 2014	4.11
Will decides to throw a Halloween party despite his financial situation; Fiona hits it off with a British man dressed as Sherlock Holmes and experiences her first sugar rush; since they are both having a hard time at the party, Will and Marcus decide to break the curse of bad Halloweens.
17	4	"About a Bad Girl"	Michael Weaver	Julia Brownell	November 4, 2014	3.52
Marcus develops a crush on a girl named Shea who is rough around the edges, to the point where he takes the fall for one of her infractions; when Fiona finds out, she bans him from having anything to do with her and expects Will (who recently signed on as Marcus's emergency contact) to uphold the ban, which proves easier said than done. (Broadcast in normal time slot pre-empted in some areas by election return coverage.)
18	5	"About an Angry Ex"	Dylan K. Massin	Annie Weisman	November 18, 2014	4.21
Will discovers that his stalker ex, Stacey (Aimee Garcia), is the one suing him for the Runaway Sleigh royalties, which he discovers Fiona indirectly motivated her to do; Marcus tries to "accidentally" run into Shea, only for her to point out that he is behaving like a stalker (much like Stacey).
19	6	"About a Balcony"	Patrick Norris	Isaac Aptaker & Elizabeth Berger	November 25, 2014	3.05
Will becomes jealous when Marcus starts heaping praise on his new "cool" teacher Mr. Chris (Chris Diamantopoulos), who has an unorthodox way of teaching Shakespeare to the kids; Fiona isn't too fond of Mr. Chris's methods and sets up a meeting to discuss her thoughts on it, only to find herself attracted to him after some prodding from Dakota; Will tries to show up Mr. Chris by building a huge balcony set for the play, which falls apart mid-performance.
20	7	"About a Duck"	Michael Weaver	Hannah Friedman	December 2, 2014	4.21
Fiona and Mr. Chris go on a double-date with Will and Dakota on a hike, with Fiona and Will eventually sabotaging each other's dates; Marcus stays with Andy and Laurie while the adults are out, and inadvertently reveals some information Laurie didn't know, but also helps Andy and Laurie remember how they met and fell in love.
21	8	"About a Christmas Carol"	Dax Shepard	Jason Katims	December 9, 2014	3.68
Scrooge-like Will takes Marcus with him on a search for the handwritten lyrics for Runaway Sleigh to prove that only he wrote that song, leading them to a less-than-warm reunion with Will's father; Fiona tries to restore Marcus's Christmas spirit after Will ruins Santa Claus for him.
22	9	"About a Manniversary"	Jay Karas	Julia Brownell	January 6, 2015	2.69
Will and Marcus celebrate one year of friendship at the Golden Gate Femfest featuring Lisa Loeb, with whom Marcus is obsessed; Fiona tries to take her relationship with Mr. Chris to the next level, and looks to Dakota for advice.
23	10	"About a Boy Becoming a Man"	Bethany Rooney	Annie Weisman	January 13, 2015	2.79
Will and Andy attend a bar mitzvah posing as a gay couple so that Will can give his music to record executive Johnny Idalis; Marcus is left home alone for the first time since accidentally stabbing his foot, but Shea takes him out to crash a party; Fiona struggles with breaking the news of her relationship with Mr. Chris to Marcus, worrying about his reaction.
24	11	"About a Hook"	Linda Mendoza	David M. Israel	January 27, 2015	2.80
Marcus is fed up with Fiona and Mr. Chris's relationship and decides to move in with Will, who finds the boy's 24-hour presence cramping his style; Will and Andy attempt to find inspiration for a new song that Will plans to send to Johnny Idalis.
25	12	"About a Prostitute"	Daisy von Scherler Mayer	Mark Kunerth	February 3, 2015	2.86
Will starts teaching guitar to make money and is paid a huge amount by the mother of one of his students, but Andy believes that Will is being paid for having sex with her; Marcus's class is performing at a fundraiser; Fiona tries to get in good with the popular moms but finds herself sacrificing her family motto, even talking Marcus out of performing a song he wants to perform.
26	13	"About a Cat Party"	Dylan K. Massin	Julia Brownell	February 10, 2015	2.70
On Valentine's Day, Will finds himself alone when even his friend T.J. has a girlfriend, and after a failed attempt to pick up a younger woman, finds himself drawn to the female bartender; Marcus tries to have a Valentine's Day with Shea but because she's not a fan of the holiday, he seeks advice from Will and Mr. Chris.
27	14	"About a Boyfriend"	Ken Whittingham	Isaac Aptaker & Elizabeth Berger	February 17, 2015	2.41
Marcus and Shea finally become a couple, and Will chaperones their date, where he learns some disturbing information about Shea from the popular moms; Marcus attempts to confront Shea's ex-boyfriend; Fiona tries to be adventurous on her next date with Mr. Chris, only to get themselves arrested for skinny dipping.
28	15	"About a Trunk"	Wendey Stanzler	Annie Weisman	July 20, 2015 (US VoD)	N/A
Will is convinced that Chris is cheating on Fiona so he follows Chris to a hotel, where Chris reveals he has accepted a job offer out of the country, while Fiona prepares to tell Chris she loves him. Meanwhile, Marcus is trying to raise enough money to take Shea on a date to the movies so Marcus sells his silence to Andy for $100.
29	16	"About a Memory Hole"	Michael Weaver	Mark Kunerth	July 20, 2015 (US VoD)	N/A
Will's new girlfriend Liz (Christine Woods) wants to hang out all day, the same day that Will volunteers to dig a hole for Fiona to throw all of her memories of Chris into to burn.
30	17	"About a Babymoon"	Dylan K. Massin	Aaron Brownstein & Simon Ganz	July 20, 2015 (US VoD)	N/A
Andy and Laurie vacation apart, Fiona and Laurie have a Spa day staycation in San Francisco, while Will and Andy head to Las Vegas where Andy goes on a drunken spending spree on magic tricks until Laurie shows up to renew her vows with Andy. Meanwhile Marcus tries to read a romance novel to understand adult relationships to impress Shea.
31	18	"About Another Boy"	Michael Weaver	Isaac Aptaker & Elizabeth Berger	July 20, 2015 (US VoD)	N/A
Marcus feels betrayed after Will tries to impress Clay, his girlfriend Liz's son, Meanwhile Fiona is becoming a doula and trying to patch up Andy and Laurie's relationship.
32	19	"About a Self Defense"	Jaffar Mahmood	Annie Weisman	July 20, 2015 (US VoD)	N/A
Clay is trying to steal Shea away from Marcus, Meanwhile Liz feels there may be something strange about the relationship between Will and Fiona.
33	20	"About a Love in the Air"	Patrick Norris	Jason Katims	July 20, 2015 (US VoD)	N/A
Will plays wing-man for Marcus, but Marcus wants to win Shea back at the school dance, Liz dumps Will after he defends Fiona, Marcus professes his love for Shea, Fiona and Will kiss.
