= Pilot (About a Boy) =

- About a Boy episode
- Episode no.: Season 1 Episode 1
- Directed by: Jon Favreau
- Written by: Jason Katims
- Production code: 101
- Original air date: February 22, 2014
- Running time: 22 mins

Guest appearances
- Phil Abrams as Principal Goldenrod; Mackenzie Aladjem as Makala; Leslie Bibb as Dakota; Anjelah Johnson-Reyes as Laurie; Makenzie Moss as Eden

Episode chronology
← Previous —	Next → "About Total Exuberance"

"Pilot" is the pilot and first episode of the American television comedy series About a Boy, which premiered on February 22, 2014, on NBC in the United States. The series is based on the 1998 novel of the same name by British writer Nick Hornby and the 2002 film starring Hugh Grant. The episode is written by series developer Jason Katims and is directed by Jon Favreau. In the episode, a young boy named Marcus (Benjamin Stockham) and his single mother Fiona (Minnie Driver) move in next door to Will (David Walton), an unemployed bachelor living in San Francisco. Will woos a woman by pretending Marcus is his son.

== Plot ==
Will is on a San Francisco trolley with his friend Andy (Al Madrigal) and Andy's two kids. Will gets off to flirt with a woman named Dakota (Leslie Bibb) who is going to a single parents' support group meeting. He lies to her, saying he is a single parent of a son named Jonah who has leukemia. She becomes attracted to him and asks to set up a play date between her daughters and his son.

Will later meets his new neighbors, Fiona and her 11-year-old son Marcus. One afternoon, Fiona is about to meditate in her backyard when a waft of meat smoke from Will's barbecue catches her attention. Fiona becomes displeased and explains to him that she is a vegan. The next day, Marcus is chased home after school by three bullies. Marcus knocks on Will's door and he lets him in. Inside, the two reach an agreement—in exchange for pretending to be Will's son, Marcus wants to meet up with him after school and take part in activities which Fiona expressly disallows, such as watching television and eating ribs. When Dakota comes for a visit, she sees Marcus and assumes he is Will's son. Marcus plays along and whispers to him, "I own you."

Marcus enters the middle school talent show to cheer up his somewhat depressed mother, and he invites Will to dinner where Fiona and Marcus practice his talent show song. A few days later, Dakota and her daughters go to Will's house for a play date. Dakota goes outside to put some steaks on the grill, which results in Fiona coming over to find Marcus calling Will "dad". She accuses Will of using her son to have sex with Dakota, and that Marcus is not his friend, a charge Will does not deny.

On the day of the talent show, Will rushes to the school to discourage Marcus from singing, as Marcus would be subjected to even more bullying. Marcus says he does not care because his singing makes his mother happy. Upon taking the stage, kids in the audience start mocking him and throwing things, so Will joins Marcus on keyboards and backup vocals. The performance receives a standing ovation, and Marcus and Will high-five each other and run off stage.

== Reception ==
=== Critical reception ===
"Pilot" received mixed reviews from critics. Keith Staskiewicz of Entertainment Weekly gave the episode a B+ grade, saying that it captured the "sweetly wry tone" of the Nick Hornby source material and that of the 2002 film. Mark Rozeman Paste stated that the episode "is a loving realized approximation that—if you can manage to approach it as its own beast—works as the sort of sentimental, character-based show that Katims does well." In contrast, Mary McNamara of the Los Angeles Times remarked, "Within two minutes of the pilot's opener, I found myself pining for Hugh Grant, an event that seemed impossible up until the moment it occurred." Similarly, Linda Holmes of NPR criticized the episode, saying it culminated "in a scene that makes so many wrong choices that anyone who adores the film is likely to be specifically enraged by what seems to be an almost complete failure to comprehend what was important about that story and the way it progressed and ended."

Jacqueline Cutler of Zap2it said the pilot "does a great job introducing a callow cad, an odd boy and his strident mom." IGN's Jim McMahon stated, "while it's not a laugh-a-minute riot, this opening episode points the way to what could eventually become a powerhouse comedy." Brian Lowry of Variety described the episode as "an utterly charming pilot, and almost certainly the most endearing half-hour NBC has developed in some time."

=== Ratings ===
The pilot episode, which followed primetime coverage of the 2014 Winter Olympics, was watched by 8.26 million viewers and received a 2.2 rating in the 18-49 demographic.
