= 1600 Penn =

American television sitcom (2012–2013)

- Genre: Sitcom
- Created by: Josh Gad; Jon Lovett; Jason Winer
- Starring: Josh Gad; Jenna Elfman; Martha MacIsaac; André Holland; Amara Miller; Benjamin Stockham; Bill Pullman
- Composers: Erica Weis; Brandon Williams
- Country of origin: United States
- Original language: English
- No. of seasons: 1
- No. of episodes: 13

Production
- Executive producers: Josh Gad; Jon Lovett; Jason Winer; Mike Royce
- Camera setup: Single-camera
- Running time: 22 minutes
- Production companies: Angry Child Productions; Snowpants Productions (episodes 2–13); Small Dog Picture Company; 20th Century Fox Television

Original release
- Network: NBC
- Release: December 17, 2012 – March 28, 2013

1600 Penn is an American television sitcom about a dysfunctional family living in the White House. The series stars Jenna Elfman, Bill Pullman, and Josh Gad. Gad, along with Jason Winer and Jon Lovett jointly created the central characters (the Gilchrist family). NBC placed a series order in May 2012. The series aired as a mid-season replacement from December 17, 2012, to March 28, 2013. The series has mixed reviews. On May 9, 2013, NBC canceled the series after one season.

== Characters ==
- Standrich "Skip" Gilchrist Jr. (Josh Gad) is the eldest son of the President of the United States.
- Emily Nash-Gilchrist (Jenna Elfman) is the President's second wife and former campaign manager.
- Becca Gilchrist (Martha MacIsaac) is the President's eldest daughter.
- Marshall Malloy (André Holland) is the White House Press Secretary.
- Marigold Gilchrist (Amara Miller) is the President's younger daughter.
- Xander Gilchrist (Benjamin Stockham) is the President's younger son.
- Standrich Dale Gilchrist (Bill Pullman) is the President. A widower, he is a former United States Marine, Congressman, and Governor of Nevada.

Recurring character D.B. (Robbie Amell) is the presumed father to Becca's baby.

== Production ==
A promotional image for 1600 Penn

=== Development ===
1600 Penn was given a series order on May 7, 2012. The series aired on NBC from December 17, 2012, to March 28, 2013. On May 9, 2013, 1600 Penn was canceled after one season.

=== Casting ===
Brittany Snow had originally been cast as the eldest daughter Becca, but was replaced by MacIsaac. This was the second time Bill Pullman has played an American president, the first having been in the film Independence Day.

== Reception ==
1600 Penn received mixed reviews from critics. Rotten Tomatoes gives the series a rating of 43%, based on 35 reviews, with the site's critical consensus reading, "Broad but likeable, 1600 Penn unfortunately doles out its jokes unevenly and lacks the cutting wit necessary to meet its satirical aims." On Metacritic, the series has a score of 55 out of 100, based on 36 critics, indicating "mixed or average reviews".

David Hinkley of the New York Daily News gave the series 1 out of 5 stars and said "[it] was clearly designed to be good silly fun. It nails one out of three. It's silly." He called the First Family "annoying... sitcom stereotypes" and said that it "mines none of the more subtle and satisfying possibilities of poking fun at a staid institution. It's more like a drug-fueled Saturday Night Live sketch that won't end. Fortunately, 1600 Penn probably will." Tim Surette of TV.com said that the show was "what happens when network executives think a screeching buffoon equals laughs" and that the jokes elicit responses of "mostly tumbleweeds and cricket chirps". Paste's Ross Bonaime also criticized the characters and said, "please, oh please, make the show actually funny... maybe it should just be put out of its misery." Vicki Hyman of The Star-Ledger graded the show a "D" and said, "you'd be forgiven for thinking [it] was a relic of the 1980s or 1990s", adding that the show was looking for "viewers who have lax requirements about actual humor in their comedies." Paul Meekin of Star Pulse noted that the show was unable to escape the footprint of The West Wing and wondered if it was "a years-late West Wing parody, a humorous and fresh take on presidential politics, or somewhere in between?" answering, "it's neither. It's actually quite godawful."

One less critical review came from Hank Stuever of The Washington Post, who called it "formulaic" but said, "give a few points to 1600 Penn for trying." He also noted that "there's no danger of a partisan storyline or any resemblance to the current administration." Maureen Ryan of The Huffington Post called Josh Gad "by far the best thing about this show" and hoped that if the show were cancelled, he find a better vehicle for his talents.

== Episodes ==
No.	Title	Directed by	Written by	Original release date	Prod. code	US viewers (millions)
1	"Pilot: Putting Out Fires"	Jason Winer	Story by : Josh Gad & Jon Lovett & Jason Winer; Teleplay by : Jon Lovett	December 17, 2012	1AVZ79	6.88
After a fire, Skip Gilchrist (Josh Gad) returns from college to live with his parents and the rest of his family (Jenna Elfman, Andre Holland, Amara Miller, Benjamin Stockham, and Bill Pullman) in the White House. Rebecca "Becca" Gilchrist (Martha MacIsaac), the President's oldest child, frantically checking the results of an at-home pregnancy test, discovers that it is positive, and that she is now pregnant. Around the same time, Skip's and Becca's father, the President, is working on a trade agreement.
2	"The Skiplantic Ocean"	Jason Winer	Mike Royce	January 10, 2013	1AVZ01	3.86
Word gets out that Becca is pregnant after a conversation between Emily and Becca goes viral. Skip convinces Becca to just relax and not be so stressed, but when Skip accidentally leaks the details of the one night stand, it causes Becca to become even more stressed. Dale realizes he cannot punish Becca for the accident and begins to support her in every way possible.
3	"So You Don't Want to Dance"	Jason Winer	Joe Port & Joe Wiseman	January 17, 2013	1AVZ02	3.04
Hoping to gain votes for new educational reforms, President Gilchrist hosts a ball for an ill-tempered senator and his wife. Elsewhere, Skip wants to invite an attractive mail-room clerk to the gala; and Becca reveals a hidden past.
4	"Meet the Parent"	Jason Winer	Peter A. Knight	January 24, 2013	1AVZ04	3.28
President Gilchrist uses his influence to locate an important person. Meanwhile, Emily finds herself in hot water after she throws protocol to the wind during a visit from the Austrian chancellor and his wife; and Skip finds his true calling.
5	"Frosting Nixon"	Jennifer Getzinger	Sanjay Shah	February 7, 2013	1AVZ03	2.60
Skip attempts to placate a group of protesters who are upset about his dad's transportation policies, but his efforts only make things worse. Elsewhere, Emily helps Xander with his campaign for student-body president; and Becca struggles to come to grips with her future.
6	"Skip the Tour"	Jason Winer	Laura Gutin Peterson	February 21, 2013	1AVZ06	2.34
Skip thinks the White House tour is too boring and is not showing the White House as the wonderful place he thinks it is, so he hijacks a tour group and starts his own.
7	"To the Ranch"	Ken Whittingham	Bridget Bedard	February 28, 2013	1AVZ05	2.20
Unable to decide on whom to appoint to the empty seat on the Supreme Court, President Gilchrist decides to take an untimely family trip to his ranch to clear his head and avoid choosing. Skip is heart broken when he finds out his crush Stacy has a boyfriend. Emily thinks Xander and Marigold are too engrossed in technology, so she kidnaps their phones and has them go on a cross country hike to retrieve them, so they may learn to appreciate the beauty of nature. Yet her plan ends up backfiring against her. Becca is having trouble listening to D.B.'s less than intellectually stimulating conversations.
8	"Live from the Lincoln Bedroom"	Jason Winer	Ryan Raddatz	March 7, 2013	1AVZ08	2.10
Skip starts his own Podcast, which is potentially a ticking publicity time bomb that Marshall must put a stop to. Becca and Emily once again go head-to-head over mothering responsibilities when Marigold decides to take photography instead of honors algebra.
9	"Game Theory"	Jason Winer	Dan Hernandez & Benji Samit	March 14, 2013	1AVZ07	2.23
Skip finally asks out Stacy, and Emily offers her help to try and stop Skip from inevitably and horribly embarrassing himself.
10	"The Short Happy Life of Reba Cadbury"	David Grossman	Joe Port & Joe Wiseman	March 21, 2013	1AVZ11	2.49
Emily does what she can to help Skip graduate college. Becca comes up with a way to be noticed at a committee meeting. Marshall tries anything for a few moments of solitude.
11	"Dinner, Bath, Puzzle"	Gail Mancuso	Jon Lovett & Sanjay Shah	March 21, 2013	1AVZ09	2.32
The Gilchrists meet with the French president and first lady, then wish to create a spark in their own marriage by going on a date. Skip is left to tend to the children. D.B. and Marshall bond.
12	"Bursting the Bubble"	Jason Winer	Peter A. Knight & Laura Gutin-Peterson	March 28, 2013	1AVZ10	1.92
After being requested, Skip is roped into escorting the Princess of Andorra to a gala but gets himself into too much trouble.
13	"Marry Me, Baby"	Jason Winer	Jon Lovett & Mike Royce	March 28, 2013	1AVZ12	1.91
The President makes controversial remarks about marriage causing the public to question if the First Couple are really married. They plan to remarry in a big ceremony where unexpected events occur. Becca goes into labor and gives birth to her and Marshall's baby.

== Home media ==
On April 7, 2015, 20th Century Fox Home Entertainment released 1600 Penn - The Complete Series on DVD in Region 1.
