= Justin Kelly (actor) =

Canadian actor (born 1992)

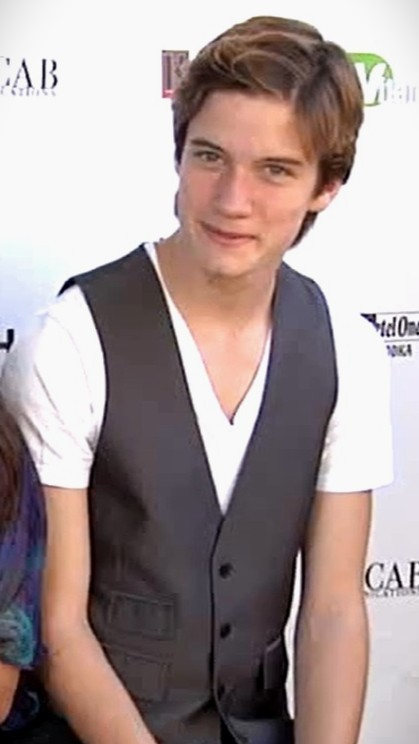
- Kelly in 2011
- Born: March 7, 1992 (age 34); Toronto, Ontario, Canada
- Occupation: Actor
- Years active: 2007–present
- Spouse: Kathryn Fantaske (m. 2021)
- Children: 1

Signature
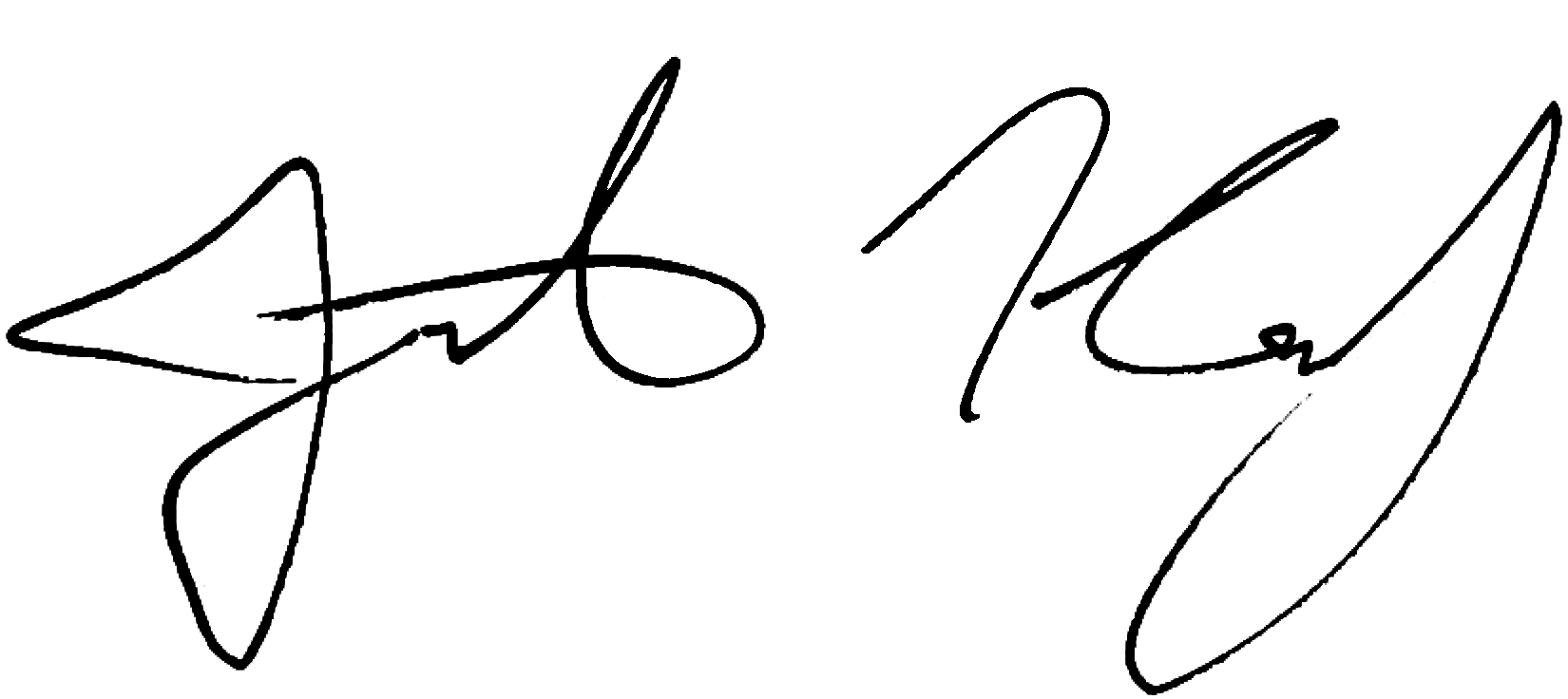

Justin Kelly (born March 7, 1992) is a Canadian actor, best known for his roles as Noah Jackson on the Family channel original series The Latest Buzz and as Jake Martin in Degrassi. Since 2019, Kelly has played the role of Jesse Mills on Hudson & Rex.

== Career ==
In 2014, Kelly appeared in David Cronenberg's Maps to the Stars. He appeared as Wes in Open Heart, Chuck in Between, and Robin in Wynonna Earp.

In 2019, Kelly began appearing on the Canadian series Hudson & Rex as Jesse Mills, an IT specialist for the St. John's Police Department. Kelly has played Jesse for four seasons as of early 2022. "I get to really play with these quirks and explore the nerdy comedic side of him, because he's the youngest one on the team. He's the millennial. He makes the jokes that the older folks don’t quite understand. That's something that I just always latched onto and always really enjoyed." After a successful season 4 and season 5, the show was renewed for season 6 in April 2023.

== Personal life ==
Justin Kelly has been engaged to Kathryn Fantaske since December 2018. They got married in December 2021. He attended Earl Haig Secondary School.

== Filmography ==
=== Film ===
Year	Film	Role	Notes
2012	The Subterfuge Suite	Jack	Short film
2014	Maps to the Stars	Rhett	
2014	Big Muddy	Andy Barlow	
2014	Ahead	Colin	Short film
2014	Lost After Dark	Sean	
2016	Lost & Found	Andy Walton	
2018	The Last Man	Johnny	
2019	Run This Town	Neil	

=== Television ===
Year	Film	Role	Notes
2007–2010	The Latest Buzz	Noah Jackson	Main (Seasons 1–3)
2008	For The Love Of Grace	Teenage Boy	Television film
2010	The Jensen Project	Brody Thompson	Television film
2011	Change of Plans	Noah Roorda	Television film
2011–2013	Degrassi	Jake Martin	Main (Seasons 11–12)
2012	Warehouse 13	Brady Miller	Episode: "There's Always a Downside"
2013	Lost Girl	Nelson	Episode: "Delinquents"
2013	Saving Hope	Riley Stiles	Episode: "Vamonos"
2015	Pirate's Passage	Carl/Lookout (voice)	Television film
2015	Open Heart	Wesley "Wes" Silver	Main (season 1)
2015–2016	Between	Chuck Lott Jr.	Main (Seasons 1–2)
2016	The Night Before Halloween	Adam	Television film
2017	Sea Change	Bobby	Television film
2017	Fugazi	Charlie Byron	Television film
2017	Bad Date Chronicles	Conner	Television film
2018	Frankie Drake Mysteries	Foster Hewitt	Episode: "Radio Daze"
2018	Private Eyes	Dylan Mallone	Episode: "Brew the Right Thing"
2018	Wynonna Earp	Robin	Recurring (season 3); 6 episodes
2019–present	Hudson & Rex	Jesse Mills	Main role

== Filmmaking credits ==
Year	Title	Writer	Producer	Notes
2012	The Martini Shot	Yes	No	Short film
2012	The Subterfuge Suite	Yes	Yes	Short film
2013	Hashtag Hypochondriac	Yes	No	Short film
2013	Let Me Out	Yes	Yes	Short film
2014	Ahead	Yes	No	Short film
2014	Doc	Yes	No	Short film
