= Mockingbird (film) =

2014 film by Bryan Bertino

- Mockingbird poster
- Directed by: Bryan Bertino
- Screenplay by: Bryan Bertino
- Story by: Bryan Bertino; Sam Esmail
- Produced by: Jason Blum; Marc Platt; Adam Siegel; Bryan Bertino; Adrienne Biddle
- Starring: Todd Stashwick; Alexandra Lydon; Barak Hardley; Audrey Marie Anderson; Natalie Alyn Lind; Benjamin Stockham
- Cinematography: Brandon Cox
- Edited by: Maria Gonzales
- Production companies: Blumhouse Productions; Marc Platt Productions
- Distributed by: Universal Pictures
- Release date: October 7, 2014
- Running time: 81 minutes
- Country: United States
- Language: English

Mockingbird is a 2014 American found footage horror film written and directed by Bryan Bertino, from a story by Bertino and Sam Esmail. The movie was released to video on demand on October 7, 2014, and was given a DVD and Blu-ray release on October 21 of the same year. It features Todd Stashwick, Alexandra Lydon, and Barak Hardley as three people that have been given video cameras with the instructions to film their daily activities for a strange contest.

== Plot ==
The movie follows three groups of people, all of whom have found a video camera on their doorstep and begin filming with the impression that this is a chance to win money as part of a mysterious competition. Tom (Todd Stashwick) is an average guy filming the life of his family with his wife Emmy. Beth (Alexandra Lydon) is a bored and isolated college girl who sees the camera as something to fill her free time. Leonard (Barak Hardley) is a mother's boy who believes his clown makeup will steal the scene. Each group has been given a label - "The Family" (Tom & Emmy), "The Woman" (Beth), and "The Clown" (Leonard), but they are largely unaware of what is truly happening and are shocked when they receive instructions telling them to keep filming or die.

== Cast ==
- Todd Stashwick as Tom
- Audrey Marie Anderson as Emmy
- Barak Hardley as Leonard
- Alexandra Lydon as Beth
- Emily Alyn Lind as Abby
- Alyvia Alyn Lind as Megan
- Lee Garlington as Leonard's mother
- Spencer List as Jacob Henry
- Natalie Alyn Lind as Jacob's Friend #4
- Benjamin Stockham as Jacob's Friend #2
- Isabella Murad as Jacob's Friend #3

== Reception ==
Bloody Disgusting and Indiewire both gave favorable reviews for Mockingbird, and Bloody Disgusting praised the movie for its tone and wrote that while it "lacks some of the studio polish of The Strangers, it actually feels bigger than that film in some regards." HorrorNews.net panned the film.
