= Lost & Found (2016 American film) =

2016 Canadian-American mystery adventure film

- Film poster
- Directed by: Joseph Itaya
- Written by: Joseph Itaya; Erik Cardona
- Produced by: Jordan Barker; Scott Bridges; Borga Dorter; Joseph Itaya; Kim Selby
- Starring: Justin Kelly; Benjamin Stockham; Cary Elwes; Jason Patric
- Cinematography: Matt Egan
- Edited by: Brian Felber
- Music by: Tom Howe
- Production companies: Sure Crossing Films; Enlighten Entertainment Group; Gearshift Films
- Distributed by: Sony Pictures Home Entertainment
- Release dates: February 2016 (Sedona); January 6, 2017
- Running time: 90 minutes
- Countries: United States; Canada
- Language: English

Lost & Found is a 2016 mystery adventure film directed by Joseph Itaya and starring Justin Kelly, Benjamin Stockham, Cary Elwes and Jason Patric.

== Plot summary ==
The film starts off showing Walton island which is owned by World War 2 veteran, Alexander Walton. He goes missing one day, and the island is taken away from his family.

Andy Walton is a school student who excels at swimming. He has a smarter younger brother named Mark, who suffers from a serious ear condition. His scholarship dreams are shattered when he loses a swimming contest. He gets caught stealing drinks from a store, after being left behind by his so called friends. His parents decide to send him and Mark to their paternal uncle Trent, whom the kids have never heard of before. Andy finds a pocket watch and takes it with him.

Uncle Trent takes them to the island which once belonged to the Waltons. There is a West Forest, said to be haunted due to the death of 9 people. Andy meets his friend Claire whom he likes. Mark and Andy learn of the treasure that their grandfather left on the island for his family. Andy appears keen about it. One day, he is invited for dinner by Claire's father and the island's new owner, John Broman. He learns that Trent lost their house to John in a poker game, which enrages him. He almost gets shot by someone in the West Forest. Trent forbids both Andy and Mark from going there again. They find another pocket watch with Trent. Both the watches have a message from Alexander, which Andy believes to be clues to the treasure.

He and Mark decide to crack it. They go to the beach at midnight, after Andy fights with a drunk Trent. Next day, Claire confesses that she likes Andy and they kiss. He gifts her a necklace and she in turn gives a chain with a key to Mark. Mark sees a lighthouse and informs Andy that he has cracked one of the clues. They search it and find another clue which lands them up in Bromans' house, where Alexander's possessions are stored. Claire helps them to get the key, pretending in front of her father. John is revealed to be behind the 9 people's death. Andy and Mark enter a secret room. They find a key and a device. When they go back home, they encounter drunk Trent. Andy finds out that Trent is his father and furiously leaves the house, leaving Mark behind. Trent calls for his brother Jim and they set out to search for Andy.

Andy goes into the West Forest and discovers an underground passage, but the opening closes behind him, locking him inside. Mark finds him with the help of a walkie-talkie. They unlock a door with Claire's key chain, which leads them to a gold mine. John follows them and points a gun at them. He also indicates that he was behind their grandfather's death, but claims it cannot be proven in court. The mine leads to an opening quite a ways above the sea, which is full of currents. The same opening closes behind the three of them, but can only be opened by Mark's compass (which Trent gave him earlier). John pushes Mark into the sea. But Trent grabs Mark and they both fall into the sea. Jim and Trent pull them onto their boat, while John dies. Claire leaves the island, while Trent and Andy and the others, the island apparently restored to them, reconcile.

== Cast ==
- Justin Kelly as Andrew "Andy" Walton
- Benjamin Stockham as Mark Walton
- Celeste Desjardins as Claire Broman
- Jason Patric as Trent Walton
- Cary Elwes as John Broman
- Greg Bryk as Jim Walton
- Kim Selby as Sally Walton
- Matt Connors as Ridgewick
- Robert B. Kennedy as Ridgewick
- Catherine McNally as Esther
