= Big Muddy (film) =

- Film poster
- Directed by: Jefferson Moneo
- Written by: Jefferson Moneo
- Starring: Nadia Litz; Justin Kelly; David La Haye; Rossif Sutherland; Holly Deveaux; Rob van Meenen; Stephen McHattie; James Le Gros
- Release date: 2014
- Running time: 104 minutes
- Country: Canada
- Language: English

Big Muddy is a 2014 Canadian neo-western crime drama directed by Jefferson Moneo, set in Saskatchewan. The film follows Martha (Nadia Litz) and her son Andy (Justin Kelly), as they seek sanctuary at her childhood home on a ranch, owned by Stan (Stephen McHattie), pursued both by Andy's father—himself a fugitive—and one of Martha's criminal associates.

Big Muddy was based on a short student film that Moneo had directed at Columbia University and presented at the Cinéfondation section of the 2011 Cannes Film Festival. While the short film, which was written by classmate Brian Paccione, had been set in New York City, Moneo opted to set his feature adaptation in his home province. It was shot in 20 days in 2013, both Saskatoon in the Assiniboia region in southern Saskatchewan, and mixes elements of film noir with those of classic westerns.

== Cast ==
- Nadia Litz as Martha Barlow
- Justin Kelly as Andy Barlow
- David La Haye as Donovan Fournier
- Stephen McHattie as Stan Barlow
- James Le Gros as Buford Carver
- Rossif Sutherland as Tommy Valente
- Holly Deveaux as June Baker
- Rob van Meenen as Bill Wilson
