= Alexandra Lydon =

American actress and writer (born 1979)

- Born: Alexandra Martin Lydon; April 5, 1979 (age 47); Boston, Massachusetts, US
- Education: New York University
- Occupations: Actress; writer; producer
- Years active: 2003–2019

Alexandra Martin Lydon (born April 5, 1979) is an American actress and writer.

== Early life and education ==
Lydon was born and raised in the Dorchester neighborhood of Boston, Massachusetts. She attended the New York University Tisch School of the Arts where she studied at the affiliated Stella Adler Conservatory, graduating with honors with a double degree in Drama and Psychology.

== Career ==
Lydon played Jane Saunders, daughter of primary villain Stephen Saunders, in the third season of the television series 24 and Ann Owens in Prison Break. She starred in the independent film Nail Polish and Bryan Bertino’s film Mockingbird, released by Universal Studios. She had recurring roles on CSI: Miami and K-Ville and made guest star appearances on shows including CSI: Crime Scene Investigation, Desperate Housewives, House, Private Practice, NCIS and Star Trek: Enterprise. Lydon co-created and performed in the comedy show Worst Laid Plans at the Upright Citizens Brigade Theatre in Los Angeles and New York City. She wrote and performed in the comedy album Worst Laid Plans at the Upright Citizens Brigade Theatre, published by Random House in May 2010. She later adapted the show into a book, Worst Laid Plans: When Bad Sex Happens to Good People, published in 2014 by Abrams Image.

Lydon is also a voice-over artist and has narrated and contributed to documentary television films, including The Young and the Restless in China, part of the PBS documentary series FRONTLINE.

Lydon created and produced the 2015 ABC TV movie Broad Squad. As of 2016, she was writing a book about race and gender dynamics in policing for a six-figure preempt by Picador imprint of Macmillan Publishers. In 2019, her book The Broad Squad was published by Picador.

== Filmography ==
Film
Year	Title	Role	Notes
2004	Bodies	Michele	Short film
2005	Ten Souls Rising	Sarah	Short film
2006	Nail Polish	Allison Silverman	
2014	Mockingbird	Beth	Found footage film

Television
Year	Title	Role	Notes
2003	Hack	Julie Reed	Episode: "All Others Pay Cash"; as Alexander Lydon
2003	Ed	Riley	Episode: "Just a Formality"
2004	24	Jane Saunders	5 episodes
2005	Star Trek: Enterprise	Jhamel	Episode: "The Aenar"
2005	Without a Trace	Agnes Deschamps	Episode: "Second Sight"
2005	CSI: Crime Scene Investigation	Susan Hemmington	Episode: "Iced"
2005	Desperate Housewives	Rita Rivara	Episode: "You Could Drive a Person Crazy"
2005–06	CSI: Miami	Jennifer Wilson	3 episodes
2006	Prison Break	Ann Owens	3 episodes
2007	NCIS	Natalie Dalton	Episode: "Skeletons"
2007	K-Ville	Sam Winston	3 episodes
2008	Eli Stone	Cori Mitchell	Episode: "One More Try"
2008	Cold Case	Miriam Forrester	Episode: "Wednesday's Women"
2008	The Oaks	Helen	Episode: Pilot
2008	House	Melinda	Episode: "Emancipation"
2008	The Young and the Restless in China	Narrator	Part of the PBS documentary series FRONTLINE
2009	Private Practice	Eleanor	Episode: "Wait and See"
2009	Single Dads	Beth	Episodes: "Meeting Girls in the Park", "Having Girls Over"
2010	In Plain Sight	Natalie Vickers	Episode: "Love's Faber Lost"
2011	Lie to Me	Claire Hanson	Episode: "Killer App"
2011	Borderline Murder	Halie Morgan	Television movie
2013	Vegas	Shelly Everson	Episode: "The Third Man"
2015	Broad Squad	Creator and producer	Television movie

Theater
Year	Title	Role	Notes
2016	Make Sure It's Me	Sandra	Williamstown Theatre Festival, Berkshires, MA
2016	Berkshire Theatre Festival	Various parts	Berkshires, MA
2018	Rickshaw	Caroline (Lead)	Boston, MA
2019	War Stories	Lead	Stella Adler Theatre

== Publications ==
- Lydon, Alexandra; Kindred, Laura (2010). Worst Laid Plans at the Upright Citizens Brigade Theatre. Random House. ASIN B003KQMG5S. ISBN 9780307714824.
- Lydon, Alexandra (2014). Worst Laid Plans: When Bad Sex Happens to Good People. Abrams Image. ISBN 9781613128121. ISBN 1613128126.
- Lydon, Alexandra (2019). The Broad Squad. Picador. ASIN B0DN2VFQY4.
