= A Great or Little Thing =

- The Penguin episode
- Episode no.: Episode 8
- Directed by: Jennifer Getzinger
- Written by: Lauren LeFranc
- Cinematography by: Zoë White
- Editing by: Henk Van Eeghen
- Original air date: November 10, 2024
- Running time: 68 minutes

Guest appearances
- Emily Meade as Young Francis Cobb; François Chau as Feng Zhao; Rhys Coiro as Councilman Sebastian Hady

Episode chronology
← Previous "Top Hat"	Next → —

"A Great or Little Thing" is the eighth episode and series finale of the American crime drama television miniseries The Penguin, a spin-off from the film The Batman. The episode was written by series developer Lauren LeFranc, and directed by Jennifer Getzinger. It was first broadcast on HBO in the United States on November 10, 2024, and also was available on Max on the same date.

Set shortly after the events of the film, the series explores the rise to power of Oswald "Oz" Cobb / Penguin (portrayed by Colin Farrell) in Gotham City's criminal underworld. Oz finds himself allied with a young man named Victor (Rhenzy Feliz), while also having to deal with the presence of Sofia Falcone (Cristin Milioti), who wants answers regarding her brother's disappearance. In the episode, Oz faces Sofia in a final showdown, while she also forces Francis (Deirdre O'Connell) to confront her son for their past.

According to Nielsen Media Research, the episode was seen by an estimated 0.464 million household viewers and gained a 0.10 ratings share among adults aged 18–49. The episode received highly positive reviews from critics, who praised its closure, performances, tone and production values.

== Plot ==
Dr. Rush gets Francis to reminisce over her past with the use of EMDR. In a flashback, Francis is visited by Rex Calabrese, who offers to pay for the funeral for Jack and Benny. Rex brings up her sidelining Oz, but Francis reveals that she found out he locked Jack and Benny in the sewer tunnel, leading to their deaths. Rex suggests she use Oz's love for her own benefit, feeling she will be rewarded for it. However, Francis is not sure she can do it and asks for Rex's help. She takes Oz to Monroe's, where Oz promises to take care for her if she continues believing in him.

In the present day, Victor takes the heads of other gangs to the base of operation but is shocked to find it destroyed. The leaders decide to leave despite Victor's pleas to fight back. A bound and gagged Oz is taken to the Monroe's nightclub, where Sofia brings a bound Francis as well. She uses a tale to explain how Francis knew about Oz killing his siblings, revealing that she initially conspired with Rex to try and kill Oz. She then has Dr. Rush prepare to cut one of Francis' fingers, telling Oz that he must confess to his role in his brothers' deaths. Oz maintains his innocence, prompting a desperate Francis to reveal that she always knew. Sofia releases her, and Francis expresses her hatred for Oz, regretting to be his mother. She breaks a bottle and stabs him in the stomach but falls unconscious during another dementia episode upon seeing visions of her sons. Oz releases himself and kills Sofia's henchmen, including Detective Marcus Wise, and escapes in a car to take Francis to the hospital.

Sofia meets with the heads of the gangs, offering her criminal empire to whoever captures Oz, preparing to leave Gotham for good. After treating his wound and meeting with Victor, Oz goes to city hall to talk with Councilman Sebastian Hady. He exposes Sofia's actions, claiming that the base of operations belonged to Maroni. He paints the Maronis as killing Alberto, that Sofia retaliated by killing Sal's wife and son, and orchestrated the explosion in Crown Point. Oz offers to give Hady full credit for restoring peace to Crown Point and ending the gang war in exchange for access to and influence over the council. Hady reveals that Mayor Reál is investigating Falcone's associates, which includes Oz himself. While Oz is there, Victor receives a call from Link, Zhao's deputy. As Oz leaves, he is ambushed by Zhao's gang and forced to accompany them.

After burning her belongings and her father's mansion, Sofia meets with Zhao's gang in the airport to face Oz. Suddenly, Link and Zhao's gang turn against him and kill Zhao and her henchmen and release Oz, who forces her to take a ride in the car with him. While doing so, the other gang leaders across Gotham are killed by their deputies. He takes her to the docks, where she continues mocking his mother. Accepting her fate, she turns around as Oz loads a gun. However, she is surprised when helicopters and police cruisers arrive, arresting her. Oz visits Francis at the hospital and is devastated to learn that she had a stroke, leaving her in a vegetative state. Oz refuses to accept this and pleads for his mother to claim that she is proud of him.

Later on, Oz thanks Victor for helping him, lamenting that he saw him during his worst time. Victor confides that they are like family. Oz reacts to this by strangling Victor to death, claiming that family makes him weak. After stealing Victor's money to make it look like a robbery, Oz drops his driver's license in a nearby river and walks off. In Arkham Asylum, Dr. Rush visits Sofia in her cell. He hands her a letter from Selina Kyle, who claims to be her half-sister. Having bought a new car, Oz takes a bedridden Francis to a penthouse suite overlooking the city skyline, stating that he has finally fulfilled his promise to her; a single tear rolls down her eye. He leaves her to join Eve in a dance, who roleplays as his mother, telling him nothing can stop him now. Outside, the Bat-Signal shines in the distance.

== Production ==
=== Development ===
The episode was written by series developer Lauren LeFranc and directed by Jennifer Getzinger. It marked LeFranc's second writing credit, and Getzinger's first directing credit. The episode's title is derived from a line in Oscar Wilde's poem The Ballad of Reading Gaol (1898) after Farrell had given a copy to LeFranc. In the poem, Wilde writes about a man who "kills the thing he loves".

=== Writing ===
When questioned over the flashback sequences, Lauren LeFranc explained, "He previously told Sofia a story about how his mom didn't get out of bed for weeks after his brothers died. He feels like he's lost his mother, in a way. He can feel she's detached, and he has to win back her attention and assure her it's okay. That it's actually it's better now. It's easier because she won't have to feed as many mouths".

Commenting on Victor's death, LeFranc explained that it never had to do with Victor doing anything wrong, but "Oz, in that moment, really chose to kill his own heart and embrace the monster that he is". Colin Farrell explained that the scene should have a feeling where "there was a sense of creative responsibility that leaned towards, “We cannot have this man as a likable character”". Farrell also expressed, "I fucking hated it. I hated that scene. I really did. I was fucking so pissed off. It felt in performing it as — guess what? — you would like it to feel in viewing it. It felt gross, it felt cruel, it felt absolutely insane, and it felt like Oz was reaching a point of no return". He added, "He doesn't even know that he doesn't want to be human, but he's basically saying, 'I don't want to be human.'" Rhenzy Feliz was informed since the beginning of his character's fate, deeming it "an emotional thing that you can give to an audience. It's that shock factor of, “Wow, my goodness”. You keep people excited and keep people on their toes. Nobody's safe, which is exciting too".

Regarding Sofia's ending, LeFranc explained, "With Sofia, I do view her as the closest thing we have to a hero on our show, even though, of course, she's not. It was really important for me that we align ourselves with Sofia as well, because otherwise I think everyone would be cheering by the end for Oz. And I wanted it to hurt in a way, his rise". She also added that by having Oz send her back to Arkham Asylum, "he chose a fate for her that’s worse than death." While LeFranc did not disclose the content of the letter, she said that it would give Sofia "a sense of hope".

The final scene shows the Bat-Signal in the sky. LeFranc said, "We were searching for an elegant way to hand off our show to The Batman. It felt correct to have the Bat-Signal to undercut him and say, ‘You have not made it to the top yet. You are living in this fantasy, but there's a real larger world out there.’" Matt Reeves added, "We're kind of flicking you at the end to say the story's not over. The idea that Oz and these characters could be on a collision course at some point with Batman, that's of course out there. So we wanted to leave you with a sense of that without overshadowing that this is really the completion of the story".

=== Filming ===
The final scene that was filmed for the series was the death of Victor, which Farrell describing as having a "dark energy". The scene was shot in the early morning at the Roosevelt Island, New York City. Farrell asked Feliz if he was prepared for filming the scene a week prior to shooting to ensure Feliz was feeling alright. Meanwhile, O'Connell had been thinking about how she would execute the last page in the episode's script throughout the 2023 SAG-AFTRA strike, which had been to shed a single tear during Francis Cobb's vegetative state. However, Farrell's portrayal as Oz in that scene made him deliberately withdraw his love, which O'Connell described as an influence on her subsequent performance in the scene.

== Reception ==
=== Viewers ===
In its original American broadcast, "A Great or Little Thing" was seen by an estimated 0.464 million household viewers with a 0.10 in the 18–49 demographics. This means that 0.10 percent of all households with televisions watched the episode. This was a 20% increase in viewership from the previous episode, which was seen by an estimated 0.384 million household viewers with a 0.07 in the 18–49 demographics.

=== Critical reviews ===
"A Great or Little Thing" received highly positive reviews from critics. The review aggregator website Rotten Tomatoes reported a 100% approval rating for the episode, with an average rating of 8.9/10 and based on 11 critic's reviews.

Tyler Robertson of IGN gave the episode a "good" 7 out of 10 and wrote in his verdict, "Though not “satisfying” in the traditional sense, and in actuality a really dreadful ending, “Great or Little Thing” is a messy episode of television that doesn't always live up to the highs found elsewhere in The Penguin. At least it culminates in a way that says, with its full chest, that Oswald Cobb is a monster – one who'll require an equal and opposite good to take him down."

William Hughes of The A.V. Club gave the episode an "A–" grade and wrote, "We don't get Eve's perspective on this latest weird and humiliating gig in what's presumably been a long line of them, outside a few pained expressions over Oz's shoulder. But the honest, awful truth is that we don't need to: Oswald Cobb is the king of Gotham now, and that means what he says — and believes — is true. God help us all... at least, as a flickering spotlight in the sky reminds us, until The Batman 2."

Andy Andersen of Vulture gave the episode a 4 star rating out of 5 and wrote, "The Penguin's gamble on telling a Gotham story sans Batman has paid off in dividends, materializing into one of the best shows of the year and a comic-book origin story that speaks to the times without losing sight of the source material's heightened reality. Oz is the Penguin now — like everyone in Batman's Rogues Gallery, a caricature of his own trauma, drawn to criminal means of false liberation."

Josh Rosenberg of Esquire wrote, "It's sad, because I've come to like Oz Cobb far more than Bruce Wayne. I might've even rooted for the villain. No disrespect to Battinson, but I really wanted to see Oz win this one. If you felt the same, the finale will change your mind completely." Joe George of Den of Geek gave the episode a 4 star rating out of 5 and wrote, "To the credit of LeFranc and her collaborators, The Penguin proved itself much more. The world didn't need another show about a sad-sack, one dimensional Batman villain, but it did need a show about a woman vying for power that could never be hers. In the end, I'm grateful that The Penguin became that show, even if it had to push the Penguin out of the nest to do it."

Sean T. Collins of Decider wrote, "the best way to look at The Penguin isn’t as a bridge between movies, but as a shaggy-dog joke. The Penguin does all this, kills all these people, leaves almost every enemy and ally he has in the world dead, so he can run Gotham City... until they switch on the Bat-signal. If that final shot had been accompanied by an actual rimshot, I think I'd have enjoyed it more, not less. Think you can get away with, pal? The joke's on you." Nate Richard of Collider gave the episode a 9 out of 10 rating and wrote, "The Penguin has done a phenomenal job of fleshing out its ensemble, particularly Sofia, Vic, and Francis. But this finale takes things back to the titular character, reminding us that this was Oz's story all along, and he may be even more depraved than we initially thought. When Farrell first appeared as the character in The Batman, he was certainly a bad guy, but he was also used as comic relief. After the finale, we now see him for who he really is. Sofia was right: Oz Cobb is a monster."

Lisa Babick of TV Fanatic gave the episode a perfect 5 star rating out of 5 rating and wrote, "Honestly, I hated The Penguin Season 1 Episode 8 in so many ways, but I'll admit — it was also one of the best episodes of the entire series. Weren't they all, though?" Chris Gallardo of Telltale TV gave the episode a 4.5 star rating out of 5 rating and wrote, "With Oz finally accomplishing his dream for himself and Francis, it's only a matter of time when he'll strike back against his new nemesis: Batman. Ending with Oz's high note, The Penguin concludes with a tremendous impact for things to come while leaving a fulfilling sendoff for this series."

=== Accolades ===
TVLine named Colin Farrell the "Performer of the Week" for the week of November 16, 2024, for his performance in the episode. The site wrote, "It was a hell of a performance throughout the entire finale, including the awful moment when Oz kills Vic because he perceived the teenage boy's love and loyalty as a hindrance and potential weakness for him. Farrell's complex work ensured we understand why Oz makes the decisions he does, even if we hate the character for it."
