= Toni Vaz =

American stuntwoman (1922–2024)

Adella Elitha Antonia Thomas (December 11, 1922 – October 4, 2024), better known as Toni Vaz, was an American stuntwoman. She was one of the first Black stuntwomen in Hollywood. Vaz died on October 4, 2024, at the age of 101. She was the founder of the NAACP Image Awards.
