= About a Boy (TV series) =

- Genre: Sitcom
- Created by: Jason Katims
- Based on: About a Boy by Nick Hornby
- Starring: David Walton; Benjamin Stockham; Al Madrigal; Annie Mumolo; Minnie Driver
- Theme music composer: Brett Dennen
- Opening theme: "Comeback Kid (That's My Dog)"
- Composers: Jon Ehrlich & Jason Derlatka
- Country of origin: United States
- Original language: English
- No. of seasons: 2
- No. of episodes: 33 (6 unaired on NBC) (list of episodes)

Production
- Executive producers: Jason Katims; Jon Favreau; Tim Bevan; Eric Fellner; Liza Chasin; Robert De Niro; Jane Rosenthal; Michelle Lee; David M. Israel
- Camera setup: Single-camera
- Running time: 30 minutes
- Production companies: True Jack Productions; Working Title Television; Tribeca Productions; Universal Television

Original release
- Network: NBC
- Release: February 22, 2014 – July 20, 2015

About a Boy is an American single-camera sitcom television series that aired on NBC from February 22, 2014, to July 20, 2015. The show was created by Jason Katims and premiered as a midseason replacement following the 2014 Winter Olympics. It was the second adaptation based on the 1998 novel of the same title by Nick Hornby, preceded by the 2002 theatrical film. The series starred David Walton, Minnie Driver and Benjamin Stockham, and used "Comeback Kid (That's My Dog)" by Brett Dennen as its theme song.

On May 9, 2014, NBC renewed the series for a second season. Season 2 premiered on October 16, 2014, and contained 20 episodes. The fourteenth episode of season 2 aired on February 17, 2015, before the show went on hiatus to accommodate the return of The Voice.

On May 8, 2015, NBC canceled the series after two seasons. On July 20, 2015, the remaining six episodes were released via iTunes, Amazon, and Google Play.

== Premise ==
Successful songwriter and bachelor Will Freeman lives a carefree life in San Francisco as the "ultimate man-child". His perfect world is turned upside down when single mother Fiona and her 11-year-old son Marcus move in next door.

== Cast ==
=== Main ===
- David Walton as Will Freeman, a successful songwriter and bachelor. After he wrote a hit song he was granted a life of free time, free love and freedom from financial woes. He's single, unemployed and loves it. When Fiona and Marcus move in next door, he starts to bond with them.
- Minnie Driver as Fiona Bowa, a vegan hippie and an overbearing mother to her only child, Marcus, whom she is raising by herself. She was once married and then got divorced. Fiona likes to meditate, take care of flowers, and doesn't like her new neighbor, Will.
- Benjamin Stockham as Marcus Bowa, an 11-year-old only child. He is possibly too close to his mother, since she has been raising him by herself. He is not very popular at school, so he is often teased by popular boys. When he and his mom move to a new house, he meets his new neighbor Will in whom he finds a new best friend.
- Al Madrigal as Andy. He is Will's best friend. He has four children and his wife is Laurie. He thinks that raising a child is the greatest honor that a person can have. He is more mature than Will, since he has children that he needs to take care of. He was once a DJ.
- Annie Mumolo as Laurie (season 2, recurring in season 1). She is Andy's wife, with whom she has four children. Laurie and Will tend to not get along even with Andy's persistence.

=== Recurring ===
- Adrianne Palicki as Dr. Samantha Lake, Will's love interest in seasons 1 and 2.
- Chris Diamantopoulos as Mr. Chris, Marcus's teacher
- Izabela Vidovic as Shea Garcia-Miller, Marcus' friend and love interest in season 2. She is loosely based on the character Ellie from the book and movie.
- Andrea Anders as Joanne
- Cricket Wampler as Hannah Bickleman
- Dax Shepard as Crosby Braverman (along with Crosby's infant daughter Aida Braverman)
- Dusan Brown as Jackson
- Keith Powell as Richard
- Leslie Bibb as Dakota
- Rachel Breitag as Shasta
- Zach Cregger as TJ
- Christine Woods as Liz

== Episodes ==
Season	Episodes	Originally released	
Season	Episodes	First released	Last released
1	13	February 22, 2014	May 13, 2014
2	20	October 14, 2014	July 20, 2015

== Production ==
On January 10, 2014, NBC announced that About a Boy would premiere following the 2014 Winter Olympics on February 21, 2014, at 10:30 pm EST (later revised by the network to Saturday, February 22, at 11:05 pm EST). It then moved to its regular timeslot on Tuesday, March 4, 2014, 9:00 pm EST following The Voice.

On May 9, 2014, NBC renewed About a Boy for a second season.

On May 11, 2015, NBC officially cancelled About a Boy after two seasons.

A total of 33 episodes were produced over two seasons.

== Broadcast ==
About a Boy aired on Global in Canada shortly after the original broadcast. In the United Kingdom and Ireland, the series premiered on Sky 1 on March 31, 2014. The second season premiered on February 22, 2015. In South Africa, it airs on M-net. In Brazil, it airs on HBO Family and on Germany, Austria and Switzerland, it airs on Comedy Central Germany. The second season debuted on October 16, 2014. The show used to air everyday from Monday to Friday at 9:30 pm on Comedy Central India. It premiered in Australia on June 1, 2015, on FOX8.

== Ratings ==
Season	Timeslot (ET)	Episodes	Premiered		Ended		TV Season	Rank	Viewers (in millions)
Season	Timeslot (ET)	Episodes	Date	Premiere Viewers (in millions)	Date	Finale Viewers (in millions)	TV Season	Rank	Viewers (in millions)
1	Tuesday 9:00 pm	13	February 22, 2014	8.26	May 13, 2014	5.68	2014	#48	8.12
2	Tuesday 9:30 pm	20	October 14, 2014	5.83	February 17, 2015	2.41	2014–15	#117	4.63
