= Jennifer Getzinger =

American film director

- Born: September 26, 1967 (age 58); New Haven, Connecticut, U.S.
- Education: Boston University
- Occupations: Film director, script supervisor, television director
- Years active: 1993–present
- Children: Theodore Scott Getzinger, Esme Rosella Getzinger

Jennifer Getzinger (born September 26, 1967) is an American director and script supervisor of film and television.

== Career ==
For much of her career she worked as a script supervisor on a number of notable films including The Prophecy (1995), Phantoms (1998), Clay Pigeons (1998), Requiem for a Dream (2000), and The Devil Wears Prada (2006). She was also script supervisor for the television series Strangers with Candy, Sex and the City, The Comeback, The Sopranos, and Mad Men, making her episodic directorial debut on the latter series. When she was invited by Weiner to join her on Mad Men from The Sopranos as a script supervisor. The job would entain her moving to Los Angeles which she was hesitant about. She said yes on the condition that she be allowed to switch into director. Weiner agreed and she was offered directing jobs on the second season.

She has been nominated for three Directors Guild of America Awards for directing the Mad Men episodes "The Gypsy and the Hobo" (season 3, episode 11; 2009), "The Suitcase" (season 4, episode 7; 2010), and "A Little Kiss" (season 5, episodes 1 & 2; 2012).

Her other television directing credits include Hung, The Killing, Orange is the New Black, Agent Carter, How to Get Away with Murder, Shut Eye, Jessica Jones, Outlander, Counterpart, Daredevil, Westworld, Dead To Me, Why Women Kill, Outer Range, and The Nevers. In 1998, she directed the independent film Blue Christmas, which was written by her older brother, Scott Getzinger. She also wrote and directed the short film Save Me in 2006.

In 2023, she directed the sixth episode of the Star Wars series Ahsoka.

== Personal life ==
Jennifer is the daughter of Mike Warren (né Warren Edwin Getzinger) (1933–2013), the creator and star of the Connecticut children's TV series The Friends of Mr. Goober, which was broadcast on WNHC-TV (now WTNH) Channel 8 in New Haven from 1961 to 1971. Warren also hosted Connecticut Bandstand on WNHC-TV in 1961 and later co-hosted the game show Dialing for Dollars on Channel 8 with Bob Norman. Warren died November 29, 2013, at age 80.

== Filmography ==
As a director

=== Film ===
Year	Title	Notes
1998	Blue Christmas	Directorial debut
2006	Save Me	Short film

=== Television ===
As a director

Year	Title	Notes
2008–2015	Mad Men	10 episodes; also script supervisor
2010	Hung	Episode: "Mind Bullets or Bang Bang Bang Bang Motherfucker"
2010	Men of a Certain Age	Episode: "Same as the Old Boss"
2011	Desperate Housewives	Episode: "Suspicion Song"
2011	The Killing	Episode: "A Soundless Echo"
2011–2012	The Big C	4 episodes
2011–2012	Suits	2 episodes
2012	Wedding Band	Episode: "Don't Forget About Me"
2012	Up All Night	2 episodes
2013	The Carrie Diaries	Episode: "Fright Night"
2013	1600 Penn	Episode: "Frosting/Nixon"
2013	Masters of Sex	2 episodes
2013	Revenge	Episode: "Surrender"
2013–2014	Law & Order: SVU	2 episodes
2014	Orange is the New Black	Episode: "Little Mustachioed Shit"
2014	Satisfaction	Episode: "Through Self Discovery"
2015	The Returned	2 episodes
2015	Manhattan	Episode: "Behold the Lord of the Executioner"
2015–2019	How to Get Away with Murder	3 episodes
2016	Agent Carter	2 episodes
2016	Good Girls Revolt	Episode: "Dateline"
2017	Shut Eye	Episode: "Crimes and Punishment"
2017–2018	Outlander	4 episodes
2018	Counterpart	3 episodes
2018	The Man in the High Castle	Episode: "Kasumi (Through the Mists)"
2018	Daredevil	Episode: "No Good Deed"
2018–2019	Jessica Jones	3 episodes
2020	Dead to Me	2 episodes
2020	Westworld	2 episodes
2021	Why Women Kill	Episode: "Lady in the Lake"
2022	Candy	Episode: "Happy Wife, Happy Life"
2022	Outer Range	2 episodes
2023	The Morning Show	Episode: "Strict Scrutiny"
2023	The Nevers	2 episodes
2023–present	Ahsoka	Episode: "Part Six - Far, Far Away"; also directed 2 episodes for future 2 season
2024	The Penguin	Episode: "A Great or Little Thing"
2025	High Potential	Episode: "Partners"
2025	Happy Face	Episode: "Killing Shame"

== Awards and nominations ==
Organizations	Year	Category	Work	Result	Ref.
BAFTA Awards	2011	International Programme	Mad Men	Nominated	
Directors Guild of America Awards	2009	Outstanding Directing – Drama Series	Mad Men (episode: "The Gypsy and the Hobo")	Nominated	
Directors Guild of America Awards	2010	Outstanding Directing – Drama Series	Mad Men (episode: "The Suitcase")	Nominated	
Directors Guild of America Awards	2012	Outstanding Directing – Drama Series	Mad Men (episode: "A Little Kiss")	Nominated	
Directors Guild of America Awards	2024	Outstanding Directing – Miniseries or TV Film	The Penguin (episode: "A Great or Little Thing")	Nominated	
