= Benjamin Stockham =

American actor (born 2000)

- Born: July 8, 2000 (age 25); La Mesa, California, U.S.
- Occupation: Actor
- Years active: 2008–present

Benjamin James Stockham (born July 8, 2000) is an American actor. He is known for his role of Robby Gunderson in the 2010 Fox sitcom Sons of Tucson, and previously starred as Xander Gilchrist in the NBC sitcom 1600 Penn. He played Marcus Bowa in the NBC comedy About a Boy.

== Life and career ==
Born in La Mesa, California, and raised in nearby Santee, currently resides in Los Angeles. In addition to acting, Stockham enjoys drawing, and he has been asked to illustrate a children's book.

Stockham first appearance was in the film Quarantine. He also appeared in a long running Fidelity commercial as well as several other national spots. He has appeared in multiple TV shows. His big breakthrough came in the FOX sitcom Sons of Tucson as Robby Gunderson.

He has also appeared in TV movies and films including Decoding Annie Parker, Saving Santa and Simon Says and TV shows such as Rizzoli & Isles, CSI: NY, NCIS and Criminal Minds.

Benjamin Stockham starred in 2013 as Xander Gilchrist, the youngest family member living in the White House, in the NBC family comedy 1600 Penn.

He also played Marcus in the NBC comedy About a Boy.

In 2014, Stockham appeared in a public service announcement for the My Life My Power speaking out against bullying.

== Filmography ==
TV and Film
Year	Title	Role	Notes
2008	Quarantine	Infected Child	Minor role
2009	Criminal Minds	Young Call	Episode: "Haunted"
2010	Sons of Tucson	Robby Gunderson	Main role 2011: Young Artist Award for Best Performance in a TV Series (Comedy or Drama) - Leading Young Actor for Sons of Tucson
2010	CSI: NY	Young Tom Reynolds	Episode: "Hide Sight"
2011	Simon Says	Albert	Movie
2011	Rizzoli & Isles	Aidan Dunbar	Episode: "My Own Worst Enemy"
2013	Second Chances	Luke	TV movie, previously titled Two In
2013	Once Upon a Time	Young Owen Flynn	Episode: "Welcome to Storybrooke"
2013	1600 Penn	Xander Gilchrist	Main role
2013	Decoding Annie Parker	Young William	Movie
2013	A Country Christmas	Zach Logan	Movie
2014	Mockingbird	Jacob's Friend #2	
2014–2015	About a Boy	Marcus Bowa	TV series
2016	NCIS	Henry	Episode: "Homefront"
2016	Lost & Found	Mark Walton	Movie
2017	Gotham	Alex Winthrop	Episode: "A Dark Knight: The Demon's Head"
2019	Young Sheldon	Preston	Episode: "An Entrepreneurialist and a Swat on the Bottom"
TBA	B.O.O.: Bureau of Otherworldly Operations	Henry	Voice
