= Primetime Emmy Award for Outstanding Choreography =

Annual award

Primetime Emmy Award for Outstanding Choreography for Scripted Programming
- Awarded for: Outstanding Choreography
- Country: United States
- Presented by: Academy of Television Arts & Sciences
- First award: 1955
- Currently held by: Palm Royale (2026)
- Website: emmys.com

Primetime Emmy Award for Outstanding Choreography for Variety or Reality Programming
- Awarded for: Outstanding Choreography
- Country: United States
- Presented by: Academy of Television Arts & Sciences
- First award: 1955
- Currently held by: The Apple Music Super Bowl LX Halftime Show Starring Bad Bunny (2026)
- Website: emmys.com

This is a list of winners of the Primetime Emmy Award for Outstanding Choreography. With the exception of 2013, the award is given at the Creative Arts Emmy Awards ceremony.

Starting in 2019, separate awards are given for scripted programs and reality or variety programs.

== Winners and nominations ==
=== 1950s ===
Year	Program	Episode	Nominees	Network
1955
1955	The Jackie Gleason Show		June Taylor	CBS
1955	Max Liebman Spectaculars		Rod Alexander	NBC
1955	Texaco Star Theatre	"Here Comes Donald"	Louis DaPron	NBC
1955	Your Hit Parade		Tony Charmoli and Bob Herget	NBC
1956
1956	Your Hit Parade	"Show Biz"	Tony Charmoli	NBC
1956	The Jackie Gleason Show		June Taylor	CBS
1956	Max Liebman Presents; Shower of Stars with Ethel Merman		James Starbuck	NBC; CBS
1956	Max Liebman Spectaculars		Rod Alexander	NBC
1956	Producers' Showcase	"Peter Pan"	Jerome Robbins	NBC
1959
1959	An Evening with Fred Astaire		Hermes Pan	NBC
1959	Omnibus	"Dancing: A Man's Game"	Gene Kelly	NBC

=== 1970s ===
Year	Program	Episode	Nominees	Network
1970
1970	This Is Tom Jones	"Mary Hopkins, Jose Feliciano and Shelley Berman"	Norman Maen	ABC
1970	Ann-Margret — From Hollywood with Love		David Winters	CBS
1970	The Red Skelton Hour		Tom Hansen	CBS
1971
1971	The Carol Burnett Show	"Nanette Fabray and Ken Berry"	Ernie Flatt	CBS
1971	George M!		Alan Johnson	NBC
1971	Hamlet		Claude Chagrin	NBC
1972
1972	Jack Lemmon in 'S Wonderful, 'S Marvelous, 'S Gershwin		Alan Johnson	NBC
1972	The Carol Burnett Show	"Mel Tormé and Nanette Fabray"	Ernie Flatt	CBS
1972	The Fabulous Fordies		Tom Hansen	NBC
1973
1973	Liza with a Z		Bob Fosse	NBC
1973	The Carol Burnett Show	"Family Show"	Ernie Flatt	CBS
1973	The Julie Andrews Hour	"Robert Goulet and Joel Grey"	Tony Charmoli	ABC
1974
1974	Mitzi... A Tribute to the American Housewife		Tony Charmoli	CBS
1974	The Carol Burnett Show	"The Australia Show"	Ernie Flatt	CBS
1974	Sammy Davis Starring in NBC Follies		Carl Jablonski	NBC
1975
1975	Queen of the Stardust Ballroom		Marge Champion	CBS
1975	Cher	"Freddie Prinze and the Pointer Sisters"	Dee Dee Wood	CBS
1975	Shirley MacLaine: If They Could See Me Now		Alan Johnson	CBS
1976
1976	Gypsy in My Soul		Tony Charmoli	CBS
1976	Ann-Margret Smith		Rob Iscove	NBC
1976	The Carol Burnett Show	"Roddy McDowall and Bernadette Peters"	Ernie Flatt	CBS
1976	Lola!		Lester Wilson	ABC
1976	Mary's Incredible Dream		Tony Charmoli	CBS
1977
1977	America Salutes Richard Rodgers: The Sound of His Music		Ron Field	CBS
1977	The Carol Burnett Show	"The Pointer Sisters"	Ernie Flatt	CBS
1977	Minstrel Man		Donald McKayle	CBS
1977	The Shirley MacLaine Special: Where Do We Go from Here?		Alan Johnson	CBS
1977	Swan Lake (Live from Lincoln Center)		David Blair	PBS
1978
1978	The Sentry Collection Presents Ben Vereen: His Roots		Ron Field	ABC
1978	The Carol Burnett Show	"The Final Show"	Ernie Flatt	CBS
1978	Mitzi... Zings Into Spring		Tony Charmoli	CBS
1978	New York City Ballet: Coppelia (Live from Lincoln Center)		George Balanchine and Alexandra Danilova	PBS
1978	Ziegfeld: The Man and His Women		Miriam Nelson	NBC
1979
1979	The 3rd Barry Manilow Special		Kevin Carlisle	ABC
1979	The Martha Graham Dance Company: Clytemnestra (Great Performances)		Martha Graham	PBS
1979	The Muppets Go Hollywood		Anita Mann	CBS

=== 1980s ===
Year	Program	Episode	Nominees	Network
1980	Outstanding Achievement in Choreography			
1980	Shirley MacLaine... Every Little Moment		Alan Johnson	CBS
1980	Baryshnikov on Broadway		Ron Field	ABC
1980	Uptown — A Musical Comedy History of Harlem's Apollo		Lester Wilson	NBC
1980	Outstanding Individual Achievement - Special Events (Note: As a juried award, nominees had to garner 50% approval to win the award. The nominees did not meet the benchmark and no award was given.)			
1980	The 52nd Annual Academy Awards	"Dancin' on the Silver Screen"	Walter Painter	ABC
1981
1981	Lynda Carter's Celebration		Walter Painter	CBS
1981	Lily: Sold Out		Tony Charmoli	CBS
1981	Sixty Years of Seduction		Lester Wilson	ABC
1981	The Tempest Live with the San Francisco Ballet (Great Performances)		Michael Smuin	PBS
1981	The Tim Conway Show	"219"	Don Crichton	CBS
1982
1982	Fame	"Come One, Come All"	Debbie Allen	NBC
1982	The 54th Annual Academy Awards		Walter Painter	ABC
1982	Ain't Misbehavin'		Arthur Faria	NBC
1982	Baryshnikov in Hollywood		Peter Anastos and Michael Kidd	CBS
1982	Shirley MacLaine... Illusions		Alan Johnson	CBS
1983
1983	Fame	"Class Act"	Debbie Allen	NBC
1983	The 55th Annual Academy Awards		Walter Painter	ABC
1983	The Catherine Wheel		Twyla Tharp	PBS
1983	Motown 25: Yesterday, Today, Forever		Lester Wilson	NBC
1984
1984	Dance in America: A Song for Dead Warriors — San Francisco Ballet (Great Performances)		Michael Smuin	PBS
1984	Dance in America: Choreographer's Notebook — Stravinsky Piano Ballets by Peter Martins (Great Performances)		Peter Martins	PBS
1984	Fame	"Fame Takes a Look at Music '83"	Debbie Allen	Syndicated
1984	The 1984 Tony Awards		Albert Stephenson	CBS
1985
1985	Dance in America: Baryshnikov by Tharp with the American Ballet Theatre (Great Performances)		Twyla Tharp	PBS
1985	The 57th Annual Academy Awards		Scott Salmon	ABC
1985	Fame	"The Rivalry"	Debbie Allen	Syndicated
1985	Night of 100 Stars II		Albert Stephenson	ABC
1985	A Solid Gold Christmas		Anita Mann	Syndicated
1986
1986	Sylvia Fine Kaye's Musical Comedy Tonight III (Great Performances)		Walter Painter	PBS
1986	Copacabana		Grover Dale	CBS
1986	Solid Gold	"Salute to Frank Sinatra"	Anita Mann	Syndicated
1987
1987	Liberty Weekend 1986 — Closing Ceremonies		Michael Peters and Dee Dee Wood	ABC
1987	Happy Birthday, Hollywood		Walter Painter	ABC
1987	Moonlighting	"Big Man on Mulberry Street"	Bill Landrum and Jacqui Landrum	ABC
1988
1988	Irving Berlin's 100th Birthday Celebration		Alan Johnson	CBS
1988	Celebrating Gershwin (Great Performances)		Patricia Birch	PBS
1988	The Smothers Brothers Comedy Hour	"Four Swans"	Toni Basil	CBS
1988	The Tracey Ullman Show	"The Pits"	Paula Abdul	Fox
1989
1989	The Disney/MGM Studios Theme Park Grand Opening		Walter Painter	NBC
1989	The Tracey Ullman Show	"The Wave Girls", "D.U.I.", "The Cure", "Maggie in Peril, Part 1"	Paula Abdul	Fox
1989	The Debbie Allen Special		Debbie Allen	ABC

=== 1990s ===
Year	Program	Episode	Nominees	Network
1990
1990	The 17th Annual American Music Awards		Paula Abdul, Dean Barlow and Michael Darrin	ABC
1990	In Living Color	"Episode 105"	Rosie Perez	Fox
1990	Polly		Debbie Allen	NBC
1990	Sing! Sesame Street Remembers Joe Raposo and His Music	"Peanut Butter Ballet"	Jacques d'Amboise	PBS
1991
1991	Motown 30: What's Goin' On!	"African American Odyssey"	Debbie Allen	CBS
1991	After the Shock		Lester Wilson	USA
1991	The Josephine Baker Story		George Faison	HBO
1992
1992	Paul Taylor's "Speaking in Tongues" (Dance in America / Great Performances)		Paul Taylor	PBS
1992	The 64th Annual Academy Awards		Debbie Allen	ABC
1992	Comic Relief V		Lester Wilson	HBO
1992	In Living Color	"Episode 307"	Rosie Perez	Fox
1992	Stompin' at the Savoy		Norma Miller	CBS
1993
1993	The Jacksons: An American Dream		Michael Peters	ABC
1993	The 65th Annual Academy Awards		Debbie Allen	ABC
1993	Bob Hope: The First 90 Years		Don Crichton	NBC
1993	In Living Color	"Episode 419"	Rosie Perez	Fox
1993	Liza Minnelli: Live from Radio City Music Hall		Susan Stroman	NPT
1994
1994	Comedy Hall of Fame		Linda Talcott	NBC
1995
1995	Two by Dove (Great Performances / Dance in America)		Ulysses Dove	PBS
1995	The 22nd American Music Awards		Jamie King	ABC
1995	The 67th Annual Academy Awards		Debbie Allen	ABC
1995	House of Buggin'	"Episode 102"	Ken Roberson	Fox
1995	In Search of Dr. Seuss		Vincent Paterson and Smith Wordes	TNT
1996
1996	1995 Miss America Pageant		Anita Mann and Charonne Mose	NBC
1996	Comic Relief VII		Vincent Paterson	HBO
1996	The Ice Princess		Michael Seibert	HBO
1996	1995 MTV Video Music Awards	Michael Jackson performance	Travis Payne and LaVelle Smith Jr.	MTV
1996	Pride and Prejudice	"Part 1"	Jane Gibson	A&E
1997
1997	Scott Hamilton: Upside Down		Sarah Kawahara	PBS
1997	3rd Rock from the Sun	"A Nightmare on Dick Street"	Marguerite Derricks	NBC
1997	The Drew Carey Show	"New York and Queens"	Keith Young	ABC
1997	Miss Evers' Boys		Dianne McIntyre	HBO
1997	Mrs. Santa Claus		Rob Marshall	ABC
1997	The Wrecker's Ball: Three Dances by Paul Taylor		Paul Taylor	PBS
1998
1998	Fame L.A.	"Pilot"	Marguerite Derricks and Peggy Holmes	Syndicated
1998	1997 Jerry Lewis MDA Labor Day Telethon		Anita Mann	Syndicated
1998	Rodgers & Hammerstein's Cinderella		Rob Marshall	ABC
1998	The 70th Annual Academy Awards		Daniel Ezralow	ABC
1999
1999	Dance in America: A Hymn for Alvin Ailey (Great Performances)		Judith Jamison	PBS
1999	Goodwill Games Opening Celebration		Marguerite Derricks	TBS
1999	Janet: The Velvet Rope		Michael Andrews, Teresa Espinosa, Tina Landon and Robert Vinson	HBO
1999	The 71st Annual Academy Awards		Debbie Allen	ABC
1999	Tracey Takes On...	"Drugs"	Joseph Malone	HBO
1999	UniverSoul Circus	"Straps"	Jean Claude Belmat	HBO

=== 2000s ===
Year	Program	Episode	Nominees	Network
2000
2000	Annie		Rob Marshall	ABC
2000	Cher: Live in Concert – From the MGM Grand in Las Vegas		Dorian Sanchez	HBO
2000	Ice Wars		Brian Boitano and Marguerite Derricks	CBS
2000	Introducing Dorothy Dandridge		Kim Blank	HBO
2000	The Drew Carey Show	"Drew and Kate Boink"	Jerry Mitchell	ABC
2001
2001	Blast!		Jim Moore, George Pinney and Jon Vanderkolff	PBS
2001	Bojangles		Henry Tang	Showtime
2001	Grounded for Life	"Mrs. Finnerty, You Have a Lovely Daughter"	Kenny Ortega	Fox
2001	Miss America 2000		Barry Lather	ABC
2001	Peter Pan Starring Cathy Rigby		Patti Colombo	A&E
2001	Target Stars on Ice		Sandra Bezic, Christopher Dean, Lea Ann Miller, Michael Seibert and Jayne Torvill	A&E
2002
2002	The 74th Annual Academy Awards		Debra Brown	ABC
2002	Opening Ceremony Salt Lake 2002 Olympic Winter Games		Doug Jack, Sarah Kawahara and Kenny Ortega	NBC
2002	MADtv	"Episode 701"	Monie Adamson	Fox
2002	Madonna Live: The Drowned World Tour		Debra Brown, Jamie King and Alex Magno	HBO
2002	Michael Jackson: 30th Anniversary Celebration		Glenn Douglas Packard and Brian Thomas	CBS
2002	Target Stars on Ice		Sandra Bezic, Christopher Dean, Michael Seibert and Jayne Torvill	A&E
2003
2003	Smucker's Stars on Ice		Sandra Bezic, A.C. Ciulla, Christopher Dean, Jamie Isley and Michael Seibert	A&E
2003	Boston Public	"Chapter 61"	Joseph Malone	Fox
2003	Celine in Las Vegas: Opening Night Live		Mia Michaels	CBS
2003	Meredith Willson's The Music Man		Kathleen Marshall	ABC
2004
2004	2003 Jerry Lewis MDA Labor Day Telethon		Jason Samuels Smith	Syndicated
2004	MADtv	"Episode 925"	Monie Adamson	Fox
2004	Malcolm in the Middle	"Dewey's Special Class"	Fred Tallaksen	Fox
2004	Smucker's Stars on Ice 2004		Christopher Dean and Jamie Isley	A&E
2005
2005	Smucker's Stars on Ice 2005		Christopher Dean	A&E
2005	A Christmas Carol		Dan Siretta	NBC
2005	MADtv	"Episode 1023"	Monie Adamson	Fox
2005	Reefer Madness		Mary Ann Kellogg	Showtime
2005	36th NAACP Image Awards		Jeffrey Page, Anthony Talauega and Richmond Talauega	Fox
2006
2006	High School Musical		Charles Klapow, Kenny Ortega and Bonnie Story	Disney
2006	Dancing with the Stars	"Episode 208 (Freestyle)"	Cheryl Burke	ABC
2006	Dancing with the Stars	"Episode 204 (Paso Doble)"	Cheryl Burke, Nick Kosovich	ABC
2006	Dancing with the Stars	"Episode 208 (Jive)"	Tony Dovolani	ABC
2006	Malcolm in the Middle	"Bomb Shelter"	Fred Tallaksen	Fox
2006	The Suite Life of Zack & Cody	"Commercial Breaks"	Travis Payne	Disney
2007
2007	So You Think You Can Dance	"Calling You"	Mia Michaels	Fox
2007	So You Think You Can Dance	"Ramalama (Bang Bang)"	Wade Robson	Fox
2007	Tony Bennett: An American Classic		Rob Marshall and John DeLuca	NBC
2007	Dancing with the Stars	"Episode 303A"	Louis Van Amstel	ABC
2008
2008	So You Think You Can Dance	"Hummingbird and Flower", "The Chairman's Waltz"	Wade Robson	Fox
2008	Dancing with the Stars	"Para Los Rumberos"	Julianne Hough	ABC
2008	High School Musical 2	"What Time Is It?", "Fabulous", "Work This Out", "I Don't Dance", "You Are the Music in Me", "For One"	Kenny Ortega, Charles Klapow and Bonnie Story	Disney
2008	So You Think You Can Dance	"Table", "Sweet Dreams (Are Made of This)"	Mandy Moore	Fox
2008	So You Think You Can Dance	"Transformers", "Fuego"	Shane Sparks	Fox
2009
2009	The 81st Annual Academy Awards	"Musicals Are Back"	Rob Ashford	ABC
2009	So You Think You Can Dance	"Adam and Eve", "Silence"	Tyce Diorio	Fox
2009	Dancing with the Stars	"Great Balls of Fire"	Derek Hough and Julianne Hough	ABC
2009	So You Think You Can Dance	"A Los Amigos"	Dmitry Chaplin	Fox
2009	So You Think You Can Dance	"Bleeding Love"	Tabitha and Napoleon D'umo	Fox
2009	So You Think You Can Dance	"Mercy"	Mia Michaels	Fox

=== 2010s ===
Year	Program	Routine(s)	Nominees	Network
2010 (62nd)
2010 (62nd)	So You Think You Can Dance	"Gravity", "Addiction/Koop Island Blues/One"	Mia Michaels	Fox
2010 (62nd)	The 82nd Annual Academy Awards	"Opening Number", "No One Wants to Do It Alone/Score Suite"	Adam Shankman	ABC
2010 (62nd)	Dancing with the Stars	"Living on Video", "Anything Goes"	Derek Hough	ABC
2010 (62nd)	Dancing with the Stars	"Malagueña"	Chelsie Hightower and Derek Hough	ABC
2010 (62nd)	So You Think You Can Dance	"Fear"	Stacey Tookey	Fox
2011 (63rd)
2011 (63rd)	So You Think You Can Dance	"Scars", "Fallin'", "Outta Your Mind"	Tabitha and Napoleon D'umo	Fox
2011 (63rd)	So You Think You Can Dance	"Every Little Thing She Does Is Magic", "When We Dance", "This Bitter Earth – On the Nature of Daylight"	Mia Michaels	Fox
2011 (63rd)	Dancing with the Stars	"I Write Sins Not Tragedies", "Hedwig's Theme", "My Love"	Mark Ballas	ABC
2011 (63rd)	So You Think You Can Dance	"Oh Yeah", "Boogie Shoes", "I Surrender"	Mandy Moore	Fox
2011 (63rd)	So You Think You Can Dance	"Mad World", "Sundrenched World", "Heaven Is a Place on Earth"	Stacey Tookey	Fox
2011 (63rd)	So You Think You Can Dance	"Collide", "How It Ends", "Fix You"	Travis Wall	Fox
2012 (64th)
2012 (64th)	Smash	"National Pastime", "Let's Be Bad", "Never Met a Wolf"	Joshua Bergasse	NBC
2012 (64th)	Dancing with the Stars	"Without You"	Travis Wall, Teddy Forance and Nick Lazzarini	ABC
2012 (64th)	So You Think You Can Dance	"Whatever Lola Wants", "Please Mr. Jailor", "Where Do I Begin"	Spencer Liff	Fox
2012 (64th)	So You Think You Can Dance	"Misty Blue", "Velocity"	Christopher Scott	Fox
2012 (64th)	So You Think You Can Dance	"In This Shirt", "Turning Tables", "Heart Asks for Pleasure First"	Stacey Tookey	Fox
2013 (65th)
2013 (65th)	Dancing with the Stars	"Hey Pachuco", "Para Los Rumberos", "Walking on Air"	Derek Hough	ABC
2013 (65th)	Dancing with the Stars	"Heart Cry", "Stars"	Derek Hough and Allison Holker	ABC
2013 (65th)	Rodgers & Hammerstein's Carousel (Live from Lincoln Center)		Warren Carlyle	PBS
2013 (65th)	So You Think You Can Dance	"Call of the Wild (Circle of Life)", "Love Cats", "Beautiful People"	Tabitha and Napoleon D'umo	Fox
2013 (65th)	So You Think You Can Dance	"The Power of Love", "Wild Horses"	Mandy Moore	Fox
2013 (65th)	So You Think You Can Dance	"Possibly Maybe", "Turning Page", "Sail"	Sonya Tayeh	Fox
2013 (65th)	So You Think You Can Dance	"Where the Light Gets In", "Without You", "Unchained Melody"	Travis Wall	Fox
2014 (66th)
2014 (66th)	So You Think You Can Dance	"Puttin' on the Ritz", "Gold Rush", "Run the World"	Tabitha and Napoleon D'umo	Fox
2014 (66th)	Dancing with the Stars	"Human", "Ameksa", "Too Darn Hot"	Derek Hough	ABC
2014 (66th)	So You Think You Can Dance	"The Edge of Glory", "Feelin' Good", "I Can't Make You Love Me"	Mandy Moore	Fox
2014 (66th)	So You Think You Can Dance	"Trigger", "Sand", "The Gravel Road"	Christopher Scott	Fox
2014 (66th)	So You Think You Can Dance	"Hanging by a Thread", "Wicked Game", "Medicine"	Travis Wall	Fox
2015 (67th)
2015 (67th)	Dancing with the Stars	"Elastic Heart"	Derek Hough, Julianne Hough and Tessandra Chavez	ABC
2015 (67th)	So You Think You Can Dance	"Wave", "When I Go", "Wind Beneath My Wings"	Travis Wall	Fox
2015 (67th)	Dancing with the Stars	"369", "It's Not Unusual", "Sing with a Swing-Apache"	Witney Carson	ABC
2015 (67th)	So You Think You Can Dance	"Hernando's Hideaway", "World on a String", "Maybe This Time"	Spencer Liff	Fox
2015 (67th)	So You Think You Can Dance	"Vow", "So Broken", "Europe, After the Rain"	Sonya Tayeh	Fox
2016 (68th)
2016 (68th)	America's Best Dance Crew	"Runaway Baby", "Take U There", "Summer Thing"	Quest Crew	MTV
2016 (68th)	Crazy Ex-Girlfriend	"I'm So Good at Yoga", "A Boy Band Made Up of Four Joshes", "Settle for Me"	Kathryn Burns	The CW
2016 (68th)	Dancing with the Stars	"Footprints in the Sand", "Grace Kelly", "Cry Little Sister"	Derek Hough	ABC
2016 (68th)	So You Think You Can Dance	"Beautiful Friends", "November", "Gimme All Your Love"	Travis Wall	Fox
2016 (68th)	So You Think You Can Dance	"Dibidy Dop"	Anthony Morigerato	Fox
2017 (69th)
2017 (69th)	Dancing with the Stars	"On Top of the World", "Carol of the Bells"	Mandy Moore	ABC
2017 (69th)	So You Think You Can Dance	"The Mirror", "Send in the Clowns", "She Used to Be Mine"	Travis Wall	Fox
2017 (69th)	Dancing with the Stars	"Kairos"	Derek Hough	ABC
2017 (69th)	The Real O'Neals	"Born This Way", "West Side Story", "Boyfriend"	Fred Tallaksen	ABC
2017 (69th)	So You Think You Can Dance	"Unsteady", "This Is Not the End"	Mandy Moore	Fox
2018 (70th)
2018 (70th)	So You Think You Can Dance	"Brand New", "To Make You Feel My Love"	Mandy Moore	Fox
2018 (70th)	The Late Late Show with James Corden	"The Greatest Showman", "Crosswalk the Musical on Broadway"	Chloe Arnold	CBS
2018 (70th)	So You Think You Can Dance	"Change Is Everything", "Strange Fruit"	Travis Wall	Fox
2018 (70th)	So You Think You Can Dance	"The Man That Got Away", "L-O-V-E"	Al Blackstone	Fox
2018 (70th)	So You Think You Can Dance	"Prism", "Say You Won't Let Go"	Christopher Scott	Fox
2019 (71st)
2019 (71st)	Outstanding Choreography for Scripted Programming			
2019 (71st)	Crazy Ex-Girlfriend	"Don’t Be a Lawyer", "Antidepressants Are So Not a Big Deal"	Kathryn Burns	The CW
2019 (71st)	Outstanding Choreography for Variety or Reality Programming			
2019 (71st)	World of Dance	"Piece by Piece", "Don't Wanna Think", "Fix You"	Tessandra Chavez	NBC
2019 (71st)	So You Think You Can Dance	"It Takes a Lot to Know a Man", "Glass Heart Concerto"	Travis Wall	Fox
2019 (71st)	So You Think You Can Dance	"Juice", "Bump", "Yummy"	Luther Brown	Fox
2019 (71st)	World of Dance	"Drop It Like It's Hot", "Headband", "DNA"	Melvin "Timtim" Rogador	NBC
2019 (71st)	World of Dance	"Malhari", "Yeh Raat", "O Fortuna"	Suresh Mukund	NBC
2019 (71st)	World of Dance	"Pegate", "La Malanga", "Caminare"	Karen Forcano and Ricardo Vega	NBC

=== 2020s ===
Year	Program	Routine(s)	Nominees	Network
2020 (72nd)	Outstanding Choreography for Scripted Programming			
2020 (72nd)	Zoey's Extraordinary Playlist	"All I Do Is Win", "I've Got the Music in Me", "Crazy"	Mandy Moore	NBC
2020 (72nd)	Outstanding Choreography for Variety or Reality Programming			
2020 (72nd)	So You Think You Can Dance	"I'll Be Seeing You", "Mambo Italiano", "The Girl from Ipanema"	Al Blackstone	Fox
2020 (72nd)	The Oscars	"Come Alive (Opening Sequence)"	Jemel McWilliams	ABC
2020 (72nd)	Savage X Fenty Show	"Statues", "Benches", "Window"	Parris Goebel	Prime Video
2020 (72nd)	So You Think You Can Dance	"Enough Is Enough", "Sign of the Times"	Travis Wall	Fox
2020 (72nd)	World of Dance	"Dos Jueyes", "El Ray Timbal"	Jefferson Benjumea and Adrianita Avila	NBC
2021 (73rd)	Outstanding Choreography for Scripted Programming			
2021 (73rd)	Dolly Parton's Christmas on the Square	"Christmas Is the Time", "Dance Studio", "High School Dance", "Christmas on the Square Finale"	Debbie Allen	Netflix
2021 (73rd)	Genius: Aretha	"Jump", "Satisfaction", "See Saw"	Dondraico Johnson	Nat Geo
2021 (73rd)	Lucifer	"Another One Bites the Dust", "Hell", "Bad to the Bone"	Brooke Lipton	Netflix
2021 (73rd)	Zoey's Extraordinary Playlist	"Black Man in a White World", "Tightrope"	Mandy Moore and Luther Brown	NBC
2021 (73rd)	Zoey's Extraordinary Playlist	"Hello Dolly", "Starships", "Let's Get Loud"	Mandy Moore	NBC
2021 (73rd)	Outstanding Choreography for Variety or Reality Programming			
2021 (73rd)	Dancing with the Stars	"Paso Doble - Uccen", "Tap Dance - Let's Fall in Love for the Night"	Derek Hough	ABC
2021 (73rd)	Christmas in Rockefeller Center	"Rudolph the Red-Nosed Reindeer", "Christmas (Baby, Please Come Home)"	Sergio Trujillo	NBC
2021 (73rd)	Dancing with the Stars	"Argentine Tango - Toxic", "Freestyle - Sparkling Diamonds"	Artem Chigvintsev	ABC
2021 (73rd)	The Disney Holiday Singalong	"Jingle Bells"	Derek Hough	ABC
2021 (73rd)	Savage X Fenty Show Vol. 2	"Garden Scene"	Parris Goebel	Prime Video
2021 (73rd)	World of Dance	"Come Thru", "Superbad, Superslick", "Bohemian Rhapsody"	Marie Haince Lebel	NBC
2022 (74th)	Outstanding Choreography for Scripted Programming			
2022 (74th)	Euphoria	"Call Me Irresponsible", "Holding Out for a Hero", "Cheerleader"	Ryan Heffington	HBO
2022 (74th)	Goliath	"The Pain Killer"	Fred Tallaksen	Prime Video
2022 (74th)	The Porter	"Opening Stardust Dance Number", "Willie Johnson Dance Number", "Lucy's Featured Performance", "Songbird"	Christian Vincent	BET+
2022 (74th)	Schmigadoon!	"Corn Puddin'", "Tribulation", "With All of Your Heart"	Christopher Gattelli	Apple TV+
2022 (74th)	Zoey's Extraordinary Christmas	"Hello Dolly", "Starships", "Let's Get Loud"	Mandy Moore and Jillian Meyers	The Roku Channel
2022 (74th)	Outstanding Choreography for Variety or Reality Programming			
2022 (74th)	Savage X Fenty Show Vol. 3	"Opening"	Parris Goebel	Prime Video
2022 (74th)	Annie Live!	"Hard Knock Life", "We Got Annie", "NYC"	Sergio Trujillo	NBC
2022 (74th)	Dancing with the Stars	"I Got 5 on It", "Dark Fantasy"	Daniella Karagach	ABC
2022 (74th)	The Oscars	"Be Alive"	Fatima Robinson	ABC
2022 (74th)	Step Into… The Movies with Derek and Julianne Hough	"Moulin Rouge - Roxanne"	Tessandra Chavez and Derek Hough	ABC
2023 (75th)	Outstanding Choreography for Scripted Programming			
2023 (75th)	Blindspotting	"The History", "San Quentin Blues"	Jon Boogz	Starz
2023 (75th)	Grease: Rise of the Pink Ladies	"New Cool", "Hand Jive", "The Boom"	Jamal Sims	Paramount+
2023 (75th)	Grease: Rise of the Pink Ladies	"Pulling Strings", "Hit Me Again", "High Rollin'"	Jeffrey Mortensen and Louise Hradsky	Paramount+
2023 (75th)	The Marvelous Mrs. Maisel	"Trash Man", "Dream Kitchen"	Marguerite Derricks	Prime Video
2023 (75th)	Schmigadoon!	"Bells and Whistles", "Good Enough to Eat", "Bustin' Out"	Christopher Gattelli	Apple TV+
2023 (75th)	Outstanding Choreography for Variety or Reality Programming			
2023 (75th)	Dancing with the Stars	"Higher"	Derek Hough	Disney+
2023 (75th)	Beauty and the Beast: A 30th Celebration	"Be Our Guest"	Jamal Sims, Phillip Chbeeb and Makenzie Dustman	ABC
2023 (75th)	Beauty and the Beast: A 30th Celebration	"Rose Petal Suite Pt. I"	Phillip Chbeeb and Makenzie Dustman	ABC
2023 (75th)	Encanto at the Hollywood Bowl	"The Family Madrigal", "Surface Pressure"	Jamal Sims	Disney+
2023 (75th)	Savage X Fenty Show Vol. 4	"Chameleon", "Pride Rock"	Parris Goebel	Prime Video
2024 (76th)	Outstanding Choreography for Scripted Programming			
2024 (76th)	The Idol	"Rehearsal", "Music Video Shoot", "Dollhouse"	Nina McNeely	HBO
2024 (76th)	Only Murders in the Building	"Oliver's Dream Sequence", "Creatures of the Night"	John Carrafa	Hulu
2024 (76th)	Palm Royale	"The Rhumba", "Maxine's Entrance"	Brooke Lipton	Apple TV+
2024 (76th)	Physical	"Jean Franc's Advanced Aerobics Class", "Figure 8's Commercial", "Xanadu & Dreams"	Jennifer Hamilton	Apple TV+
2024 (76th)	Outstanding Choreography for Variety or Reality Programming			
2024 (76th)	The 76th Annual Tony Awards	"Opening Number", "Lifetime Achievement"	Karla Puno Garcia	CBS
2024 (76th)	Dancing with the Stars	"Moon River", "La Vie en rose"	Valentin Chmerkovskiy and Jenna Johnson	ABC
2024 (76th)	Dick Van Dyke 98 Years of Magic	"Step in Time"	Alison Faulk and Kiki Nyemchek	CBS
2024 (76th)	The Oscars	"I'm Just Ken", "In Memoriam"	Mandy Moore	ABC
2024 (76th)	RuPaul's Drag Race	"Dance!", "Queen of Wind", "Power"	Jamal Sims	MTV
2025 (77th)	Outstanding Choreography for Scripted Programming			
2025 (77th)	Étoile	"Piece 2", "Growing Pressure", "Big in Japan", "Piece 1"	Marguerite Derricks	Prime Video
2025 (77th)	Bridgerton	"Butterfly Ball", "Eros and Psyche", "Jealousy", "Wedding Dance", "Rejoining the Ton"	Jack Murphy	Netflix
2025 (77th)	Doctor Who	"There's Always a Twist"	Jack Murphy	Disney+
2025 (77th)	Severance	"Choreography & Merriment", "The Ballad of Ambrose and Gunnel"	Andrew Turteltaub	Apple TV+
2025 (77th)	Will Trent	"Last Dance", "In the Night", "Quartet No. 5", "I Can't Stand the Rain"	Danielle Sten and Lance Guillermo	ABC
2025 (77th)	Outstanding Choreography for Variety or Reality Programming			
2025 (77th)	The 67th Annual Grammy Awards	"Doechii Musical Performance"	Robbie Blue	CBS
2025 (77th)	The Apple Music Super Bowl LIX Halftime Show Starring Kendrick Lamar	"Humble", "Not Like Us"	Charm La'Donna	Fox
2025 (77th)	Beyoncé Bowl	"My House", "Sweet Honey Buckiin'", "Texas Hold 'Em"	Tyrik J. Patterson, Charm La'Donna, Christopher Grant and Parris Goebel	Netflix
2025 (77th)	The Lion King at the Hollywood Bowl	"He Lives in You"	Jamal Sims	Disney+
2025 (77th)	The Oscars	"James Bond Tribute Performance", "Quincy Jones Tribute Performance"	Mandy Moore	ABC
2026 (78th)	Outstanding Choreography for Scripted Programming			
2026 (78th)	Palm Royale	"Comin' Home Baby", "I Want to Be a Cowboy's Sweetheart", "I Had a Ball"	Brooke Lipton	Apple TV
2026 (78th)	Bridgerton	"Pink", "Full Circle", "Recital", "Masquerade", "Stag"	Sean "Jack" Murphy	Netflix
2026 (78th)	Noah's Arc: The Movie	"Love Is a Contact Sport", "Next Caller"	Christian John-Devi Vincent	Paramount+
2026 (78th)	Stumble	"Media Day Routine", "Bring It On Routine", "Truck Routine", "Elite Cheer Routine", "Car Wash Routine", "SDSJC Daytona Routine", "Buttons Daytona Routine"	Dahlston Delgado	NBC
2026 (78th)	Wednesday	"The Dead Dance"	Corey Baker	Netflix
2026 (78th)	Will Trent	"Nuevayol"	Lance Guillermo and Danielle Sten	ABC
2026 (78th)	Outstanding Choreography for Variety or Reality Programming			
2026 (78th)	The Apple Music Super Bowl LX Halftime Show Starring Bad Bunny	"Casita Medley", "EoO", "Nuevayol"	Charm La'Donna and Karina Ortiz	NBC
2026 (78th)	2025 MTV Video Music Awards	"Tate McRae Performance"	Robbie Blue	CBS
2026 (78th)	The Oscars	"Golden"	Mandy Moore	ABC
2026 (78th)	RuPaul's Drag Race	"Versatile", "Stimulate", "What's in a Ball?"	Jamal Sims	MTV
2026 (78th)	Wicked: One Wonderful Night	"The Wizard and I"	Christopher Scott	NBC

== Programs with multiple wins ==
12 wins

- So You Think You Can Dance

5 wins

- Dancing with the Stars

2 wins

- Fame
- Crazy Ex-Girlfriend

== Programs with multiple nominations ==
43 nominations

- So You Think You Can Dance

22 nominations

- Dancing with the Stars

7 nominations

- The Carol Burnett Show

6 nominations

- World of Dance

5 nominations

- Stars on Ice

4 nominations

- Fame
- Zoey's Extraordinary Playlist

3 nominations

- In Living Color
- MADtv
- Max Liebman Spectaculars
- Savage X Fenty Show

2 nominations

- Bridgerton
- Crazy Ex-Girlfriend
- The Drew Carey Show
- Grease: Rise of the Pink Ladies
- The Jackie Gleason Show
- Malcolm in the Middle
- Palm Royale
- RuPaul's Drag Race
- Schmigadoon!
- The Tracey Ullman Show
- Will Trent
- Your Hit Parade

== Choreographers with multiple wins ==
4 wins

- Debbie Allen
- Marguerite Derricks
- Derek Hough

3 wins

- Tony Charmoli
- Alan Johnson
- Mia Michaels
- Mandy Moore
- Walter Painter

2 wins

- Paula Abdul
- Kathryn Burns
- Tessandra Chavez
- Tabitha and Napoleon D'umo
- Christopher Dean
- Ron Field
- Sarah Kawahara
- Rob Marshall
- Kenny Ortega
- Michael Peters
- Wade Robson
- Travis Wall

== Choreographers with multiple nominations ==
13 nominations

- Derek Hough
- Mandy Moore

12 nominations

- Debbie Allen

10 nominations

- Travis Wall

8 nominations

- Tony Charmoli

7 nominations

- Ernie Flatt
- Alan Johnson
- Walter Painter

6 nominations

- Marguerite Derricks
- Jamal Sims
- Lester Wilson

5 nominations

- Christopher Dean
- Parris Goebel
- Anita Mann
- Mia Michaels

4 nominations

- Tessandra Chavez
- Tabitha and Napoleon D'umo
- Rob Marshall
- Kenny Ortega
- Christopher Scott
- Michael Seibert
- Fred Tallaksen

3 nominations

- Monie Adamson
- Paula Abdul
- Sandra Bezic
- Ron Field
- Julianne Hough
- Charm La'Donna
- Jack Murphy
- Rosie Perez
- Stacey Tookey

2 nominations

- Rod Alexander
- Robbie Blue
- Debra Brown
- Luther Brown
- Cheryl Burke
- Kathryn Burns
- Phillip Chbeeb
- Don Crichton
- Makenzie Dustman
- Christopher Gattelli
- Lance Guillermo
- Tom Hansen
- Jamie Isley
- Sarah Kawahara
- Jamie King
- Charles Klapow
- Spencer Liff
- Brooke Lipton
- Joseph Malone
- Travis Payne
- Vincent Paterson
- Michael Peters
- Wade Robson
- Michael Smuin
- Danielle Sten
- Albert Stephenson
- Bonnie Story
- Sonya Tayeh
- June Taylor
- Paul Taylor
- Twyla Tharp
- Jayne Torvill
- Sergio Trujillo
- Dee Dee Wood
