= The Entertainers =

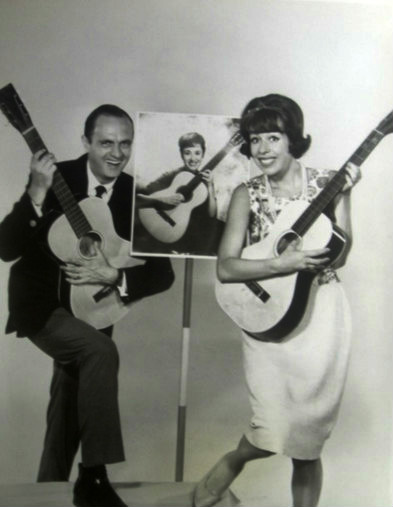
- Newhart and Burnett with a photo of Valente, 1964.
- Genre: Variety show
- Written by: Vincent Bogert; Sydney Zelinka; Tony Webster; Philip Green; Treva Silverman; David Panich; Arnie Rosen; Coleman Jacoby
- Starring: Carol Burnett, Bob Newhart, and Caterina Valente
- Country of origin: United States
- Original language: English
- No. of seasons: 1
- No. of episodes: 26

Production
- Executive producer: Bob Banner
- Producer: Joe Hamilton
- Running time: 60 minutes
- Production companies: Bob Banner Associates, in association with the CBS Television Network

Original release
- Network: CBS
- Release: September 25, 1964 – March 27, 1965

The Entertainers is a one-hour American variety show which aired on CBS from September 25, 1964, through March 27, 1965.

Produced by Joe Hamilton, the series featured three hosts: Hamilton's then-wife Carol Burnett, Bob Newhart, and Caterina Valente. In order to serve as a regular host, it was necessary for Burnett to leave her role in the Broadway musical Fade Out - Fade In, and she was summarily sued by the show's producers for breach of contract, resulting in her return to the musical in February 1965 for what turned out to be its final weeks.

Broadcast weekly from New York, where it was taped Friday evenings at CBS Studio 50 (now the Ed Sullivan Theater), the variety show format was typical of the period. It contained a mix of comedy sketches, musical numbers performed by a regular group of series artists and having one or two guest stars (such as Boris Karloff, Phil Silvers, and Chita Rivera) who hosted, alongside Burnett and Valente each week. It initially aired Friday nights at 8:30pm ET/PT, but after not doing well in the ratings the show was moved, in January 1965, to Saturdays at 9:00pm ET/PT, with the format slightly altered: Newhart and a few of the series' regulars left the cast, Burnett and Valente assumed co-hosting duties for the remainder of the series' run, and new theme music was created.

== Repertory company ==
The repertory company included:

- Art Buchwald
- Ruth Buzzi (joined in 1965)
- Don Crichton
- John Davidson
- Dom DeLuise
- Tessie O'Shea
- The Ernie Flatt Dancers
- The Peter Gennaro Dancers
- The Harry Zimmerman Orchestra

== Notable episodes ==
- 25 September 1964: The show premiered on CBS the same week The Cara Williams Show, The Munsters, The Baileys of Balboa, Gomer Pyle-U.S.M.C., The Reporter, Gilligan's Island, Mr. Broadway, and My Living Doll debuted on the network.
- 13 November 1964: The show abandoned its usual format to present a full-hour documentary about the Beatles' American tour. The Entertainers had premiered the same week the Beatles film A Hard Day's Night opened in theatres.
- 11 December 1964: Thelma Ritter joined series regulars Newhart, Valente, and Dom DeLuise.
- 25 December 1964: Burnett, Valente, Buchwald and Newhart performed in a Christmas special.
- 16 January 1965: Burnett and Valente co-hosted, with Boris Karloff and Chita Rivera as guest stars. The kinescope copy of this episode is the most viewed episode outside of its original broadcast, being widely circulated amongst collectors.
