= List of The Jackie Gleason Show episodes =

The Jackie Gleason Show aired for four seasons on CBS between September 1952 and June 1957. The program did not air during the 1955-1956 season, being replaced by two half-hour programs: a filmed version of its most popular feature, The Honeymooners, and its former summer replacement series, Stage Show. In the fall of 1956, The Jackie Gleason Show returned for one more season, again with the Honeymooners sketches as its main feature, before being revived in 1962.

For descriptions of the Honeymooners sketches within The Jackie Gleason Show, see List of The Honeymooners episodes.

== Season One: 1952–53 ==
No. overall	No. in season	Guest Stars	Honeymooners	Original release date
1	1–01	Louis Armstrong, Eileen Barton, The Mayo Brothers	"The New Bowling Ball" [9:35]	September 20, 1952
Sketches: Poor Soul paints his dog; Reggie Van Gleason is shoe salesman; Art Carney in Truman gag. Musical Numbers: Gleason sings "I Love Girls"; Barton sings "Come Rain or Come Shine" and "You Like?"; singer/trumpeter Armstrong performs "A Kiss to Build a Dream On" and "That's a Plenty." Note: SERIES PREMIERE.
2	1–02	Jimmy Dorsey & his Orchestra, Patti Page, Joan Holloway	"The Turkey" [10:13]	September 27, 1952
Other Sketches: Loudmouth Charlie Bratton and Clem Finch have a rare dime; Reggie Van Gleason in a wrestling match. Musical Numbers: June Taylor Dancers perform to "Another Op'nin, Another Show"; Gleason sings "Who Cares" and dances to "Crazy Rhythm" with Marilyn Taylor; Dorsey & Orchestra play "Struttin' With Some Barbeque" and another number.
3	1–03	Harry James, Teresa Brewer, Elaine Dunn, Tommy Gumina	none.	October 4, 1952
Sketches: Joe the Bartender; Loudmouth Charlie Bratton thinks Clem Finch's wife is cheating on him; Coney Island sketch with whole cast participating in tribute to silent film comedies. Musical Numbers: matador number with James and June Taylor Dancers; trumpeter James and accordionist Gumina duet to "Flight of the Bumblebee"; Brewer sings "I Don't Care" and "Those Roly Poly Eyes"; Dunn dances to "Someone to Watch Over Me."
4	1–04	Nat King Cole, Doretta Morrow, Maria Neglia	"The Lost Baby" [10:05]	October 11, 1952
Other Sketches: Joe the Bartender. Musical Numbers: singer/pianist Cole performs "Walkin' My Baby Back Home" and "Faith Can Move Mountains"; Morrow sings "I Have Dreamed" and "Because You're Mine"; violinist Neglia plays "Flight of the Bumblebee" backed by June Taylor Dancers. Notes: Gleason recognizes his house orchestra leader Ray Bloch's 20 years in conducting; John Lester dubs Gleason the #1 TV comedian of the season.
5	1–05	Morton Downey, Anita Kert Ellis	"The Quiz Show" [11:29]	October 18, 1952
Other Sketches: Loudmouth Charlie Bratton tries to get Clem Finch a raise; Poor Soul and girlfriend get a TV set. Musical Numbers: June Taylor Dancers perform to "Order"; singer/pianist Downey performs "Dear Old Donegal," "My Blue Heaven," "Carolina Moon," and "It's the Same Old Shillelagh."
6	1–06	Richard Tucker	"Halloween Party" [8:52]	October 25, 1952
7	1–07	Ethel Waters, Deems Taylor	"Cold" [7:58]	November 1, 1952
8	1–08	Dick Haymes	"The Pickles" [7:16]	November 8, 1952
9	1–09	Jane Froman	none.	November 15, 1952
Note: Froman appeared because her show this evening was pre-empted for the CBS Television City opening special.
10	1–10	Jane Froman (unconfirmed)	"Jellybeans" [8:27]	November 22, 1952
11	1–11	not available	none.	November 29, 1952
12	1–12	Grantland Rice All-America Team, Neva Jane Langley, Gail Robbins	"The Missing Pair of Pants" [n/a]	December 6, 1952
13	1–13	not available	"Six Months to Live" [13:51]	December 13, 1952
14	1–14	Patricia Morison, Phil Napoleon & his Memphis Five.	"Christmas Party" [42:25]	December 20, 1952
15	1–15	not available	none.	December 27, 1952
16	1–16	not available	"Glow Worm Cleaning" [10:02]	January 3, 1953
17	1–17	not available	none.	January 10, 1953
18	1–18	Peggy Lee	"Alice Plays Cupid" [12:04]	January 17, 1953
19	1–19	The DeMarco Sisters	"Suspense" [10:47]	January 24, 1953
20	1–20	Jeanette MacDonald	"Lost Job" [9:07]	January 31, 1953
21	1–21	not available	none.	February 7, 1953
Note: Gleason absent with guest host filling in (unconfirmed) .
22	1–22	Dick Haymes	none.	February 14, 1953
23	1–23	Toni Arden	"Anniversary Gift" [10:25]	February 21, 1953
Other Sketches: Poor Soul has a date at the roller rink; Reggie Van Gleason's parents think he's slacking off in his duties at the bank. Musical Numbers: Arden sings "Dancing in the Dark" and "Kiss"; June Taylor Dancers perform to "Me and My Shadow" with singing guests.
24	1–24	not available	none.	February 28, 1953
25	1–25	June Christy	"Income Tax" [10:46]	March 7, 1953
26	1–26	Sunny Gale	"Alice's Aunt Ethel" [9:23]	March 14, 1953
Other Sketches: Gleason does two of his established characters. Musical Numbers: June Taylor Dancers perform a St. Patrick's Day routine.
27	1–27	Morton Downey	"What's Her Name?" [7:13]	March 21, 1953
28	1–28	Mel Tormé	"Lunch Box" [9:16]	March 28, 1953
29	1–29	not available	"Easter Hats" [n/a]	April 4, 1953
30	1–30	Johnny Desmond	"Hot Tips" [11:20]	April 11, 1953
31	1–31	Helen Forrest	"Norton Moves In" [12:10]	April 18, 1953
32	1–32	Georgia Gibbs	"Ralph's Diet" [11:39]	April 25, 1953
Other Sketches: Gleason does two of his established characters. Musical Numbers: The June Taylor Dancers perform two numbers.
33	1–33	Mary Mayo	"The Dinner Guest" [9:56]	May 2, 1953
34	1–34	Mary Mayo, Queen Elizabeth Scotch Pipers	"Manager of the Baseball Team" [9:59]	May 9, 1953
Other Sketches: "Miss National Press Photographer."
35	1–35	Teresa Brewer, West Point Glee Club	"Alice's Birthday" [n/a]	May 16, 1953
36	1–36	The Fabulous Dorseys	"The Dorsey Brothers Show" [34:57]	May 23, 1953
Ralph is in charge of the Gotham Bus Company party and he wants to sign Tommy Dorsey and his band and asks Alice to call him. Alice thought he said Jimmy Dorsey with the result that both Tommy and Jimmy show up at the apartment and they allegedly hate each other. The happy ending is Tommy and Jimmy Dorsey's television debut with their combined orchestra. Musical numbers include "Ruby", the theme song from the movie "Ruby Gentry" (1952).
37	1–37	Merv Griffin	none.	May 30, 1953
Sketches: Loudmouth Charlie Bratton & Clem Finch; Joe the Bartender. Musical Numbers: Gleason conducts his four-movement tone poem ballet, "Tawny," including: Dolores Harper, James Riley, Charles Queenan in black street scene "Modern Blues"; Kathryn Lee, Duncan Noble, Davie Lerner in late 18th Century dance number; and Marilyn Taylor, Peter Gladke, Rudy Tone, and others in formal grand finale.
38	1–38	Don Cornell	"The Prowler" [11:12]	June 6, 1953
Other Sketches: Gleason does two of his established characters.
39	1–39	Helen O'Connell	"Guest Speaker" [13:41]	June 13, 1953
40	1–40	Bob Manning, Trini Reyes	none.	June 20, 1953
Sketches: Art Carney and Audrey Meadows appear in sketches.
41	1–41	The Four Aces	"Vacation at Fred's Landing" [31:16]	June 27, 1953
Sketches: Art Carney and Audrey Meadows appear in sketches.
42	1–42	not available	none.	July 4, 1953
Sketches: Cast takes over the show to salute Gleason in season finale; Art Carney and Zamah Cunningham spoof of Arthur Godfrey's popular singing couple, Frank Parker and Marion Marlowe; Jerry Bergen does vaudeville act. Note: SEASON FINALE.

SUMMER REPLACEMENT SERIES: "The Larry Storch Show" took over the timeslot for ten weeks from July 11 to September 12, 1953.

== Season Two: 1953–54 ==
No. overall	No. in season	Guest Stars	Honeymooners	Original release date
43	2–01	not available	"Sprained Thumb" [12:43]	September 19, 1953
Other sketches: Reggie Van Gleason; Joe the Bartender; Loudmouth Charlie Bratton. Musical Numbers: For the show openings this season, Gleason added 7 new girls that he handpicked out of 700. Note: SEASON PREMIERE.
44	2–02	Yogi Berra, Phil Rizzuto, Mickey Mantle, and Hank Bauer of the New York Yankees	"Lucky Number" [16:27]	September 26, 1953
45	2–03	not available	none.	October 3, 1953
Sketches: An actor has not quite made the grade in "The Neighborhood."
46	2–04	not available	"Hot Dog Stand" [35:13]	October 10, 1953
47	2–05	not available	none.	October 17, 1953
Sketches: "Use Your Imagination"; parody of prize fight films; and Gleason does two of his regular characters.
48	2–06	not available	"Two Tickets to the Fight" [10:52]	October 24, 1953
49	2–07	not available	"Halloween Party" [9:22]	October 31, 1953
50	2–08	not available	"Champagne and Caviar" [14:44]	November 7, 1953
51	2–09	not available	"Letter to the Boss" [32:35]	November 14, 1953
52	2–10	not available	none.	November 21, 1953
53	2–11	not available	"Finger Man" [11:51]	November 28, 1953
54	2–12	not available	none.	December 5, 1953
55	2–13	not available	"Santa and the Bookies" [35:02]	December 12, 1953
56	2–14	not available	"Christmas Party" [35:54]	December 19, 1953
57	2–15	Jimmy & Tommy Dorsey & their Orchestra	"New Year's Eve Party" [37:15]	December 26, 1953
Note: Entire program has a New Year's Eve motif and continuing storyline.
46	2–04	Guest Host: Gordon MacRae; Other Guests: Sheila MacRae, Marion Morgan, Connie Sawyer	none.	January 2, 1954
Note: Jackie Gleason is on vacation.
59	2–17	Guest Host: Gordon MacRae; Other guests: Mickey Deems, Connie Sawyer	none.	January 9, 1954
Note: Jackie Gleason is on vacation.
60	2–18	not available	"This is Your Life" [37:43]	January 16, 1954
61	2–19	not available	"Cottage for Sale" [39:42]	January 23, 1954
62	2–20	Martha Fletcher	none.	January 30, 1954
Sketches: Reggie Van Gleason; silent movie parody. Note: Two minutes before the end of the show, Gleason slipped and fell on camera, fracturing his ankle. The stage was slippery due to dry ice used in one of the sketches to simulate steam.
63	2–21	Guest Host: Ed Sullivan	none.	February 6, 1954
Sketches: In "Man Under the Street," the Honeymooners' Ed Norton (played by Art Carney) is interviewed by Ed Sullivan. Note: Jackie Gleason is absent due to injury.
64	2–22	Guest Host: Arthur Godfrey; Other Guests: Robert Q. Lewis	none.	February 13, 1954
Sketches: In "People to People," the Honeymooners' Ed Norton (played by Art Carney) is interviewed at home by Lewis in a take-off of Edward R. Murrow's Person to Person. Note: Jackie Gleason is absent due to injury.
65	2–23	Guest Host: Garry Moore	none.	February 20, 1954
Sketches: Garry Moore and his gang take over the show. Note: Jackie Gleason is absent due to injury.
66	2–24	Guest Host: Red Skelton	none.	February 27, 1954
Note: Jackie Gleason is absent due to injury.
67	2–25	Guest Host: Art Carney	none.	March 6, 1954
Sketches: Carney is featured in two sketches as a pet shop owner and a school teacher. Note: Jackie Gleason is absent due to injury, although he is rumored to make an appearance tonight against doctor's orders.
68	2–26	Guest Host: Eddie Fisher	none.	March 13, 1954
Sketches: Art Carney and Audrey Meadows are featured in two sketches, one of which features Meadows as a successful female executive and Carney as a timid male secretary. Note: Jackie Gleason is absent due to injury.
69	2–27	Guest Host: Jane Froman	none.	March 20, 1954
Note: Jackie Gleason is absent due to injury.
70	2–28	not available	"Lawsuit" [15:08]	March 27, 1954
Note: Jackie Gleason returns for the first time since injuring his leg in the January 30 telecast. His injury is written into tonight's Honeymooners sketch.
71	2–29	not available	"Fortune Teller" [34:51]	April 3, 1954
72	2–30	not available	"The Next Champ" [37:35]	April 10, 1954
73	2–31	not available	"Stand in for Murder" [42:28]	April 17, 1954
Other sketches: Reggie Van Gleason. Note: This episode's Honeymooners sketch ran too long, reportedly prompting CBS to cut away to their next program at 9:00 p.m. EST. Gleason explained the ending of the sketch during the following week's telecast.
74	2–32	none	"Move Uptown" [36:58]	April 24, 1954
Other sketches: none. Musical Numbers: The June Taylor Dancers perform to "I'm Just Wild About Harry"; a trio of young girls sings "The Noodling Rag." Note: During his monologue, Gleason explains the ending of the previous week's Honeymooners sketch which was cut short due to time constraints.
75	2–33	not available	"The Man in the Blue Suit" [34:30]	May 1, 1954
76	2–34	not available	"Hair Raising Tale" [37:31]	May 8, 1954
77	2–35	not available	"What's the Name?" [8:21]	May 15, 1954
Other sketches: Reggie Van Gleason. Note: This week's telecast celebrates Jackie Gleason's 25th anniversary in show business.
78	2–36	not available	"Box Top Kid" [40:27]	May 22, 1954
79	2–37	not available	"Two Men on a Horse" [38:43]	May 29, 1954
80	2–38	none	"Good Buy, Aunt Ethel" [41:44]	June 5, 1954
Other sketches: none. Musical Numbers: The June Taylor Dancers perform to "June is Bustin' Out All Over."
81	2–39	not available	none.	June 12, 1954
Sketches: Loudmouth Charlie Bratton and Clem Finch.
82	2–40	not available	"Vacation at Fred's Landing" [31:00]	June 19, 1954
83	2–41	Margaret Hamilton, Garry Moore	none.	June 26, 1954
Sketches: Gleason and his troupe of performers, including Art Carney, close the show for the summer. Note: SEASON FINALE.

SUMMER REPLACEMENT SERIES: Stage Show took over the timeslot for twelve weeks from July 3 to September 18, 1954.

== Season Three: 1954–55 ==
No. overall	No. in season	Guest Stars	Honeymooners	Original release date
84	3–01	not available	"Ralph's Sweet Tooth" [36:49]	September 25, 1954
Other sketches: none. Note: SEASON PREMIERE. The June Taylor Dancers are doubled from 16 to 32 this season to fill up the stage and take advantage of Gleason's new overhead camera. Three of the four girls who open the show are new, with Betty Ellen (the "And away we go!" girl) remaining.
85	3–02	not available	"Game Called on Account of Marriage" [33:34]	October 2, 1954
86	3–03	Ruby Keeler	none.	October 9, 1954
Sketches: Reggie Van Gleason, the Poor Soul, Mother Fletcher; featuring Art Carney and Zamah Cunningham. Musical Numbers: Keeler does a 1930's style movie musical number with the June Taylor Dancers.
87	3–04	not available	"Love Letter" [38:50]	October 16, 1954
88	3–05	not available	"The People's Choice (Finger Man) " [40:43]	October 23, 1954
89	3–06	not available	"Halloween Party" [n/a]	October 30, 1954
Other sketches: Halloween themed show. Note: Gleason sings "I Just Love Halloween."
90	3–07	Barry Gordon	none.	November 6, 1954
Sketches: Reggie Van Gleason has a twin brother; Loudmouth Charlie Bratton in a music lesson; Joe the Bartender. Musical Numbers: The June Taylor Dancers in hunting gear; 6-year-old Gordon sings "Cecilia" and "I Need You Now."
91	3–08	none	"Battle of the Sexes" [35:45]	November 13, 1954
Other sketches: none.
92	3–09	none	"Teamwork Beat the Clock" [32:27]	November 20, 1954
Other sketches: none.
93	3–10	Pat Harrington, Jr.	"The Brother-in-Law" [34:58]	November 27, 1954
Note: Gleason kicks off his Friendship Trees campaign, a charity that puts Christmas trees in children's hospital wards around the country.
94	3–11	The Portrettes, Look All-American Football Team	none.	December 4, 1954
Sketches: Fenwick Babbitt; Reggie Van Gleason is a detective; Mother Fletcher has a Christmas kit. Musical Numbers: "Little Girl."
95	3–12	none	"Songwriters" [36:48]	December 11, 1954
Other sketches: none.
96	3–13	Bob Manning	"Santa and the Bookies" [31:08]	December 18, 1954
Musical Numbers: The June Taylor Dancers perform to "I've Got My Love to Keep Me Warm"; Manning sings "My Love Song to You."
97	3–14	not available	none.	December 25, 1954
Note: Gleason went on vacation for two weeks after this episode, with Stage Show taking over the timeslot for the January 1 and January 8, 1955 telecasts.
98	3–15	Angel McNally	"Kramden vs. Norton" [34:46]	January 15, 1955
Other sketches: McNally does a child ventriloquist act. Musical Numbers: The June Taylor Dancers perform the opening number.
99	3–16	none	"A Promotion" [39:10]	January 22, 1955
Other sketches: none. Musical Numbers: Gleason new theme song, "My Love Song to You," opens the show.
100	3–17	none	"The Hypnotist" [38:43]	January 29, 1955
Other sketches: none.
101	3–18	none	"Cupid" [39:37]	February 5, 1955
Other sketches: none.
102	3–19	none	"A Little Man Who Wasn't There" [39:25]	February 12, 1955
Other sketches: none. Musical Numbers: Gleason starts the show with a Valentine's Day number, "Love is Sweeping the Country."
103	3–20	none	"Hero" [40:02]	February 19, 1955
Other sketches: none. Musical Numbers: The June Taylor Dancers opening number.
104	3–21	none	"The Great Jewel Robbery" [37:50]	February 26, 1955
Other sketches: none.
105	3–22	none	"Peacemaker" [37:19]	March 5, 1955
Other sketches: none. Note: Gleason goes on vacation for two weeks after this episode, with Stage Show taking over the timeslot for the March 12 and March 19, 1955 telecasts.
106	3–23	none	"The Adoption" [37:20]	March 26, 1955
Other Sketches: none. Musical Numbers: The June Taylor Dancers perform to either "Another Op'nin', Another Show" or "I Never Knew," depending on source. Note: At show's end, Gleason recognizes Meadows and Carney for their recent Emmy wins.
107	3–24	none	"Stars Over Flatbush" [37:15]	April 2, 1955
Other sketches: none.
108	3–25	none	"One Big Happy Family" [37:53]	April 9, 1955
Other sketches: none. Musical Numbers: The June Taylor Dancers perform to an Easter-theme number, "I'm Puttin' All My Eggs in One Basket."
109	3–26	none	"A Weighty Problem" [37:56]	April 16, 1955
Other Sketches: none.
110	3–27	none	"Boys and Girls Together" [36:49]	April 23, 1955
Other sketches: none.
111	3–28	Jack Benny	"Principle of the Thing" [34:28]	April 30, 1955
Other sketches: none. Note 1: Benny appears in the Honeymooners sketch, and he returns at the end of the show to help Gleason promote his appearance on The Jack Benny Program the following night. Note 2: Gleason went on vacation the following week, with Stage Show taking over the timeslot for the May 7, 1955 telecast.
112	3–29	none	"Songs and Witty Sayings" [39:42]	May 14, 1955
Other sketches: none.
113	3–30	none.	"Letter to the Boss" [31:28]	May 21, 1955
Other sketches: none.
114	3–31	not available	none.	May 28, 1955
Sketches: Reggie Van Gleason has a hot dog stand in Central Park. Musical Numbers: Three different Gleason bands perform, including the number "Who Cares?"; The June Taylor Dancers play the glockenspiel.
115	3–32	not available	"Stand in for Murder" [41:58]	June 4, 1955
Musical Numbers: The June Taylor Dancers perform to "I'm Just Wild About Harry."
116	3–33	not available	none.	June 11, 1955
Sketches: Joe the Bartender; Loudmouth Charlie Batton; Reggie Van Gleason.
117	3–34	not available	none.	June 18, 1955
Sketches: Art Carney with Gleason regulars and staff in a rest house sketch. Musical Numbers: Gleason does song-and-dance number with Carney and Meadows; June and Marilyn Taylor do a dance duet; June Taylor Dancers and Gleason's male staff do a "Flora-dora" number; a barbershop quartet performs; Betty Ellen (the "And away we go!" girl) performs a solo. Note: SEASON FINALE, including Gleason's entire cast and members of the crew.

SUMMER REPLACEMENT SERIES: America's Greatest Bands took over the timeslot for fourteen weeks from June 25 to September 24, 1955.

== Season Four: 1956–57 ==
No. overall	No. in season	Guest Stars	Honeymooners	Original release date
118	4–01	William Boyd, Charles Laughton, Peter Lorre, ZaSu Pitts, Edward G. Robinson, Rudy Vallee	none.	September 29, 1956
Sketches: Poor Soul; Reggie Van Gleason; Joe the Bartender.
119	4–02	not available	none.	October 6, 1956
Sketches: Loudmouth Charlie Bratton and Clem Finch; Fenwick Babbitt; Mother Fletcher.
120	4–03	not available	"Double Anniversary Party" [13:11]	October 13, 1956
Other sketches: Reggie Van Gleason; Joe the Bartender.
121	4–04	not available	"The Check-up" [10:08]	October 20, 1956
122	4–05	not available	"Forgot to Register" [13:41]	October 27, 1956
123	4–06	not available	"Expectant Father" [16:05]	November 3, 1956
124	4–07	not available	"Goodnight Sweet Prince" [15:33]	November 10, 1956
Other sketches: Gleason reads Arch Oboler's new poem, "A Prayer for the Atomic Age."
125	4–08	not available	"Two Family Car" [17:36]	November 17, 1956
126	4–09	not available	"Love Letter" [37:07]	November 24, 1956
127	4–10	various	none.	December 1, 1956
Note: Gleason cancelled the regular show tonight in favor of a 60-minute tribute to Tommy Dorsey, featuring friends and associates of the late bandleader.
128	4–11	not available	"Finders Keepers" [36:29]	December 8, 1956
Other sketches: none.
129	4–12	not available	"Catch a Star" [39:31]	December 15, 1956
Other sketches: none.
130	4–13	not available	none.	December 22, 1956
Sketches: Gleason's Christmas show this season features the Poor Soul who is befriended by a kind soul and taken to a fantasy land; several of Gleason's other regular characters appear.
131	4–14	Guest Host: Art Carney; Other Guests: Charlton Heston, Fred Waring, Sammy Davis, Jr.	none.	December 29, 1956
Note: Gleason is on vacation this week.
132	4–15	Guest Host: Art Carney; Other Guests: Gordon MacRae, Roberta Sherwood, Woody Herman, The Goofers	none.	January 5, 1957
None: Gleason is on vacation this week.
133	4–16	Guest Host: Eddie Cantor; Guest Hosts: George Burns & Gracie Allen, Edward R. Murrow, Eddie Fisher, Marilyn Cantor, Connie Russell, George Jessel	none.	January 12, 1957
Sketches: "At 65" - The entire show is dedicated to Eddie Cantor celebrating his 50 years in show business; Cantor does his old act with Burns & Allen; Cantor is interviewed by Murrow; sketches scripted by Cantor himself. Musical Numbers: Cantor sings several songs, solo and with his daughter, Marilyn; performances on film of Al Jolson and Will Rogers. Note: Gleason is on vacation this week.
134	4–17	not available	"My Fair Landlord" [36:17]	January 19, 1957
135	4–18	Jonathan Winters, Johnny Cash	none.	January 26, 1957
Sketches: Reggie Van Gleason in a quiz show parody; Poor Soul babysits an infant. Musical Numbers: The June Taylor Dancers in a military number; Cash sings "I Walk the Line."
136	4–19	none	"Away We Go" [49:12]	February 2, 1957
Other sketches: none. Note: Entire show devoted to the first in a series of Honeymooners musical shows.
137	4–20	none	"Plastered in Paris" [49:02]	February 9, 1957
Other sketches: none. Note: Entire show devoted to the second in a series of Honeymooners musical shows.
138	4–21	none	"Behind the Iron Curtain" [48:04]	February 16, 1957
Other sketches: none. Note: Entire show devoted to the third in a series of Honeymooners musical shows.
139	4–22	none	"When in Rome" [48:01]	February 23, 1957
Other sketches: none. Note: Entire show devoted to the fourth in a series of Honeymooners musical shows.
140	4–23	none	"Curse of the Kramdens" [48:32]	March 2, 1957
Other sketches: none. Note: Entire show devoted to the fifth in a series of Honeymooners musical shows.
141	4–24	none	"Mad Dogs and Englishmen" [49:02]	March 9, 1957
Other sketches: none. Note: Entire show devoted to the sixth in a series of Honeymooners musical shows.
142	4–25	Guest Host: Kate Smith; Other Guests: Bobby Van, Pat Rooney, Sr., Gene Sheldon, Jonathan Winters	none.	March 16, 1957
Sketches/Musical Numbers: Vaudeville tribute to the Palace Theatre emceed by Kath Smith; Van sings George M. Cohan tunes; Rooney dances a soft shoe to "Rosie O'Grady"; Sheldon sews his fingers together; Winters does a satiric sketch. Note: Gleason is on vacation this week.
143	4–26	Guest Host: Kathryn Grayson; Other Guests: Sarah Vaughan, Dick Haymes, Bobby Hackett	none.	March 23, 1957
Musical Numbers: Entire show dedicated to musical variety in the style of Gleason's Stage Show program; Vaughan sings "But Not For Me" and "How High the Moon"; Haymes sings "What's New"; Haymes and Grayson sing "True Love"; trumpeter Hackett solos with "Poor Butterfly." Note: Gleason is on vacation this week.
144	4–27	Guest Host: Hugh O'Brian; Other Guests: Emmett Kelly, Felix Adler, Happy Kellems	none.	March 30, 1957
Note: Gleason is on vacation this week.
145	4–28	none	"Framed in Spain" [52:27]	April 6, 1957
Other sketches: none. Note: Entire show devoted to the seventh in a series of Honeymooners musical shows.
146	4–29	none	"I Remember Mau Au" [50:35]	April 13, 1957
Other sketches: none. Note: Entire show devoted to the eighth in a series of Honeymooners musical shows.
147	4–30	Jaye P. Morgan	none.	April 20, 1957
Sketches: Reggie Van Gleason.
148	4–31	Joey Adams, Al Kelly, Theresa Brewer, Russell Swann	none.	April 27, 1957
Sketches: Fenwick Babbitt plays assistant to magician Swann, who does his "French Guillotine" trick. First of three segments in which the Honeymooners' Ed Norton (played by Art Carney) is interviewed by Jackie Gleason. Musical Numbers: Brewer sings several tunes, including "Empty Arms."
149	4–32	June Carter	none.	May 4, 1957
Sketches: Reggie Van Gleason; Gleason and Carney in a special sketch. Second of three segments in which the Honeymooners' Ed Norton (played by Art Carney) is interviewed by Jackie Gleason.
150	4–33	Morey Amsterdam, Jerry Copper, The Sciplina Chimps	"Six Months to Live" [n/a]	May 11, 1957
Other sketches: Reggie Van Gleason.
151	4–34	not available	none.	May 18, 1957
152	4–35	Jane Morgan, Jack E. Leonard	none.	May 25, 1957
Sketches: Joe the Bartender; Poor Soul goes to the movies. Third of three segments in which the Honeymooners' Ed Norton (played by Art Carney) is interviewed by Jackie Gleason. Musical Numbers: The June Taylor Dancers perform to "The Most Beautiful Girl in the World"; Morgan sings "It's Not for Me to Say."
153	4–36	Sammy Kaye, Rose Marie	"Manager of the Baseball Team" [10:45]	June 1, 1957
154	4–37	Guest Host: Johnnie Ray; Other Guests: Larry Griswold, Louis Jordan, Peggy Lee, Jimmy Nelson	none.	June 8, 1957
Note: Gleason is on vacation this week.
155	4–38	Guest Host: Vic Damone; Other Guests: Peggy Lee, Dave Barry, Betty Kean & Lew Parker	none.	June 15, 1957
Sketches: Kean and Parker fight for rights to a phone booth. Musical Numbers: Damone sings "Cheek to Cheek"; Lee sings "Don't Get Around Much Anymore"; Damone and Lee duet on "You're the Cream in My Coffee" and special number "They All Played This Piano." Note: Gleason is on vacation this week.
156	4–39	Guest Host: Peggy Lee; Other Guests: Tony Bennett, The Treniers, Jack E. Leonard	none.	June 22, 1957
Note: Gleason is on vacation this week, the final show of the series.

SUMMER REPLACEMENT SERIES: Filmed repeats of The Jimmy Durante Show (originally aired on NBC) took over the timeslot for the summer, beginning June 29, 1957.
