= Charles Klapow =

American choreographer

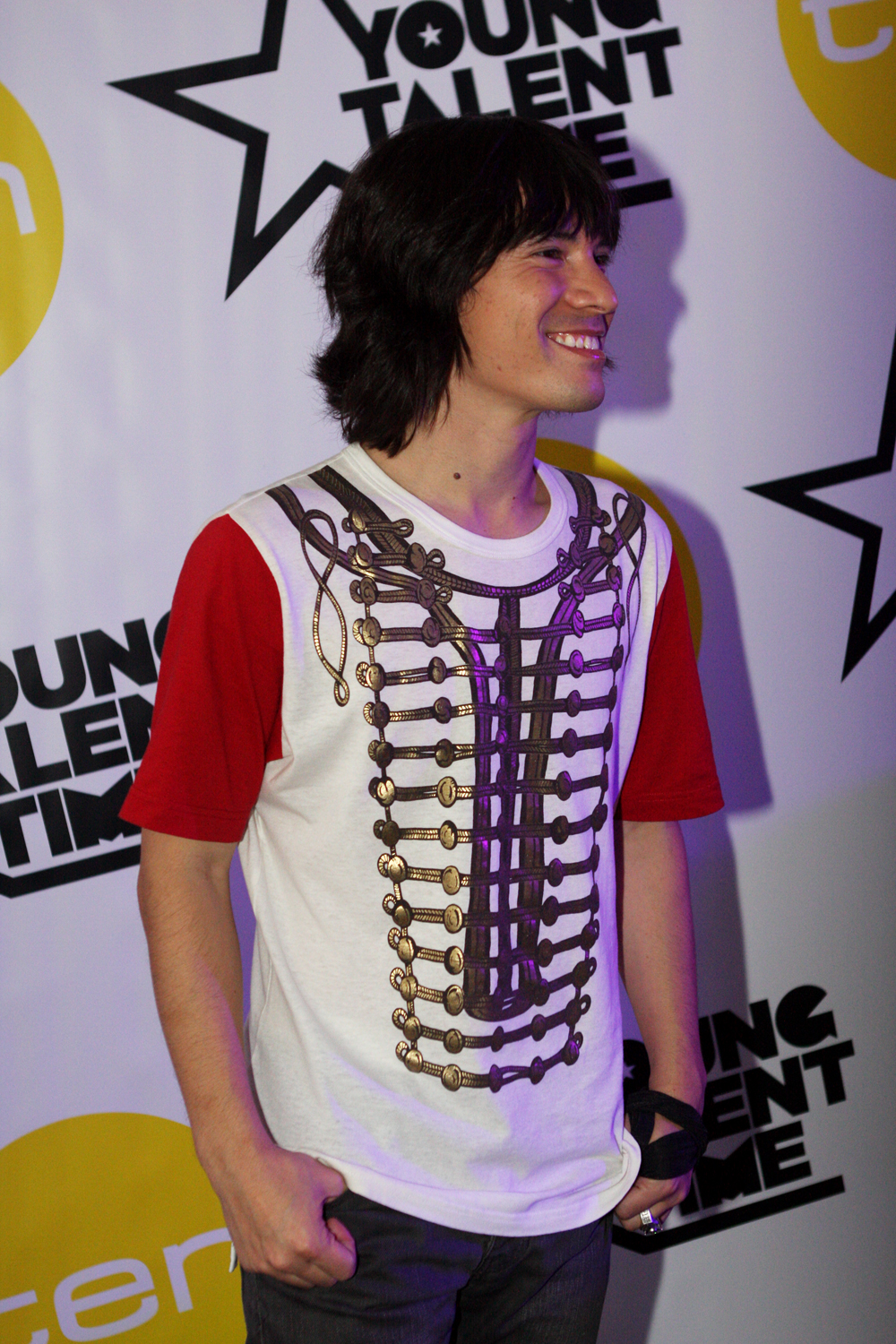
- Klapow at the Young Talent Time Media Event, Luna Park Sydney, 2012
- Born: July 5, 1980 (age 45)
- Occupations: Choreographer, dance instructor, dancer

Charles "Chucky" Klapow (born July 5, 1980) is an American choreographer and dance instructor who has performed and choreographed for various performers and several television and stage productions. He is also known for his teachings on the mental approach to dance.

== Life and career ==
Klapow was born to a Filipino mother, and a European-American father. Klapow began his dancing career aged 12, dancing for Patti LaBelle, Celine Dion, Sheila E., Salt-N-Pepa, Melissa Etheridge, and others in an all-star concert for the Pediatric AIDS Foundation. This included a dancing spot in the Paula Abdul music video "Zip-A-Dee-Doo-Dah". By the time he was 15, Charles was an assistant to choreographer and mentor Marguerite Derricks. He assisted Marguerite and danced in Austin Powers: International Man of Mystery (1997), 3rd Rock from the Sun, Fame L.A., among others. Charles created a dance company with partner Wade Robson in the mid-1990s called L.A. Images.

In the fall of 2000, Klapow started choreographing for the Swedish pop group the A*Teens. He was their choreographer for music videos including "Floorfiller", "Halfway Around The World", "Sugar Rush", "Can't Help Falling In Love", and "I Promised Myself" as well as their tour director and choreographer from 2001 to 2003. These tours took Charles to Germany, Sweden and all over the United States, with additional spot dates in Mexico, Spain, Russia, and Denmark.

Ever since the inaugural season of the WNBA Charles has been a choreographer for the "Sparkids", the hip-hop squad which performs at all Los Angeles Sparks home games. In 2005, Klapow became co-director of the squad under the direction of Christy Buss, and he assumed most of the choreography duties for the Sparkids during the 2005 and 2006 seasons.

Klapow was brought on board by Kenny Ortega (Dirty Dancing choreographer) to help choreograph High School Musical (2006), a Disney Channel Original Movie, with Bonnie Story. Very quickly, Ortega became another mentor to Klapow as they quickly developed a working chemistry together. Klapow served with Ortega and Story as a choreographer for the film's sequels, High School Musical 2 and High School Musical 3: Senior Year. He also had a role in all High School Musical movies as a student and member of the school basketball team as well. He also went on to choreograph the stage and ice tours.

In 2009, Klapow was asked by Ortega to be the choreographer for the 2011 movie musical remake of Footloose starring Kenny Wormald and Julianne Hough, which Ortega directed, but Klapow turned it down so that he could fulfil his dreams of dancing with Michael Jackson on his comeback tour in London, which was announced in March.

Ironically, Ortega was set to be the tour director of the shows. Klapow was one of twelve dancers picked for Jackson's This Is It shows at the O2 Arena in London, which was set to begin July 13, 2009, through March 6, 2010, and produced by AEG Live. However, on June 25, 2009, just eighteen days before the first show, Jackson died of cardiac arrest. AEG Live cancelled the whole residency.

On July 7, 2009, Klapow took part in the Michael Jackson memorial service at the Staples Center in Los Angeles where days before Jackson's death, Klapow, Jackson and the whole This Is It crew rehearsed in preparations for the London concerts at the O2 Arena. Klapow took part in the performance of "Will You Be There" performed by Jennifer Hudson, where he, and the original eleven This Is It dancers were back-up dancers for the performance. It is said that this performance was how Jackson was set to perform the song at his London concerts. Ortega was the director of the memorial service.

Klapow recently finished his stint as a judge in the Australian TV show Young Talent Time with Australian singer Tina Arena. On July 6, 2011, Klapow choreographed Ricky and Ryan's Dance on So You Think You Can Dance.

== Selected filmography ==
Year	Film	Role	Notes
2006	High School Musical	Choreographer & basketball team member	Released
2006	Cheetah Girls 2	Choreographer	Released
2007	High School Musical 2	Choreographer & basketball team member	Released
2008	High School Musical 3: Senior Year	Choreographer & basketball team member	Released
2009	Michael Jackson's This Is It	Himself	Released
2010	Dancing Ninja	Choreographer	Released
2012	Young Talent Time	Judge	Broadcast Now
2016	The Rolling Stones: Havana Moon	Choreographer	Released
2021	Grace Gaustad BLKBX	Choreographer	Released

== Awards ==
- 2006 - Emmy Award for Outstanding Choreography for "High School Musical" along with Kenny Ortega and Bonnie Story.
- 2007 - Choreography Media Honors Award for "High School Musical" along with Kenny Ortega and Bonnie Story.
- 2007 - Outstanding Contribution to Dance Award from the Tremaine Dance Conventions
- 2008 - Choreography Media Honors Award for "High School Musical 2" along with Kenny Ortega and Bonnie Story.
- 2008 - Emmy Award nomination for Outstanding Choreography for "High School Musical 2" along with Kenny Ortega and Bonnie Story.
- 2009 - Astaire Awards nomination for Best Film Choreographer for "High School Musical 3: Senior Year" shared with Kenny Ortega and Bonnie Story.
- 2012 - World Dance Award nomination for Outstanding Choreography Concert/Live Performance with Renee Roca
- 2015 - World Choreography Award for Outstanding Choreography Digital Format along with Paula Abdul, Renee Richie and Nakul Dev Mahajan.
- 2016 - Outstanding Alumni Award from the Tremaine Dance Conventions
