= Fade Out – Fade In =

1964 musical

- Original cast recording
- Music: Jule Styne
- Lyrics: Betty Comden; Adolph Green
- Book: Betty Comden; Adolph Green
- Productions: 1964 Broadway; 1965 Australia

Fade Out – Fade In is a musical with a book and lyrics by Betty Comden and Adolph Green and music by Jule Styne. The story involves the movie industry in the 1930s. It starred Carol Burnett, returning to the Broadway stage for the first time in four years.

Comden and Green, who tackled the problems Hollywood players faced when the film industry transitioned from silent movies to sound films in Singin' in the Rain, now turn to Hollywood in the 1930s. The show spoofs some of the great film stars of the era, such as Shirley Temple and Bill "Bojangles" Robinson, and the character L.Z. Governor is based on MGM honcho Louis B. Mayer, known for his roving eye for pretty starlets and deep-seated nepotism.

== Productions ==
The musical opened on Broadway on May 26, 1964 at the Mark Hellinger Theatre, and closed on April 17, 1965, after 274 performances and six previews. Directed by George Abbott and choreographed by Ernest Flatt, the cast included Carol Burnett as Hope Springfield, Dick Patterson as Rudolf, Lou Jacobi as Lionel Z. Governor, Jack Cassidy as Byron Prong, and Tina Louise as Gloria Currie. Cassidy was nominated for the Tony Award for Best Featured Actor in a Musical. Dick Shawn replaced Cassidy in February 1965.

Excellent reviews led to a box-office bonanza, and in its early weeks the show consistently out-grossed other current musicals Hello, Dolly! and Funny Girl. Howard Taubman, in his review for The New York Times, praised the direction ("gusto"), the performers ("exuberant"), some production numbers ("vivacious") and an occasional bright line, concluding that "Fade Out-Fade In spreads enough good cheer to suggest that it will be around for quite a while." He also praised Burnett's "amiable zest" and "genial comic impudence."

The production faced its first opening night cast change when Tina Louise left the production in June 1964. CBS bought out her contract so she could appear in the television show Gilligan's Island.

Burnett was sidelined due to a serious neck injury sustained in a taxi accident in July 1964. The production temporarily shut down for one week starting on July 27, 1964, then reopened with Betty Hutton in the lead. After recuperating, Burnett returned to the show, but left shortly afterwards to participate in The Entertainers, a television variety show that her husband Joe Hamilton was producing. Burnett announced in October 1964 that she was leaving the show to have therapy, and the producers announced that they would try to find a replacement. Mitzie Welch went on for Burnett, but in November 1964, the producers announced that the show would close until Burnett was able to return. When the show's producers threatened a breach-of-contract lawsuit, Burnett returned on February 15, 1965. According to Steven Suskin, the show was then "a hard sell" and during the hiatus, several other musicals had opened (Fiddler on the Roof and Golden Boy), and the show did not regain its momentum. Finally, the financial losses sustained during Burnett's two absences proved to be insurmountable, and the production closed. An original cast recording was released by ABC Records (then known as ABC Paramount), whose parent company, The American Broadcasting Companies, Inc., co-produced the show. Universal Music Group, ABC Records' eventual successor, re-released the cast album on CD in 2003 on its Decca Broadway imprint.

When Burnett created her television variety series in 1967, she hired Fade Out – Fade In choreographer Flatt and lead dancer Don Crichton to join the creative team.

=== Australian Production ===
The Australian production presented by Tivoli Circuit opened at the Tivoli Theatre, Sydney on February 20, 1965, followed by a season at Tivoli Theatre, Melbourne from June 3, 1965.

Sheila Smith starred as Hope Springfield, with H.F. Green as L. Z. Governor, and John Stratton as Byron Prong.

Alex Palmero served as Director & Choreographer. Angus Winneke designed the costumes, with Miss Smith's costumes by Robert White Pty. Ltd. and fur by leading Sydney furrier Cornelius of Sydney.

=== Other Productions ===
Porchlight Music Theatre presented Fade Out-Fade In as a part of "Porchlight Revisits" in which they stage three forgotten musicals per year. It was in Chicago, Illinois in May 2014.

== Plot synopsis ==
=== Act One ===
The show opens in the present. As Hollywood tourists mill around him, tour guide Byron Prong (Jack Cassidy), a faded star, reminisces as he sings about the good old days in "Oh Those Thirties." Recalling the now legendary Lila Tremaine, the old man's memory slips back to the first day she came to Hollywood . . . Fade Out . . .

Fade In . . . Hope Springfield (Carol Burnett), pulled from the number five position in a New York City chorus line and sent to Hollywood by FFF Studios, headed by L. Z. Governor (Lou Jacobi), arrives at the studio gates. Posing for publicity photos and reflecting upon her days a theatre usher and her burning ambition to be a star, she sings "It's Good To Be Back Home" - the home of her dreams.

After leaving instructions in New York to ship the number five chorus girl to Hollywood and give her the star buildup. L. Z. Governor had sailed for Europe. In the executive dining room of FFF Studios, his six vice-president nephews are waiting to meet the girl their uncle has written them about. As they wait, the nephews agree that their uncle has effectively bound them together in the brotherhood of "Fear." Hope Springfield enters and all the nephews but one accept her at face value. The dissenter is Rudolph (Dick Patterson), who insists she's just not his uncle's type - she's too wholesome. Calling Byron Prong, the studio's leading male star, to the room, Ralph Governor (Mitchell Jason), the number four nephew who aspires to his uncle's position, informs Prong that he will appear in a new film opposite Hope Springfield. Prong, expecting Ginger Rogers in the role, objects. Ralph applies a touch of blackmail, and Prong reluctantly agrees, joining in a chorus of "Fear."

In the wardrobe department, Hope is clad, by mistake, in little more than an endless string of beads. Rudolph, who sees her as a girl-next-door type, can't accept her as a femme fatale, but Hope, inspired by her burlesque costume, tries to convince him of her fatal allure by belting out "Call Me Savage," as Rudolph protests. When Rudolph leaves, Hope marvels at how "The Usher From The Mezzanine" will soon be a star on the silver screen with millions of other ushers watching her. While the ambitious Ralph pulls all stops to finish the film, The Fiddler and the Fighter, hoping to impress his uncle, L. Z. Governor is undergoing psychoanalysis in Vienna. His analysis discloses a deep-rooted fear that nephew number four (Ralph) will usurp his position, and his anxiety has created his inability to say the number four. He invariably skips from three to five in his conversation.

Back on the Hollywood set, the final scenes are being filmed. Hope and Byron join in the production ballad "I'm With You." L. Z. has returned to Hollywood, and the nephews are due in the dining room for the screening of the new movie. Byron enters, voicing petty complaints, and when Ralph makes a disparaging remark about his appearance, Byron, possessed of a monumental ego, sings "My Fortune Is My Face". L. Z. and the nephews enter and L. Z. telephones his new discovery in her dressing room to say that he has changed her name to Lila Tremaine. The projectionist starts the film, and the nephews are stunned when L. Z. leaps to his feet shouting that it's the wrong girl on the screen. It suddenly dawns on him that, because he couldn't say the number four, he had said five instead, and Hope was packed off to Hollywood by mistake. Firing Ralph for causing his psychological block and for completing the movie with the wrong girl, L. Z. replaces him with Rudolph, giving him instructions to burn the film and get rid of Hope.

Unaware of the turn of events, the former Hope Springfield, now "Lila Tremaine," is ecstatic with the name change and tries the new one on for size, singing about great stars who couldn't have made it big using their real names . . . Fade Out . . .

=== Act Two ===
Fade In . . . Her Hollywood bubble exploded, Lila Tremaine is again just plain Hope Springfield, standing in front of the towering FFF gates - only this time she's an unwelcome outsider. With a train ticket and two weeks salary in her hand, she steadfastly refuses to give up her dream. "Go Home Train" is her farewell to the train that will leave - but without her. The FFF Studio wardrobe department is again fitting a new star - Gloria Currie (Tina Louise), the chorus girl originally intended by L. Z. for the star treatment. Gloria (the new Lila Tremaine) is about to embark upon the new version of The Fiddler and the Fighter. L. Z. is as dazzled by her as when he first spotted her in the chorus line. Byron, after refusing to remake the picture, meets the gorgeous new star and promptly changes his mind. He apologizes, and with L Z., the new Lila and the nephews, vows to work in "Close Harmony."

Hope has been working at various jobs to maintain herself in Hollywood, but she's been plagued by bad luck. No matter what her job - manicurist, waitress, usher - L. Z. Governor consistently shows up, and just as consistently, has her fired. She is reduced to tramping the sidewalk with a sandwich board, dressed as Shirley Temple, advertising a school to groom other potential Shirleys. Lou (Tiger Haynes), a former co-worker at the studio, is pounding the same beat, advertising dancing lessons. Although fortune is currently frowning upon them, they sing and dance (as Shirley Temple and Bill Bojangles Robinson) "You Mustn't Be Discouraged." At the close of the song, Rudolph, who's been searching for Hope, finds her and confesses his love.

L. Z. still has problems. He's imported his Viennese psychoanalyst and as they discuss the movie mogul's emotional status, L. Z. explains that he's at "The Dangerous Age." He's in love with Gloria. Exploring the reasons for his restless nights, he reviews his recurring nightmare, in which he's constantly frustrated in his pursuit of her. In his dreams, Gloria, dancing a ballet with assorted satyrs and wood nymphs, always manages to elude "L. Z. in Quest of His Youth," and each time L. Z. thinks he has her within his grasp, Hope Springfield pops up instead.

Emoting before the cameras, Byron and Gloria wind up their film in a big finale. Byron is finally successful in getting a song in the picture that he feels is a perfect showcase for his magnificent voice, and he happily sings "My Heart is Like a Violin," and then, with the ensemble, sings the title song, "The Fiddler and the Fighter." Rudolph has sneaked Hope onto the set as an extra. Grateful for his friendship and kindness, Hope has fallen in love with him, and together they sing the show's title song, "Fade Out - Fade In."

It's now preview night for L. Z,'s new picture. It develops that Rudolph, contrary to his uncle's instructions, had not burned the original film starring Hope as Lila Tremaine. Instead, he stole the new one. and replaced it with Hope's version, which is shown on the screen. The audience loves it, L. Z. raves about Hope's performance, and she is reinstated as a star. At a ceremony held to place her smile in the cement at Grauman's Chinese Theatre, Hope's luck runs true to form. A star-studded crowd is gathered in front of the theatre, as Hope, now Mrs. Rudolph Governor, in a glamorous fur and evening gown, steps up to the cement, stoops and places her face in it - and, as the curtain falls, is struggling in vain to free herself . . .

. . . Fade Out . . .

== Song list ==
Act I

- "The Thirties"
- "It's Good to Be Back Home"
- "Fear"
- "Call Me Savage"
- "The Usher from the Mezzanine"
- "I'm with You"
- "The Usher from the Mezzanine" (Reprise)
- "My Fortune Is My Face"
- "Lila Tremaine"

Act 2

- "Go Home Train"
- "Close Harmony"
- "You Mustn't Be Discouraged"
- "The Dangerous Age"
- "L.Z. in Quest of His Youth"
- "The Fiddler and the Fighter"
- "Fade Out – Fade In"

The music for "Call Me Savage" was used two years later as "Witches Brew" in the musical Hallelujah, Baby!

== Awards and nominations ==
=== Original Broadway production ===
Year	Award	Category	Nominee	Result
1965	Tony Award	Best Performance by a Featured Actor in a Musical	Jack Cassidy	Nominated

== See also ==
- Fade Out – Fade In Original Broadway Cast Recording, compact disc released by Decca USA, May 2003, liner notes by Peter Filichia
