= Bonnie Story =

American choreographer (born 1959)

Bonnie Story (born March 18, 1959) is an American dancer and choreographer known for her work in film, television and live performance. She choreographed all three films in the High School Musical series, collaborating with Kenny Ortega and Charles Klapow, and shared the 2006 Primetime Emmy Award for Outstanding Choreography for the first film.

Her career also includes co-choreographing the opening and closing ceremonies of the 2002 Winter Olympics, work on So You Think You Can Dance and involvement in the development of Cirque du Soleil's Viva Elvis.

== Career ==
Story trained in ballet with Carolyn Barnett, Ben Lokey, Teri Port, Sonia Arova and Thor Sutowski.

Her large-scale event work included serving as a co-choreographer for the opening and closing ceremonies of the 2002 Winter Olympics. She was also associate artistic director of Odyssey Dance Theatre.

Her film work included choreography for all three films in the High School Musical series, working with Kenny Ortega and Charles Klapow throughout the trilogy. For High School Musical 3: Senior Year, the production used more than 80 principal and featured dancers, with choreography encompassing styles including ballroom and break dancing. Story, Ortega and Klapow shared the 2006 Primetime Emmy Award for Outstanding Choreography for High School Musical and received another nomination for High School Musical 2 in 2008.

Story's other work in 2008 included co-choreographing the MTV television film The American Mall with director Shawn Ku. Reviewing the film for the Los Angeles Times, Robert Lloyd praised their staging of its large musical numbers.

She later helped develop the Cirque du Soleil production Viva Elvis.

By August 2011, Story and the Treehouse Athletic Club were holding auditions in Draper, Utah, for Expansions, a program intended to prepare dancers for professional or company work.

The following year, she choreographed the musical Loving the Silent Tears.

Her later film credits included choreography for the 2016 motion-picture remake of the musical Saturday's Warrior.

== Personal life ==
Story began dancing at approximately five years old after watching her older sister's classes. Her mother played piano for the dance school.

Story has five children. Her daughter Kelli Baker was a contestant on So You Think You Can Dance (season 4).

== Filmography ==
Year	Title	Role	Notes
2002	Opening and closing ceremonies for the 2002 Winter Olympics	Co-choreographer	
2004	Pixel Perfect	Choreographer	Disney Channel Original Movie
2006	High School Musical	Choreographer	Disney Channel Original Movie
2007	American Pastime	Choreographer	
2007	HSM2: Rehearsal Cam	Herself/choreographer	Video documentary short
2007	HSM2: Anatomy of a Dance Number	Herself/choreographer	Video documentary short
2007	High School Musical 2	Choreographer	Disney Channel Original Movie
2008	The American Mall	Choreographer	Television film
2008	High School Musical 3: Senior Year	Choreographer	
2008	Lock and Roll Forever	Choreographer	
2008–2014	So You Think You Can Dance	Herself/choreographer	Four episodes
2009	HSM3: Prom-The Night of Nights	Herself	Video documentary short
2013	The Man Behind the Throne	Herself	Documentary
2013	Dear Dumb Diary	Assistant choreographer	
2013–2015	Rachel & The TreeSchoolers	Choreographer/director	Seven episodes
2014	Signing Time! Christmas	Choreographer	
2016	Saturday's Warrior	Choreographer	
