= Dee Dee Wood =

American choreographer (1927–2023)

Audrey Wood Breaux (née Donella; June 7, 1927 – April 26, 2023), better known as Dee Dee Wood, was an American choreographer. She was best known for her work on musical films of the 1960s and 1970s, especially for The Sound of Music, one of the highest-grossing musicals of all time.

== Biography ==
Audrey Wood Donella was born in Boston, Massachusetts on June 7, 1927. Most of her well-known work was in collaboration with Marc Breaux, both in films and for television. Wood and Breaux were married in 1955 and were later divorced.

Wood first appeared as a dancer on Broadway in Can-Can in 1953, and worked as an Assistant to Michael Kidd on L'il Abner (1956) and Destry Rides Again (1959) and was the choreographer (with Breaux) for Do Re Mi (1960).

From 1964 to 1970, Wood and Breaux were the choreographers for the legendary weekly musical revue "The Hollywood Palace." It was from working with Dick Van Dyke on "Palace" that the married duo got their start in film musicals. The famous TV comedian recommended them for Mary Poppins with Julie Andrews; they received glowing reviews for the innovative "Step In Time" number where chimney sweeps dance across London rooftops.

Wood and Breaux continued their success with the choreography for The Sound Of Music. Wood and her partner had several challenges: adapting the stage's dance numbers to a wide range of Salzberg locations; working with seven child actors (six under the age of 13) and being limited to using only arrangements from the original stage musical as specified by Rodgers and Hammerstein contract. Wood developed a traditional Austrian folk dance, the Ländler, for Julie Andrews's Maria and Christopher Plummer's Captain von Trapp, in such a way that the actors, wordlessly, grow closer and closer until, as Wood put it, "we know, and they know, that they love each other."

Wood choreographed other popular film musicals, including Chitty-Chitty-Bang-Bang again with Dick Van Dyke, and Beaches with Bette Midler.

As her work gravitated toward television, Wood won an Emmy nomination in 1975 for her choreography on the TV special of Cher. Wood also discovered a special ability for choreographing live TV spectaculars, such as Super Bowl halftime shows and the Opening Ceremony of the 1984 Olympics held in Los Angeles, which earned her another Emmy nomination in choreography.

In 1987, Wood won the Emmy for Outstanding Achievement in Choreography for ABC's "Liberty Weekend 1986 - Closing Ceremonies," commemorating the 100th anniversary of the Statue of Liberty, with its glorious fireworks over New York Harbor.

Wood, along with her partner Breaux, were honored with a Lifetime Achievement Award in 1998 at the American Choreographers award ceremonies.

Wood later lived in Cave Creek, Arizona, where she died on April 26, 2023, at the age of 95.

== Filmography ==
Sources: Hollywood Reporter; The Guardian; Hollywood.com; TCM

- The Andy Williams Show (1962) TV Series (choreographer) (1962–1963)
- Judy and Her Guests, Phil Silvers and Robert Goulet (1963) (TV) (choreographer)
- Mary Poppins (1964) (choreographer)
- The King Family Show (1965) TV Series (choreographer)
- The Sound of Music (1965) (choreographer)
- The Happiest Millionaire (1967) (stager: musical numbers)
- Chitty Chitty Bang Bang (1968) (choreographer)
- Of Thee I Sing (1972) (TV) (choreographer)
- The Cher Show (1975) TV Series (choreographer)
- John Denver and Friend (1976) (TV) (choreographer)
- Benji's Very Own Christmas Story (1978) (TV) (choreographer)
- In God We Tru$t (1980) (choreographer)
- Los Angeles 1984: Games of the XXIII Olympiad: (1984) (mini) TV Series (assistant choreographer)
- Liberty Weekend (1986) (TV) (choreographer)
- Beaches (1988) (choreographer)
- Prop Culture (2020) (TV) (herself)
