= Kathryn Burns =

Television choreographer

Kathryn Burns, also known as Kat Burns, is a choreographer known for her work on the musical comedy television series Crazy Ex-Girlfriend, for which she has won two Primetime Emmy Awards.

== Career ==
By 2017, Burns had choreographed more than 60 musical numbers for Crazy Ex-Girlfriend. Her work on three numbers from the series earned her the 2016 Primetime Emmy Award for Outstanding Choreography.

In a 2017 profile, The New Yorker praised the series' plot-driven song-and-dance numbers and examined Burns's process of shaping choreography around story, genre, and the performers' abilities. Between the first and second seasons, she also held private ballet lessons for Rachel Bloom at Bloom's request.

Burns choreographed dance sequences across a range of musical styles for Crazy Ex-Girlfriend. During the production of the second-season episode "Josh Is the Man of My Dreams, Right?", she rehearsed Bloom and Scott Michael Foster for the ballroom duet.

Burns won a second Emmy for her choreography on the series in 2019.

In 2019, Burns choreographed the series' concert special, Yes, It's Really Us Singing: The Crazy Ex-Girlfriend Concert Special!, after four years choreographing musical numbers for the series.
