= Jennifer Hamilton =

Television choreographer

Jennifer Hamilton is a choreographer known for her work on the comedy-drama series Physical, for which she received a Primetime Emmy Award nomination.

== Career ==
Hamilton choreographed dance and fitness routines for the Apple TV+ series Physical, developing the show's movement language. In developing the choreography, she drew on 1980s workout styles and emphasized exaggerated, hip-heavy movement.

Before filming Physical, Rose Byrne trained with Hamilton over Zoom for two months.

Byrne later described Hamilton as integral to shaping the physicality of her character, Sheila Rubin. After the series ended, Byrne called Hamilton "a wonderful choreographer" and said that she had become her cheerleader during the months of physical training.

In a 2024 interview with AMFM Magazine, Hamilton discussed choreographing the third season of Physical.

Hamilton received a 2024 Primetime Emmy Award nomination for Outstanding Choreography for Scripted Programming for her work on Physical, for the routines "Jean Franc's Advanced Aerobics Class", "Figure 8's Commercial" and "Xanadu & Dreams".
