= The Jackie Gleason Show =

Television series

- Also known as: Cavalcade of Stars (DuMont)
- Genre: Variety
- Presented by: Jackie Gleason
- Opening theme: "Melancholy Serenade" (CBS)
- Composer: Jackie Gleason
- Country of origin: United States
- Original language: English
- No. of seasons: 4
- No. of episodes: 156 (list of episodes)

Production
- Camera setup: Multi-camera
- Running time: 47–50 minutes

Original release
- Network: DuMont
- Release: June 4, 1949 – September 26, 1952
- Network: CBS
- Release: September 20, 1952 – June 22, 1957

The Jackie Gleason Show is a series of American network television shows that starred Jackie Gleason, which ran from 1952 to 1970, in various forms.

== Cavalcade of Stars ==
Gleason's first variety series, which aired on the DuMont Television Network under the title Cavalcade of Stars, first aired June 4, 1949. The show's first host was comedian Jack Carter, who was followed by Jerry Lester. Lester moved to NBC in June 1950 to host the late-night show Broadway Open House, a precursor to "The Tonight Show", and Gleason—who had made his mark filling in for William Bendix as the title character on the first television incarnation of The Life of Riley sitcom—stepped into Cavalcade on July 15, 1950 and became an immediate sensation.

The show was broadcast live in front of a theater audience, and offered the same kind of vaudevillian entertainment common to early television revues. Gleason's guests included New York-based performers of stage and screen, including Bert Wheeler, Smith and Dale, Patricia Morison, and Vivian Blaine. Production values were modest, owing to DuMont's humble facilities and a thrifty sponsor (Quality Drugs, representing most of the nation's drug stores).

In 1952, CBS president William S. Paley offered Gleason a considerably higher salary to move to that network. The series was retitled The Jackie Gleason Show and premiered on CBS Television on September 20, 1952. In 1953, CBS' own orchestral accordionist John Serry Sr. made a cameo appearance.

While much of DuMont's programming archive was destroyed after they ceased broadcasting, a surprising number of Cavalcade of Stars episodes survive, including several episodes at the UCLA Film and Television Archive. Additionally, at least 14 Gleason episodes survive at the Paley Center for Media.

In his book The Forgotten Network, author David Weinstein mentions an unusual aspect of the DuMont network. He notes that while Drug Store Productions was technically the sponsor, they in turn sold the commercial air time to various companies and products. Weinstein notes this as an early example of U.S. network television moving away from the single-sponsor system typical of the early 1950s. He quotes former DuMont executive Ted Bergmann describing the DuMont version as featuring six commercial breaks during the hour, with each break comprising a single one-minute commercial.

== Format ==
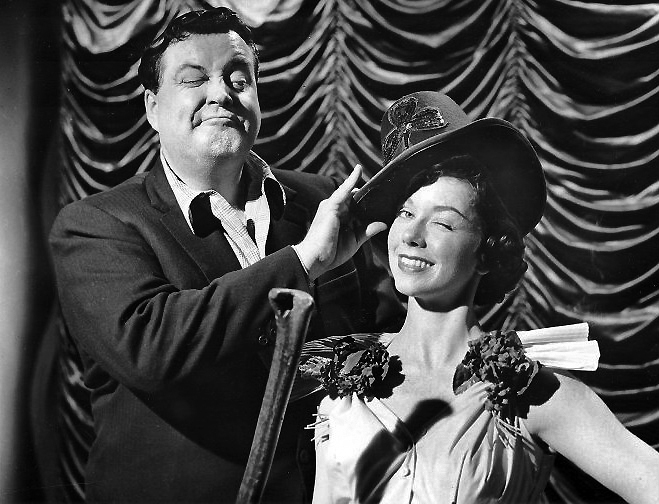
Gleason and June Taylor dancer Margaret Jeanne (1955)

The show typically opened with a monologue from Gleason, followed by sketch comedy involving Gleason and a number of regular performers (including Art Carney) and a musical interlude featuring the June Taylor Dancers. (Taylor later became Gleason's sister-in-law; he married her sister Marilyn in 1975.)

Gleason portrayed a number of recurring characters, including:

- supercilious, mustachioed playboy millionaire Reginald Van Gleason III (Gleason's personal favorite)
- friendly Joe the Bartender
- loudmouthed braggart Charlie Bratton
- Rum Dum, a hapless dipsomaniac with a walrus mustache
- mild-mannered Fenwick Babbitt
- The Bachelor who was forever unmarried
- bombastic Rudy the Repairman
- a put-upon character known only as the Poor Soul, whom Gleason performed in pantomime.
- Stanley R. Sogg, late-night movie pitchman for Mother Fletcher's products ("No-Cal Chicken Fat")
- blowhard Brooklyn bus driver Ralph Kramden

The series was a big hit for CBS, finishing at #8 in the Nielsen ratings for the 1953–1954 season and #2 in 1954–1955. The Jackie Gleason Show also earned Emmy nominations for best variety series in 1953, 1954 and 1955, for Gleason as best star in 1954 and 1955, for Audrey Meadows as best supporting actress in 1954 and 1957, Art Carney for best supporting actor in 1957, June Taylor for best choreography in 1956, and best writing and best engineering effects in 1955. The series won Emmys for Meadows as best supporting actress in 1955, Carney as best supporting actor in 1954 and 1955, and Taylor for choreography in 1955. Gleason never received an Emmy.

== The Honeymooners ==
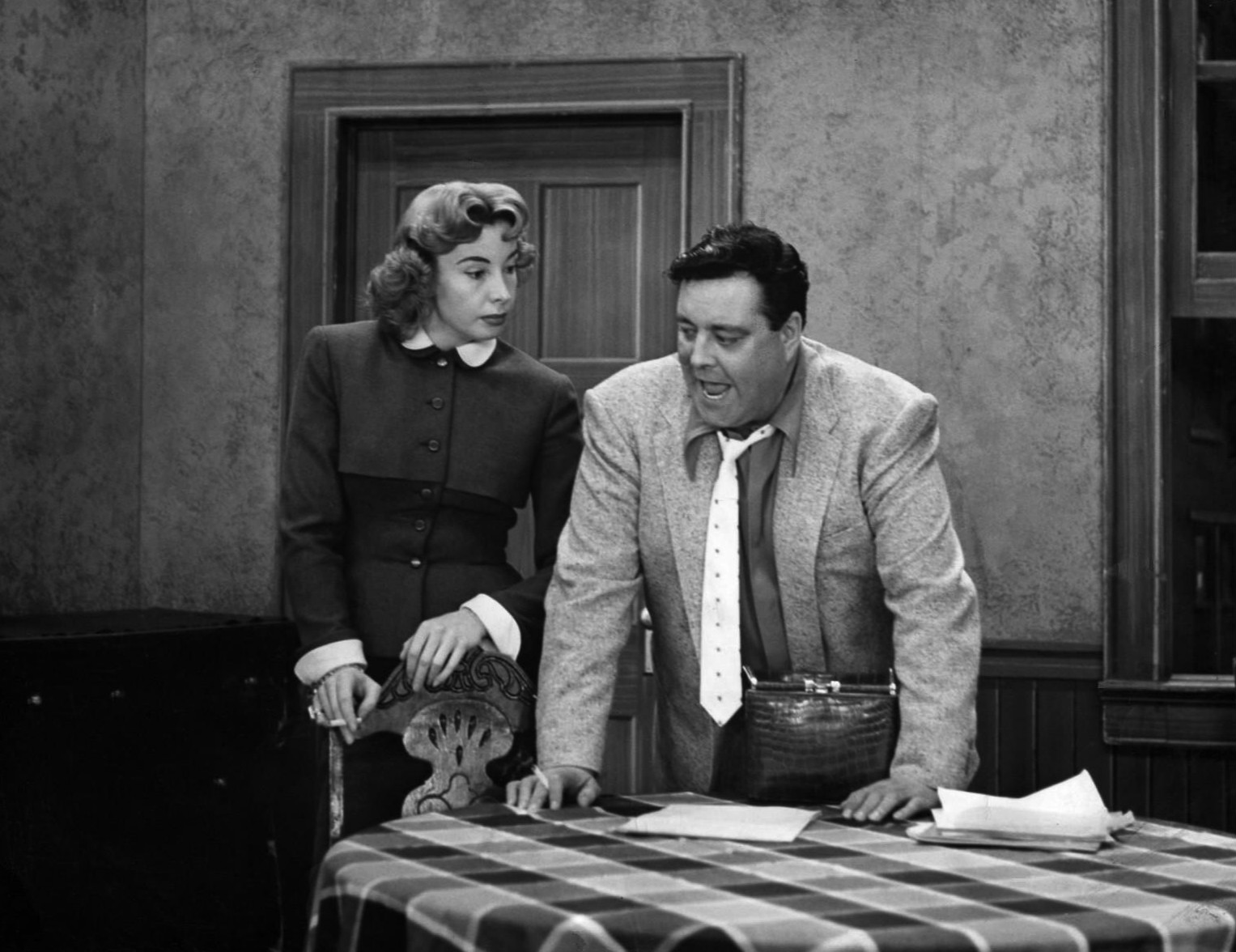
Gleason and Audrey Meadows as Ralph and Alice Kramden (1956)

By far the most memorable and popular of Gleason's characters was blowhard Brooklyn bus driver Ralph Kramden, featured originally in a series of Cavalcade skits known as "The Honeymooners", with Pert Kelton as his wife Alice, and Art Carney as his upstairs neighbor Ed Norton. These were so popular that in 1955 Gleason suspended the variety format and filmed The Honeymooners as a regular half-hour sitcom (television's first spin-off), co-starring Carney, Audrey Meadows (who had replaced the blacklisted Kelton after the earlier move to CBS), and Joyce Randolph. Finishing 19th in the ratings, these 39 episodes were subsequently rerun constantly in syndication, often five nights a week, with the cycle repeating every two months for decades. They are probably the most familiar body of work from 1950s television with the exception of I Love Lucy starring Lucille Ball and Desi Arnaz.

The show's original variety format and title returned in September 1956 and continued until June 1957. Then, in October 1958, Gleason debuted a half-hour version of The Jackie Gleason Show, with Buddy Hackett as a sidekick, but it was short-lived, cancelled in January 1959.

== The Jackie Gleason Show (1961 revision) ==
The Jackie Gleason Show
- Genre: Talk show
- Presented by: Jackie Gleason
- Narrated by: Johnny Olson
- Country of origin: United States
- Original language: English
- No. of seasons: 1
- No. of episodes: 8 (excluding You're in the Picture)

Production
- Camera setup: Multi-camera
- Running time: 24-25 minutes

Original release
- Network: CBS
- Release: February 3 – March 24, 1961

In 1961, Gleason began an ill-fated stint as host of a game show called You're in the Picture, which lasted only one episode, and was so poorly received that it led to Gleason offering an on-air apology to his viewers the following week. Committed to filling a quota of episodes, Gleason renamed the series The Jackie Gleason Show and turned it into a short-lived talk show, featuring one-on-one informal interviews with Art Carney, Jayne Mansfield, Bobby Darin, and other friends and celebrities. It ran for eight episodes.

== American Scene Magazine (1962–1965) ==
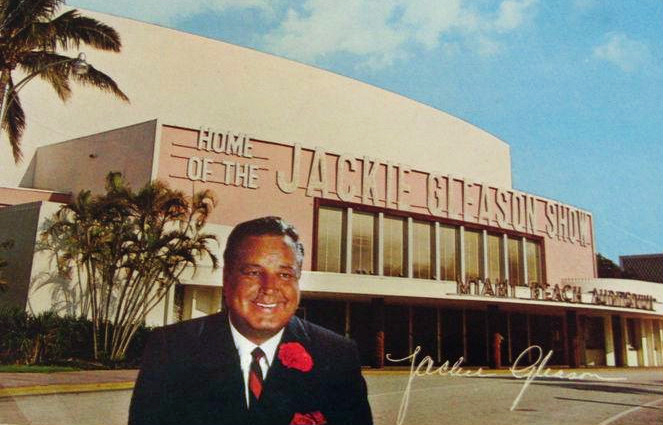
Photo postcard in response to ticket requests after The Jackie Gleason Show moved to Miami in 1964. Note a very tanned Gleason.

In 1962, Gleason returned to the tried-and-true variety format with his American Scene Magazine. The official title of the show was, again, The Jackie Gleason Show. American Scene was initially taped in New York City; after two seasons, production moved to Miami Beach (1964), on Jackie's insistence. (This caused difficulties for announcer Johnny Olson, who had several other announcing jobs; Olson commuted frequently between New York City and Miami to accommodate Gleason.)

Gleason would begin his monologue each week and be surprised by the flamboyant jackets worn by bandleader Sammy Spear. (Beholding Spear's animal-print blazer, Gleason quipped, "I've heard of Tiger Rag, but this is ridiculous!") Ralph Kramden, Reggie Van Gleason, the Poor Soul, and the rest of Gleason's comic characters were regular attractions. Frank Fontaine, as bug-eyed, grinning "Crazy" Guggenheim (evolved from his John character from The Jack Benny Program), starred in the Joe the Bartender skits, delighting fans with his nutty speaking voice and goofy laugh, and charmed by his surprisingly mellow singing voice. June Taylor's chorus girl routines revived for the television generation the aerial pattern kaleidoscope formations made famous on film by Busby Berkeley. During this time, Gleason's show finished #17 for the 1962–1963 season, #15 for 1963–1964, #21 in 1964–1965 and #24 in 1965–1966.

== The Jackie Gleason Show (1966–1970) ==
In fall 1966, the show title reverted to simply The Jackie Gleason Show (dropping the American Scene format), and would remain so until its cancellation in 1970. By this point episodes included guest stars and skits. A component during this period was the musical Honeymooners episodes, which had first been tried on Gleason's variety show during the 1956–1957 season. These were later collected as The Color Honeymooners, with Sheila MacRae and Jane Kean as Alice and Trixie, respectively. The regular cast included Art Carney; Milton Berle was a frequent guest star. The show was shot in color on videotape at the Miami Beach Auditorium (today called the Fillmore at the Jackie Gleason Theatre), and Gleason never tired of promoting the "sun and fun capital of the world" on camera. Hordes of vacationers took Gleason's advice, boosting Florida's economy. Later specials were taped at the Olympia Theatre's Gusman Center across Biscayne Bay in downtown Miami. The shows began with the television camera in front of a boat speeding toward the shore of Miami Beach, and ended with Gleason bellowing, "Miami Beach audiences are the greatest audiences in the world!"

During this period, The Jackie Gleason Show earned three more Emmy nominations, for Carney for special classification in 1966 and for variety series and writing in 1967. Carney won two Emmys for his work in 1967 and 1968. The series also ranked at No. 5 in 1966-1967 and No. 9 in 1967-1968. Music was composed by Milton Kaye.

At the end of the 1968–1969 season, The Jackie Gleason Show still garnered decent ratings, ranking at No. 25 in the Nielsens and CBS renewed it for an eighth season. The following year would bring a radical change to the series: Gleason went on a stringent diet in 1969 and lost approximately 60 pounds. When the show returned in September 1969, there was much publicity about Gleason's new slimmer look. To gracefully incorporate his weight loss into the show, it was explained that Ralph Kramden also had gone on a diet and lost weight.

This change proved to be somewhat of a detriment – especially since Carney had gained weight. Jokes about Kramden's weight had been a strong component of humor for the Honeymooners sketches. A skinnier Ralph did not seem as funny to viewers and the overall ratings for the program began to slip. Coupled with the fact that the CBS network was concerned with demographics and wanted to change its image with more urban-oriented shows (to attract younger, more affluent audiences). In addition, CBS wanted Gleason to do only the hour-long Honeymooners and drop the variety episodes that garnered lower ratings. Gleason objected to this and, on February 16, 1970, CBS announced the cancellation of Gleason's series, during a time frame that also saw the cancellation of The Red Skelton Hour and Petticoat Junction, in the opening salvos of what would become popularly known as the rural purge.

Beginning in late December 1970 CBS began airing selected reruns of The Jackie Gleason Show (featuring only the color Honeymooners episodes) in prime time on Sunday nights at 10 p.m. which replaced The Tim Conway Comedy Hour.

== See also ==
- List of programs broadcast by the DuMont Television Network
- List of surviving DuMont Television Network broadcasts

== Bibliography ==
- Brooks, Tim; Marsh, Earle (1964). The Complete Directory to Prime Time Network TV Shows (Third ed.). New York: Ballantine Books. ISBN 0-345-31864-1.
- McNeil, Alex (1980). Total Television (Fourth ed.). New York: Penguin Books. ISBN 0-14-024916-8.
