= Physical (TV series) =

2021 American comedy-drama streaming series

- Genre: Comedy-drama; Dark comedy
- Created by: Annie Weisman
- Starring: Rose Byrne; Rory Scovel; Paul Sparks; Geoffrey Arend; Della Saba; Lou Taylor Pucci; Dierdre Friel; Ashley Liao; José Zúñiga; Zooey Deschanel
- Narrated by: Rose Byrne
- Composer: Isabella Summers
- Country of origin: United States
- Original language: English
- No. of seasons: 3
- No. of episodes: 30

Production
- Executive producers: Annie Weisman; Craig Gillespie; Liza Johnson; Stephanie Laing; Alexandra Cunningham; Marty Adelstein; Becky Clements; Sera Gamble; John McNamara; Rose Byrne
- Running time: 23–34 minutes
- Production companies: Parasox; High Kick Productions; Nutmegger, Inc.; Fabrication; Tomorrow Studios

Original release
- Network: Apple TV+
- Release: June 18, 2021 – September 27, 2023

Physical is an American drama television series, with some dark comedic aspects, created by Annie Weisman. The series premiered on Apple TV+ on June 18, 2021. In August 2021, prior to the airing of its season one finale, the series was renewed for a second season; season two premiered in June 2022. In August 2022, despite declining streaming numbers, the series was renewed for a third (and final) season, which premiered in August 2023.

== Premise ==
Set in 1980s San Diego, California, Physical is a dark comedy following the uptight Sheila Rubin (Rose Byrne) through her journey of self-discovery via extra-marital affairs, eating disorders, and aerobics.

== Cast and characters ==
=== Main ===
- Rose Byrne as Sheila D. Rubin, a housewife struggling between her straining marriage, lifelong battle with an eating disorder, and a newfound obsession with the new, burgeoning field of aerobic exercise
- Rory Scovel as Danny Rubin, Sheila's eco-conscious and liberal husband
- Paul Sparks as John Breem, a conservative Mormon mall owner who begins an affair with Sheila
- Della Saba as Bunny Kazam, an aerobics instructor and Tyler's girlfriend (seasons 1-2; guest season 3) (Note: Saba and Pucci appear in the series finale, credited as main cast members)
- Lou Taylor Pucci as Tyler, a surfer and Bunny's boyfriend (seasons 1-2; guest season 3)
- Dierdre Friel as Greta Hauser, a housewife who becomes Sheila's best friend and business partner
- Geoffrey Arend as Jerry Goldman, an old friend of Sheila and Danny who becomes Danny's campaign manager (season 1; guest seasons 2 & 3) (Note: Arend appears in only one episode of season 2 although is credited as a main cast member)
- Ashley Liao as Simone (season 1)
- Zooey Deschanel as Kelly Kilmartin, a sitcom star and aerobics instructor who also acts as a manifestation of Sheila's mental illness (season 3)

=== Recurring ===
- Ian Gomez as Ernie Hauser, a tech pioneer and Greta's husband
- Erin Pineda as Maria Breem, John's wife
- Grace Kelly Quigley as Maya Rubin, Sheila and Danny's daughter
- Al Madrigal as Jack Logan, a friend of Danny and Sheila's and Tanya's husband (season 1)
- Mary Holland as Tanya Logan, a friend of Danny and Sheila's and Jack's wife (season 1; guest season 2)
- Wallace Langham as Auggie Cartwright (season 2; guest season 1)
- Murray Bartlett as Vinnie Green, an aerobics instructor (season 2)
- Anna Gunn as Marika Green, Vinnie’s wife (season 2; guest season 3)
- Tawny Newsome as Wanda (season 2)
- Donny Divanian as Kevin Cartwright, Auggie’s son (season 2)
- Emjay Anthony as Zeke Breem, John and Maria's son (season 2-3; portrayed by Ian Ousley in season 1)
- Jillian Armenante as Harriet, an ally Sheila meets in rehab (season 3; guest season 2)
- Paloma Esparza Rabinov as Fidelia, Sheila’s assistant (season 3; guest season 2)
- Casey Wilson as Deb, Danny's sister (season 3)
- José Zúñiga as Carlos, a restaurateur who grows close to Sheila (season 3)

== Episodes ==
=== Series overview ===
Season	Episodes	Originally released	
Season	Episodes	First released	Last released
1	10	June 18, 2021	August 6, 2021
2	10	June 3, 2022	August 5, 2022
3	10	August 2, 2023	September 27, 2023

=== Season 1 (2021) ===
No. overall	No. in season	Title	Directed by	Written by	Original release date
1	1	"Let's Do This Thing"	Craig Gillespie	Annie Weisman	June 18, 2021
2	2	"Let's Get Political"	Liza Johnson	Annie Weisman	June 18, 2021
3	3	"Let's Get Down To Business"	Stephanie Laing	Rosa Handelman	June 18, 2021
4	4	"Let's Get This Party Started"	Liza Johnson	Jessica Dickey	June 25, 2021
5	5	"Let's Agree to Disagree"	Stephanie Laing	Alexandra Cunningham	July 2, 2021
6	6	"Let's Get It on Tape"	Stephanie Laing	Lex Edness	July 9, 2021
7	7	"Let's Take This Show on the Road"	Stephanie Laing	Annie Weisman	July 16, 2021
8	8	"Let's Not and Say We Did"	Stephanie Laing	Justin Bonilla	July 23, 2021
9	9	"Let's Face the Facts"	Stephanie Laing	Rosa Handelman	July 30, 2021
10	10	"Let's Get Together"	Liza Johnson, Stephanie Laing	Annie Weisman	August 6, 2021

=== Season 2 (2022) ===
No. overall	No. in season	Title	Directed by	Written by	Original release date
11	1	"Don't You Want Me"	Stephanie Laing	Annie Weisman	June 3, 2022
12	2	"Don't You Ever Stop"	Stephanie Laing	Rachel Caris Love	June 10, 2022
13	3	"Don't You Go Far"	Dan Lazarovits	Jessica Dickey	June 17, 2022
14	4	"Don't You Know"	Dan Lazarovits	K.C. Scott	June 24, 2022
15	5	"Don't You Want to Watch"	Stephanie Laing	Justin Bonilla	July 1, 2022
16	6	"Don't You Have Enough"	Stephanie Laing	Jackie Li	July 8, 2022
17	7	"Don't Try This at Home"	Stephanie Laing	Coleman Herbert	July 15, 2022
18	8	"Don't You Run and Hide"	Stephanie Laing	Rosa Handelman	July 22, 2022
19	9	"Don't You Want to Get Better"	Stephanie Laing	Coleman Herbert	July 29, 2022
20	10	"Don't You Say It's Over"	Stephanie Laing	Story by : Annie Weisman & Erika A. Schleich; Teleplay by : Annie Weisman	August 5, 2022

=== Season 3 (2023) ===
No. overall	No. in season	Title	Directed by	Written by	Original release date
21	1	"Like a Whole New Woman"	Stephanie Laing	Annie Weisman	August 2, 2023
22	2	"Like a Bitch"	Stephanie Laing	Coleman Herbert	August 2, 2023
23	3	"Like It's on Fire"	Stephanie Laing	K.C. Scott	August 9, 2023
24	4	"Like a Rocket"	Stephanie Laing	Yael Green	August 16, 2023
25	5	"Like Crazy"	Stephanie Laing	Boo Killebrew	August 23, 2023
26	6	"Like You Mean It"	Stephanie Laing	Coleman Herbert	August 30, 2023
27	7	"Like No One's Watching"	Stephanie Laing	Yael Green & K.C. Scott	September 6, 2023
28	8	"Like a Mouse"	Stephanie Laing	Boo Killebrew	September 13, 2023
29	9	"Like We Never Left"	Annie Weisman	Coleman Herbert	September 20, 2023
30	10	"Like a Prayer"	Stephanie Laing	Annie Weisman	September 27, 2023

== Production ==
=== Development ===
In January 2020, it was reported that Apple was nearing a series order for Physical, created and written by Annie Weisman, with Tomorrow Studios set to produce. In December 2020, Craig Gillespie, Liza Johnson, and Stephanie Laing were announced as directors for the series, with Gillespie set to direct the pilot episode. The series consists of roughly half-hour long episodes and each season consists of ten episodes.

On August 4, 2021, Apple TV+ renewed the series for a second season. On August 11, 2022, Apple TV+ renewed the series for a third season.

=== Casting ===
In January 2020, it was reported that Rose Byrne was cast as the lead actress of Physical. In December 2020, it was announced that Byrne was playing the role of Sheila Rubin, with Paul Sparks, Rory Scovel, Lou Taylor Pucci, Della Saba, Dierdre Friel, and Ashley Liao joining the cast. Geoffrey Arend joined the cast in January 2021, with Ian Gomez joining in April 2021. In October 2022, Zooey Deschanel joined the cast for the third season.

=== Filming ===
Filming for the first season began in November 2020 and ended in March 2021. The second season began filming in November 2021 and ended in March 2022. The series's dance and fitness routines were choreographed by Jennifer Hamilton, drawing her inspiration from old 1980s aerobics styles, including Jane Fonda; Hamilton also was responsible for training Rose Byrne for the role.

== Release ==
The series premiered on June 18, 2021, on Apple TV + globally, with the first three episodes available immediately and the remainder of the season debuting each Friday, on a weekly basis. The second season premiered on June 3, 2022. The third and final season was released on August 2, 2023.

== Reception ==
On Metacritic, Physical has a weighted average score of 60 out of 100, based on 21 critics, indicating "mixed or average reviews".

On Rotten Tomatoes, the first season holds an approval rating of 64% based on 50 critic reviews, with an average rating of 6.4/10. The website's critical consensus reads:

"Not even a magnetic performance from Rose Byrne can save Physical from its exhausting parade of unpleasant characters and plot choices."

However German magazine Spiegel praised the show for maintaining its satirical take on shallow consumerism beyond the initial episodes, noting that it "thankfully doesn't develop into the edifying but mendacious self-empowerment drama that convention would demand, and some critics apparently expected," and suggested that this may have been the reason for the poor ratings from American reviewers.

The second season has an approval rating of 92% on Rotten Tomatoes, based on 12 critic reviews, with an average rating of 8.6/10. The website's critics consensus reads:

"Rose Byrne's blood, sweat, and tears are finally given a worthy bedrock as Physical finds its gyrating groove in this much-improved sophomore season."

The third and final season has an approval rating of 93% on Rotten Tomatoes, based on 15 critic reviews. The website's critics consensus reads:

"Physical packs it in with a final season that, much like a good workout, is bracing but pays off with a satisfying endorphin rush."
