= Lester Wilson =

American actor (1942–1993)

- Born: April 13, 1942; New York City, New York, U.S.
- Died: February 14, 1993 (aged 50); Los Angeles, California, U.S.
- Occupations: Dancer/Choreographer and Actor
- Years active: 1964–1993 (his death)
- Partner: Zack Reed

Lester Wilson (April 13, 1942 – February 14, 1993) was an African-American dancer, choreographer, and actor. Wilson attended the Juilliard School. Bob Fosse cast him in a 1963 revival of Pal Joey at the New York City Center. Wilson toured London with Sammy Davis Jr. in Golden Boy. In 1969, he was responsible with 24 of his dancers for the choreography of Johnny Hallyday's show at the Palais des Sports in Paris.

Lester's best known choreography was the 1977 movie Saturday Night Fever for which he coached John Travolta. Wilson had choreographed for Diana Ross, Dalida, Gladys Knight, Billy Crystal, Liza Minnelli and Ann-Margret, in her Las Vegas stage spectaculars. He also choreographed the 1992 movie Sister Act.

In 1991, Wilson was nominated for an American Emmy Award for the choreography in the ABC special American Dance Honors. Lester also choreographed several Broadway musicals, including Grind with Ben Vereen.

== Death ==
In February 1993, Wilson died of a heart attack in Los Angeles at the age of 50. Wilson was a major contributor to the fight against AIDS, notably in choreography created for AIDS Project/L.A. He had previously undergone a quintuple bypass in 1979 at the age of 37.

He also appeared on Good Times as a grocery store manager in a 1975 episode entitled "Florida's Protest".

== Personal life ==
He was homosexual.

== Filmography ==
- Der Kommissar, episode In letzter Minute, West Germany (1970), musical act, actor
- Funny Lady (1975) Columbia Pictures Corp., assistant choreographer
- Saturday Night Fever (1977), choreographer
- Beat Street (1984), choreographer
- The Last Dragon (1985) with co-choreographer Lawrence Leritz
- Scrooged (1988) Paramount Pictures—choreographer, actor
- Hot Shots! (1991) Twentieth Century Fox, choreographer
- Hot Shots! Part Deux (1993) Twentieth Century Fox, choreographer
- Sister Act (1992) Touchstone Pictures, musical staging
- Made in America (1993) Stonebridge Entertainment, choreographer
