= June Taylor =

American choreographer

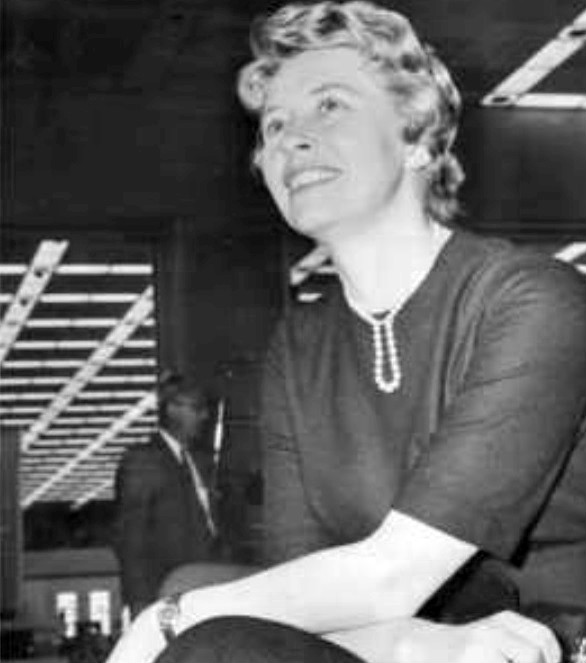
- Taylor in 1958.
- Born: Marjorie June Taylor; December 14, 1917; Chicago, Illinois, US
- Died: May 16, 2004 (aged 86); Miami, Florida, US
- Occupation: choreographer
- Years active: 1942–1990
- Spouse: Sol Lerner (m. 1945; died 1986)
- Career
- Former groups: Six June Taylor Dancers; June Taylor Girls; Taylor Made Dancers; The Toastettes; June Taylor Dancers
- Dances: Acrobatic Dance; Ballet; Ballroom Dance; Jazz Dance; Modern Dance; Tap Dance

Marjorie June Taylor (December 14, 1917 – May 16, 2004) was an American choreographer, best known as the founder of the June Taylor Dancers, who were featured on Jackie Gleason's various television variety programs.

== Early life ==
Taylor was born in Chicago, the daughter of Percival Guy Taylor (1893-1968) and Angeline Veronica (née Campbell) Taylor (1897-1977). Her sister, Marilyn, was born October 6, 1925.

== Career ==
=== Early career ===
Taylor started taking dance lessons at age eight; by age 13, she lied about her age to get into the chorus of George White's Scandals in her hometown and became one of the dancers at the Chicago nightclub, Chez Paree. At age 17, Taylor left Chicago to perform in London with the Ted Lewis Band. At age 19, she was touring the US and Europe as a dancer in various nightclubs. She returned from London and began performing again in Chicago. In 1938, at age 21, Taylor collapsed on stage, ill with tuberculosis; she spent the next two years in a sanitarium, after which she turned to choreography, founding her own dance troupe in 1942, which made its first professional appearance at Chicago's Blackhawk restaurant.

Taylor's first troupe consisted of three friends and her sister, Marilyn, and opened for band leader Ted Weems. In 1946, she met Jackie Gleason at a Baltimore nightclub. The two became friends when Taylor helped Gleason overcome a case of stage fright. In 1948, Taylor made her television debut on The Toast of the Town starring Ed Sullivan, where six of her original dancers appeared as The Toastettes, bringing the chorus line to television. In 1949, she crossed paths with Gleason on NBC's The Broadway Spotlight. and joined Gleason's Cavalcade of Stars, and followed him, along with 16 dancers, to The Jackie Gleason Show, where her signature was the overhead camera shot of the dancers making kaleidoscopic geometric patterns. She opened up a dance school with instructors tap, ballet, and modern dancing.

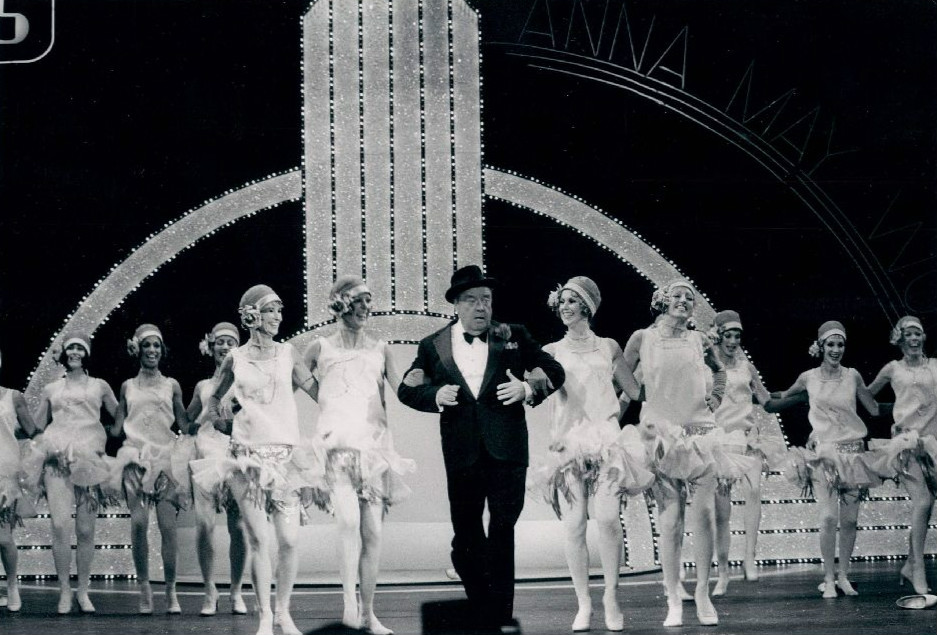
June Taylor Dancers with Jackie Gleason on one of his television specials.

=== The June Taylor Dancers ===
Taylor was initially dubious about joining Gleason on his DuMont Network show because it meant signing a long-term contract; her husband, Sol Lerner, suggested she take the offer. The high-kicking, smiling routines that formed the first three minutes of each broadcast were Broadway-based and reminiscent of The Rockettes. In addition to Gleason's show, the June Taylor Dancers also made appearances at the General Motors Motorama auto shows in New York City and Boston and on Stage Show. Gleason and Taylor also worked together to produce a television ballet, Tawny, in 1953; the music was done by Gleason and the choreography by Taylor. In 1954, Gleason doubled the size of the dancers from sixteen to thirty-two. Taylor won an Emmy Award for choreography in 1955.

The group of sixteen female dancers that performed Taylor's choreography on The Jackie Gleason Show, was an incredibly talented group of women who produced an immense body of work and had a profound impact on the development of tap dance as an art form through the 1950s and 1960s. At this time, tap dancers were struggling to find work as the public lost interest in tap and the professional dance economy collapsed. This so-called “death of tap” occurred for a variety of reasons, including new styles of music like bebop and rock and roll, musicals such as Oklahoma! bringing ballet to the Broadway stage, laws taxing cabaret performances, and the growing ubiquity of television in people's homes.

The complexity and excitement of a live tap performance simply did not translate to the small television screens. Blurry, pixelated screens and crude camerawork meant that the nuances of the movement were lost, and a dance form as specific and precise as tap suffered the most. This required stylistic innovation, with choreography that focused more on the larger shapes of the body instead of the intricate rhythms of the feet, so that it would appear dynamic on a small screen. Additionally, while professional dancers could previously perform the same routines again and again, television required an entirely new routine week after week. June Taylor took this in stride, telling The New York Times that “one of the first things I learned in television was the necessity of varying the style of the dancing each week … people want something new.” Taylor's choreography does show a remarkable amount of variety, both within a single dance to keep viewers entertained and from week to week.

One dance from the April 21, 1956, episode, titled “Bumble Boogie,” features a 13-year-old violin prodigy playing live while the dancers in bumblebee costumes spin and tap around him. The dance features a range of steps from classical ballet pique turns and saut de basques to popular lindy hop and Charleston steps. The formational changes are complex, and the movement is all very precisely timed, requiring an immense amount of rehearsal in just one week. Other dances they performed on the show involve complex tap dance sequences, kicklines, and even twirling and throwing hula hoops. They often involve June Taylor's signature overhead kaleidoscopic Busby Berkeley-esque shots, in which the dancers lie on the floor in a circle and move their legs to create different shapes together, an effect that could not be produced in a traditional stage setting. Due to the specific demands of television, the expectations of dancers changed, and it seems that those expectations became much harder to fulfill, as many dancers were not able to keep up. This emphasizes the unique hard work and success of June Taylor and her dancers, as they stepped up to fill the new roles created by the medium of television.

Mercedes Ellington, granddaughter of Duke Ellington and daughter of Mercer Ellington, became the group's first and only African-American dancer in 1963. In a Dance Magazine article after Taylor's death, Mercedes Ellington emphasized Taylor's role as a mentor in her career, saying that “she looked after me.”

In 1964, Gleason moved his television show to the Miami Beach Civic Auditorium. As a result, Taylor closed her dance school in New York in 1964 and moved to Florida where she found that her health improved. In 1965, the June Taylor Dancers added male performers to the troupe.

=== Later career ===
In 1978, Taylor, who lived in Fort Lauderdale, Florida, after Gleason moved production of his show from New York to Miami Beach, began choreographing the Miami Dolphins cheerleading squad, the Dolphin Starbrites, and served in this capacity until 1990. The Starbrites, famous for their one-piece bathing suits and go-go boots, performed Broadway-style halftime shows. In February 1992, she produced and directed UNICEF's A Tribute to the World's Children. In 1991, Taylor was honored for her contributions to dance at the Capezio Awards.

== Personal life and death ==
Taylor's father died in 1968 after killing his current wife and himself in a murder-suicide. Her mother died in February 1977 at 79 years old. She married theatrical attorney Sol Lerner in 1945; the couple had no children. Lerner died in 1986 Her sister, and sometime dance partner, Marilyn Taylor Horwich, became Jackie Gleason's third wife in 1975.

Taylor died on May 16, 2004, at the Miami Heart Institute, in Miami, Florida, from natural causes, aged 86. She is buried in Our Lady of Mercy Catholic Cemetery in Miami, near Gleason's outdoor mausoleum. and next to her husband and attorney, Sol Lerner. In addition to her sister, Taylor was survived by a nephew, Craig Horwich.

== In popular culture ==
- The character June from Playhouse Disney's Little Einsteins is named after her as an honor.
- On May 9, 2000, Taylor was interviewed by the Academy of Television Arts & Sciences Foundation's Archive of American Television. This interview can be seen at the Archive's website.
- In 2001, Taylor was featured on episodes of A&E's TVOGRAPHY, a program about America's favorite TV shows.

== Credits ==
- Ed Sullivan's Toast of the Town - 1948 – 49
- The Broadway Spotlight 1949
- Jackie Gleason's Cavalcade of Stars - 1950 – 52
- The Jackie Gleason Show - 1952 – 59; 1962 – 70
- Stage Show - 1955 – 56
- What's My Line? - 1956
