= Marguerite Derricks =

Ballerina and choreographer

- Born: 1961 (age 64–65); Buffalo, New York
- Other names: Marguerite Pomerhn-Derricks
- Occupations: Choreographer, former ballerina
- Years active: 1982–present

Marguerite Pomerhn-Derricks (born 1961), professionally known as Marguerite Derricks, is a former ballerina and choreographer from Buffalo, New York.

Derricks studied ballet at the National Ballet School of Canada; she admired Karen Kain. Derricks was behind the choreography of two films similar in their subject matter, Striptease (1996) and Showgirls (1995). Some of her more noted works include the Austin Powers films, 10 Things I Hate About You (1999), Donnie Darko (2001), Little Miss Sunshine (2006), and Spider-Man 3 (2007). Her TV credits include The Marvelous Mrs. Maisel, Westworld, American Horror Story, and Bunheads. After the first Austin Powers film, she became famous and increased her reputation with an advertisement for The Gap, "Go Go." During one interview, she said that with regard to her newfound popularity, "it all started with Mike [Myers]," (the star of Austin Powers) and added that "Go Go has changed my life."

In 2006, Derricks choreographed Sister Act the Musical, which had its world premiere at the Pasadena Playhouse. In 2009, she served as the choreographer for director Kevin Tancharoen's remake of the movie Fame, and for Gregory Boyd and Frank Wildhorn's musical Wonderland – a twist on the Alice in Wonderland children's story. Derricks also choreographed Tom Cruise's dance performance as the movie mogul Les Grossman in the 2008 film Tropic Thunder.

== Recognition ==
Derricks is the only choreographer to win three consecutive Emmy Awards: she won for her work on the television series 3rd Rock from the Sun (1997), Fame L.A. (1998), and the 1998 Goodwill Games Ceremony (1999). In 2002, she won an American Choreography Award for her work on That '70s Show adding to two others for The Gap "Go Go" and the short lived sitcom Jenny starring Jenny McCarthy. She won an NAACP Award for Best Choreography for Sister Act the Musical. She has also won four MTV Movie Awards for Best Dance (Austin Powers, Charlie's Angels, 10 Things I Hate About You, and American Wedding).
