= Ernie Flatt =

American choreographer and dancer

- Born: Ernest Orville Flatt; October 30, 1918; Denver, Colorado, U.S.
- Died: June 10, 1995 (aged 76); Taos, New Mexico, U.S.
- Occupations: Choreographer, dancer

Ernest Orville Flatt (October 30, 1918 – June 10, 1995) was an American choreographer and dancer. He won a Primetime Emmy Award and was nominated for six more in the category Outstanding Choreography for his work on the television program The Carol Burnett Show. As a choreographer he also won a Christopher Award and a Golden Rose. Flatt was also nominated for two Tony Awards in the categories Best Direction of a Musical and Best Choreography.

== Life and career ==
In his younger years, Flatt worked on Broadway, staging the dances and musical numbers in It's a Bird... It's a Plane... It's Superman (1966), and in motion pictures such as An American in Paris (1951), Singing' in the Rain (1952), and White Christmas (1954). Later, he turned to television where he had more success choreographing adaptations of Broadway musicals. Flatt worked with Judy Garland, and with Carol Burnett on her series The Carol Burnett Show.

Flatt died in June 1995 of an aortic hemorrhage in Taos, New Mexico, at the age of 76.
