= Don Crichton =

American dancer

Don Crichton is a dancer and choreographer who was the lead dancer on The Carol Burnett Show. As a choreographer he was nominated for Emmy Awards in 1981 and 1993, and his work includes choreographing the 2003 Kennedy Center Honors.
