= List of awards and nominations received by Seth Rogen =

Seth Rogen awards and nominations
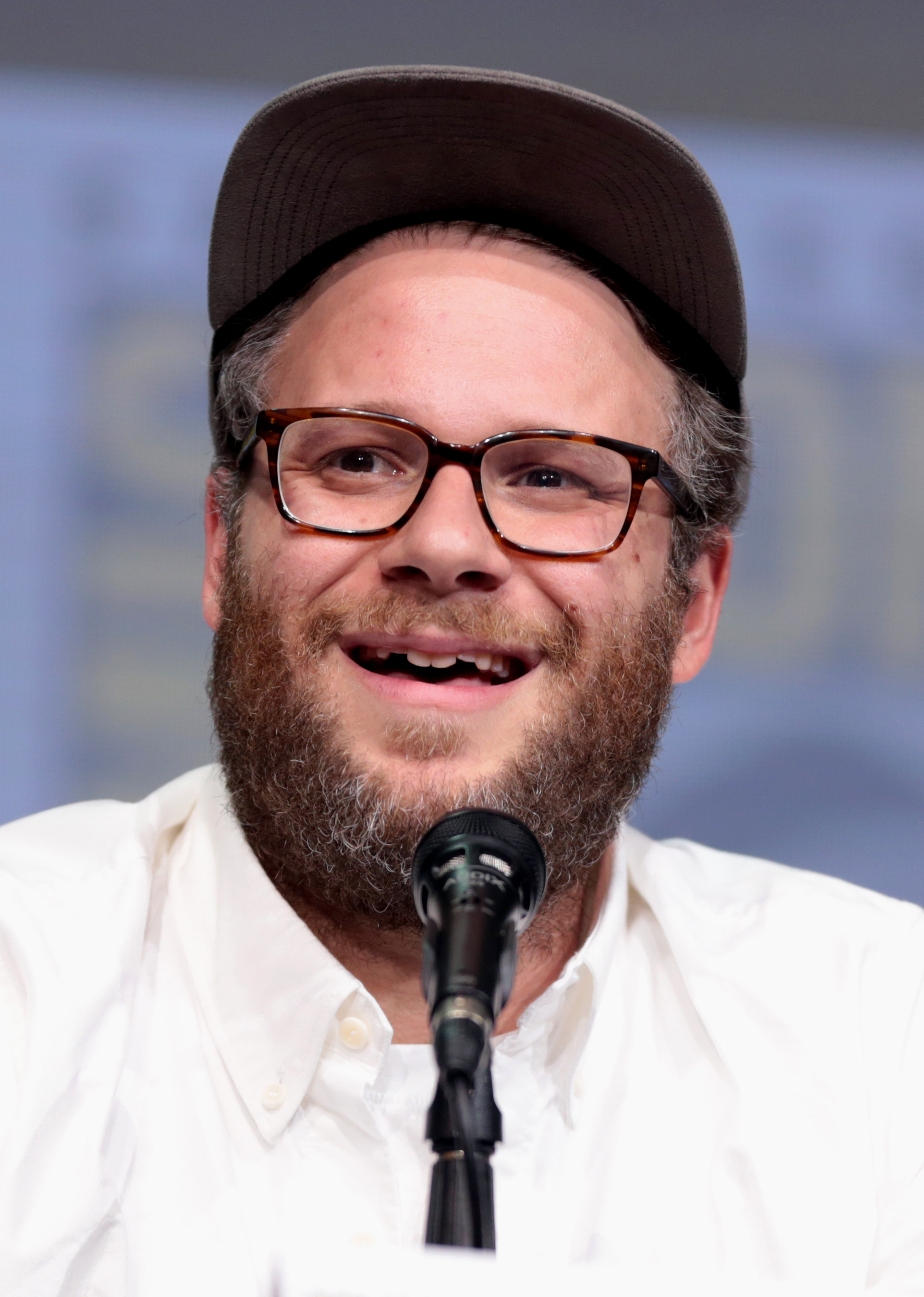
- Rogen in 2017
Awards and nominations
Award	Wins	Nominations
Actor Awards	2	3
British Academy Television Awards	1	1
Critics' Choice Awards	2	2
DGA Awards	1	1
Emmy Awards	5	10
Golden Globe Awards	1	2
PGA Awards	1	3
WGA Awards	1	3

Totals (Note: Certain award groups do not simply award one winner. They acknowledge several different recipients, have runners-up, and have third place. Since this is a specific recognition and is different from losing an award, runner-up mentions are considered wins in this award tally. For simplification and to avoid errors, each award in this list has been presumed to have had a prior nomination.)
- Wins: 25
- Nominations: 66

Seth Rogen is a Canadian actor, writer, and producer of film and television. He won five Primetime Emmy Awards, two Screen Actors Guild Awards, a Golden Globe Award, a Producers Guild of America Awards, a Writers Guild of America Award, and a Directors Guild of America Award.

Rogen started his career as a comedy writer on the British satirical sketch comedy series Da Ali G Show (2004) for which he was nominated for the Primetime Emmy Award for Outstanding Writing for a Variety Series. Rogen then established himself as a leading man in a string of successful and often raunchy comedy films The 40-Year-Old Virgin (2005), Knocked Up (2007), Superbad (2007), Pineapple Express (2008), Zack and Miri Make a Porno (2008), Funny People (2009), This is the End (2013), Neighbors (2014), The Interview, The Night Before (2015), and The Disaster Artist (2017).

Rogen has also taken dramatic roles in Sarah Polley's romance drama Take This Waltz (2011), Jonathan Levine's comedy-drama 50/50 (2011), Danny Boyle's historical drama Steve Jobs (2015), and Steven Spielberg's semi-autobiographical coming-of-age drama The Fabelmans (2022), the later of earning him a nomination for the Screen Actors Guild Award for Outstanding Cast in a Motion Picture. He has voiced roles in Shrek the Third (2007), Horton Hears a Who! (2008), Kung Fu Panda film series (2008-2016), Monsters vs. Aliens (2009), The Lion King (2019), and The Super Mario Bros. Movie (2023).

On television, Rogen has expanded his career working as a producer on a variety of projects. He produced the Amazon Prime Video black comedy superhero series The Boys earning a nomination for the Primetime Emmy Award for Outstanding Drama Series in 2021. He portrayed Rand Gautier in the Hulu limited series Pam & Tommy (2022), for which he was nominated for the Primetime Emmy Award for Outstanding Supporting Actor in a Limited or Anthology Series or Movie and the Golden Globe Award for Best Supporting Actor – Series, Miniseries or Television Film. He also served as a producer on the series earning a nomination for the Primetime Emmy Award for Outstanding Limited or Anthology Series.

== Major associations ==
=== Actor Awards ===
Year	Category	Nominated work	Result	Ref.
2022	Outstanding Performance by a Cast in a Motion Picture	The Fabelmans	Nominated	
2026	Outstanding Performance by a Male Actor in a Comedy Series	The Studio	Won	
2026	Outstanding Performance by an Ensemble in a Comedy Series	The Studio	Won	

=== BAFTA Awards ===
Year	Category	Nominated work	Result	Ref.
British Academy Television Awards
2026	Best International Programme	The Studio	Won	

=== Emmy Awards ===
Year	Category	Nominated work	Result	Ref.
Primetime Emmy Awards
2005	Outstanding Writing for a Variety, Music or Comedy Program	Da Ali G Show	Nominated	
2021	Outstanding Drama Series	The Boys	Nominated	
2022	Outstanding Limited or Anthology Series	Pam & Tommy	Nominated	
2022	Outstanding Supporting Actor in a Limited Series or Movie	Pam & Tommy	Nominated	
2022	Outstanding Short Form Animated Program	The Boys Presents: Diabolical (episode: "John and Sun-Hee")	Nominated	
2025	Outstanding Comedy Series	The Studio	Won	
2025	Outstanding Lead Actor in a Comedy Series	The Studio (episode: "The Pediatric Oncologist")	Won	
2025	Outstanding Directing for a Comedy Series	The Studio (episode: "The Oner")	Won	
2025	Outstanding Writing for a Comedy Series	The Studio (episode: "The Promotion")	Won	
2026	Outstanding Variety Special (Pre-Recorded)	The Muppet Show	Won	

=== Golden Globe Awards ===
Year	Category	Nominated work	Result	Ref.
2023	Best Supporting Actor – Television Limited Series/Motion Picture	Pam & Tommy	Nominated	
2026	Best Television Series – Musical or Comedy	The Studio	Won	
2026	Best Actor in a Television Series – Musical or Comedy	The Studio	Won	

== Guild awards ==
=== Directors Guild of America Awards ===
Year	Category	Nominated work	Result	Ref.
2026	Outstanding Directorial Achievement in Comedy Series	The Studio (episode: "The Oner")	Won	

=== Producers Guild of America Awards ===
Year	Category	Nominated work	Result	Ref.
2023	Outstanding Limited Series Television	Pam & Tommy	Nominated	
2024	Outstanding Animated Motion Picture	Teenage Mutant Ninja Turtles: Mutant Mayhem	Nominated	
2026	Best Episodic Comedy	The Studio	Won	

=== Writers Guild of America Awards ===
Year	Category	Nominated work	Result	Ref.
2026	Comedy Series	The Studio	Won	
2026	New Series	The Studio	Nominated	
2026	Episodic Comedy	The Studio (episode: "The Promotion")	Nominated	

== Critics awards ==
Organizations	Year	Category	Work	Result	Ref.
Critics' Choice Awards	2014	Best Comedy	This Is The End	Nominated	
Critics' Choice Awards	2023	Best Movie/Miniseries	Pam & Tommy	Nominated	
Critics' Choice Awards	2024	Best Animated Feature	Teenage Mutant Ninja Turtles: Mutant Mayhem	Nominated	
Critics' Choice Awards	2025	Best Animated Series	Invincible	Nominated	
Critics' Choice Awards	2026	Best Comedy Series	The Studio	Won	
Critics' Choice Awards	2026	Best Actor in a Comedy Series	The Studio	Won	
Critics' Choice Super Awards	2021	Best Superhero Series	The Boys	Won	
Critics' Choice Super Awards	2023	Best Superhero Series, Limited Series or Made-for-TV Movie	The Boys	Won	
Critics' Choice Super Awards	2024	Best Superhero Movie	Teenage Mutant Ninja Turtles: Mutant Mayhem	Nominated	
Critics' Choice Super Awards	2025	Best Superhero Series, Limited Series or Made-for-TV Movie	The Boys	Nominated	
Dallas–Fort Worth Film Critics Association	2011	Best Film	50/50	Nominated	
Denver Film Critics Society	2013	Best Comedy Film	This Is The End	Won	
Dublin Film Critics Circle	2007	Breakthrough Award	Knocked Up	Nominated	
Vancouver Film Critics Circle	2011	Best Supporting Actor in a Canadian Film	Take This Waltz	Nominated	
Women Film Critics Circle	2015	Merry Macho Award	The Interview	Won	

== Miscellaneous awards ==
Organizations	Year	Category	Work	Result	Ref.
American Comedy Awards	2014	Funniest Motion Picture	This Is the End	Won	
American Comedy Awards	2014	Best Comedy Actor – Film	This Is the End	Nominated	
American Comedy Awards	2014	Best Comedy Director – Film	This Is the End	Won	
American Comedy Awards	2014	Best Comedy Screenplay	This Is the End	Nominated	
Annie Awards	2024	Outstanding Writing in an Animated Feature Production	Teenage Mutant Ninja Turtles: Mutant Mayhem	Nominated (Note: Shared with Evan Goldberg, Jeff Rowe, Dan Hernandez, and Benji Samit)	
Astra TV Awards	2025	Best Actor in a Comedy Series	The Studio	Won	
Astra TV Awards	2025	Best Cast Ensemble in a Streaming Comedy Series	The Studio	Nominated	
Astra TV Awards	2025	Best Directing in a Comedy Series	The Studio (episode: "The Oner")	Won	
Astra TV Awards	2025	Best Writing in a Comedy Series	The Studio (episode: "The Promotion")	Nominated	
Canadian Comedy Award	2008	Best Writing (Film)	Superbad	Won	
Canadian Comedy Award	2008	Canadian Comedy Person of the Year	—N/a	Won	
Canadian Comedy Award	2009	Canadian Comedy Person of the Year	—N/a	Won	
Canadian Screen Awards	2025	Best Reality/Competition Program or Series	The Great Canadian Pottery Throw Down	Nominated	
Empire Award	2014	Best Comedy	This is the End	Nominated	
Golden Raspberry Award	2020	Worst Supporting Actor	Zeroville	Nominated	
Gotham Awards	2024	Breakthrough Comedy Series	Gen V	Nominated	
Gotham Awards	2025	Breakthrough Comedy Series	The Studio	Won	
Independent Spirit Awards	2011	Best Feature Film	50/50	Nominated	
MTV Movie Award	2006	Best On-Screen Team	The 40-Year-Old Virgin	Nominated (Note: Shared with Steve Carell, Paul Rudd and Romany Malco)	
MTV Movie Award	2008	Best Comedic Performance	Knocked Up	Nominated	
MTV Movie Award	2008	Breakthrough Performance	Knocked Up	Nominated	
MTV Movie Award	2009	Best Fight	Pineapple Express	Nominated (Note: Shared with James Franco and Danny McBride)	
MTV Movie Award	2014	Best Fight	This Is the End	Nominated (Note: Shared with Jonah Hill and James Franco)	
MTV Movie Award	2014	Best Musical Sequence	This Is the End	Won	
MTV Movie Award	2015	Best Fight	Neighbors	Nominated (Note: Shared with Zac Efron)	
MTV Movie Award	2015	#WTF Moment	Neighbors	Won	
MTV Movie Award	2015	Best Musical Moment	Neighbors	Nominated	
MTV Movie Award	2015	Best On-Screen Duo	The Interview	Nominated (Note: Shared with James Franco)	
MTV Movie Award	2015	Best Kiss	The Interview	Nominated	
MTV Movie Award	2017	Best Comedic Performance	Sausage Party	Nominated	
Nickelodeon Kids' Choice Award	2010	Favorite Voice from an Animated Movie	Monsters vs. Aliens	Nominated	
Teen Choice Award	2007	Choice Movie: Chemistry	Knocked Up	Nominated	
Teen Choice Award	2009	Choice Movie Actor: Comedy	Observe and Report and Pineapple Express	Nominated	
People's Choice Award	2014	Favorite Comedic Movie	Neighbors	Nominated	
People's Choice Award	2014	Favorite Comedic Movie Actor	Neighbors	Nominated	
Satellite Awards	2007	Best Actor in a Motion Picture – Musical Or Comedy	Knocked Up	Nominated	
Satellite Awards	2007	High Times Stony Award	Stoner of the Year	Won	
Saturn Award	2014	Best Horror Film	This is the End	Nominated	
ShoWest	2007	Comedy Star of the Year	Knocked Up and Superbad	Won	
Young Artist Award	2000	Best Performance in a TV Series – Young Ensemble	Freaks and Geeks	Nominated	
Young Artist Award	2014	Best Cast Chemistry–Film	Neighbors	Nominated	
Young Artist Award	2014	Best Bromance	—N/a	Nominated	
