= CinemaCon (The Studio) =

- The Studio episode
- Episode no.: Season 1 Episode 9
- Directed by: Seth Rogen; Evan Goldberg
- Written by: Alex Gregory
- Cinematography by: Adam Newport-Berra
- Editing by: Eric Kissack
- Original air date: May 14, 2025
- Running time: 35 minutes

Guest appearances
- Matthew Belloni as Himself; Bryan Cranston as Griffin Mill; Dave Franco as Himself; Zoë Kravitz as Herself; Keyla Monterroso Mejia as Petra; Courtney Pauroso as Gemma; Dewayne Perkins as Tyler; Rhea Perlman as Matt's Mom; Nicholas Stoller as Himself

Episode chronology
← Previous "The Golden Globes"	Next → "The Presentation"

"CinemaCon" is the ninth episode of the American satirical comedy television series The Studio. The episode was written by series co-creator Alex Gregory, and directed by series co-creators Seth Rogen and Evan Goldberg. It was released on Apple TV+ on May 14, 2025.

The series follows Matt Remick, the newly appointed head of the film production company Continental Studios. He attempts to save the floundering company in an industry undergoing rapid social and economic changes. In the episode, Matt and the crew prepare to attend CinemaCon, but Griffin informs him of some shocking news.

The episode received positive reviews from critics, who praised the episode's humor, writing and guest performances. At the 77th Primetime Emmy Awards, the episode won Outstanding Contemporary Costumes and Outstanding Guest Actor in a Comedy Series for Cranston.

== Plot ==
Matt dines with his mother, who does not support much of his ideas, as he prepares to leave soon for CinemaCon. Outside the restaurant, Matt meets with a woman who is friends with Dave Franco, who sells him mushrooms for his trip.

In Las Vegas, Matt tells Sal and Quinn that he is going to use mushrooms during the stay and wants them to join them. While rehearsing their presentation, Matt meets with Griffin in the aisle. Griffin reveals that he is not 65 years old, he is actually 82 years old, and has been concerned about an incoming sale to Amazon, which would lead to massive changes and lay-offs. Matt reassures Griffin that their upcoming presentation will lift Continental Studios' perception. At Matt's hotel suite pre-event party, the staff notes Griffin acting erratically with Franco, realizing they ate mushrooms. Matt is finally forced to reveal news about the possible sale, but claims that he has the situation under control.

Matt tries to get the party over so he can get Griffin out before he worsens the situation, but is shocked to find that Zoë Kravitz is attending the party. She eats some of the chocolate, finding too late that they are dosed with mushrooms. As the effects begin to kick in, they are forced to keep her in a room while they search for Griffin. They find him outside a casino near a canal, realizing he is too high to participate at CinemaCon. As Matt reiterates that Griffin will not miss the presentation, Griffin accidentally falls into a gondola. As the staff tries to get to him, Griffin makes his way to the Venetian, where he finds Patty. Griffin offends Patty, expressing pleasure in having fired her. After he leaves, Patty asks a stranger to borrow his phone, and subsequently calls Matthew Belloni to come to the Venetian for a big story, planning to expose Griffin's behavior.

== Production ==
=== Development ===
The episode was written by series co-creator Alex Gregory, and directed by series co-creators Seth Rogen and Evan Goldberg. It marked Gregory's fifth writing credit, and the ninth directing credit for both Rogen and Goldberg.

=== Writing ===
Kathryn Hahn described the episode, "They're basically trying to keep [themselves] from drowning at every moment; they're scared of losing their jobs and losing everything. Films are their entire lives, and the people they work with are basically their families and their social lives. That idea sounded really fun with this group of people. I also knew it was going to be an ensemble, and that’s always such a fun place to be in comedy."

=== Casting ===
On his guest appearance, Dave Franco commented, "I was embracing it all. I don't think there was anything where I was like, "I would never do that or say that." I think that's part of the fun of it is again, playing a version of yourself that is so far from reality that it just gives you a lot of leeway to have fun and be as insane as possible. And I'm someone who doesn't generally get very f---ed up ever, or go to Vegas very much, or do literally anything that I'm doing in this episode. And so that's the fun of it all: trying things that I don't generally do."

Zoë Kravitz, who previously used mushrooms in real life, said that she was "really trying to make it as accurate as possible." She added, "I thought, ‘The more serious and the more chill I am, the funnier it will be,’ so I was just using that to know if that's where he's going to be, I'm going to be the opposite of that. It was so fun. I mean, the hardest thing, honestly, is to not laugh and to not break. You don't want to be that guy." Executive producer Peter Huyck said that they asked Kravitz to return after being impressed with her appearance in the previous episode, "you need a few celebrities coming to present films at CinemaCon, and we're like, “I think she would be as funny as anyone having a problem with CinemaCon.” She gets to play a much bigger comedic part than she did in the Golden Globes episode."

== Critical reviews ==
"CinemaCon" received positive reviews from critics. Brian Tallerico of The A.V. Club gave the episode a "B–" grade and wrote, "It's all so remarkably ludicrous, but the chaos doesn’t build like the best episodes of The Studio as much as scream at viewers for 20 to 25 minutes. As soon as the drugs kick in, this episode is non-stop, loud idiocy, which leads to some funny bits but nowhere near the intellectual hum of the top installments of the first season. It's kind of insane to say that an episode this funny is the season's weak point, but here we are."

Keith Phipps of Vulture gave the episode a 4 star rating out of 5 and wrote, "What a chaotic episode. But, like the rest of the season, it's controlled chaos in the service of a bunch of well-orchestrated comic set pieces. At this point it's barely even notable when The Studio pulls off a scene as difficult as the mid-episode party sequence. It's still pretty impressive, though."

Ben Sherlock of Screen Rant wrote, "The everyone's on drugs conceit can get old fast. It's also not particularly interesting to watch people get high. But The Studio makes it work, because it’s not just using a shroom binge for some psychedelic humor; the humor comes from the fact that everyone who's tripping is a couple of hours away from going on stage in front of hundreds of people to salvage their company and save their jobs. Plus, it never feels one-note because every guest star has their own distinctive version of a bad trip." Roma Dean wrote gave the episode a 9 out of 10 rating and deemed it "Laughter riot filled with Hollywood's absurd power-dynamics, and lots of shrooms, the perfect near end to the series."

== Awards and nominations ==
Award	Year	Category	Recipient(s)	Result	Ref.
Costume Designers Guild Awards	2026	Excellence in Contemporary Television	Kameron Lennox and Tyler Kinney	Won	
Creative Arts Emmy Awards	2025	Outstanding Contemporary Costumes for a Series	Kameron Lennox, Betsy Glick, and Tyler Kinney	Won	
Creative Arts Emmy Awards	2025	Outstanding Contemporary Hairstyling	Vanessa Price, Alexandra Ford, and Lauren McKeever	Nominated	
Creative Arts Emmy Awards	2025	Outstanding Guest Actor in a Comedy Series	Bryan Cranston	Won	
Creative Arts Emmy Awards	2025	Outstanding Guest Actor in a Comedy Series	Dave Franco	Nominated	
