= The War (The Studio) =

- The Studio episode
- Episode no.: Season 1 Episode 5
- Directed by: Seth Rogen; Evan Goldberg
- Written by: Frida Perez
- Cinematography by: Adam Newport-Berra
- Editing by: Eric Kissack
- Original air date: April 16, 2025
- Running time: 30 minutes

Guest appearances
- Devon Bostick as Miles; Parker Finn as Himself; Owen Kline as Himself; Keyla Monterroso Mejia as Petra; Trevor Tordjman as Daniel

Episode chronology
← Previous "The Missing Reel"	Next → "The Pediatric Oncologist"

"The War" is the fifth episode of the American satirical comedy television series The Studio. The episode was written by series co-creator Frida Perez, and directed by series co-creators Seth Rogen and Evan Goldberg. It was released on Apple TV+ on April 16, 2025.

The series follows Matt Remick, the newly appointed head of the film production company Continental Studios. He attempts to save the floundering company in an industry undergoing rapid social and economic changes. In the episode, Quinn and Sal compete to get either Parker Finn or Owen Kline attached to direct a low-budget slasher film.

The episode received mostly positive reviews from critics, who praised the focus on Sal and Quinn, character development and Barinholtz's and Wonder's performances.

== Plot ==
Continental Studios buys a low-budget slasher film titled Wink, and Sal wants Matt to hire Parker Finn to direct it, believing it can be as successful as his Smile series. During this, Quinn is courting Owen Kline into directing another horror film for the studio. Matt is agitated by both pitches, but agrees that he will talk with both Finn and Kline. Sal tells Quinn that she cannot compete with him, warning her to step aside.

After talking with her boyfriend, Quinn decides to conspire against Sal. She cancels Finn's meeting with Matt, and he seizes the opportunity to have a lunch meeting with Chris Hemsworth. Knowing that Quinn did it, Sal crashes the meeting with Kline, and suggests studio pressure for Kline, causing him to panic and leave agitated. Quinn strikes back by stealing Sal's assistant Daniel's golf cart to block Sal's reserved parking spot, causing a series of mishaps that ruins Sal's suit and makes him miss a rescheduled meeting with Finn. This prompts Finn to leave, deciding to not work with Continental Studios.

Upset, Sal confronts Quinn, grabbing her burrito and throwing it at her. However, he instead hits a golf cart driver, causing him to crash and destroy part of a set, which Netflix was using to make a Waterloo miniseries. No one is injured, but HR conducts an investigation, with Matt looking to fire whoever was responsible. Learning this, Quinn is excited to finally expose Sal and take over his job. However, Sal cries, feeling that this will ruin his life. Quinn changes her mind and agrees to make a cover story for him, in exchange for his parking space and helping her greenlight more films. They return to the office, planning to look for new directors for Wink.

== Production ==
=== Development ===
The episode was written by series co-creator Frida Perez, and directed by series co-creators Seth Rogen and Evan Goldberg. It marked Perez's second writing credit, Rogen's fourth directing credit, and Goldberg's fourth directing credit.

=== Casting ===
Seth Rogen said that Parker Finn's casting was essential for the episode, "there's him and no one else. We needed the director of a horror franchise that is replicable in another, shittier way. And we were like, who does Smile? Parker Finn!" While they considered using M3GAN as a basis, they felt "it's not quite the same thing." Rogen specifically chose Finn because "he kept doing" Smile films, adding "If Parker Finn had said no, I don't know what we would have done."

== Critical reviews ==
"The War" received mostly positive reviews from critics. Brian Tallerico of The A.V. Club gave the premiere a "B+" grade and wrote, "The Studio uses the insecurities of Quinn and Sal for laughs, but it also takes the time to make them relatable as the young employee trying to carve her own path or the vet whose midlife crisis is warping his decision making. It's smart TV that's also way more empathetic than a lot of Hollywood myth debunking. How do movies get made? Because ordinary people put everything they have into getting them made."

Keith Phipps of Vulture gave the episode a 4 star rating out of 5 and wrote, "In some respects, it's a shame they couldn't see this from the start, but then we wouldn't have had this funny episode if they had. “The War” works well as commentary on the downside of being a cutthroat, even in a cutthroat industry." Ben Sherlock of Screen Rant wrote, "It's a bit disappointing that some main cast members are absent for entire episodes; Catherine O'Hara's Patty and Kathryn Hahn's Maya are both sorely missed. Nevertheless, Quinn and Sal make for a compelling comic duo, and “The War” has some huge slapstick laughs with Sal's antics, from the chili tray that gets spilled all over his suit to the thrown burrito that starts a chain reaction that destroys a film set. “The War” might be The Studio's least satirically focused episode yet, but it's also one of the show's funniest installments."
