= The Missing Reel =

- The Studio episode
- Episode no.: Season 1 Episode 4
- Directed by: Seth Rogen; Evan Goldberg
- Written by: Peter Huyck
- Cinematography by: Adam Newport-Berra
- Editing by: Eric Kissack
- Original air date: April 9, 2025
- Running time: 29 minutes

Guest appearances
- Larry Brown as Jean-Paul; Zac Efron as Himself; Olivia Wilde as Herself

Episode chronology
← Previous "The Note"	Next → "The War"

"The Missing Reel" is the fourth episode of the American satirical comedy television series The Studio. The episode was written by series co-creator Peter Huyck, and directed by series co-creators Seth Rogen and Evan Goldberg. It was released on Apple TV+ on April 9, 2025.

The series follows Matt Remick, the newly appointed head of the film production company Continental Studios. He attempts to save the floundering company in an industry undergoing rapid social and economic changes. In the episode, Matt and Sal must find a reel that went missing, as it could force the film to undergo extensive reshoots.

The episode received mostly positive reviews from critics, with Wilde earning praise for her comedic performance in the episode.

== Plot ==
While checking a preview for a film noir directed by Olivia Wilde and starring Zac Efron, Matt is informed that a film reel containing the third act is missing, with Sal suspecting that someone stole it because Matt canceled the film's wrap party due to budget limitations. Matt sets out to find it, not just because they would be forced to reshoot it, but because he fears that it might be leaked and prompt other directors to shoot in digital rather than using film stock.

The camera assistant tells Matt and Sal that Efron was seen near the trailer where the reels were kept, so Matt sneaks into Efron's trailer to find any possible evidence, discovering an envelope of cash in his trailer addressed to costume designer Evelyn. She retrieves it and exchanges it with a man with a wrist tattoo for a box, before leaving for the Chateau Marmont. Efron soon arrives, and while Sal claims he is leaving, Matt notices him returning. Matt sneaks into the hotel by pretending to be a waiter, confronting Efron and Sal. He realizes that the film's crew is actually having a secret wrap party Efron paid for out of his own pocket, and that neither Matt or Wilde were asked to attend because the crew is tired of them. He also finds that Evelyn's box is actually custom hats for the crew.

Matt informs Efron about the missing reel, and he warns that they must find it because he will be unavailable for reshoots. Matt and Sal reconcile and decide to take a few drinks. They find a man with the wrist tattoo, but realize other extras had it, including Wilde. Remembering that Efron said Wilde was unhappy with the sequence, they deduce she stole the reel. They confront her at the set, and she reveals she has the reel in her bag. She disliked the sequence as Matt did not give them a proper budget and stole it to force him to cede but also kept the reel because she loves her own cameo. After giving chase, Sal takes the reel but is accidentally hit by a car. Wilde retrieves it and then deliberately destroys the reel by rolling it downhill, devastating Matt. In his narration, Matt reveals that he had to sell his Corvette to Efron for $2 million for reshoots to avoid being sued by Wilde for breach of contract.

== Production ==
=== Development ===
The episode was written by series co-creator Peter Huyck, and directed by series co-creators Seth Rogen and Evan Goldberg. It marked Huyck's third writing credit, Rogen's fourth directing credit, and Goldberg's fourth directing credit.

=== Casting ===
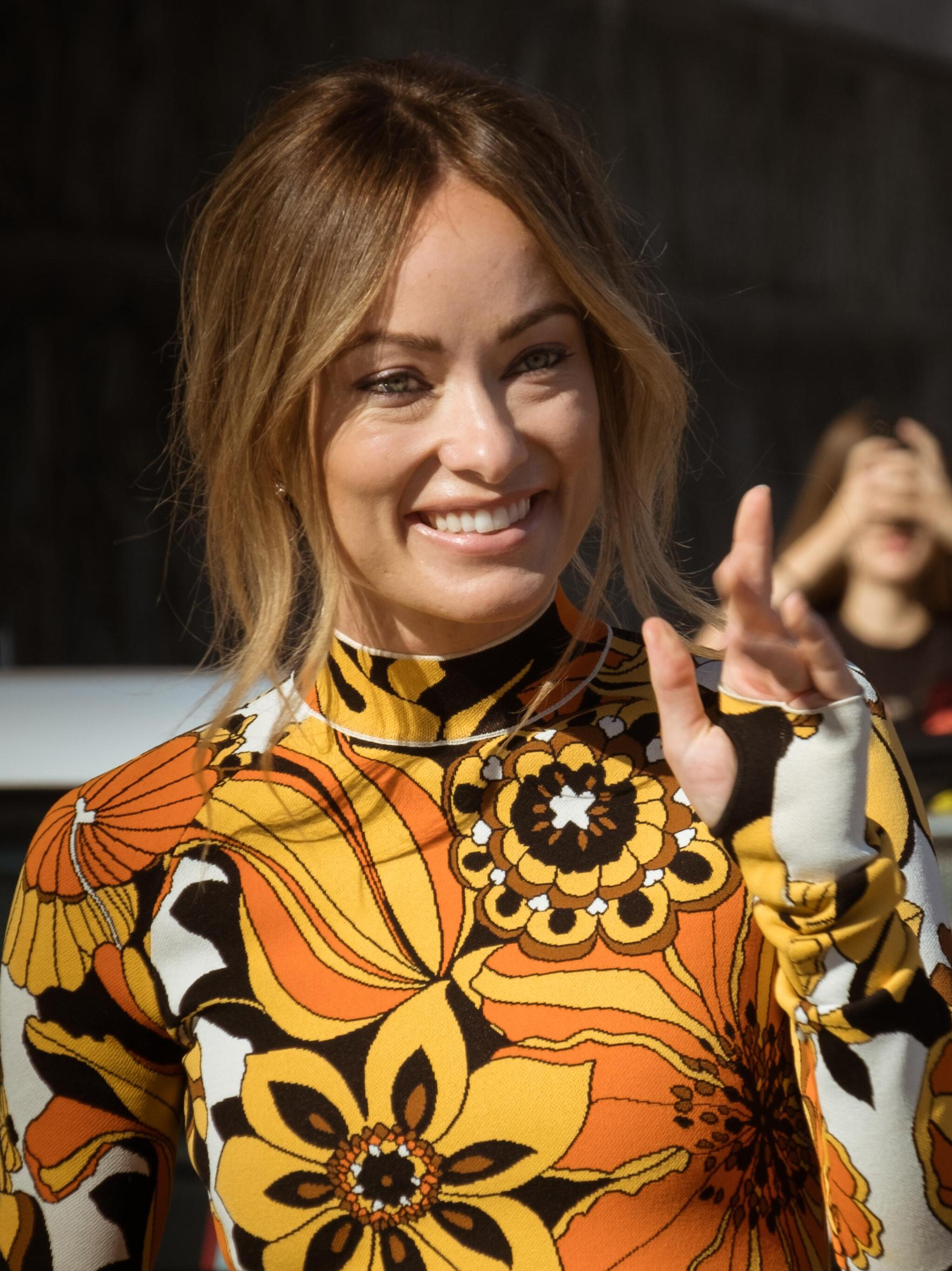
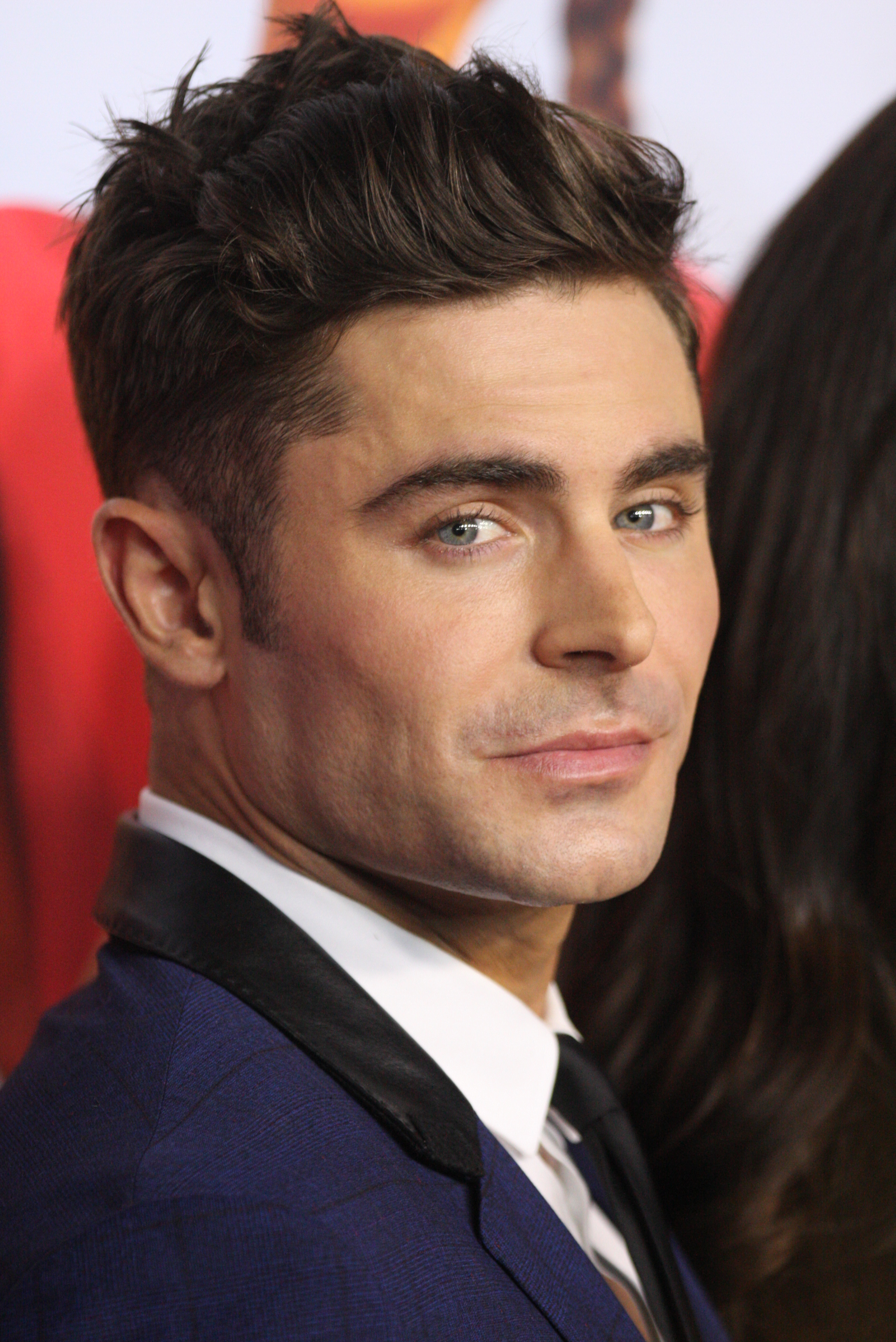
Olivia Wilde and Zac Efron guest star in the episode as themselves.

Seth Rogen was interested in having Olivia Wilde play a more agitated version of herself, "With Olivia, again, it was a funny thing of modulating how unlikable she was, and how much the crew was teaming up [against her.] And as a director, it's not an easy joke to portray: my standards are so high that they're causing people to turn on me." Evan Goldberg said they "had to meet her and convince her to do it and work on the character with her" in order to get her as a guest star.

== Critical reviews ==
"The Missing Reel" received mostly positive reviews from critics. Brian Tallerico of The A.V. Club gave the premiere a "B+" grade and wrote, "For almost any other comedy, the fourth episode of The Studio would be a standout. It has sharp guest performances, a clever structure, and even something relevant to say about the changing landscape on which movies are made in the 2020s. And yet the first three chapters of The Studio were so laugh-out-loud funny and visually striking that there's a sense that this is the episode in which Seth Rogen and Evan Goldberg's show settles into itself a little bit. They can't all be all-timers. And this is still a funny half-hour of television, proof perhaps that The Studio will be one of the smartest shows of 2025."

Keith Phipps of Vulture gave the episode a 4 star rating out of 5 and wrote, "“The Missing Reel” is not a serious episode, or no more serious than its predecessors, but it's not without stakes. Film is just barely hanging on as an option for the directors who prefer it, and this sort of disaster could be the excuse the industry needs to give up on the medium forever."

Emma Fraser of The Daily Beast praised Wilde's guest appearance, "There is already a blown-out-of-proportion tabloid version of Olivia stemming from Don't Worry Darling, and this portrayal highlights that Wilde has a sense of humor without having to do a play-by-play repeat of reality." Ben Sherlock of Screen Rant wrote, "Although there are some issues with the episode's noir gimmick, “The Missing Reel” builds to a hilarious ending. The shot of the film reel unspooling down the road, captured with expert precision by a moving camera, paired with Jerry Goldsmith's iconic Chinatown score, is a beautifully cinematic image."

== Accolades ==
Award	Year	Category	Recipient	Result	Ref.
Creative Arts Emmy Awards	2025	Outstanding Music Composition for a Series (Original Dramatic Score)	Antonio Sánchez	Nominated	
