= Casting (The Studio) =

- The Studio episode
- Episode no.: Season 1 Episode 7
- Directed by: Seth Rogen; Evan Goldberg
- Written by: Alex Gregory
- Cinematography by: Adam Newport-Berra
- Editing by: Eric Kissack
- Original air date: April 30, 2025
- Running time: 24 minutes

Guest appearances
- Ice Cube as Himself; Lil Rel Howery as Himself; Dewayne Perkins as Tyler; Nicholas Stoller as Himself; Ziwe Fumudoh as Herself

Episode chronology
← Previous "The Pediatric Oncologist"	Next → "The Golden Globes"

"Casting" is the seventh episode of the American satirical comedy television series The Studio. The episode was written by series co-creator Alex Gregory, and directed by series co-creators Seth Rogen and Evan Goldberg. It was released on Apple TV+ on April 30, 2025.

The series follows Matt Remick, the newly appointed head of the film production company Continental Studios. He attempts to save the floundering company in an industry undergoing rapid social and economic changes. In the episode, Matt and his staff prepare to announce the cast for the Kool-Aid Movie, but they begin to consider possible controversy over its casting.

The episode received mostly positive reviews from critics, who praised the episode's themes and bigger focus on its supporting cast.

== Plot ==
The poster for the Kool-Aid movie quickly goes viral, attaining the best engagement for Continental Studios in 5 years. They plan to unveil the film's cast at a convention the following day, with Ice Cube voicing the Kool-Aid Man. However, Maya tells Matt and Sal that Cube's casting might be problematic, as it could play into stereotypes of African-Americans.

They consult with Quinn over the casting choice, but she claims that while Kool-Aid is not associated with African-Americans, she associates it with poor people. They subsequently ask Ziwe Fumudoh and Lil Rel Howery for their opinion, and they support Cube's casting. However, they feel his wife should be played by an African-American, jeopardizing their plans to cast Sandra Oh. After replacing her with Regina King, they note that African-Americans are the only voice actors, while white actors play the human cast. Matt decides to bring in Don Cheadle and Keke Palmer to replace Josh Duhamel and Jessica Biel.

Matt meets with Nicholas Stoller and screenwriters Dev and Sandra to retool the film, telling them filming begins in 5 weeks. Stoller agrees to Matt's terms, but the screenwriters quit as they feel uncomfortable with the idea, feeling Black writers should write the film. Stoller decides to write the film himself, but tells Matt that he will ask an AI company to help him get the film ready on time and budget. As the team prepares to finally go forward with the film, they end up getting into another debate about the perception of having an all-Black cast, trying to come up with more alternatives to feel inclusive. Desperate, Matt visits Cube during a recording session to consult him over the casting. Cube argues over Matt's perception of trying to find possible stereotypes, as he finds no problem with it.

The next day, Matt and Stoller attend the convention to announce the cast for Kool-Aid Movie, confirming Ice Cube as the Kool-Aid Man. However, during a Q&A session, an attendee accuses Continental Studios of using AI for the film's artwork, prompting Stoller to walk off stage. Ice Cube is disgusted by the revelation and also abandons the stage, leaving Matt alone as he is booed by the crowd. Sal and Maya still view the presentation as a success, as no one in the audience brought up race.

== Production ==
=== Development ===
The episode was written by series co-creator Alex Gregory, and directed by series co-creators Seth Rogen and Evan Goldberg. It marked Gregory's third writing credit, Rogen's seventh directing credit, and Goldberg's seventh directing credit.

=== Casting ===
Seth Rogen admitted expressing fear when discussing the concept behind the episode to guest stars Ice Cube, Lil Rel Howery and Ziwe Fumudoh, "[it was] very reflective of the joke in the show themselves, where I'm trying to not be offensive and I'm trying to explain my creative position. And thank God people seem to get the joke as well But I was pretty nervous going into that episode."

== Critical reviews ==
"Casting" received mostly positive reviews from critics. Brian Tallerico of The A.V. Club gave the premiere a "B+" grade and wrote, "The seventh episode of The Studio tackles casting controversies in a clever way, basically highlighting how easily power players like Matt Remick can spin out of control with questions they're worried will have the wrong answer — to the point that they don't realize they're not asking the right questions in the first place."

Keith Phipps of Vulture gave the episode a 3 star rating out of 5 and wrote, "The setup is biting, particularly once Quinn adds that she doesn't think of Kool-Aid as a “Black-person drink” but a “poor-person drink.” After that, the episode gets a bit wheel-spinny. That doesn't make it a bad episode, just one that makes its best points right away and then never quite tops them with the succeeding variations."

Erik Kain of Forbes wrote, "It’s refreshing to see a show like The Studio poke fun at just how ridiculous the whole thing is behind the scenes, where out-of-touch executives, even with the best intentions, often make matters worse." Ben Sherlock of Screen Rant wrote, "I’ve enjoyed every episode of The Studio so far, but I've been a little disappointed by how few of them have taken advantage of the show's great ensemble. A lot of the episodes have focused solely on Matt, or only featured one or two supporting characters around him. Thankfully, “Casting” has the whole ensemble together, bickering about what constitutes racial insensitivity. It escalates to a really funny scene where all four main characters are trying to put together a cast that accurately reflects the racial demographics of the American population."
