= The Golden Globes (The Studio) =

- The Studio episode
- Episode no.: Season 1 Episode 8
- Directed by: Seth Rogen; Evan Goldberg
- Written by: Alex Gregory
- Cinematography by: Adam Newport-Berra
- Editing by: Eric Kissack
- Original air date: May 7, 2025
- Running time: 31 minutes

Guest appearances
- Lucia Aniello as Herself; Charli D'Amelio as Herself; Quinta Brunson as Herself; Paul W. Downs as Himself; Lisa Gilroy as Gabby; Zoë Kravitz as Herself; David Krumholtz as Mitch Weitz; Erin Moriarty as Herself; Rhea Perlman as Matt's Mom; Ted Sarandos as Himself; Adam Scott as Himself; Jean Smart as Herself; Zack Snyder as Himself; Aaron Sorkin as Himself; Antony Starr as Himself; Jen Statsky as Herself; Ramy Youssef as Himself

Episode chronology
← Previous "Casting"	Next → "CinemaCon"

"The Golden Globes" is the eighth episode of the American satirical comedy television series The Studio. The episode was written by series co-creator Alex Gregory, and directed by series co-creators Seth Rogen and Evan Goldberg. It was released on Apple TV+ on May 7, 2025.

The series follows Matt Remick, the newly appointed head of the film production company Continental Studios. He attempts to save the floundering company in an industry undergoing rapid social and economic changes. In the episode, Matt and his staff attend the Golden Globe Awards when one of their films is nominated, with Matt hoping to be thanked during the speech if they win.

The episode received highly positive reviews from critics, who praised its humor, performances, cameos, and production values. At the 77th Primetime Emmy Awards, the episode won Outstanding Sound Editing and Outstanding Sound Mixing.

== Plot ==
Matt arrives at the Golden Globe Awards, where one of his greenlit films, Open, is nominated for Best Motion Picture – Musical or Comedy. He hopes that the director, Zoë Kravitz, will thank him in her speech if she wins, although she states in an interview that she does not care much for awards.

Matt asks Patty, who produced Open, to convince Kravitz in thanking him if he wins, but she hesitates as it would feel desperate. When Adam Scott wins an award, he thanks Sal for letting him sleep on his couch 20 years ago. Upon winning, Quinta Brunson, Jean Smart, and Aaron Sorkin end up adding Sal's name to their speeches as a recurring joke, frustrating Matt. Desperate, Matt tries to dupe the teleprompter operator into adding his name to Kravitz's acceptance speech but she catches him, revealing she is actually serious about winning and will not change her well-rehearsed speech for Matt, despite his pleading that it would impress his mother. Upset, Kravitz decides to pull out from directing another film for Continental Studios. Matt pleads with Kravitz's agent, Mitch Weitz, to reconsider, offering her first-dollar gross on the new project.

In the bathroom, Matt runs into Ted Sarandos, who has been thanked by many of the winners. Sarandos reveals that he forces everyone to congratulate him through contracts, surprising Matt. Zack Snyder presents the Best Motion Picture – Musical or Comedy category, naming Open as the winner. Kravitz thanks Sal and Patty, and also surprises Matt by thanking him as well. However, her mic is cut off before naming him. As Kravitz and Patty celebrate their victory and Sal leaves for a party with Scott, Matt is called by his mother, who scolds him for not getting thanked. Kravitz apologizes for the mic incident, but agrees to stay on their planned project. Matt privately returns to his limo, asking the driver to take him home.

== Production ==
=== Development ===
The episode was written by series co-creator Alex Gregory, and directed by series co-creators Seth Rogen and Evan Goldberg. It marked Gregory's fourth writing credit, Rogen's eighth directing credit, and Goldberg's eighth directing credit.

=== Writing ===
Seth Rogen said that he was inspired by a real-life experience at the Golden Globe Awards. One of his films won an award, and during the afterparty, the crew saw an executive crying because no one thanked him during a speech. Rogen noted that "the person who it's based on knows that we made a whole episode about it and, in no uncertain terms, yelled at me very recently."

=== Casting ===
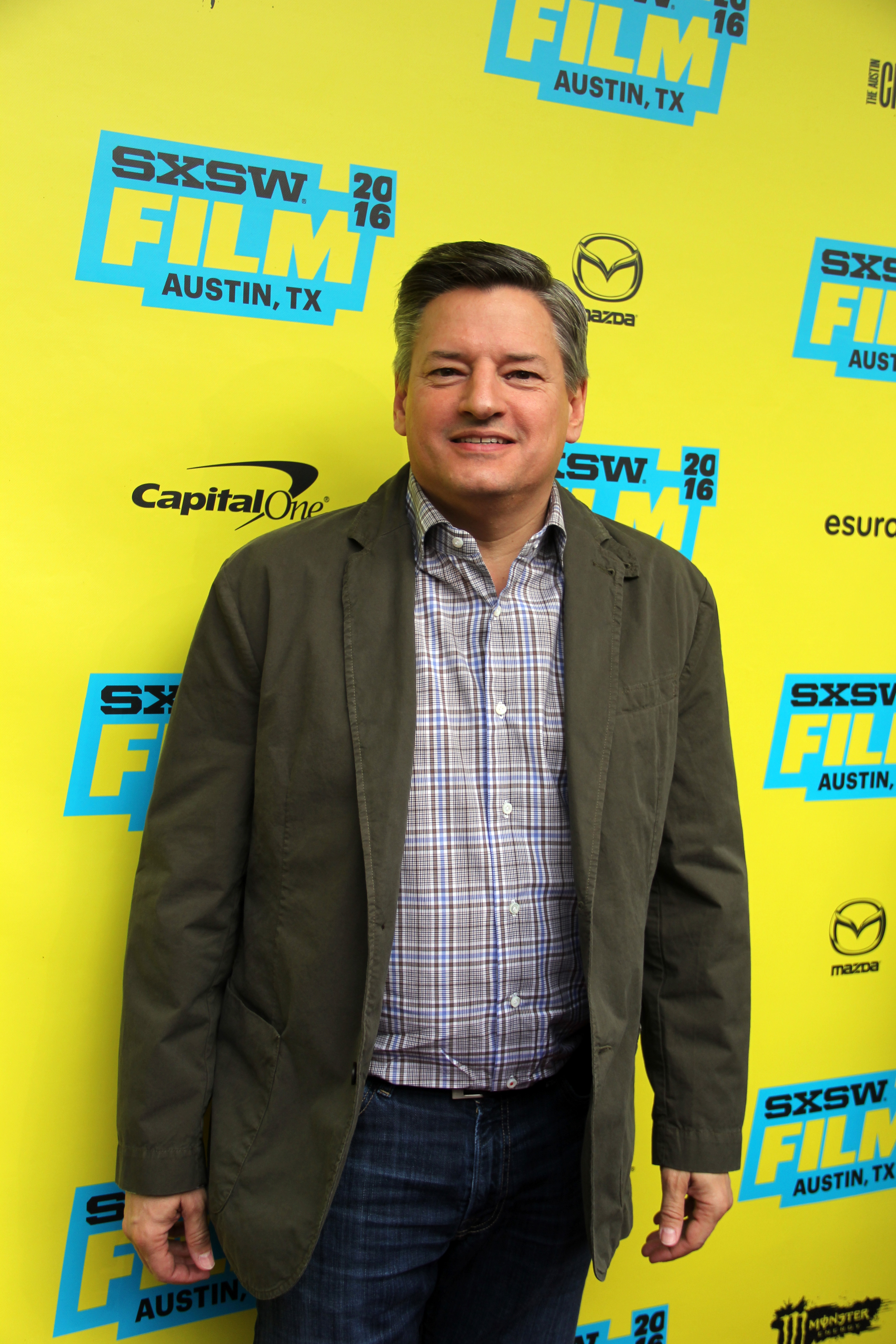
Ted Sarandos guest stars in the episode.

Ted Sarandos, co-chief executive officer of Netflix, makes a guest appearance as himself in the episode. Sarandos explained his decision to appear, "After 25 years in Hollywood, secretly what I was really hoping for was to be discovered for the silver screen. Of course it was my friend Seth Rogen who saw my ‘certain something’ and cast me. He has also promised an FYC campaign for my guest appearance — so it was an offer that I could not refuse." Rogen knew Sarandos for years, and admitted surprise that he agreed to guest star, adding "he's someone that I thought would relate to the joke of the show in a lot of ways, but is put in a position at times where people question their devotion to film."

=== Filming ===
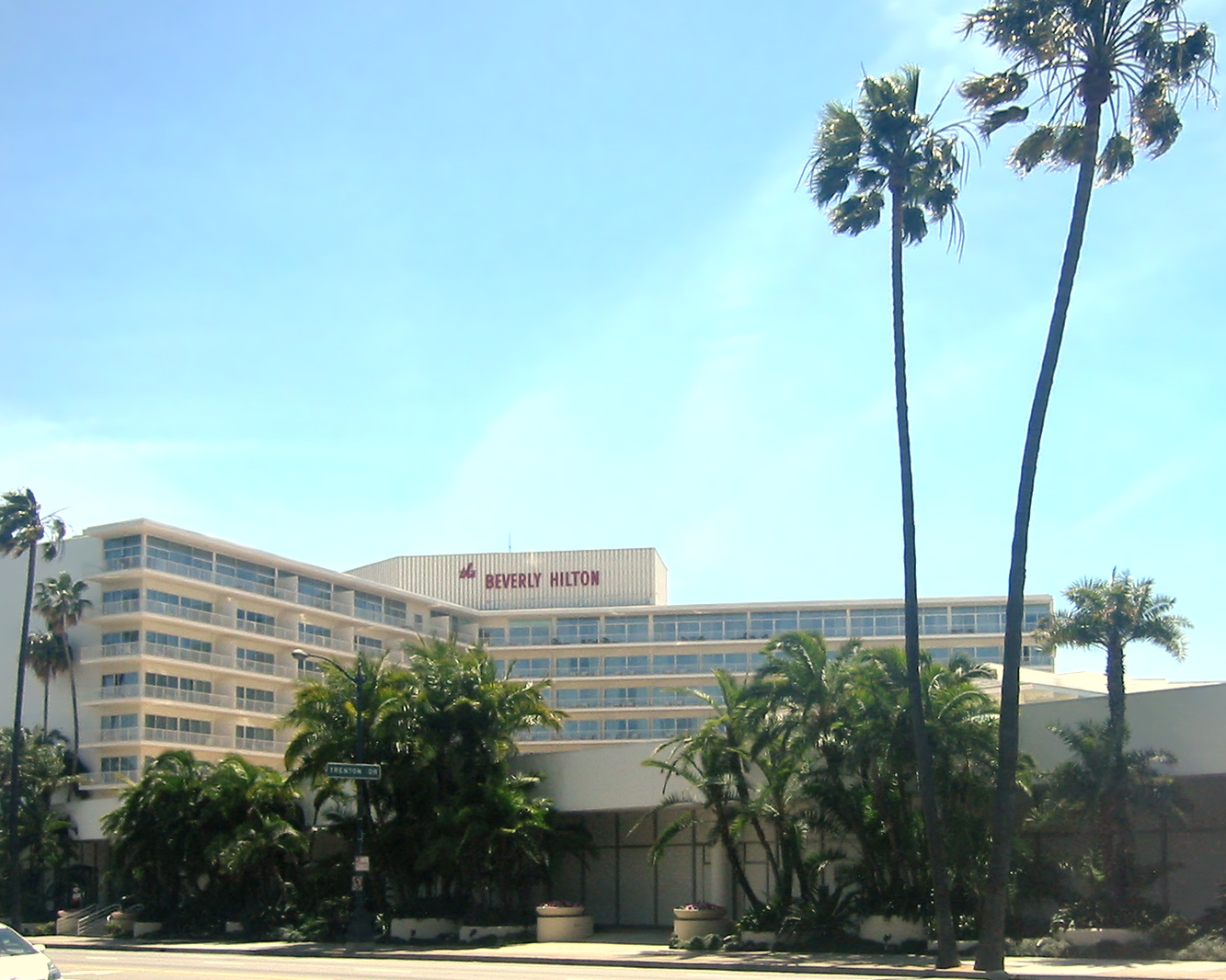
The episode was filmed in The Beverly Hilton, the real-life venue for the Golden Globes ceremony.

The episode was filmed in The Beverly Hilton, the real-life venue where the Golden Globes are hosted. While some producers and executives questioned the decision to film it as no one would tell the difference, Rogen insisted that it had to be filmed there, "I thought a cool part of the show is to really give people, whether they know it or not, what the experience of it is like." While the Golden Globes take two weeks to prepare for the ceremony's arrangements, the series only had 12 hours to build a replica of the ceremony, along with just four days to complete all their scenes. As the hotel was already undergoing a renovation project, the series could only start rehearsing and filming after 4pm.

The Globes made a few compromises with the series. One of these involved not allowing them to use their registed "Pink Carpet", forcing the series to change it to red. The series also had to create their own statues that would resemble the Golden Globes. Evan Goldberg said, "They let us do our thing and that was it. But it wasn't like, oh yeah, here's some statues and here's our from last year, here's our logo. We had to do it all ourselves." Rogen added, "We couldn't use it in marketing, and we had to remove some of the signage for some of the ads and stuff like that. But for the actual episode, they were comfortable with it. Which was shocking to me, honestly."

== Critical reviews ==
"The Golden Globes" received highly positive reviews from critics. Brian Tallerico of The A.V. Club gave the premiere a "B+" grade and wrote, "nothing compares to the eighth episode of The Studio, a chapter of television so dense with nods to the industry and its power players that it's hard to catch them all. It's an installment that further defines Seth Rogen's Matt Remick as a true Hollywood creature: someone who knows what to say in public even though he feels completely differently in private."

Keith Phipps of Vulture gave the episode a 4 star rating out of 5 and wrote, "There are still two episodes left in the season, but so far, the series has created a sense that Matt's tenure, which is filled with misadventures, is going pretty well. Sure, he made Martin Scorsese cry, ruined Sarah Polley's oner, and will probably have to think twice about working with Olivia Wilde again. But Continental Pictures' Remick era, at the very least, seems not to be an outright disaster. And, as “The Golden Globes” opens, Matt's helped shepherd at least one film of note into awards season: the Zoë Kravitz–directed Open." Laura Wheatman Hill of The Daily Beast wrote, "The Studio is a passionate love letter to and a brutal satire of Hollywood, and, to a lesser extent, movies and the experience of movie-watching. As such, its lampooning of Netflix could be seen as particularly pointed."

Jason Zinoman of The New York Times wrote, "By the end of the episode, the thought may cross your mind that the Golden Globes red carpet does stand for something. Even if it never did, it's in the grand tradition of show business to be nostalgic for something that didn't exist." Ben Sherlock of Screen Rant wrote, "This episode encapsulates The Studio's ingenious brand of satire; it simultaneously ridicules Matt's neediness and compassionately shows you where he's coming from. It's that compassion that makes the show work so well. If it was just straight-up mockery, The Studio wouldn't have this kind of staying power."

== Awards and nominations ==
Award	Year	Category	Recipient(s)	Result	Ref.
Astra TV Awards	2025	Best Writing in a Comedy Series	Alex Gregory	Nominated	
Cinema Audio Society Awards	2026	Outstanding Achievement in Sound Mixing for a Television Series – Half Hour	Lindsey Alvarez, Fred Howard, Brian Magrum, Ron Mellegers, Buck Robinson, and Adrià Serrano	Won	
Creative Arts Emmy Awards	2025	Outstanding Sound Editing for a Comedy or Drama Series (Half-Hour)	Lorena Perez Batista, Jason Charbonneau, Stefan Fraticelli, George Haddad, Justin Helle, Lloyd Stuart Martin, Borja Sau, and Randy Wilson	Won	
Creative Arts Emmy Awards	2025	Outstanding Sound Mixing for a Comedy or Drama Series (Half-Hour) and Animation	Lindsey Alvarez, Fred Howard, Ron Mellegers, and Buck Robinson	Won	
Golden Reel Awards	2026	Outstanding Achievement in Sound Editing – Broadcast Short Form	Brandon Bak, Jason Charbonneau, Stefan Fraticelli, George Haddad, Justin Helle, Lloyd Stuart Martin, Borja Sau, and Randy Wilson	Nominated	
