= The Promotion (The Studio) =

- The Studio episode
- Episode no.: Season 1 Episode 1
- Directed by: Seth Rogen; Evan Goldberg
- Written by: Seth Rogen; Evan Goldberg; Peter Huyck; Alex Gregory; Frida Perez
- Cinematography by: Adam Newport-Berra
- Editing by: Eric Kissack
- Original air date: March 26, 2025
- Running time: 44 minutes

Guest appearances
- Peter Berg as Himself; Steve Buscemi as Himself; Bryan Cranston as Griffin Mill; Paul Dano as Himself; David Krumholtz as Mitch Weitz; Keyla Monterroso Mejia as Petra; Dewayne Perkins as Tyler; Martin Scorsese as Himself; Nicholas Stoller as Himself; Charlize Theron as Herself

Episode chronology
← Previous —	Next → "The Oner"

"The Promotion" is the series premiere of the American satirical comedy television series The Studio. The episode was written by series creators Seth Rogen, Evan Goldberg, Peter Huyck, Alex Gregory and Frida Perez, and directed by Rogen and Goldberg. It was released on Apple TV+ on March 26, 2025.

The series follows Matt Remick, the newly appointed head of the film production company Continental Studios. He attempts to save the floundering company in an industry undergoing rapid social and economic changes. In this episode, Matt begins his first day as the head of Continental Studios and quickly encounters the realities of running a struggling production company. He is introduced to the studio's staff, navigates internal politics, and faces skepticism about his leadership. The episode focuses on his attempts to organize the studio's next project, a film adaptation centered on Kool-Aid, which becomes a source of both conflict and comedy.

The episode received highly positive reviews from critics, who praised its humor, technical execution, and performances, with particular acclaim for Martin Scorsese's guest appearance. At the 77th Primetime Emmy Awards, the episode won Outstanding Writing for a Comedy Series, Outstanding Music Supervision, and Outstanding Picture Editing for a Single-Camera Comedy Series.

== Plot ==
While visiting the set of a film directed by Peter Berg and starring Paul Dano, Continental Studios executive Matt Remick (Seth Rogen) tries to suggest a few ideas, all of which are brushed off by Berg. While Matt believes that films can have artistic integrity, he grows frustrated with the amount of IP-focused films greenlit.

Returning to the studio, his friend and co-worker Sal Saperstein (Ike Barinholtz) informs him that the studio head Patty Leigh (Catherine O'Hara) has been fired after a string of box office failures. He subsequently meets with the new CEO Griffin Mill (Bryan Cranston), who confirms Patty's firing and offers the new position to Matt. While Matt accepts, Griffin still has his reservations about Matt's artistic-focused approach to films, as he wants him to focus on making profitable movies. He has recently obtained the film rights to Kool-Aid and wants Matt to greenlight the film, which he reluctantly accepts.

At his first meeting, Matt tells his workers his plans to make an auteur-driven Kool-Aid movie, inspired by the success of Barbie. Matt and Sal meet with Mitch Weitz (David Krumholtz), a Hollywood agent, to get a director for the movie. Matt is disappointed that only Nicholas Stoller is interested, while other auteur directors are out of the table. After hearing Stoller's pitch, Sal likes his idea while Matt reluctantly goes with it before having a meeting with Martin Scorsese. Scorsese wants to make a film about the Jonestown massacre, but the studios are worried about its long-term prospects due to its massive $200 million budget. Remembering that the event is associated with "Drinking the Kool-Aid", Matt greenlights the film with a bigger budget, telling Scorsese that he simply needs to title it Kool-Aid, which he accepts.

The announcement prompts applause for Matt, but head of marketing Maya Mason (Kathryn Hahn) is shocked when she finds that Jonestown is actually the focus of the film and that Scorsese is eyeing Steve Buscemi to play Jim Jones. When Griffin asks about the film, Matt is forced to bring up Stoller's pitch, and Griffin is enthused. However, he has also learned about the Jonestown pitch and scolds Matt for greenlighting it, refusing to let it be associated with their Kool-Aid movie. Matt saves his position by claiming that he bought Scorsese's script to kill his project; by buying it, they will become the owners of the script, but will never shop it or make it. In an attempt to get Stoller back, Matt tells Mitch that Patty will be a producer on the Kool-Aid movie. Matt visits Patty, who agrees after bargaining a lucrative deal to produce her own movies; when Matt expresses fear that he is ruining film as an art form, Patty reassures him that he will do fine since he had the best teacher around.

Matt and Sal attend a party hosted by Charlize Theron, where they meet with Scorsese. They inform him that the film is canceled, with Scorsese deducing that the script cannot be shopped anywhere else. He has an emotional breakdown and starts crying, and an embarrassed Theron kicks Matt and Sal out. On their way out, they bump into Buscemi himself, who tells them Scorsese intended it to be his last film. They go to Matt's house, where they watch Goodfellas.

== Production ==
=== Development ===
The episode was written by series creators Seth Rogen, Evan Goldberg, Peter Huyck, Alex Gregory and Frida Perez, and directed by Rogen and Goldberg.

=== Casting ===
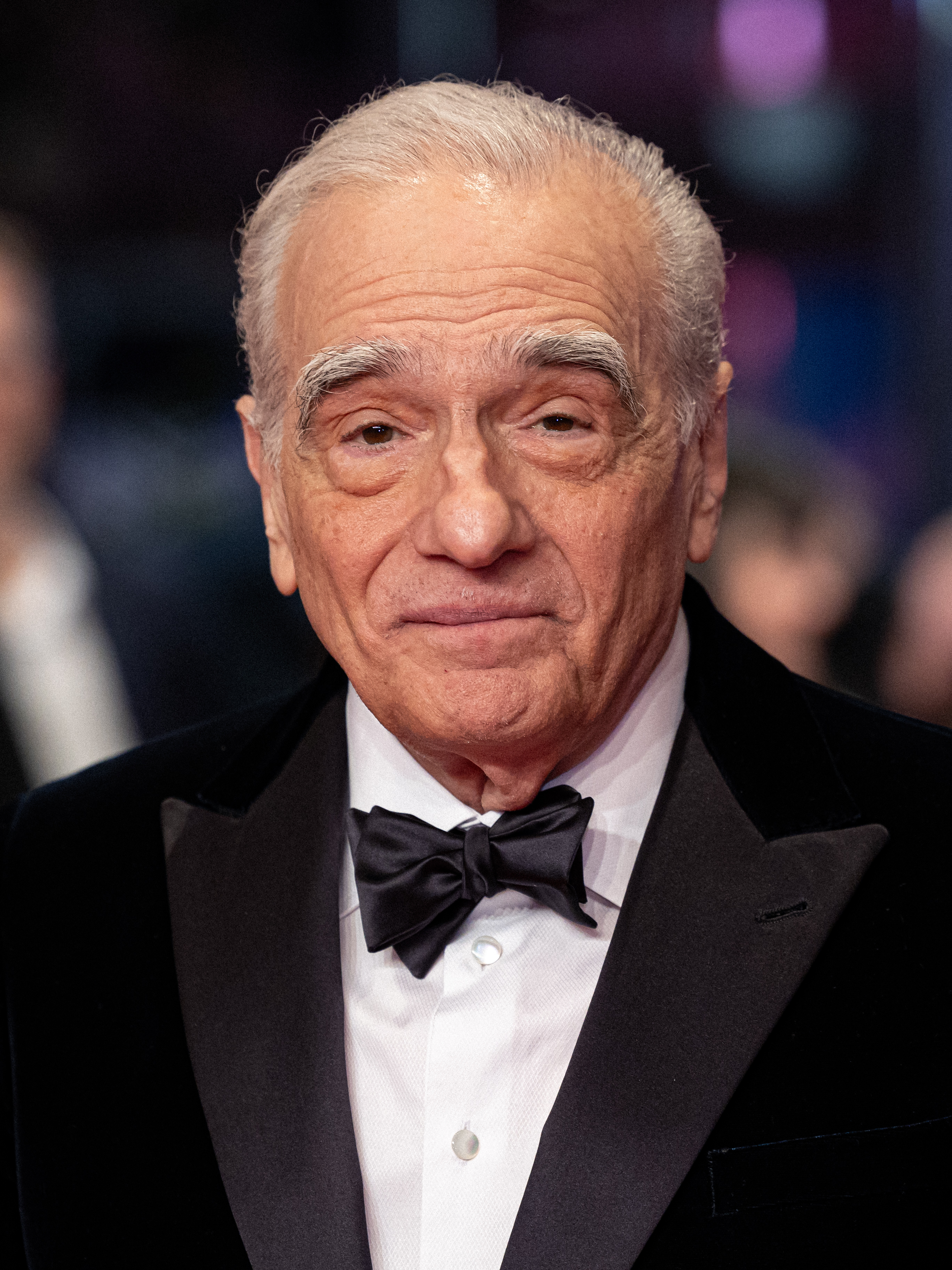
Martin Scorsese guest stars in the episode as himself.

The episode includes a guest appearance by Martin Scorsese, playing himself. According to Rogen, the cameos "had to all be people that served a very specific role in the stories." He said that when choosing Scorsese as guest star, he was looking for a director whom Matt would idolize and who would also make a film based on Jonestown, with Scorsese being the first name he considered. Goldberg said that Scorsese accepted the offer after reading the script, "[He] said he was in. We never met the man. It was a miracle." Describing his appearance, Scorsese stated, "It's so good it's painful; it's so truthful that it's painful." Executive producer James Weaver also mentioned that Scorsese's appearance helped open the doors for more guests in the series.

=== Filming ===
When Scorsese arrived on set, Rogen and Goldberg did not inform him that the series would consist of multiple oners in the episode. Rogen considered doing this as a very challenging experience, "Not only were we putting ourselves in a position where we had to direct Scorsese, but also we're shooting him in a very specific way, which is one of the hardest ways to perform." Fearing Scorsese would not like it, they hired a second camera crew.

== Critical reviews ==
"The Promotion" received highly positive reviews from critics. Brian Tallerico of The A.V. Club gave the premiere an "A–" grade and wrote, "There have been a number of behind-the-scenes comedies lately about how hard it is to make movies, but they too often mistake shallow references for actually writing jokes and characters. Luckily, that's not the case with The Studio. The truth is that none of these insider comedies have been as smart or as purely hysterical as this new Apple TV+ series."

Keith Phipps of Vulture gave the episode a 4 star rating out of 5 and wrote, "This first episode gets The Studio off to a promising start, throwing out sharp satirical points but letting Rogen's performance as Matt keep everything grounded in his sincere desire to be the kind of studio boss he dreamed of being."

Ben Sherlock of Screen Rant wrote, "The first episode's script does everything a good pilot should: it establishes who all the characters are, what their relationships are, and the world they inhabit, and has a ton of fun doing it." Nicole Gallucci of Decider wrote, "From start to finish, The Studio's first episode and its specific cameos are smart. But the show wouldn't have sold viewers nearly as hard, as fast without Scorsese's delightful acting, humor, and willingness to go all out."

== Awards and nominations ==
Award	Year	Category	Recipient(s)	Result	Ref.
ACE Eddie Awards	2026	Best Edited Single-Camera Comedy Series	Eric Kissack	Won	
Creative Arts Emmy Awards	2025	Outstanding Guest Actor in a Comedy Series	Martin Scorsese	Nominated	
Creative Arts Emmy Awards	2025	Outstanding Music Supervision	Gabe Hilfer	Won	
Creative Arts Emmy Awards	2025	Outstanding Picture Editing for a Single-Camera Comedy Series	Eric Kissack	Won	
Primetime Emmy Awards	2025	Outstanding Writing for a Comedy Series	Seth Rogen, Evan Goldberg, Peter Huyck, Alex Gregory, and Frida Perez	Won	
Writers Guild of America Awards	2026	Episodic Comedy	Seth Rogen, Evan Goldberg, Peter Huyck, Alex Gregory, and Frida Perez	Nominated	
