= The Note (The Studio) =

- The Studio episode
- Episode no.: Season 1 Episode 3
- Directed by: Seth Rogen; Evan Goldberg
- Written by: Seth Rogen; Evan Goldberg
- Cinematography by: Adam Newport-Berra
- Editing by: Eric Kissack
- Original air date: April 2, 2025
- Running time: 35 minutes

Guest appearances
- Dave Franco as Himself; Ron Howard as Himself; Anthony Mackie as Himself; Keyla Monterroso Mejia as Petra

Episode chronology
← Previous "The Oner"	Next → "The Missing Reel"

"The Note" is the third episode of the American satirical comedy television series The Studio. The episode was written and directed by series co-creators Seth Rogen and Evan Goldberg. It was released on Apple TV+ on April 2, 2025.

The series follows Matt Remick, the newly appointed head of the film production company Continental Studios. He attempts to save the floundering company in an industry undergoing rapid social and economic changes. In the episode, Matt struggles to tell Ron Howard that they need to cut the final 40 minutes of his newest film, as Howard did the sequence as a tribute to his dead cousin.

The episode received mostly positive reviews from critics, with Howard receiving praise for his performance, although Matt's characterization received a mixed response. At the 77th Primetime Emmy Awards, the episode won Outstanding Production Design for a Narrative Program (Half-Hour).

== Plot ==
Matt, Sal, Quinn, and Maya watch a preview screening of Ron Howard's new film Alphabet City, which stars Anthony Mackie and Dave Franco. They love the first 2 hours of the film but are left bored with the final 45 minutes of the film, which takes place solely at a motel. Maya tells Matt that he needs to get Howard to cut the final sequence, although Matt is reluctant, given Howard's status as the nicest celebrity in Hollywood.

When Howard visits the offices, Matt struggles to tell him about cutting the film, so he simply congratulates him. Patty informs Matt that the final sequence is important for Howard, as it is a tribute to his cousin who died young. Desperate, Matt gets Sal to pretend to have a dead cousin to give the feedback to Howard. He explains to his team that in 2001, he watched a preview of A Beautiful Mind and suggested revealing the lead character's schizophrenia at the very beginning. Howard hated the idea and insulted him in front of everyone, contrasting his image, but now seems to be unaware that Matt is the person who suggested it.

Sal reluctantly goes with the lie but backs off from asking for the cut when Howard tearfully explains his tribute. Mackie realizes that they dislike the final sequence, and while he also shares the feeling, he cannot bring himself to tell Howard. After movie theaters threaten to cut the film's amount of screenings due to its length, Matt is forced to give Howard the note in the marketing meeting. As he struggles to tell him, Howard reveals that he knows Matt was the person who made the suggestion for A Beautiful Mind and humiliates him again in front of everyone in the office. Matt snaps and openly belittles Howard for wasting the studio's money, and they nearly get in a fight. Later, Matt gets a call from Howard, who apologizes for his behavior, as he felt that Matt was right about his comment. Howard agrees to cut the motel sequence, but warns Matt that he will destroy his career if he ever crosses him again.

== Production ==
=== Development ===
The episode was written and directed by series co-creators Seth Rogen and Evan Goldberg. It marked their second writing credit, and third directing credit.

According to Rogen, the idea for the episode came from a real-life experience. While attending a test screening for Borat, he gave a note that nobody liked. He also said, "Larry David was in the back row and made fun of me."

=== Casting ===
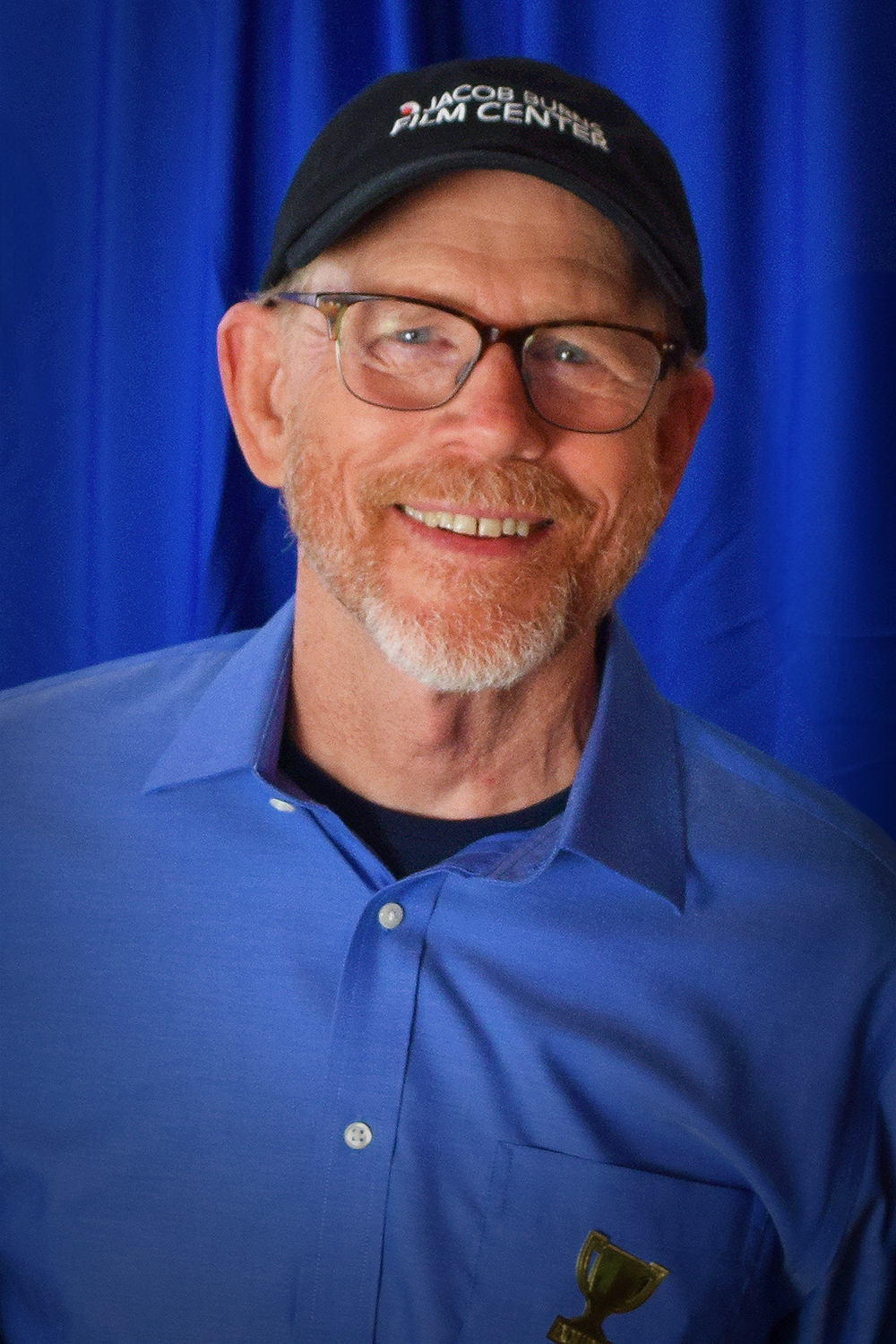
Ron Howard guest stars in the episode as himself.

The episode includes a guest appearance by Ron Howard, who plays a fictionalized version of himself. Evan Goldberg commented that Howard "was very determined to deliver a good performance. He had not acted in this manner in a very long time. He took some lessons. He really put his best foot forward."

Howard improvised the scene where he throws his patented Imagine hat at Matt, which Rogen loved, "for him to weaponize his trademark look was a really miraculously funny idea." Howard's daughter, Bryce Dallas Howard, was nervous over his appearance, as he had not acted in years. She accompanied him to film his scenes, describing herself as a "momager." She mentioned that when he did a rehearsal, he was "so on point everyone was sort of baffled by it, frankly."

=== Filming ===
To capture the conference room scene, the crew used a custom-built "donut table" - a hole cut in the center with hinged doors at either end. This allowed the camera operator to slide into the table during the long takes. The surface of the table was added back using VFX compositing.

== Critical reviews ==
"The Note" received mostly positive reviews from critics. Brian Tallerico of The A.V. Club gave the premiere an "A–" grade and wrote, "On the surface, it's just an episode about an awkward executive having to give a critical note to one of his idols, a reminder that the people paying to make movies sometimes get nervous around famous people too. But it's also about dueling traumas, one that comes from being ridiculed in a way that shaped Matt's entire career and one from a personal loss that may be blinding a director from seeing the flaw in his vision. Overall, it's a beautifully paced half hour of television, and an indication that this entire season might be pretty special."

Keith Phipps of Vulture gave the episode a 4 star rating out of 5 and wrote, "If Matt failed at every turn, The Studio would be merely cynical, instead of a series about someone with good intentions and a real love for movies doing the best he can in a job that might be beyond his abilities."

Ben Sherlock of Screen Rant wrote, "“The Note” isn't quite as tight as the previous two episodes, and its focus on just one story thread means it's not as complexly plotted as The Studio's previous installments, either. The conflict resolves a little too easily — shortly after a brief blowup, Matt and Ron bury the hatchet over a quick phone call — and there isn't one last punch like Charlize Theron kicking Matt out of her party or Matt's car blocking the best take of the oner. Still, it's a hilarious half-hour of television." Greg Wheeler of The Review Geek gave the episode a 2.5 star rating out of 5 and wrote, "episode 3 of The Studio completely contradicts Matt's character, in an episode that basically works in contrast to what we've seen in the previous episodes."

== Awards and nominations ==
Award	Year	Category	Recipient(s)	Result	Ref.
Art Directors Guild Awards	2026	Half-Hour Single-Camera Series	Julie Berghoff	Won	
Creative Arts Emmy Awards	2025	Outstanding Guest Actor in a Comedy Series	Ron Howard	Nominated	
Creative Arts Emmy Awards	2025	Outstanding Guest Actor in a Comedy Series	Anthony Mackie	Nominated	
Creative Arts Emmy Awards	2025	Outstanding Production Design for a Narrative Program (Half-Hour)	Julie Berghoff, Brian Grego, and Claire Kaufman	Won	
