= The Pediatric Oncologist =

- The Studio episode
- Episode no.: Season 1 Episode 6
- Directed by: Seth Rogen; Evan Goldberg
- Written by: Alex Gregory
- Cinematography by: Adam Newport-Berra
- Editing by: Eric Kissack
- Original air date: April 23, 2025
- Running time: 27 minutes

Guest appearances
- Sugar Lyn Beard as Rebecca Chan-Sanders; Rebecca Hall as Sarah; Josh Hutcherson as Himself; Arthur Keng as Steve Chan; Johnny Knoxville as Himself; Dewayne Perkins as Tyler; Jessica St. Clair as Leigh; Derek Wilson as Josh Fleisher

Episode chronology
← Previous "The War"	Next → "Casting"

"The Pediatric Oncologist" is the sixth episode of the American satirical comedy television series The Studio. The episode was written by series co-creator Alex Gregory, and directed by series co-creators Seth Rogen and Evan Goldberg. It was released on Apple TV+ on April 23, 2025.

The series follows Matt Remick, the newly appointed head of the film production company Continental Studios. He attempts to save the floundering company in an industry undergoing rapid social and economic changes. In this episode, Matt accompanies his girlfriend Sarah, a pediatric oncologist, to a hospital fundraiser. The storyline highlights the contrast between Sarah's medical profession and Matt's role as a studio executive, emphasizing the differing values and expectations of their careers. When Matt argues with Sarah's colleagues during the event, the conflict underscores the challenges of reconciling their professional worlds.

The episode received positive reviews from critics, with Rogen's performance singled out for praise. His work in this installment earned him a Primetime Emmy Award.

== Plot ==
Matt is dating a pediatric oncologist, Sarah. She convinces him to accompany her to the Ebell to attend a Cedars-Sinai Medical Center fundraiser to benefit children with cancer. Continental Studios previews Spike Jonze's new satirical film, Duhpocalypse!, starring Johnny Knoxville and Josh Hutcherson and featuring scatological humor. During the meeting, the staff and actors argue over the film's themes and tone, as it could conflict with the sales.

At the fundraiser, Matt feels out of place with Sarah's colleagues, and also feels bummed that they are not passionate about films, preferring to watch things on streaming. He gets into an argument with Sarah and her colleagues when they feel his job is not as demanding as their professions, while questioning if his MK Ultra action series deserves to be called "art". During a charity bid for an expensive golfing vacation at Royal County Down Golf Club with Scottie Scheffler, Sarah's colleagues bid over $100,000, appearing to win, but are shocked when Matt suddenly bids $200,000 and wins the vacations. Sarah is very upset with Matt, and forces him to apologize and hand over the prize.

While Matt apologizes, he will only agree to give them the vacations if they admit his job is as important as their profession. This leads to another argument, where Matt insults them as the establishment is more known for filming locations than their own fundraisers. Matt finally admits to Sarah that their relationship cannot work as they have no respect for each other, and leaves to answer a call regarding the final edits to the trailer for Duhpocalypse!. Matt trips over a balloon, and finds that he broke his pinky. He goes back to Sarah's table, but she asks him to leave. As he walks away, he collapses on a table and is taken by an ambulance, ending on bad terms with Sarah. Later, Matt hooks up with Knoxville's agent Leigh, who is more knowledgeable about films but less enthusiastic about him.

== Production ==
=== Development ===
The episode was written by series co-creator Alex Gregory, and directed by series co-creators Seth Rogen and Evan Goldberg. It marked Gregory's second writing credit, Rogen's sixth directing credit, and Goldberg's sixth directing credit.

=== Writing ===
Rogen explained that the inspiration behind the episode originated when he and Goldberg wrote Superbad, remarking that they learned that "the more you see someone get sh-t on, the more terrible behavior they can get away with." He added, "the fact that nobody likes me and no one hangs around me, I think, allows my character to push the comedy further, and my character's likability was a real active topic of discussion as we were shooting the show." While some aspects were changed to make the doctors "meaner" than originally written, Rogen said that the episode was "based on my own feelings, being at tables with doctors and not feeling respected — nor should I — but that is based on my own ego. And placating people, kissing people's asses because you want a thing, wanting to be thanked, but a part of it is also from a very human, relatable place."

=== Filming ===
The episode was filmed in June 2024. Rogen remarked that they would continue filming oners even if they did not end up as planned, "It's good to just finish the first few [takes], for morale."

== Critical reviews ==
"The Pediatric Oncologist" received positive reviews from critics. Brian Tallerico of The A.V. Club gave the premiere a "B" grade and wrote, "While the extremes of this week's broader-than-average parody feel a bit over-stretched for comedic effect, the core of what Rogen and Evan Goldberg are doing here feels true to the Hollywood machine. After all, as Matt keeps trying to argue: The medical industry might make life possible, but art makes life worth living."

Keith Phipps of Vulture gave the episode a 4 star rating out of 5 and wrote, "The episode ends as it began, with Matt serving up a cappuccino to an overnight guest. Except it's not Sarah; it's Leigh. They slept with each other, but they still don't seem to like each other very much. But at least she's seen all the MK Ultra movies." Ben Sherlock of Screen Rant wrote, "The Studio has a great ensemble cast, but it rarely utilizes their on-screen chemistry. Still, Rogen does a terrific job in the spotlight this week."

=== Accolades ===
TVLine named Seth Rogen as an honorable mention for the "Performer of the Week" for the week of April 26, 2025, for his performance in the episode. The site wrote, "Seth Rogen is consistently great in The Studio, but in Episode 6, the comedian had us in stitches as he went full Larry David battling doctors at a cancer benefit. His character Matt tried to remain charming with witty banter and that hearty signature laugh, despite being patronized by his girlfriend's stuffy colleagues. But once they ridiculed his poop joke-heavy satire, the gloves were officially off. Rogen allowed the character's temper to rise during key cringeworthy moments, as the back-and-forth turned hilariously vicious with cutting insults and loads of disrespect on both sides. The actor then delivered a pratfall John Ritter would've been proud of, taking out an entire table with him and disrupting the whole event. The Curb-like circus may have cost Matt a girlfriend, but at least he fought the good fight to defend the arts... diarrhea explosions and all."
