= The Oner =

- The Studio episode
- Episode no.: Season 1 Episode 2
- Directed by: Seth Rogen; Evan Goldberg
- Written by: Peter Huyck
- Cinematography by: Adam Newport-Berra
- Editing by: Eric Kissack
- Original air date: March 26, 2025
- Running time: 25 minutes

Guest appearances
- Thomas Barbusca as PA Doug; Greta Lee as Herself; Sarah Polley as Herself

Episode chronology
← Previous "The Promotion"	Next → "The Note"

"The Oner" is the second episode of the American satirical comedy television series The Studio. The episode was written by series co-creator Peter Huyck, and directed by co-creators Seth Rogen and Evan Goldberg. It was released on Apple TV+ on March 26, 2025.

The series follows Matt Remick (Rogen), the newly appointed head of the film production company Continental Studios. He attempts to save the floundering company in an industry undergoing rapid social and economic changes. In the episode, Matt and Sal (Ike Barinholtz) arrive at a film set, where Sarah Polley is trying to get a "oner" shot. The episode itself is also a oner.

The episode received critical acclaim, with critics praising the episode's format, humor, and performances. At the 77th Primetime Emmy Awards, the episode won Outstanding Directing for a Comedy Series and Outstanding Cinematography for a Series (Half-Hour).

== Plot ==
Matt and Sal arrive at a house where Sarah Polley is directing a romantic drama starring Greta Lee. While Matt wants the film to use a oner for a scene set at sunset, Polley still wants extra money to license "You Can't Always Get What You Want" into the film.

Polley is annoyed by Matt's suggestions and presence on set, and Patty is also trying to get him to stop intervening. During their attempts to film the one take, a cigarette that Lee has to smoke flames out, forcing them to quickly reassemble. Later, Matt complains that the camera's live feed is malfunctioning, despite being told that it is still working. He speaks too loudly, distracting Lee and ruining another take. After Patty threatens to leak a video of him dropping a racist comment, Sal is forced to talk with Matt into leaving, informing him that Polley and Patty do not want him on set. Matt runs into Lee, who praises him for his suggestions but also asks for a private jet for the film's press tour.

As another take begins, Matt uses the opportunity to use the restroom, but upon leaving and talking to Lee about the press tour, he realizes that they were filming and he ruined the take again. As he tries leaving, he accidentally slips and injures himself, forcing Polley to get him back with her as they need the take as soon as possible. Lee refilms the scene almost perfectly, but is unable to complete it as the scene requires her to drive away and Matt's car is blocking the entry. Polley angrily chases Matt away from set, but he wastes more time as he forgot the keys to his car after a prior outfit change. As Matt and Sal drive away from the house, Sal is informed through text that the crew were ultimately unable to get the shot as night has fallen.

== Production ==
=== Development ===
The episode was written by series co-creator Peter Huyck, and directed by co-creators Seth Rogen and Evan Goldberg.

=== Casting ===
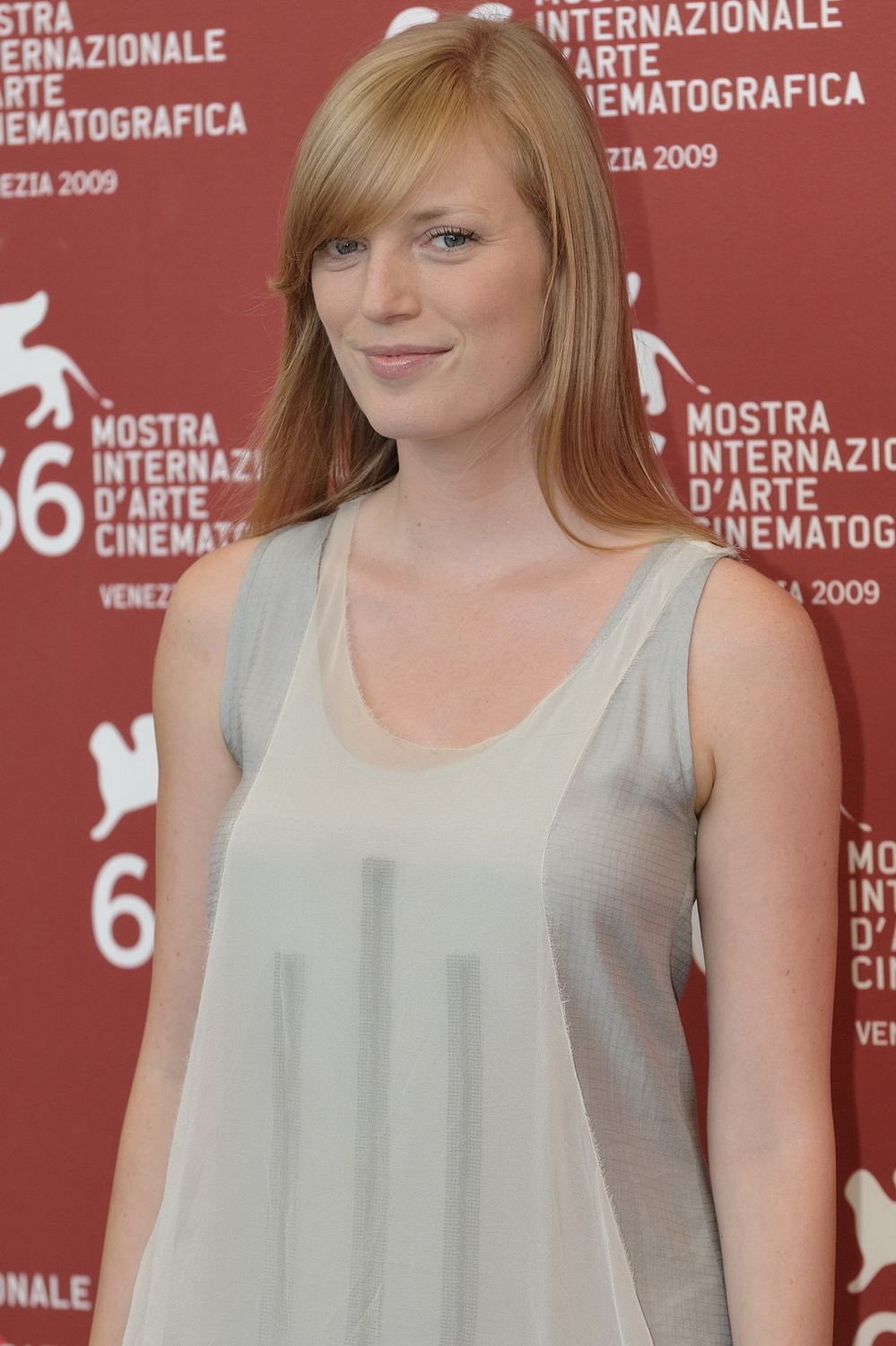
Sarah Polley guest stars in the episode as herself.

Sarah Polley had quit acting for 17 years, choosing to focus on her career as director. She approached Rogen for advice while promoting the awards tour for Women Talking, where he suggested a guest appearance in the series. Polley said that her decision to return to acting was based on "If I ever do it again, it has to be after a long break, and I have to forget everything I know and do something totally different." She was very interested in playing a version of herself that grows impatient. "I definitely lose it in a way that I never have on set, but it felt extraordinarily therapeutic to get to do that as an actor. I wasn't exactly playing myself. I was playing a character of myself that I thought would be more entertaining. Never say never, but I've made it through four films [as a director] without a meltdown on set."

=== Filming ===
Rogen explained the purpose of using a oner for the episode, "We were like, [the use of the oner] is actually gonna capture the panic and the mania, the compressed nature of the timelines and the stories, which a lot of the episodes have." Cinematographer Adam Newport-Berra said that to prepare for the episode's format, the crew recorded the lines on location while timing them. He said, "Often we'd have to figure out how to blend two locations, or how we would get out of one scene and into another." The crew used a Ronin gimbal to help with the car driving sequences.

The script, which was 40 pages long, was split into filming for four days. As such, four 10-page chunks were rehearsed on separate days from 10am to 5pm, before finally filming from 5pm to 6:30pm. Rogen added, "I thought it was going to be too dark. The take we used, I think, was the very last time we did it. And it actually ended up working perfectly."

== Critical reviews ==
"The Oner" received critical acclaim. Brian Tallerico of The A.V. Club gave the premiere an "A–" grade and wrote, "It’s a fantastic episode of television, a quick burst of comedy that works in the fabric of this program or as a standalone short film. And it's an installment that highlights the rhythms of Rogen and Goldberg's dialogue, with lines that push the plot forward while also getting regular laughs."

Keith Phipps of Vulture gave the episode a perfect 5 star rating out of 5 and wrote, "A brilliant and exhausting half-hour of television, “The Oner” digs into Matt's character to discover new depths of insecurity. That this insecurity is tied to a commitment to making good movies makes him sympathetic, but it can't undo the damage he does. He's not an egomaniac, but he's not ego-less, either. He thrills at the idea of his suggestion ending up in a movie and loves the attention and flattery Lee lavishes on him. But mostly he's incapable of getting out of his own way and, consequently, gets in the way of others."

Ben Sherlock of Screen Rant wrote, "The second episode builds on the characters, their world, and relationships established in the first episode, elevating the satire even more and making for a series that deeply understands what it's trying to do and excelling at it." Nicole Gallucci of Decider wrote, "Sure, it's only March. But we're already confident that “The Oner” will go down as one of the greatest, funniest, most stressful television episodes of 2025."

== Awards and nominations ==
Award	Year	Category	Recipient(s)	Result	Ref.
American Society of Cinematographers	2026	Episode of a Half-Hour Series	Adam Newport-Berra	Won	
Astra TV Awards	2025	Best Directing in a Comedy Series	Seth Rogen and Evan Goldberg	Won	
British Society of Cinematographers	2026	Best Cinematography in a Television Drama (International/Streaming)	Adam Newport-Berra	Nominated	
Creative Arts Emmy Awards	2025	Outstanding Cinematography for a Series (Half-Hour)	Adam Newport-Berra	Won	
Directors Guild of America Awards	2026	Outstanding Directorial Achievement in Comedy Series	Seth Rogen and Evan Goldberg	Won	
Primetime Emmy Awards	2025	Outstanding Directing for a Comedy Series	Seth Rogen and Evan Goldberg	Won	
Society of Camera Operators	2026	Camera Operator of the Year – Television	Mark Goellnicht	Won	
