= Ziwe Fumudoh =

American comedian and writer

Ziwe
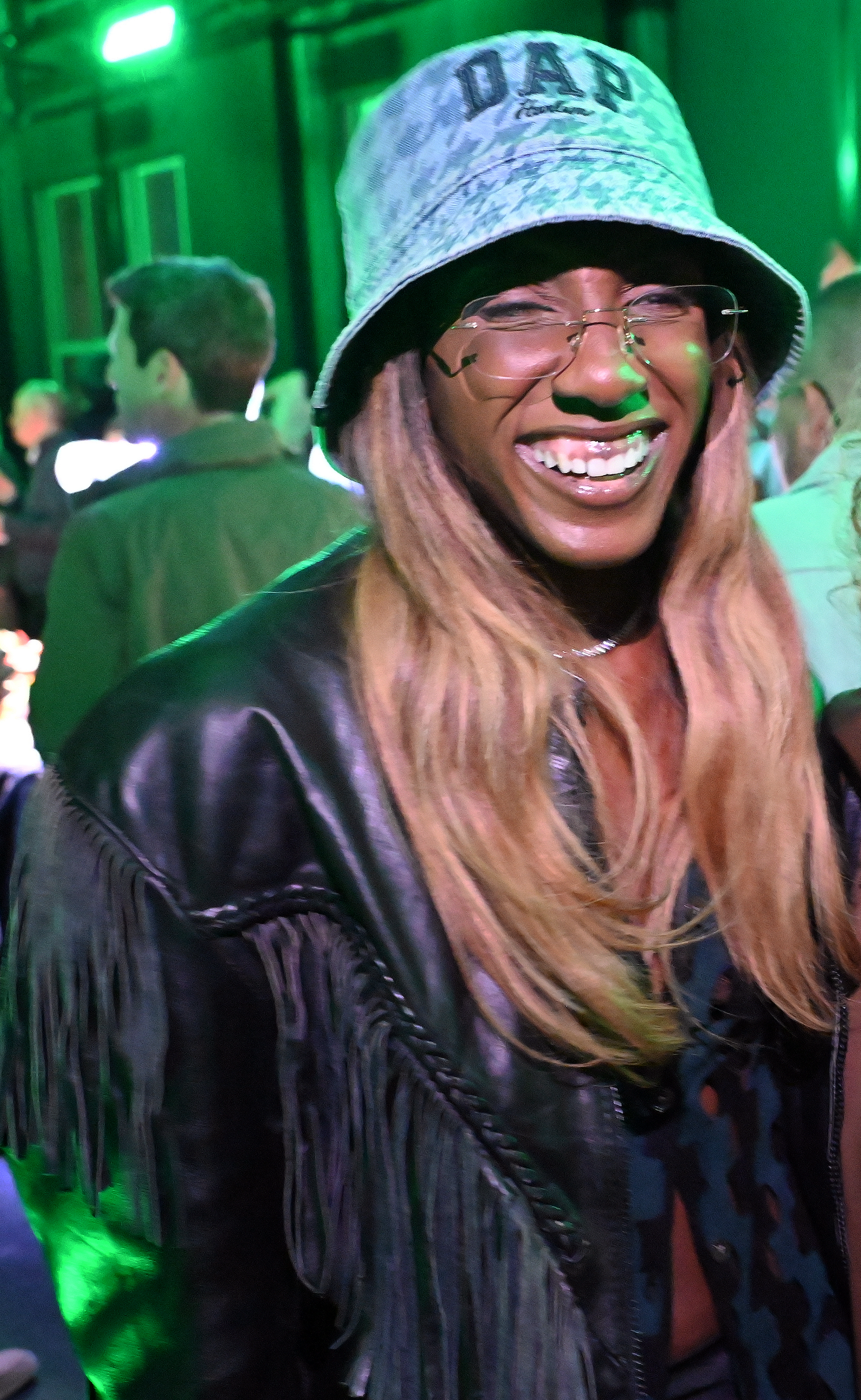
- Born: Ziwerekoru Fumudoh; February 27, 1992 (age 34); Lawrence, Massachusetts
- Education: Northwestern University (BA)

Comedy career
- Years active: 2013–present
- Genres: Political/news satire; character comedy; sketch comedy
- Subjects: American politics; American culture; pop culture; current events; race relations; embarrassment

Ziwerekoru "Ziwe" Fumudoh (born February 27, 1992) is a Nigerian-American comedian, writer, and actress. She is known for her satirical commentary on politics, race relations, and young adulthood.

In 2017, she created the YouTube comedy show Baited with Ziwe and its 2020 Instagram Live iteration. She wrote for Desus & Mero from 2018 to 2020, and she co-hosted Crooked Media's Hysteria podcast in 2018. Fumudoh starred in and executive produced the Showtime variety series Ziwe (2021–2022). She published a collection of essays called Black Friend in October 2023.

== Early life and education ==
Born February 27, 1992, Fumudoh grew up in Lawrence, Massachusetts, the second of three children to Nigerian immigrant parents.

Fumudoh graduated from Phillips Academy in Andover, Massachusetts in 2010 and attended Northwestern University.

While an undergraduate at Northwestern University, Fumudoh wrote for student publications including Purp Magazine, Northwestern Sketch Television, and Project SOARD. In 2014, Fumudoh graduated with a double major in radio, television, & film and African American studies; and a minor in creative writing with a concentration in poetry.

== Career ==
=== 2013–2017: Early years ===
In 2013, Fumudoh worked as a summer intern at Comedy Central on shows including The Daily Show and The Colbert Report. During her senior year of college, she interned as a writer for The Onion and took improv classes at iO Theater. At The Onion she worked in video, research, and contributing features. From 2015 to 2020, she wrote for publications including The Riveter Magazine; Reductress; The Daily Dot; Into The Gloss, where she wrote a column called "Operation Goo Goo Gah Gah;" Vulture, where she wrote television recaps; and The New Yorker.

After graduation, she worked at Lorne Michaels's Above Average Productions. Her first television job was as a screenwriter on The Rundown with Robin Thede.

=== 2017–2020: Baited with Ziwe and Desus & Mero ===
In 2017, Fumudoh created Baited with Ziwe, a show on YouTube that featured her "baiting" her white friends into making unwitting racial faux pas. In an interview, Fumudoh later said, "I love that Baited allows viewers to laugh about race while still acknowledging its complexity. Of all projects I worked on, it's definitely one of my favorites." In the same interview, she said that she got the inspiration for the show from asking her white coworkers what questions they would be uncomfortable to answer on camera.

In 2018, Fumudoh appeared frequently in Pop Show, a live show she created at Brooklyn's Union Hall in which she performed original pop songs. That same year, she co-hosted Hysteria, a podcast from Crooked Media.

From 2018 to 2020, Fumudoh was a writer on the TV show Desus and Mero. A Forbes reviewer wrote that she had the "confidence of an old comedy pro." During that time, Fumudoh joined the cast of Our Cartoon President as the voice of Kamala Harris. She also wrote the season 3 episode "Senate Control."

During the COVID-19 pandemic in 2020, Fumudoh moved the show from YouTube to Instagram Live with weekly celebrity guests including Caroline Calloway, Alison Roman, Alyssa Milano, and Rose McGowan. She stated that her show's goals were to facilitate discussions about race while entertaining people and critiquing the system. Guests were asked to participate in games that illuminated societal discomforts surrounding race, one of which was titled “Enslave, Appropriate, Silence,” a take on “Fuck, Marry, Kill”.

=== 2020–2021: Ziwe on Showtime ===
In August 2020, Fumudoh's collection of comedic essays was announced. Initially set to be titled The Book of Ziwe, the book was published by Abrams on October 24, 2023 under the title Black Friend: Essays. To promote the book, Fumudoh undertook an eight-stop US book tour.

In October 2020, the first season of Ziwe, Fumudoh's variety show on Showtime, was announced. The season launched in May and ran through June 13. It featured sketches, musical numbers, and interviews with celebrity guests including Fran Lebowitz, Bowen Yang, Phoebe Bridgers, Julio Torres, and Stacey Abrams. Fumudoh served as host, writer, and producer, and she worked with costume designer Pamela Shepard-Hill.

In June of 2021, Showtime announced that Ziwe would be renewed for a second season.

In 2021, Fumudoh wrote for the television series Dickinson and appeared in two episodes as Sojourner Truth. That same year, she played Sophie Iwobi, a comedic commentator on a late-night show resembling Ziwe, in one episode of the third season of Succession. The character was tailored to more closely resemble Fumudoh after she was cast.

Season 2 debuted on November 18, 2022. Celebrity guests included Ilana Glazer, Mia Khalifa, Emily Ratajkowski, Katya Zamolodchikova, Julia Fox, Bob the Drag Queen, Joel Kim Booster, Amber Riley, Michael Che, and Hannibal Burress.

In April 2023, Showtime announced it would not renew the series following a change of network leadership. Critics lamented the loss of the only late night style comedy show hosted by a Black woman, particularly in the wake of TBS' cancellation of Full Frontal with Samantha Bee in July of 2022.

=== 2023–present: Return to YouTube ===
In 2023, Fumudoh transitioned the interview series from Showtime to YouTube. As of November 2026, Fumudoh has around 707,000 subscribers.

In September 2023, Fumudoh was part of the "My Wings, My Way" campaign for Victoria's Secret.

On December 18, 2023, Fumudoh interviewed former U.S. House representative George Santos on her YouTube show titled Ziwe News Network (ZNN). The interview was covered in political news outlets and entertainment columns.

On November 6, 2025, Fumudoh interviewed New York City Mayor Eric Adams. The interview received news coverage for Adams' behavior.

Other guests have included comedian Caleb Hearon, singer Reneé Rapp, drag queen Jinkx Monsoon, SNL cast member Devon Walker, comedian Kevin Hart, rapper Vince Staples, Real Housewives of Atlanta star Porsha Williams, media personality Whitney Leavitt, Twitch streamer Hasan Piker, and actor Adam Pally.

== Influences ==
Fumudoh has cited Jonathan Swift and Stephen Colbert as influences, having been introduced to them by a teacher during her freshman year of high school. She has also taken inspiration from Oprah, the works of Zach Galifianakis, and Nathan Fielder, as well as from shows like Arrested Development, The Office, and 30 Rock.

== Personal life ==
Fumudoh lives in Brooklyn's Bushwick neighborhood.

Fumudoh grew up with strict Christian parents and she does not adhere to the same spiritual beliefs as her parents.

== Filmography ==
Ziwe Fumudoh film and television credits
Year	Title	Role	Notes
2017–2018	The Rundown with Robin Thede	None	Writer (7 episodes)
2018–2020	Desus & Mero	None	Writer (66 episodes)
2019–2020	Our Cartoon President	Kamala Harris, various characters (voice)	11 episodes; also writer
2020–2021	Stephen Colbert Presents Tooning Out The News	Various voices	12 episodes
2021–2022	Ziwe	Herself (host)	Also producer, creator, and writer
2021	Succession	Sophie Iwobi	Episode: "The Disruption"
2021	Dickinson	Sojourner Truth	2 episodes, also writer
2021–2023	The Great North	Amelia (voice)	9 episodes
2022	That Damn Michael Che	Herself	Episode: "Black Mediocrity"
2022	Central Park	(voice)	Episode: "The Puffs Go Poof"
2023	Teenage Euthanasia	Various voices	2 episodes
2024	Shell	Audrey	
2025	The Studio	Herself	Episode: "Casting"
2026	One Night Only		

== Discography ==
All credits are adapted from Apple Music and Spotify.

=== As lead artist ===
==== Singles ====
Year	Title	Album	Writer(s)	Producer(s)
2022	"Surveil Me" (featuring Jen Goma)	Non-album singles	Ziwerekoru Fumudoh, Jen Goma	Jen Goma
2022	"Men" (featuring Jen Goma)	Non-album singles	Ziwerekoru Fumudoh, Jen Goma	Jen Goma
2022	"Am I Gay?" (featuring Jen Goma)	Non-album singles	Ziwerekoru Fumudoh, Jen Goma	Ziwerekoru Fumudoh, Jen Goma
2022	"Hot Hot Ozone" (featuring Jen Goma)	Non-album singles	Ziwerekoru Fumudoh, Jen Goma	Ziwerekoru Fumudoh, Jen Goma
2022	"Black in E Minor" (featuring Jen Goma)	Non-album singles	Ziwerekoru Fumudoh, Jen Goma	Ziwerekoru Fumudoh, Jen Goma
2022	"Famous and Normal" (featuring Jo Firestone)	Non-album singles	Ziwerekoru Fumudoh, Sam Taggart, Jen Goma	Jen Goma
2022	"Baby Let's Move On"	Non-album singles	Ziwerekoru Fumudoh, Sam Taggart, Jen Goma	Jen Goma
2021	"White Actor Blues" (featuring Sam Taggart & Helene Yorke)	Ziwe: A Famously Iconic Soundtrack	Ziwerekoru Fumudoh, Michelle Davis, Jen Goma	Jen Goma
2021	"What Do I Get Out of It"	Ziwe: A Famously Iconic Soundtrack	Ziwerekoru Fumudoh, Cole Andrew Escola, Chicken	Chicken
2021	"Black Friends" (featuring Patti Harrison)	Ziwe: A Famously Iconic Soundtrack	Ziwerekoru Fumudoh, Jordan Mendoza, William D Freeman, William M. Kawesch	Donwill
2021	"Stop Being Poor" (featuring Patti Harrison)	Ziwe: A Famously Iconic Soundtrack	Ziwerekoru Fumudoh, Jordan Mendoza, Chicken	Chicken
2021	"Wet Diaper (Goo Goo Gah Gah)"	Ziwe: A Famously Iconic Soundtrack	Ziwerekoru Fumudoh, Jordan Mendoza, Jen Goma	Jen Goma
2021	"Lisa Called the Cops"	Ziwe: A Famously Iconic Soundtrack	Ziwerekoru Fumudoh, Cole Andrew Escola, Misha Bess Lambert	Misha Lambert
2021	"Ponderosa With Omarosa"	Generation Ziwe	Ziwerekoru Fumudoh	No producer credited
2021	"Make It Clap for Democracy"	Generation Ziwe	Ziwerekoru Fumudoh	No producer credited

==== Extended plays ====
Title	Details
Ziwe: A Famously Iconic Soundtrack	Released: June 18, 2021; Label: Self-released; Format: Digital download, streaming
Generation Ziwe	Released: April 28, 2021; Label: Self-released; Format: Digital download, streaming
