= The Gunfighter (2014 film) =

2014 film

- Promotional poster
- Directed by: Eric Kissack
- Written by: Kevin Tenglin
- Produced by: Christopher Northup; Sarah Platt
- Starring: Shawn Parsons; Scott Beehner; Brace Harris; Eileen O'Connell
- Narrated by: Nick Offerman
- Cinematography: Jon Aguirresarobe
- Edited by: Libby Cuenin
- Music by: Paul Thomson
- Production company: Six Shooter Films
- Release date: March 21, 2014 (CIFF)
- Running time: 9 minutes
- Country: United States
- Language: English
- Budget: $25,000

The Gunfighter is a 2014 short film directed by Eric Kissack. A twist on the Western genre, the film concerns a group of people in a saloon who, in an act of breaking the fourth wall, are able to hear the narrator of the film.

== Plot ==
A gunfighter enters a saloon, and his actions are narrated by an unseen voice, much to the confusion of those in the saloon. The narrator begins revealing the thoughts of the characters, as a typical film narrator would, yet the thoughts are mostly personal or humiliating to the characters. The characters test the narrator's truthfulness by instructing a woman, Sally, to think of a number, which the narrator correctly states. Once the narrator makes it known that almost every patron of the bar has practiced infidelity (including one case of bestiality) and that the gunfighter himself is gay, almost every character draws a gun, initiating a Mexican standoff. The gunfighter realises the narrator's sadism, as he is trying to make the patrons kill one another.

He gives a speech about disregarding the narrator's divisive language and coming together to form a utopia. The narrator then discloses that the gunslinger had killed the son of one of the patrons, after which everyone shoots at each other. By the end of the shootout, each patron in the saloon is killed, except for Sally, whom the narrator explains will die from mauling by a rabid wolf the following day.

== Cast ==
- Shawn Parsons as the Gunfighter
- Nick Offerman as the Narrator
- Scott Beehner as Tommy Henderson
- Brace Harris as Johnny Henderson
- Eileen O'Connell as Sally
- Jordan Black as Sam
- Timothy Brennen as Bill Jessup
- Travis Lincoln Cox as Elijah Jessup
- Schoen Hodges as Gabriel Jessup

== Production ==
The film was shot at the Melody Ranch Motion Picture Studio in Santa Clarita, California, and was partly inspired by the television series Deadwood. It was filmed over the course of a weekend, on a budget of under $25,000, much of which went towards costume design and props. The film's director, Eric Kissack, contacted comedic writer and filmmaker David Wain in order to help cast actor Nick Offerman as the unseen narrator. The film was presented to Offerman with a different narrating voice to act as a placeholder until a superior narrator was acquired. Offerman enjoyed the film and his narration, which is present in the finished film, was subsequently recorded.

== Reception and awards ==
The Gunfighter has received mostly positive reviews. The film won the Audience Award for Best Short Film at the 2014 Los Angeles Film Festival and was a "Best of Fest Selection" at the 2014 Palm Springs International Festival of Short Films. Film reviewer John Arkelian wrote that, in regards to the narration, "it’s an omniscient author getting in the way of his own characters. The result is quite amusing, if sometimes vulgar."

== See also ==
- Fourth wall
- Meta-reference
- Unreliable narrator
