= Matthew Belloni =

American journalist and podcaster

- Born: 1974 or 1975 (age 50–51)
- Education: University of California, Berkeley (BA); University of Southern California (JD)
- Occupations: Journalist; podcaster
- Employers: The Hollywood Reporter (2006–2020); Puck (2021–present)
- Spouse: Kimberlin Dalehite (m. 2011)

Matthew Belloni (born 1975) is an American entertainment journalist, podcaster, and former attorney. He is a founding partner of the digital media company Puck. Before that, he was the editorial director of The Hollywood Reporter.

== Education ==
Belloni received a bachelor's degree in political science from the University of California, Berkeley, and earned a juris doctor from the USC Gould School of Law, where he was a member of the USC Law Review.

== Career ==
Early in his career, Belloni was an attorney at an entertainment law firm in Los Angeles. He also wrote for magazines such as Esquire and Town & Country.

He joined The Hollywood Reporter in 2006, and was editorial director for the magazine from 2016 to 2020, where he was responsible for all editorial content. In April 2020, he left The Hollywood Reporter after a series of editorial disputes with the publication's management.

Belloni joined Puck in May 2021 as a founding partner and writes a twice-weekly newsletter called What I'm Hearing about the entertainment industry. As an industry expert, Belloni appears regularly on shows such as NBC Nightly News, CBS This Morning, CNN, CNBC, and NPR's The Business.

In March 2022, Belloni launched the Hollywood insider podcast The Town on The Ringer Podcast Network.

He appears as himself in episodes 1, 9 and 10 of the first season of The Studio, an Apple TV+ comedy created by Seth Rogen and Evan Goldberg.

== Awards ==
In 2020, Belloni and The Hollywood Reporter won the National Magazine Award for General Excellence, special interest publication, from the American Society of Magazine Editors.

== Personal life ==
Belloni married talent manager Kimberlin Dalehite on October 1, 2011, in Pacific Palisades, Los Angeles.
