= Peter Huyck =

American screenwriter

- Born: 1975 (age 50–51)
- Education: Stanford University
- Occupations: Television writer, producer, director
- Years active: 1990s–present
- Notable work: Veep; White House Plumbers; The Studio; A Good Old Fashioned Orgy
- Spouse: Jessica Clements
- Awards: Primetime Emmy Awards

Peter Huyck (born 1975) is an American television writer, producer, and director. He is best known for co-creating the HBO miniseries White House Plumbers (2023) with Alex Gregory and for senior writing and producing roles on Veep. He also co-created the Apple TV+ comedy series The Studio (2025) and co-wrote and co-directed the feature film A Good Old Fashioned Orgy (2011).

== Early life ==
Huyck was born in 1975 and is of Dutch ancestry. He attended Stanford University, graduating in 1993. He is noted in university publications as one of several alumni who pursued careers in television writing and screenwriting. During his time at Stanford, he served as the Stanford Tree mascot for the university's band in 1991-1992.

== Career ==
Huyck began his television career writing for late-night and comedy series, including Late Show with David Letterman and The Larry Sanders Show. His work on The Larry Sanders Show earned a nomination for Outstanding Writing for a Comedy Series at the Primetime Emmy Awards in 1998. He later received Emmy recognition for producing work on King of the Hill and Veep, winning the award for Outstanding Comedy Series for Veep in 2017 and 2019. Huyck co-wrote and co-directed the feature comedy A Good Old Fashioned Orgy (2011) with Alex Gregory, and later co-wrote What Men Want (2019). With Gregory, he co-created White House Plumbers, a five-episode dramatization of the Watergate break-ins directed by David Mandel and starring Woody Harrelson and Justin Theroux. He subsequently co-created The Studio (2025) for Apple TV+ with Seth Rogen, Evan Goldberg, Alex Gregory, and Frida Perez, serving as executive producer and writer.

== Personal life ==
Huyck has been married to American model and YouTuber Jessica Clements since 2024. He is also a cousin of screenwriter and director Willard Huyck, known for American Graffiti and Howard the Duck.

== Awards and nominations ==
Huyck has been nominated for multiple Primetime Emmy Awards and has won two as a producer on Veep.

== Selected filmography ==
=== Television ===
- Late Show with David Letterman — writer (1990s)
- The Larry Sanders Show — writer/producer (final season)
- King of the Hill — writer/producer (2000s)
- Veep — writer/producer (seasons 5–7)
- White House Plumbers — co-creator, writer, executive producer (2023)
- The Studio — co-creator, writer, executive producer (2025)

=== Film ===
- A Good Old Fashioned Orgy (2011) — co-writer, co-director
- What Men Want (2019) — co-screenwriter
