= The Studio (TV series) =

2025 American comedy television series

- Genre: Cringe comedy; Satire
- Created by: Seth Rogen; Evan Goldberg; Peter Huyck; Alex Gregory; Frida Perez
- Showrunners: Seth Rogen; Evan Goldberg; Peter Huyck; Alex Gregory; Frida Perez
- Directed by: Seth Rogen; Evan Goldberg
- Starring: Seth Rogen; Catherine O'Hara; Ike Barinholtz; Chase Sui Wonders; Kathryn Hahn
- Composer: Antonio Sánchez
- Country of origin: United States
- Original language: English
- No. of seasons: 1
- No. of episodes: 10

Production
- Executive producers: Seth Rogen; Evan Goldberg; James Weaver; Frida Perez; Peter Huyck; Alex Gregory; Alex McAtee; Josh Fagen
- Producer: Jesse Sternbaum
- Cinematography: Adam Newport-Berra
- Editor: Eric Kissack
- Camera setup: Single-camera
- Running time: 24–44 minutes
- Production companies: Coytesville Productions; Contractually Obligated Two Second Half Screen Vanity Card Productions; Point Grey Pictures; Lionsgate Television

Original release
- Network: Apple TV+
- Release: March 26, 2025 – present
- Network: Apple TV

The Studio is an American satirical cringe comedy television series created by Seth Rogen, Evan Goldberg, Peter Huyck, Alex Gregory, and Frida Perez. It stars Rogen as an embattled Hollywood studio head struggling to balance corporate demands with his own film production desires. Catherine O'Hara (in her final appearance before her death), Ike Barinholtz, Chase Sui Wonders, and Kathryn Hahn play supporting roles. The series was released on Apple TV with the first two episodes on March 26, 2025, with Rogen and Goldberg directing all episodes. The series has been renewed for a second season.

The Studio received acclaim for its direction, performances, cinematography, humor, and satire of the film industry. Viewers and critics have highlighted its extensive use of long takes, as well as for featuring high-profile celebrity cameos in every episode. In its first season, the show earned 23 nominations at the 77th Primetime Emmy Awards, making it the most-nominated comedy debut in history and tying the record for the most nominations for a single comedy season. It went on to win 13 Emmys from those nominations (including Outstanding Comedy Series and Outstanding Lead Actor in a Comedy Series for Rogen), breaking the record for most wins for a comedy series in a single season before it was overtaken by the first season of Widow's Bay the next year. The season also received the Television Critics Association Award for Outstanding Achievement in Comedy and Best Television Series – Musical or Comedy at the 83rd Golden Globe Awards.

== Premise ==
Matt Remick is the newly appointed head of the struggling film production company Continental Studios. A self-described cinephile, Matt struggles to balance Continental's corporate aims in an increasingly intellectual property-driven entertainment landscape with his own ambition to produce films.

== Cast ==
=== Main ===
- Seth Rogen as Matt Remick, the new head of Continental Studios who tries to balance his desires for film creations with the profits of the studio
- Catherine O'Hara as Patty Leigh (season 1), the former studio head and Matt's mentor
- Ike Barinholtz as Sal Saperstein, Continental's vice president of production and Matt's close friend
- Chase Sui Wonders as Quinn Hackett, Matt's former assistant who he promotes to junior executive
- Kathryn Hahn as Maya Mason, Continental's head of marketing

=== Recurring ===
- Bryan Cranston as Griffin Mill, Continental's CEO
- David Krumholtz as Mitch Weitz, a Hollywood talent agent who primarily represents directors
- Keyla Monterroso Mejia as Petra, Matt's new assistant
- Dewayne Perkins as Tyler, Continental's head of publicity
- Nicholas Stoller as himself, who has been hired to direct a Kool-Aid movie for Continental
- Dave Franco as himself, supporting actor in the movie Alphabet City for Continental
- Zoë Kravitz as herself, the star of Continental's films Open and the tentatively in-development Blackwing
- Matt Belloni as himself, entertainment journalist and host of the podcast The Town

=== Guest ===
- Thomas Barbusca as PA Doug
- Devon Bostick as Miles, Quinn's boyfriend
- Jessica St. Clair as Leigh, a Hollywood talent agent who has an on-again, off-again sexual relationship with Matt.
- Rebecca Hall as Sarah, a pediatric oncologist and Matt's girlfriend
- Sugar Lyn Beard as Rebecca Chan-Sanders, Sarah's colleague and friend
- Rhea Perlman as Matt's mom
- Alan Barinholtz as Projectionist
- Lisa Gilroy as Gabby, Zoë Kravitz's publicist

==== As themselves ====
===== Season 1 =====
- Paul Dano
- Peter Berg
- Martin Scorsese
- Charlize Theron
- Steve Buscemi
- Sarah Polley
- Greta Lee
- Anthony Mackie
- Ron Howard
- Olivia Wilde
- Zac Efron
- Parker Finn
- Owen Kline
- Johnny Knoxville
- Josh Hutcherson
- Ice Cube
- Lil Rel Howery
- Ziwe Fumudoh
- Charli D'Amelio
- Adam Scott
- Jen Statsky
- Lucia Aniello
- Paul W. Downs
- Ted Sarandos
- Ramy Youssef
- Erin Moriarty
- Antony Starr
- Quinta Brunson
- Jean Smart
- Aaron Sorkin
- Zack Snyder

===== Season 2 =====
- Madonna
- Michael Keaton
- Julia Garner
- Donald Glover
- Channing Tatum
- Mario Lopez
- Jonah Hill

== Episodes ==
No.	Title	Directed by	Written by	Original release date
1	"The Promotion"	Seth Rogen & Evan Goldberg	Seth Rogen & Evan Goldberg & Peter Huyck & Alex Gregory & Frida Perez	March 26, 2025
Matt Remick is a studio executive at Continental Studios who still believes in artistic integrity in an increasingly IP-based industry. He gets a long-awaited promotion to studio head after his mentor, Patty Leigh, is fired at the behest of new CEO Griffin Mill. Griffin offers him the job as long as he greenlights a movie based on the Kool-Aid Man, so Matt reluctantly agrees. Figuring that the best route is to hire a good director, he handpicks Nicholas Stoller. Matt then learns Martin Scorsese and Steve Buscemi have written a script about the Jonestown massacre and decides to use that as the Kool-Aid film instead. However, Matt's idea gets pushback from fellow exec Sal Saperstein and head of marketing Maya Mason, so he chooses to go with Stoller's idea after a meeting with Griffin, claiming he bought Scorsese's script to kill his project. To rehire Stoller, Matt visits Patty, who agrees after bargaining a lucrative deal to produce her own movies. At a party hosted by Charlize Theron, Matt and Sal break the news to Scorsese that his project, intended to be his final film, will never be made; a scorned Scorsese rebukes Matt and breaks down into tears, and Theron kicks Matt and Sal out.
2	"The Oner"	Seth Rogen & Evan Goldberg	Peter Huyck	March 26, 2025
Matt and Sal head over to the set of The Silver Lake, a romantic drama film directed by Sarah Polley and starring Greta Lee, hoping to see them shoot a oner at sunset, which can only be shot that day due to time constraints. Both filmmakers want something from Matt: Polley needs money to play "You Can't Always Get What You Want" over the scene, and Lee wants to use one of the studio's private jets during the press tour. Patty and Sal try to get Matt off the set, fearing he will obstruct the cast and crew. Polley, wishing to please Matt, acquiesces to one of his propositions for the scene, which causes the crew to lose valuable time and the first take to be ruined. Matt further ruins other takes by speaking too loud while at the video village, accidentally appearing on camera, and getting injured. A seemingly perfect take gets ruined when Lee cannot exit the driveway of the set due to Matt's car being parked in front of hers; Polley promptly expels him from the set. Matt and Sal drive off as night falls and get a text that the crew was ultimately unable to get the shot.
3	"The Note"	Seth Rogen & Evan Goldberg	Seth Rogen & Evan Goldberg	April 2, 2025
The team's excitement of watching a preview screening of Ron Howard's new film Alphabet City turns sour due to a meandering final sequence at a motel, which all agree should be cut. Howard's early arrival at the studio for a marketing meeting provides an opportunity for Matt to deliver the note, but Matt is reluctant to do so due to a traumatic experience when he offered feedback for A Beautiful Mind that led to Howard mocking him. Patty's revelation that the motel sequence is a tribute to Howard's late cousin complicates matters, with Quinn, Sal, and later Anthony Mackie (the film's star and producer) failing to tell Howard. Maya informs the team that keeping the movie's length as it is will reduce the number of screenings and cut its revenue. At the meeting, Maya mentions that Matt has feedback, prompting Howard to bring up the A Beautiful Mind story. A humiliated Matt snaps at Howard about the boring nature of the motel sequence, to which Howard responds aggressively. Later that night, Matt receives a phone call from Howard, who apologizes and agrees to cut the sequence while also threatening to destroy Matt if he were to ever cross him again.
4	"The Missing Reel"	Seth Rogen & Evan Goldberg	Peter Huyck	April 9, 2025
Matt's support of film forces him to scrap the wrap party of Olivia Wilde's neo-noir detective movie after it goes overbudget. After a reel containing an expensive sequence is presumed stolen, Matt and Sal scurry to locate it to avoid reshooting. They suspect lead actor Zac Efron and find an envelope of cash in his trailer addressed to costume designer Evelyn, who retrieves it and exchanges it with a man with a wrist tattoo for a box. Evelyn heads to the Chateau Marmont, with Efron arriving soon after to an invitation-only event. Sal leaves, but Matt sees him returning. Matt sneaks in to find Efron throwing a secret wrap party, and discovers Evelyn's box just contains custom-made hats for the crew. Matt and Sal reconcile and notice extras with the fake wrist tattoo, which Wilde also had after shooting a cameo. After Efron reveals Wilde was unhappy with the scene on the missing reel, Matt and Sal deduce she stole it. They confront her near the Hollywood Sign where she is directing pick-up shots, and she confesses to stealing it to force reshoots. After a chase, Wilde destroys the reel by letting it roll downhill. Matt is forced to sell his car to Efron to pay for the reshoots.
5	"The War"	Seth Rogen & Evan Goldberg	Frida Perez	April 16, 2025
Sal is trying to get Smile director Parker Finn to direct a slasher film entitled Wink, while Quinn wants to bring in Owen Kline for her own similar project. Matt opts for Wink but agrees to meet with both directors. Feeling disrespected by Sal, Quinn erases Finn's scheduled meeting from Matt's assistant's computer, causing Matt to miss it for a different meeting with Chris Hemsworth. In retaliation, Sal crashes Kline's meeting and scares him off with the prospect of studio pressure. Quinn strikes back by stealing Sal's assistant Daniel's golf cart to block Sal's reserved parking spot, causing a series of mishaps that ruins Sal's suit and makes him miss a rescheduled meeting with Finn. Sal chases Quinn and throws her burrito at her, inadvertently hitting an assistant director driving a golf cart, who crashes and destroys Netflix's Waterloo miniseries set. When human resources investigates the incident, Quinn sees an opportunity to get Sal fired and take his job. Fearing it will destroy his life, Sal cries; Quinn relents, agreeing to play along with his cover story for the investigation if he gives her his parking spot and helps her movies get made. Having reconciled, they meet to discuss directors for Wink.
6	"The Pediatric Oncologist"	Seth Rogen & Evan Goldberg	Alex Gregory	April 23, 2025
Matt accompanies his new pediatric oncologist girlfriend, Sarah, to the Ebell for a Cedars-Sinai Medical Center fundraiser to benefit children with cancer. He becomes dismayed by Sarah and her colleagues' dismissive attitudes towards cinema and his job, particularly Duhpocalypse!, Continental's upcoming Spike Jonze-directed satire starring Johnny Knoxville and Josh Hutcherson and featuring scatological humor. In a power play during the charity auction, Matt outbids Sarah's friends, who were hoping to win a golfing vacation at Royal County Down Golf Club with Scottie Scheffler that Matt has no interest in, angering Sarah. Matt apologizes and offers to gift them the prize if they agree that movies are as important as medicine. They refuse, and an agitated Matt trips over while monitoring the in-progress Duhpocalypse! trailer edits on his phone, breaking his right pinkie and passing out before he is loaded into an ambulance without Sarah. While recuperating at home, Matt hooks up with Knoxville's agent Leigh, who is more knowledgeable about movies but less enthusiastic about him.
7	"Casting"	Seth Rogen & Evan Goldberg	Alex Gregory	April 30, 2025
Concerned that casting Ice Cube as the voice of the Kool-Aid Man may play into stereotypes of African Americans, the team solicits feedback. Quinn says it's not a problem since Kool-Aid is more of a poor people's drink; Tyler says not having a Black man as the Kool-Aid Man is racist; and Ziwe and Lil Rel Howery say it would be racist if Mrs. Kool were not also voiced by a Black woman, leading to Regina King replacing Sandra Oh in the cast. As this makes the live action cast all White, Don Cheadle and Keke Palmer replace Josh Duhamel and Jessica Biel. Screenwriters Dev and Sandra quit, feeling Black writers should rework the script for the now all-Black cast. Stoller decides to rewrite and hire an AI animation company to ensure the movie stays within budget and deadline. Further debate about representation prompts Matt to consult Ice Cube, who sees no problem with it. The Kool-Aid Movie lead announcement at Anaheim Comic-Con is rapturously received until an audience member asks about the use of AI animation. Stoller runs away to avoid answering and Ice Cube walks out in disgust, leaving Matt to face the crowd's booing alone.
8	"The Golden Globes"	Seth Rogen & Evan Goldberg	Alex Gregory	May 7, 2025
At the Golden Globe Awards, Matt fears not being thanked by director Zoë Kravitz for greenlighting her Patty-produced nominated movie Open, even though she seems ambivalent about potentially winning. Matt grows insecure due to other studio heads like Ted Sarandos being thanked; Sal also becomes the star of the show after Adam Scott thanking him for letting him sleep on his couch 20 years ago turns into a recurring joke throughout the evening via host Ramy Youssef's banter and speeches by Quinta Brunson, Jean Smart, and Aaron Sorkin. Matt tries to dupe the teleprompter operator into adding his name to Kravitz's acceptance speech but she catches him, revealing she is actually serious about winning and will not change her well-rehearsed speech for Matt, despite his pleading that it would impress his mother. When Open wins, Kravitz thanks Patty and Sal, but her mic cuts out as she thanks Matt, making it inaudible. Though the post-show mood is celebratory with Kravitz and her agent Mitch Weitz finally agreeing to make her next movie, Blackwing, at Continental, Matt gets in his limo and goes home deflated.
9	"CinemaCon"	Seth Rogen & Evan Goldberg	Alex Gregory	May 14, 2025
While preparing in Las Vegas for the presentation of Continental's upcoming slate of films at CinemaCon, Griffin is distracted by the studio's potential sale to Amazon, which would lead to massive changes and lay-offs. Matt convinces him that a strong presentation will prevent the sale. At Matt's hotel suite pre-event party, the 82-year-old Griffin's inebriation with Dave Franco worries the team, who, sober Patty excepted, are also high on potent mushroom chocolates and other drugs. Zöe Kravitz's arrival halts Matt's attempt at ending the party to stop Griffin, and they have to take care of her after she unknowingly ingests the mushrooms. When Griffin goes missing, they search for him as he wanders through the downstairs casino, finally finding him outside by the canal. While they debate cancelling Griffin's speech, he falls onto a gondola and drifts back to the Venetian, where he alights and is found by Patty, whose lingering resentment over Griffin firing her is triggered by his rudeness. She borrows a phone to anonymously call journalist Matt Belloni.
10	"The Presentation"	Seth Rogen & Evan Goldberg	Seth Rogen & Evan Goldberg & Peter Huyck & Alex Gregory & Frida Perez	May 21, 2025
As Griffin frolics and passes out on the Venetian fountain, Patty has a change of heart when the team tells her of Amazon's potential Continental takeover. With CinemaCon starting soon, they disguise Griffin and sneak him Weekend at Bernie's-style past Matt Belloni to get ready in the suite along with Zöe Kravitz. Although most of them are still high on mushrooms, their presentation begins with Dave Franco introducing Alphabet City in character which disguises his bloodied state from getting beat up in the casino. Patty buys time with her The Silver Lake speech while the team convince Kravitz's agent Mitch and publicist Gabby to let her present Blackwing, which she nails before wetting herself backstage. As Nicholas Stoller presents The Kool-Aid Movie, Griffin is still in no shape for his speech, so Matt addresses the crowd while Maya prepares Griffin. Matt brings out the team to pay tribute to them, then introduces Griffin who drops down to the stage via wires. When Griffin is only able to utter "movies" repeatedly, Matt turns it into a back-and-forth chant with the audience as the team – including Griffin who dances while suspended by the wires – ends the presentation triumphantly.

== Production ==
On November 14, 2022, Apple TV+ announced it had acquired and given a straight-to-series order to an untitled showbiz comedy series starring Seth Rogen. The series is executive produced by Rogen, Evan Goldberg, and James Weaver for Point Grey Pictures, and Frida Perez, Peter Huyck, Alex Gregory, Alex McAtee, and Josh Fagen. Production companies involved are Point Grey Pictures and Lionsgate Television. On March 25, 2024, the untitled series co-created by Rogen, Evan Goldberg, Frida Perez, Peter Huyck, and Alex Gregory was named The Studio. Rogen and Goldberg would also co-write and direct the series. It was reported that Catherine O'Hara, Kathryn Hahn, Ike Barinholtz, and Chase Sui Wonders had joined the main cast, and Bryan Cranston, Keyla Monterroso Mejia, and Dewayne Perkins would guest star.

The series began filming in March 2024. It was shot on location in Los Angeles, primarily at Warner Bros. Studios Burbank. The set for the Continental Studios was modeled after Frank Lloyd Wright's Mayan Revival architecture and inspired by the design of the Ennis House. Several filming locations included real homes designed by architect John Lautner, including Harvey House, Reiner-Burchill Residence (aka Silvertop), and Foster Carling House.

In May 2025, the series was renewed for a second season. It began filming in January 2026. O'Hara died on January 30, 2026; she did not film for the second season before her death. In March 2026, the series was filming in Venice. Sarah Polley joined the writing staff for the second season.

== Release ==
The series premiered at SXSW on March 7, 2025, and debuted on Apple TV+ with its first two episodes on March 26, 2025.

== Reception ==
=== Critical response ===
Professional ratings
Aggregate scores
Source	Rating
Metacritic	80/100
Rotten Tomatoes	92%
Review scores
Source	Rating
Consequence	A
The Guardian	4/5 stars
Empire	4/5 stars
The Independent	4/5 stars
IndieWire	B
The Irish Independent	5/5 stars
Financial Times	4/5 stars
San Francisco Chronicle	4/4 stars
The Mercury News	3.5/4 stars
Slant Magazine	2.5/4 stars
The Sunday Times	5/5 stars
TV Insider	5/5 stars

On the review aggregator website Rotten Tomatoes, The Studio has an approval rating of 92% based on 130 reviews with an average rating of 8.3/10. The website's critics consensus reads, "Savvy enough to impress even the most studious of film buffs, The Studio fights the good fight for a better Hollywood while eliciting huge laughs at its expense." Metacritic, which uses a weighted average, gave the series a score of 80 out of 100, based on 42 critics, indicating "universal acclaim".

=== Accolades ===
Award	Date of ceremony	Category	Nominee(s)	Result	Ref.
Golden Trailer Awards	May 29, 2025	Best Comedy (Trailer/Teaser) for a TV/Streaming Series	Apple TV+ / Wild Card Creative Group (for "Movies")	Won	
Golden Trailer Awards	May 29, 2025	Best Comedy (TV Spot) for a TV/Streaming Series	Apple TV+ / Wild Card Creative Group (for "Thank You")	Won	
Golden Trailer Awards	May 29, 2025	Best Comedy Poster for a TV/Streaming Series	Apple TV+ / GrandSon	Won	
Gotham TV Awards	June 2, 2025	Breakthrough Comedy Series	The Studio	Won	
Gotham TV Awards	June 2, 2025	Outstanding Supporting Performance in a Comedy Series	Chase Sui Wonders	Nominated	
Astra TV Awards	June 10, 2025	Best Comedy Series	The Studio	Won	
Astra TV Awards	June 10, 2025	Best Actor in a Comedy Series	Seth Rogen	Won	
Astra TV Awards	June 10, 2025	Best Supporting Actor in a Comedy Series	Ike Barinholtz	Nominated	
Astra TV Awards	June 10, 2025	Best Supporting Actress in a Comedy Series	Catherine O'Hara	Won	
Astra TV Awards	June 10, 2025	Best Supporting Actress in a Comedy Series	Chase Sui Wonders	Nominated	
Astra TV Awards	June 10, 2025	Best Guest Actor in a Comedy Series	Ron Howard	Nominated	
Astra TV Awards	June 10, 2025	Best Guest Actor in a Comedy Series	Martin Scorsese	Nominated	
Astra TV Awards	June 10, 2025	Best Guest Actor in a Comedy Series	Adam Scott	Nominated	
Astra TV Awards	June 10, 2025	Best Guest Actress in a Comedy Series	Zoë Kravitz	Nominated	
Astra TV Awards	June 10, 2025	Best Guest Actress in a Comedy Series	Sarah Polley	Nominated	
Astra TV Awards	June 10, 2025	Best Cast Ensemble in a Streaming Comedy Series	The Studio	Nominated	
Astra TV Awards	June 10, 2025	Best Directing in a Comedy Series	Seth Rogen and Evan Goldberg (for "The Oner")	Won	
Astra TV Awards	June 10, 2025	Best Writing in a Comedy Series	Alex Gregory (for "The Golden Globes")	Nominated	
Astra TV Awards	June 10, 2025	Best Writing in a Comedy Series	Seth Rogen, Evan Goldberg, Peter Huyck, Alex Gregory, and Frida Perez (for "The Promotion")	Nominated	
Set Decorators Society of America Awards	August 10, 2025	Best Achievement in Décor/Design of a Half-Hour Single-Camera Series	Claire Kaufman and Julie Berghoff	Won	
Television Critics Association Awards	August 20, 2025	Program of the Year	The Studio	Nominated	
Television Critics Association Awards	August 20, 2025	Outstanding Achievement in Comedy	The Studio	Won	
Television Critics Association Awards	August 20, 2025	Outstanding New Program	The Studio	Nominated	
Television Critics Association Awards	August 20, 2025	Individual Achievement in Comedy	Seth Rogen	Nominated	
Location Managers Guild Awards	August 23, 2025	Outstanding Locations in Contemporary Television	Stacey Brashear, Martin J. Cummins	Won	
Primetime Creative Arts Emmy Awards	September 6, 2025	Outstanding Guest Actor in a Comedy Series	Bryan Cranston (for "CinemaCon")	Won	
Primetime Creative Arts Emmy Awards	September 6, 2025	Outstanding Guest Actor in a Comedy Series	Dave Franco (for "CinemaCon")	Nominated	
Primetime Creative Arts Emmy Awards	September 6, 2025	Outstanding Guest Actor in a Comedy Series	Anthony Mackie (for "The Note")	Nominated	
Primetime Creative Arts Emmy Awards	September 6, 2025	Outstanding Guest Actor in a Comedy Series	Martin Scorsese (for "The Promotion")	Nominated	
Primetime Creative Arts Emmy Awards	September 6, 2025	Outstanding Guest Actor in a Comedy Series	Ron Howard (for "The Note")	Nominated	
Primetime Creative Arts Emmy Awards	September 6, 2025	Outstanding Guest Actress in a Comedy Series	Zoë Kravitz (for "The Presentation")	Nominated	
Primetime Creative Arts Emmy Awards	September 6, 2025	Outstanding Casting for a Comedy Series	Melissa Kostenbauder and Francine Maisler	Won	
Primetime Creative Arts Emmy Awards	September 6, 2025	Outstanding Cinematography for a Series (Half-Hour)	Adam Newport-Berra (for "The Oner")	Won	
Primetime Creative Arts Emmy Awards	September 6, 2025	Outstanding Contemporary Costumes for a Series	Kameron Lennox, Betsy Glick, and Tyler Kinney (for "CinemaCon")	Won	
Primetime Creative Arts Emmy Awards	September 6, 2025	Outstanding Contemporary Hairstyling	Vanessa Price, Alexandra Ford, and Lauren McKeever (for "CinemaCon")	Nominated	
Primetime Creative Arts Emmy Awards	September 6, 2025	Outstanding Music Composition for a Series (Original Dramatic Score)	Antonio Sánchez (for "The Missing Reel")	Nominated	
Primetime Creative Arts Emmy Awards	September 6, 2025	Outstanding Music Supervision	Gabe Hilfer (for "The Promotion")	Won	
Primetime Creative Arts Emmy Awards	September 6, 2025	Outstanding Picture Editing for a Single-Camera Comedy Series	Eric Kissack (for "The Promotion")	Won	
Primetime Creative Arts Emmy Awards	September 6, 2025	Outstanding Production Design for a Narrative Program (Half-Hour)	Julie Berghoff, Brian Grego, and Claire Kaufman (for "The Note")	Won	
Primetime Creative Arts Emmy Awards	September 6, 2025	Outstanding Sound Editing for a Comedy or Drama Series (Half-Hour)	George Haddad, Borja Sau, Lloyd Stuart Martin, Randy Wilson, Justin Helle, Lorena Perez Batista, Jason Charbonneau, and Stefan Fraticelli (for "The Golden Globes")	Won	
Primetime Creative Arts Emmy Awards	September 6, 2025	Outstanding Sound Mixing for a Comedy or Drama Series (Half-Hour) and Animation	Lindsey Alvarez, Fred Howard, Buck Robinson, and Ron Mellegers (for "The Golden Globes")	Won	
Primetime Emmy Awards	September 14, 2025	Outstanding Comedy Series	Seth Rogen, Evan Goldberg, Peter Huyck, Alex Gregory, James Weaver, Alex McAtee, Josh Fagen, Frida Perez, and Jesse Sternbaum	Won	
Primetime Emmy Awards	September 14, 2025	Outstanding Lead Actor in a Comedy Series	Seth Rogen (for "The Pediatric Oncologist")	Won	
Primetime Emmy Awards	September 14, 2025	Outstanding Supporting Actor in a Comedy Series	Ike Barinholtz (for "The War")	Nominated	
Primetime Emmy Awards	September 14, 2025	Outstanding Supporting Actress in a Comedy Series	Kathryn Hahn (for "Casting")	Nominated	
Primetime Emmy Awards	September 14, 2025	Outstanding Supporting Actress in a Comedy Series	Catherine O'Hara (for "The Promotion")	Nominated	
Primetime Emmy Awards	September 14, 2025	Outstanding Directing for a Comedy Series	Seth Rogen and Evan Goldberg (for "The Oner")	Won	
Primetime Emmy Awards	September 14, 2025	Outstanding Writing for a Comedy Series	Seth Rogen, Evan Goldberg, Peter Huyck, Alex Gregory, and Frida Perez (for "The Promotion")	Won	
Hollywood Music in Media Awards	November 19, 2025	Original Score – TV Show/Limited Series	Antonio Sánchez	Nominated	
Critics' Choice Awards	January 4, 2026	Best Comedy Series	The Studio	Won	
Critics' Choice Awards	January 4, 2026	Best Actor in a Comedy Series	Seth Rogen	Won	
Critics' Choice Awards	January 4, 2026	Best Supporting Actor in a Comedy Series	Ike Barinholtz	Won	
Golden Globe Awards	January 11, 2026	Best Television Series – Musical or Comedy	The Studio	Won	
Golden Globe Awards	January 11, 2026	Best Actor in a Television Series – Musical or Comedy	Seth Rogen	Won	
Golden Globe Awards	January 11, 2026	Best Supporting Actress – Television	Catherine O'Hara	Nominated	
Film Independent Spirit Awards	February 15, 2026	Best Lead Performance in a New Scripted Series	Seth Rogen	Nominated	
Actor Awards	March 1, 2026	Outstanding Performance by a Male Actor in a Comedy Series	Seth Rogen	Won	
Actor Awards	March 1, 2026	Outstanding Performance by a Male Actor in a Comedy Series	Ike Barinholtz	Nominated	
Actor Awards	March 1, 2026	Outstanding Performance by a Female Actor in a Comedy Series	Kathryn Hahn	Nominated	
Actor Awards	March 1, 2026	Outstanding Performance by a Female Actor in a Comedy Series	Catherine O'Hara	Won	
Actor Awards	March 1, 2026	Outstanding Performance by an Ensemble in a Comedy Series	Ike Barinholtz, Kathryn Hahn, Catherine O'Hara, Seth Rogen, and Chase Sui Wonders	Won	
Satellite Awards	March 8, 2026	Best Actor in a Comedy or Musical Series	Seth Rogen	Won	
Satellite Awards	March 8, 2026	Best Actress in a Supporting Role in a Series, Miniseries & Limited Series, or Motion Picture Made for Television	Catherine O'Hara	Nominated	
British Academy Television Awards	May 10, 2026	Best International Programme	Seth Rogen, Evan Goldberg, Alex Gregory, Pete Hyuck, Frida Perez, and James Weaver	Won	
