= Adam Newport-Berra =

American cinematographer

- Born: Corvallis, Oregon, U.S.
- Occupation: Cinematographer
- Years active: 2007–present
- Website: https://adamnewportberra.com/

Adam Newport-Berra is an American cinematographer. He won a Primetime Emmy Award in the category Outstanding Cinematography for his work on the television program The Studio.
