= Eric Kissack =

American film editor, director and producer

- Born: 15 April 1977 (age 49); New York City, United States
- Education: Brown University
- Occupations: Editor, director, producer
- Years active: 2007 - present
- Spouse: Libby Cuenin (m. 2013)
- Website: erickissack.com

Eric Kissack is an American film editor, director and producer. Films Kissack has edited include A Very Harold & Kumar 3D Christmas (2011), Horrible Bosses 2 (2014) and Daddy's Home (2015).

== Early life and career ==
Kissack was born and raised in New York City. He attended Hunter College High School and attended Brown University in 1999. He established his profession as a film editor with Role Models, Brüno, Cedar Rapids, The Dictator, Horrible Bosses 2, Daddy's Home and Instant Family. His directorial debut was Love, Sex & Missed Connections.

== Filmography ==
Year	Title	Language	Director	Editor	Producer	Notes
2007	The Ten	English	No	Yes	No	
2008	Birds of America	English	No	Yes	No	
2009	Role Models	English	No	Yes	No	
2009	Brüno	English	No	Yes	No	Co-edited with Jonathan Scott Corn
2011	A Very Harold & Kumar 3D Christmas	English	No	Yes	No	
2011	Harold & Kumar	English	No	Yes	No	
2011	Cedar Rapids	English	No	Yes	No	
2012	The Dictator	English	No	Yes	No	
2012	Veep	English	No	Yes	No	Television series
2012	Love, Sex and Missed Connections	English	Yes	No	No	Directorial debut
2014	The Gunfighter	English	Yes	No	No	Short comedy
2015	Horrible Bosses 2	English	No	Yes	No	
2015	Daddy's Home	English	No	Yes	No	Co-edited with Brad Wilhite
2016-2020	The Good Place	English	No	Yes	Yes	Television series
2018	Instant Family	English	No	No	Yes	Co-produced with Sean Anders, Stephen Levinson, John Morris (filmmaker), Mark Wahlberg
2019	Black Monday	English	No	Yes	No	Television series
2019	The Selection	English	Yes	No	Yes	Limited series; Spin-off of The Good Place
2025	The Studio	English	No	Yes	No	Television series
2026	Spider-Noir	English	No	Yes	No	Television series

== Awards ==
Year	Award	Film	Category	Result	Notes
2012	Traverse City Film Festival	Love, Sex and Missed Connections	Best Director	Won	Special Jury Prize - First-Time Director
2012	Cleveland International Film Festival	Love, Sex and Missed Connections	American language Independent Award	Won	Sponsored by Alan and Marta Glazen
2014	Los Angeles Film Festival	The Gunfighter	Best Short film	Won	Audience Choice Awards
2015	San Diego International Film Festival	The Gunfighter	Best Director	Won	Audience Choice Awards
2015	Reel Shorts Film Festival	The Gunfighter	Best Director	Won	Audience Choice Awards
2015	Saatchi & Saatchi	The Gunfighter	Short film	Exhibition	
2017	Emmy Award	Veep	Best Editor	Nominated	Groundbreaking
2019	American Cinema Editors Awards 2019	The Good Place	Best Editor	Nominated	Best edited comedy series for commercial television
2020	American Cinema Editors Awards 2020	The Good Place	Best Editor	Nominated	Best edited comedy series for commercial television
2025	Emmy Award	The Studio	Best Editing for a Comedy Series	Won	
