= Ice Chips (The Bear) =

- The Bear episode
- Episode no.: Season 3 Episode 8
- Directed by: Christopher Storer
- Written by: Joanna Calo
- Cinematography by: Andrew Wehde
- Editing by: Megan Mancini
- Production code: XCBV3008
- Original air date: June 26, 2024
- Running time: 40 minutes

Guest appearances
- Jamie Lee Curtis as Donna Berzatto; Chris Witaske as Pete; Ricky Staffieri as Theodore "Teddy" Fak; Keith Kupferer as Dr. Levin

Episode chronology
| ← Previous "Legacy" | Next → "Apologies" |
- The Bear season 3

"Ice Chips" is the eighth episode of the third season of the American television comedy-drama The Bear. It is the 26th overall episode of the series and was written by executive producer Joanna Calo, and directed by series creator Christopher Storer. It was released on Hulu on June 26, 2024, along with the rest of the season.

The series follows Carmen "Carmy" Berzatto, an award-winning New York City chef de cuisine, who returns to his hometown of Chicago to run his late brother Michael's failing Italian beef sandwich shop. In the episode, their sister Natalie goes into labor, and she is forced to call their mother Donna to help her. This is the first episode where Ebon Moss-Bachrach does not appear, although he is still credited. With this, no main cast member appeared in all episodes of the series.

The episode was met with positive reviews, with Abby Elliott and Jamie Lee Curtis receiving praise for their performances.

== Plot ==
Stuck in the traffic, an agitated Natalie (Abby Elliott) tries calling Pete, Sydney, Carmy, Marcus, Richie, and Claire, but no one is able to respond due to the start of service, when cell phones are locked in lockers. Her car's voice recognition system repeatedly responds to her request to "call Claire" by calling the Bear instead. Fed up and after being yelled at by another car driver, she pulls up the car next to the highway. With no other contacts, she is forced to call her mother, Donna (Jamie Lee Curtis).

Natalie meets with Donna at the hospital's parking lot, and she is frustrated by her mother's attempts to calm her down. At her hospital room, Donna successfully helps calm Natalie down during her contractions. Natalie talks to the staff about her birth plan and her hope for avoiding an epidural. Donna then talks about her experience during the births of Mikey and Carmy. Natalie's obstetrician, Dr. Levin (Keith Kupferer), explains the process and gives Natalie the option of either oxytocin/pitocin. As they await for further instructions, Natalie reveals she did not tell Donna about her pregnancy due to fear over spreading the family's dysfunction to her child.

As Natalie laments the predicament she placed on Donna, Donna states she will be a good mother, also telling her she is trying to do better as a mother to Natalie and Carmy. She then tells the story of Natalie's birth, which was accompanied by the song "Baby, I Love You". Pete (Chris Witaske) finally arrives, and thanks Donna for staying with Natalie. As Pete comforts Natalie, Donna quietly exits and stays in the waiting room. Fak (Matty Matheson) and Theodore (Ricky Staffieri) arrive to console an emotionally drained Donna, who is overjoyed to become a grandmother.

== Production ==
=== Development ===
In May 2024, Hulu confirmed that the eighth episode of the season would be titled "Ice Chips", and was to be written by executive producer Joanna Calo, and directed by series creator Christopher Storer. It was Calo's sixth writing credit and Storer's 17th directing credit.

=== Filming ===
According cinematographer Andrew Wehde, "Before Sugar gets to the hospital, there's an experience she's going through with her contractions that is hyper-intense, hyper-realistic. We wanted it to be direct sunlight, we wanted it to be harsh, we wanted it to be handheld. Everything we might do as filmmakers to make it look pretty, we got rid of it. From the parking lot to walking up and Donna [Jamie Lee Curtis] entering the frame, there's a barrage of overwhelming information for the senses. Then you see Sugar in the hospital room, and there's a level of peace." Abby Elliott broke her ankle the weekend before filming and wore an orthopedic boot for the scenes where Sugar is laboring in Chicago gridlock traffic and walking through the parking lot with Donna.

The hospital scenes were shot at Endeavor Health Skokie Hospital in Skokie, Illinois. The hospital-room scenes were shot in two takes with three cameras, the first shooting Abby Elliott, the second shooting Jamie Lee Curtis, and a third set at the foot of the bed to capture both of them in frame for "two-shots." Per Wehde, Storer declared the first take "safe" and television-ready, so they used the second take more experimentally: "They basically performed a play from start to finish in that room...[with the second take], we really started to get some dynamic stuff, the shots that feel like The Bear, the big zoom-ins, the focus transitions to Abby, things like that. It was a tour de force from the actors, and all we had to do was capture it." Camera operator Gary Malouf stated, "I think that there's something that really fascinating about how once you get thrown into the fire, it's like we're all in this together. The hierarchy of a film set gets thrown out the window. It's no longer Oscar-winning actor and hack camera operator, it's just two people trying to figure it out together. That was a very exciting thing as a storyteller and filmmaker, and just as somebody who really loves doing what I do. It was different than anything I've ever been a part of, and all of that comes through on camera...We did two takes, and they just went through it. They did 27 pages all at once."

Abby Elliott prepared for performing contractions onscreen by having someone record her when she was in real-life labor with her second child in June 2023. She later told a reporter that realistic labor pain "was such a big focus of mine to make it seem extremely realistic and have you almost feel the pain with me. And yeah, it definitely helped having done it twice now...Sugar is now stuck in a birthing room with the last person she wants to be with, but also the person that she needs there, who's the closest to her, who's also gone through labor. She needs to feel reassured in this calm manner [but] then Donna will go on a rant about her having her father's ass and Sugar's like, 'What? That's not what I need from you right now.' And then she surprises her and tells her this comforting birth story and holds her."

=== Picture editing and sound design ===
"Ice Chips" was edited by Megan Mancini. According to staff editor Joanna Naugle, the background sounds in the hospital were carefully dialed to the mood in Sugar's hospital room, stating that Steve "Major" Giammaria and SFX editor Jonathan Fuhrer we're "layering in sounds of people talking outside, machines beeping, and people wheeling things down the hallway. As we get into the more intimate part of the conversation, where we use more close-ups, the outside sounds melt away, so you're not distracted by them."

== Reception ==
=== Critical reviews ===
"Ice Chips" was positively received by critics. The Boston Globe critic described it as "a lovely détente, and its power comes not only from the sharp script but from Elliott and Curtis, who are both extraordinarily good." Jenna Scherer of The A.V. Club gave the episode an "A" grade and wrote, "I expected 'Ice Chips' to start out bad and only get worse, like 'Fishes.' (I don't know about you, but I was so sure that Donna was lying when she assured Nat that she'd called Pete.) But Calo and episode writer Christopher Storer give us something far more cathartic—and far more surprising."

Marah Eakin of Vulture gave the episode a 4 star out of 5 rating and wrote, "The episode does a great job getting that across, timing out Natalie's contractions in what feels like real-time. We're not there for the whole birth—that would be an hours-long episode—but the direction and cinematography of the run-up feel real. Jamie Lee Curtis and Abby Elliott look how they look, crying and mussed hair, and there's no over-the-top comedic screaming or wacko water breaking." A.J. Daulerio of Decider wrote, "This season's Big Panic comes from Sugar's impending childbirth. And unlike the constant YELLING of those other episodes, 'Ice Chips' relies on uncomfortable silences and unspoken trauma to ramp up the anxiety."

Brady Langmann of Esquire wrote, "I'll spare the details, but Mrs. Berzatto recalls seeing a beautiful fish tank. She was sad to walk away from it but found solace in the fact that other people would experience and enjoy the sight, too. Take from that what you will, but maybe Mrs. Berzatto feels that—between Michael, Carmy, and Sugar—she ultimately raised a generation of Berzattos that'll leave the world better than she did." Natalie Zamora of Show Snob wrote, "'Ice Chips' is certainly one of the more emotional episodes of The Bear season 3, giving us much-needed moments between Natalie and Donna. There are only two episodes of the season left of the season, and I can't wait to see where it goes next."

=== Accolades ===
| Award | Category | Nominee(s) | Result | Ref. |
|---|---|---|---|---|
| Primetime Creative Arts Emmy Awards | Outstanding Guest Actress in a Comedy Series | Jamie Lee Curtis | Nominated | |
