= Primetime Emmy Award for Outstanding Guest Actress in a Comedy Series =

Award for actresses

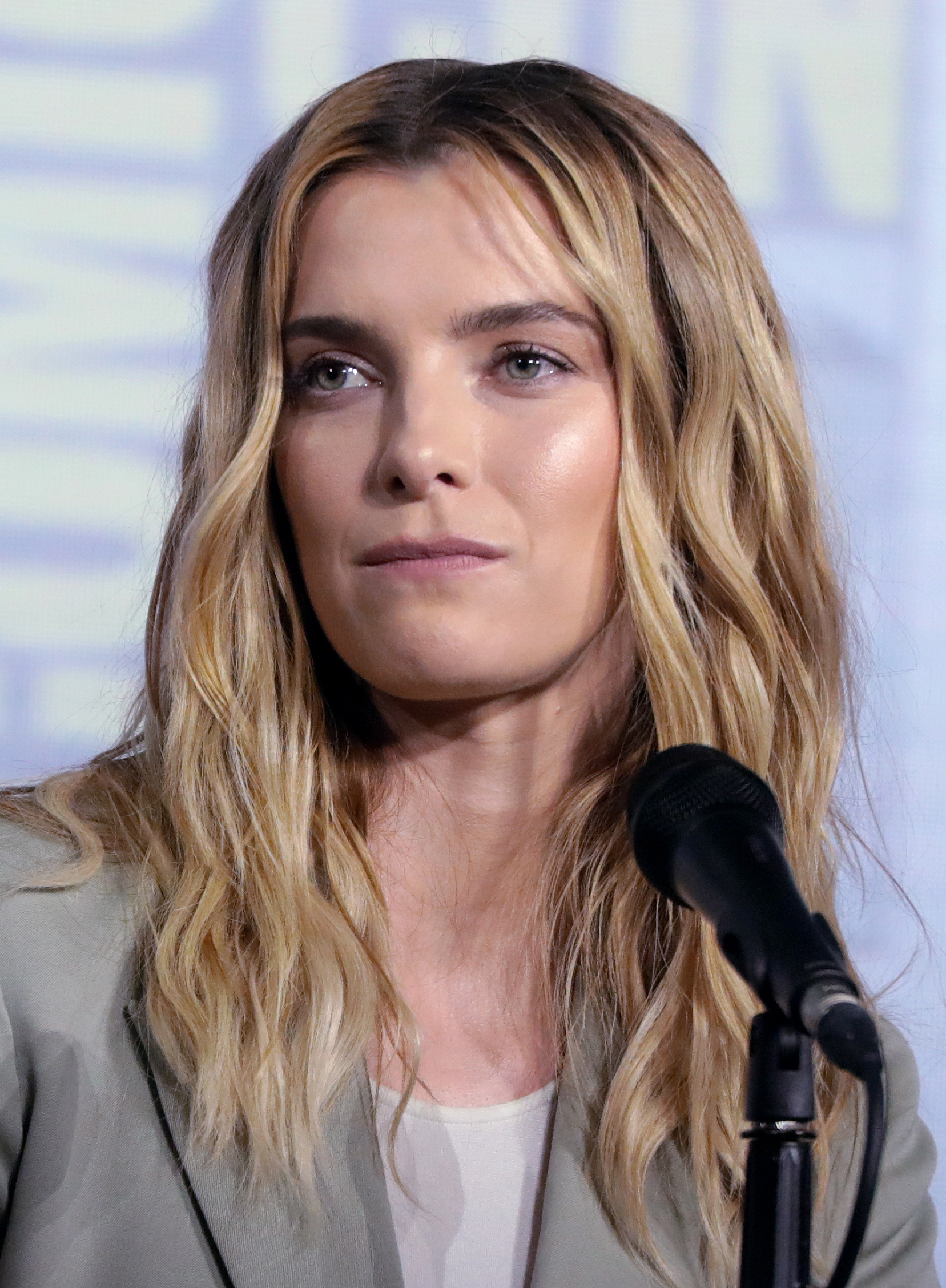
- The 2026 recipient: Betty Gilpin
- Awarded for: Outstanding Guest Actress in a Comedy Series
- Country: United States
- Presented by: Academy of Television Arts & Sciences
- First award: 1986
- Currently held by: Betty Gilpin, Widow's Bay (2026)
- Website: emmys.com

This is a list of winners and nominees of the Primetime Emmy Award for Outstanding Guest Actress in a Comedy Series. Prior to 1989, the category was not gender-specific, and, thus, was called Outstanding Guest Performer in a Comedy Series. It is given in honor to an actress who has delivered an outstanding performance in a guest-starring role in a television comedy series. The current recipient is Betty Gilpin for Widow's Bay. Since the category change in 1989, a total of 34 actresses were awarded for their performances. The most awarded actress is Cloris Leachman, with 3 wins, followed by Tina Fey, Colleen Dewhurst, Kathryn Joosten, Jean Smart, Tracey Ullman, Betty White, and Maya Rudolph, with 2 wins. These awards, like the other "Guest" awards, were previously not presented at the Primetime Emmy Award ceremony, but, rather, at the Creative Arts Emmy Award ceremony.

Beginning with the 77th Primetime Emmy Awards, performers are no longer eligible in guest acting categories if they were previously nominated for a lead or supporting award for playing the same character role in the same series.

== Winners and nominations ==
Indicates the winner

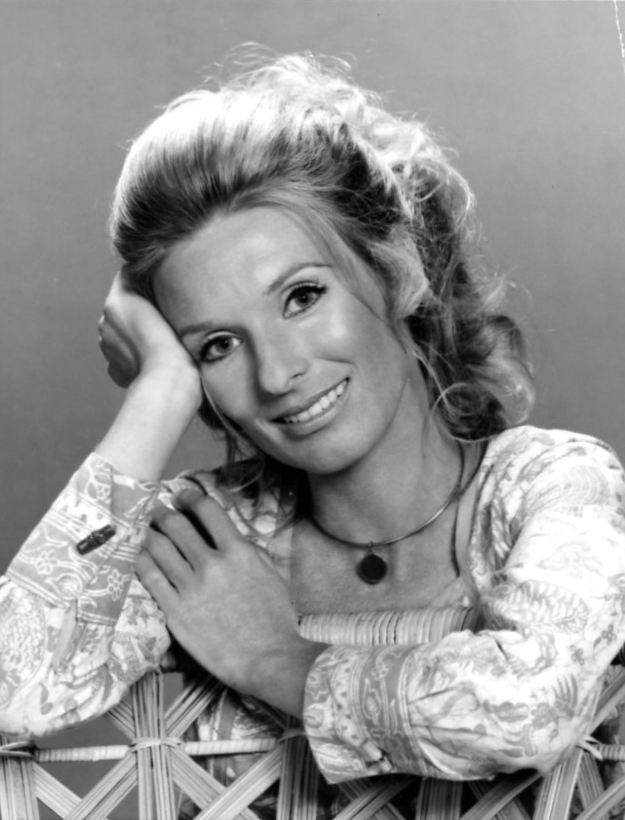
Cloris Leachman won thrice for The Mary Tyler Moore Show (1975) and Malcolm in the Middle (2002, 2006)

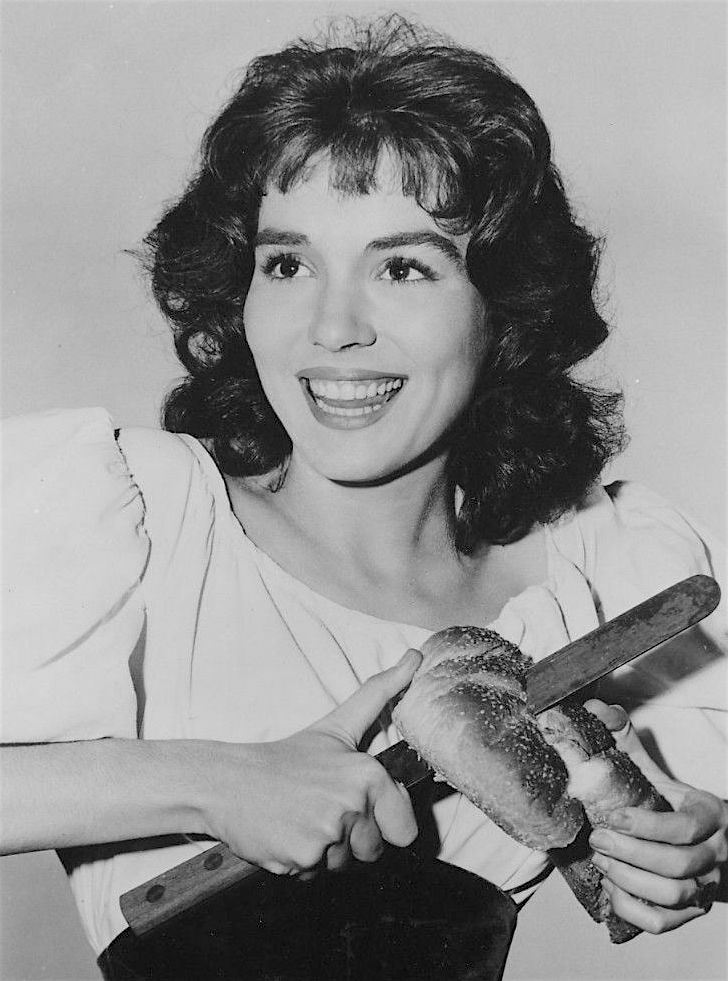
Zohra Lampert won for Kojack (1975)

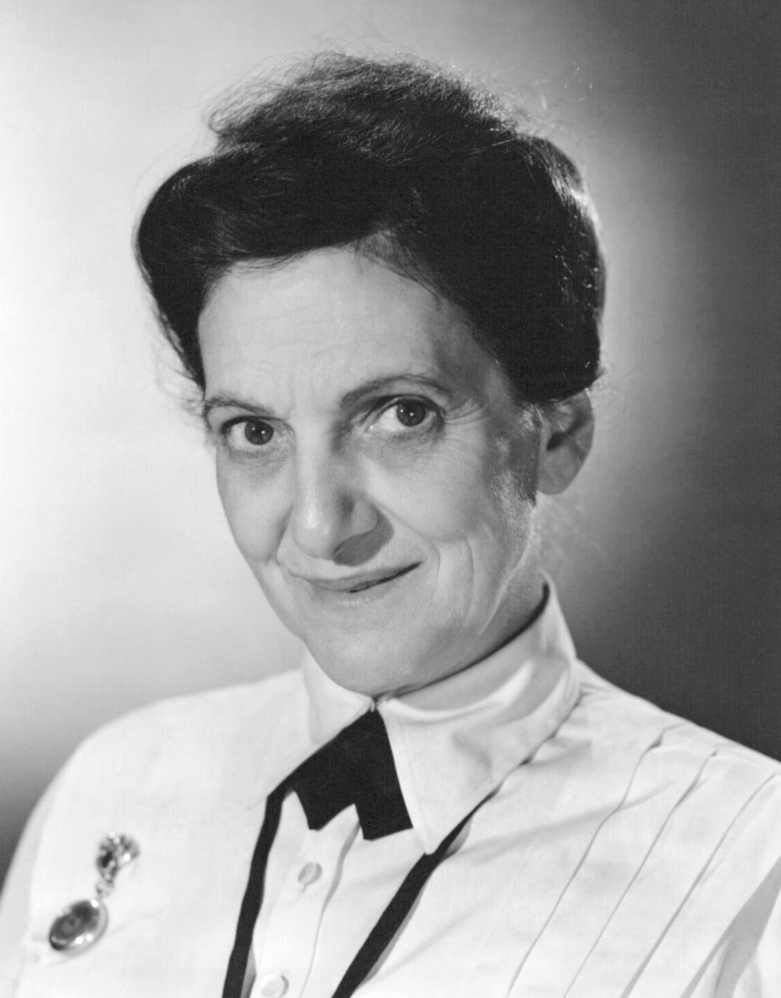
Beulah Bondi won for The Waltons (1977)

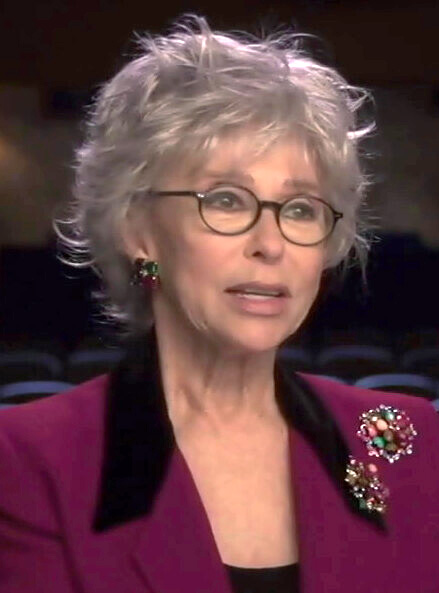
Rita Moreno won for The Rockford Files (1978)

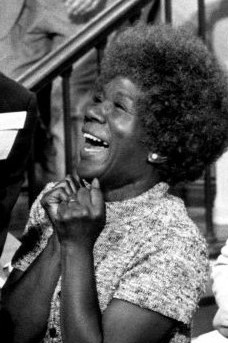
Beah Richards for Frank's Place (1988)

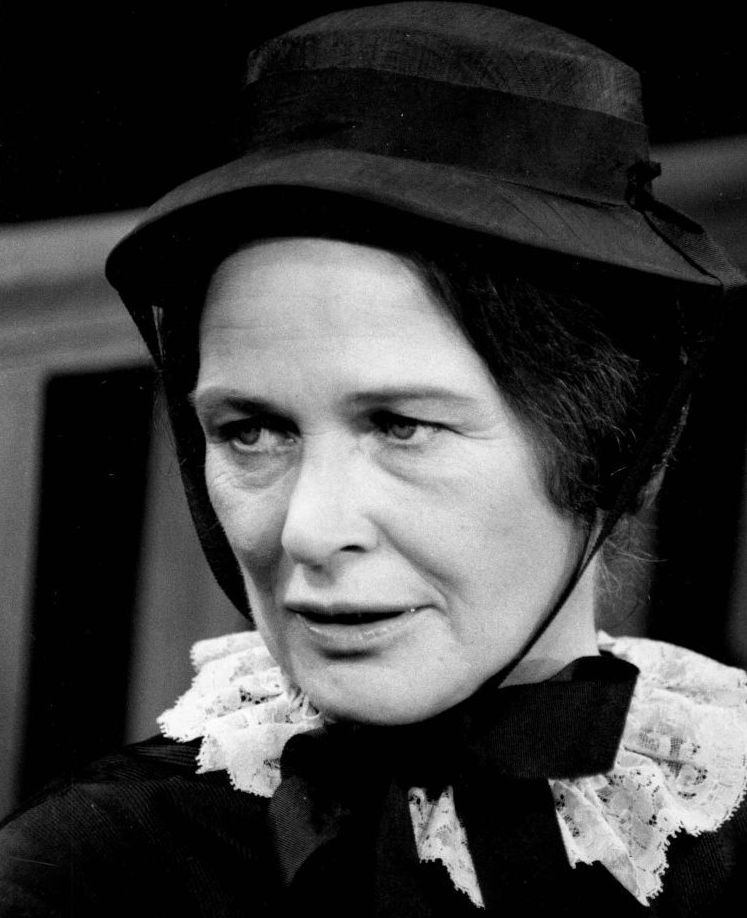
Colleen Dewhurst won for twice for Murphy Brown in 1989 and 1992

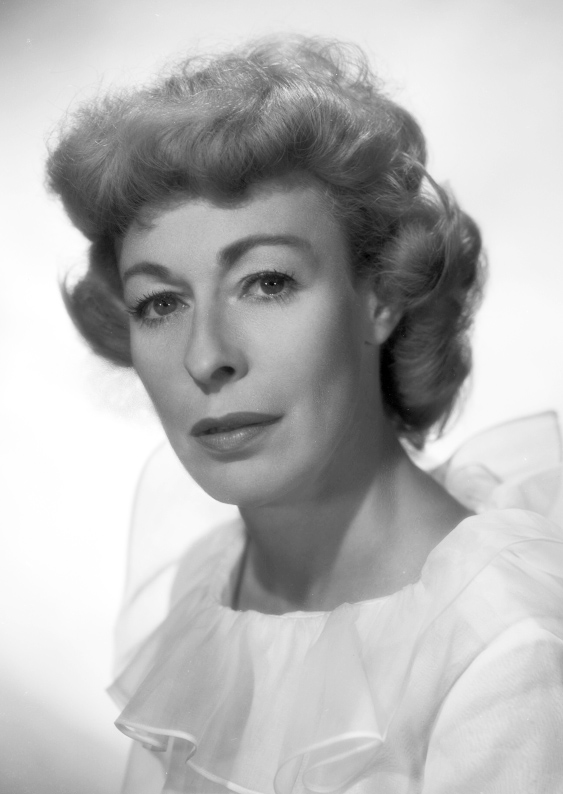
Eileen Heckart won for Love & War (1994)

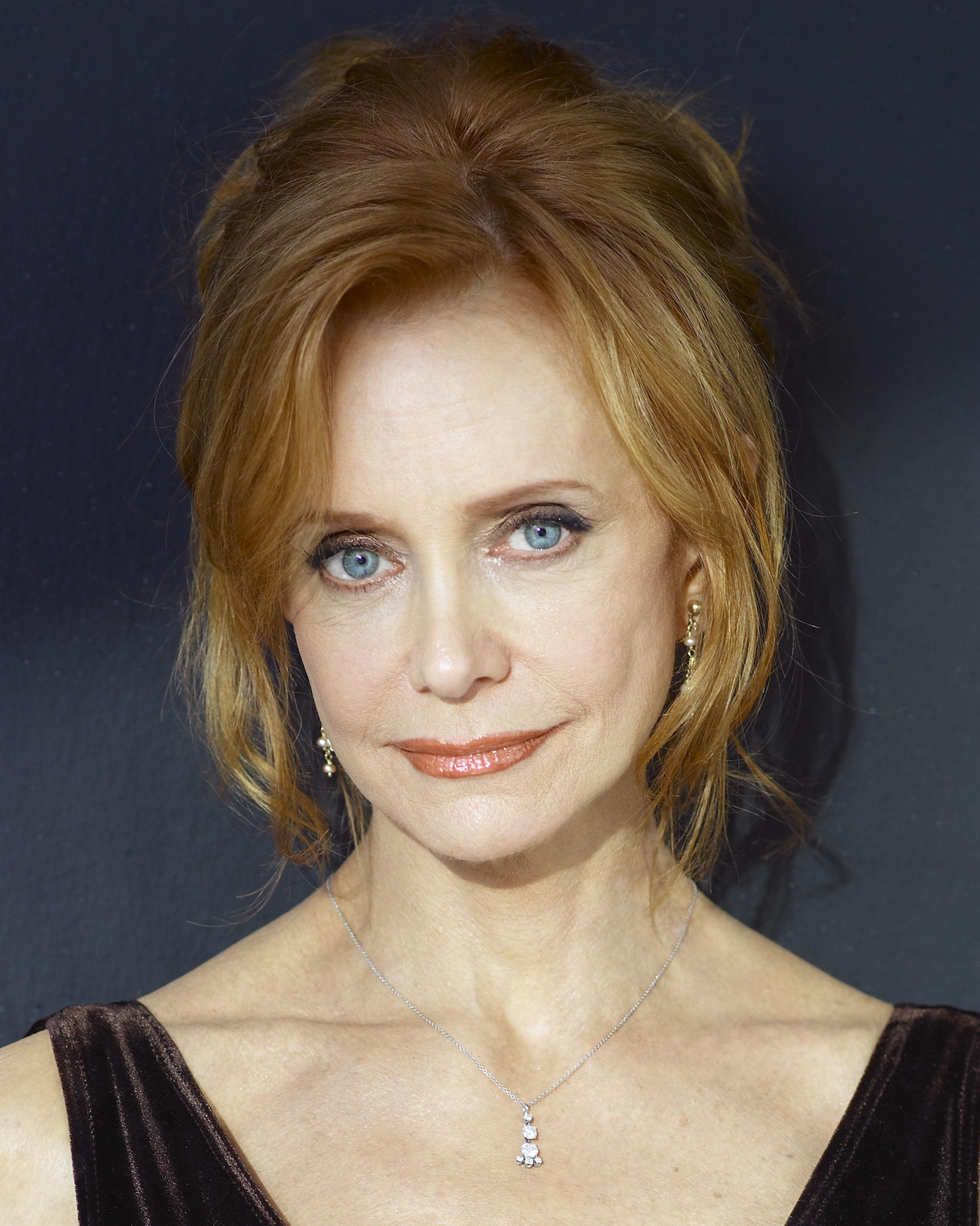
Swoosie Kurtz won for Carol & Company (1990).

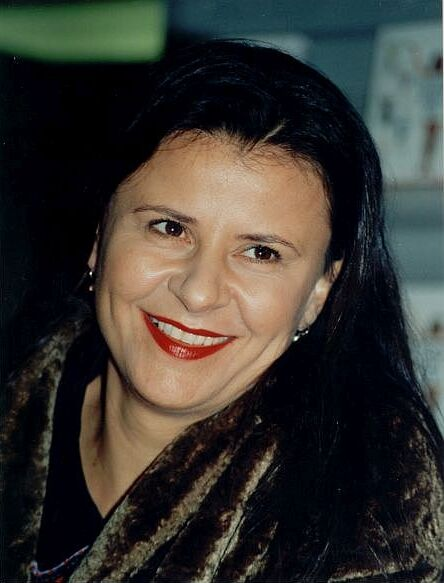
Tracey Ullman won twice for Love & War (1993) and Mad About You (1999)

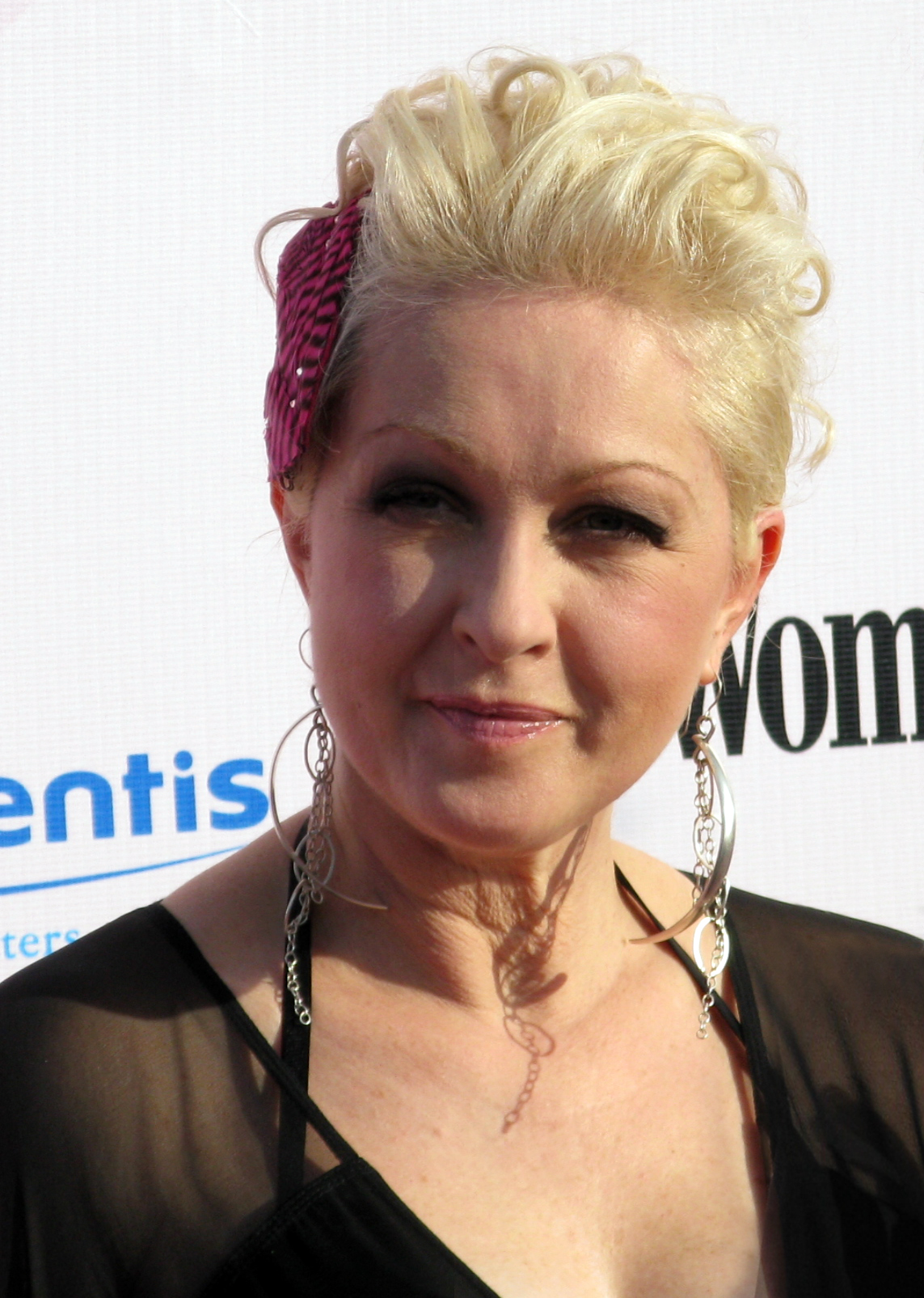
Cyndi Lauper won for Mad About You (1995)

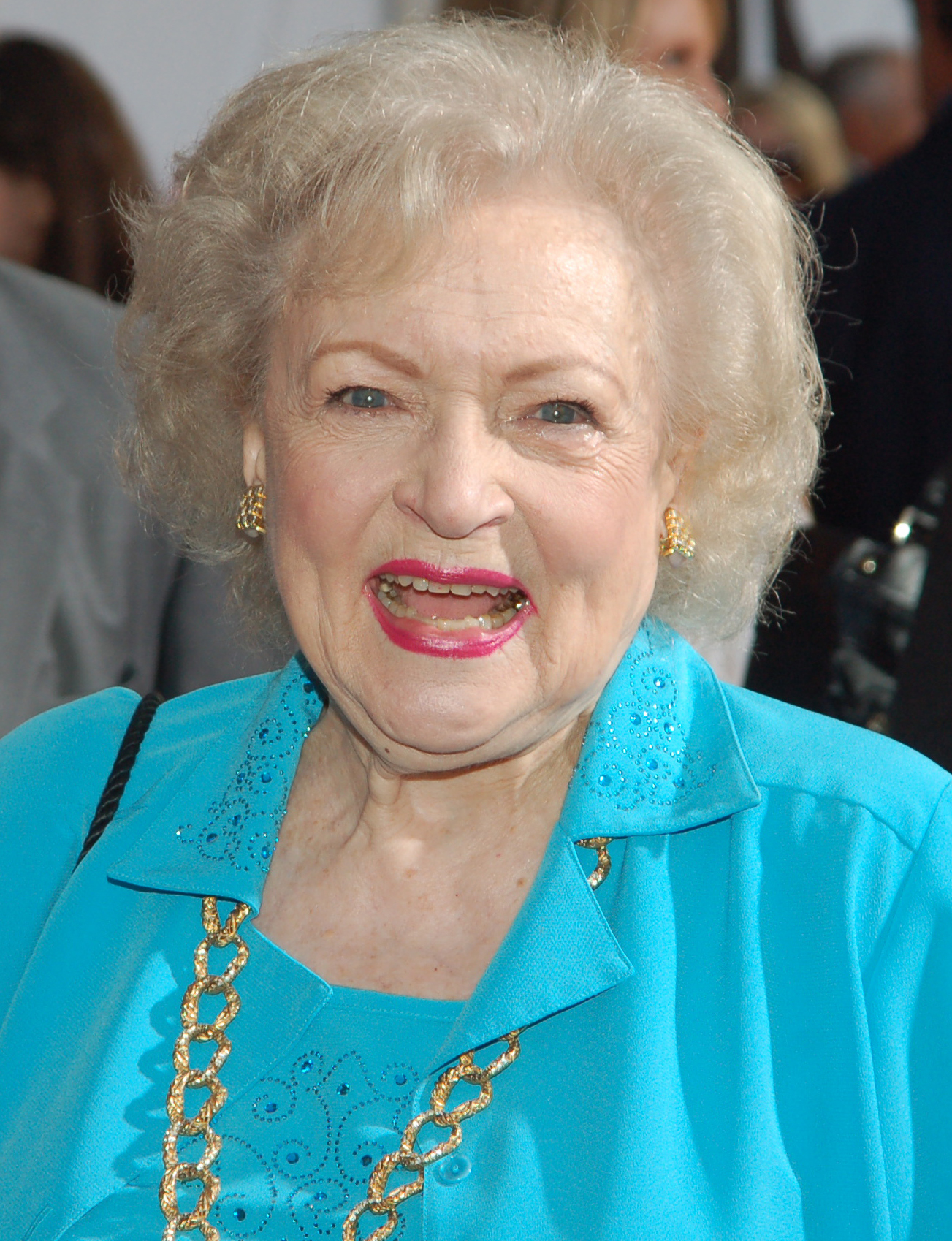
Betty White won twice for The John Larroquette Show (1996) and Saturday Night Live (2010)

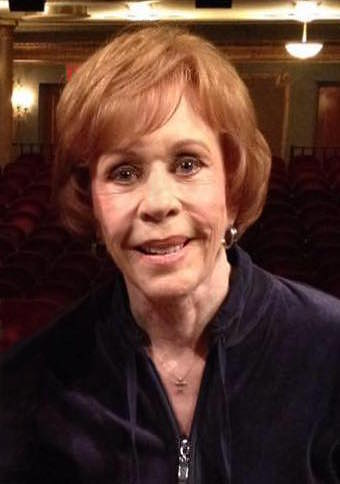
Carol Burnett won for Mad About You (1997)

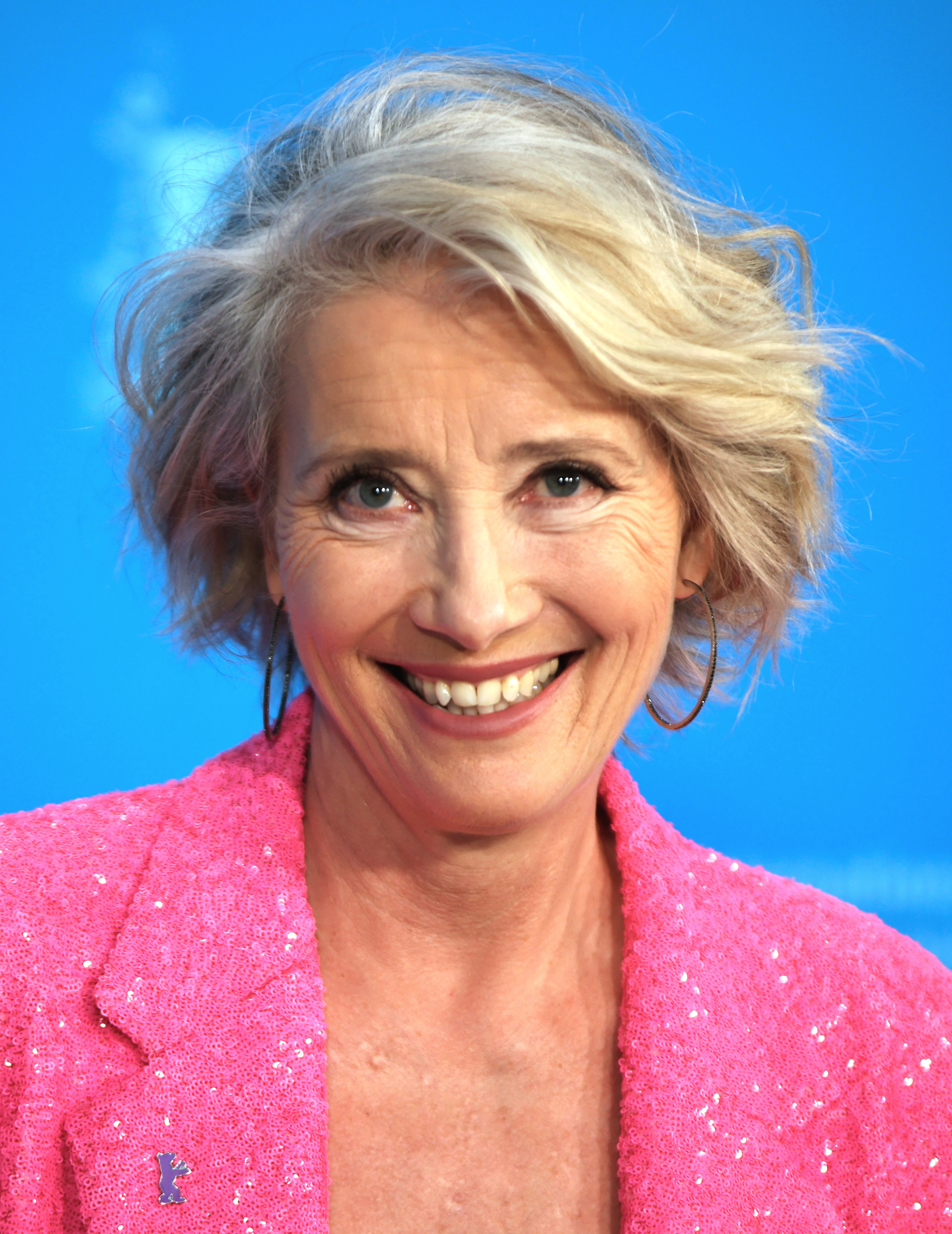
Emma Thompson won for Ellen (1998)

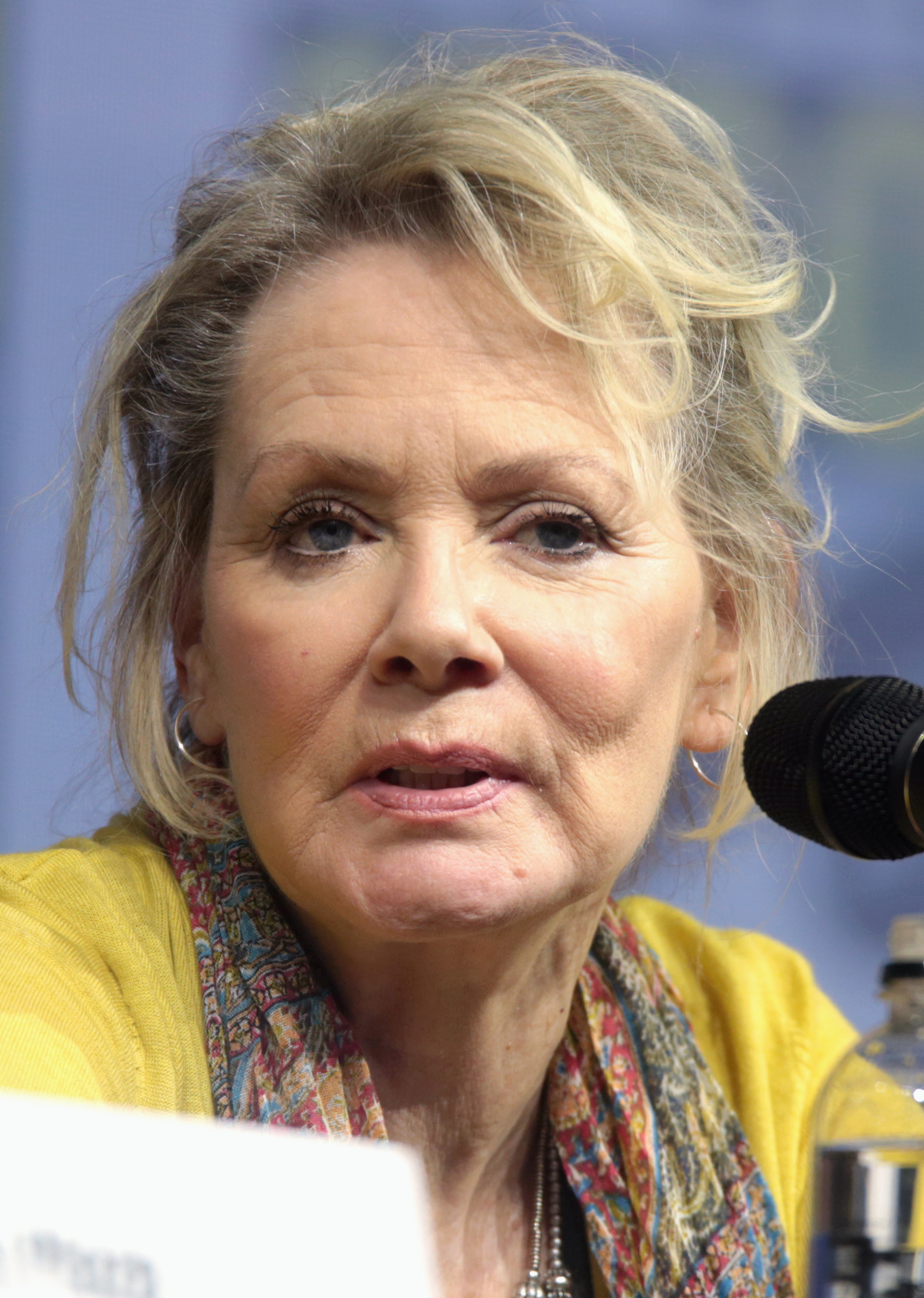
Jean Smart won twice consecutively for Frasier in 2000, and 2001.

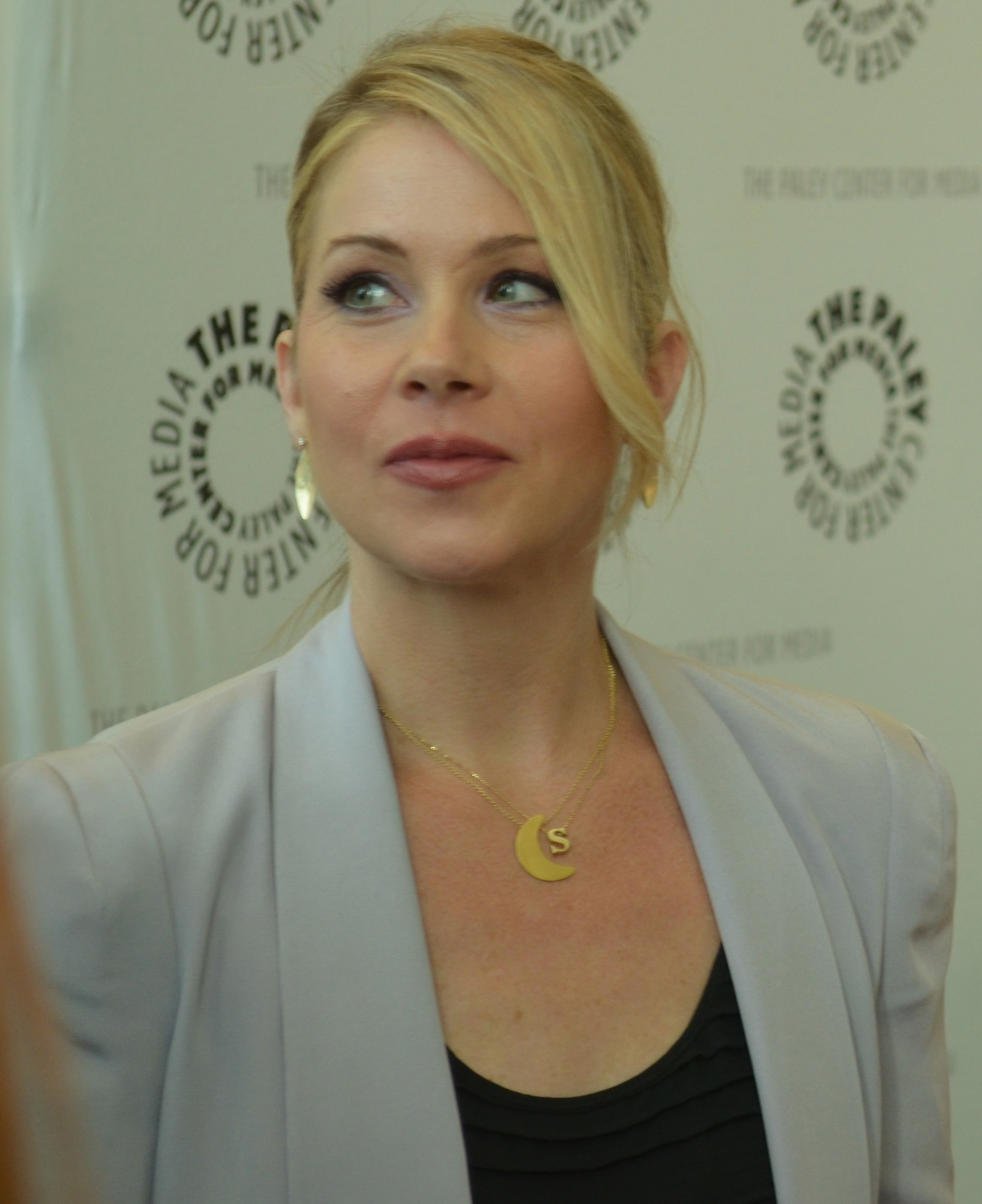
Christina Applegate won for Friends (2003).

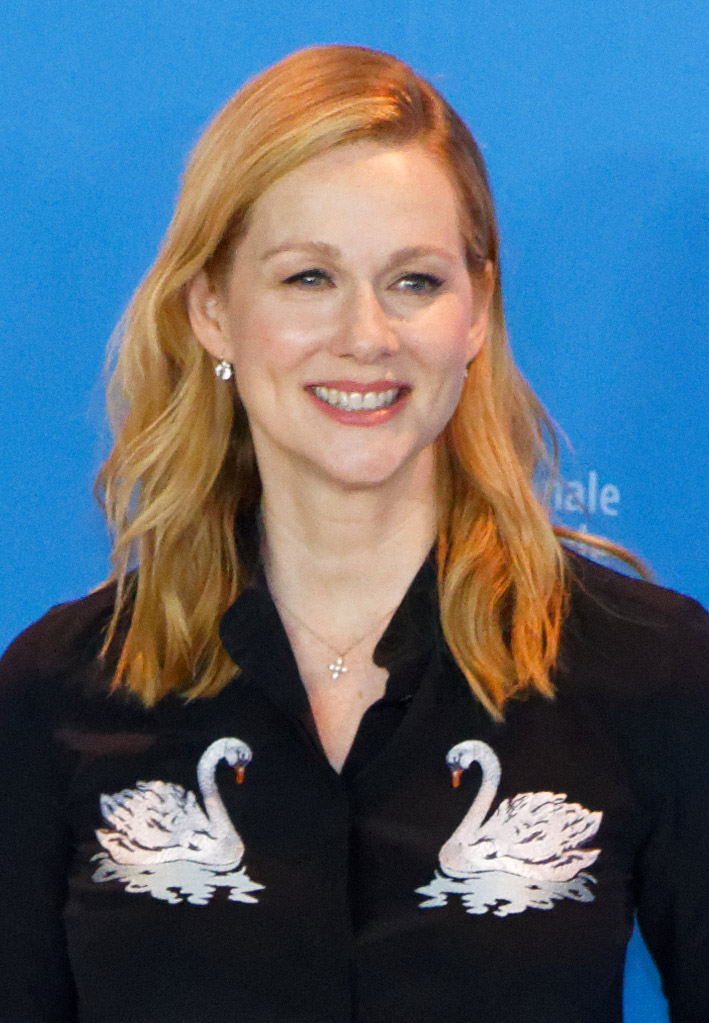
Laura Linney won for Frasier (2004).

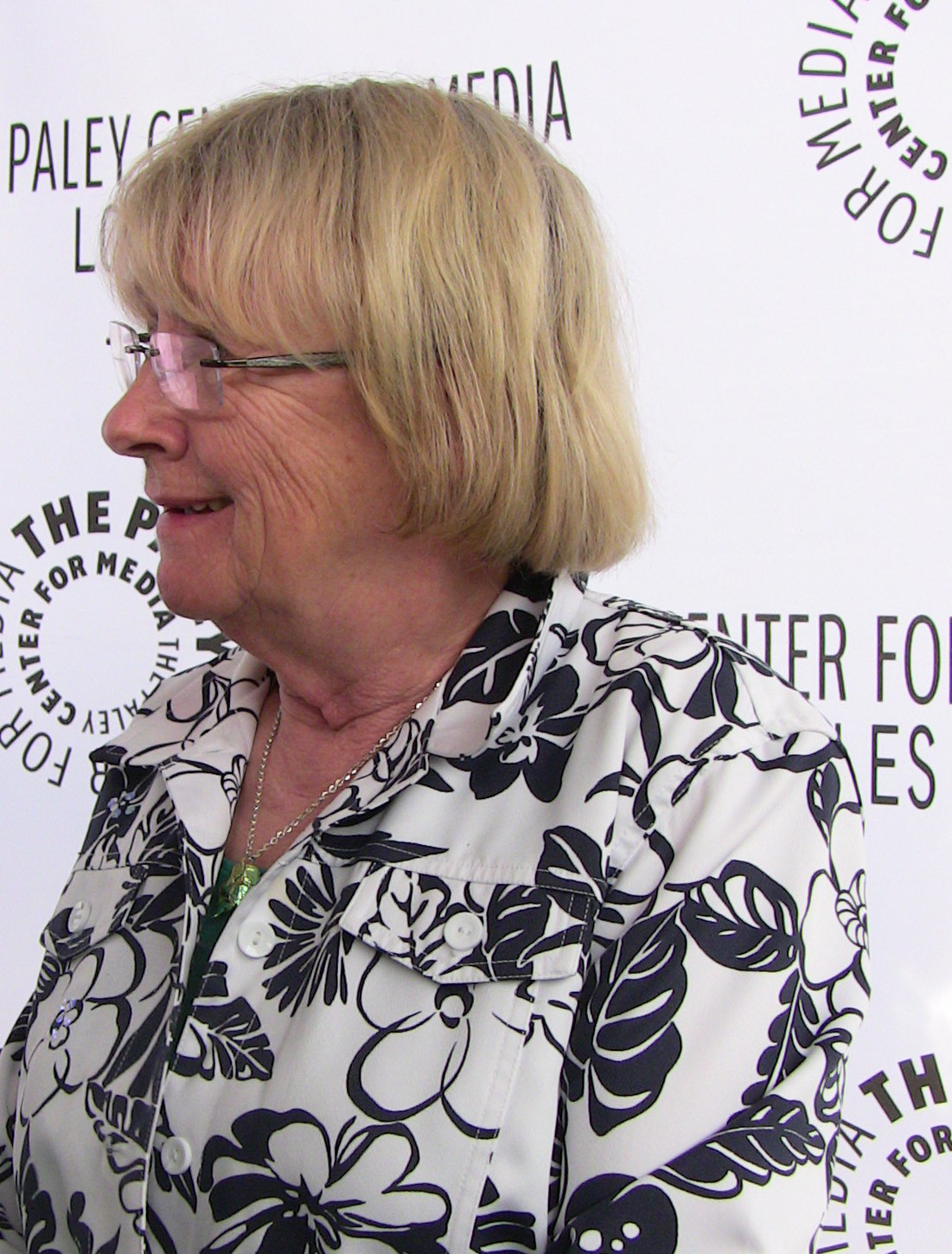
Kathryn Joosten won for twice for Desperate Housewives in 2005 and 2008.

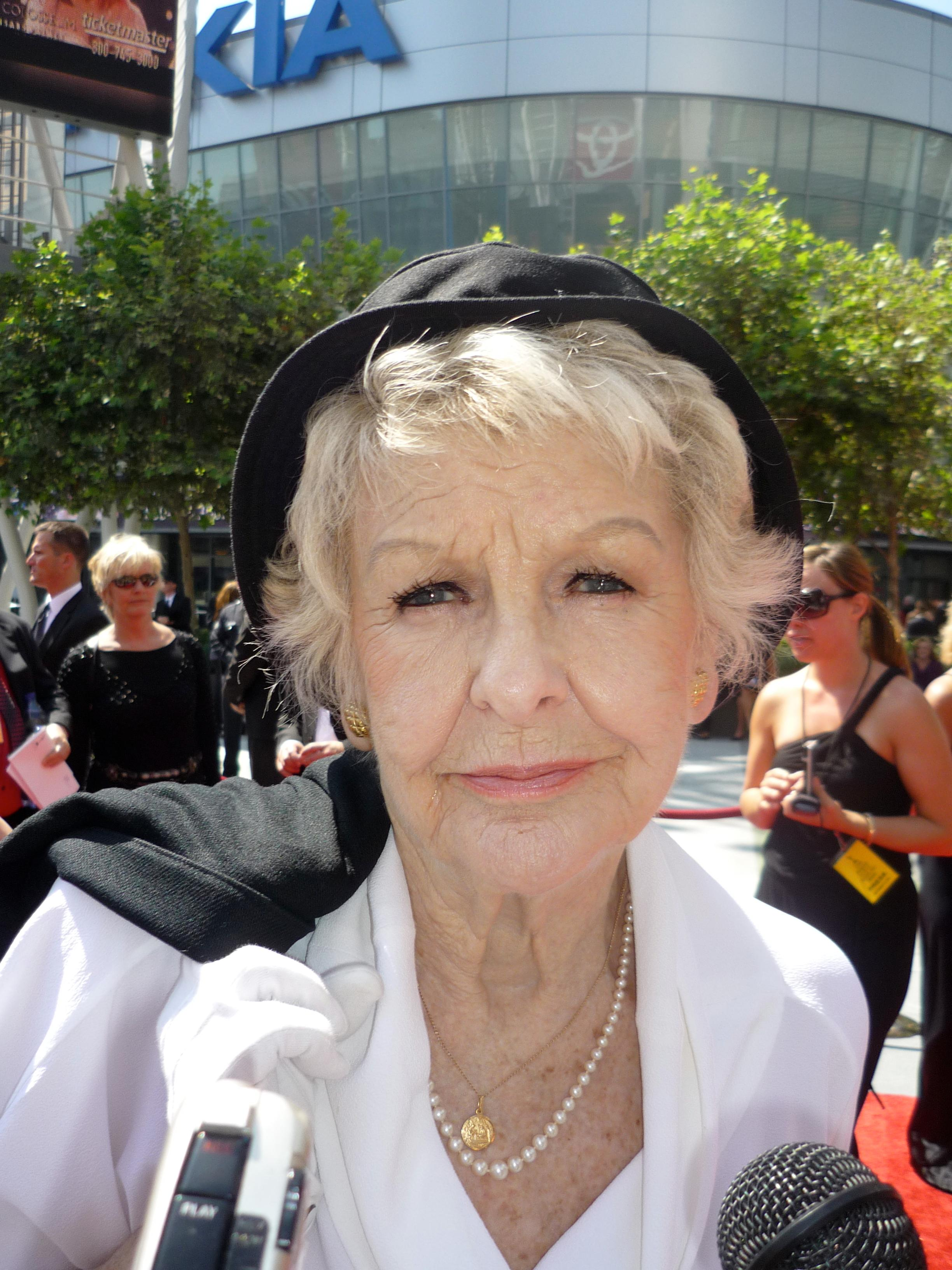
Elaine Stritch won for 30 Rock (2007).

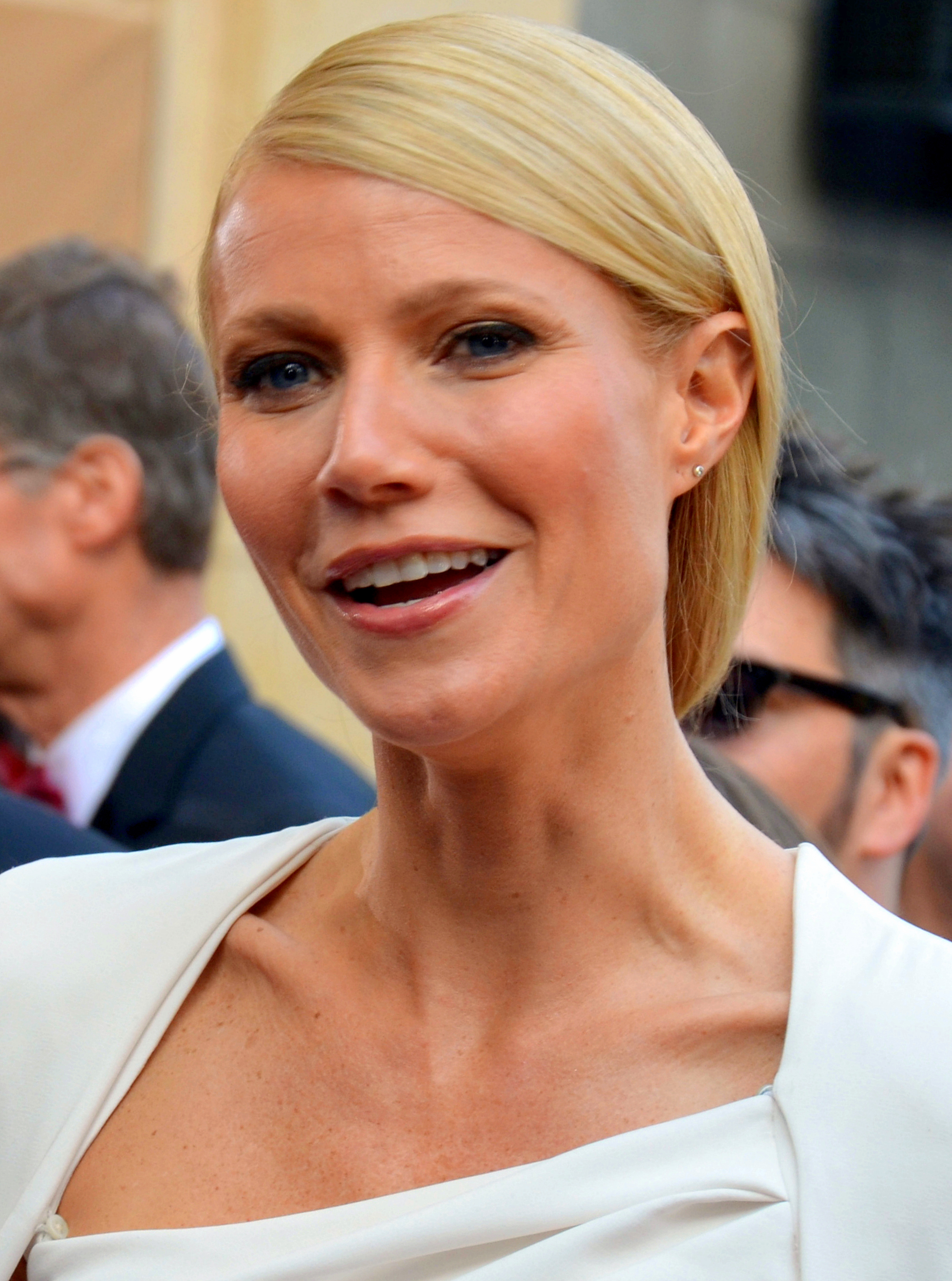
Gwyneth Paltrow won for Glee (2011).

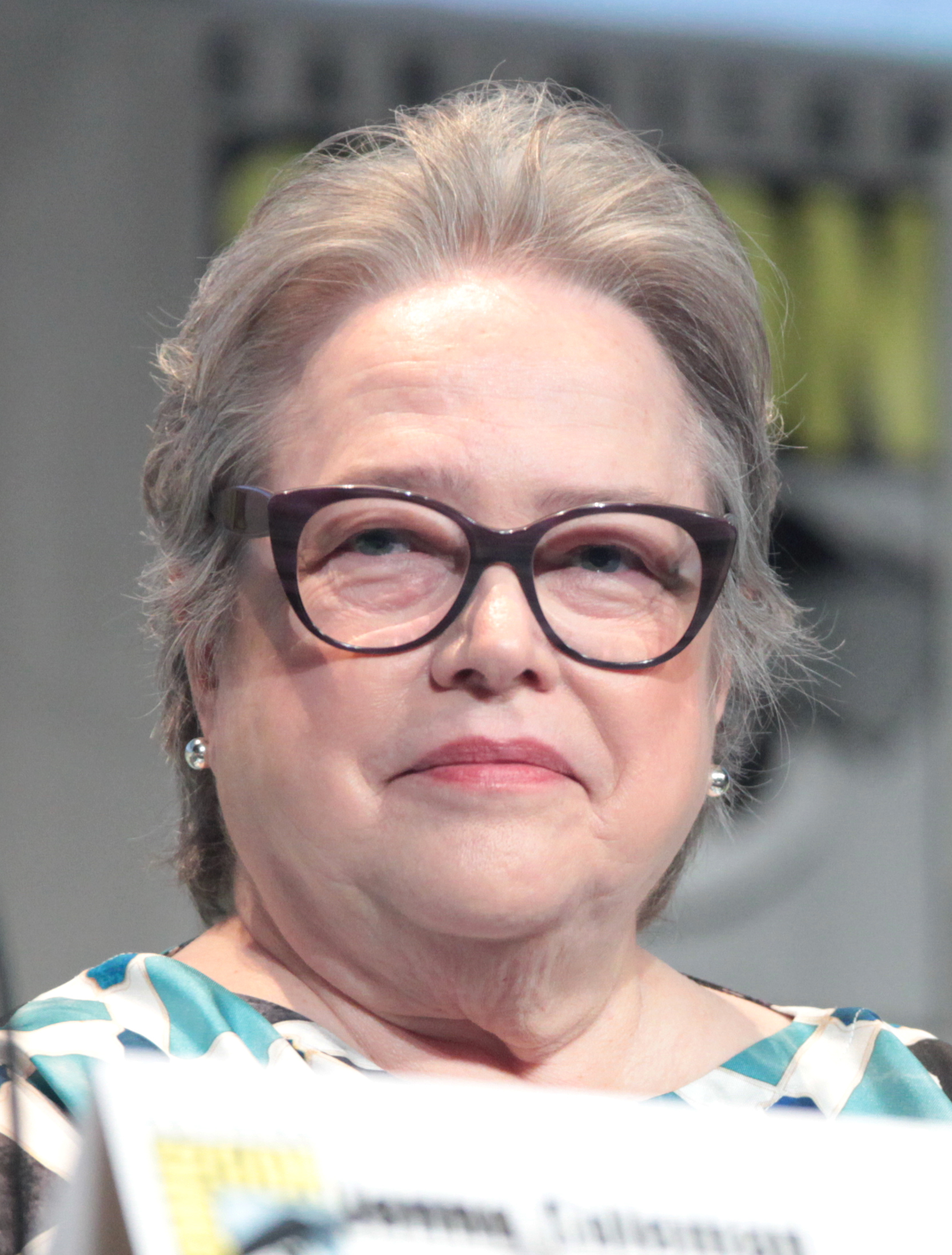
Kathy Bates won for Two and a Half Men (2012).

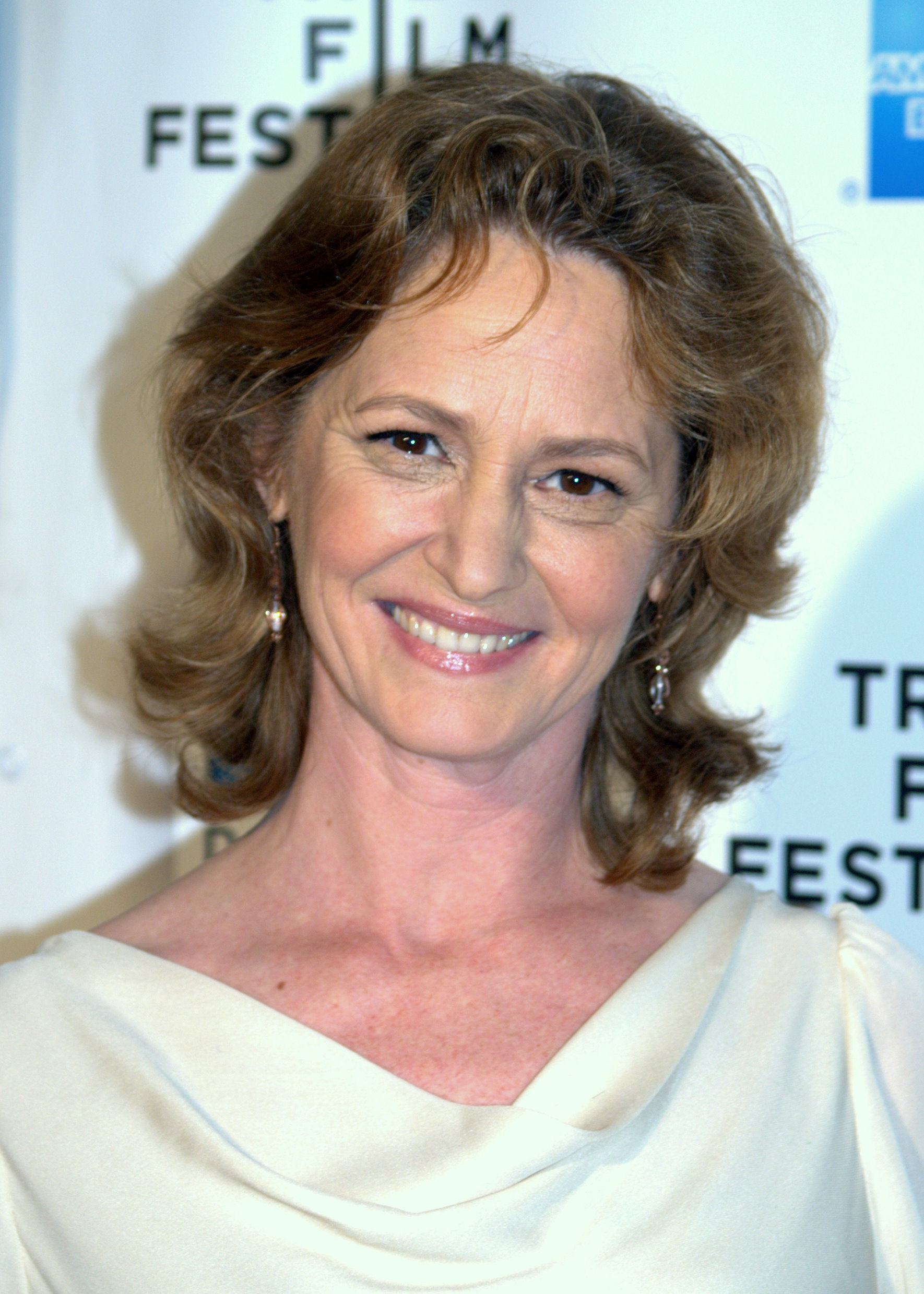
Melissa Leo won for Louie (2013).

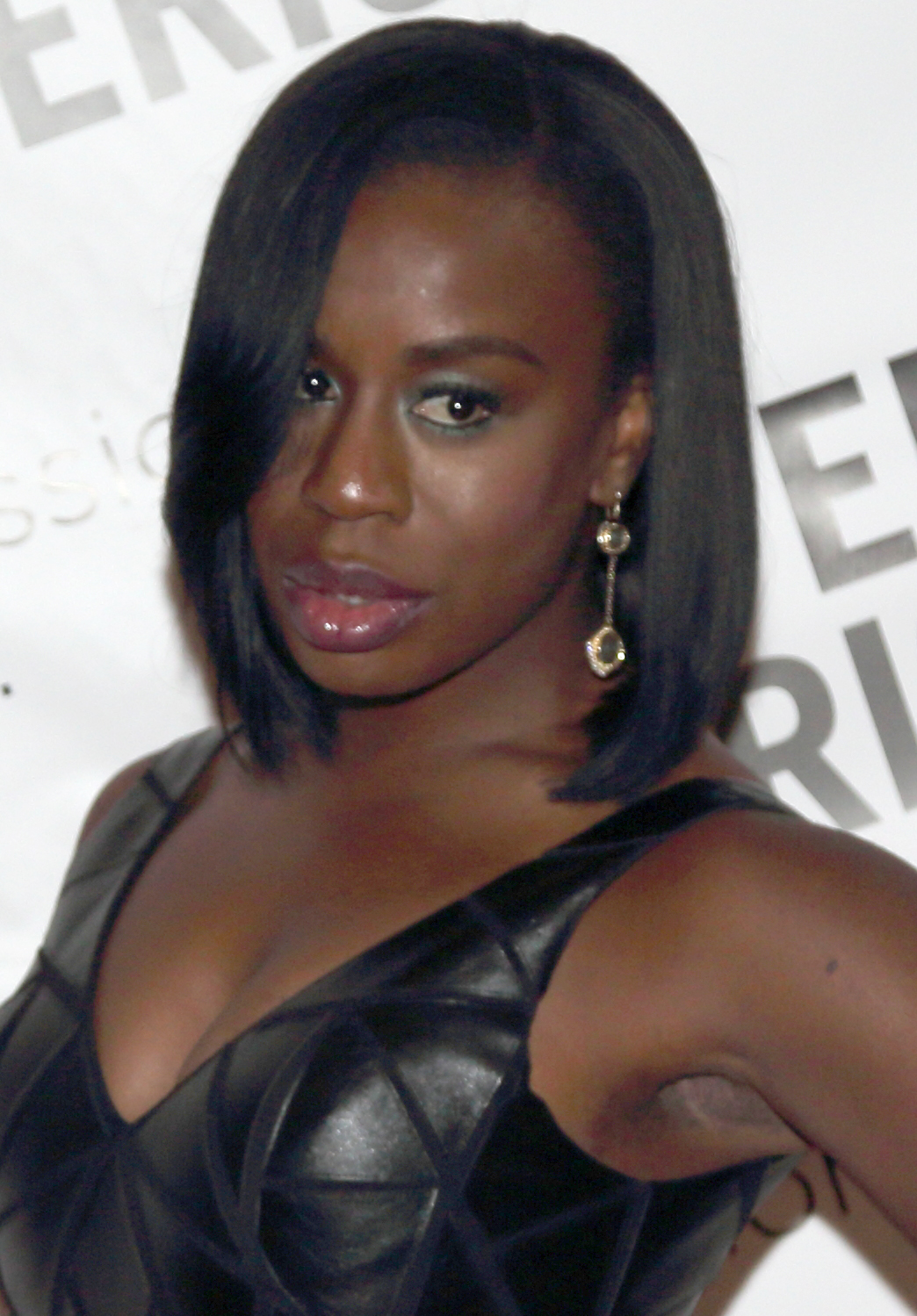
Uzo Aduba won for Orange is the New Black (2014).

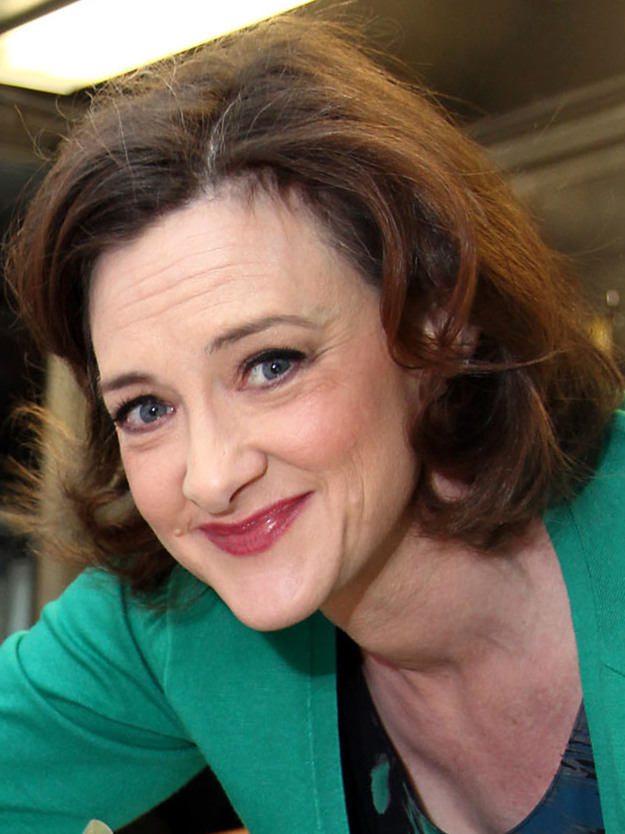
Joan Cusack won for Shameless (2015).

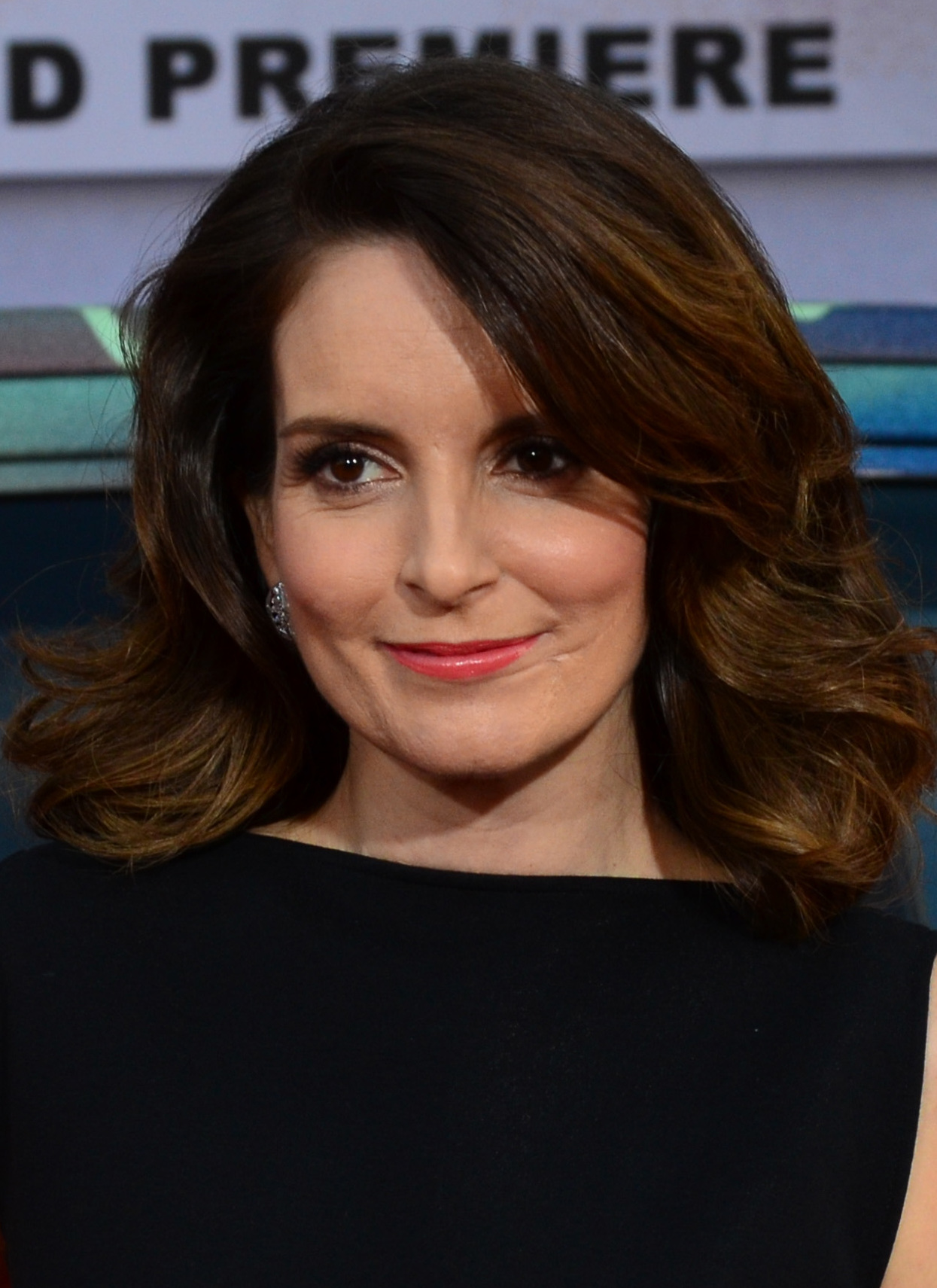
Tina Fey won twice for Saturday Night Live in 2008 and 2016.

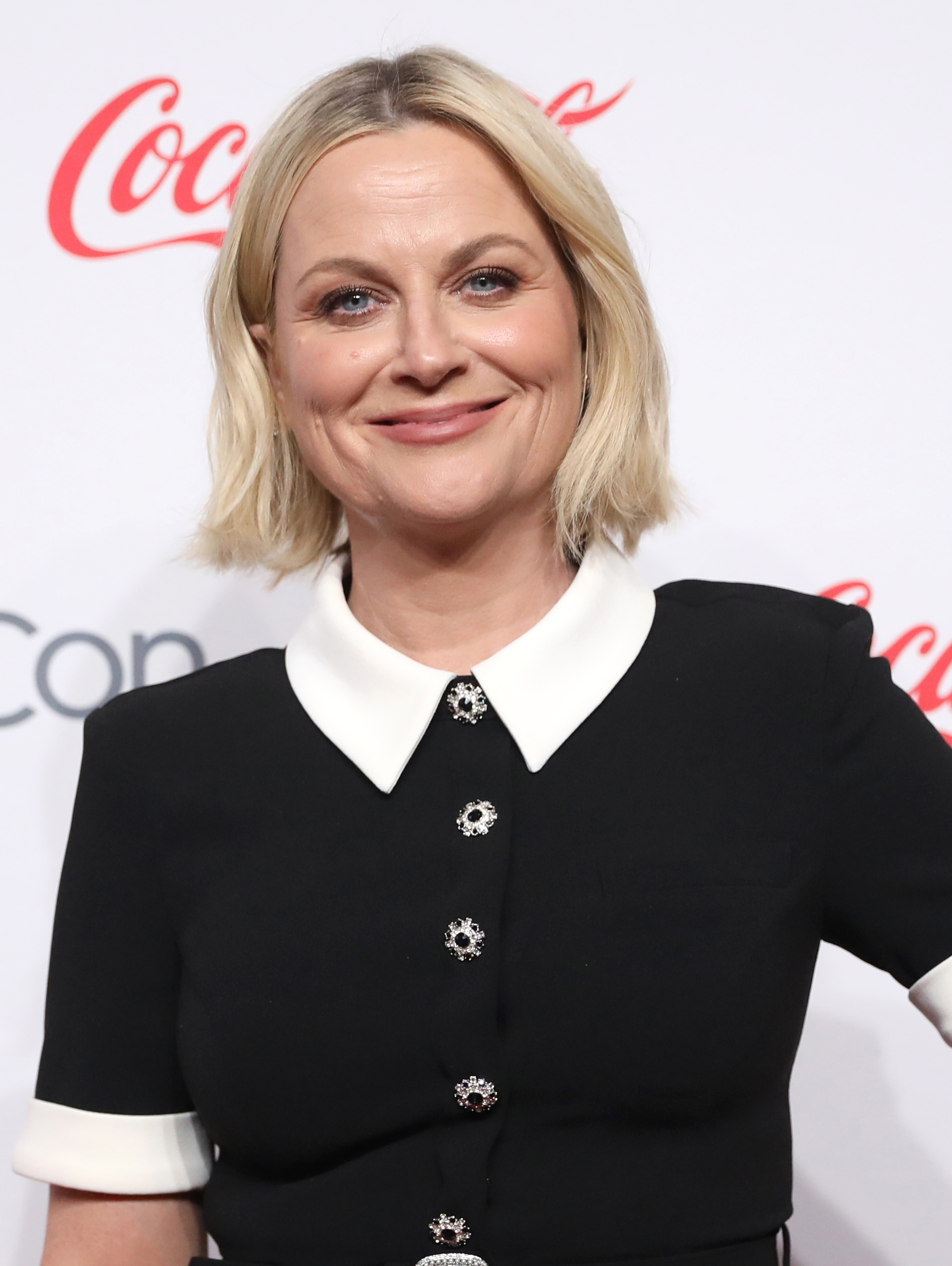
Amy Poehler won for Saturday Night Live (2016).

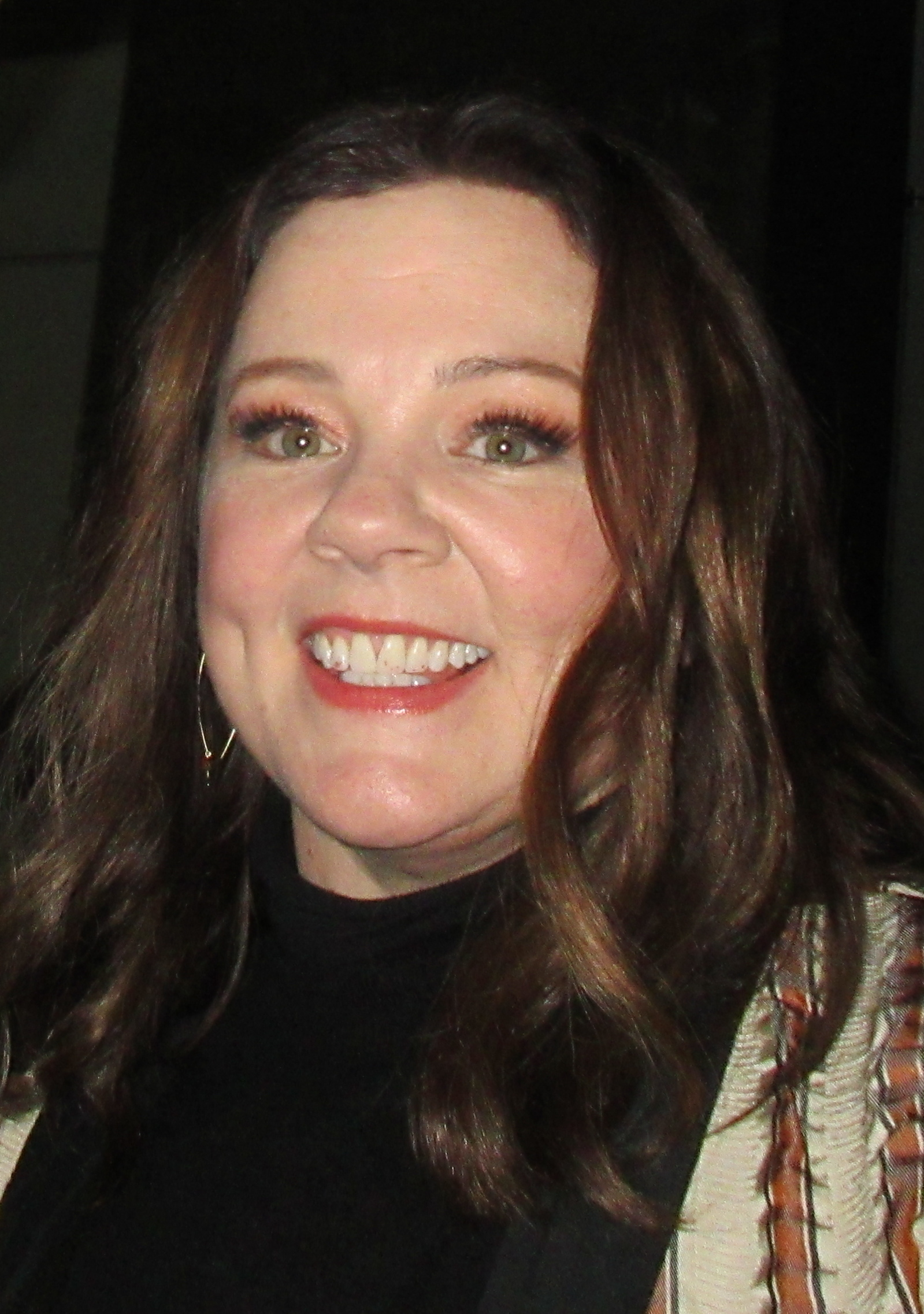
Melissa McCarthy won for Saturday Night Live (2017).

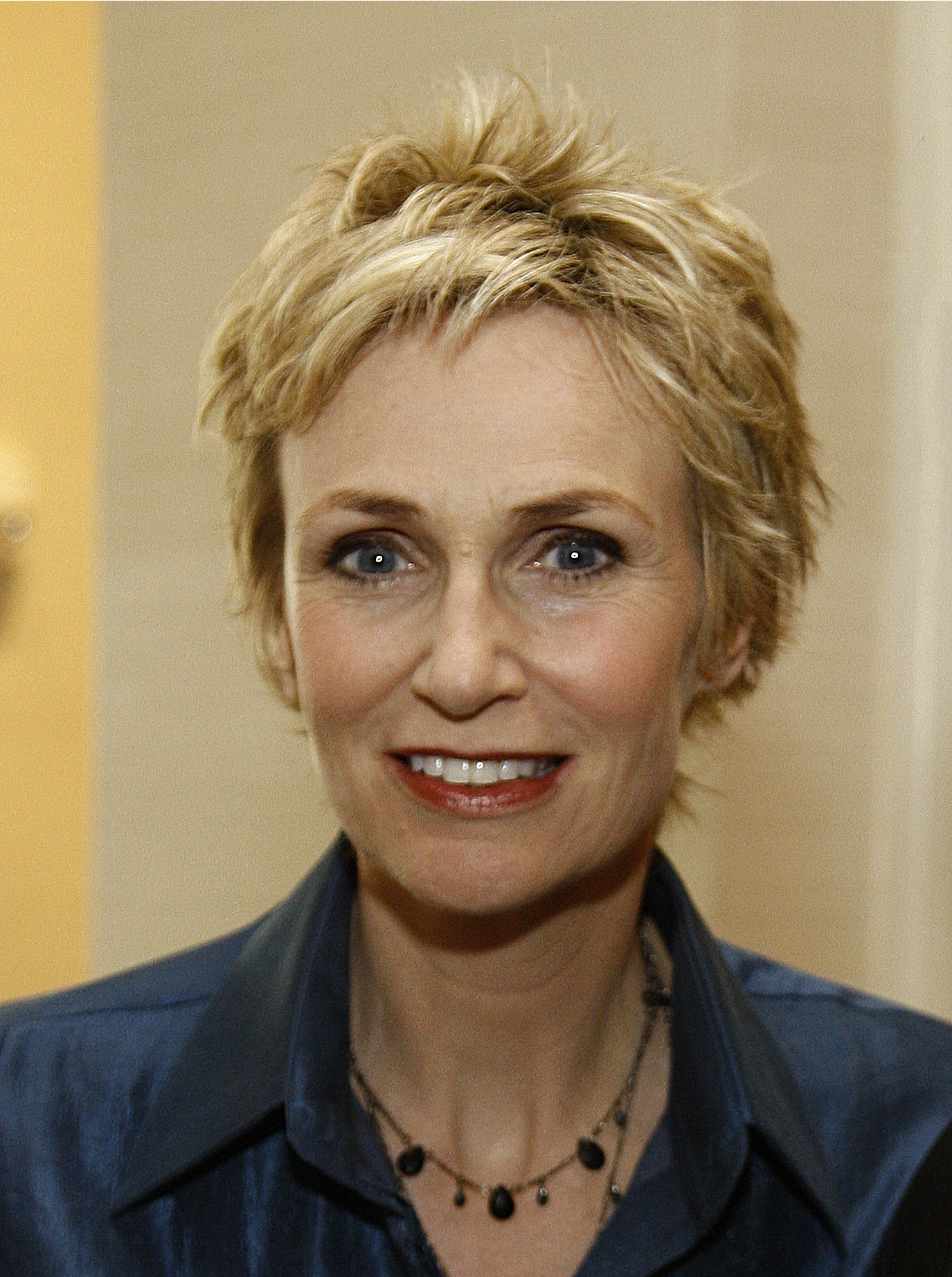
Jane Lynch won for The Marvelous Mrs. Maisel (2018).

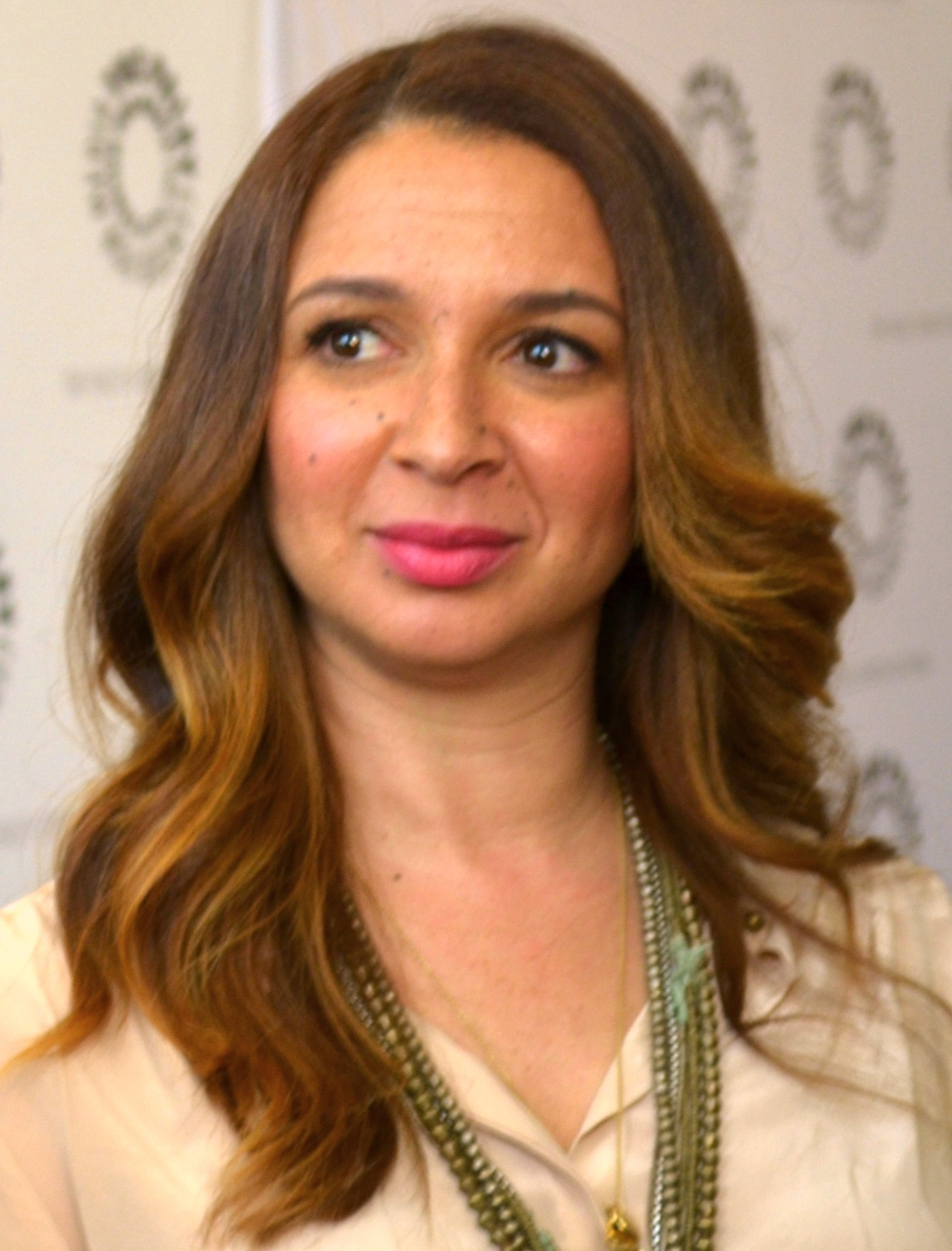
Maya Rudolph won twice consecutively for Saturday Night Live (2019–20).

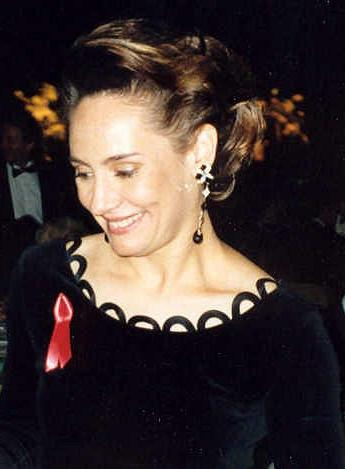
Laurie Metcalf won for Hacks (2021)

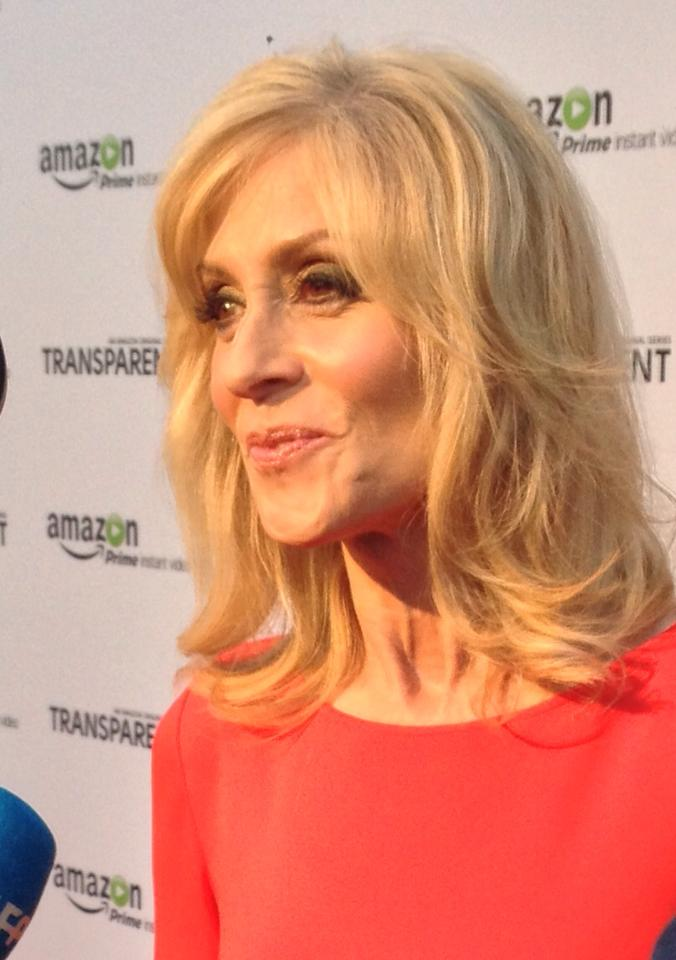
Judith Light won for Poker Face (2022)

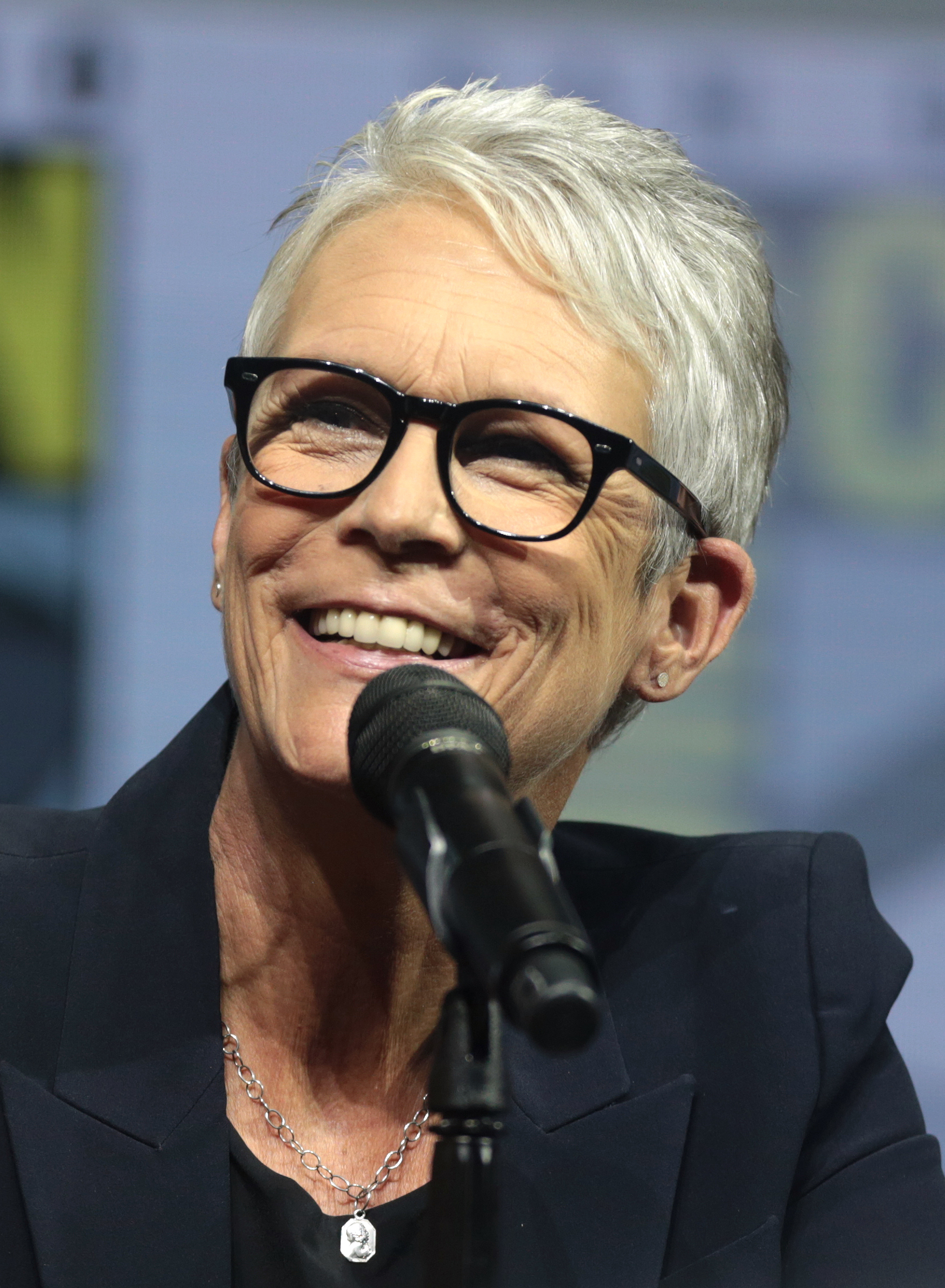
Jamie Lee Curtis for The Bear (2023)

=== 1970s ===
Year	Actress	Program	Role	Submitted episode(s)	Network
Outstanding Single Performance by a Supporting Actress in a Comedy or Drama Series
1975 (27th)
1975 (27th)	Zohra Lampert	Kojak	Marina Sheldon	"Queen of the Gypsies"	CBS
1975 (27th)	Cloris Leachman	The Mary Tyler Moore Show	Phyllis Lindstrom	"Phyllis Whips Inflation"	CBS
1975 (27th)	Shelley Winters	McCloud	Thelma	"The Barefoot Girls of Bleaker Street"	NBC
1976 (28th)
1976 (28th)	Outstanding Lead Actress for a Single Appearance in a Comedy or Drama Series				
1976 (28th)	Kathryn Walker	The Adams Chronicles	Abigail Adams	"John Adams, Lawyer"	PBS
1976 (28th)	Helen Hayes	Hawaii Five-O	Aunt Clara	"Retire In Sunny Hawaii... Forever"	CBS
1976 (28th)	Sheree North	Marcus Welby, M.D.	June Monica	"How Do You Know What Hurts Me?"	ABC
1976 (28th)	Pamela Payton-Wright	The Adams Chronicles	Louisa Catherine Adams	"John Quincy Adams, Diplomat"	PBS
1976 (28th)	Martha Raye	McMillan & Wife	Agatha	"Greed"	NBC
1976 (28th)	Outstanding Single Performance by a Supporting Actress in a Comedy or Drama Series				
1976 (28th)	Fionnula Flanagan	Rich Man, Poor Man	Clothilde	"Part II"	ABC
1976 (28th)	Ruth Gordon	Rhoda	Carlton's Mother	"Kiss Your Epaulets Goodbye"	CBS
1976 (28th)	Eileen Heckart	The Mary Tyler Moore Show	Flo Meredith	"Mary's Aunt"	CBS
1976 (28th)	Kim Darby	Rich Man, Poor Man	Virginia Calderwood	"Part II"	ABC
1976 (28th)	Kay Lenz	Rich Man, Poor Man	Kate Jordache	"Part VIII"	ABC
1977 (29th)
1977 (29th)	Outstanding Lead Actress for a Single Appearance in a Comedy or Drama Series				
1977 (29th)	Beulah Bondi	The Waltons	Aunt Martha Corinne Walton	"The Pony Cart"	CBS
1977 (29th)	Susan Blakely	Rich Man, Poor Man Book II	Julie Prescott	"Chapter 1"	ABC
1977 (29th)	Madge Sinclair	Roots	Bell Reynolds	"Part IV"	ABC
1977 (29th)	Leslie Uggams	Roots	Kizzy Reynolds	"Part VI"	ABC
1977 (29th)	Jessica Walter	The Streets of San Francisco	Maggie Jarris / Mrs. Reston / Mrs. McCluskey	"Till Death Do Us Part"	ABC
1977 (29th)	Outstanding Single Performance by a Supporting Actress in a Comedy or Drama Series				
1977 (29th)	Olivia Cole	Roots	Mathilda	"Part VIII"	ABC
1977 (29th)	Eileen Heckart	The Mary Tyler Moore Show	Flo Meredith	"Lou Proposes"	CBS
1977 (29th)	Sandy Duncan	Roots	Missy Anne Reynolds	"Part V"	ABC
1977 (29th)	Cicely Tyson	Roots	Binta	"Part I"	ABC
1977 (29th)	Nancy Walker	Rhoda	Ida Morgenstern	"The Separation"	CBS
1978 (30th)
1978 (30th)	Outstanding Lead Actress for a Single Appearance in a Comedy or Drama Series				
1978 (30th)	Rita Moreno	The Rockford Files	Rita Capkovic	"The Paper Palace"	NBC
1978 (30th)	Patty Duke	Having Babies III	Leslee Wexler	—N/a	ABC
1978 (30th)	Kate Jackson	James at 15	Robin	"Pilot"	NBC
1978 (30th)	Irene Tedrow	James at 15	Miss Jordan	"Ducks"	NBC
1978 (30th)	Jayne Meadows	Meeting of Minds	Florence Nightingale	"Luther, Voltaire, Plato, Nightingale"	PBS
1978 (30th)	Outstanding Single Performance by a Supporting Actress in a Comedy or Drama Series				
1978 (30th)	Blanche Baker	Holocaust	Anna Weiss	"Part I"	NBC
1978 (30th)	Ellen Corby	The Waltons	Esther Walton	"Grandma Comes Home"	CBS
1978 (30th)	Jeanette Nolan	The Awakening Land	Granny McWhirter	"Part I"	NBC
1978 (30th)	Beulah Quo	Meeting of Minds	Empress Tz'u-hsi	"Douglass, Tz'u-Hsi, Beccaria, De Sade"	PBS
1978 (30th)	Beatrice Straight	The Dain Curse	Alice Dain Leggett	"Part 1"	CBS

=== 1980s ===
Year	Actor/Actress	Program	Role	Episode	Network
Outstanding Guest Performer in a Comedy Series
1986 (38th)
1986 (38th)	Roscoe Lee Browne	The Cosby Show	Dr. Barnabus Foster	"The Card Game"	NBC
1986 (38th)	Earle Hyman	The Cosby Show	Russell Huxtable	"Happy Anniversary"	NBC
1986 (38th)	Danny Kaye	The Cosby Show	Dr. Burns	"The Dentist"	NBC
1986 (38th)	Clarice Taylor	The Cosby Show	Anna Huxtable	"Happy Anniversary"	NBC
1986 (38th)	Stevie Wonder	The Cosby Show	Himself	"A Touch of Wonder"	NBC
1987 (39th)
1987 (39th)	John Cleese	Cheers	Dr. Simon Finch-Royce	"Simon Says"	NBC
1987 (39th)	Art Carney	The Cavanaughs	James "Weasel" Cavanaugh	"He Ain't Heavy, Father..."	CBS
1987 (39th)	Herb Edelman	The Golden Girls	Stanley Zbornak	"The Stan Who Came to Dinner"	NBC
1987 (39th)	Lois Nettleton	The Golden Girls	Jean	"Isn't It Romantic?"	NBC
1987 (39th)	Nancy Walker	The Golden Girls	Angela	"Long Day's Journey into Marinara"	NBC
1988 (40th)
1988 (40th)	Beah Richards	Frank's Place	Mrs. Varden	"The Bridge"	CBS
1988 (40th)	Herb Edelman	The Golden Girls	Stanley Zbornak	"The Audit"	NBC
1988 (40th)	Geraldine Fitzgerald	The Golden Girls	Anna	"Mother's Day"	NBC
1988 (40th)	Eileen Heckart	The Cosby Show	Mrs. Hickson	"Autumn Gifts"	NBC
1988 (40th)	Gilda Radner	It's Garry Shandling's Show	Herself	"Mr. Smith Goes to Nam"	Showtime
Outstanding Guest Actress in a Comedy Series
1989 (41st)
1989 (41st)	Colleen Dewhurst	Murphy Brown	Avery Brown	"Mama Said"	CBS
1989 (41st)	Eileen Brennan	Newhart	Corine Denby		CBS
1989 (41st)	Diahann Carroll	A Different World	Marion Gilbert		NBC
1989 (41st)	Doris Roberts	Perfect Strangers	Mrs. Bailey		ABC
1989 (41st)	Maxine Stuart	The Wonder Years	Mrs. Carples		ABC

=== 1990s ===
Year	Actress	Program	Role	Network
1990 (42nd)
1990 (42nd)	Swoosie Kurtz	Carol & Company	Laurie	NBC
1990 (42nd)	Morgan Fairchild	Murphy Brown	Julia St. Martin	CBS
1990 (42nd)	Georgia Brown	Cheers	Madame Lazora	NBC
1990 (42nd)	Alexis Smith	Cheers	Alice Anne Volkman	NBC
1990 (42nd)	Liz Torres	The Famous Teddy Z	Angie	CBS
1991 (43rd)
1991 (43rd)	Colleen Dewhurst	Murphy Brown	Avery Brown	CBS
1991 (43rd)	Whoopi Goldberg	A Different World	Professor Jordan	NBC
1991 (43rd)	Frances Sternhagen	Cheers	Esther Clavin	NBC
1991 (43rd)	Sada Thompson	Cheers	Mama Lozupone	NBC
1991 (43rd)	Brenda Vaccaro	The Golden Girls	Angela Petrillo	NBC
1992 (44th)	Tyne Daly (Note: Tyne Daly was nominated in the category of Outstanding Lead Actress in a Comedy Series for her guest appearance on Wings, but lost to Candice Bergen, who won for Murphy Brown.)	Wings	Mimsy Borogroves	NBC
1992 (44th)	Frances Sternhagen (Note: Frances Sternhagen was nominated in the category of Outstanding Supporting Actress in a Comedy Series for her guest appearance on Cheers, but lost to Laurie Metcalf, who won for her role on Roseanne.)	Cheers	Esther Clavin	NBC
1993 (45th)
1993 (45th)	Tracey Ullman	Love & War	Dava Levine	CBS
1993 (45th)	Carol Burnett	The Larry Sanders Show	Herself	HBO
1993 (45th)	Ruby Dee	Evening Shade	Aurelia Danforth	CBS
1993 (45th)	Shelley Long	Cheers	Diane Chambers	NBC
1993 (45th)	Gwen Verdon	Dream On	Kitty	HBO
1994 (46th)
1994 (46th)	Eileen Heckart	Love & War	Rose Stein	CBS
1994 (46th)	Diane Ladd	Grace Under Fire	Louise Burdett	ABC
1994 (46th)	Cyndi Lauper	Mad About You	Marianne Lugasso	NBC
1994 (46th)	Marlee Matlin	Seinfeld	Laura	NBC
1994 (46th)	Marcia Wallace	Murphy Brown	Secretary 66	CBS
1995 (47th)
1995 (47th)	Cyndi Lauper	Mad About You	Marianne Lugasso	NBC
1995 (47th)	Bebe Neuwirth	Frasier	Dr. Lilith Sternin	NBC
1995 (47th)	JoBeth Williams	Frasier	Madeline	NBC
1995 (47th)	Christina Pickles	Friends	Judy Geller	NBC
1995 (47th)	Jean Stapleton	Grace Under Fire	Aunt Vivian	ABC
1996 (48th)
1996 (48th)	Betty White	The John Larroquette Show	Herself	NBC
1996 (48th)	Shelley Long	Frasier	Diane Chambers	NBC
1996 (48th)	Rosie O'Donnell	The Larry Sanders Show	Herself	HBO
1996 (48th)	Marlo Thomas	Friends	Sandra Green	NBC
1996 (48th)	Irene Worth	Remember WENN	Mrs. Mellon	AMC
1997 (49th)
1997 (49th)	Carol Burnett	Mad About You	Theresa Stemple	NBC
1997 (49th)	Ellen DeGeneres	The Larry Sanders Show	Herself	HBO
1997 (49th)	Laura Dern	Ellen	Susan Richmond	ABC
1997 (49th)	Marsha Mason	Frasier	Sherry	NBC
1997 (49th)	Betty White	Suddenly Susan	Midge Haber	NBC
1998 (50th)
1998 (50th)	Emma Thompson	Ellen	Herself	ABC
1998 (50th)	Carol Burnett	Mad About You	Theresa Stemple	NBC
1998 (50th)	Jan Hooks	3rd Rock from the Sun	Vicki Dubcek	NBC
1998 (50th)	Patti LuPone	Frasier	Zora	NBC
1998 (50th)	Bette Midler	Murphy Brown	Caprice Feldman	CBS
1999 (51st)
1999 (51st)	Tracey Ullman	Ally McBeal	Tracy Clark	Fox
1999 (51st)	Christine Baranski	Frasier	Dr. Nora Fairchild	NBC
1999 (51st)	Piper Laurie	Frasier	Mrs. Mulhern	NBC
1999 (51st)	Kathy Bates	3rd Rock from the Sun	Charlotte Everly	NBC
1999 (51st)	Laurie Metcalf	3rd Rock from the Sun	Jennifer	NBC

=== 2000s ===
Year	Actor/Actress	Program	Role	Network
2000 (52nd)
2000 (52nd)	Jean Smart	Frasier	Lorna Lynley	NBC
2000 (52nd)	Bea Arthur	Malcolm in the Middle	Mrs. White	Fox
2000 (52nd)	Cheri Oteri	Just Shoot Me!	Cindy Monroe	NBC
2000 (52nd)	Debbie Reynolds	Will & Grace	Bobbi Adler	NBC
2000 (52nd)	Holland Taylor	The Lot	Letitia DeVine	AMC
2001 (53rd)
2001 (53rd)	Jean Smart	Frasier	Lana Gardner	NBC
2001 (53rd)	Jami Gertz	Ally McBeal	Kimmy Bishop	Fox
2001 (53rd)	Cloris Leachman	Malcolm in the Middle	Grandma Ida	Fox
2001 (53rd)	Bernadette Peters	Ally McBeal	Cassandra Lewis	Fox
2001 (53rd)	Susan Sarandon	Friends	Cecilia Monroe	NBC
2002 (54th)
2002 (54th)	Cloris Leachman	Malcolm in the Middle	Grandma Ida	Fox
2002 (54th)	Glenn Close	Will & Grace	Fannie Lieber	NBC
2002 (54th)	Katherine Helmond	Everybody Loves Raymond	Lois Paymer	CBS
2002 (54th)	Susan Sarandon	Malcolm in the Middle	Meg Burbank	Fox
2002 (54th)	Frances Sternhagen	Sex and the City	Bunny MacDougal	HBO
2003 (55th)
2003 (55th)	Christina Applegate	Friends	Amy Green	NBC
2003 (55th)	Georgia Engel	Everybody Loves Raymond	Pat MacDougall	CBS
2003 (55th)	Betty Garrett	Becker	Molly Firth	CBS
2003 (55th)	Cloris Leachman	Malcolm in the Middle	Grandma Ida	Fox
2003 (55th)	Betty White	Yes, Dear	Sylvia Weston	CBS
2004 (56th)
2004 (56th)	Laura Linney	Frasier	Charlotte Novak	NBC
2004 (56th)	Christina Applegate	Friends	Amy Green	NBC
2004 (56th)	Eileen Brennan	Will & Grace	Zandra Zoggin	NBC
2004 (56th)	Georgia Engel	Everybody Loves Raymond	Pat MacDougall	CBS
2004 (56th)	Cloris Leachman	Malcolm in the Middle	Grandma Ida	Fox
2005 (57th)
2005 (57th)	Kathryn Joosten	Desperate Housewives	Karen McCluskey	ABC
2005 (57th)	Blythe Danner	Will & Grace	Marilyn Truman	NBC
2005 (57th)	Georgia Engel	Everybody Loves Raymond	Pat MacDougall	CBS
2005 (57th)	Cloris Leachman	Malcolm in the Middle	Grandma Ida	Fox
2005 (57th)	Lupe Ontiveros	Desperate Housewives	Juanita Solis	ABC
2006 (58th)
2006 (58th)	Cloris Leachman	Malcolm in the Middle	Grandma Ida	Fox
2006 (58th)	Blythe Danner	Will & Grace	Marilyn Truman	NBC
2006 (58th)	Shirley Knight	Desperate Housewives	Phyllis Van De Kamp	ABC
2006 (58th)	Laurie Metcalf	Monk	Cora Cross	USA
2006 (58th)	Kate Winslet	Extras	Herself	HBO
2007 (59th)
2007 (59th)	Elaine Stritch	30 Rock	Colleen Donaghy	NBC
2007 (59th)	Dixie Carter	Desperate Housewives	Gloria Hodge	ABC
2007 (59th)	Salma Hayek	Ugly Betty	Sofia Reyes	ABC
2007 (59th)	Judith Light	Ugly Betty	Claire Meade	ABC
2007 (59th)	Laurie Metcalf	Desperate Housewives	Carolyn Bigsby	ABC
2008 (60th)
2008 (60th)	Kathryn Joosten	Desperate Housewives	Karen McCluskey	ABC
2008 (60th)	Polly Bergen	Desperate Housewives	Stella Wingfield	ABC
2008 (60th)	Edie Falco	30 Rock	Celeste "C. C." Cunningham	NBC
2008 (60th)	Carrie Fisher	30 Rock	Rosemary Howard	NBC
2008 (60th)	Sarah Silverman	Monk	Marci Maven	USA
2008 (60th)	Elaine Stritch	30 Rock	Colleen Donaghy	NBC
2009 (61st)
2009 (61st)	Tina Fey	Saturday Night Live	Sarah Palin	NBC
2009 (61st)	Jennifer Aniston	30 Rock	Claire Harper	NBC
2009 (61st)	Christine Baranski	The Big Bang Theory	Dr. Beverly Hofstadter	CBS
2009 (61st)	Gena Rowlands	Monk	Marge Nassell	USA
2009 (61st)	Elaine Stritch	30 Rock	Colleen Donaghy	NBC
2009 (61st)	Betty White	My Name Is Earl	Grizelda Weezmer ("Crazy Witch Lady")	NBC

=== 2010s ===
Year	Actress	Program	Role	Episode	Network
2010 (62nd)
2010 (62nd)	Betty White	Saturday Night Live	Various Characters	"Host: Betty White"	NBC
2010 (62nd)	Christine Baranski	The Big Bang Theory	Dr. Beverly Hofstadter	"The Maternal Congruence"	CBS
2010 (62nd)	Kristin Chenoweth	Glee	April Rhodes	"The Rhodes Not Taken"	Fox
2010 (62nd)	Tina Fey	Saturday Night Live	Various Characters	"Host: Tina Fey"	NBC
2010 (62nd)	Kathryn Joosten	Desperate Housewives	Karen McCluskey	"The Chase"	ABC
2010 (62nd)	Jane Lynch	Two and a Half Men	Dr. Linda Freeman	"818-jklpuzo"	CBS
2010 (62nd)	Elaine Stritch	30 Rock	Colleen Donaghy	"The Moms"	NBC
2011 (63rd)
2011 (63rd)	Gwyneth Paltrow	Glee	Holly Holliday	"The Substitute"	Fox
2011 (63rd)	Elizabeth Banks	30 Rock	Avery Jessup-Donaghy	"Double-Edged Sword"	NBC
2011 (63rd)	Kristin Chenoweth	Glee	April Rhodes	"Rumours"	Fox
2011 (63rd)	Dot-Marie Jones	Glee	Coach Beiste	"Never Been Kissed"	Fox
2011 (63rd)	Cloris Leachman	Raising Hope	Barbara "Maw Maw" Thompson	"Don't Vote for This Episode"	Fox
2011 (63rd)	Tina Fey	Saturday Night Live	Various Characters	"Host: Tina Fey"	NBC
2012 (64th)
2012 (64th)	Kathy Bates	Two and a Half Men	The Ghost of Charlie Harper	"Why We Gave Up Women"	CBS
2012 (64th)	Elizabeth Banks	30 Rock	Avery Jessup-Donaghy	"The Return of Avery Jessup"	NBC
2012 (64th)	Margaret Cho	30 Rock	Kim Jong-il	"The Return of Avery Jessup"	NBC
2012 (64th)	Dot-Marie Jones	Glee	Coach Beiste	"Choke"	Fox
2012 (64th)	Melissa McCarthy	Saturday Night Live	Various Characters	"Host: Melissa McCarthy"	NBC
2012 (64th)	Maya Rudolph	Saturday Night Live	Various Characters	"Host: Maya Rudolph"	NBC
2013 (65th)
2013 (65th)	Melissa Leo	Louie	Laurie Burke	"Telling Jokes/Set Up"	FX
2013 (65th)	Dot-Marie Jones	Glee	Coach Beiste	"Shooting Star"	Fox
2013 (65th)	Melissa McCarthy	Saturday Night Live	Various Characters	"Host: Melissa McCarthy"	NBC
2013 (65th)	Molly Shannon	Enlightened	Eileen Foliente	"The Ghost Is Seen"	HBO
2013 (65th)	Elaine Stritch	30 Rock	Colleen Donaghy	"My Whole Life Is Thunder"	NBC
2013 (65th)	Kristen Wiig	Saturday Night Live	Various Characters	"Host: Kristen Wiig"	NBC
2014 (66th)
2014 (66th)	Uzo Aduba	Orange Is the New Black	Suzanne "Crazy Eyes" Warren	"Lesbian Request Denied"	Netflix
2014 (66th)	Laverne Cox	Orange Is the New Black	Sophia Burset	"Lesbian Request Denied"	Netflix
2014 (66th)	Joan Cusack	Shameless	Sheila Jackson	"Liver, I Hardly Know Her"	Showtime
2014 (66th)	Tina Fey	Saturday Night Live	Various Characters	"Host: Tina Fey"	NBC
2014 (66th)	Natasha Lyonne	Orange Is the New Black	Nicole "Nicky" Nichols	"WAC Pack"	Netflix
2014 (66th)	Melissa McCarthy	Saturday Night Live	Various Characters	"Host: Melissa McCarthy"	NBC
2015 (67th)
2015 (67th)	Joan Cusack	Shameless	Sheila Jackson	"Milk of the Gods"	Showtime
2015 (67th)	Pamela Adlon	Louie	Pamela	"Bobby's House"	FX
2015 (67th)	Elizabeth Banks	Modern Family	Sal	"Fight or Flight"	ABC
2015 (67th)	Christine Baranski	The Big Bang Theory	Dr. Beverly Hofstadter	"The Maternal Combustion"	CBS
2015 (67th)	Tina Fey	Unbreakable Kimmy Schmidt	Marcia	"Kimmy Goes to Court!"	Netflix
2015 (67th)	Gaby Hoffmann	Girls	Caroline Sackler	"Home Birth"	HBO
2016 (68th)
2016 (68th)	Tina Fey & Amy Poehler	Saturday Night Live	Various Characters	"Host: Tina Fey & Amy Poehler"	NBC
2016 (68th)	Christine Baranski	The Big Bang Theory	Dr. Beverly Hofstadter	"The Convergence Convergence"	CBS
2016 (68th)	Melora Hardin	Transparent	Tammy Cashman	"Flicky-Flicky Thump-Thump"	Amazon
2016 (68th)	Laurie Metcalf	The Big Bang Theory	Mary Cooper	"The Convergence Convergence"	CBS
2016 (68th)	Melissa McCarthy	Saturday Night Live	Various Characters	"Host: Melissa McCarthy"	NBC
2016 (68th)	Amy Schumer	Saturday Night Live	Various Characters	"Host: Amy Schumer"	NBC
2017 (69th)
2017 (69th)	Melissa McCarthy	Saturday Night Live	Various Characters	"Host: Melissa McCarthy"	NBC
2017 (69th)	Becky Ann Baker	Girls	Loreen Horvath	"Gummies"	HBO
2017 (69th)	Angela Bassett	Master of None	Catherine	"Thanksgiving"	Netflix
2017 (69th)	Carrie Fisher (post-humously)	Catastrophe	Mia Norris	"Episode 6"	Amazon
2017 (69th)	Wanda Sykes	Black-ish	Daphne Lido	"Lemons"	ABC
2017 (69th)	Kristen Wiig	Saturday Night Live	Various Characters	"Host: Kristen Wiig"	NBC
2018 (70th)
2018 (70th)	Tiffany Haddish	Saturday Night Live	Various Characters	"Host: Tiffany Haddish"	NBC
2018 (70th)	Tina Fey	Saturday Night Live	Various Characters	"Host: Tina Fey"	NBC
2018 (70th)	Jane Lynch	The Marvelous Mrs. Maisel	Sophie Lennon	"Put That on Your Plate!"	Amazon
2018 (70th)	Maya Rudolph	The Good Place	Judge Gen	"The Burrito"	NBC
2018 (70th)	Molly Shannon	Will & Grace	Val Bassett	"There's Something About Larry"	NBC
2018 (70th)	Wanda Sykes	Black-ish	Daphne Lido	"Juneteenth"	ABC
2019 (71st)
2019 (71st)	Jane Lynch	The Marvelous Mrs. Maisel	Sophie Lennon	"Vote for Kennedy, Vote for Kennedy"	Amazon
2019 (71st)	Sandra Oh	Saturday Night Live	Various Characters	"Host: Sandra Oh"	NBC
2019 (71st)	Maya Rudolph	The Good Place	Judge Gen	"Chidi Sees the Time-Knife"	NBC
2019 (71st)	Kristin Scott Thomas	Fleabag	Belinda Friers	"Episode 3"	Amazon
2019 (71st)	Fiona Shaw	Fleabag	Counsellor	"Episode 2"	Amazon
2019 (71st)	Emma Thompson	Saturday Night Live	Various Characters	"Host: Emma Thompson	NBC

=== 2020s ===
Year	Actor	Program	Role	Episode	Network
2020 (72nd)
2020 (72nd)	Maya Rudolph	Saturday Night Live	Kamala Harris	"Host: Eddie Murphy"	NBC
2020 (72nd)	Angela Bassett	A Black Lady Sketch Show	Mo	"Angela Bassett Is the Baddest Bitch"	HBO
2020 (72nd)	Bette Midler	The Politician	Hadassah Gold	"Vienna"	Netflix
2020 (72nd)	Maya Rudolph	The Good Place	Judge Gen	"You've Changed, Man"	NBC
2020 (72nd)	Wanda Sykes	The Marvelous Mrs. Maisel	Moms Mabley	"A Jewish Girl Walks Into the Apollo…"	Amazon
2020 (72nd)	Phoebe Waller-Bridge	Saturday Night Live	Various characters	"Host: Phoebe Waller-Bridge"	NBC
2021 (73rd)
2021 (73rd)	Maya Rudolph	Saturday Night Live	Various characters	"Host: Maya Rudolph"	NBC
2021 (73rd)	Jane Adams	Hacks	Nina Daniels	"I Think She Will"	HBO Max
2021 (73rd)	Yvette Nicole Brown	A Black Lady Sketch Show	Judge Anita Harper	"But the Tilapias Are Fine Though, Right?"	HBO
2021 (73rd)	Bernadette Peters	Zoey's Extraordinary Playlist	Deb	"Zoey's Extraordinary Girls' Night"	NBC
2021 (73rd)	Issa Rae	A Black Lady Sketch Show	Jess	"My Booty Look Juicy, Don't It?"	HBO
2021 (73rd)	Kristen Wiig	Saturday Night Live	Various characters	"Host: Kristen Wiig"	NBC
2022 (74th)
2022 (74th)	Laurie Metcalf	Hacks	Weed	"Trust the Process"	HBO Max
2022 (74th)	Jane Adams	Hacks	Nina Daniels	"The Click"	HBO Max
2022 (74th)	Harriet Sansom Harris	Hacks	Susan	"Retired"	HBO Max
2022 (74th)	Jane Lynch	Only Murders in the Building	Sazz Pataki	"Double Time"	Hulu
2022 (74th)	Kaitlin Olson	Hacks	Deborah "DJ" Vance Jr.	"There Will Be Blood"	HBO Max
2022 (74th)	Harriet Walter	Ted Lasso	Deborah Welton	"The Signal"	Apple TV+
2023 (75th)
2023 (75th)	Judith Light	Poker Face	Irene Smothers	"Time of the Monkey"	Peacock
2023 (75th)	Becky Ann Baker	Ted Lasso	Dottie Lasso	"Mom City"	Apple TV+
2023 (75th)	Quinta Brunson	Saturday Night Live	Various characters	"Host: Quinta Brunson"	NBC
2023 (75th)	Taraji P. Henson	Abbott Elementary	Vanetta Teagues	"Mom"	ABC
2023 (75th)	Sarah Niles	Ted Lasso	Dr. Sharon Fieldstone	"Smells Like Mean Spirit"	Apple TV+
2023 (75th)	Harriet Walter	Ted Lasso	Deborah Welton	"So Long, Farewell"	Apple TV+
2024 (76th)
2024 (76th)	Jamie Lee Curtis	The Bear	Donna Berzatto	"Fishes"	FX
2024 (76th)	Olivia Colman	The Bear	Chef Terry	"Forks"	FX
2024 (76th)	Kaitlin Olson	Hacks	DJ Vance	"The Roast of Deborah Vance"	Max
2024 (76th)	Da'Vine Joy Randolph	Only Murders in the Building	Donna Williams	"Sitzprobe"	Hulu
2024 (76th)	Maya Rudolph	Saturday Night Live	Various characters	"Host: Maya Rudolph"	NBC
2024 (76th)	Kristen Wiig	Saturday Night Live	Various characters	"Host: Kristen Wiig"	NBC
2025 (77th)
2025 (77th)	Julianne Nicholson	Hacks	Dance Mom	"A Slippery Slope"	HBO Max
2025 (77th)	Olivia Colman	The Bear	Chef Terry	"Forever"	FX
2025 (77th)	Jamie Lee Curtis	The Bear	Donna Berzatto	"Ice Chips"	FX
2025 (77th)	Cynthia Erivo	Poker Face	Various roles (Note: In the episode Cynthia Erivo portrays numerous characters: Amber Kazinsky / Bebe Kazinsky / Cece Kazinsky / Delia Kazinsky / Felicity Price / Fauxlicity (Amber) / Fake Delia (Amber))	"The Game Is a Foot"	Peacock
2025 (77th)	Robby Hoffman	Hacks	Randi	"Cover Girls"	HBO Max
2025 (77th)	Zoë Kravitz	The Studio	Herself	"The Presentation"	Apple TV+
2026 (78th)
2026 (78th)	Betty Gilpin	Widow's Bay	Sarah Westcott Warren	"Our History"	Apple TV
2026 (78th)	Leslie Bibb	Hacks	Monica	"Montecito"	HBO Max
2026 (78th)	Jamie Lee Curtis	The Bear	Donna Berzatto	"Tonnato"	FX
2026 (78th)	Cherry Jones	Hacks	Kelly Kilpatrick	"Montecito"	HBO Max
2026 (78th)	Laurie Metcalf	Hacks	Weed	"The Garden"	HBO Max
2026 (78th)	Kaitlin Olson	Hacks	DJ Vance	"D'Amazing Race"	HBO Max
2026 (78th)	Lauren Weedman	Hacks	Jo Pezzimenti	"The Cube"	HBO Max

== Performers with multiple wins ==
3 wins

- Cloris Leachman

2 wins

- Colleen Dewhurst
- Tina Fey
- Kathryn Joosten
- Maya Rudolph (consecutive)
- Jean Smart (consecutive)
- Tracey Ullman
- Betty White

== Programs with multiple awards ==
7 awards

- Saturday Night Live (3 consecutive; 2 consecutive)

3 awards

- Frasier (2 consecutive)

2 awards

- Desperate Housewives
- Hacks
- Love & War (consecutive)
- Mad About You
- Malcolm in the Middle
- Murphy Brown

== Performers with multiple nominations ==
8 nominations

- Cloris Leachman

7 nominations

- Tina Fey
- Laurie Metcalf
- Maya Rudolph

5 nominations

- Christine Baranski
- Melissa McCarthy
- Elaine Stritch
- Betty White

4 nominations

- Eileen Heckart
- Jane Lynch
- Kristen Wiig

3 nominations

- Elizabeth Banks
- Carol Burnett
- Jamie Lee Curtis
- Georgia Engel
- Dot-Marie Jones
- Kathryn Joosten
- Kaitlin Olson
- Wanda Sykes

2 nominations

- Jane Adams
- Christina Applegate
- Becky Ann Baker
- Angela Bassett
- Kathy Bates
- Eileen Brennan
- Kristin Chenoweth
- Olivia Colman
- Joan Cusack
- Blythe Danner
- Colleen Dewhurst
- Carrie Fisher
- Cyndi Lauper
- Judith Light
- Shelley Long
- Bette Midler
- Bernadette Peters
- Susan Sarandon
- Molly Shannon
- Jean Smart
- Emma Thompson
- Tracey Ullman
- Nancy Walker
- Harriet Walter

== Programs with multiple nominations ==
26 nominations

- Saturday Night Live

13 nominations

- Hacks

11 nominations

- 30 Rock

10 nominations

- Frasier

8 nominations

- Desperate Housewives
- Malcolm in the Middle

6 nominations

- Cheers
- The Cosby Show
- Glee
- The Golden Girls
- Will & Grace

5 nominations

- The Big Bang Theory
- Friends
- Murphy Brown

4 nominations

- The Bear
- Everybody Loves Raymond
- Mad About You
- Ted Lasso

3 nominations

- Ally McBeal
- A Black Lady Sketch Show
- Black-ish
- The Good Place
- The Larry Sanders Show
- The Marvelous Mrs. Maisel
- Monk
- Orange Is the New Black
- 3rd Rock from the Sun

2 nominations

- A Different World
- Ellen
- Fleabag
- Girls
- Grace Under Fire
- Louie
- Love & War
- Only Murders in the Building
- Poker Face
- Shameless
- Two and a Half Men
- Ugly Betty
