= The Presentation (The Studio) =

- The Studio episode
- Episode no.: Season 1 Episode 10
- Directed by: Seth Rogen; Evan Goldberg
- Written by: Seth Rogen; Evan Goldberg; Peter Huyck; Alex Gregory; Frida Perez
- Cinematography by: Adam Newport-Berra
- Editing by: Eric Kissack
- Original air date: May 21, 2025
- Running time: 26 minutes

Guest appearances
- Matthew Belloni as Himself; Bryan Cranston as Griffin Mill; Dave Franco as Himself; Lisa Gilroy as Gabby; Zoë Kravitz as Herself; David Krumholtz as Mitch Weitz; Keyla Monterroso Mejia as Petra; Dewayne Perkins as Tyler; Nicholas Stoller as Himself

Episode chronology
← Previous "CinemaCon"	Next → —

"The Presentation" is the tenth episode and first-season finale of the American satirical comedy television series The Studio. The episode was written by series co-creators Seth Rogen, Evan Goldberg, Peter Huyck, Alex Gregory, Frida Perez, and directed by Rogen and Goldberg. It was released on Apple TV+ on May 21, 2025.

The series follows Matt Remick, the newly appointed head of the film production company Continental Studios. He attempts to save the floundering company in an industry undergoing rapid social and economic changes. In the episode, Matt and his staff try to get Griffin come to his senses before their incoming presentation at CinemaCon.

The episode received mostly positive reviews from critics, who praised the humor, performances and writing, although some were mixed over the episode's placement as the season finale and short runtime.

== Plot ==
Matt, Sal, Quinn and Maya find Griffin intoxicated outside The Venetian alongside Patty who recorded him with her phone, before he loses consciousness. Patty reveals she called Matthew Belloni to the scene to ruin Griffin's image, but has a change of heart when she is informed that Amazon is planning on buying Continental Studios. Taking inspiration from Weekend at Bernie's, they work to move Griffin into the hotel to prepare him.

Along the way, they evade Belloni in the hallway and get him to his room. However, Zoë Kravitz and Dave Franco are still experiencing the effects of the mushrooms, and it is clear that they will not be stable for the presentation. Desperate, Sal decides to supply Griffin with cocaine, allowing him to properly wake up. When the presentation begins, Franco and Kravitz are forced to do it in their current state; Franco's energy manages to hold off suspicions as he promotes Alphabet City. As Mitch is still unwilling to let Kravitz go on stage, Patty is forced to improvise by presenting The Silver Lake. Kravitz finally gets on stage, where she delivers a great performance by presenting Blackwing.

As Nicholas Stoller presents The Kool-Aid Movie, Griffin is still in no shape for his speech, so Matt addresses the crowd while Maya prepares Griffin. Matt begins by feeling proud of the studio's upcoming slate, and then decides to get his staff to join him on stage to thank them. When he calls up Griffin, he is revealed to be hanging from wires above, and he accidentally falls to the stage. Griffin is unable to read the teleprompter and instead just utters "movies" repeatedly. Matt saves the presentation by having the audience and staff chant back and forth, ending on a high note. As the staff celebrates, Griffin dances while suspended by the wires.

== Production ==
=== Development ===
The episode was written by series co-creators Seth Rogen, Evan Goldberg, Peter Huyck, Alex Gregory, Frida Perez, and directed by Rogen and Goldberg. It marked Rogen's third writing credit, Goldberg's third writing credit, Huyck's fourth writing credit, Gregory's sixth writing credit, Perez's third writing credit, and the tenth directing credit for both Rogen and Goldberg.

Before the episode begins, Dave Franco provides a recap of the previous episode while inebriated. Rogen says that the idea was not originally in the script, and that it was a last-minute decision. Franco commented, "It was a brilliant idea to have the most fucked-up character at the party recap what happened at the party." According to Franco, he recorded the recap in just 10 minutes.

=== Casting ===
Zoë Kravitz was very delighted in playing a spoof version of herself in the episode, explaining "If you can't make fun of yourself, I think there's something wrong. And so I was really excited to make fun of myself, or the idea of myself, and the awards cycle, and all of that. I think it's something to laugh at and to explore — it's not just pointing and laughing."

Franco commented that he tried to maintain his energy even when he was not filming, "In-between takes, I was trying to conserve my energy. Nicholas Stoller was there — I've known him a long time and adore him, and I remember him trying to riff with me between takes. And then after a few takes, he realized: “Oh shit, Dave's exhausted. I'm going to let him be.” But it's just trying to find those moments to recharge during takes."

=== Filming ===
The episode was filmed at the same time as the prior episode, requiring 11 days. Evan Goldberg admitted the challenges of filming the two-part finale, "We left The Venetian once, to get an exterior shot of Seth almost getting heat stroke in 110-degree weather. Besides that, it was casino, casino, casino." Production designer Julie Berghoff said that as casinos were very strict over their depiction on media, they could not include scenes where the characters could buy drugs in the casinos.

== Critical reviews ==
"The Presentation" received mostly positive reviews from critics. Brian Tallerico of The A.V. Club gave the episode a "B+" grade and wrote, "The writing may be what truly elevates The Studio, but the show's greatest strength could also be its casting. Rogen has never been better, blending his comic timing with an undercurrent of privileged insecurity that can only come from decades of being around people like Matt Remick. Similarly, Ike Barinholtz is fantastic here, and Chase Sui Wonders feels like a new star who will be around for a while. The veterans in Catherine O'Hara and Kathryn Hahn take deep bites out of their funniest scenes, while the guest stars should dominate that category at the Emmys."

Keith Phipps of Vulture gave the episode a 3 star rating out of 5 and wrote, "“The Presentation” would make for a deeply unsatisfying series finale. Instead, it's an only mildly unsatisfying season finale. That's partly because it's hard not to imagine it working better as part of “CinemaCon”; it owes so much to its predecessor it can't help feeling a little slight and coda-like on its own. But it's also because Matt's flood of emotion feels like too neat a way to tie up his relationships with the others before the season ends. It also feels a bit too neat as an ending to Matt's own realization of how isolated and alone he's become by pursuing his job with such passion, though the expression he's wearing in the final shot introduces some notes of ambiguity."

Josh Rosenberg of Esquire wrote, "in The Studio, we end the first season with Remick feeling cautiously optimistic about the road ahead. He may have sold his soul to unleash Kool-Aid upon the world, but the adoration of the CinemaCon audience doesn't seem to bother him all too much. Ultimately, Rogen leaves us in a gray area — The Studio ends with a tinge of hope, even after satirizing how little is left."

Laura Wheatman Hill of The Daily Beast wrote, "O'Hara's subtle humor and empathy really came through in her work this season on The Last of Us, as the town therapist tasked with keeping everyone as mentally well as a person can be during a mushroom-zombie apocalypse. But The Last of Us won't be giving us any comedic zingers, at least not while I'm still crying over Joel. The Studio, however, has been top-notch comedy from the beginning, with an ensemble of hilarious core cast members, guest stars, and big-name cameos. Among this plethora of talent, O'Hara stood out without stealing focus."

Ben Sherlock of Screen Rant wrote, "Overall, The Studio's trip to CinemaCon makes for a satisfying finale. I couldn't be more thrilled that Apple has renewed The Studio for a second season. The show's satire of the modern film industry is spot-on, and this ensemble is too good to only stick around for 10 episodes — especially since we've just scratched the surface of these characters and the crazy world they inhabit." Roma Dean wrote, "the ensemble cast is at its best, punch after punch, we got Sal, Quinn, Patty, and Maya at their most charged, and united front, trying to do only what's right for the organization at the moment, forgetting all about their internal problems, right from episode 9, which set the stage for a fire finale."

=== Accolades ===
TVLine named Bryan Cranston as an honorable mention for the "Performer of the Week" for the week of May 24, 2025, for his performance in the episode. The site wrote: "In The Studio's season finale, Bryan Cranston gave a masterclass in physical comedy, as the very drugged up Continental CEO Griffin Mill pratfalled his way throughout Vegas, thanks to Matt's "old school Hollywood buffet." With a company-saving presentation on the line, Griffin's staff attempted to Weekend at Bernie's him, propping him up like a puppet so the man could show face at CinemaCon. And he kinda, sorta did, but not before Cranston absolutely unleashed, performing a sex act on a water fountain, continuously face-planting on the floor and later exploding with energy after being dosed with cocaine. Watching Griffin attempt to walk and talk like a normal functioning human led to some outrageous laughs, putting yet another feather in the Breaking Bad star's cap... and we can't wait to see the punch ol' Griffin will pack come Season 2."

Award	Year	Category	Recipient	Result	Ref.
Creative Arts Emmy Awards	2025	Outstanding Guest Actress in a Comedy Series	Zoë Kravitz	Nominated	
