= Birthing classes and birth plans =

Pregnancy-related medical care document

Birthing classes are classes to help parents to prepare for the birth of a baby and the first cares of a newborn, and a birth plan is a document created by a pregnant woman detailing her decisions and expectations regarding her labor and childbirth.

== Birth plan ==
The birth plan may be simple or detailed and complex, depending on individual preferences, and may be revised over the course of pregnancy if desired. One may be written at any point during pregnancy, though it is often recommended to do so during the third trimester and after the pregnant woman is provided with information about the physiology of delivery, as well as possible choices and risks. It is recommended that it be created with the support of a primary care provider. Once created, it is provided to the obstetrical care providers, with the intent of facilitating communication and emotional support for the pregnant woman, as well as the humanization of childbirth.

Birth plans were first introduced in the late 1970s and 1980s, in response to the effects of the medicalization of childbirth in which pregnant women had less and less control over the process and were instead expected to rely on decisions by medical practitioners. It has become increasingly popular in Western countries since then, and has been advocated for by the World Health Organization since 1996. Because it promotes decision-making by women, it has been considered to advance female empowerment.

In addition to preferences related to obstetrical care, a birth plan may include preferences for which individuals should be present at the birth for support, food and water intake, body position, care of the newborn regarding separation and skin-to-skin contact (Kangaroo care), breastfeeding, desired interventions if there are complications, pain relief, and cultural preferences.

A 2019 review of studies looking at the helpfulness of having a birth plan concluded that creation and use of a birth plan "positively influences the parturition process and maternal-fetal outcomes", though unrealistic expectations may cause a lack of satisfaction by some pregnant women. It stated that there was a need for greater awareness and support from medical professionals and use of flexible plans to increase maternal satisfaction. Another review, done in 2022, concluded that birth plans "were associated with positive outcomes for childbearing women when developed in collaboration with care providers." It found that creation of a collaborative birth plan could improve medical outcomes, increase a sense of control and satisfaction, and promote realistic expectations.

== Birthing classes ==
Birthing classes, also termed antenatal classes, help the parents to prepare for the baby's birth and care of the newborn. Individual fears and concerns can be discussed with professionals and others in the class. Classes include learning about the process of labor and birth and various medications and other pain management options. The classes may include information about what area hospitals provide for women in labor, such as facilities for water births. Besides water births, pain management may include aromatherapy, massage, and other plans to help the mother in labor. Breathing exercises, such as those used in the Lamaze method may be introduced. Lamaze method teaches the use of a "birth ball" (yoga or exercise ball) and spontaneous pushing. The Lamaze method teaches that labor is best allowed to begin on its own rather than being induced when not medically necessary.

A support person, such as a partner, friend, or family member, may attend some or all of the classes. They can learn how to support the mother and how to help with relaxation techniques. The Bradley method of natural childbirth relies heavily on training partners or other support persons to be labor "coaches". The role that a doula has in supporting and assisting the mother is also discussed. A large recent study that looked at reports of continuous support for women during labor found:

Continuous support during labour may improve outcomes for women and infants, including increased spontaneous vaginal birth, shorter duration of labour, and decreased caesarean birth, instrumental vaginal birth, use of any analgesia, use of regional analgesia, low five-minute Apgar score and negative feelings about childbirth experiences.

Some births require medical interventions. Women learn about the various drugs that may help her to cope with labor pains. A discussion of the use of pitocin or some other drug which may be used to induce labor as needed in some instances is discussed. Information about different kinds of interventions such as Caesarean section, forceps delivery, or vacuum delivery are also explained and discussed with the expectant mother.

Classes also teach early postpartum needs of the mother and her child. Some classes teach the importance of early skin-to-skin (SSC) care. It is supported by every major health delivery organization and the World Health Organization which states that "the process of childbirth is not finished until the baby has safely transferred from placental to mammary nutrition." WHO has designated hospitals that fulfill their Baby Friendly Hospital Initiative requirements as Baby Friendly. In the U.S., in 2019 more than 28% of births occurred in Baby Friendly hospitals in all fifty states with a total of 600.

Some mothers, such as vulnerable, young mothers pregnant with their first child, may have special needs and need more assistance than what they receive in birthing classes. Nurse-Family Partnership (NFP) is a non-profit organization operating in the United States and the UK. Each mother served is partnered with a registered nurse early in her pregnancy and receives ongoing nurse home visits that continue through her child's second birthday. NFP intervention has been associated with improvements in maternal health, child health, and economic security.
