= Seth Rogen filmography =

Canadian actor, comedian and filmmaker

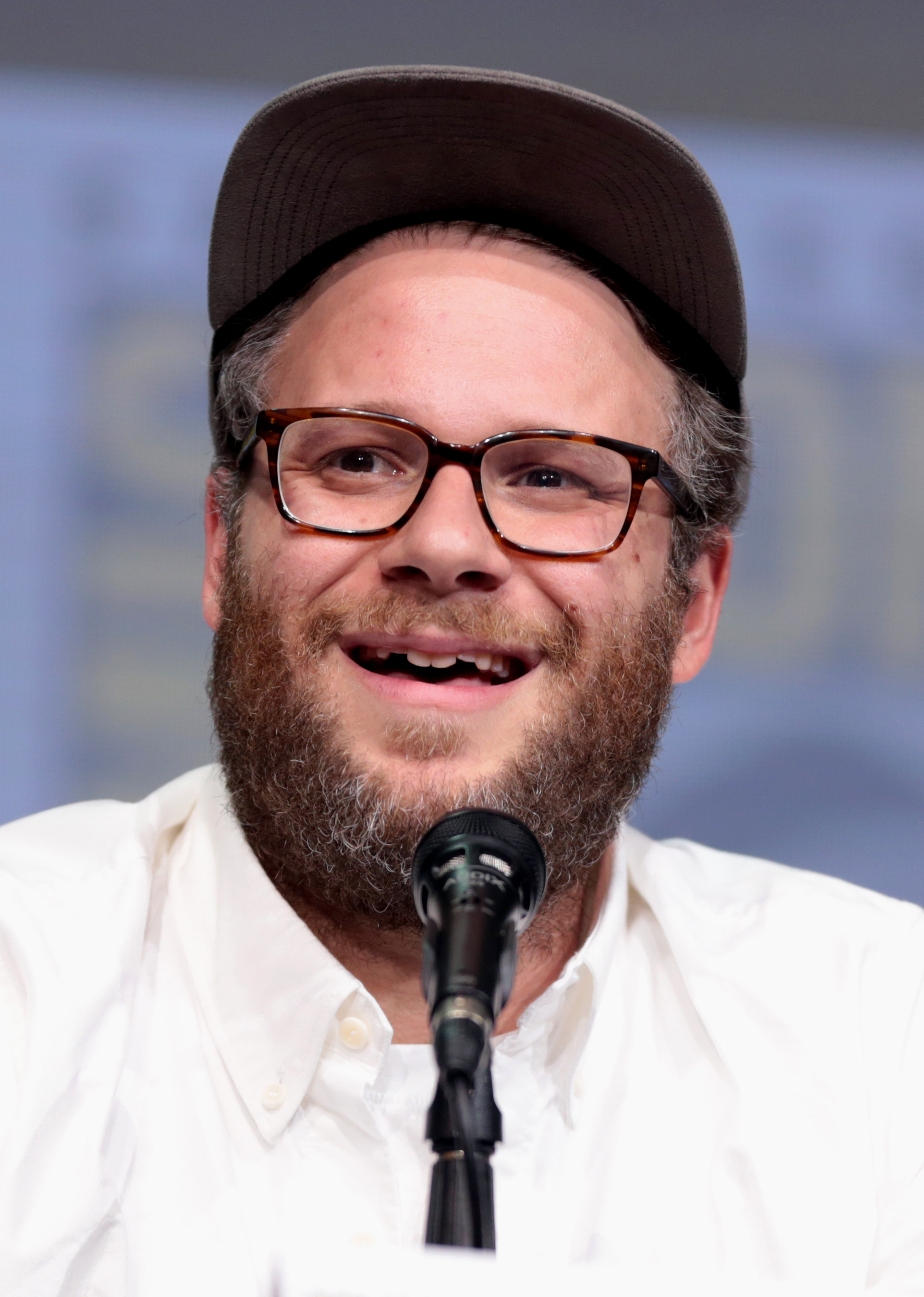
- Rogen at San Diego Comic-Con in 2017
- Film: 38
- Television series: 28
- Music videos: 1
- Others: 1

The following is the filmography of Canadian actor, comedian, filmmaker, and cannabis entrepreneur Seth Rogen.

== Film ==
=== As director/writer/producer ===
Year	Title	Director	Writer	Producer	Notes
2005	The 40-Year-Old Virgin	No	No	Co-producer	
2007	Knocked Up	No	No	Executive	
2007	Jay and Seth Versus the Apocalypse	No	Yes	Yes	Short film
2007	Superbad	No	Yes	Executive	
2008	Drillbit Taylor	No	Yes	No	
2008	Pineapple Express	No	Yes	Executive	
2009	Funny People	No	No	Executive	
2011	The Green Hornet	No	Yes	Executive	
2011	50/50	No	No	Yes	
2012	The Watch	No	Yes	No	
2012	The Guilt Trip	No	No	Executive	
2013	This Is the End	Yes	Yes	Yes	Co-directed with Evan Goldberg
2014	Neighbors	No	No	Yes	
2014	The Interview	Yes	Story	Yes	Co-directed with Evan Goldberg
2015	The Night Before	No	No	Yes	
2016	Sausage Party	No	Yes	Yes	Also lyricist: "The Great Beyond"
2016	Neighbors 2: Sorority Rising	No	Yes	Yes	
2017	Bananas Town	Yes	No	No	Short film Co-directed with Evan Goldberg
2017	Dumpster Diving	Yes	No	No	Short film Co-directed with Evan Goldberg
2017	The Disaster Artist	No	No	Yes	
2018	Blockers	No	No	Yes	
2018	Game Over, Man!	No	No	Yes	
2019	Long Shot	No	No	Yes	
2019	Good Boys	No	No	Yes	
2020	An American Pickle	No	No	Yes	
2023	Joy Ride	No	No	Yes	
2023	Cobweb	No	No	Yes	
2023	Teenage Mutant Ninja Turtles: Mutant Mayhem	No	Yes	Yes	
2024	Miller's Girl	No	No	Yes	
2025	Teenage Mutant Ninja Turtles: Chrome Alone 2 – Lost in New Jersey	No	No	Yes	Short film
2026	The Wrong Girls	No	No	Yes	
2027	4 Kids Walk Into a Bank	No	No	Yes	
2027	Untitled Teenage Mutant Ninja Turtles: Mutant Mayhem sequel	No	TBA	Yes	
TBA	Untitled Home Alone sequel	No	Yes	Yes	

=== Film acting roles ===
Year	Title	Role	Notes
2001	Donnie Darko	Ricky Danforth	
2004	Anchorman: The Legend of Ron Burgundy	Scotty the Cameraman	
2005	The 40-Year-Old Virgin	Cal	
2006	You, Me and Dupree	Neil	
2007	Shrek the Third	Ship Captain (voice)	Cameo
2007	Knocked Up	Ben Stone	
2007	Jay and Seth Versus the Apocalypse	Seth	Short film
2007	Superbad	Officer Michaels	
2008	The Spiderwick Chronicles	Hogsqueal (voice)	
2008	Horton Hears a Who!	Morton (voice)	
2008	Kung Fu Panda	Mantis (voice)	
2008	Step Brothers	Sporting Goods Manager	Cameo
2008	Pineapple Express	Dale Denton	
2008	Zack and Miri Make a Porno	Zack Brown	
2009	Fanboys	Admiral Seasholtz, Alien, Roach	
2009	Monsters vs. Aliens	B.O.B. (voice)	
2009	Observe and Report	Ronnie Barnhardt	
2009	Funny People	Ira Wright	
2009	B.O.B.'s Big Break	B.O.B. (voice)	Short film
2009	Paper Heart	Himself	Cameo
2011	The Green Hornet	Britt Reid / The Green Hornet	
2011	Paul	Paul (voice)	
2011	Kung Fu Panda 2	Mantis (voice)	
2011	50/50	Kyle Hirons	
2011	Take This Waltz	Lou Rubin	
2011	Kung Fu Panda: Secrets of the Masters	Mantis (voice)	Short film
2011	Night of the Living Carrots	B.O.B. (voice)	Short film
2012	For a Good Time, Call...	Jerry	Cameo
2012	The Guilt Trip	Andy Brewster	
2013	This Is the End	Himself	
2014	Neighbors	Mac Radner	
2014	22 Jump Street	Morton Schmidt	Uncredited cameo
2014	The Sound and the Fury	Telegraph Operator	Cameo
2014	Cops, Cum, Dicks and Flying	Durand	Short film
2014	The Interview	Aaron Rapoport	
2015	Steve Jobs	Steve Wozniak	
2015	The Night Before	Isaac	
2015	Kung Fu Panda: Secrets of the Scroll	Mantis (voice)	Short film
2015	Being Canadian	Himself	Documentary
2016	Kung Fu Panda 3	Mantis (voice)	
2016	Neighbors 2: Sorority Rising	Mac Radner	
2016	Sausage Party	Frank / Sergeant Pepper (voices)	
2017	The Disaster Artist	Sandy Schklair	
2018	Arizona	Gary	Uncredited cameo
2018	Like Father	Jeff	
2019	Long Shot	Fred Flarsky	
2019	The Lion King	Pumbaa (voice)	
2019	Zeroville	Viking Man	Cameo
2020	An American Pickle	Herschel Greenbaum / Ben Greenbaum	
2022	Chip 'n Dale: Rescue Rangers	Bob the Viking / Pumbaa / Mantis / B.O.B. (voices)	
2022	The Fabelmans	Bennie Loewy	
2022	Being Mortal		Abandoned film
2023	The Super Mario Bros. Movie	Donkey Kong (voice)	
2023	Maximum Truth	Himself	
2023	Teenage Mutant Ninja Turtles: Mutant Mayhem	Bebop (voice)	
2023	Dumb Money	Gabe Plotkin	
2024	Kung Fu Panda 4	Mantis (voice)	Cameo
2024	Mufasa: The Lion King	Pumbaa (voice)	
2025	Animal Farm	Napoleon (voice)	
2025	Good Fortune	Jeff	
2026	The Invite	Joe	
2026	Tangles	Zach (voice)	
2026	Supergirl	Lloyd (voice)	Cameo
2026	The Wrong Girls	Dio (voice)	
2026	Babies	Aaron	Completed

== Television ==
=== As director/writer/producer ===
Year	Title	Creator	Director	Writer	Executive producer	Notes
2001–2002	Undeclared	No	No	Yes	No	5 episodes
2004	Da Ali G Show	No	No	Yes	No	6 episodes
2009	The Simpsons	No	No	Yes	No	Episode: "Homer the Whopper"
2013–2014	The League	No	No	Yes	No	2 episodes
2016–2019	Preacher	Yes	Yes	Story	Yes	Developer; Directed 4 episodes Co-wrote the story of episode: "Pilot" with Evan Goldberg and Sam Catlin
2017–2020	Future Man	No	Yes	No	Yes	Directed 3 episodes
2019–2021	Black Monday	No	Yes	No	Yes	Directed episode: "365"
2019–2026	The Boys	No	No	No	Yes	
2021–present	Invincible	No	No	No	Yes	
2021	Santa Inc.	No	No	No	Yes	
2022	Pam & Tommy	No	No	No	Yes	Co-developer
2022	The Boys Presents: Diabolical	Yes	No	Yes	Yes	
2023	Paul T. Goldman	No	No	No	Yes	
2023–present	Platonic	No	No	No	Yes	
2023–2025	Gen V	No	No	No	Yes	
2024	The Great Canadian Pottery Throw Down	No	No	No	Yes	
2024–2025	Sausage Party: Foodtopia	Yes	No	Yes	Yes	Co-creator with Evan Goldberg and Conrad Vernon; Co-wrote episode: "First Course" with Evan Goldberg, Kyle Hunter and Ariel Shaffir
2024–2025	Tales of the Teenage Mutant Ninja Turtles	No	No	No	Yes	
2025–present	The Studio	Yes	Yes	Yes	Yes	
2026	The Muppet Show	No	No	No	Yes	Executive producer with Evan Goldberg and Sabrina Carpenter.
TBA	Darkwing Duck	Yes	No	No	Yes	Reboot; Co-developer
TBA	TaleSpin	Yes	No	No	Yes	Reboot; Co-developer

=== TV acting roles ===
Year	Title	Role	Notes
1999–2000	Freaks and Geeks	Ken Miller	14 episodes
2001–2002	Undeclared	Ron Garner	18 episodes
2003	Dawson's Creek	Bob	Episode: "Rock Bottom"
2006	American Dad!	Student	Voice, episode: "Camp Refoogee"
2006	Help Me Help You	Seth	Episode: "Working Women"
2007–2014	Saturday Night Live	Himself (host)	3 episodes
2009	81st Academy Awards	Dale Denton	Television special
2009	Family Guy	Himself	Voice, 2 episodes
2009–2024	The Simpsons	Lyle McCarthy / Himself	Voice, 3 episodes
2009	Monsters vs. Aliens: Mutant Pumpkins from Outer Space	B.O.B.	Voice, television special
2010	Kung Fu Panda Holiday	Mantis	Voice, television special
2011	Take Two with Phineas and Ferb	Himself	Episode: "Take Two with Phineas and Ferb: Seth Rogen"
2011	2011 MTV Video Music Awards	Future Mike D	Television special
2011–2014	The League	Dirty Randy	6 episodes
2012	Eastbound & Down	Texas Pitcher	Episode: "Chapter 21"
2012	27th Independent Spirit Awards	Himself (host)	Television special
2012	Comedy Bang! Bang!	Himself	Episode: "Seth Rogen Wears A Plaid Shirt & Brown Pants"
2013	Comedy Central Roast of James Franco	Himself (host)	Television special
2013	The Mindy Project	Sam Kleinfeld	Episode: "The One That Got Away"
2013	Arrested Development	Young George Bluth Sr.	4 episodes
2013	Burning Love	Roger	2 episodes
2013–2015	Kroll Show	Various characters	4 episodes
2014	Loiter Squad	Little Girl	Episode: "Figure Four Leg Lock"
2014	The Comeback	Himself	2 episodes
2015	Broad City	Male Stacy	Episode: "In Heat"
2016	Martha & Snoop's Potluck Dinner Party	Himself	Episode: "Putting the Pot in Potluck"
2017	Dr. Ken	Himself	Episode: "Ken's Big Audition"
2017	Friends from College	Paul "Party Dog" Dobkin	Episode: "Second Wedding"
2018	Seth Rogen's Hilarity for Charity	Himself	Television Special
2018–2019	Drunk History	Various roles	2 episodes
2018	The Jim Jefferies Show	Coal Clean	2 episodes
2019	The Twilight Zone	Himself as Adam Wegman	Episode: "Blurryman"
2019–2020	Future Man	Susan	5 episodes
2019–2026	The Boys	Himself / Sircumsalot	4 episodes
2019	The Price Is Right at Night	Himself	Episode: "A Holiday Extravaganza with Seth Rogen"
2020	Home Movie: The Princess Bride	Miracle Max	Episode: "Chapter Nine: Have Fun Storming The Castle!"
2020	Muppets Now	Himself	Episode: "Socalized"
2020	Big Mouth	Seth Goldberg	Voice, 3 episodes
2021–present	Invincible	Allen the Alien	Voice, supporting role
2021	Curb Your Enthusiasm	Himself	Episode: "Man Fights Tiny Woman"
2021	Santa Inc.	Santa Claus	Voice, 8 episodes
2022	Pam & Tommy	Rand Gauthier	8 episodes
2022	The Boys Presents: Diabolical	Drug Dealer	Voice, episode: "BFFs"
2023	History of the World, Part II	Noah	Episode: "III"
2023–present	Platonic	Will Zysman	Main role
2024	The Great Canadian Pottery Throw Down	Himself	Guest judge
2024–2025	Sausage Party: Foodtopia	Frank	Voice, Main role
2024	Krapopolis	Thor	Voice, episode: “Thor”
2025–present	The Studio	Matt Remick	Main role
2025	Nobody Wants This	Rabbi Neil	2 episodes
2025	Tales of the Teenage Mutant Ninja Turtles	Bebop	Voice, episode: "Raph Fights Everyone"
2026	The Muppet Show	Himself	Television special
TBA	Darkwing Duck	Launchpad McQuack	Voice, Main role

== Video games ==
Year	Title	Voice role
2009	Monsters vs. Aliens	B.O.B.
2025	Call of Duty: Black Ops 6	Himself

== Music videos ==
Year	Title	Role	Artist
2009	"Like a Boss"	Performance Reviewer	The Lonely Island
2011	"Make Some Noise"	Mike D (B-Boys 1)	Beastie Boys

== See also ==
- List of awards and nominations received by Seth Rogen
