= Derek Wilson (actor) =

American actor

- Born: July 19, 1982 (age 44); Bowling Green, Kentucky, U.S.
- Education: Western Kentucky University (BA); New York University (MFA)
- Occupation: Actor
- Years active: 2008–present

Derek Wilson (born July 19, 1982) is an American actor known for his roles as Donnie Schenck in the AMC supernatural drama Preacher (2016), Wolf in the Hulu science-fiction comedy series Future Man (2017–2020), and Robert Vernon, also known as Tek Knight, in the Amazon Prime Video superhero series Gen V (2023) and The Boys (2024).

Wilson began his career in theatre, performing in Shakespearean productions before transitioning to television. His portrayal of Wolf in Future Man attracted critical attention for its combination of physical comedy and deadpan humour.

== Early life and education ==
Wilson was born on July 19, 1982, in Bowling Green, Kentucky, where he grew up. During his childhood and adolescence, he participated in sports before developing an interest in theatre.

Wilson attended Western Kentucky University, where he earned a bachelor's degree and became involved in the university's theatre programme. In a 2019 interview, Wilson recalled initially choosing theatre as his major partly to defy his parents. He subsequently developed an interest in acting and participated in different aspects of theatrical production.

After graduating, Wilson moved to New York City, where he worked in sound design and pursued stage acting. He later enrolled in the graduate acting programme at the New York University Tisch School of the Arts, earning a Master of Fine Arts degree.

Wilson recalled auditioning for Tisch while suffering from a high fever. During his early years as a professional actor, he supported himself through other employment, including waiting tables, while seeking acting opportunities.

His theatrical background included numerous productions of works by William Shakespeare, as well as performances in Anna Christie and Macbeth.

== Career ==
=== Early television work and Preacher ===
Wilson began appearing on television in the late 2000s. His early credits included guest roles in The Good Wife, Person of Interest, Rectify and Aquarius.

After working primarily in New York theatre, Wilson travelled to Los Angeles during television pilot season. He subsequently secured the role of Donnie Schenck in the first season of AMC's supernatural drama Preacher, adapted from the comic-book series by Garth Ennis and Steve Dillon.

Donnie, a violent associate of the series' protagonist Jesse Custer, played by Dominic Cooper, was a recurring antagonist during the show's first season. Wilson appeared in nine episodes in 2016.

His involvement in Preacher introduced him to executive producers Seth Rogen and Evan Goldberg, who subsequently worked with him on Future Man.

=== Breakthrough with Future Man ===
From 2017 to 2020, Wilson starred as Wolf in the Hulu science-fiction comedy series Future Man, alongside Josh Hutcherson and Eliza Coupe. The series follows a janitor and video-game enthusiast recruited by two warriors from a dystopian future to prevent humanity's destruction.

Wilson's character is initially presented as an aggressive, socially inexperienced soldier whose encounters with different historical periods gradually transform his personality. During the first season, Wolf develops an enthusiasm for 1980s American culture, adopts the name Corey Wolf-Hart and becomes involved in the restaurant business.

Wilson explained that he was recruited to the series while still working on Preacher, leaving him little time to prepare for the pilot. He subsequently developed Wolf's distinctive voice and physical mannerisms as the character evolved.

The role received favourable attention from television critics. Writing for The A.V. Club, critics singled out Wilson's performance, particularly his portrayal of Wolf's growing fascination with contemporary society and the excesses of the 1980s.

In its review of the episode "Beyond the Truffledome", The A.V. Club praised Wilson's energetic performance during a storyline charting Wolf's rise and fall as a celebrity restaurateur.

Variety also highlighted Wilson's deadpan reactions and physical comedy, although its overall review of the series was mixed.

Wilson continued in the principal cast throughout all three seasons. In the second season, he also portrayed Torque Wheelmaker, an alternate version of Wolf. In interviews, Wilson discussed drawing on his Shakespearean stage training to sustain the character's unusual vocal delivery.

=== Film roles and voice acting ===
Alongside his television work, Wilson appeared in independent films including Wet Behind the Ears (2013), Life Hack (2017) and Oxalis (2018).

In 2020, he played Detective Tim Munroe in the DC Extended Universe film Birds of Prey.

He also provided the voice of Spider in the animated feature Teenage Mutant Ninja Turtles: Mutant Mayhem (2023).

=== Gen V, The Boys and later work ===
In 2023, Wilson joined the cast of Gen V, the spin-off of Prime Video's superhero satire The Boys, as Robert Vernon, better known as Tek Knight. The character, adapted from the comic books by Garth Ennis and Darick Robertson, is a superhero and television personality whose investigative programme is used to expose scandals.

Wilson made his first appearance in the Gen V episode "The Whole Truth", in which Tek Knight investigates the circumstances surrounding the death of a student at Godolkin University. The character had previously been mentioned in The Boys but had not appeared on screen.

Wilson reprised the role in the fourth season of The Boys in 2024. Tek Knight's portrayal in the television adaptation differs from the comic-book version, combining the character's superhero identity with a satirical depiction of a wealthy media personality.

Wilson subsequently appeared in the final season of the Showtime drama Billions and guest-starred as Josh Fleisher in "The Pediatric Oncologist", a 2025 episode of the Apple TV+ comedy series The Studio.

== Personal life ==
Wilson has discussed his interest in sports, particularly college basketball and tennis, in interviews. He is a supporter of the Louisville Cardinals men's basketball team.

In a 2019 interview, Wilson said that he had previously followed a vegan diet and subsequently adopted a vegetarian diet.

== Filmography ==
=== Film ===
Year	Title	Role	Notes
2009	Brother's Blood	James	Short film
2013	Wet Behind the Ears	Brian	
2014	The Gene	Dr. Noah Cobb	Short film
2015	The Last Girl	James	Short film
2015	Woodshed	Jacob	Short film
2017	Life Hack	Charlie	
2018	Oxalis	Dean Ruster	
2020	Birds of Prey	Detective Tim Munroe	
2023	Teenage Mutant Ninja Turtles: Mutant Mayhem	Spider	Voice role

=== Television ===
Year	Title	Role	Notes
2008	In the Now	Derek	4 episodes
2013	The Good Wife	Morgan Croft	Episode: "Je Ne Sais What?"
2013	Person of Interest	Dennis Cunningham	Episode: "Proteus"
2013–2014	Rectify	Kent Benny	2 episodes
2016	Aquarius	Captain Welles	Episode: "Revolution 1"
2016	Preacher	Donnie Schenck	Main cast, season 1; 9 episodes
2017–2020	Future Man	Wolf / Corey Wolf-Hart / Torque Wheelmaker	Main cast
2018	Gwennie G's Thoughts on Things	Terry	Voice role
2023	Gen V	Robert Vernon / Tek Knight	Episode: "The Whole Truth"
2023	Billions	Derek	Episode: "Enemies List"
2024	The Boys	Robert Vernon / Tek Knight	3 episodes
2025	The Studio	Josh Fleisher	Episode: "The Pediatric Oncologist"
