= Houseplant (company) =

Cannabis company

- Industry: Cannabis home goods
- Founded: 2019; 7 years ago in Canada; March 11, 2021; 5 years ago in the United States
- Founder: Seth Rogen; Evan Goldberg; Michael Mohr
- Area served: Canada; United States (initially California)
- Products: Ceramic ashtrays, planters
- Website: www.houseplant.ca (Canada) www.houseplant.com (US)

Houseplant is a cannabis company co-founded by Canadian actor and comedian Seth Rogen, American-Canadian businessman Michael Mohr, and Canadian screenwriter Evan Goldberg.

== History ==
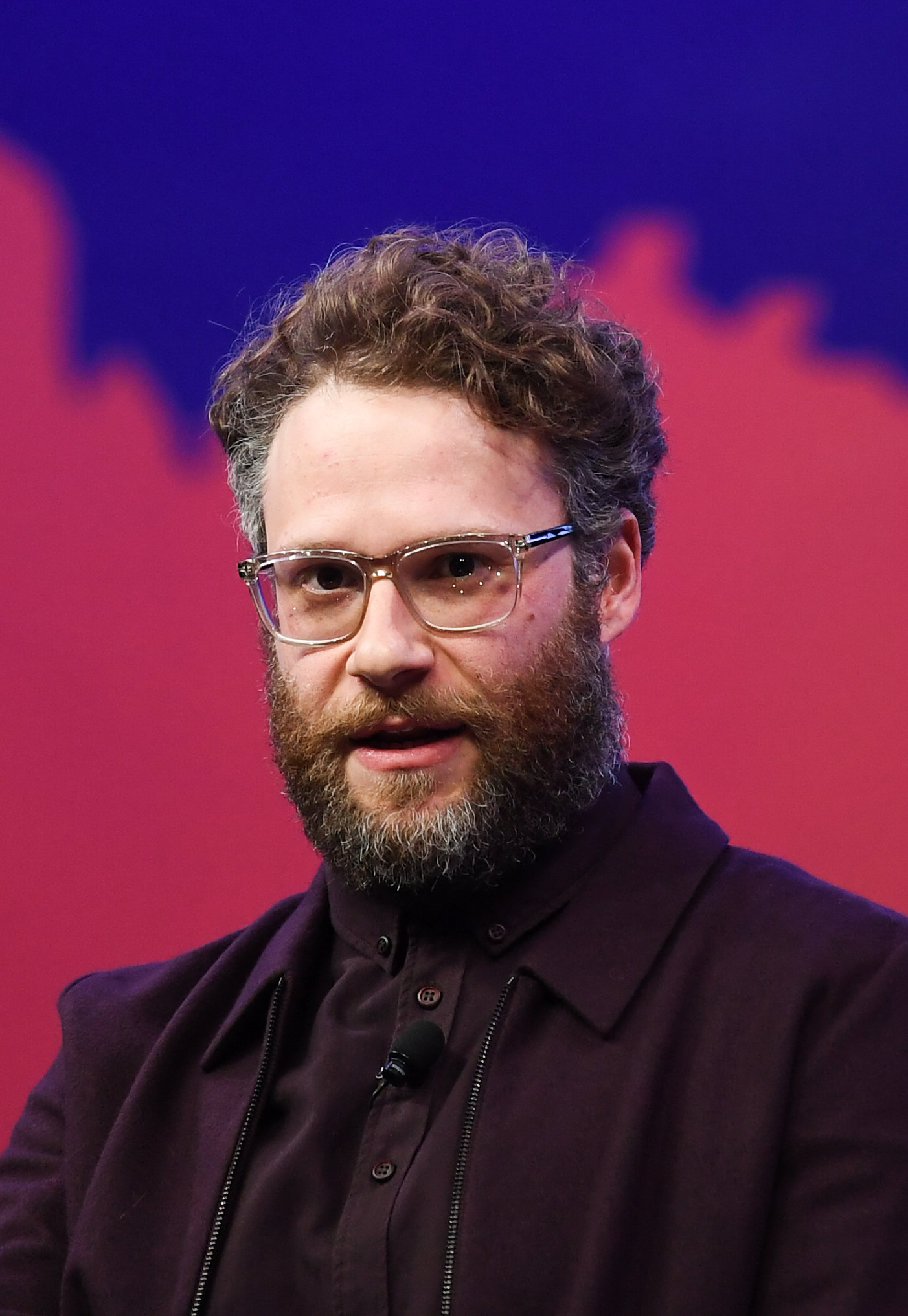
Seth Rogen, co-founder of Houseplant

Initially launched in Canada in 2019, Rogen announced the company's March 11 expansion into the United States starting in California on March 1, 2021. The announcement was popular enough for Houseplant's United States website to crash due to increased traffic.

In January 2023, Houseplant partnered with Airbnb, to offer a three-night stay at a house purposed for cannabis use and fellowship with the actor.

== Description and products ==
Rogen looked at "hundreds" of cannabis strains before choosing three for the initial launch. The strains Diablo Wind, Pink Moon, and Pancake Ice were named after weather systems in reference to the strains found in his 2008 film Pineapple Express. In addition, Houseplant also sells vinyl mixtapes that correspond to and are meant to be played under the effects of the initial three-strain line. Houseplant's name is derived from the company's sale of both home goods, such as ashtrays and ceramics, under the "Housegoods" name (house) and cannabis products (plant). According to Nerdist, Rogen has not mentioned the source of the cannabis nor his professional relationship with the growers.

The company also sells various home accessories, such as elaborate ashtrays, table lighters, planters, turn tables, and record collections.
