= Jay and Seth Versus the Apocalypse =

- Film poster
- Directed by: Jason Stone
- Written by: Seth Rogen; Evan Goldberg; Jason Stone
- Produced by: Rachel Robb Kondrath; Jason Stone
- Starring: Seth Rogen; Jay Baruchel
- Cinematography: Jay Visit
- Edited by: Neel Upadhye
- Music by: Mark Petrie
- Production company: Catastrophic Films
- Distributed by: Mandate Pictures; Sony Pictures Home Entertainment
- Release date: June 4, 2007
- Running time: 10 minutes
- Country: United States
- Language: English

Jay and Seth Versus the Apocalypse is a 2007 American apocalyptic comedy horror short film written and directed by Jason Stone and co-written by Seth Rogen and Evan Goldberg. The film, a 10-minute short, stars actors Seth Rogen and Jay Baruchel. Initially an 85-second trailer was uploaded to YouTube containing some lines of dialogue that were not included in the full 10-minute short later uploaded to YouTube. It was later adapted into a theatrical feature-length film titled This Is the End (2013) and fully released on its full-length counterpart's Blu-ray release.

Jay and Seth Versus the Apocalypse follows fictionalized versions of the two actors who have shut themselves in their apartment and argue over their predicament during some unspecified end-of-the-world event.

== Plot ==
Seth and Jay are holed-up in a filthy cockroach-infested apartment while something terrible but unspecified is going on outside. After a series of trivial arguments, they decide that the need for water is such that one of them must go outside the heavily barricaded house to fix the supply – a job which requires going onto the roof.

Jay reluctantly goes, having accepted that it's his turn. While Jay is still on the roof after restoring the water supply, an anxious Seth hears a shot from the pistol Jay was carrying. A bathroom window is broken from the outside and Seth's anxiety increases. Seth's shouts to Jay are met with silence, as blood begins to flow through the faucet. Seth sits trembling on the floor, back to the wall, and clutching a table leg with nails through the end.

== Production ==
Immediately after wrapping production on Knocked Up, Stone and Goldberg worked to turn around the short's script in only three weeks. Principal photography lasted for two days in September 2006, with one day of pick-ups in January 2007. Rachel Robb Kondrath, who co-produced the short with Stone, was also the production designer, and the few visual effects were provided by The Orphanage under co-founder Scott Stewart. After the trailer they put up on YouTube in June 2007 got over 50,000 hits in the first two weeks, Stone and Goldberg began shopping the project around. Variety reports that several production companies vied for the rights for production.

In October 2011, it was announced that there would be a feature film adaptation of the trailer titled This Is the End. The film was released on June 12, 2013, and co-stars James Franco, Jonah Hill, Craig Robinson and Danny McBride. The plot centers around the group having a party at Franco's house when the apocalypse commences. Many celebrity cameos occur during the film, including Jason Segel, Emma Watson, Michael Cera, Rihanna, Aziz Ansari, Paul Rudd and Channing Tatum. On October 1, 2013, Jay and Seth Versus the Apocalypse was finally released in full as a Blu-ray exclusive feature on the home video release on This Is the End.

== Reception ==
A clip uploaded to YouTube was billed as a trailer because when it was first posted the filmmakers intended to publicly screen the short at festivals. However, when the film was picked up by Mandate, the short was shelved from festival consideration. This frustrated many fans who expected to see a feature closer to the 2007 release of the trailer online.
