= Rati Gupta =

American actress

- Born: February 9, 1984 (age 42); Valparaiso, Indiana, U.S.
- Occupations: Actor, storyteller
- Years active: 2010–present
- Website: ratigupta.com

Rati Gupta (born February 9, 1984) is an American actor and storyteller known for her recurring role as Anu, the fiancée of Rajesh Ramayan Koothrappali in the CBS sitcom The Big Bang Theory, and for telling humorous stories about her experiences.

== Early life ==
Gupta was born in Valparaiso, Indiana, to parents who had moved to the United States from India. She grew up in Michigan City, Indiana. Her father, a physician, came from a small town north of New Delhi. Her mother came from Varanasi. While her parents were both born in North India, Gupta does not speak Hindi. She has a brother who also is a physician. Gupta was salutatorian of her class at Marquette Catholic High School, after which she graduated from Northwestern University as a psychology and dance double major, while fulfilling premed requirements at the same time. While at Northwestern, she was director of its drum, dance, and rhythm ensemble.

== Career ==
Rather than follow her father and brother into medicine, Gupta moved to Los Angeles and began dancing 16 hours a day, appearing in videos including for Lupe Fiasco and Flo Rida. Although her initial career interest was dancing, she kept hitting "wall after wall", leaving her feeling dejected. She eventually decided to try out acting and received her first acting lessons from an individual she describes as the "go-to sitcom comedy teacher".

She appeared in a recurring role in season 2 of the Hulu series Future Man and in a guest role on the Netflix series Unbelievable. Her acting credits also include MTV film Worst. Prom. Ever. and the FX comedy Better Things. She is known for her recurring role as Anu, the fiancée of Rajesh Ramayan Koothrappali in the CBS sitcom The Big Bang Theory.

While she wasn't presented roles "that represent her", she traveled around the country telling humorous stories about her experiences. She was champion three times at The Moth StorySLAM. Her one-woman storytelling presentation, Not Another Teen Solo Show, was nominated for Best Solo/Duo at the LA Comedy Festival, and was named one of the Top 3 Performances of the New York International Fringe Festival by Backstage. Some of the other venues where she has told her stories include the Hollywood Fringe Festival, the Chicago Fringe Festival, The Improv in Hollywood, the Upright Citizens Brigade Theater, and The Comedy Store.

== Filmography ==
=== Television and internet ===
Year	Title	Role	Notes
2011	Worst.Prom.Ever	Nikki	TV movie
2014–2018	Does This Baby Make Me Look Fat?	Story Editor	Web series; 55 episodes
2016	Better Things	Bank Teller	1 episode
2018–2019	The Big Bang Theory	Anu	9 episodes
2019–2020	Future Man	Rake	7 episodes
2019	Unbelievable	Sally Green	1 episode
2020	Heart Baby Eggplant	Rati	Web series; 7 episodes; also writer and executive producer

=== Film ===
Year	Title	Role	Notes
2011	Where the Road Meets the Sun	Yamini	
2011	Second Best	Shwerta	Short film
2013	Mortified Nation	Self	Documentary / Comedy

=== Choreography ===
Year	Title	Role	Notes
2010	Maro Charitra	Assistant Choreographer	
