= Future Man (TV series) =

American science fiction sitcom

- Genre: Science fiction; Action; Adventure; Comedy
- Created by: Howard Overman; Kyle Hunter; Ariel Shaffir
- Starring: Josh Hutcherson; Eliza Coupe; Derek Wilson; Ed Begley Jr.; Glenne Headly; Haley Joel Osment; Seth Rogen
- Composer: Halli Cauthery
- Country of origin: United States
- Original language: English
- No. of seasons: 3
- No. of episodes: 34

Production
- Executive producers: Seth Rogen; Evan Goldberg; Matt Tolmach; Ben Karlin; James Weaver; Kyle Hunter; Ariel Shaffir
- Producers: Josh Hutcherson; Mychelle Deschamps; Shawn Wilt
- Production location: Los Angeles
- Cinematography: Brandon Trost; Cort Fey
- Editors: Tirsa Hackshaw; Brent White
- Camera setup: Single-camera
- Running time: 27–35 minutes
- Production companies: Point Grey Pictures; Matt Tolmach Productions; Turkeyfoot Productions; Sony Pictures Television Studios (Note: Credited as Sony Pictures Television for seasons 1–2 and the first five episodes of season 3.)

Original release
- Network: Hulu
- Release: November 14, 2017 – April 3, 2020

Future Man is an American comic science fiction sitcom created by Howard Overman, Kyle Hunter and Ariel Shaffir that premiered on November 14, 2017 on Hulu. The series follows an underachieving janitor who is called upon to save the world. It stars Josh Hutcherson, Eliza Coupe, Derek Wilson, Ed Begley Jr., Glenne Headly, Seth Rogen and Haley Joel Osment in recurring roles and is executive produced by Rogen and Evan Goldberg. A third and final season was released on April 3, 2020. It was later removed from all Disney streaming services including Hulu and Disney+ in May 2023 due to Disney's budget cuts.

== Premise ==
An aimless janitor, Josh Futturman, leads a nondescript life. Josh's sole hobby is playing video games, specifically Biotic Wars, a game considered unbeatable. After finally completing the game after many attempts, the game's two main characters, Tiger and Wolf, suddenly appear and recruit Josh to save the world from the real Biotic Wars. Josh and his companions travel through time to change the future.

== Cast and characters ==
=== Main ===
- Josh Hutcherson as Josh Futturman, a young man, without a sense of direction in life, who works at a high-level medical research facility as a janitor, still lives with his parents, and is the only person in existence to finish Biotic Wars, which prompts life-traveling soldiers from the future to appear and hail him as the savior, "Future Man", recruiting Josh for their war.
- Eliza Coupe as Tiger: the commander of a rebel unit from the distant future who travels back in time to recruit Josh into aiding their mission to prevent a deadly war from occurring.
  - In Season 2, Coupe also plays Ty-Anne Camillo, an alternate timeline version of Tiger created by the events that unfurled after Tiger, Josh and Wolf were ultimately successful in their original mission by stopping Kronish's cure from being made public, who is Stu Camillo's adoptive daughter.
- Derek Wilson as Wolf, the sole surviving member of Tiger's unit from the future, who joins her in attempting to recruit Josh.
  - In Season 2, Wilson also plays Torque, an alternate timeline version of Wolf created by events after Kronish's eventual defeat.
- Ed Begley, Jr. as Gabe Futturman (season 1), Josh's father.
- Glenne Headly as Diane Futturman (season 1), Josh's mother.
- Keith David as Doctor Elias Kronish (season 1), a scientist whose contraction of herpes at a young age spurs him on a lifelong search for a cure, which leads to a super panacea for all diseases that is responsible for the eventual creation of the Biotics.
- Haley Joel Osment as Doctor Stu Camillo (season 2; recurring season 1), a scientist initially working for Dr. Kronish, who goes on to become an A.I. and create the Bio-techs from Tiger's DNA after Kronish's plan for a super cure has been stopped by Josh.
- Seth Rogen as Susan Saint Jackalope (season 3; guest season 2), the presenter of "The DieCathalon", a Running Man–inspired death game, which collects people from time to hunt for fun.

=== Recurring ===
- Robert Craighead as Vincent Skarsgaard (season 1; guest season 2), a seasoned police officer pursuing Tiger and Wolf linearly across decades for the murder of his partner when he was a rookie cop.
- Britt Lower as Jeri Elizabeth Lang/Jeri (season 1; guest season 2), a time-travelling Biotic sent back to monitor and intervene at Kronish's lab. Jeri is a Bio-tech and member of the resistance to Stu Carmillo
- Kevin Caliber as Blaze (season 1)
- Paul Scheer as Paul, World-8 video game store manager and then employee of Josh's. (season 1; guest season 2)
- Awkwafina as Tracy, World-8 video game store clerk and then employee of Josh's (season 1)
- Katherine LaNasa as Athena/Dr Hogeveen (season 2), the founder of the Resistance, assistant to Stu and nanny of Ty-Anne.
- Artemis Pebdani as Doctor Mina Ahmadi (season 2), an AI aspect of Stu who serves as his therapist.
- Ricky Mabe as Pump (season 2)
- Shaun Brown as Hatchet (season 2)
- Sara Amini as Thimble (season 2)
- Rati Gupta as Rake (season 2)
- Tim Johnson Jr. as Jimmy (season 2)
- Jade Catta-Preta as Level (season 2)
- Timothy Hornor as Lathe (season 2)
- Kimberly Hébert Gregory as Mathers (season 3), a single-minded bureaucrat hunting Wolf, Tiger, and Josh on behalf of the network.
- Fajer Al-Kaisi as Bin Laden (season 3), an atheist version of the real-life terrorist from an alternate reality where he was prevented from becoming one.
- Nick Wyman as Abraham Lincoln (season 3), a resident of Haven and former President of the United States rescued from death by Josh.
- Laurent Pitre as Big Time (season 3), a college student and accidental creator of time travel, Haven and the Big Suck.

=== Guest ===
- Ron Funches as Ray ("Pilot")
- Martin Starr as Lyle Karofsky ("A Fuel's Errand")
- David Koechner as Barry Futturman ("A Blowjob Before Dying")
- Carolyn Hennesy as Wanda ("A Blowjob Before Dying")
- Megan Hayes as the voice of SIGORN-E ("Pandora's Mailbox")
- Charlie McDermott as young Barry Futturman ("Operation: Natal Attraction")
- Diona Reasonover as Estelle Kronish (seasons 1–2; "Beyond the TruffleDome" and "The Last Horchata")
- Corey Hart as himself ("Prelude to an Apocalypse")
- Carla Gallo as Dingo ("A Date with Destiny")
- Jon Daly as Owl ("A Date with Destiny")
- Will Forte as the voice of CASSIN-E ("The i of the Tiger")
- Kristen Schaal as Screw ("Guess Who's Coming to Lunch")
- Kurtwood Smith as Supreme Overlord General Vise Myrmbeater ("The Binx Ultimatum")
- Laura Baranik as Dasha Ovechkin ("There Will Be Borscht")
- Ami Bejko as Anne Frank ("Haven Is for Real"), a resident of Haven and Jewish teenager saved from Nazis by J1.
- Chala Hunter as Amelia Earhart ("The Land After Time"), a resident of Haven and former pilot rescued from death by J1, and a love interest of Josh's.
- Chris Mark as Bruce Lee ("The Land After Time"), a resident of Haven and former martial artist and actor rescued from death by J1, and a love interest of Josh's.
- Nicolas Grimes as The Killing Machine (season 3), a cyborg clone of the 300 Spartans hunting Wolf, Tiger, and Josh.

== Episodes ==
Season	Episodes	Originally released
1	13	November 14, 2017
2	13	January 11, 2019
3	8	April 3, 2020

=== Season 1 (2017) ===
No. overall	No. in season	Title	Directed by	Written by	Original release date
1	1	"Pilot"	Seth Rogen & Evan Goldberg	Kyle Hunter & Ariel Shaffir	November 14, 2017
Josh Futturman is an unambitious janitor who lives with his parents and spends most of his time playing the video game Biotic Wars. One night, after countless unsuccessful attempts, Josh beats the game's final level, and is labeled an in-game savior. While masturbating to a character in the game known as "Tiger", both Tiger and another character "Wolf" land in his room after time traveling. They explain to Josh that Biotic Wars was used to recruit their potential savior, and after a period of disbelief, they travel back in time to 1969, where Josh encounters younger versions of his family. They soon engage in a fight with a group of bikers, then steal their clothes, that pay homage to Easy Rider, to blend in to their surroundings. The team rides motorcycles they stole from the bikers to a gas station, where Wolf breaks an employee's fingers and Tiger threatens a mother with her infant. Soon, a gunshot set off by Josh causes a police car to arrive and be blown up, killing a cop.
2	2	"Herpe: Fully Loaded"	Seth Rogen & Evan Goldberg	Kyle Hunter & Ariel Shaffir	November 14, 2017
Having jumped back to 1969 with Wolf and Tiger, Josh realizes that it was his old boss in the future who developed the cure for all diseases that would eventually become the Biotics, and they try to get in to the party where Kronish would contract herpes, the diagnosis that would eventually prompt him to become a scientist. Meanwhile, a police officer named Skarsgard begins finding leads on Tiger and Wolf, who have already caused enough trouble around town, including beating up the bikers, threatening a mother, and breaking the fingers of a gas station employee. Josh's awkward attempts to prevent Kronish from contracting herpes edge on annoying. When the police come to apprehend the two characters, a biker gang who the store employee ordered to kill Wolf arrive and they and the police fight. After finishing their mission, the trio return to Pasadena in 2017, but realize that their plan didn't work and Kronish is still a scientist.
3	3	"A Riphole In Time"	Seth Rogen & Evan Goldberg	Henry Alonso Myers	November 14, 2017
Back in the present, Josh tells Tiger and Wolf of his discoveries that the future remains relatively unchanged (except for minor ripples, like Kronish works with his former employee Stu Camilo now, and by showing someone his iPhone in the past, the Blackapple now exists instead of Apple) and Tiger and Wolf reluctantly convince Josh that the only real way to rid the future of the Biotics is to kill Kronish once and for all. Josh sneaks into the lab where he decides that it isn't right to lure Kronish out to his death. Meanwhile, Tiger and Wolf sense that something has gone wrong and enter the building, but destroy the room and steal key cards to find Kronish. Josh finds the destruction and tracks them, then returns to convince Kronish to abandon his research, only to realize that Kronish has already shared it with the world. Tiger and Wolf shoot at Kronish, but they miss and are attacked by Biotics who've traveled to the past as well.
4	4	"A Fuel's Errand"	Anton Cropper	Dan Mirk	November 14, 2017
Josh learns from Tiger and Wolf that the Biotics they fought were humans, sent back from the future to hide in plain sight. They burn the Biotics' bodies and realize that their time travel device is broken and some of its fuel is missing. Tiger and Wolf repair the machine, but turn to Josh to tell them where they can find more fuel. Then, Josh accidentally lets slip that he is only a janitor, and Tiger and Wolf decide it is not worth it to bring him on their mission, and set up base in a sewer. Josh follows them and convinces them to let him back on the team by telling them he can find more fuel. Josh takes them to talk to his friend, Tracy, who works for the video game store. They get the address of her chemist ex-boyfriend and go to talk to him about developing more fuel. The chemist, Lyle, betrays them and steals what little fuel they have left but Wolf saves them. Lyle tries to get away but Josh stops them and gets the fuel back. They resolve to just get another time machine from the Biotics who've traveled to the past. Meanwhile, an older Skarsgard finds Tiger's hair so he can hunt her down for killing his partner.
5	5	"Justice Desserts"	Anton Cropper	Melody Derloshon	November 14, 2017
Josh tells Tiger and Wolf that at the lab's upcoming party, which everyone must attend, so the Biotics will be there too, they will be serving Kronish balls, little chocolate treats. They decide to sneak in so Wolf can replace the normal balls with poisoned ones, with Tiger posing as Josh's date. However, when Josh talks to Kronish, the scientist reveals that the Kronish balls are off the menu this year. Later, Josh grows close to secretary Jeri Lang until Skarsgard arrive looking for Josh, but Lang covers for him. Meanwhile, Gabe teaches Wolf to cook and Diane gets Tiger ready for the party. At the party, Stu finds out about the balls and destroys them all, but is fired by Kronish. Wolf inspires the other cooks to make more balls, but unbeknownst to all, Skarsgard is at the party. Kronish begins a toast and Skarsgard finds Josh and Wolf serves the newly made balls, and everyone becomes sick except the Biotics, who fight the heroes. However, Lang is a Biotic too.
6	6	"A Blowjob Before Dying"	Nisha Ganatra	Ben Karlin	November 14, 2017
Having been captured, Lang activates a self-destruct sequence. They drive back to Josh's house to interrogate Lang to find her time machine, but Diane and Gabe are hosting a party downstairs. Wolf joins the party while Josh and Tiger confront Lang, but get no results. Gabe messes up a recipe, and Wolf agrees to help, while Josh's uncle, Barry spies on them. Lang starts deceiving Josh, saying that Tiger is the bad guy, and then tells Tiger that Josh said that he hated her. Barry begins to grow suspicious of Wolf, who leaves to use the bathroom. While getting a scorpion to use on Lang, Tiger finds one of the guests' babies alone and pretends that it is baby Elias Kronish, and that she will kill it if Lang doesn't cooperate. When Tiger is about to destroy the baby, Josh saves it, revealing that it is just the neighbor's kid. Meanwhile, Josh grows close to Biotic Lang, who reveals that the fuel, Cameronium, was created and named after James Cameron. Barry remembers seeing Wolf in 1969 in episode two. He grabs the rifle from the wall and threatens him and Tiger. Gabe convinces Barry to put the weapon down, and Lang admits that her feelings for Josh were real, but Josh reveals that by pretending to be weak, he got her to tell him everything. Then, Lang's head explodes, killing her.
7	7	"Pandora's Mailbox"	Brandon Trost	Jessica Conrad	November 14, 2017
After Tiger submits some DNA to a site to figure out who her family in this time is, Biotics sneak into Josh's house for his DNA. Josh and Tiger travel to James Cameron's house and are met by Cameron's artificial intelligence, SIGORN-E. While Wolf is impressed by Cameron's great collection of talents and inventions, Tiger and Josh search for SIGORN-E's brain to shut it down. Wolf accidentally slips up and tells SIGORN-E of his true nature, instead of pretending to be a babysitter like he was supposed to be, and Josh cannot name his indentity's mother's name. Wolf warms up to SIGORN-E by letting her vent to him and Josh blows up at Tiger, telling her that he'd rather be a Biotic because this whole thing has gotten out of hand. SIGORN-E tells Wolf that Cameron will be home any minute, and Wolf tells her that they are here to steal Cameronium. Wolf convinces SIGORN-E to let him get at the Cameronium, and Josh and Tiger tag along. They have to dive down into freezing water to get the Cameronium, and since Josh is the only one of the team who can swim, he chooses the get the Cameronium and fix the time machine. Josh nearly dies of hypothermia, but SIGORN-E talks Tiger through performing CPR on Josh, and he comes back with the Cameronium. Tiger then tells Josh that they cannot take him back to the future and Wolf must say goodbye to SIGORN-E.
8	8	"Girth, Wind & Fire"	Nisha Ganatra	Matthew Bass & Theodore Bressman	November 14, 2017
The team notices that some of their body parts have been switched since the Cameronium was unstable. They leave their truck, which is filled with dead Biotic bodies. When is explodes, it starts a fire in a cornfield. Meanwhile, Wolf starts collection things from this time, but Tiger tells him to let it go because this isn't their time and they have no relation to it. Josh returns to work, where he speaks with Kronish, where he learns that the fire is heading for Kronish's house among other things. Josh enjoys his last moments with Kronish, knowing that Wolf and Tiger will kill baby Kronish in the past. The characters return home where the find that Diane was taken by police. They decide to rescue Diane from Skarsgard, who interrogates her. Once they find that Diane isn't Tiger, they let he go, where Josh and the others are waiting for them. Tiger and Wolf prepare to leave with their time machine, they argue about their past crimes, while a police officer spies on them. He goes to tell Skarsgard, who is enthusiastic. Josh's parents convince him to be strong, so he takes their advice. Biotics arrive, and Josh sneaks into the police department to find his friends, to fight the villains. They escape, with both Stu Camillo and Skarsgard on their trail. The trio run into the fire they caused to escape the villains and Skarsgard watches them time travel. However, Tiger and Wolf discover that Josh previously changed the coordinates on their time machine so instead of killing Kronish in the 1940s, they set him on a better path in the 1980s.
9	9	"Operation: Fatal Attraction"	Michael Weaver	Henry Alonso Myers & Dan Mirk	November 14, 2017
Tiger and Wolf get mad at Josh, but he convinces them to go along with his plan. They set it up to reveal to Kronish's wife, Marigold, that he is having an affair, but Tiger deduces that the Biotics will be tracking the time machine, which is with Wolf, and goes to find him. Wolf joins a group of men in volleyball and barbeque. Josh takes pictures of himself dressed up as a lady and leaves them for Marigold to find. However, Marigold's lover arrives and Josh realizes that he is Leslie, the man Kronish is having an affair with. Tiger arrives at the volleyball game, mistaking it for a battle. She finds Wolf's new friends and gets drunk. Kronish has sex with Leslie but Marigold arrives home early. Tiger arrives in their house and Kronish escapes to leave on a boat with Leslie to start a new life. Marigold is initially happy that Kronish is having an affair, with Tiger, she assumes, so she can divorce him. Josh discovers that there is a Biotic in the house, and goes to warn Tiger. Everything goes wrong and Josh is forced to escape before the cops arrive. Tiger tracks down Wolf but he quits the team to live in the 1980s.
10	10	"Operation: Natal Attraction"	Michael Weaver	Henry Alonso Myers & Dan Mirk	November 14, 2017
Tiger blows up at Wolf for leaving the team, but finally lets him leave. Meanwhile, Josh sneaks back into his house, still in 1985, and joins the party downstairs. Tiger sneaks into a Corey Hart concert with a group of girls to find Wolf and Josh gets high with his father's past self, who used to love to party. Josh tries to ensure the future by encouraging his father to marry his future mother and his uncle Barry to apply for a job. Tiger finds Wolf and tries to convince him to rejoin the team peacefully, but he traps Tiger and runs away to destroy the time machine. Josh has sex with one of his father's friends, but after realizing that it is actually his mother, Diane, he vomits and leaves, then tries to force young Kronish on the boat with Leslie at gunpoint, but after he rebels Josh shows him a picture of the two together in the future. Tiger and Wolf fight, and Tiger comes out victorious but Wolf still does not want to return to the future. Kronish gets on the boat of his own free will and Tiger arrives, having killed Wolf in the fight. Alone, Tiger and Josh jump back to 2017, and it is revealed that Tiger didn't kill Wolf, and instead let him stay in the 1980s.
11	11	"Beyond the TruffleDome"	Wendey Stanzler	Kyle Hunter & Ariel Shaffir	November 14, 2017
Tiger and Josh realize that the future has come early and the super cure that was supposed to be developed after Kronish's death has already been created. Tiger travels to the 1940s to kill baby Kronish, however after realizing how cute the baby is and much his mother cares about him, she becomes his nanny for the next three years, until Estelle, Kronish's mother, marries another man and moves in with him, leaving Tiger to fend for herself. However, as soon as she leaves, Tiger realizes that Wolf, now Corey Wolf-Hart, has opened a restaurant where he kidnapped people, told them they were going to die, and them fed them life changing meals and let them go. Four years later, Skarsgard returns having read an article about Wolf, and hunts him down to arrest him. Wolf rids himself of Skarsgard, but when two men make fun of his restaurant he destroys everything and leaves a message for Tiger detailing the past events for her before Skarsgard reappears, and Tiger time travels forward to meet him and beats the detective up.
12	12	"Prelude to an Apocalypse"	Michael Dowse	Ben Karlin	November 14, 2017
Meanwhile, Josh returns to his home where he finds that he is now named Joosh, a name his parents, Gabe and Diane, chose for him after meeting a Joosh (who was really Josh in "Operation: Natal Attraction") and taking a liking to him. His old friends at the video game store, Paul and Tracy, now work for him, and he never played Biotic Wars and was never recruited by Tiger and Wolf. The duo from the future return then, and try to get him to come with them to stop Kronish, however he has grown close to this timeline and chooses to stay. Wolf becomes sick after having too much cocaine and Tiger tracks down Stu, who is kinder and less menacing in this timeline, and Stu comes to like Tiger. Meanwhile, Josh plays video games with his friends and learns that his alter ego goes by JFUTZ. Wolf has nightmares about his friend from the 1980s, Blaze, and Gabe, and all the other people he hurt. Meanwhile, Josh realizes that he went to court to declare his parents mentally incompetent and they hate him for it, which prompts him to beat Biotic Wars again. When he wins, more hunters from Tiger and Wolf's future return to help.
13	13	"A Date with Destiny"	Michael Dowse	Ben Karlin & Nora Winslow	November 14, 2017
Tiger devises a plan to kill Kronish and destroying his lab, then heading back to the future. Josh, at first, does not want to go with them because he wants to make amends with his parents for how his other self treated them, but changes his mind later on. Once they go to the lab, the plan turns out to be a disaster, with Tiger ending up having to set off one of the bombs after Dingo, one of the hunters, figures out that Tiger could had killed Kronish in the past but refused. After Tiger reunites with Josh and Wolf, Josh deduces that the only way to get to Kronish is by going up the incinerator chute where the opossums are put in. Josh volunteers to confront Kronish while Wolf and Tiger hold the Biotic reinforcements off even though Josh might not survive getting down. After saying goodbye to Wolf and Tiger, Josh climbs up the chute and confronts Kronish. Kronish tells Josh that he and Leslie were living the dream they always wanted, until Leslie caught a staph infection, which killed him before Kronish could take him to the nearest hospital which was days away. Josh, who knows that Kronish just wanted to heal the world, convinces Kronish that the army he created from his cure is too dangerous. Kronish, accepting his fate, injects himself with a needle filled with micro-doses of 100 of the worlds deadliest diseases. Kronish and Josh talk about the Kronish Josh used to know, before Kronish passed away. Wolf and Tiger blow up the building and travel back to the future just as Josh barely escapes, who gets arrested by Skarsgard right after. One year later in prison, Josh plays chess with Skarsgard, who is still questioning Josh about his time traveling friends. After he leaves, Josh gets startled by a flashing light in his prison cell.

=== Season 2 (2019) ===
No. overall	No. in season	Title	Directed by	Written by	Original release date
14	1	"Countdown to a Prologue"	Jonathan Watson	Dan Mirk	January 11, 2019
Josh awakens in his house in the new timeline, realizing that he was allowed to go home on house arrest due to spasms and seizures of the brain, even though he is considered a terrorist. When he discovers that he does not have an ankle monitor, he learns that Skarsgard is staying in his house to guard him and to make sure he doesn't leave. When Josh gets flowers from Stu Camillo, Skarsgard and his housekeeper Paul (a video game store owner in the original timeline) question him intensely about Camillo, and Josh realizes that the two are Biotics. Tiger and Wolf arrive and together they learn that the remaining Biotics have teamed up from all around the world to kill him. Tiger and Wolf then begin questioning him about Camillo too, and he realizes that they're Biotics too. Josh awakens to learn that it was all a simulation and a strange group of people all named after gods in different mythologies want to use his body for an experiment. Additionally, Camillo caused the rise of Biotics even after Kronish's death, prompting the group to capture and interrogate Josh about the scientist.
15	2	"The i of the Tiger"	Michael Weaver	Kyle Hunter & Ariel Shaffir	January 11, 2019
Tiger and Wolf arrive in the new future, where they discover a farm of massive beans. They are found by guards from the NAG, or the "New Above Ground" and Wolf is taken in as the people that are there recognize him as Torque; a version of him from another universe. Meanwhile, Tiger is forced from the NAG to wander the desert, and eventually she comes to a base of Biotics, or "Bio-Techs", as they are called in this timeline, training to visit Mars. She meets Stu Camillo there, and realizes that he uploaded his consciousness into a computer to survive for 144 years, and that the war that ended the lives of all Tiger and Wolf's teammates didn't happen because the government refused to administer Elias Kronish's cure to anybody, but instead because they administered the cure only to a small portion of people.
16	3	"A Wolf in the Torque House"	Michael Weaver	Ben Karlin	January 11, 2019
Wolf realizes that he has been mistaken for his own counterpart, 'Torque', but his plans to get away are hindered as he finds himself bonding with his other selves' group spouses and daughter.
17	4	"Guess Who's Coming to Lunch"	Craig Zisk	Jane Becker	January 11, 2019
As Josh struggles to survive in the wastelands, Tiger is increasingly discomfited by her interaction with Ty-Anne, her own counterpart in this timeline.
18	5	"J1: Judgment Day"	Jonathan Watson	Joel Church-Cooper	January 11, 2019
Reunited, the trio attempt to break into the Pointed Circle headquarters to reclaim the TTD, during which Josh is horrified to learn the full extent of their plans for him.
19	6	"The Binx Ultimatum"	Craig Zisk	Nora Winslow	January 11, 2019
As Tiger searches for the TTD, Josh is remanded to a labour camp in the NAG while Wolf tries to suggest change to Supreme Overlord Vise.
20	7	"Homicide: Life in the Mons"	Kevin Bray	Allison Kiessling	January 11, 2019
Wolf brings Josh to his Clusternest while Tiger hits a dead end in her search for the TTD.
21	8	"The Last Horchata"	Tamra Davis	Dan Mirk	January 11, 2019
Tiger becomes won over by Stu's ideas when he draws her into his simulation.
22	9	"The Ballad of PUP-E Q. Barkington"	Kevin Bray	Joel Church-Cooper	January 11, 2019
Bloodshed ensues as Stu sends his forces to take Josh from the NAG while Josh and Wolf learn the identity of the leader of the Pointed Circle.
23	10	"Exes and OS"	Tamra Davis	Jane Becker & Nora Winslow	January 11, 2019
Ty-Anne reveals her full history while raised under Stu, including how she joined the resistance and met Torque.
24	11	"Dia de Los Robots"	Millicent Shelton	Ben Karlin, Kyle Hunter, & Ariel Shaffir	January 11, 2019
On the day of the MARS launch, Josh sneaks into Stu's brain uploader machine to try and shut him down while Tiger learns the full extent of Stu's megalomania.
25	12	"The Brain Job"	Millicent Shelton	Ben Karlin, Kyle Hunter, & Ariel Shaffir	January 11, 2019
With the TTD now in their possession, the trio attempt rapid jumps into the past to use the eleven-second window available to them to shut Stu down for good.
26	13	"Ultra-Max"	Wendey Stanzler	Ben Karlin, Kyle Hunter, & Ariel Shaffir	January 11, 2019
Having messed with time travel too many times, the trio are taken to jail in 3491 and find their loyalty to each other tested by their cruel and unusual jailer, Susan as an entertainer.

=== Season 3 (2020) ===
No. overall	No. in season	Title	Directed by	Written by	Original release date
27	1	"The Precipice of Yesterday"	Jonathan Watson	Ben Karlin	April 3, 2020
Josh, Tiger, and Wolf are forced to compete in the Diecathalon, but a complication arises that puts them at odds with each other.
28	2	"There Will Be Borscht"	Jonathan Watson	Kyle Hunter & Ariel Shaffir	April 3, 2020
Josh puts his faith in The Voice while Wolf basks in his element and Tiger struggles to adapt.
29	3	"Trapper's Delight"	Jonathan Watson	Joel Church-Cooper	April 3, 2020
Josh's crisis of faith comes to a head as Tiger connects with her killer instincts, and Wolf struggles to lie low.
30	4	"The Outlaw Wild Sam Bladden"	Jonathan Watson	Nora Winslow	April 3, 2020
Tiger and Wolf come to terms with their true selves as Josh is forced to confront what and who he truly believes.
31	5	"Haven Is for Real"	Alex Buono	Annie Mebane	April 3, 2020
Tiger and Wolf let Josh take command.
32	6	"The Land After Time"	Alex Buono	Jasmine Chiong	April 3, 2020
Josh discovers a new happiness as Wolf loses his mind and Tiger embarks on an unexpected journey.
33	7	"Time Rogues III: Escape from Forever"	Alex Buono	Kyle Hunter & Ariel Shaffir	April 3, 2020
Josh and Wolf reunite and make a desperate move to escape while Tiger reconciles her past and present selves.
34	8	"Return of the Present"	Jonathan Watson	Ben Karlin	April 3, 2020
The universe is about to end. For real this time.

== Production ==
=== Development ===
On September 9, 2016, it was announced that Hulu had ordered the production to series after reviewing the recently produced pilot. The series order was reported to be for a first season consisting of thirteen episodes. The pilot was written by Ariel Shaffir and Kyle Hunter from a story by the duo and Howard Overman and was directed by Seth Rogen and Evan Goldberg. The series' executive producers include Shaffir, Hunter, Rogen, Goldberg and James Weaver. On January 8, 2018, it was announced that Hulu had renewed the series for a second season consisting of thirteen episodes. On October 1, 2018, it was announced that the second season would premiere on January 11, 2019. On April 9, 2019, it was reported that Hulu renewed the series for a third and final season which premiered on April 3, 2020.

=== Casting ===
On February 17, 2016, it was announced that Josh Hutcherson had been cast in the television pilot's lead role. A week later, it was reported that Eliza Coupe had also been cast in a main role. On March 7, 2016, it was announced that Glenne Headly and Ed Begley Jr. had joined the main cast as Hutcherson's character's parents. On May 2, 2016, Derek Wilson joined the production in a main role. In April 2017, it was reported that Patrick Carlyle and Robert Craighead had been cast in recurring roles.

On June 28, 2018, it was announced that Shaun Brown had joined the cast in a recurring capacity. On July 17, 2018, it was reported that Sara Amini and Rati Gupta had been cast in recurring roles. In August 2018, it was announced that Tim Johnson Jr., Jade Catta-Preta, and Timothy Hornor had also been cast in recurring roles.

=== Filming ===
On June 8, 2017, cast member Glenne Headly died after she filmed five episodes of the planned 13-episode season order. Producers stated that she would not be recast and that the episodes she filmed will air, leaving the writers with the need to rework the episodes she was due to feature in.

== Release ==
In the US Future Man streams on Hulu. As of 2022, Future Man was available to stream on Disney+ internationally in selected territories via the Star hub, as a part of the 2021 Disney/Sony deal which covers shows from Sony Pictures Television. All 3 seasons of Future Man were later removed from Hulu, Disney+ and Star+ due to Disney's budget cuts.

== Reception ==
On Rotten Tomatoes, season 1 has an approval rating of 82% based on 39 reviews, with an average rating of 7.08 out of 10. The website's critical consensus reads, "Future Man's nostalgia-driven premise is elevated by the cast's compelling chemistry and a sense of humor just dumb enough to lighten the sci-fi load." On Metacritic season 1 has a weighted average score of 70 out of 100 based on reviews from 20 critics, indicating "generally favorable reviews". Alex McLevy of The A.V. Club praises the committed performances, the "gleefully ludicrous nonsense", and that "If it figures out the proper tone and blend of stupid-smart jokes with its game cast, the series could potentially travel forward to a time when it becomes a great sci-fi comedy."

On Rotten Tomatoes, season 2 has an approval rating of 100% based on 9 reviews, with an average rating of 8.03 out of 10. Adam Chitwood of Collider wrote: "Future Man's strength as a series has been the writers' willingness to take the sci-fi seriously, and indeed there are times when you almost want the joke to be done so you can find out what happens next in the story."

On Rotten Tomatoes, season 3 has 3 positive reviews. Alex McLevy of The A.V. Club wrote: "Future Man finds a decent denouement to close out its triptych of seasons, and those who enjoyed past installments won’t be let down by this one. If only all that traveling through space and time could have found a more richly developed series." Adam Chitwood of Collider called it "a little disappointing but not inessential", adding that although it will not convince those who never got into the show to check it out, it should satisfy fans of the series.

=== Awards and nominations ===
In 2018, Future Man was nominated for Best New Media Superhero Series at the 44th Saturn Awards.

== Home media ==
Season	Release date (Australia)		# Discs		ACB rating	More	Ref(s)
Season	DVD (Region 4)	Blu-ray (Region B)	DVD	Blu-ray	ACB rating	More	Ref(s)
Season 1	2 January 2019		3	2	MA15+	Via Vision (distributor); 390 minutes; English Dolby Digital 2.0 (DVD); English Dolby TrueHD 5.1 (Blu-ray); No subtitles	
Season 2	7 August 2019		3	2	MA15+	Via Vision (distributor); 390 minutes; English Dolby Digital 2.0 (DVD); English Dolby Dolby Digital 5.1 (Blu-ray); English LPCM 2.0 (Blu-ray); No subtitles	
Season 3	16 September 2020		2	2	MA15+	Via Vision (distributor); 240 minutes; Audio TBA; Subtitles TBA	

== See also ==
- List of original programs distributed by Hulu
- Action comedy TV series
