= This Is the End =

2013 film by Seth Rogen and Evan Goldberg

- Theatrical release poster
- Directed by: Seth Rogen; Evan Goldberg
- Written by: Seth Rogen; Evan Goldberg
- Based on: Jay and Seth Versus the Apocalypse by Jason Stone
- Produced by: Seth Rogen; Evan Goldberg; James Weaver
- Starring: James Franco; Jonah Hill; Seth Rogen; Jay Baruchel; Danny McBride; Craig Robinson; Michael Cera; Emma Watson
- Cinematography: Brandon Trost
- Edited by: Zene Baker
- Music by: Henry Jackman
- Production companies: Columbia Pictures; Mandate Pictures; Point Grey Pictures
- Distributed by: Sony Pictures Releasing
- Release dates: June 3, 2013 (Fox Village Theater); June 12, 2013 (United States)
- Running time: 107 minutes
- Country: United States
- Language: English
- Budget: $32–41.9 million
- Box office: $127 million

This Is the End is a 2013 American comedy horror film written, directed and produced by Seth Rogen and Evan Goldberg in their directorial debuts. It is a feature-length film adaptation of Rogen and Goldberg's 2007 short film Jay and Seth Versus the Apocalypse, with the short's director, Jason Stone, serving as an executive producer on the film. Starring James Franco, Jonah Hill, Rogen, Jay Baruchel, Danny McBride, Craig Robinson, Michael Cera and Emma Watson, the film centers on fictionalized versions of its cast attempting to survive a global biblical apocalypse in Los Angeles.

Produced by Mandate Pictures and Rogen and Goldberg's Point Grey Pictures, This Is the End premiered at the Fox Village Theater on June 3, 2013, before being released theatrically in the United States on June 12, 2013 by Sony Pictures Releasing, via its Columbia Pictures label. The film received generally positive reviews from critics, who praised its humor and the six leads' chemistry. It was also a commercial success, having grossed $127 million worldwide against a budget of $32–41.9 million.

== Plot ==
In Los Angeles, Jay Baruchel visits Seth Rogen, who invites him to a housewarming party hosted by James Franco. At the party, Jay feels uncomfortable, so he and Seth visit a convenience store where a rapture suddenly occurs. Seth and Jay flee back to James's house and find the party unharmed. An earthquake then strikes and the crowd rushes outside, where a sinkhole opens up in James's yard. Several celebrities and partygoers are killed as Seth, Jay, James, Jonah Hill and Craig Robinson run back inside and learn on the news that the earthquake has devastated most of the city. They take inventory of their supplies, set up a ration system, board up the house and await help.

The next morning, Danny McBride, who crashed the party last night and is unaware of the crisis, wakes up first and wastes most of the group's sustenance. He disbelieves what the others tell him of the previous night's events until a man outside gets decapitated by an unseen creature. Tensions rise due to various conflicts, including Jay and Seth's growing estrangement and the others' skepticism of the former's belief that the disaster might be the Apocalypse predicted in the Book of Revelation. Emma Watson makes her way back to James's house, but leaves with the group's remaining drinks after misinterpreting an overheard conversation, thinking they intend to rape her.

Craig attempts to obtain water from James's cellar, only to find the doors locked. He then encounters another unseen creature, causing him to believe Jay's theory. Jay and Seth dig through the floor and find water, but Danny wastes most of it out of spite, prompting the others to kick him out. Before leaving, Danny reveals Jay was in town two months prior, but stayed at a hotel instead of with Seth due to their strained relationship. That night, Jonah prays for Jay to die and is possessed by a demon. While scavenging for supplies in an abandoned house next door, Craig and Jay are chased by a demon while Seth and James are attacked by the possessed Jonah, before Craig and Jay return and help subdue Jonah by tying him to James's bed. During an exorcism, Jay and Seth fight and knock over a candle, starting a fire that engulfs Jonah and the house, and forces the others outside.

When a demon lands in front of James's car, Craig volunteers to sacrifice himself to help the others get into the car and is raptured into Heaven, causing the others to realize they can save themselves by performing a selfless act. While driving, James decides to take Seth and Jay to his home in Malibu before encountering a group of cannibals led by Danny and an enslaved Channing Tatum. James offers to sacrifice himself and a rapture occurs, only to get cancelled after he taunts Danny. James is eaten alive by Danny and his cannibals while Seth and Jay escape and encounter Satan. Jay apologizes to Seth for his wrongdoings, whereupon a rapture only ensnares him. Jay takes Seth with him, but Seth's presence prevents them from reaching Heaven together. Seth tells Jay to leave him behind, after which he is saved by another rapture and the two reconcile as they enter Heaven. Seth and Jay reunite with Craig, who tells them about Heaven's instant wish fulfillment. After Jay wishes for the Backstreet Boys, the band performs "Everybody (Backstreet's Back)" for a celebration.

== Cast ==
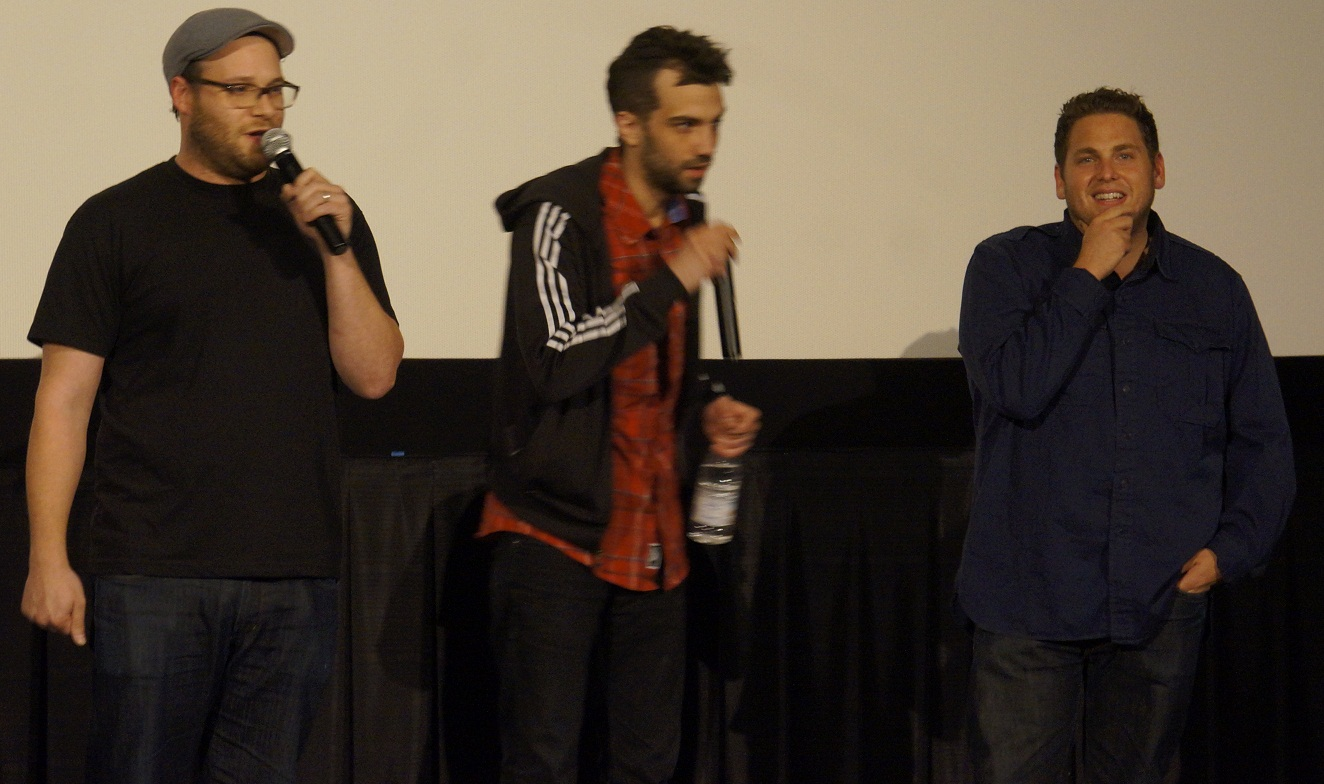
Seth Rogen, Jay Baruchel and Jonah Hill at a screening of the film in 2013.

Most of the film's cast portray fictionalized and exaggerated versions of themselves:

- James Franco
- Jonah Hill
- Seth Rogen
- Jay Baruchel
- Danny McBride
- Craig Robinson
- Michael Cera
- Emma Watson
- Mindy Kaling
- David Krumholtz
- Christopher Mintz-Plasse
- Rihanna
- Martin Starr
- Paul Rudd
- Channing Tatum
- Kevin Hart
- Aziz Ansari
- Backstreet Boys
  - Nick Carter
  - Howie Dorough
  - Brian Littrell
  - AJ McLean
  - Kevin Richardson
- Evan Goldberg (uncredited)
- Jason Segel (uncredited)
- Bentley Stingley (uncredited)

Brian Huskey portrays a survivor who attempts to enter James's home and Ricky Mabe appears as one of Danny's cannibals, dressed as Santa Claus. Jason Trost, the brother of the film's cinematographer Brandon Trost, makes an uncredited appearance as JTRO, a character Trost previously portrayed in The FP, who is depicted in the film as one of Danny's cannibals.

== Production ==
=== Development ===
We always wanted to do a movie where people played themselves and something extraordinary happened; the initial version of this movie was Seth Rogen and Busta Rhymes were filming a music video and a movie respectively, on the Sony lot, and Antmen attacked from the center of the earth.

We had a separate idea with Jason Stone about this short video about the apocalypse. We thought that we should combine these ideas, so we thought we'd do a film with Seth and all of our friends instead of Busta Rhymes. No disrespect to Busta Rhymes. Flipmode Squad is cool as hell in our books.
– Seth Rogen and Evan Goldberg, 2013

This Is the End was based on Jay and Seth Versus the Apocalypse, a short film written by Seth Rogen, Evan Goldberg and Jason Stone, and directed by Stone in 2007. Goldberg explained the influences surrounding the film: "If you drilled down to the core of what I do, it's just ripping off little bits of Charlie Kaufman. Seth and I always loved The Larry Sanders Show too. And the popularity of reality television now also feeds into that idea of whether what we're watching is actually real. We thought working with our friends in that situation would be awesome because they're all comedians willing to take stabs at themselves." The actors play fictionalized and exaggerated versions of themselves in the film.

The film's working title was The Apocalypse, which was later changed to The End of the World. On December 20, 2012, a day before the Mayan prediction of the apocalypse, the title was changed to This Is the End upon the release of the first teaser trailer and poster. This was done at the request of Rogen's Paul costar Simon Pegg, who wrote to Rogen in concern that The End of the World was similar to his own comedy film The World's End, which was also released in the summer of 2013 and centered around an apocalypse with an ensemble cast. As The World's End was also the name of a key location in that film, Pegg was concerned that he could not change the title of his film.

=== Filming ===
While This Is the End is set in Los Angeles, principal photography took place in New Orleans due to financial incentives from that city. Filming rolled from February to early July 2012. The film had a production budget of $42 million, with $32 million spent in Louisiana. Modus FX created over 240 visual effects for the film, such as natural disasters, set extensions for James Franco's house, computer-generated demons and the rapture beams. After filming wrapped, Rogen and Goldberg were dissatisfied with their ending; they considered putting Morgan Freeman in Heaven, but he declined. Since "Everybody (Backstreet's Back)" already played in an earlier scene and Rogen and Goldberg wanted to close on an over-the-top note, they decided to feature the Backstreet Boys in the scene instead.

During filming, Emma Watson left the set due to scenes being improvised that she felt uncomfortable with, such as the progression of the graphic nature of the scenes involving Danny McBride as a cannibal and Channing Tatum as his sex slave. Rogen confirmed this, stating it was "an overall shitty situation, and it must've been hard for her to say something", elaborating "I'm very sorry and disappointed it happened, and I wish I had done more to prevent it."

In a May 2023 interview, Jay Baruchel revealed that the onscreen depiction of his difficulties with Jonah Hill in the film were not entirely fictional: "Not telling tales out of school, I don't think, Jonah and I don't get along super well, or at least didn't back then."

== Music ==
This Is the End: Original Motion Picture Soundtrack was released on June 11, 2013, by RCA Records.

=== Score ===
The film score by Henry Jackman, with additional material by Dominic Lewis and Matthew Margeson and conducted by Nick Glennie-Smith, was not officially released on its own, not even as bonus tracks on the CD or digital releases on RCA's album. Despite that, a promotional album for the score does exist, according to Soundtrack.net. Jackman took heavy influence from the music of The Omen while writing the score.

== Release ==
On April 1, 2013, Sony released a fake trailer for Pineapple Express 2, which was actually a teaser trailer for This Is the End and later shown in the film itself. According to Rogen and Goldberg, the homemade Pineapple Express 2 film in This Is the End depicts what they envision for an actual sequel. On June 7, MTV released a promotional video featuring the main cast of the film in character, in an alternate scenario in which they are roommates with two members of The Real World: Portland during the apocalypse.

The film was rated R for "crude and sexual content throughout, brief graphic nudity, pervasive language, drug use and some violence" by the Motion Picture Association of America; this rating shocked both Rogen and Goldberg, who expected an adults-only NC-17 rating for the film. Goldberg stated that "all the ratings stuff doesn't make sense in the first place, but this is like ludicrous". Rogen commented, "We actually made it even a little worse than we wanted and that [original] version got approved. Insanely, [we] didn't have a ratings issue."

Sony re-released the film in 2,000 theaters across the United States on September 6, 2013.

=== Home media ===
The film was released on DVD and Blu-ray on October 1, 2013. It was the last film to be rented by Blockbuster Video before they went out of business at 11:00 PM on November 9, 2013.

The Blu-ray release fully contains the original short film it was based on, Jay and Seth Versus the Apocalypse, as a special feature.

== Reception ==
=== Box office ===
This Is the End grossed $101 million in North America and $25 million in other territories for a worldwide total of $127 million, against a production budget of $32–41.9 million. It made a net profit of $50 million, when factoring together all expenses and revenues for the film.

The film was released in the United States on June 12, 2013 and was projected to open to around $12 million from 3,055 theaters. The film made $7.8 million on its first day and went on to debut to $20.7 million in its opening weekend (a five-day total of $33 million), finishing second at the box office behind Man of Steel ($116.6 million). In its second weekend it grossed $13.3 million, dropping to 4th.

=== Critical response ===
On Rotten Tomatoes, the film has an approval rating of 82% based on 224 reviews, with an average rating of 7.1/10. The site's critical consensus reads, "Energetic, self-deprecating performances and enough guffaw-inducing humor make up for the flaws in This Is the End's loosely written script." On Metacritic, the film has a weighted average score of 67 out of 100, based on 41 critics, indicating "generally favorable reviews". Audiences polled by CinemaScore gave the film an average grade of "B+" on an A+ to F scale.

Owen Gleiberman of Entertainment Weekly gave the film an "A" grade, saying, "You could sit through a year's worth of Hollywood comedies and still not see anything that's genuinely knock-your-socks-off audacious. But This Is the End . . truly is. It's the wildest screen comedy in a long time and also the smartest, the most fearlessly inspired and the snort-out-loud funniest." Brian D. Johnson of Maclean's gave the film a positive review, writing, "There could be worse ways to experience the apocalypse than with a party of stoned celebrities at James Franco's house. For one thing, his epic art collection can be used to board up the cracking walls against demons and zombies. That's the screwball scenario of This Is the End...The film unfolds as a profanely funny showbiz parody. But with perfect timing, it also sends up a genre that has recently gone viral at the multiplex: the apoca-blockbuster."

Rick Groen of The Globe and Mail gave the film one-and-a-half stars out of five, comparing the film to the interminable wait for a cancelled bus and referring to the actors in the film as "the lazy, the privileged and the mirthless".

== Future ==
When asked whether a sequel to the film was probable, Goldberg replied, "If you ask me, I'd say there's a pretty good chance of a sequel. If you ask Seth Rogen, he'd say no." In June 2013, Goldberg revealed some ideas for a sequel in which the apocalypse occurs at the premiere of the first film. "Seth's a cokehead in this version, Michael Cera is a calm dude with a boyfriend, Rihanna and The Backstreet Boys are back," Goldberg stated in an interview. "We have a lot of ideas: a heaven and hell for example and a Garden of Eden version where Danny [McBride] is Adam." Despite this, Goldberg also said that it would be difficult to recreate the casting conditions from the first film due to different schedules, believing them to be a stroke of luck: "I honestly don't know if we could get the guys together [again]." In May 2014, Rogen posted an update on Twitter about a potential sequel, saying, "I don't think we'll make a sequel to This Is the End, but if we did, it would be called No, THIS Is the End."

== Attraction ==
This Is the End was adapted into a 3D maze titled This Is the End 3D for Halloween Horror Nights at Universal Studios Hollywood in 2015, two years after the film's release. The maze served as the event's first comedy horror-based attraction.

== See also ==
- List of films featuring fictional films
- List of films that most frequently use the word fuck
- It's a Disaster, a 2012 black comedy film about couples at a brunch realizing that the world is ending
- Rapture-Palooza, another 2013 apocalypse-themed comedy film starring Craig Robinson
