= Evan Goldberg =

Canadian screenwriter (born 1982)

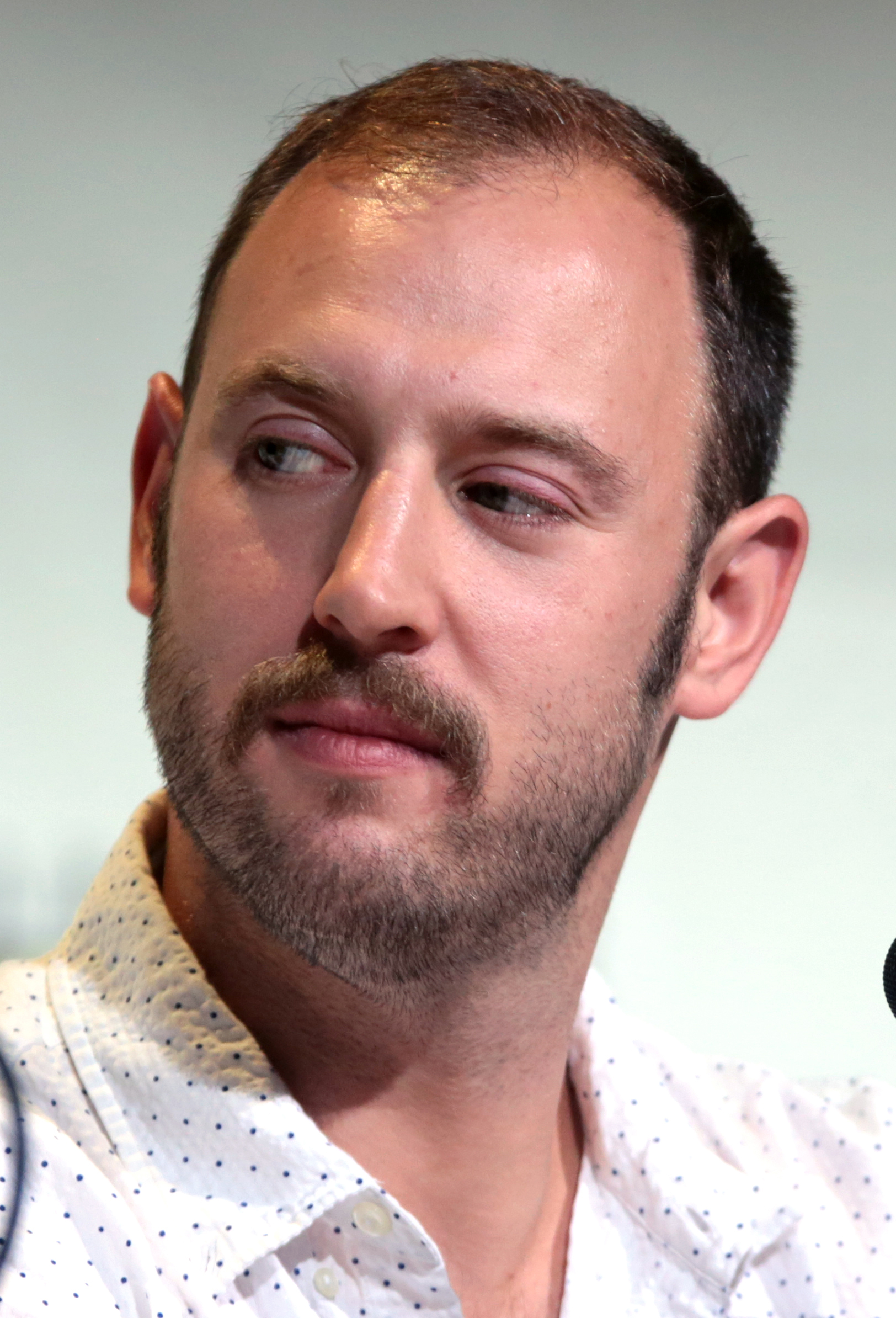
- Goldberg at the 2016 San Diego Comic-Con
- Born: Evan D. Goldberg; September 15, 1982 (age 44); Vancouver, British Columbia, Canada
- Citizenship: Canada
- Occupations: Screenwriter; producer; director
- Years active: 2004–present
- Notable work: Superbad; Pineapple Express; This Is the End; The Interview; Sausage Party; Good Boys; Teenage Mutant Ninja Turtles: Mutant Mayhem
- Title: Co-founder and co-CEO of Point Grey Pictures; Co-founder of Houseplant
- Spouse: Lisa Yadavaia

Evan D. Goldberg (born September 15, 1982) is a Canadian filmmaker. He has collaborated with his childhood friend Seth Rogen on a variety of films and television series, including Superbad, Pineapple Express, This Is the End, The Interview, Sausage Party, Good Boys, Teenage Mutant Ninja Turtles: Mutant Mayhem, and Apple TV+ satirical comedy series The Studio, for which he earned three Primetime Emmy Awards. Goldberg and Rogen launched the cannabis company Houseplant in Canada in 2019.

== Early life ==
Goldberg was born on September 15, 1982, in Vancouver, British Columbia, to a Jewish family. Raised in Marpole, he attended Point Grey Secondary School where he would meet and befriend comedian Seth Rogen. He would also attend McGill University.

== Career ==
Goldberg started his writing career joining the staff of Da Ali G Show for its 2004 season, along with his childhood friend and comedy partner Seth Rogen. They collaborated on the films, Knocked Up, Superbad, Pineapple Express, Funny People, and The Green Hornet with their production company Point Grey Pictures, named after Point Grey Secondary School.

In a strategy to garner interest and funding, Goldberg created a pre-production trailer for Jay and Seth Versus the Apocalypse, which was later made as This Is the End, and was released in June 2013.

During the time, both Rogen and Goldberg through his Point Grey Pictures company had set up a joint venture with major client Good Universe to set up mainstream comedy films.

Goldberg and Rogen are both "obsessed" fans of The Simpsons. After learning that The Simpsons executive producer James L. Brooks was a fan of Superbad, they decided to ask the producers of the show if they could write an episode. They were invited to The Simpsons writers room, where they pitched several episode ideas. One was accepted, and they wrote an outline with the help of some feedback from the regular writers. It became the episode "Homer the Whopper," which was the season premiere of season twenty-one. Goldberg has a chapter giving advice in Tim Ferriss book Tools of Titans.

== Personal life ==
He is married to Lisa (Yadavaia) Goldberg.

== Filmography ==
=== Film ===
Year	Title	Director	Writer	Producer	Notes
2007	Jay and Seth Versus the Apocalypse	No	Yes	Yes	Short film
2007	Superbad	No	Yes	Executive	
2008	Pineapple Express	No	Yes	Executive	
2011	The Green Hornet	No	Yes	Executive	
2011	Goon	No	Yes	No	
2012	The Watch	No	Yes	No	
2013	This Is the End	Yes	Yes	Yes	Co-directed with Seth Rogen
2014	The Interview	Yes	Story	Yes	Co-directed with Seth Rogen
2015	The Night Before	No	Yes	Yes	
2016	Neighbors 2: Sorority Rising	No	Yes	Yes	
2016	Sausage Party	No	Yes	Yes	
2017	Bananas Town	Yes	No	No	Co-directed with Seth Rogen, Short film
2017	Dumpster Diving	Yes	No	No	Co-directed with Seth Rogen, Short film
2023	Teenage Mutant Ninja Turtles: Mutant Mayhem	No	Yes	Yes	

Producer only

- 50/50 (2011)
- The Guilt Trip (2012)
- Neighbors (2014)
- The Disaster Artist (2017)
- Blockers (2018)
- Long Shot (2019)
- Good Boys (2019)
- An American Pickle (2020)
- Joy Ride (2023)
- Cobweb (2023)
- Miller's Girl (2024)
- Teenage Mutant Ninja Turtles: Chrome Alone 2 – Lost in New Jersey (short film) (2025)
- 4 Kids Walk Into a Bank (2027)
- Untitled Teenage Mutant Ninja Turtles: Mutant Mayhem sequel (2027)
- The Wrong Girls (2026)

Executive producer only

- Knocked Up (2007)
- Funny People (2009)
- Goon: Last of the Enforcers (2017)

=== Television ===
Year	Title	Director	Writer	Executive Producer	Notes
2004	Da Ali G Show	No	Yes	No	6 episodes
2009	The Simpsons	No	Yes	No	Episode: "Homer the Whopper"
2016–2019	Preacher	Yes	Yes	Yes	Co-Developer; Directed 4 episodes Story written episode: "Pilot"
2017	Future Man	Yes	No	Yes	Directed 3 episodes
2019–2021	Black Monday	Yes	No	Yes	Directed episode: "365"
2019–2026	The Boys	No	No	Yes	
2021–present	Invincible	No	No	Yes	
2021	Santa Inc.	No	No	Yes	Voice artist for 3 episodes
2022	Pam & Tommy	No	No	Yes	
2022	The Boys Presents: Diabolical	No	Yes	Yes	Co-Developer; Episode: "Laser Baby's Day Out"
2023	Paul T. Goldman	No	No	Yes	
2023–2025	Gen V	No	Yes	Yes	Co-Developer; Episode: "God U."
2024	The Great Canadian Pottery Throw Down	No	No	Yes	
2024	Sausage Party: Foodtopia	No	Yes	Yes	Co-Developer; Episode: "First Course"
2024–2025	Tales of the Teenage Mutant Ninja Turtles	No	No	Yes	
2025	The Studio	Yes	Yes	Yes	
2026	The Muppet Show	No	No	Yes	Television special
TBA	Darkwing Duck	No	No	Yes	Reboot; Co-developer
TBA	TaleSpin	No	No	Yes	Reboot; Co-developer

== Awards and nominations ==
Year	Award	Category	Film	Result	Notes
2005	Primetime Emmy Awards	Outstanding Writing for a Variety, Music or Comedy Program	Da Ali G Show	Nominated	Shared with Seth Rogen and other writing staff
2008	Canadian Comedy Awards	Best Writing – Film	Superbad	Won	Shared with Seth Rogen
2012	Golden Globe Awards	Best Motion Picture – Musical or Comedy	50/50	Nominated	Shared with Seth Rogen and Ben Karlin
2012	Independent Spirit Awards	Best Feature Film	50/50	Nominated	Shared with Seth Rogen and Ben Karlin
2013	Canadian Screen Awards	Best Screenplay	Goon	Nominated	Shared with Jay Baruchel
2021	Primetime Emmy Awards	Outstanding Drama Series	The Boys	Nominated	Shared with producers
2022	Primetime Emmy Awards	Outstanding Limited or Anthology Series	Pam & Tommy	Nominated	Shared with producers
2022	Primetime Emmy Awards	Outstanding Short Form Animated Program	The Boys Presents: Diabolical	Nominated	Shared with producers
2024	Annie Awards	Outstanding Achievement for Writing in an Animated Feature Production	Teenage Mutant Ninja Turtles: Mutant Mayhem	Nominated	Shared with Seth Rogen, Jeff Rowe, Dan Hernandez and Benji Samit
2025	Canadian Screen Awards	Best Reality/Competition Program or Series	The Great Canadian Pottery Throw Down	Nominated	Shared with Seth Rogen and other producers
2025	Astra TV Awards	Best Directing in a Comedy Series	The Studio	Won	Shared with Seth Rogen
2025	Astra TV Awards	Best Writing in a Comedy Series	The Studio	Nominated	Shared with Seth Rogen, Peter Huyck, Alex Gregory, and Frida Perez
2025	Primetime Emmy Awards	Outstanding Comedy Series	The Studio	Won	Shared with Seth Rogen and other producers
2025	Primetime Emmy Awards	Outstanding Directing for a Comedy Series	The Studio	Won	Shared with Seth Rogen
2025	Primetime Emmy Awards	Outstanding Writing for a Comedy Series	The Studio	Won	Shared with Seth Rogen, Peter Huyck, Alex Gregory, and Frida Perez
2026	Primetime Emmy Awards	Outstanding Variety Special (Pre-Recorded)	The Muppet Show	Won	Shared with Seth Rogen and other producers

== See also ==
- List of celebrities who own cannabis businesses
