= Seth Rogen =

Canadian actor, comedian, and filmmaker (born 1982)

- Seth Rogen at the 2026 Toronto International Film Festival
- Born: Seth Aaron Rogen; April 15, 1982 (age 44); Vancouver, British Columbia, Canada
- Citizenship: Canada; United States
- Occupations: Actor; comedian; writer; producer; director; entrepreneur
- Years active: 1999–present
- Works: Filmography
- Title: Co-founder and co-CEO of Point Grey Pictures; Co-founder of Houseplant
- Spouse: Lauren Miller (m. 2011)
- Awards: Full list

Seth Aaron Rogen (/ˈroʊɡən/ ROH-gən; born April 15, 1982) is a Canadian actor, comedian, filmmaker, and cannabis entrepreneur. Known primarily for his comedic leading man roles in films and on television, he has often collaborated with his writing partner, Evan Goldberg, and filmmaker and producer Judd Apatow. Rogen has received various accolades including five Primetime Emmy Awards, two Actor Awards, a Golden Globe Award, a Producers Guild of America Award, a Writers Guild of America Award, and a Directors Guild of America Award.

Born and raised in Vancouver, Rogen moved to Los Angeles as a teenager to act in Freaks and Geeks (1999). He then wrote for the final season of Da Ali G Show (2004), earning a Primetime Emmy Award nomination. After his film debut in Donnie Darko (2001), he solidified himself as a comedy star with The 40-Year-Old Virgin (2005), Knocked Up (2007) and Funny People (2009). He also acted in Superbad (2007), Pineapple Express (2008), Zack and Miri Make a Porno (2008), The Green Hornet (2011), This Is the End (2013), The Interview (2014), Neighbors (2014), its 2016 sequel, The Disaster Artist (2017), and Long Shot (2019). (Note: Rogen also directed This Is the End and The Interview) He took dramatic roles in 50/50 (2011), Take This Waltz (2011), Steve Jobs (2015), The Fabelmans (2022), and The Invite (2026).

Rogen has co-developed the AMC television series Preacher (2016–2019), on which he also served as writer, executive producer and director. He has also executive produced the Amazon Prime Video superhero series The Boys from 2019 and its spin-offs The Boys Presents: Diabolical, Gen V, and Vought Rising, and Invincible from 2021. He also starred in the Hulu miniseries Pam & Tommy (2022) for which he received Primetime Emmy and Golden Globe Award for Best Supporting Actor nominations. He is currently starring in the critically acclaimed Apple TV+ satirical comedy series The Studio (2025–present), which he created, wrote, and directed alongside Goldberg, for which he earned four Primetime Emmy Awards for acting, producing, directing, and writing.

Rogen is also known for his voice roles in the animated films Shrek the Third (2007), Horton Hears a Who! (2008), the Kung Fu Panda series (2008–2024), The Spiderwick Chronicles (2008), Monsters vs. Aliens (2009), Sausage Party (2016), (Note: which he also co-wrote and produced) The Lion King (2019), The Super Mario Bros. Movie (2023), Teenage Mutant Ninja Turtles: Mutant Mayhem (2023), Animal Farm (2025) and Mufasa: The Lion King (2024).

== Early life ==
Seth Aaron Rogen was born on April 15, 1982, in Vancouver, British Columbia, into a Jewish family of Ukrainian and Russian origin. His mother, Sandy Belogus, is a social worker, and his American father, Mark Rogen, worked for non-profit organizations and as an assistant director of the Workmen's Circle Jewish fraternal organization. Rogen is a dual citizen of Canada and the United States who once said "I definitely associate with being Canadian much more than being American" due to his upbringing in the former. He has described his parents, who met on kibbutz Beit Alfa in Israel, as "radical Jewish socialists". Rogen has an older sister named Danya. He attended Vancouver Talmud Torah Elementary School and Point Grey Secondary School, incorporating many of his classmates into his writing, and took up kyokushin karate for 10 years. He was also known for the stand-up comedy he performed at Camp Miriam, a Habonim Dror camp.

As a child, Rogen did not want to pursue any career other than comedy, stating, "As soon as I realized you could be funny as a job, that was the job I wanted." He got his start in show business at age 12 after enrolling in a comedy workshop taught by Mark Pooley. His early comedy routines involved jokes about his bar mitzvah, his grandparents and his camp counsellors. As a teenager, he would perform stand-up comedy routines at places like bar mitzvahs and small parties, later shifting to bars. A mohel paid him to write jokes. At the age of 13, he co-wrote a rough draft of Superbad with childhood friend Evan Goldberg, whom he had met at bar mitzvah classes. Based on their teenage experiences, Rogen and Goldberg spent the rest of their time in high school polishing the script. They initially worried that American Pie (1999) had beaten them to the idea for the movie, but they decided that the film "'managed to totally avoid all honest interaction between characters,' which is what we're going for."

His mother was supportive of his comic endeavours and would often drive him to stand-up gigs at the comedy club Yuk Yuk's. With his deadpan humour, he placed second in the Vancouver Amateur Comedy Contest at 16 years old. Also when Rogen was 16, his father lost his job and his mother quit hers, forcing them to put their house up for sale and relocate to a significantly smaller apartment. Around this time, he landed a role on Judd Apatow's television show Freaks and Geeks after attending a local casting call. Rogen dropped out of high school, began working for Apatow and relocated with his family to Los Angeles. Rogen paid the bills and had become the main wage earner at just 16.

== Career ==
=== 1999–2006: Early work and friendship with Judd Apatow ===
Rogen's acting debut was as Ken Miller, a cynical, acerbic "freak" in Freaks and Geeks, an eventual cult hit series first released in 1999. Revolving around a group of teenagers' lives, Freaks and Geeks first aired in 1999 and was well reviewed. The show was NBC's lowest-viewed program and was cancelled after one season due to poor ratings. Impressed with Rogen's improvisational skills, Apatow then chose him as the lead in another of his shows, Undeclared. Rogen was originally set to play a fairly popular college freshman, but the network did not think he was leading man material. Apatow opted not to go along with the show. Rogen also served as a staff writer to the short-lived production.

Following the show's cancellation in 2002, Rogen did not get many auditions, which was not upsetting to him, as he always thought he would achieve better success as a writer. He became part of Apatow's "frat pack", a close-knit group that included Steve Carell and Paul Rudd. Of the awkwardness of a grown man spending so much time with a teenaged Rogen, Apatow said, "I'm such a comedy fan that, even though he's 16, I know I'm hanging out with one of the guys who's going to be one of the great comics." To stimulate their creativity, Apatow gave Rogen and Goldberg unusual writing tasks, such as turning an idea of his into a movie in 10 days, and coming up with 100 one-page film ideas. Regarding Apatow's professional effect on him, Rogen said in 2009, "Obviously, I can't stress how important Judd's been to my career."

Rogen had roles in Donnie Darko (2001) and Anchorman: The Legend of Ron Burgundy (2004). A big career point for him was becoming a staff writer for Sacha Baron Cohen's last season of Da Ali G Show in 2004. Along with the show's other writers, Rogen received a Primetime Emmy Award nomination. He became familiar to audiences as one of the main character's co-workers in Apatow's well-reviewed buddy comedy directorial debut feature The 40-Year-Old Virgin (2005), which Rogen also co-produced, and in which he improvised all his dialogue. "[Rogen] hadn't done any screen work that indicated he could carry as memorable and convincing a performance as he does with the character Cal," MTV's John Constantine wrote. The Boston Globe reviewer Wesley Morris wrote that Rogen, along with co-stars Rudd and Romany Malco, were each hilarious in their own right. The Orlando Sentinel's Roger Moore believed that Rogen "had his moments" in the film, whereas Moira Macdonald of The Seattle Times said the actor was "droopily deadpan". Rogen followed this with a small role in You, Me and Dupree (2006), a critically panned comedy featuring Matt Dillon, Kate Hudson and Owen Wilson.

=== 2007–2009: Breakthrough as a leading man ===
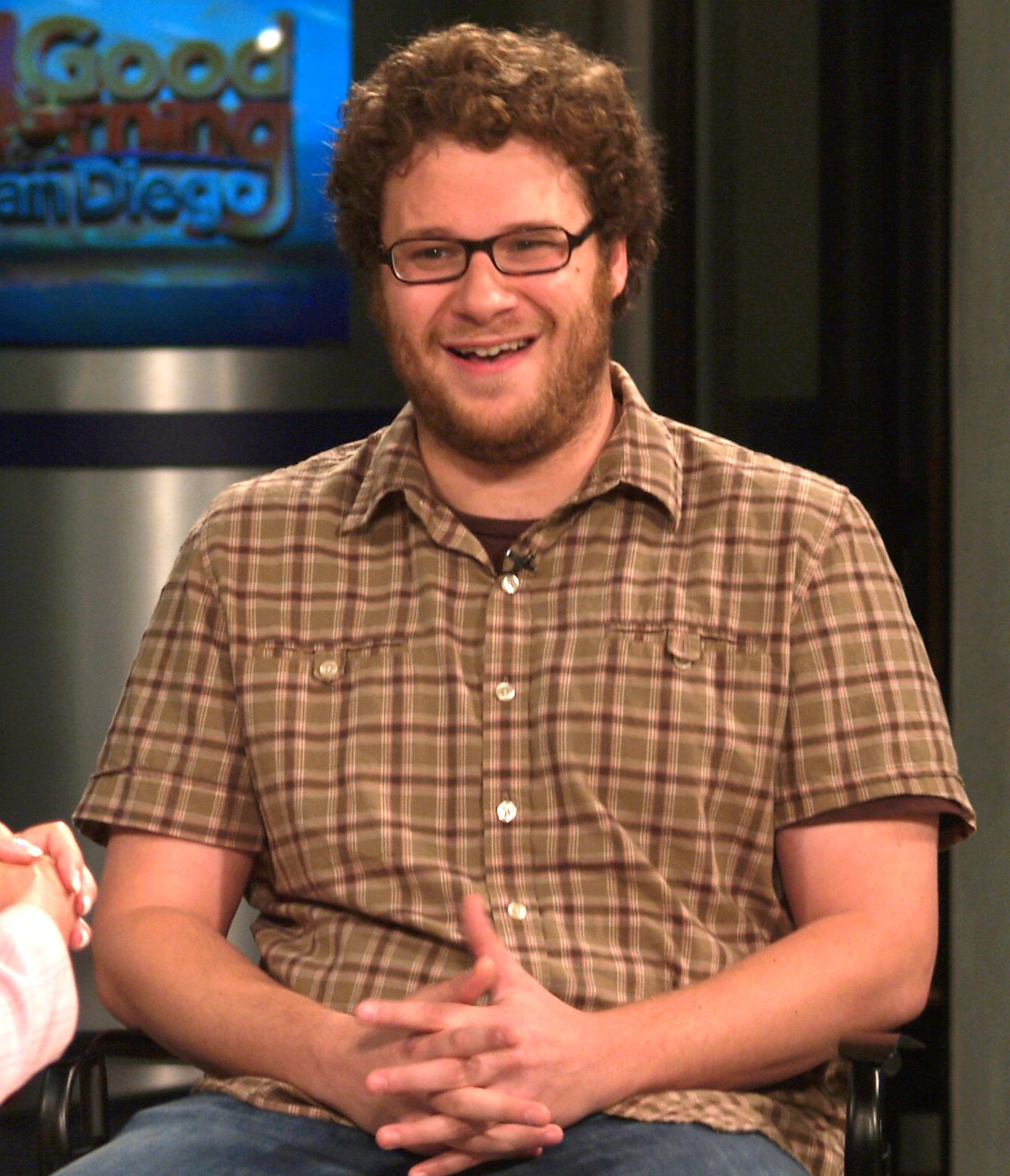
Rogen in 2007

Rogen's breakthrough came when Universal Studios green-lit him for the lead in yet another Apatow production, Knocked Up (2007), a romantic comedy that follows the repercussions of a drunken one-night stand between his slacker character and Katherine Heigl's just-promoted media personality that results in an unintended pregnancy. On completing The 40-Year-Old Virgin, Apatow had approached Rogen about potential starring roles, but the actor suggested many high-concept science fiction ideas. After Apatow insisted that he would work better in real-life situations, the two agreed on the accidental pregnancy concept of this production. Rogen called shooting sex scenes with Heigl "nerve-wracking" and was grateful for the supporting cast for shifting some of the film's focus away from him. Made on a $30 million budget and released on June 1, Knocked Up was a critical and commercial hit, garnering an approval rating of 90% on review aggregator Rotten Tomatoes and grossing $219 million. Rogen also received favourable reviews. Later that year, he played a supporting part as an irresponsible police officer in Superbad, which he wrote with his writing partner, Evan Goldberg, and was co-produced by Apatow. Michael Cera and Jonah Hill originate the main roles, two teenage best friends whose party plans go wrong, based on them. Critics praised the film and its writing, finding it very authentic, and it topped the U.S. box office for two weeks. Rogen then made a vocal cameo appearance in the animated film Shrek the Third, also released in 2007, and hosted Saturday Night Live in October 2007.

Rogen's projects in 2008 included Jimmy Hayward's Horton Hears a Who!, an animated film based on the Dr. Seuss book, where he voiced Morton the Mouse, as well as the fantasy film The Spiderwick Chronicles, where he provided the voice for Hogsqueal. He additionally co-wrote Drillbit Taylor, also produced by Apatow and starring Owen Wilson as the homeless titular character. He based the screenplay on a 70-page scriptment done by John Hughes. The movie was panned by critics who thought its plot—a grown man becoming three kids' bodyguard and beating up their bullies—had no focus and was too drawn-out. "If Superbad were remade as a gimmicky Nickelodeon movie, it would probably look something like Drillbit Taylor," Josh Bell wrote in the Las Vegas Weekly. Rogen voiced another animated movie, Kung Fu Panda, with Jack Black and Angelina Jolie. It did exceptionally well in theatres, making more than $630 million. He made a cameo appearance in the comedy Step Brothers, released in July. Rogen, Goldberg and Apatow were behind the stoner action comedy Pineapple Express directed by David Gordon Green at Columbia Pictures. Apatow produced it while Rogen and Goldberg wrote the script. Rogen was chosen to play the film's protagonist, a 25-year-old who accidentally witnesses a murder while delivering a subpoena. James Franco was cast as his hippie pot dealer with whom he becomes a fugitive. When asked about its inspiration, Rogen said "I write what I know". Pineapple Express was released to theatres in August and made $101 million against its $27 million production budget. Critics lauded it, appreciating the performances and humor.

In April 2008, Empire reported Rogen and Goldberg would write an episode for the animated television series The Simpsons. He also voiced a character in the episode, titled "Homer the Whopper", which opened the 21st season. Kevin Smith's romantic comedy Zack and Miri Make a Porno rounded out 2008 for the actor. He and Elizabeth Banks portrayed the title roles of two Pennsylvania roommates who try to make some extra cash by making an adult film together. After having difficulty trying to secure an R rating, Rogen commented to MTV, "It's a really filthy movie," but complained, "It's really crazy to me that Hostel is fine, with people gouging their eyes out and shit like that ... but you can't show two people having sex – that's too much." The picture was distributed on Halloween by The Weinstein Company and disappointed at the box office. Along with Reese Witherspoon, he voiced a character in the animated science fiction Monsters vs. Aliens (2009), which did well commercially, with a total of $381.5 million. He then starred in the Jody Hill–directed mall cop comedy Observe and Report, in which he portrayed bipolar mall security guard Ronnie Barnhart. The film opened in theatres on April 10. Critics noted a departure in Rogen's acting style from playing laid-back roles to playing a more sadistic character; Wesley Morris from The Boston Globe opined that "Often with Rogen, his vulnerability makes his coarseness safe... Ronnie is something altogether new for Rogen. Vulnerability never arrives. He's shameless." Later in 2009, Rogen starred in Apatow's third directorial feature, Funny People, with Adam Sandler. Rogen played a young, inexperienced comic while Sandler played a mentor of sorts to his character; the film had more dramatic elements in it than Apatow's previous efforts. Funny People was a commercial failure, coming up short of earning back its $75 million budget. The film received generally positive reviews from critics, with a consensus that it had "considerable emotional depth." Rogen hosted Saturday Night Live again in 2009, where the music video for the Lonely Island song "Like a Boss", in which he starred, premiered.

=== 2010–2014: Venture into directing and controversy ===
After years of development, a feature film adaptation of The Green Hornet was handled by Rogen and Goldberg, with a theatrical release in January 2011. Rogen chose to do a re-imagining of the title character. He was executive producer of the movie and also cast himself as the main character. Rogen later admitted to having been overwhelmed by handling its $120 million budget. "It's insane. But it's not so much the specific amount of money that's stressful, it's all the things that go along with making a movie of that size." The actor also went on a strict weight-loss diet to play the slim crime fighter. The Green Hornet was a critical disappointment; Adam Graham of the Detroit News called it "a big, sloppy, loud, grating mess of a movie," and the Arizona Republic's Bill Goodykoontz found its story to have fallen apart. Nonetheless, it still opened at No. 1 at the box office, making $33 million in its opening weekend before going on to gross more than $225 million. In 2011, Rogen and Evan Goldberg founded the production company Point Grey Pictures, named after Point Grey Secondary School, which they both attended.

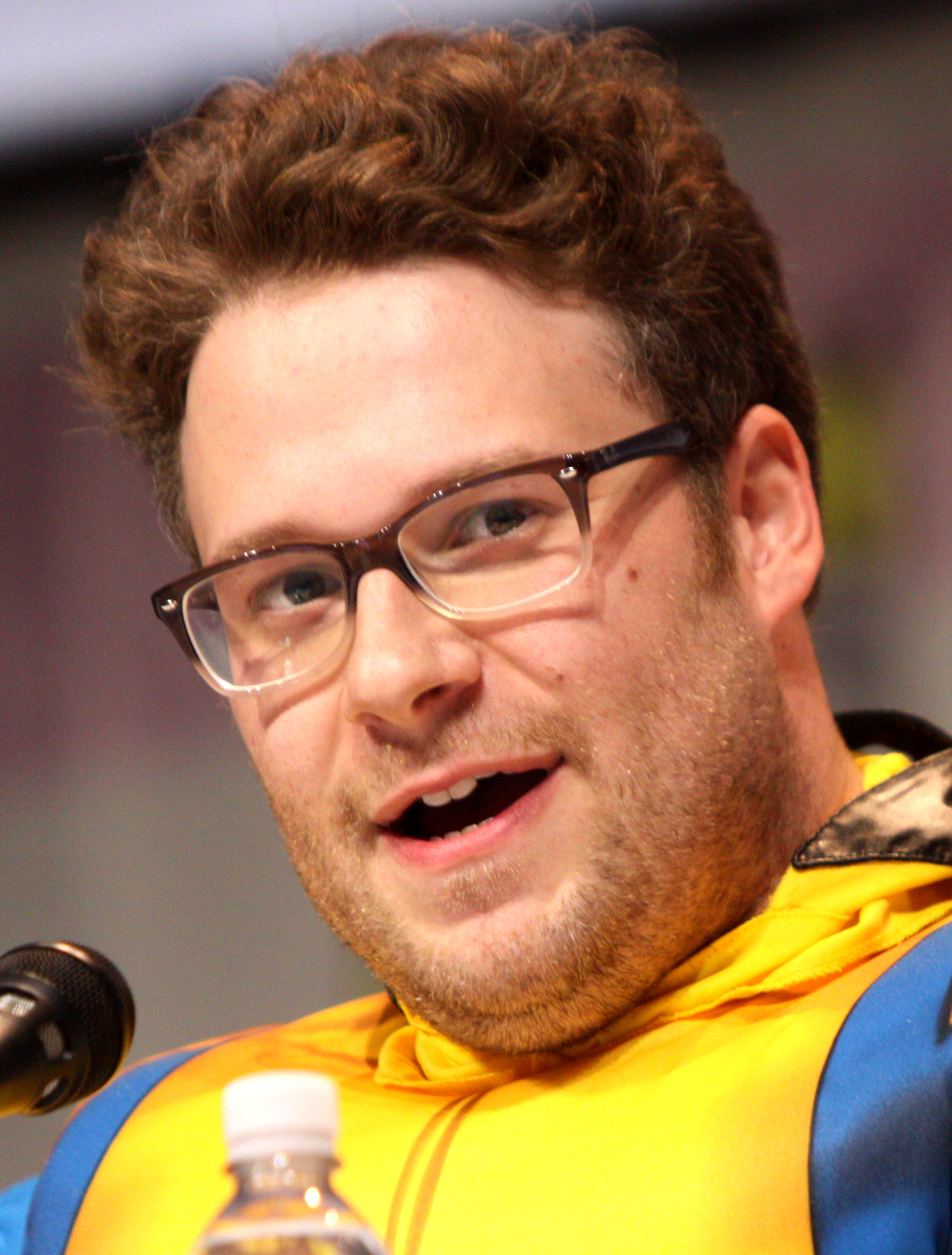
Rogen at the 2013 WonderCon

Rogen provided the voice and motion capture for the titular character, a grey alien, in the science fiction comedy Paul (2011). The film also starred Simon Pegg and Nick Frost as a pair of geeks who help Paul escape from FBI agents. He reprised his voice role in Kung Fu Panda 2, as well as produced and took a supporting role in Jonathan Levine's 50/50. The dramedy about cancer was based on an autobiographical script by screenwriter Will Reiser and was released in September 2011. The drama Take This Waltz, his fourth film of 2011, featured Rogen as a man whose wife (played by Michelle Williams) explores a new relationship with another man. From 2011 to 2015, Rogen played Dirty Randy, a librarian and pornographer, in the sitcom The League, in addition to writing two episodes. Rogen hosted the 27th Independent Spirit Awards in February 2012, and the road movie The Guilt Trip, co-starring Barbra Streisand, was released in cinemas that December. The film was about an inventor (Rogen) who invites his mother (Streisand) on a road trip, as he attempts to sell his new product while also reuniting her with a lost love.

In 2013, Rogen and his screenwriting collaborator, Evan Goldberg, made their directorial debut with This Is the End, a comedy featuring Rogen, Jay Baruchel, James Franco, Jonah Hill, Craig Robinson and Danny McBride playing fictional versions of themselves facing a global apocalypse. The film received positive reviews and was No. 2 at the box office on its opening weekend. Rogen recurred on the revived fourth season of the comedy series Arrested Development in May 2013, playing a young George Bluth Sr. (played by Jeffrey Tambor) in several flashback scenes. He co-wrote the foreword for the 2014 book Console Wars: Sega, Nintendo, and the Battle that Defined a Generation by Blake J. Harris. and was reported be working on an adaptation with Goldberg.

Rogen hosted Saturday Night Live for a third time in 2014. That May, Rogen starred in Neighbors with Rose Byrne and Zac Efron, which was directed by Nicholas Stoller. In the film, Rogen and Byrne play a couple that comes into conflict with a fraternity, led by Efron's character, living next door. The film became Rogen's highest-grossing non-animated film, having grossed over $270 million globally. Rogen and Evan Goldberg co-directed and co-wrote the story for the action comedy The Interview, starring Rogen and James Franco as a pair of journalists who are recruited by the CIA to assassinate North Korean leader Kim Jong-un after setting up an interview with him. In June 2014, North Korea threatened a "merciless" retaliation on the United States if it did not ban The Interview, labelling the movie "an act of war" and a "wanton act of terror", and Rogen himself a "gangster filmmaker". In December, Sony Pictures announced that it was cancelling the release of the movie after a cyber attack on the studio, allegedly tied to North Korea and threats made subsequently by Kim Jong-un. As a result of criticism of this decision, Sony subsequently made the film available online and it allowed a theatrical release on December 25, 2014, drawing mixed opinions from film critics. Scott Foundas of Variety found the film to be "about as funny as a communist food shortage, and just as protracted," while The Daily Telegraph critic Robbie Collin opined that it was "a raucous, abrasive, snort-out-loud satire with mischief in its heart and methane in its gut." It grossed $11.3 million in theatres, but had strong online sales and rentals. Also in 2014, Rogen made cameo appearances in the comedy 22 Jump Street as the double of Jonah Hill's character and in James Franco's drama The Sound and the Fury as a telegrapher. During the time, Rogen and Goldberg, through their Point Grey Pictures company, had set up a joint venture with major client Good Universe to set up mainstream comedy films.

=== 2015–2024: Career expansion ===
Rogen portrayed Apple Inc. co-founder Steve Wozniak in the Danny Boyle–directed Steve Jobs biopic (2015), based on a screenplay by Aaron Sorkin. His performance in the film was widely praised, and he was commended by Wozniak himself for doing an "excellent job". In November 2015, Rogen starred alongside Joseph Gordon-Levitt and Anthony Mackie in the Christmas-themed comedy The Night Before as three best friends who annually reunite to celebrate Christmas Eve. In 2016, he reprised his voice role as Master Mantis in Kung Fu Panda 3 and as Mac Radner in the Neighbors sequel Neighbors 2: Sorority Rising. Along with Goldberg and Sam Catlin, Rogen developed the television series Preacher for Sony Pictures Television, which premiered on AMC in May 2016. The show is based on the comic book series of the same name that was created by Garth Ennis and Steve Dillon and follows a small-town preacher named Jesse Custer (played by Dominic Cooper) who possesses a superpower that allows him to command others to do as he says. His last release of 2016 was the animated comedy Sausage Party, which, in addition to voicing the lead character Frank – a sausage that tries to escape his fate in a supermarket – he co-wrote and produced. Sausage Party became the most commercially successful R-rated animated film of all time, overtaking South Park: Bigger, Longer & Uncut (1999). Associated Press critic Lindsey Bahr wrote of the film: "There is no one out there making comedies quite like Rogen and Goldberg. They are putting their definitive stamp on the modern American comedy one decency-smashing double entendre at a time."

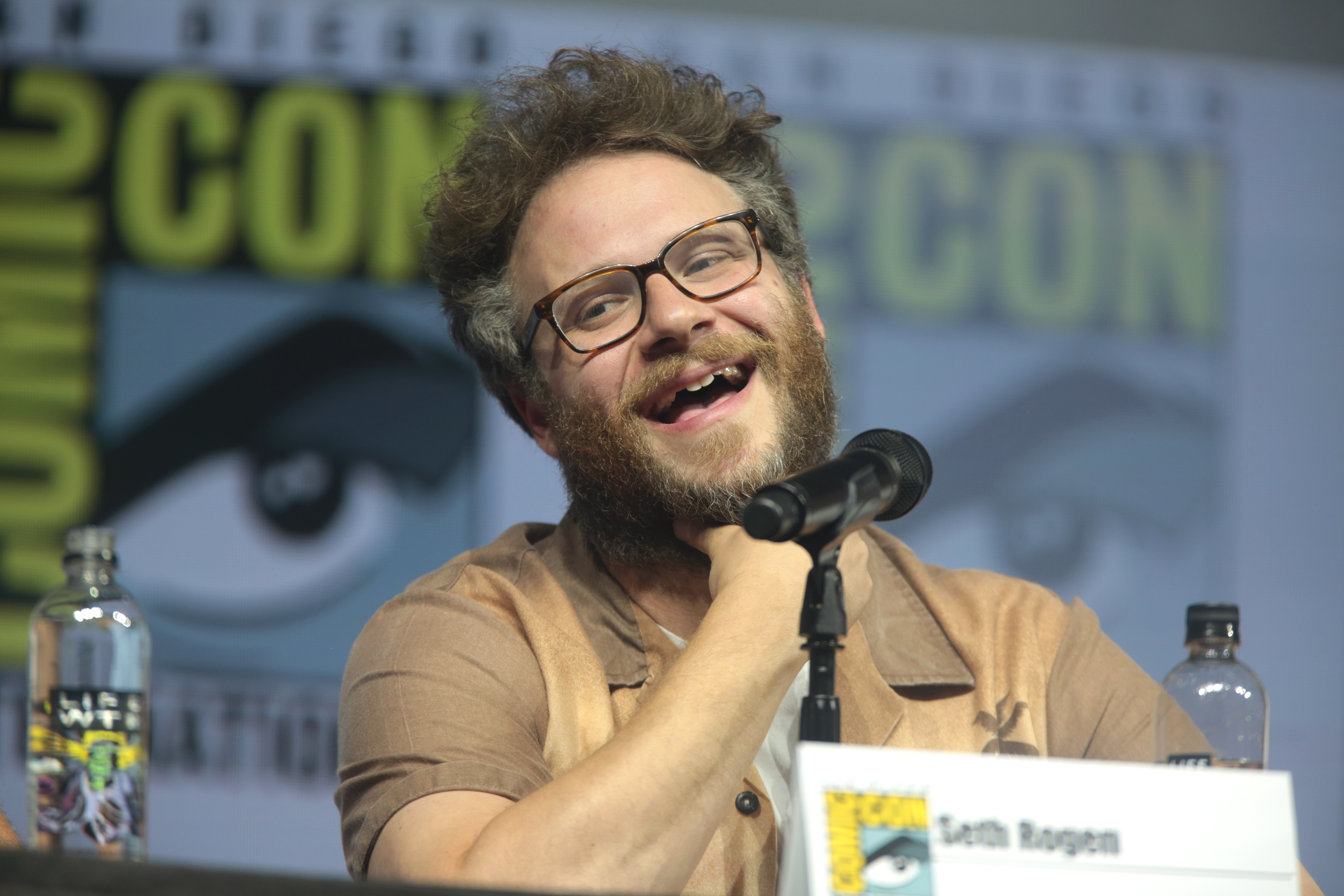
Rogen at the 2018 San Diego Comic-Con

Along with Evan Goldberg, Rogen directed and executive produced the science fiction comedy series Future Man, starring Josh Hutcherson, which premiered on the streaming service Hulu in November 2017. The same year, Rogen and Goldberg also co-directed a short commercial film for Walmart, titled Bananas Town, and Rogen portrayed Sandy Schklair, the script supervisor for The Room director and star Tommy Wiseau (played by James Franco), in the Franco-directed film The Disaster Artist, based on the book of the same name, which chronicles the making of the 2003 film The Room. Rogen, as the founder of Hilarity for Charity, an organization that raises funds for Alzheimer's research and support, hosts an annual fundraising comedy event named after the organization. The sixth event was broadcast through the streaming service Netflix in April 2018. In July 2018, it was announced that Rogen was to voice public service announcements in his native Vancouver's TransLink transit system and Toronto's Toronto Transit Commission. Rogen co-starred alongside Kristen Bell and Kelsey Grammer as the love interest of Bell's character in the 2018 comedy-drama Like Father, directed by Rogen's wife, Lauren Miller. In 2019, Rogen starred opposite Charlize Theron in the romantic comedy Long Shot, as an unemployed journalist who re-connects with his childhood love interest and babysitter (Theron), who has become a major political figure.

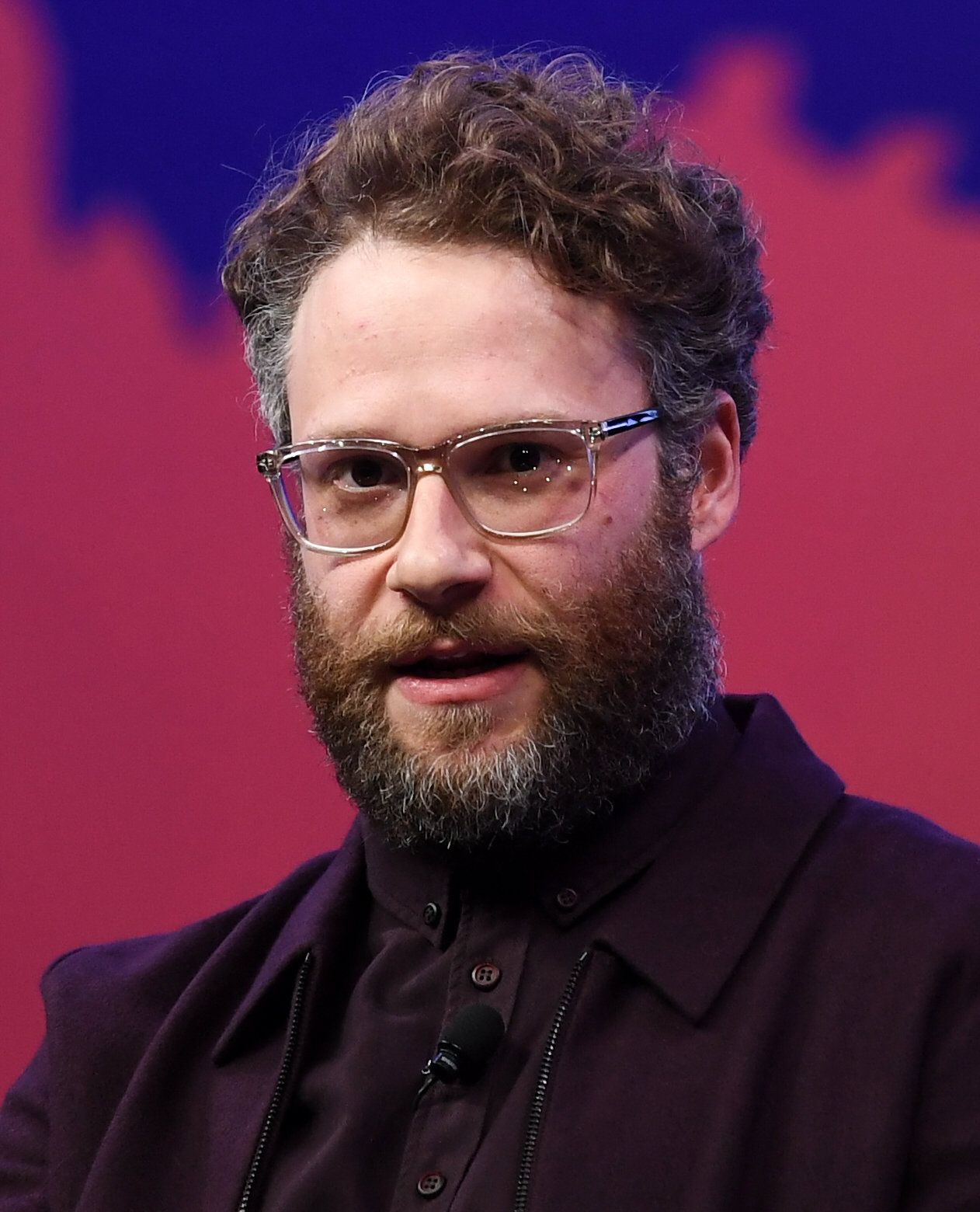
Rogen in 2019

Rogen co-starred in the 2019 remake of the animated musical film The Lion King (1994), voicing the warthog Pumbaa, who rescues the film's protagonist Simba with his friend Timon, voiced by Donald Glover and Billy Eichner, respectively. He sang three songs in the film, which were included on the soundtrack release. Rogen said that, "[a]s an actor, I don't think I'm right for every role — there are a lot of roles I don't think I'm right for even in movies I'm making — but Pumbaa was one I knew I could do well." It had a middling reception from critics, and became one of the highest-grossing films of all time with earnings of more than $1.663 billion. Rogen and Eichner received praise for their chemistry. In 2019, Rogen also produced the comedy Good Boys, starring Jacob Tremblay for Universal Pictures, and the television shows The Boys and Black Monday, directing the pilot for the latter show with Goldberg. In 2021, he voiced Allen the Alien in the animated series Invincible, in which he also serves as producer. Rogen filmed scenes for the James Franco film Zeroville in 2014, which was not released until 2019.

In 2020, it was announced that Rogen would serve as a producer for the animated film, Teenage Mutant Ninja Turtles: Mutant Mayhem (2023). In addition to producing, he co-wrote it, and provided the voice of Bebop. Rogen's first book, Yearbook, was published in May 2021. Yearbook is a memoir that features a collection of essays spanning from Rogen's adolescence to his experiences in Hollywood. In September 2021, Nintendo announced in a Nintendo Direct presentation that Rogen would be voicing Donkey Kong in the 2023 animated film The Super Mario Bros. Movie, with a spin-off film focused around the character planned, as well. In 2023, it was announced that Rogen will serve as an executive producer, and appear as a guest judge, in the upcoming Canadian reality competition series The Great Canadian Pottery Throw Down. Also in 2023, Rogen was cast alongside Aziz Ansari and Keanu Reeves in Ansari's film directorial debut, Good Fortune. The project began filming in January 2024, with Keke Palmer posting on her Instagram page that she had joined Rogen as part of the cast that same month.

=== 2025–present: Awards recognition ===
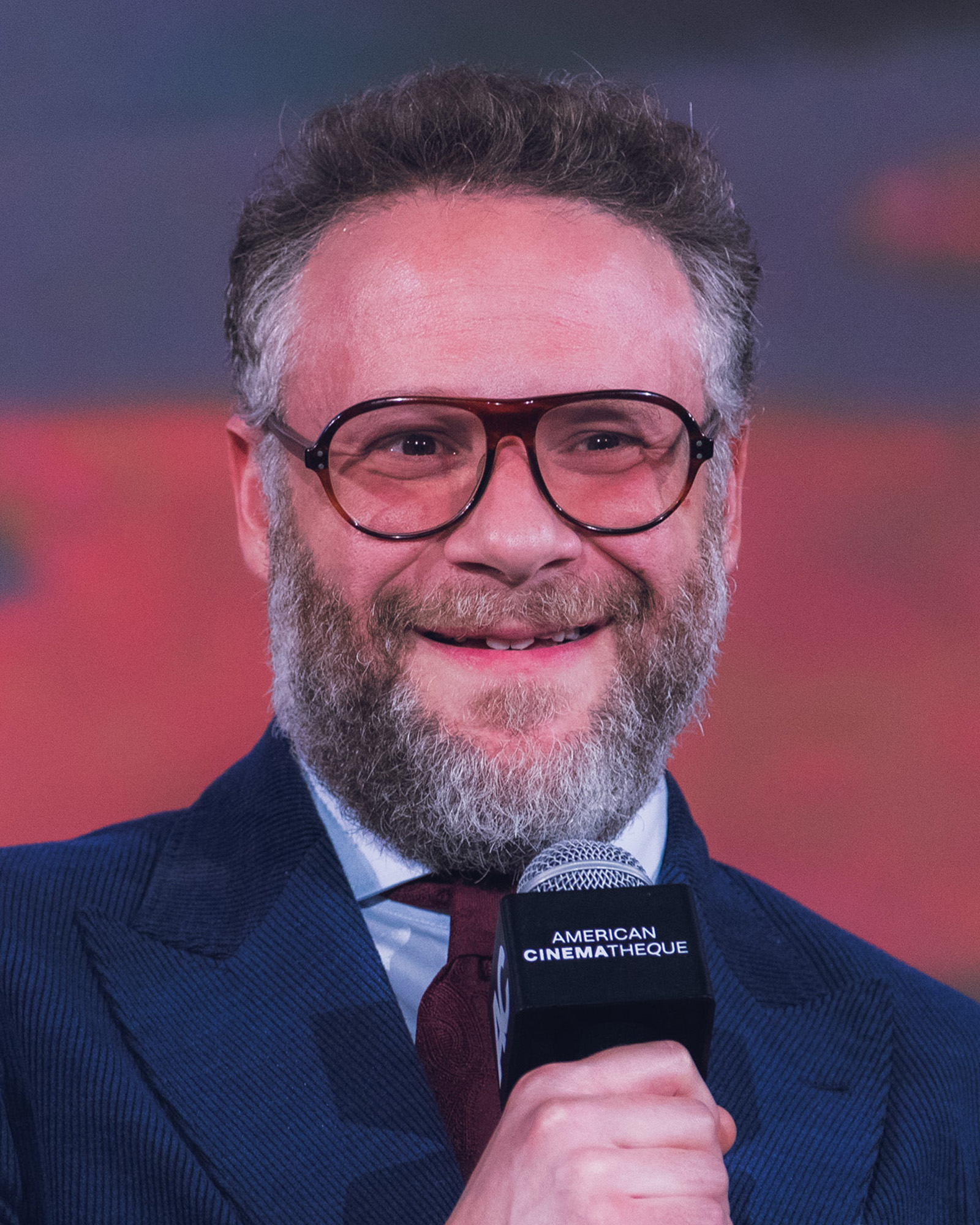
Rogen in 2025

March 2025 saw the debut of The Studio, a comedy series created by Rogen and Goldberg for Apple TV+. Starring Rogen as Matt Remick, an executive at a fictional major Hollywood studio, the industry satire drew extensive plaudits. At the 77th Primetime Emmy Awards, The Studio collected thirteen wins, four of which were for Rogen in his roles as producer, director, writer, and lead actor. Further honours included awards for Best Television Series – Musical or Comedy and Best Actor – Television Series Musical or Comedy at the 83rd Golden Globes. Rogen later reflected that he had "never, literally, won any awards before this, so I by no means expected this."

Rogen took a number of voice roles in 2026, including as Napoleon in a widely pilloried adaptation of George Orwell's Animal Farm. After Olivia Wilde guest-starred in an episode of The Studio, she cast Rogen as her co-lead in The Invite, in which they played a dysfunctional married couple. The film earned strong reviews and was a surprise commercial success over the summer.

== Political views and activism ==
Rogen has been active in raising awareness of Alzheimer's disease. The disease runs in his wife's family and has affected her mother for several years. "I think until you see it firsthand, it's kind of hard to conceive of how brutal it is," Rogen said to CNN. "Until I saw it, you just don't get kind of how heartbreaking it can be." During the interview, he talked about how he tries to be emotionally supportive and around as much as he can for his mother-in-law. Both he and Lauren spoke to Larry King for A Larry King Special, Unthinkable: The Alzheimer's Epidemic, which aired in April 2011. Rogen testified about the disease and his charity before the United States Senate Appropriations Subcommittee on Labor, Health and Human Services on February 26, 2014. Rogen started the Hilarity for Charity movement to inspire change and raise awareness of Alzheimer's disease among the Millennial Generation. Rogen and his wife also initiated the Alzheimer's and Dementia Care Grant Program with Home Instead Senior Care to provide free at-home dementia care to senior citizens. On February 25, 2016, Rogen and Miller were honoured with the unite2gether accolade from unite4:humanity for their work promoting awareness and raising money for Alzheimer's disease research through Hilarity for Charity.

Rogen appeared in a Bud Light commercial celebrating LGBT Pride Month and the Supreme Court of the United States ruling that granted same-sex couples the right to marry. Rogen is a member of Pi Kappa Alpha fraternity (Lambda Delta chapter) at the University of Vermont. He was initiated in April 2017 after his fourth visit to the campus for his Hilarity for Charity movement. Rogen is also a member of National Organization for the Reform of Marijuana Laws and an open marijuana user. Rogen and his longtime friend and collaborator Evan Goldberg launched the cannabis company Houseplant in Canada in 2019.

In June 2018, Rogen was invited by Mitt Romney to speak at a seminar for awareness of Alzheimer's disease hosted by Romney in Park City, Utah. Speaker of the House of Representatives Paul Ryan, who was in also attendance, asked Rogen for a photo after Ryan's children engaged Rogen in conversation. Rogen refused, stating in an interview with Stephen Colbert, "I look over and his kids are standing right there expectantly, clearly fans of mine, and I said, 'No way, man!'" and telling Ryan, "Furthermore, I hate what you're doing to the country at this moment, and I'm counting the days until you no longer have one iota of the power that you currently have."

On July 3, 2018, Rogen criticized Twitter and its CEO Jack Dorsey, claiming he had a "bizarre need to verify white supremacists". Variety reported that he was "directly in touch" with Dorsey over the issue. Several media outlets, including Fortune, speculated that Rogen was referring to alt-right figure Jason Kessler, and the Proud Boys in particular.

Rogen is a supporter of the Black Lives Matter movement.

On the Israeli–Palestinian conflict, Rogen said in an interview with fellow Jewish comedian Marc Maron in 2020:

As a Jewish person, like I was fed a huge amount of lies about Israel my entire life. You know, they never tell you, that oh by the way, there were (Palestinian) people there. They make it seem like it was just like sitting there, like the fucking door's open.

He mentioned his belief that antisemitism has remained pervasive and prevalent, but also spoke to the importance of a strong Jewish diaspora: "You don't keep something you're trying to preserve all in one place."

Rogen later elaborated: "I think that it's a tricky conversation to have in jest. And that's something that perhaps I now look at and say, 'Oh, now that we joked about that, perhaps we could clarify some things so people don't run around thinking that I think Israel shouldn't exist anymore.' And I'm sensitive to Jewish people being hurt, as a Jewish person. And I'm sensitive to Jewish people thinking I'm not a proud Jewish person, which I am. Truthfully, I think my pride in being Jewish and how deeply I identify as a Jewish person perhaps made me feel like I was able to say things without as much context as perhaps I should give them – you know what I'm saying? And I am sensitive to Jews thinking that I don't think Israel should not exist [sic], and that there are a lot of Jewish people who are alive who wouldn't be without Israel. And my parents met in Israel; I've been to Israel several times."

During the 2025 ceremony of the Breakthrough Prize, Rogen, who was presenting a physics prize alongside Edward Norton, attracted attention with some unscripted jokes regarding the science policy of the second Donald Trump administration. They appeared to target some figures of the tech oligarchy linked to the Breakthrough Prize. He stated that "it's amazing that others in this room underwrote electing a man who, in the last week, single-handedly destroyed all of American science", and: "it's amazing how much good science you can destroy with $320 million and RFK Jr., very fast". The comments were edited out from the YouTube broadcast, which aired a week later.

== Personal life ==
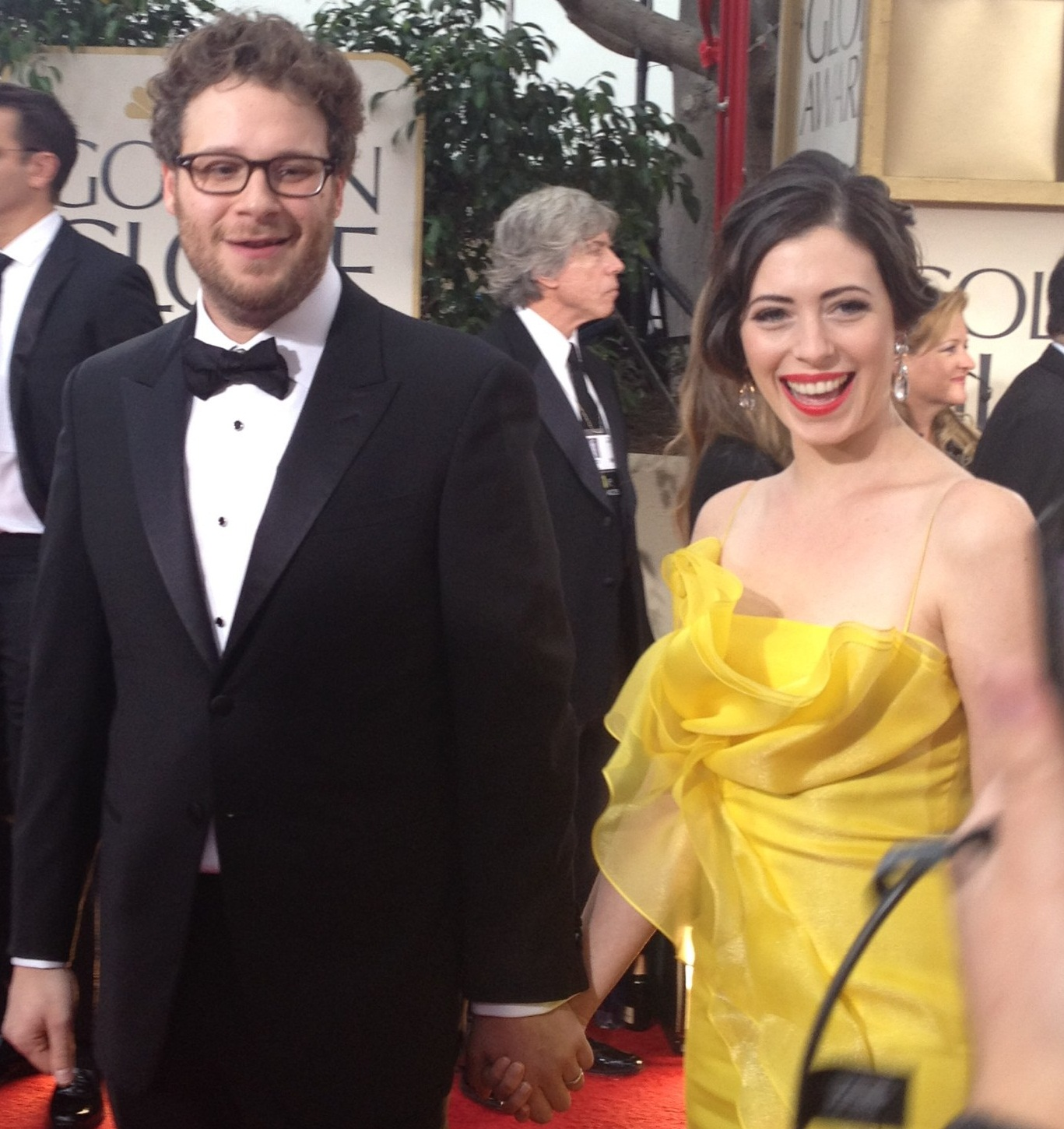
Rogen with his wife, Lauren Miller, at the 69th Annual Golden Globes Awards in 2012

Rogen began dating writer and actress Lauren Miller in 2004. They met while he was working on Da Ali G Show. They became engaged on September 29, 2010 and married on October 2, 2011, in Sonoma County, California. Miller has had minor onscreen roles in a few of Rogen's films. They have stated they do not plan to have children.

Rogen created a cannabis brand in Toronto, Ontario, with his friend Evan Goldberg. After attending pottery classes with his wife in 2017, he began making ceramics. He cites artist Kenneth Price as an inspiration.

In January 2021, Rogen revealed on Twitter that he has mild Tourette syndrome, which runs in his family.

== Written works ==
- Rogen, Seth (May 11, 2021). Yearbook. New York: Crown. ISBN 978-1984825407. OCLC 1235903024.

== See also ==
- List of celebrities who own cannabis businesses
