= Joe Drake (producer) =

Movie industry professional

Joseph Drake
- Occupation: Film producer
- Organization: Good Universe

Joseph Drake is an American film producer, best known for founding Mandate Pictures and Good Universe with Nathan Kahane. Drake has served as executive producer on more than 25 films.

== Career ==
Early in his career, Drake served posts at Rysher Entertainment, Senator International and Moviestore Entertainment.

Drake previously served as president and Co-Chief Operating Officer of the Lionsgate Motion Picture Group. At Lionsgate, he oversaw the launch of Hunger Games and The Expendables franchises. In 2012, along with Kahane, he launched Good Universe.

Good Universe entered into a partnership with Seth Rogen and Evan Goldberg’s Point Grey Pictures to produce and finance mainstream comedies such as the Untitled Ben Schwartz Comedy with Gary Sanchez Productions to be directed by Adam McKay and starring Rogen and James Franco's The Masterpiece for New Line Cinema.

Drake is also a partner with Sam Raimi, Robert Tapert and Kahane in Ghost House Pictures, specialising in horror films. Releases include Fede Álvarez's Don't Breathe, The Grudge and Evil Dead for Sony Pictures.

Drake founded Mandate Pictures in 2005, following a management buyout of Senator International which he launched in 2001. Mandate Pictures produced Juno, the Harold & Kumar Go to White Castle franchise; Young Adult (film), Hope Springs and This is the End. In 2007, the partners sold Mandate Pictures to Lionsgate. Following the acquisition of Mandate, Drake transitioned into his role as the President of the Lionsgate Motion Picture Group and Co-chief Operating Officer of Lionsgate, while maintaining his role as CEO of Mandate Pictures.

== Filmography ==
He was a producer in all films unless otherwise noted.

=== Film ===
Year	Film	Credit	Notes
2000	American Psycho	Executive producer	
2004	Harold & Kumar Go to White Castle	Executive producer	
2004	The Grudge	Executive producer	
2005	Boogeyman	Executive producer	
2005	Lords of Dogtown	Executive producer	
2006	Stranger than Fiction	Executive producer	
2006	The Grudge 2	Executive producer	
2007	The Messengers	Executive producer	
2007	Juno	Executive producer	
2007	30 Days of Night	Executive producer	
2007	Boogeyman 2	Executive producer	Direct-to-video
2007	Mr. Magorium's Wonder Emporium	Executive producer	
2008	Harold & Kumar Escape from Guantanamo Bay	Executive producer	
2008	The Strangers	Executive producer	
2008	Nick & Norah's Infinite Playlist	Executive producer	
2008	Passengers	Executive producer	
2009	Horsemen	Executive producer	
2009	Drag Me to Hell	Executive producer	
2009	Whip It	Executive producer	
2012	The Possession	Executive producer	
2013	Evil Dead	Executive producer	
2013	Last Vegas		
2013	The Hunger Games: Catching Fire	Executive producer	
2014	Neighbors	Executive producer	
2015	Always Watching: A Marble Hornets Story	Executive producer	
2015	The Hunger Games: Mockingjay – Part 2	Executive producer	
2015	The Night Before	Executive producer	
2016	Don't Breathe	Executive producer	
2016	Neighbors 2: Sorority Rising	Executive producer	
2017	The House		
2017	The Disaster Artist	Executive producer	
2018	Blockers	Executive producer	
2019	Long Shot	Executive producer	
2021	Don't Breathe 2	Executive producer	
2023	The Hunger Games: The Ballad of Songbirds & Snakes		
TBA	Firewatch		
TBA	Hold Back the Stars	Executive producer	
TBA	The Last Drop		
TBA	The Something	Executive producer	

Miscellaneous crew

Year	Film	Role
2009	Saw VI	Marketing: Lionsgate
2010	Saw 3D	For: Lionsgate

Production manager

Year	Film	Role
1990	Ski School	Executive in charge of production

Thanks

Year	Film	Role
2000	Shadow of the Vampire	Thanks

=== Television ===
Year	Title
2009	13: Fear Is Real
