= Nathan Kahane =

Film producer

- Occupation: Producer
- Organization: Good Universe
- Title: Co-founder

Nathan Kahane is an American film producer known for being the co-founder of Mandate Pictures and Good Universe with Joe Drake.

Kahane's production credits include Last Vegas (2013); Neighbors (2014); The House, a 2017 comedy starring Will Ferrell and Amy Poehler, for New Line Cinema; and the sci-fi thriller Extinction (2018), written by Spenser Cohen.

Kahane is a partner with Ghost House Pictures. Kahane was an executive producer on Ghost House Pictures' The Grudge (2004), Evil Dead (2013), and Don't Breathe (2016).

== Career ==
Kahane's entertainment career began in the International Creative Management agent training program.

Before partnering with Drake, Kahane was the executive vice president of The Canton Company, Mark Canton's production company housed at Warner Bros. While at The Canton Company, Kahane was a co-producer on the thriller film Trapped (2002). He was also executive in charge of production for Angel Eyes (2001) and Get Carter (2000) and packaged titles such as Alexander (2004) and Troy (2004).

In 2002, Kahane became an executive vice president of motion pictures at Senator International, German company Senator Entertainment AG's Los Angeles-based production and distribution operation.

In 2003, Kahane co-founded Mandate Pictures with Drake. He was also the president of Mandate Pictures. At Mandate Pictures, he produced films such as the Harold & Kumar franchise, Juno (2007), the comedy 50/50 (2011), Young Adult (2011), Hope Springs (2012), and This Is the End (2013).

In 2012, Kahane co-founded Good Universe with Drake.

In 2018, Kahane became president of the Lionsgate motion picture group.

== Personal life ==
Kahane is an alumnus of the Haas School of Business at the University of California, Berkeley.

== Filmography ==
He was a producer in all films listed below unless otherwise noted.

=== Film ===
Year	Film	Credit	Notes
2002	Trapped	Co-producer	
2004	Harold & Kumar Go to White Castle		
2004	The Grudge	Executive producer	
2005	Boogeyman	Executive producer	
2005	Neverwas	Executive producer	
2006	Stranger than Fiction	Executive producer	
2006	The Grudge 2	Executive producer	
2007	The Messengers	Executive producer	
2007	Rise: Blood Hunter	Executive producer	
2007	Juno	Executive producer	
2007	30 Days of Night	Executive producer	
2007	Boogeyman 2	Executive producer	Direct-to-video
2007	Mr. Magorium's Wonder Emporium	Executive producer	
2008	Harold & Kumar Escape from Guantanamo Bay		
2008	The Strangers		
2008	Nick & Norah's Infinite Playlist	Executive producer	
2008	Passengers	Executive producer	
2009	Horsemen	Executive producer	
2009	Drag Me to Hell	Executive producer	
2009	Whip It	Executive producer	
2010	Peacock	Executive producer	
2010	The Switch	Executive producer	
2011	50/50	Executive producer	
2011	A Very Harold & Kumar 3D Christmas	Executive producer	
2011	Young Adult	Executive producer	
2012	LOL	Executive producer	
2012	Seeking a Friend for the End of the World	Executive producer	
2012	Hope Springs	Executive producer	
2012	The Possession	Executive producer	
2013	Charlie Countryman	Executive producer	
2013	Evil Dead	Executive producer	
2013	This Is the End	Executive producer	
2013	Paradise	Executive producer	
2013	Last Vegas	Executive producer	
2013	Oldboy	Executive producer	
2014	Neighbors	Executive producer	
2015	The Night Before	Executive producer	
2016	Don't Breathe	Executive producer	
2016	Neighbors 2: Sorority Rising	Executive producer	
2017	The House		
2017	The Disaster Artist	Executive producer	
2018	Blockers	Executive producer	
2018	Ibiza		
2018	Extinction	Executive producer	
2019	Long Shot	Executive producer	
2019	Good Boys	Executive producer	
2019	Always Be My Maybe		
2020	The Grudge	Executive producer	
2020	Desperados		
2021	Don't Breathe 2	Executive producer	
2027	Karoshi		
TBA	Hold Back the Stars	Executive producer	
TBA	The Last Drop		
TBA	The Something	Executive producer	

Production manager

Year	Film	Role
2000	Get Carter	Executive in charge of production
2001	Angel Eyes	Executive in charge of production

Miscellaneous crew

Year	Film	Role
2000	Get Carter	Production executive: The Canton Company

Thanks

Year	Film	Role
2000	Preston Tylk	Thanks
2013	Don Jon	With special thanks to

=== Television ===
Year	Title
2009	13: Fear Is Real
