= List of Universal Pictures films (2010–2019) =

This is a list of films produced and/or distributed by Universal Pictures from 2010 to 2019, founded in 1912 as the Universal Film Manufacturing Company. It is the main motion picture production and distribution arm of Universal Studios, a subsidiary of the NBCUniversal division of Comcast.

== 2010 ==
Release date	Title	Notes
January 8, 2010	Leap Year (Note: Co-owned by Content Partners LLC)	distribution outside the U.K., Ireland, Australia, New Zealand, Greece, Cyprus, France, Germany, Austria, Portugal, Angola, Mozambique, Israel, Poland and Hungary only; co-production with Spyglass Entertainment and Benderspink
February 12, 2010	The Wolfman	co-production with Relativity Media and Stuber Pictures
March 12, 2010	Green Zone	distribution outside France only; co-production with StudioCanal, Relativity Media and Working Title Films; rights licensed to Medusa Film for Italy
March 19, 2010	Repo Men	co-production with Relativity Media and Stuber Pictures
April 16, 2010	Kick-Ass	distribution in the U.K., Ireland, Australia, New Zealand, Germany, Austria, Switzerland, Spain, Andorra and Latin America only; produced by Marv Films and Plan B Entertainment
May 14, 2010	Robin Hood	co-production with Imagine Entertainment, Relativity Media and Scott Free Productions
May 21, 2010	MacGruber	distribution in the U.S., the U.K., Ireland, Germany, Austria, Switzerland, Italy, Spain, Andorra, the Benelux excluding Belgium and, South Africa, the Middle East, Israel, India and Japan only; produced by Rogue Pictures, Relativity Media and Michaels-Goldwyn
June 3, 2010	Senna	international distribution outside France only; co-production with StudioCanal, Working Title Films and Midfield Films
June 4, 2010	Get Him to the Greek	co-production with Relativity Media, Spyglass Entertainment and Apatow Productions
July 9, 2010	Despicable Me	co-production with Illumination Entertainment
July 30, 2010	Charlie St. Cloud	co-production with Relativity Media and Marc Platt Productions
August 6, 2010	Step Up 3D	U.K., Irish, French, Swiss, Australian and New Zealand distribution only; produced by Touchstone Pictures, Summit Entertainment and Offspring Entertainment
August 13, 2010	Scott Pilgrim vs. the World	co-production with Marc Platt Productions and Big Talk Productions
August 20, 2010	Nanny McPhee Returns	released as Nanny McPhee and the Big Bang in the U.K. and Ireland distribution outside France only; produced by StudioCanal, Relativity Media, Working Title Films and Three Strange Angels
September 17, 2010	Devil	distribution only; produced by Media Rights Capital and The Night Chronicles
September 17, 2010	Catfish	U.S. distribution only; produced by Rogue, Relativity Media, Hit the Ground Running and A Supermarche
October 8, 2010	My Soul to Take	distribution in the U.S., Germany, Austria, Switzerland, Italy, Spain, Andorra, the Netherlands, Flanders, Scandinavia, Portugal, South Africa, India, Malaysia, Singapore and Japan only; produced by Rogue Pictures, Relativity Media and Corvus Corax
November 12, 2010	Skyline	U.S. distribution excluding television only; produced by Rogue, Relativity Media, Hydraulic Entertainment, Transmission and Rat Entertainment
December 22, 2010	Little Fockers	North American distribution only; co-production with Paramount Pictures, DW Studios, Relativity Media, Tribeca Productions and Everyman Pictures

== 2011 ==
Release date	Title	Notes
January 14, 2011	The Dilemma	co-production with Imagine Entertainment, Spyglass Entertainment and Wild West Picture Show Productions
February 4, 2011	Sanctum	North American, U.K., Irish, Australian and New Zealand distribution only; produced by Relativity Media and Wayfare Entertainment
March 4, 2011	The Adjustment Bureau	distribution only; produced by Media Rights Capital, Gambit Pictures and Electric Shepherd Productions
March 4, 2011	Take Me Home Tonight	international distribution only; produced by Rogue, Imagine Entertainment and Relativity Media; distributed in the U.S. by Relativity Media
March 18, 2011	Paul	distribution only; produced by Relativity Media, Working Title Films and Big Talk Productions
April 1, 2011	Hop	co-production with Relativity Media and Illumination Entertainment
April 8, 2011	Your Highness	co-production with Stuber Productions; rights licensed to Entertainment One for the U.K. and Ireland
April 29, 2011	Fast Five	co-production with Original Film and One Race Films
May 13, 2011	Bridesmaids	co-production with Relativity Media and Apatow Productions
July 1, 2011	Larry Crowne	U.S. distribution only; produced by Vendôme Pictures and Playtone
July 29, 2011	Cowboys & Aliens	North American distribution only; co-production with DreamWorks Pictures, Reliance Entertainment, Relativity Media, Imagine Entertainment, K/O Paper Products, Fairview Entertainment and Platinum Studios
August 5, 2011	The Change-Up	co-production with Relativity Media, Original Film and Big Kid Pictures
September 30, 2011	Dream House	U.S. and Italian distribution only; produced by Morgan Creek Productions
October 14, 2011	The Thing	distribution outside Eastern Europe, the Baltics, the CIS, South Africa, Greece, Cyprus, the Middle East, Turkey, India, Korea, Thailand, Laos, Cambodia, the Philippines and Japan only; co-production with Morgan Creek Productions and Strike Entertainment
October 21, 2011	Johnny English Reborn	distribution outside France only; produced by StudioCanal, Relativity Media and Working Title Films
November 2, 2011	Michael Jackson: The Life of an Icon	distribution only; produced by David Gest Productions
November 4, 2011	Tower Heist	co-production with Imagine Entertainment and Relativity Media
November 11, 2011	Immortals	distribution in the U.K., Ireland, Spain, Switzerland, Australia, New Zealand, Hong Kong, Singapore and Japan only; produced by Relativity Media, Virgin Produced, Atmosphere Entertainment and Hollywood Gang Productions

== 2012 ==
Release date	Title	Notes
January 13, 2012	Contraband	distribution only; produced by Working Title Films, Blueeyes Productions, Leverage Productions and Closest to the Hole Productions
February 3, 2012	Big Miracle	co-production with Anonymous Content and Working Title Films
February 10, 2012	Safe House	co-production with Relativity Media and Bluegrass Films
February 24, 2012	Wanderlust	co-production with Relativity Media, Apatow Productions and A Hot Dog Productions
March 2, 2012	Dr. Seuss' The Lorax	co-production with Illumination Entertainment
April 6, 2012	American Reunion	co-production with Relativity Media, Practical Pictures and Zide Pictures
April 27, 2012	The Five-Year Engagement	co-production with Relativity Media, Apatow Productions and Stoller Global Solutions
May 18, 2012	Battleship	co-production with Hasbro Studios, Bluegrass Films and Film 44
June 1, 2012	Snow White and the Huntsman	co-production with Roth Films
June 8, 2012	A Fantastic Fear of Everything	international distribution only; co-production with Pinewood Films, Indomina Productions and Keel Films; distributed in the U.S. by Cinedigm
June 29, 2012	Ted	distribution only; produced by Media Rights Capital, Fuzzy Door Productions, Bluegrass Films and Smart Entertainment
June 29, 2012	Storage 24	distribution in the U.K., Ireland, the Benelux, Germany, Austria, the Nordics, Australia and New Zealand only; produced by Unstoppable Entertainment, Big Yellow Films and Medient Entertainment
July 6, 2012	Savages	co-production with Relativity Media and Ixtlan Productions; rights licensed to Pathé for France and Alternative Films for Belgium
July 27, 2012	Step Up Revolution	U.K., Irish, French, Swiss, Australian, New Zealand and Latin American distribution only; produced by Summit Entertainment and Offspring Entertainment
August 10, 2012	The Bourne Legacy	co-production with Relativity Media, The Kennedy/Marshall Company and Captivate Entertainment
October 5, 2012	Pitch Perfect	distribution outside Japan only; produced by Gold Circle Films and Brownstone
November 2, 2012	The Man with the Iron Fists	distribution only; produced by Strike Entertainment and Arcade Pictures
December 19, 2012	Zero Dark Thirty	distribution in the U.K., Ireland, South Africa, France, Germany, Austria, Switzerland, Italy, Spain, Andorra and the Nordics only; produced by Annapurna Pictures and First Light Productions; distributed in the U.S. by Columbia Pictures through Sony Pictures Releasing
December 21, 2012	This Is 40	co-production with Apatow Productions
December 25, 2012	Les Misérables	co-production with Relativity Media, Working Title Films and Cameron Mackintosh Ltd.

== 2013 ==
Release date	Title	Notes
January 18, 2013	Mama	distribution outside Canada only; produced by Double Dare You, Toma 78 and De Milo Productions
February 8, 2013	Identity Thief	co-production with Relativity Media, Bluegrass Films and Aggregate Films
April 19, 2013	Oblivion	co-production with Relativity Media, Chernin Entertainment, Monolith Pictures and Radical Studios
May 24, 2013	Fast & Furious 6	co-production with Relativity Media, Original Film and One Race Films
June 7, 2013	The Purge	distribution only; produced by Platinum Dunes, Blumhouse Productions and Why Not Productions
June 24, 2013	Thin Ice	distribution in Latin America, the U.K., Ireland, France, Spain, Italy, Germany, Austria, Scandinavia, the Benelux, Eastern Europe, Portugal, South Africa and Asia only; produced by Werc Werk Works
July 3, 2013	Despicable Me 2	co-production with Illumination Entertainment
July 19, 2013	R.I.P.D.	co-production with Original Film and Dark Horse Entertainment
August 2, 2013	2 Guns	U.S. distribution only; produced by Emmett/Furla Films, Marc Platt Productions, Oasis Ventures Entertainment, Envision Entertainment, Herrick Entertainment, Foresight Unlimited and Boom! Studios
August 16, 2013	Kick-Ass 2	distribution only; produced by Marv Films
August 23, 2013	The World's End	international distribution only; produced by Working Title Films and Big Talk Productions; distributed in North America by Focus Features
September 6, 2013	Riddick	U.S. distribution only; produced by One Race Films and Radar Pictures
September 20, 2013	Rush	U.S. distribution only; produced by Cross Creek Pictures, Exclusive Media, Imagine Entertainment, Revolution Films and Working Title Films
October 25, 2013	All Is Lost	international distribution outside Latin America, Germany, Austria, Greece, Cyprus, the Baltics, the Middle East, Israel, Turkey, India, Pakistan, China and Japan only; produced by Black Bear Pictures, FilmNation Entertainment, Treehouse Pictures, Before the Door Pictures and Washington Square Films; distributed in North America by Lionsgate and Roadside Attractions
November 1, 2013	About Time	distribution only; produced by Working Title Films and Relativity Media
November 1, 2013	Man of Tai Chi	international distribution outside Australia, New Zealand, Singapore and China only; co-production with Village Roadshow Pictures Asia, China Film Group, Wanda Media and Company Films; distributed in North America by RADiUS-TWC
November 14, 2013	Last Vegas	distribution in the U.K., Ireland, Australia, New Zealand, France, Germany, Austria, Switzerland, Italy, Spain, Andorra and Scandinavia only; produced by Good Universe and CBS Films
November 15, 2013	The Best Man Holiday	co-production with Blackmaled Productions and Sean Daniel Company
December 5, 2013	Oldboy	distribution in the U.K., Ireland, France, Germany, Austria, Switzerland, Italy, Spain, Australia and New Zealand only; produced by Good Universe, Vertigo Entertainment and 40 Acres and a Mule Filmworks; distributed in the U.S. by FilmDistrict
December 25, 2013	47 Ronin	co-production with Relativity Media, H2F Entertainment and Stuber Productions
December 25, 2013	Lone Survivor	U.S., U.K., Irish and Italian distribution only; produced by Emmett/Furla Films, Film 44, Herrick Entertainment, Envision Entertainment, Spikings Entertainment, Single Berry Productions, Closest to the Hole, Foresight Unlimited and Leverage Productions
December 25, 2013	The Wolf of Wall Street	distribution in the U.K., Ireland, Germany, Austria, Switzerland, Spain, Andorra and Scandinavia only; produced by Red Granite Pictures, Appian Way Productions and Sikelia Productions; distributed in North America and Japan by Paramount Pictures

== 2014 ==
Release date	Title	Notes
January 17, 2014	Ride Along	co-production with Relativity Media, Cube Vision and Rainforest Films
February 14, 2014	Endless Love	co-production with Bluegrass Films and Fake Empire
February 25, 2014	Blackfish	distribution in Latin America, Scandinavia, Central and Eastern Europe, Portugal, Italy, Africa and Asia only; produced by Manny O. Productions
February 28, 2014	Non-Stop	North American distribution only; produced by StudioCanal, Silver Pictures, TF1 Films Production, Canal+, TF1 and LoveFilm
May 9, 2014	Neighbors	distribution only; produced by Point Grey Pictures and Good Universe
May 30, 2014	A Million Ways to Die in the West	distribution only; produced by MRC, Fuzzy Door Productions and Bluegrass Films
July 11, 2014	Boyhood	international distribution outside France and the Benelux only; produced by IFC Productions, Detour Filmproduction and Cinetic Media
July 18, 2014	The Purge: Anarchy	distribution only; produced by Blumhouse Productions, Platinum Dunes and Why Not Productions
July 25, 2014	Lucy	distribution outside France, the Benelux, China and Hong Kong only; produced by EuropaCorp, TF1 Films Production, Canal+, Ciné+ and TF1
August 1, 2014	Get On Up	co-production with Imagine Entertainment, Jagged Films and Wyolah Films
August 8, 2014	Step Up: All In	U.K., Irish, French, Swiss, Australian, New Zealand and Latin American distribution only; produced by Summit Entertainment and Offspring Entertainment
August 29, 2014	As Above, So Below	distribution only; produced by Legendary Pictures and Brothers Dowdle
September 19, 2014	A Walk Among the Tombstones	U.S. distribution only; produced by Cross Creek Pictures, Exclusive Media, Endgame Entertainment, Jersey Films, Double Feature Films and 1984 Private Defense Contractors
October 10, 2014	Dracula Untold	co-production with Legendary Pictures and Michael De Luca Productions
October 17, 2014	Northern Soul	international distribution only; co-production with Stubborn Heart Films and Baby Cow Productions
October 24, 2014	Ouija	distribution only; produced by Platinum Dunes, Blumhouse Productions and Hasbro Studios
November 14, 2014	Dumb and Dumber To	distribution in North America, the U.K., Ireland, Australia, New Zealand, Germany, Austria, Switzerland and Spain only; produced by Red Granite Pictures, New Line Cinema and Conundrum Entertainment
November 26, 2014	The Theory of Everything	international distribution only; produced by Working Title Films; distributed in North America by Focus Features
December 25, 2014	Unbroken	co-production with Legendary Pictures, Jolie Pas and 3 Arts Entertainment

== 2015 ==
Release date	Title	Notes
January 16, 2015	Blackhat	distribution only; produced by Legendary Pictures and Forward Pass
January 23, 2015	The Boy Next Door	distribution only; produced by Blumhouse Productions, Smart Entertainment and Nuyorican Productions
February 6, 2015	Seventh Son	distribution outside China only; produced by Legendary Pictures, Thunder Road Films, Moving Picture Company, Outlaw Sinema, Pendle Mountain Productions and China Film Group
February 13, 2015	Fifty Shades of Grey	co-production with Focus Features, Michael De Luca Productions and Trigger Street Productions
April 3, 2015	Furious 7	co-production with MRC, Original Film and One Race Films
April 17, 2015	Unfriended	distribution outside the CIS only; produced by Blumhouse Productions and Bazelevs Company; rights licensed to Midship for Japan
April 24, 2015	Ex Machina	international distribution only; co-production with DNA Films, Film4 Productions and Scott Rudin Productions; distributed in North America by A24
May 15, 2015	Pitch Perfect 2	distribution only; produced by Gold Circle Entertainment and Brownstone
June 4, 2015	Horns	distribution in Germany, Austria, Switzerland, Spain and Scandinavia only; produced by Red Granite Pictures and Mandalay Pictures
June 12, 2015	Jurassic World	co-production with Amblin Entertainment, Legendary Pictures and The Kennedy/Marshall Company
June 26, 2015	Ted 2	distribution only; produced by MRC, Fuzzy Door Productions and Bluegrass Films
July 10, 2015	Minions	co-production with Illumination Entertainment
July 17, 2015	Trainwreck	co-production with Apatow Productions
August 14, 2015	Straight Outta Compton	co-production with Legendary Pictures, New Line Cinema, Cube Vision, Crucial Films and Broken Chair Flickz
September 11, 2015	The Visit	distribution only; produced by Blinding Edge Pictures and Blumhouse Productions
September 18, 2015	Everest	distribution only; produced by Cross Creek Pictures, Walden Media, Working Title Films, RVK Studios and Free State Pictures
September 25, 2015	The Green Inferno	U.S. co-distribution with BH Tilt and High Top Releasing only; produced by Worldview Entertainment, Dragonfly Entertainment and Sobras International Pictures
October 9, 2015	Steve Jobs	co-production with Legendary Pictures, Scott Rudin Productions, Entertainment 360, The Mark Gordon Company, Decibel Films and Cloud Eight Films
October 9, 2015	Trash	international distribution only; produced by Working Title Films, O2 Filmes and PeaPie films; distributed in the U.S. by Focus Features under the Focus World label
October 16, 2015	Crimson Peak	distribution only; produced by Legendary Pictures and DDY
October 23, 2015	Jem and the Holograms	distribution only; produced by Allspark Pictures, Hasbro Studios, Blumhouse Productions, Chu Studios and SB Projects
November 13, 2015	By the Sea	distribution only; produced by Jolie Pas and Plan B Entertainment
November 20, 2015	Legend	U.S. distribution only; produced by StudioCanal, Cross Creek Pictures, Working Title Films
November 27, 2015	The Danish Girl	international distribution only; produced by Working Title Films, Pretty Pictures, Revision Pictures and Senator Global Productions; distributed in North America by Focus Features
December 4, 2015	Krampus	distribution only; produced by Legendary Pictures and Zam Pictures
December 18, 2015	Sisters	co-production with Little Stranger and Everyman Pictures

== 2016 ==
Release date	Title	Notes
January 15, 2016	Ride Along 2	co-production with Will Packer Productions, Cube Vision and MBST Entertainment
February 5, 2016	Hail, Caesar!	distribution only; produced by Working Title Films and Mike Zoss Productions
February 19, 2016	The Witch	international distribution only; produced by Parts and Labor, RT Features, Rooks Nest Entertainment, Maiden Voyage Pictures, Mott Street Pictures, Code Red Productions, Scythia Films, Pulse Films and Special Projects; rights licensed to Interfilm in Japan, distributed in North America by A24
February 26, 2016	Secret in Their Eyes	distribution in the U.K., Ireland, Germany, Austria, France, Benelux and U.S. home media only; produced by Gran Via Productions, IM Global, Route One Entertainment, Site Productions, Union Investment Partners, Willies Movies AIE and Ingenious Media, distributed in the U.S. by STX Entertainment
March 25, 2016	My Big Fat Greek Wedding 2	distribution in North and Latin America, the U.K., Ireland, Australia, New Zealand, South Africa, the Nordics, Greece, Cyprus, Germany, Austria, Switzerland, Italy and Spain only; produced by Gold Circle Entertainment, HBO Films and Playtone
April 8, 2016	The Boss	co-production with On the Day Productions and Gary Sanchez Productions
April 22, 2016	The Huntsman: Winter's War	co-production with Perfect World Pictures and Roth Films
May 20, 2016	Neighbors 2: Sorority Rising	distribution only; produced by Point Grey Pictures and Good Universe
June 3, 2016	Popstar: Never Stop Never Stopping	co-production with Perfect World Pictures, Apatow Productions and The Lonely Island
June 10, 2016	Warcraft	distribution outside China only; produced by Legendary Pictures, Blizzard Entertainment, Atlas Entertainment, Tencent Pictures and China Film Group Corporation
June 17, 2016	Central Intelligence	international distribution only; co-production with New Line Cinema, RatPac Entertainment, Perfect World Pictures, Bluegrass Films and Principato-Young Entertainment; distributed in North America by Warner Bros. Pictures
July 1, 2016	The Purge: Election Year	distribution only; produced by Platinum Dunes, Blumhouse Productions and Man in a Tree Productions
July 8, 2016	The Secret Life of Pets	co-production with Illumination Entertainment
July 29, 2016	Jason Bourne	co-production with Perfect World Pictures, The Kennedy/Marshall Company, Captivate Entertainment and Pearl Street Films
September 16, 2016	Bridget Jones's Baby	distribution outside France, Germany and Austria only; produced by StudioCanal, Miramax and Working Title Films
October 7, 2016	The Girl on the Train	distribution in North and Latin America, Russia, Japan, Taiwan, Thailand, Laos, Cambodia, Malaysia, Singapore and the Philippines only; produced by DreamWorks Pictures, Reliance Entertainment and Marc Platt Productions
October 14, 2016	Kevin Hart: What Now?	North American distribution only; produced by HartBeat Productions
October 14, 2016	Ordinary World	distribution in the U.S., Latin America, the U.K., Ireland, Malta, France, Germany, Austria, Switzerland, Spain, the Benelux, Scandinavia, Eastern Europe, the Baltics, the CIS, Greece, Cyprus, Israel, Australia, New Zealand and India only; produced by Let It Play and Process Media
October 21, 2016	Ouija: Origin of Evil	co-production with Platinum Dunes, Blumhouse Productions, Allspark Pictures and Hasbro Studios
November 11, 2016	Almost Christmas	co-production with Perfect World Pictures and Will Packer Productions
December 9, 2016	Frank & Lola	co-distribution with Paladin only; produced by Parts and Labor, Killer Films, Lola Pictures, FullDawa Films, and Great Point Media
December 21, 2016	Sing	co-production with Illumination Entertainment

== 2017 ==
Release date	Title	Notes
January 20, 2017	Split	distribution only; produced by Blinding Edge Pictures and Blumhouse Productions
January 27, 2017	A Dog's Purpose	distribution in North and Latin America, Russia, Japan, Taiwan, Thailand, Malaysia, Singapore and the Philippines only; produced by Amblin Entertainment, Reliance Entertainment, Walden Media and Pariah
February 10, 2017	Fifty Shades Darker	co-production with Perfect World Pictures, Michael De Luca Productions and Trigger Street Productions
February 17, 2017	The Great Wall	distribution outside China only; produced by Legendary Pictures, Legendary East, China Film Group, Le Vision Pictures, Dentsu Inc., Fuji Television Network, Inc. and Atlas Entertainment
February 24, 2017	Get Out	Nominee of the Academy Award for Best Picture distribution only; produced by Blumhouse Productions, QC Entertainment and Monkeypaw Productions
April 14, 2017	The Fate of the Furious	co-production with Original Film, One Race Films and Chris Morgan Productions
June 9, 2017	The Mummy	co-production with Perfect World Pictures, Secret Hideout, Conspiracy Factory Productions, Sean Daniel Company and Chris Morgan Productions
June 30, 2017	Despicable Me 3	co-production with Illumination
July 21, 2017	Girls Trip	co-production with Perfect World Pictures and Will Packer Productions
September 29, 2017	American Made	distribution only; produced by Cross Creek Pictures, Imagine Entertainment, Vendian Entertainment, Quadrant Pictures and Hercules Film Fund
October 5, 2017	Woody Woodpecker	co-production with Universal Animation Studios and Universal 1440 Entertainment; Brazilian theatrical release
October 13, 2017	Happy Death Day	distribution only; produced by Blumhouse Productions
October 20, 2017	The Snowman	co-production with Perfect World Pictures, Working Title Films and Another Park Film
October 27, 2017	Thank You for Your Service	distribution in North and Latin America, Japan, Taiwan, Thailand, Malaysia, Singapore and the Philippines only; produced by DreamWorks Pictures, Reliance Entertainment and Rahway Road Productions
December 22, 2017	Pitch Perfect 3	co-production with Gold Circle Entertainment, Perfect World Pictures and Brownstone
December 22, 2017	The Post	Nominee of the Academy Award for Best Picture. distribution in Latin America, France, Germany, Austria, Switzerland, the CIS, Japan, Taiwan, Thailand, Malaysia, Singapore and the Philippines only; produced by 20th Century Fox, DreamWorks Pictures, Reliance Entertainment, Participant Media, Amblin Entertainment, Pascal Pictures and Star Thrower Entertainment

== 2018 ==
Release date	Title	Notes
January 5, 2018	Insidious: The Last Key	U.S. theatrical distribution only; produced by Stage 6 Films and Blumhouse Productions
February 9, 2018	Fifty Shades Freed	co-production with Perfect World Pictures, Michael De Luca Productions and Trigger Street Productions
March 23, 2018	Pacific Rim: Uprising	distribution outside China only; produced by Legendary Pictures, DDY Productions, UpperRoom Productions and Disruption Entertainment
April 6, 2018	Blockers	distribution only; produced by Good Universe, Point Grey Pictures, Hurwitz & Schlossberg Productions and DMG Entertainment
April 13, 2018	Truth or Dare	distribution only; produced by Blumhouse Productions
May 11, 2018	Breaking In	distribution only; produced by Will Packer Productions and Practical Pictures
June 22, 2018	Jurassic World: Fallen Kingdom	co-production with Amblin Entertainment, The Kennedy/Marshall Company, Legendary Pictures, Apaches Entertainment and Perfect World Pictures
July 4, 2018	The First Purge	co-production with Perfect World Pictures, Platinum Dunes, Blumhouse Productions and Man in a Tree Productions; co-distributed in Japan by Parco
July 13, 2018	Skyscraper	distribution outside China only; produced by Legendary Pictures, Flynn Picture Company and Seven Bucks Productions
July 20, 2018	Mamma Mia! Here We Go Again	co-production with Legendary Pictures, Perfect World Pictures, Playtone and Littlestar Productions
September 21, 2018	The House with a Clock in Its Walls	distribution in North and Latin America, France, Germany, Austria, Switzerland, the CIS, Japan, Taiwan, Thailand, Malaysia, Singapore and the Philippines only; produced by Amblin Entertainment, Reliance Entertainment and Mythology Entertainment
September 28, 2018	Night School	co-production with Perfect World Pictures, Will Packer Productions and HartBeat Productions
October 12, 2018	First Man	co-production with DreamWorks Pictures, Perfect World Pictures and Temple Hill Entertainment
October 19, 2018	Halloween	distribution only; produced by Miramax, Blumhouse Productions, Trancas International Films and Rough House Pictures; co-distributed in Japan by Parco
October 26, 2018	Johnny English Strikes Again	distribution outside French home media only; co-production with StudioCanal, Perfect World Pictures and Working Title Films
November 9, 2018	The Grinch	co-production with Illumination
November 16, 2018	Green Book	Winner of the Academy Award for Best Picture; North American distribution only; produced by DreamWorks Pictures, Participant Media, Innisfree Pictures and Cinetic Media
December 14, 2018	Mortal Engines	distribution only; produced by MRC, Scholastic Entertainment, Silvertongue Films, Perfect World Pictures and WingNut Films
December 21, 2018	Welcome to Marwen	co-production with DreamWorks Pictures, Perfect World Pictures and ImageMovers

== 2019 ==
Release date	Title	Notes
January 18, 2019	Glass	North American distribution only; produced by Blinding Edge Pictures, Blumhouse Productions and Perfect World Pictures; distributed internationally by Buena Vista International
February 13, 2019	Happy Death Day 2U	distribution only; produced by Blumhouse Productions
February 15, 2019	Fighting with My Family	home media and theatrical distribution outside the U.S., U.K., Ireland, Italy, Scandinavia, Portugal, Poland, Hungary, Romania, Bulgaria, the Czech Republic, Slovakia, the Middle East, Israel and South Africa only; produced by Metro-Goldwyn-Mayer, Film4, The Ink Factory, Seven Bucks Productions, Misher Films and WWE Studios; co-distributed in Japan by Parco
February 22, 2019	How to Train Your Dragon: The Hidden World	distribution only; produced by DreamWorks Animation; co-distributed in Japan by GAGA; first DreamWorks Animation film to be distributed by Universal Pictures
March 1, 2019	Apollo 11	international distribution only; produced by CNN Films and Statement Pictures; distributed in the U.S. by Neon
March 22, 2019	Us	co-production with Perfect World Pictures and Monkeypaw Productions
April 12, 2019	Little	co-production with Legendary Pictures, Perfect World Pictures and Will Packer Productions
May 10, 2019	The Hustle	home media and theatrical distribution outside the U.S., Italy, Scandinavia, Portugal, Poland, Hungary, Romania, Bulgaria, the Czech Republic, Slovakia, the Middle East, Israel and South Africa only; produced by Metro-Goldwyn-Mayer, Cave 76 Productions and Camp Sugar Productions
May 17, 2019	A Dog's Journey	distribution in North and Latin America, France, the CIS, Japan, Taiwan, Thailand, Malaysia, Singapore and the Philippines only; produced by Amblin Entertainment, Reliance Entertainment, Walden Media, Alibaba Pictures and Pariah Entertainment Group
May 31, 2019	Ma	distribution only; produced by Blumhouse Productions and Wyolah Films
June 7, 2019	The Secret Life of Pets 2	co-production with Illumination
June 28, 2019	Yesterday	co-production with Perfect World Pictures and Working Title Films
August 2, 2019	Fast & Furious Presents: Hobbs & Shaw	co-production with Chris Morgan Productions and Seven Bucks Productions
August 16, 2019	Good Boys	co-production with Good Universe and Point Grey Pictures
September 27, 2019	Abominable	distribution outside China only; produced by DreamWorks Animation and Pearl Studio
October 11, 2019	The Addams Family	home media and theatrical distribution outside the U.S., Italy, Scandinavia, Portugal, Poland, Hungary, Romania, Bulgaria, the Czech Republic, Slovakia, the Middle East, Israel and South Africa only; produced by Metro-Goldwyn-Mayer, Bron Creative, Creative Wealth Media Finance, Cinesite, Nitrogen Studios and The Jackal Group; co-distributed in Japan by Parco
November 8, 2019	Last Christmas	co-production with Perfect World Pictures, Calamity Films and Feigco Entertainment
November 27, 2019	Queen & Slim	distribution outside Canada, the U.K., Ireland, Spain and the Benelux only; produced by Entertainment One, Makeready, 3Blackdot, Bron Creative, De La Revolución Films and Hillman Grad Productions
December 8, 2019	Les Misérables: The Staged Concert	distribution only; produced by Cameron Mackintosh Ltd.
December 13, 2019	Black Christmas	distribution only; produced by Blumhouse Productions and Divide/Conquer
December 20, 2019	Cats	co-production with Perfect World Pictures, Working Title Films, Amblin Entertainment, Monumental Pictures and The Really Useful Group
December 25, 2019	1917	Nominee of the Academy Award for Best Picture distribution in North and Latin America, France, Germany, Austria, Switzerland, the CIS, Japan, Taiwan, Thailand, Malaysia, Singapore and the Philippines only; produced by DreamWorks Pictures, Reliance Entertainment, New Republic Pictures, Neal Street Productions and Mogambo

== See also ==
- List of Focus Features films
- List of Universal Pictures theatrical animated feature films
- Universal Pictures
- Category:Lists of films by studio
