= Akrivi =

Greek singer-songwriter

AKRIVI
- Born: Akrivi Nikokiridou, Ακριβή Nοικοκυρίδου; Thessaloniki, Greece
- Origin: Greece, UK
- Genres: Pop; EDM; electro house
- Occupations: Music artist, singer-songwriter, disck jockey
- Instrument: Vocals
- Years active: 2010 –present
- Labels: PGM, 314 Records
- Website: facebook.com/akrivimusic

Akrivi is a singer and songwriter, best known for her music contributions in series and films. Her music has been featured on US networks Showtime Networks, CBS, A&E, Freeform (TV channel), in various shows like The Good Wife, The Fosters (2013 TV series), The Glades, House of Lies, Younger (TV series), The Bold and the Beautiful and also in the Sony Pictures film The Night Before and Rough Night. She has released a double collection of her work in 2015, Precious Collection Volume 1 & 2, featuring songs in English, Greek and Spanish. Akrivi was born in Greece and has been residing in the United Kingdom.

== Early life ==
Born in Greece, Akrivi moved to the United Kingdom to study psychology.
