= Steven Weisberg =

American film editor (1955–2023)

- Publicity photo of Steven Weisberg
- Born: Steven Charles Weisberg; January 16, 1955; New York City, New York, U.S.
- Died: October 16, 2023 (aged 68); Woodland Hills, Los Angeles, U.S.
- Occupation: Film editor
- Years active: 1987–2012
- Notable work: Men in Black II; Harry Potter and the Prisoner of Azkaban
- Spouse: Susan Ellicott (m. 1996; div. 2008)

Steven Charles Weisberg (January 16, 1955 – October 16, 2023) was an American film editor known for his collaborations with directors Alfonso Cuarón and Barry Sonnenfeld.

== Life and career ==
Born in New York City, Weisberg was a graduate of Syracuse University and Binghamton University. He had two children with his wife, British journalist Susan Ellicott, whom he was married to from 1996 to 2008. His later partner was theater director Susan Stroman.

Weisberg earned his first credit as an associate editor on Gaby: A True Story (1987). He was diagnosed with early-onset Alzheimer's disease in 2010, and worked until 2012's Hope Springs. He died of complications from Alzheimer's at the Motion Picture & Television Country House and Hospital in Los Angeles, on October 16, 2023. He was 68.

== Filmography ==
Year	Film	Director
1987	Gaby: A True Story	Luis Mandoki
1990	The Color of Evening	Steve Stafford
1992	Mistress	Barry Primus
1995	Miami Rhapsody	David Frankel
1995	A Little Princess	Alfonso Cuarón
1996	The Cable Guy	Ben Stiller
1998	Great Expectations	Alfonso Cuarón
1998	Permanent Midnight	David Veloz
1999	Message in a Bottle	Luis Mandoki
2000	Nurse Betty	Neil LaBute
2002	Big Trouble	Barry Sonnenfeld
2002	Men in Black II	Barry Sonnenfeld
2003	I Am David	Paul Feig
2004	Harry Potter and the Prisoner of Azkaban	Alfonso Cuarón
2005	Asylum	David Mackenzie
2005	The Producers	Susan Stroman
2006	Man of the Year	Barry Levinson
2007	Mr. Magorium's Wonder Emporium	Zach Helm
2009	Mother and Child	Rodrigo García
2010	Morning Glory	Roger Michell
2011	Albert Nobbs	Rodrigo García
2012	Sir Billi	Sascha Hartmann
2012	Hope Springs	David Frankel

== Television ==
Year	Title	Director
1989	The Wickedest Witch	Steve Dubin
1989	Vietnam War Story: The Last Days	David Burton Morris; Sandy Smolan; Luis Soto
1993	Bakerfield P.D.	
1993	Last Light	Kiefer Sutherland
2001	The Tick	
