= Good Boys (film) =

2019 film by Gene Stupnitsky

- Theatrical release poster
- Directed by: Gene Stupnitsky
- Written by: Lee Eisenberg; Gene Stupnitsky
- Produced by: Lee Eisenberg; Evan Goldberg; Seth Rogen; James Weaver
- Starring: Jacob Tremblay; Keith L. Williams; Brady Noon; Molly Gordon; Lil Rel Howery; Midori Francis
- Cinematography: Jonathan Furmanski
- Edited by: Daniel Gabbe
- Music by: Lyle Workman
- Production companies: Good Universe; Point Grey Pictures; Quantity Entertainment
- Distributed by: Universal Pictures
- Release dates: March 11, 2019 (SXSW); August 16, 2019 (United States)
- Running time: 90 minutes
- Country: United States
- Language: English
- Budget: $20 million
- Box office: $111.2 million

Good Boys is a 2019 American coming-of-age comedy film directed by Gene Stupnitsky, in his directorial debut, and written by Stupnitsky and Lee Eisenberg. It stars Jacob Tremblay, Keith L. Williams, and Brady Noon as three sixth-graders who find themselves in a series of misadventures as they try to attend a party hosted by their popular classmates. Seth Rogen and Evan Goldberg produced the film through their Point Grey Pictures company.

The film premiered at South by Southwest in Austin, Texas. on March 11, 2019, and was theatrically released in the United States on August 16, 2019 by Universal Pictures. It received generally positive reviews and was a box-office success, grossing $111 million worldwide on a $20 million budget.

== Plot ==
Best friends Max, Lucas, and Thor enter sixth grade facing their own personal dilemmas: Max has a crush on their classmate Brixlee, Lucas learns his parents are getting divorced, and Thor experiences bullying from his peers which discourages him from pursuing his love of singing. When presented with the opportunity to kiss Brixlee at a party hosted by popular student Soren, as none of them has any experience, Max and his friends use his father's prized drone to spy on his teenage neighbor Hannah in an attempt to learn proper kissing. This happens after Thor convinces Max to use it, despite repeated warnings to not touch it. The plan goes wrong and results in the drone being destroyed and the boys in possession of Hannah's ecstasy.

To avoid getting grounded, the trio cut school to buy a new drone at the local mall, with Hannah and her friend Lily in pursuit. Amid a series of escapades, Max, Lucas, and Thor reach the mall, but they learn that Hannah and Lily bought the drone and will only give it to the boys in exchange for their ecstasy. Having surrendered the drugs to a police officer, the boys manage to obtain new ecstasy from Hannah's ex-boyfriend Benji and trade it for the drone.

Nevertheless, Max is unable to prevent his father from finding out that he used the drone and is grounded. An argument ensues between the friends and the three go their separate ways, although Max takes the blame for what transpired to prevent Thor and Lucas from getting in trouble. When Lucas speaks to his parents about the potential end of his friendships, they advise him that he, Max, and Thor are growing apart.

That night, Lucas convinces Max to sneak out to attend the party, tricking him into also meeting up with Thor in the process. Max successfully kisses Brixlee while Thor and Lucas re-encounter Hannah and Lily, the latter revealed as Soren's sister. The two encourage Thor to continue his passion for singing.

In the ensuing weeks, Thor lands the role of Stacee Jaxx in the school's amateur production of Rock of Ages, Lucas joins the school's anti-bullying group, and Max begins dating his classmate Scout after his relationships with Brixlee and then her friend Taylor end in heartbreak. Following a performance of the school musical, Max, Lucas, and Thor reconcile and promise to remain in each other's lives.

== Cast ==
- Jacob Tremblay as Max
- Keith L. Williams as Lucas
- Brady Noon as Thor
- Molly Gordon as Hannah
- Midori Francis as Lily
- Izaac Wang as Soren
- Millie Davis as Brixlee
- Josh Caras as Benji
- Will Forte as Max's dad
- Lil Rel as Lucas' dad
- Retta as Lucas' mom
- Michaela Watkins as saleswoman
- Macie Juiles as Taylor
- Sam Richardson as Officer Sacks
- Zoriah Wong as Scout

Co-writer and co-producer Lee Eisenberg also appears as a character named Leigh Eisenberg. Mariessa Portelance plays Amy Newman, Max's mother, Enid-Raye Adams plays Thor's mother, Benita Ha plays Lily's and Soren's mother, and Lina Renna plays Thor's sister Annabelle. The boys' classmates Marcus and Atticus are played by Christian Darrel Scott and Chance Hurstfield, respectively, while Alexander Calvert plays fraternity brother Daniel. Stephen Merchant makes an uncredited appearance as Claude, the man who purchases a sex doll from the boys.

== Production ==
On August 16, 2017, it was announced that Seth Rogen's Point Grey Pictures and Good Universe would produce a comedy film by writers Lee Eisenberg and Gene Stupnitsky in their directorial debuts. The film was produced by Rogen, Evan Goldberg, James Weaver, Nathan Kahane and Joe Drake. In March 2018, Jacob Tremblay was cast in the film, titled Good Boys, to which Universal Pictures bought the distribution rights.

The film was shot in Vancouver, Maple Ridge, Surrey, Langley, and Abbotsford in British Columbia, Canada. Stupnitsky received sole director credit.

=== Cinematography ===
The highway scene was filmed at an airport runway. Most of the elements in this screenshot were achieved via visual effects. Anamorphic lenses were used to achieve the film's wide scope.

Jonathan Furmanski, who had worked on Search Party, Inside Amy Schumer, and The Zen Diaries of Garry Shandling, was enlisted as the film's cinematographer. He took inspiration from Stand By Me, The Goonies, and E.T., aiming to have "one foot in 2019 and the other in 1986 (Stand By Me's release date)." He arrived at Vancouver a month before principal photography, allowing him to discuss more about the style of the film. The "universal agreement" is that Good Boys shouldn't look like a "typical" pre-teen comedy, that it should feel "bigger and more open" despite its tight premise.

Furmanski filmed Good Boys with Arri Alexa SXT and Alexa Mini cameras equipped with Arri Master Anamorphic lenses. The 2.39:1 anamorphic aspect ratio was used to achieve the wide scope of the film; Furmanski explained the Master Anamorphics were "the perfect choice: a big look, great contrast and color rendition, lovely depth and separation, and clean and sharp across the frame." To avoid making the set overheated and claustrophobic, lights were kept out of the room or rigged overhead. He said that the scene where the boys paintball-fight with grown-ups was shot in one take.

The "biggest" and most challenging scene Furmanski shot was the scene of the boys running across the highway, using multiple units and taking over five days to achieve: three days of filming and two days of stunt and visual effects. Almost every shot in the scene featured visual effects. It was shot at a makeshift 300-foot highway on an unused airport runway; the crew were not able to film at a real highway due to active traffic. He credited first assistant director Dan Miller and key grip Marc Nolet for achieving the scene. According to Furmanski, Nolet "drilled small washers into the tarmac for every camera position and we took copious notes so we could go back if necessary, or second unit could come in and replicate something."

== Music ==
The film features the following songs:

- "Walking on Sunshine" by Katrina and the Waves
- "Go to Town" by Doja Cat
- "Valentine" by YK Osiris
- "Multi Millionaire" (feat. Lil Uzi Vert) by Lil Pump
- "Nightmare" (feat. Pusha T & Barrington Levy) by Yellow Claw
- "Race with the Devil (Guy Mitchell song) Race with the Devil" by Judas Priest

== Release ==
Good Boys had its world premiere at South by Southwest in Austin, Texas, on March 11, 2019. The film was released theatrically in the United States on August 16, 2019, by Universal Pictures.

=== Home media ===
Good Boys was released on Digital HD on October 29, 2019, and on DVD and Blu-ray on November 12, 2019.

== Reception ==
=== Box office ===
Good Boys grossed $83.1 million in the United States and Canada, and $28 million in other countries, for a worldwide total of $111.2 million. Deadline Hollywood calculated the net profit of the film to be $39 million, when factoring together all expenses and revenues.

In the United States and Canada, Good Boys was projected to gross $12–15 million from 3,204 theaters in its opening weekend. It made $8.3 million on its first day, including $2.1 million from Thursday night previews. It overperformed and went on to debut to $21 million, becoming the first R-rated comedy since The Boss for three years to finish first at the box office. The film made $11.6 million in its second weekend and $9.5 million in its third, finishing second behind Angel Has Fallen both times.

=== Critical response ===
On Rotten Tomatoes, the film holds an approval rating of 81% based on 247 reviews, with an average rating of 6.5/10. The website's critical consensus reads, "Good Boys is undermined by an eagerness to repeatedly indulge in profane humor, but its appealing cast and ultimately thoughtful message often shine through." Metacritic, which uses a weighted average, assigned the film a score of 60 out of 100, based on 44 critics, indicating "mixed or average" reviews. Audiences polled by CinemaScore gave the film an average grade of "B+" on an A+ to F scale, while those at PostTrak gave it an 83% overall positive score, with 61% saying they would definitely recommend it.

Critic Richard Roeper of the Chicago Sun-Times gave the film a rating of three stars out of four, who commented that "for all its wacky, gross-out, shock-ya humor, Good Boys has a lot of heart." Two National Review writers share slightly opposing views. Kyle Smith opined it as "engaging" in its mish-mash of innocence and naughtiness. He called the film a good depiction of juvenile delinquency, noting however its predictability and nonsensical humor, and calling it "so thin on plot that, even at 90 minutes, things feel a bit stretched." Meanwhile, Armond White said that the film has a "rush-to-perdition premise", marking it a "step down from Freaks and Geeks and Superbad". He looked on the main characters as "the worst example of media brats", and the film's ambition to make it as profane as possible made for a hypocritical and "smut-peddling" work. He called the scene of Thor performing Rock of Ages "the single most mawkish and dishonest movie ending so far this year."

=== Accolades ===
The film was nominated at the People's Choice Awards in the "Favorite Comedy Movie of 2019" category, but lost to Murder Mystery.

== See also ==
- List of films featuring drones
