= Mandate Pictures =

Film company

Mandate Pictures, LLC
- Formerly: Senator International (2000–2006)
- Type: Subsidiary
- Industry: Motion pictures
- Founded: 2000 (original; as Senator International)
- Founders: Joseph Drake; Nathan Kahane
- Defunct: 2013 (original)
- Headquarters: Santa Monica, California, United States
- Key people: Joseph Drake (Founder and CEO); Nathan Kahane (President); Brian Goldsmith
- Parent: Lionsgate Films (2007–2013; 2025–present)
- Divisions: Grindstone Entertainment Group

Mandate Pictures was an independent film production company that was acquired by Lionsgate in 2007.

== History ==
In 2005, Mandate Pictures was officially formed when the Los Angeles–based Senator International completed a management buyout from German indie giant Senator Entertainment AG. Joe Drake, Brian Goldsmith and Nathan Kahane became the sole proprietors of Mandate Pictures. At the time, the company was helmed by President Joe Drake, chief financial officer Brian Goldsmith, and Nathan Kahane as the company's President of Motion Pictures, overseeing the daily creative operations of the new company. Mandate Pictures independently produced and financed feature films by leveraging international sales, while seeking out domestic distributors on a film by film basis.

On September 10, 2007, the partners sold Mandate Pictures to Lionsgate, and as part of that deal, Kahane stayed on as President of Mandate Pictures, while Mandate CEO Joe Drake became President of the Motion Picture Group and Co-Chief Operating Officer at Lionsgate. After the acquisition, Mandate operated as an independent brand under Drake and Kahane, releasing commercial and independent films worldwide while retaining the creative autonomy and capital to finance, develop, package and produce theatrical films.

In the spring of 2012, Drake and Kahane launched Good Universe, a new full-service motion picture financing, production and global sales company. The launch comes as the collaborators transition out of Lionsgate, opening its doors fully staffed and with films from the development slate at predecessor company Mandate Pictures. Good Universe will work with Lionsgate to complete a number of Mandate films and provide certain management and production services on a number of Mandate library properties.

== Logo ==
The drummer girl in the logo is Georgia Rock, who later starred in the 2013 film, The Bling Ring.

== Filmography ==
=== Senator International ===
- Death to Smoochy (2002) (released by Warner Bros. Pictures and FilmFour)
- The Grudge (2004) (released by Columbia Pictures and Ghost House Pictures)
- Harold & Kumar Go to White Castle (2004) (released by New Line Cinema)
- White Noise (2005) (released by Universal Pictures and Gold Circle Films)
- Boogeyman (2005) (released by Screen Gems and Ghost House Pictures)
- Lords of Dogtown (2005) (released by Columbia Pictures and TriStar Pictures)

=== Mandate Pictures ===
==== 2000s ====
- Neverwas (2005) (released by Miramax Films)
- The Wedding Date (2005) (released by Universal Pictures)
- White Noise (2005) (released by Universal Pictures)
- Stranger than Fiction (2006) (released by Columbia Pictures)
- The Grudge 2 (2006) (released by Columbia Pictures)
- The Messengers (2007) (released by Columbia Pictures and Screen Gems)
- Saw IV (2007) (released by Lionsgate)
- Rise: Blood Hunter (2007) (released by Samuel Goldwyn Films and Destination Films)
- Sleuth (2007) (released by Sony Pictures Classics)
- Juno (2007) (released by Fox Searchlight Pictures)
- Why Did I Get Married? (2007) (released by Lionsgate)
- Mr. Magorium's Wonder Emporium (2007) (released by 20th Century Fox and Walden Media)
- 30 Days of Night (2007) (released by Columbia Pictures)
- Because I Said So (2007) (released by Universal Pictures)
- Harold & Kumar Escape from Guantanamo Bay (2008) (released by New Line Cinema)
- The Eye (2008) (released by Lionsgate and Paramount Vantage)
- My Best Friend's Girl (2008) (released by Lionsgate)
- The Strangers (2008) (released by Rogue Pictures)
- Passengers (2008) (released by TriStar Pictures)
- The Family That Preys (2008) (released by Lionsgate)
- Nick & Norah's Infinite Playlist (2008) (released by Columbia Pictures)
- Saw V (2008) (released by Lionsgate)
- Horsemen (2009) (released by Lionsgate)
- Drag Me to Hell (2009) (released by Universal Pictures)
- Brüno (2009) (released by Universal Pictures)
- Whip It (2009) (released by Fox Searchlight Pictures)
- The Imaginarium of Doctor Parnassus (2009) (released by Sony Pictures Classics)
- Daybreakers (2009) (released by Lionsgate)
- Shrink (2009) (released by Roadside Attractions)
- My Bloody Valentine 3D (2009) (released by Lionsgate)
- New in Town (2009) (released by Lionsgate)
- Madea Goes to Jail (2009) (released by Lionsgate)
- The Men Who Stare at Goats (2009) (released by Overture Films)
- Brothers (2009) (released by Lionsgate)
- The Haunting in Connecticut (2009) (released by Lionsgate)
- Saw VI (2009) (released by Lionsgate)

==== 2010s ====
- Peacock (2010)
- The Switch (2010) (released by Miramax Films)
- 50/50 (2011) (released by Summit Entertainment)
- A Very Harold & Kumar 3D Christmas (2011) (released by Warner Bros. Pictures and New Line Cinema)
- Young Adult (2011) (released by Paramount Pictures)
- LOL (2012) (released by Lionsgate Films)
- Seeking A Friend for the End of the World (2012) (released by Focus Features and Indian Paintbrush)
- Hope Springs (2012) (released by Columbia Pictures, Metro-Goldwyn-Mayer and Escape Artists)
- This Is the End (2013) (released by Columbia Pictures and Point Grey Pictures)
- Paradise (2013) (released by Image Entertainment)

==== 2020s ====
- Untitled Harold & Kumar film (TBA)
