= Ibiza (film) =

2018 film by Alex Richanbach

- Release poster
- Directed by: Alex Richanbach
- Written by: Lauryn Kahn
- Produced by: Kevin Messick; Nathan Kahane; Erin Westerman; Will Ferrell; Adam McKay
- Starring: Gillian Jacobs; Vanessa Bayer; Phoebe Robinson; Michaela Watkins; Jordi Mollà; Richard Madden
- Cinematography: Danny Moder
- Edited by: Josh Salzberg
- Music by: Jeff Morrow
- Production companies: Gary Sanchez Productions; Good Universe
- Distributed by: Netflix
- Release date: May 25, 2018
- Running time: 94 minutes
- Country: United States
- Language: English

Ibiza (later retitled Ibiza: Love Drunk) is a 2018 American romantic comedy film directed by Alex Richanbach and written by Lauryn Kahn. Its story follows Harper, a 30-year-old woman from New York who travels to Barcelona on business; there she has a flirty encounter with a famous DJ and undertakes a spontaneous trip to Ibiza. It stars Gillian Jacobs, Vanessa Bayer, Phoebe Robinson, Michaela Watkins, Jordi Mollà, and Richard Madden.

The film was produced by Gary Sanchez Productions and Good Universe and was released on Netflix on May 25, 2018. It received mixed reviews from critics.

== Plot ==
Harper is weary of life in New York City working for a PR firm. Her boss Sarah is constantly reciting nasty one-liners at her while failing to recognize her hard work. In a surprise move, Sarah informs Harper that she has to fly to Barcelona for the weekend in order to secure a new client. Harper sees it as an opportunity for her to finally show her worth. Her best friends Nikki and Leah insist on coming along.

Diego, one of the clients in Barcelona, flirts with Nikki and invites the women to a nightclub. There, Harper meets the attractive DJ, superstar Leo West, with whom she has instant chemistry. A man at the club invites the three friends to his place for a party, implying that Leo will be there. Their host promises drugs and the possibility of freeing sexual experiences, but they have to suddenly leave when Leah unknowingly fools around with a married man and his wife chases them out with a knife.

Before Harper and Leo get a chance to spend any time together, he has to travel to Ibiza for his next gig. Harper has received many missed calls and messages from her boss, but she does not call back right away. The pressure prompts her impulsive decision to fly to Ibiza to meet Leo, despite her work responsibilities and egged on by her friends, to secure the man of her dreams.

The three friends arrive in Ibiza, and get sidetracked several times. They are dropped off at a spot to watch the sunset and are then stuck there for ages. The taxi driver who finally picks them up randomly brings them to his house, where they hang out for a while, and later head out in his limousine.

Harper finally calls her boss, finding out that the time of her meeting with the client has changed to the morning. She tries to call Leo, but it goes to voicemail, and the message does not get sent. Simultaneously, he leaves her a voicemail expressing his interest.

At the club, Harper finally reunites with Leo, and she talks him into ending his session early so they can then spend a romantic night together before her return to Barcelona. The next day, Harper wakes late, she and Leo separate after a rushed trip to the airport and she misses the flight.

Meanwhile, Nikki secures the deal by impersonating Harper with Leah's and Diego's help. However, Harper's boss videocalls the meeting and sees Nikki sitting in for Harper. Back in New York, she is fired and starts her own PR firm, poaching clients from her ex-boss.

Later, Harper receives a call from Leo, who invites her to meet him at a gig in Tokyo. She declines, instead requesting he visit her in New York. Leo agrees and they both confess their feelings for each other. When Harper informs her friends of Leo's call, they tell her that she should have visited Leo, which she disagrees with. That night while on the subway, Harper smiles to herself over her future meeting with him.

== Cast ==
- Gillian Jacobs as Harper
- Vanessa Bayer as Nikki
- Phoebe Robinson as Leah
- Richard Madden as Leo West
- Michaela Watkins as Sarah
- Félix Gómez Hernández as Diego
- Jordi Mollà as Hernando
- Augustus Prew as Miles
- Anthony Welsh as Peter
- Humphrey Ker as James
- Miguel Ángel Silvestre as Manny

== Production ==
In April 2014, Sony Pictures acquired a romantic comedy spec script written by Lauryn Kahn, with Alex Richanbach directing, under the working title I'm in Love with the DJ. Will Ferrell, Adam McKay, and Kevin Messick served as producers under their Gary Sanchez Productions banner. In June 2017, Gillian Jacobs, Vanessa Bayer and Phoebe Robinson joined the cast of the film, with Netflix producing and distributing instead of Sony. Nathan Kahane and Erin Westerman served as producers under their Good Universe banner. In August 2017, Richard Madden joined the cast of the film.

=== Filming ===
Principal photography began on September 5, 2017. The film was shot mostly in Croatia and Serbia. Split and Zrće in Croatia doubled as Barcelona, while most Ibiza scenes were filmed in Krk, Croatia.

== Reception ==
On Rotten Tomatoes, the film holds an approval rating of 67% based on 24 reviews, with an average rating of 6.3/10. The critical consensus reads: "Ibiza settles into an amiable comedic groove enlivened by its talented stars, even if the end result is fittingly somewhat narratively hazy." On Metacritic, Ibiza scored 56 out of 100, based on 11 critics, indicating "mixed or average" reviews.

== Controversy ==
The filmmakers sought cooperation with the local government of Ibiza, but the film was opposed by the Consell d'Eivissa, and the film was ultimately filmed in Croatia. Around the time of release, Ibiza island authorities were reportedly preparing a lawsuit against Netflix for abusing the Ibiza brand and for allegedly depicting a stereotypical and unfavorable image of the island.
