= Mr. Magorium's Wonder Emporium =

- Theatrical release poster
- Directed by: Zach Helm
- Written by: Zach Helm
- Produced by: Richard N. Gladstein; James Garavente
- Starring: Dustin Hoffman; Natalie Portman; Jason Bateman
- Narrated by: Zach Mills
- Cinematography: Roman Osin
- Edited by: Sabrina Plisco; Steven Weisberg
- Music by: Alexandre Desplat; Aaron Zigman
- Production companies: Mandate Pictures; Walden Media; FilmColony
- Distributed by: 20th Century Fox (United States/Canada); Mandate Pictures (International)
- Release date: November 16, 2007 (United States)
- Running time: 93 minutes
- Countries: United States; Canada
- Language: English
- Budget: $65 million
- Box office: $69.5 million

Mr. Magorium's Wonder Emporium is a 2007 American family fantasy comedy film written and directed by Zach Helm (in his directorial debut), produced by FilmColony, Mandate Pictures, Walden Media, Richard N. Gladstein and James Garavente, and with music composed by Alexandre Desplat and Aaron Zigman. The film stars Dustin Hoffman as the owner of a magical toy store whose abnormally long life will end soon, and Natalie Portman as his employee and successor. A cameo by Kermit the Frog was the character's first major theatrical appearance since 1999's Muppets from Space.

Theatrically released on November 16, 2007 by 20th Century Fox, it received mixed reviews and was unsuccessful at the box office, grossing $69.5 million worldwide. Helm subsequently disowned the film in later years.

== Plot ==
Molly Mahoney, a former musical prodigy suffering from artist's block, is an amateur pianist and an employee at "Mr. Magorium's Wonder Emporium", a magical toy shop run by 243-year-old Mr. Edward Magorium. Working alongside her is the store bookbuilder, strongman Bellini. Eric Applebaum is a boy who comes to the store daily and functions as an employee despite his age. While taking the transit to and from work, Molly often mimes playing the piano as part of her creative process, and the melodies she imagines are audible.

Magorium gives Molly the Congreve Cube, a block of wood, and tells her it will guide her to a new life if she has faith in it. Molly wants to become a concert pianist and composer, but has not been able to complete her first concerto.

Magorium announces that he intends to "leave" and give the shop to Molly. In preparation of his departure, he hires an accountant, Henry Weston, to organize the shop's paperwork and determine his legacy to Molly. Henry does not believe the toy store is magical.

When Molly becomes upset about her inability to properly run the store, the Emporium "throws a tantrum", assaulting everyone inside with the toys until Magorium calms it down. Molly realizes that Magorium is going to die, so she rushes him to a hospital, only to learn there is nothing wrong with him. She attempts to prevent Magorium's departure by showing him the joys of life, but he assures her he has already lived a full life. Back at the store, Magorium uses the stage notes of Shakespeare's King Lear to make a point about the natural simplicity of death, hints at possibly reincarnating, and gives Molly a motivational speech before dying. Still believing herself incapable of running the store, Molly puts the Emporium up for sale, and it loses all its magic.

Henry, who has been forming a friendly bond with Eric, meets Molly to draw up the sales papers. He sees the Congreve Cube and asks her about it. When Molly confesses her complete faith in the store, the block flies around the store. Witnessing this, Henry faints with shock. When he awakes and questions Molly, she tells him that it was a dream. He learns that Molly made the cube fly, and he believes in her, realizing Molly can be anything if she believes in herself. Molly's confidence increases as it is revealed that she can literally produce music without instruments by magic; she conducts her completed concerto with full orchestration, returning the store to its former glory, while Henry finally lets the living merchandise accept him.

In a post-credits scene, Magorium is seen painting The Son of Man on a wall. A boy named Milo approves of his work.

== Cast ==
- Dustin Hoffman as Mr. Edward Magorium, the toy store's eccentric 243-year-old owner
- Natalie Portman as Molly Mahoney, the store manager, and former child piano prodigy, who feels "stuck" in life
- Jason Bateman as Henry Weston (aka "Mutant"), the straight-laced, rigid accountant hired to get Mr. Magorium's paperwork in order
- Zach Mills as Eric Applebaum, a lonely 9-year-old with a large assortment of hats and headgear who comes to the store regularly, functions as an employee, and has trouble making friends
- Ted Ludzik as Bellini, the bookbinder who was born in the shop's basement and writes Mr. Magorium's biography
- Jonathan Potts as a hospital doctor
- Kiele Sanchez as Mrs. Goodman, a customer
- Steve Whitmire as Kermit the Frog in a cameo appearance

== Production ==
Principal photography was shot from March 31 to June 6, 2006, in Toronto, Ontario, Canada. The film was produced by FilmColony's Richard N. Gladstein and Gang of Two's James Garavente, and financed by Walden Media, and Mandate Pictures's Joe Drake and Nathan Kahane. Playmobile, Hot Wheels, and the Sock Monkey appear as famous toys.

== Novelization ==
Written by Suzanne Weyn, the novelization, named the "Magical Movie Novel" on its cover, was published on October 1, 2007 by Scholastic Inc.

== Release ==
The film was released in the United States and Canada on November 16, 2007, by 20th Century Fox, under their "Fox-Walden" joint-venture with Walden Media. International sales were handled by Mandate Pictures.

The premiere of Mr Magorium's Wonder Emporium, attended by Natalie Portman and Dustin Hoffman, also doubled as a fundraising event with tickets having been made available to the public. Funds raised at the event were donated to the Barnardo's children's charity and other charities based in the United Kingdom.

To promote the film, the Los Angeles Times ran a scratch and sniff advertisement with a frosted cake smell.

=== Home media ===
Mr. Magorium's Wonder Emporium was released on DVD and Blu-ray on March 4, 2008, by 20th Century Fox Home Entertainment in the U.S.

== Reception ==
=== Box office ===
The film grossed $9.6 million in 3,164 theaters on its opening weekend, ranking #5 at the box office. It went on to gross $32.1 million in the U.S., and a further $35.4 million in the rest of the world, which gives the film a box office total of $67.5 million.

=== Critical response ===
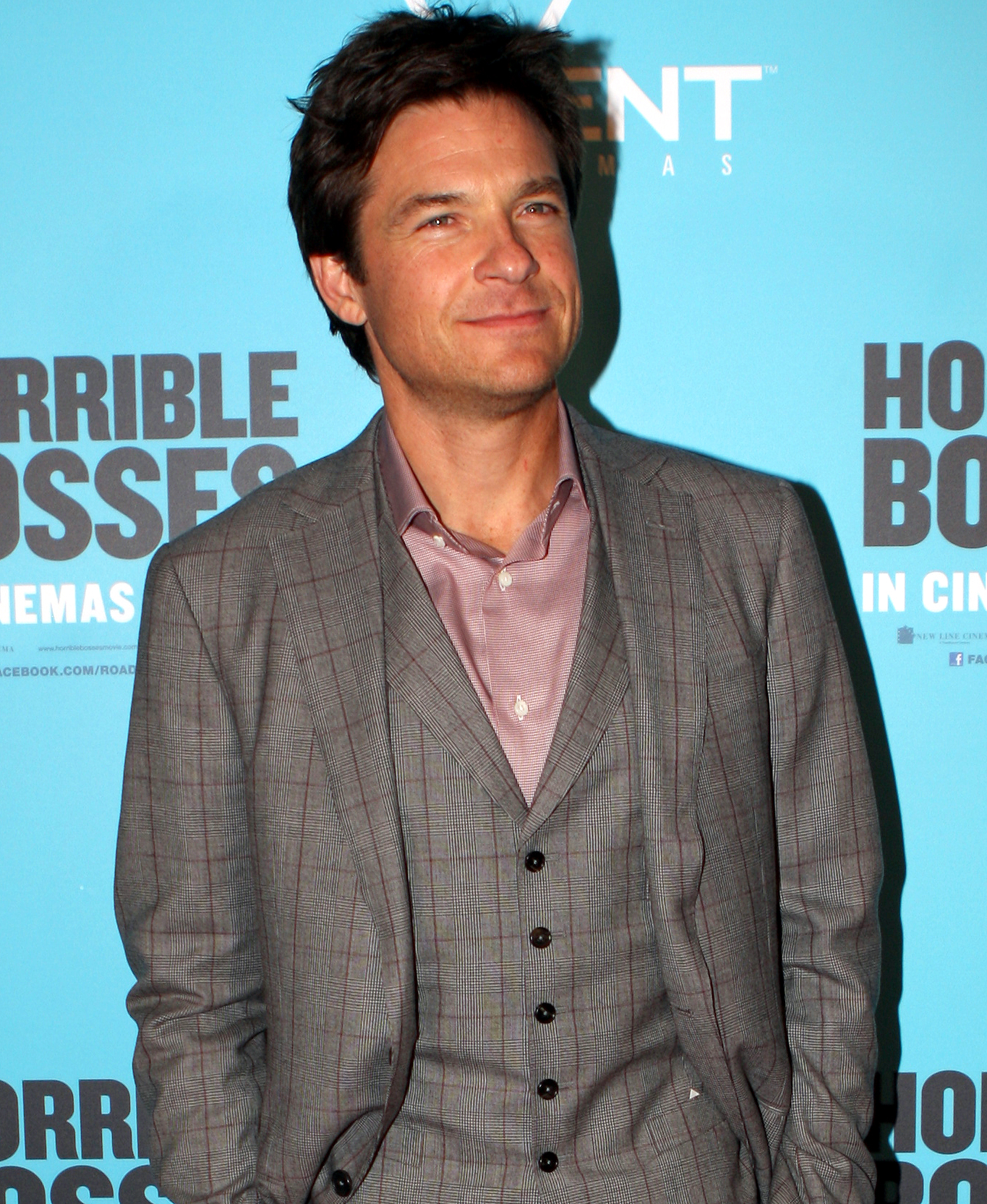
Jason Bateman was praised by critics for his performance.

On the review aggregator Rotten Tomatoes, 40% of critics gave the film positive reviews based on 124 reviews, with an average rating of 5.20/10. The consensus reads, "Mr. Magorium's Wonder Emporium's title is much more fun than the film itself, as colorful visuals and talented players can't make up for a bland story." On Metacritic, the film had an average score of 48 out of 100, based on 26 reviews. Audiences polled by CinemaScore gave the film an average grade of "B+" on an A+ to F scale. Peter Travers of Rolling Stone declared the film the year's Worst Family Film on his list of the Worst Movies of 2007.

Roger Ebert of the Chicago Sun-Times gave the film 3 stars out of 4 and wrote: "This isn't quite the over-the-top fantasy you'd like it to be, but it's a charming enough little movie, and probably the younger you are, the more charming." In recognition of the fact that it was "aimed directly at very young children", William Arnold of the Seattle Post-Intelligencer observed its "unforced and exceedingly gentle humor, its imaginative but never-quite-excessive production design and its ingratiating and surprisingly detailed performances – especially by Portman and Bateman – gradually break down one's cynical defenses".

Writer-director Zach Helm later disowned the film, calling it a "Technicolor train-wreck", after the film was referenced in an episode of the AMC drama Breaking Bad.

== Accolades ==
For his performance in the film, Zach Mills was nominated for a Young Artist Award for Best Performance in a Feature Film – Leading Young Actor.

The film has won two awards: the Heartland Film Festival Truly Moving Pictures award; and the Dove Foundation Seal of Approval, whose presenters felt it was "a delightful film". Shawn Edwards of Fox called it "the most magical film of the year".

List of awards and nominations
Award	Category	Nominee	Result
Golden Trailer	Best Animation/Family	—	Nominated
IFMCA Award	Best Original Score for a Fantasy/Science Fiction Film	Alexander Desplat and Aaron Zigman	Nominated
Young Artist Award	Best Performance in a Feature Film - Leading Young Actor	Zach Mills	Nominated

== Soundtrack ==
The score was composed by Alexandre Desplat and Aaron Zigman, and was released on November 13, 2007. The album includes the song, "Love the World You Find", performed by the Flaming Lips.

Kaela Kimura's "Jasper" is the theme song for the Japanese version.
