= Long Shot (2019 film) =

2019 film by Jonathan Levine

- Theatrical release poster
- Directed by: Jonathan Levine
- Screenplay by: Dan Sterling; Liz Hannah
- Story by: Dan Sterling
- Produced by: Charlize Theron; A.J. Dix; Beth Kono; Evan Goldberg; Seth Rogen; James Weaver
- Starring: Seth Rogen; Charlize Theron; O'Shea Jackson Jr.; Andy Serkis; June Diane Raphael; Bob Odenkirk; Alexander Skarsgård
- Cinematography: Yves Bélanger
- Edited by: Melissa Bretherton; Evan Henke
- Music by: Marco Beltrami; Miles Hankins
- Production companies: Summit Entertainment; Good Universe; Point Grey Pictures; Denver + Delilah Productions
- Distributed by: Lionsgate
- Release dates: March 9, 2019 (SXSW); May 3, 2019 (United States)
- Running time: 124 minutes
- Country: United States
- Language: English
- Budget: $40 million
- Box office: $53.9 million

Long Shot is a 2019 American romantic comedy film directed by Jonathan Levine and written by Dan Sterling and Liz Hannah. The plot follows a journalist (Seth Rogen) who reunites with his former babysitter (Charlize Theron), now the United States Secretary of State. O'Shea Jackson Jr., Andy Serkis, June Diane Raphael, Bob Odenkirk, and Alexander Skarsgård also star.

The film had its world premiere at South by Southwest on March 9, 2019, and was theatrically released in the United States on May 3, 2019, by Lionsgate. It received generally positive reviews, with praise for the chemistry between Rogen and Theron. Long Shot grossed $53.9 million against a budget of $40 million.

== Plot ==
United States Secretary of State Charlotte Field learns from President Chambers, a former television actor, that he does not plan on running for a second term, as he is trying to break into the movie industry. Seeing an opportunity, she convinces him to endorse her as a potential presidential candidate.

Meanwhile, New York City journalist Fred Flarsky furiously quits from the newspaper he works for, upon learning it has been bought by Parker Wembley, a wealthy media mogul whose Republican politics oppose his Democratic ideology. He cannot find another job afterwards and becomes depressed. Fred later turns to his more successful best friend, Lance, who takes him to a charity fundraising event where Boyz II Men are performing. Coincidentally, Charlotte is also there. She and Fred recognize each other, as she was his babysitter, and he was secretly infatuated with her when they were teenagers. While they catch up, Parker interrupts them to plan a meeting with Charlotte, leading Fred to loudly condemn Parker before he storms off and falls down a flight of stairs in front of everyone.

Charlotte reads some of Fred's columns and decides to hire him as a speechwriter, over the protests of her chief of staff, Maggie. Fred voices his skepticism of Charlotte's true commitment to important issues, but takes the job. At a world leaders' summit in Sweden, Charlotte is forced to revise a speech about an environmental campaign to appease industrialists. When Fred calls her out on abandoning her morals (threatening to quit then and there if she goes through with the changed speech), she changes her mind and gives the original speech, which is enthusiastically received.

As the two continue to spend time together under the pretext of Fred learning more about Charlotte for his writing, they grow closer. When they survive a revolution in Manila, they begin a relationship. When Maggie finds out, she warns Charlotte and Fred that the public will never accept them as a couple. When Chambers, under pressure from Wembley, orders Charlotte to remove her plans to preserve the trees, she lets off steam by getting high on ecstasy with Fred. A hostage crisis occurs and, still under the drug's influence, Charlotte has a frank talk with the captors and frees the hostage.

Even though the incident increases Charlotte's approval rating, Chambers is livid when she chooses to ignore his orders and call him out. He confronts her in his office alongside Parker, who has a vested interest in removing the trees as part of his plan. The two blackmail her with a hacked video from Fred's webcam. The hacked video depicts Fred discussing his and Charlotte's relationship and Fred further masturbating to a video of one of her speeches, the hacked video culminating in Fred ejaculating on his own face. Charlotte shows Fred the hacked video and informs him that she has agreed to the ultimatum, and that she wants to introduce him and their relationship publicly once his image is cleaned up. Disappointed and unwilling to change, he refuses and they break up.

Back in New York, Fred talks with Lance. Lance comes out to Fred as a Republican and a Christian. Fred's reaction is initially racist, not believing that African Americans can be Republican, and assuming that the only reason Lance wears a cross is as a black cultural symbol. Lance tells him that he has been too stubborn with his principles and refusal to consider other peoples' needs and opinions. Fred apologizes to Lance for this and decides to accede to Charlotte's ideas.

However, during her announcement to run for president in 2020, Charlotte changes her mind and opts for her original plan, also revealing the blackmail from Parker and Chambers, and describing the content of the video before its release. The video is released, and Fred is nicknamed, "cum guy" by the news media. Fred searches for Charlotte and finds her waiting at his apartment. They admit that they love each other, and meet the press outside where Charlotte introduces Fred as her boyfriend, with the public expressing support for them. By the time Charlotte is sworn in as the first female president in 2021, she has married Fred, who took her last name and becomes the country's "First Mister".

== Cast ==
- Seth Rogen as Fred Flarsky, an unemployed journalist
- Charlize Theron as Charlotte Field, the United States Secretary of State
- O'Shea Jackson Jr. as Lance, Fred's best friend
- Andy Serkis as Parker Wembley, an international media mogul
- June Diane Raphael as Maggie Millikin, one of Charlotte's two key staffers
- Ravi Patel as Tom, one of Charlotte's two key staffers
- Bob Odenkirk as US President Chambers, a former television actor
- Alexander Skarsgård as Canadian Prime Minister James Steward

In addition, Nathan Morris, Wanya Morris, Shawn Stockman and Lil Yachty have cameos as themselves.

== Production ==
=== Development ===
Screenwriter Dan Sterling, who around the early 2010s was working for several television shows, decided to take a break from that field and wanted to pursue a screenwriting career. The script, then titled Flarsky, described by producer Evan Goldberg as "a romantic comedy in the vein of Pretty Woman", had been floating around at Point Grey Pictures since its formation, at the time of production on The Green Hornet. Seth Rogen loved the script and wanted to make the film with Charlize Theron; according to him, it took about "7 years to get popular enough to work with her". Theron eventually agreed to do the film due to her eagerness to work with Rogen. Not only did Theron star and produce the movie, but she also helped out Sterling touch up on her character Charlotte. When director Jonathan Levine came on board as director, he wanted to make a film as a callback to romantic comedies of the 1980s, like Tootsie and When Harry Met Sally.... Since the initial draft of the script was written in the early 2010s and the film deals primarily with more recent political issues, the crew brought in The Post screenwriter Liz Hannah, whose first Hollywood job was at Theron's production company Denver and Delilah Productions, to help polish up and update the script. They also brought in other consultants to give more authenticity to the script.

=== Pre-production ===
In February 2017, the project was announced, with Rogen and Theron attached to star and Levine directing. Rogen was reportedly paid $15 million. In October 2017, O'Shea Jackson Jr. was cast. In November 2017, June Diane Raphael, Ravi Patel, Andy Serkis, Alexander Skarsgård, and Randall Park joined the cast as filming commenced in Montreal.

=== Filming ===
Scenes were filmed in Plaza de la Trinidad in Cartagena, Colombia in the end of January 2018. In January 2019, it was announced the film had been retitled Long Shot.

=== Music ===
Marco Beltrami and Miles Hankins composed the film's score, having previously worked with the director on The Night Before. Lionsgate Records has released the soundtrack. 20 songs are featured in the movie, not all are included on the official soundtrack album.

== Release ==
The film had its world premiere at South by Southwest on March 9, 2019. Originally slated to be released on February 8, 2019, following highly positive test screenings it was pushed back to June 7, 2019, in order to be positioned as a summer tentpole. It was then moved up to its eventual date of May 3, 2019.

== Reception ==
=== Box office ===
In the United States and Canada, Long Shot grossed $30.3 million, with $20.6 million in other territories, for a worldwide total of $53.9 million, against a budget of $40 million. It opened at No. 3, its first of four consecutive weeks in the Top 10 at the domestic box office.

=== Critical response ===
On the review aggregator website Rotten Tomatoes, 82% of 307 critics' reviews are positive, with an average rating of 7.1/10. The website's consensus reads: "A sharp and deceptively layered comedy that's further fueled by the odd couple chemistry of its leads, this Long Shot largely hits its marks." Metacritic, which uses a weighted average, assigned the film a score of 67 out of 100, based on 45 critics, indicating "generally favorable" reviews. Audiences polled by CinemaScore gave the film an average grade of "B" on an A+ to F scale, while those at PostTrak gave it 3.5 out of 5 stars and a 57% "definite recommend".

John DeFore of The Hollywood Reporter called it "Very funny whatever you think of its more old-fashioned notions, the picture will charm many viewers who can set implausibility aside for a while." Variety's Peter Debruge described the film as: "More creepy than romantic, more chauvinist than empowered — and in all fairness, funnier and more entertaining than any comedy in months — Long Shot serves up the far-fetched wish-fulfillment fantasy of how, for one lucky underdog, pursuing your first love could wind up making you first man."
