= Good Universe =

American film production company

- Type: Subsidiary
- Industry: Film
- Predecessor: Mandate Pictures
- Founded: 2012; 14 years ago
- Founders: Joe Drake; Nathan Kahane
- Headquarters: Beverly Hills, California, United States
- Parent: Lionsgate Films (2017–present)
- Divisions: Bad Hombre

Good Universe is an American independent film production company founded by Joe Drake and Nathan Kahane.

== History ==
In Spring 2012, Good Universe was launched as longtime partners Joe Drake and Nathan Kahane transitioned out of Lionsgate, where Drake served as the president of the Lionsgate Motion Picture Group and Kahane as the president of Mandate Pictures. The company launched at the 2012 Cannes Film Festival. The company used films from the development list of films it obtained from both Mandate Pictures, with a partnership from Lionsgate in order to help distribute the studio's movies, and had to expand the existing Ghost House Pictures label.

On March 5, 2014, it signed a pact with production company Point Grey Pictures, led by Seth Rogen and Evan Goldberg in order to set up a joint venture to produce comedy movies. On February 6, 2017, Fede Alvarez partnered with the company to set up Bad Hombre, which will produce films about the sci-fi and horror genres.

On September 2, 2015, the company is hiring Kelli Konop to serve as executive vice president of physical production for the company.

In 2017, Good Universe became a subsidiary of Lionsgate following Drake's return to the company as co-chair of the motion picture group. A year later, Nathan Kahane joined Lionsgate to serve as executive vice president of production at the company.

== Filmography ==
- Miller's Girl (2024) (released by Lionsgate)
- Texas Chainsaw Massacre (2022) (under Bad Hombre, released by Netflix)
- Don't Breathe 2 (2021) (under Bad Hombre, released by Screen Gems and Stage 6 Films through Sony Pictures Releasing)
- Desperados (2020) (released by Netflix)
- The Grudge (2020) (uncredited, released by Screen Gems and Stage 6 Films through Sony Pictures Releasing)
- Good Boys (2019) (released by Universal Pictures)
- Always Be My Maybe (2019) (released by Netflix)
- Long Shot (2019) (released by Lionsgate)
- Ibiza (2018) (released by Netflix)
- Extinction (2018) (released by Netflix)
- Blockers (2018) (released by Universal Pictures)
- The Disaster Artist (2017) (released by A24 in the United States and Canada and Warner Bros. Pictures under New Line Cinema internationally)
- The House (2017) (released by Warner Bros. Pictures)
- Don't Breathe (2016) (released by Screen Gems and Stage 6 Films through Sony Pictures Releasing)
- Neighbors 2: Sorority Rising (2016) (released by Universal Pictures)
- The Night Before (2015) (released by Columbia Pictures through Sony Pictures Releasing)
- Neighbors (2014) (released by Universal Pictures)
- Oldboy (2013) (released by FilmDistrict)
- Last Vegas (2013) (released by CBS Films)

== International sales ==
- Before I Fall (2017) (released by Open Road Films)
- Birth of the Dragon (2017) (released by OTL Releasing, WWE Studios, and BH Tilt)
- Mudbound (2017) (released by Netflix)
- My Big Fat Greek Wedding 2 (2016) (released by Universal Pictures)
- The Choice (2016) (released by Lionsgate)
- The Forest (2016) (released by Focus Features under Gramercy Pictures)
- The 33 (2015) (released by Alcon Entertainment through Warner Bros. Pictures)
- Norm of the North (2015) (released by Lionsgate)
- Beyond the Reach (2014) (released by Lionsgate and Roadside Attractions)
- Search Party (2014) (released by Focus World)
- Snowpiercer (2013) (released by Radius-TWC)
