= Hope Springs (2012 film) =

2012 film by David Frankel

- Theatrical release poster
- Directed by: David Frankel
- Written by: Vanessa Taylor
- Produced by: Guymon Casady; Todd Black
- Starring: Meryl Streep; Tommy Lee Jones; Steve Carell
- Cinematography: Florian Ballhaus
- Edited by: Steven Weisberg
- Music by: Theodore Shapiro
- Production companies: Columbia Pictures; Mandate Pictures; Metro-Goldwyn-Mayer Pictures; Film 360; Escape Artists
- Distributed by: Sony Pictures Releasing (United States and Canada); Lionsgate (International)
- Release date: August 10, 2012
- Running time: 100 minutes
- Country: United States
- Language: English
- Budget: $30 million
- Box office: $114.3 million

Hope Springs is a 2012 American romantic comedy drama film directed by David Frankel, written by Vanessa Taylor, and starring Meryl Streep, Tommy Lee Jones, and Steve Carell.

The film was released on August 10, 2012. It received generally positive reviews, and the cast was praised for their performances. It was nominated for a Golden Globe and won a People's Choice Award.

== Plot ==
Although a devoted couple, empty nesters Kay and Arnold Soames are in need of help to reignite the spark in their marriage. Married for thirty-one years, they have slept in separate bedrooms for various reasons since their youngest child went off to college.

One day Kay tells Arnold she has paid for them to undergo a week of intense marriage counseling with Dr. Bernie Feld in a coastal resort town in Maine. Arnold, a creature of plodding, unimaginative routine, denies their marriage is in trouble.

Dr. Feld challenges them to articulate their feelings and rediscover the spark that caused them to fall in love in the first place. In subsequent sessions the psychiatrist asks increasingly frank questions about their sex life and feelings. Both private and old-fashioned, Arnold is angry and defensive, unwilling to see the depth of his wife's disappointment. Upset, Kay goes alone to a bar, where she has several glasses of wine and confides in the bartender about her sexless marriage; the bartender reassures her that she is not alone. Arnold visits a nautical museum.

Back together, they spend the night in the same bed for the first time in years, and Kay awakes to find Arnold's arm around her. At this sign of progress, Dr. Feld urges new measures. They make halting attempts at intimacy on the bed of their budget motel and again in a movie theater, but this time with disastrous results.

In a one-on-one session, Dr. Feld explains to Arnold that couples seeking marriage counseling are doing so for a reason, and asks him frankly, "Is this the best you can do?" Arnold finally takes the initiative to arrange a romantic dinner and a night at a luxury inn, where they attempt to have sex in front of a fireplace, but the grand gesture ultimately fails. At their final session, Dr. Feld tells them they've made much progress and should take up couples therapy back home.

Back in Omaha, old habits resume. Kay offers to pet-sit for a fellow employee and packs a bag to stay there, as a first step in a permanent break with Arnold. That night, both are shown in bed trying to sleep. Arnold enters Kay's bedroom and they tenderly embrace. The sex that follows is warm, natural, and quietly passionate.

The next morning it's clear that the marriage has shifted into an improved direction. Later that year, as Kay said she fantasized, they renew their wedding vows on a beach with Dr. Feld and their grown children present, making promises to be more understanding and considerate of each other.

== Cast ==
- Meryl Streep as Kay Soames
- Tommy Lee Jones as Arnold Soames
- Steve Carell as Dr. Bernard "Bernie" Feld
- Elisabeth Shue as Karen
- Jean Smart as Eileen
- Brett Rice as Vince
- Mimi Rogers as Carol
- Ben Rappaport as Brad Soames
- Marin Ireland as Molly Soames
- Patch Darragh as Mark
- Becky Ann Baker as Cora
- Daniel Flaherty as Danny
- Damian Young as Mike
- Ann Harada as Ann
- Susan Misner as Dana Feld
- Lee Cunningham as Lee

== Production ==
The project was first announced in 2010 as Great Hope Springs, with Streep and Jeff Bridges in talks for the leads and Mike Nichols as director. Bridges dropped out, and James Gandolfini and Philip Seymour Hoffman were added to the project.

Nichols was then replaced by David Frankel without the involvement of Gandolfini and Hoffman. Steve Carell joined the cast in February 2011, with Tommy Lee Jones replacing Bridges in the opposite lead.

Filming took place in September and October 2011 in Connecticut.

== Reception ==
Reviews were mostly positive, with critics praising the cast, particularly Streep, Jones, and Carell. Review aggregator website Rotten Tomatoes gave the film an approval rating of 75% based on reviews from 171 critics, with an average score of 6.70/10. The website's consensus states: "Led by a pair of mesmerizing performances from Meryl Streep and Tommy Lee Jones, Hope Springs offers filmgoers some grown-up laughs -- and a thoughtful look at mature relationships." Metacritic, which assigns a weighted mean rating to reviews from mainstream critics, gives the film a score of 65 out of 100, based on reviews from 36 critics, indicating "generally favorable" reviews.

Rex Reed of The New York Observer praised the film:

I think everything about the movie is too subtle and real to appeal to the Batman demographic, but for mature audiences who have forgotten how to smile, it takes up where The Best Exotic Marigold Hotel left off.

Angie Errigo of Empire magazine felt the film worked on multiple levels:

Very funny, it's also penetrating on the ravages of time on love and marriage and sweetly touching, but with abundantly incongruous randy content to heartily amuse.

Roger Ebert of the Chicago Sun-Times praised the performance of Jones:

The reason to see it is for Jones. This man who can stride fearlessly through roles requiring strong, determined men, this actor who can seem in complete control, finds a character here who seems unlike any other he has played and plays it bravely.

=== Accolades ===
Year	Award	Category	Result	Recipient
2013
2013	70th Golden Globe Awards	Best Actress in a Motion Picture – Comedy or Musical	Nominated	Meryl Streep
2013	39th People's Choice Awards	Favorite Dramatic Movie Actress	Nominated	Meryl Streep
2013	39th People's Choice Awards	Favorite Movie Icon	Won	Meryl Streep

== Home media ==
Hope Springs was released on DVD and Blu-ray Disc on December 4, 2012.
