= Passengers (2008 film) =

2008 film directed by Rodrigo García

- Theatrical release poster
- Directed by: Rodrigo García
- Written by: Ronnie Christensen
- Produced by: Julie Lynn; Judd Payne; Matthew Rhodes; Keri Selig
- Starring: Anne Hathaway; Patrick Wilson; David Morse; Andre Braugher; Clea DuVall; Chelah Horsdal; Dianne Wiest
- Cinematography: Igor Jadue-Lillo
- Edited by: Thom Noble
- Music by: Edward Shearmur
- Production companies: TriStar Pictures; Mandate Pictures; Persistent Entertainment; Intuition Films
- Distributed by: Sony Pictures Releasing (North America); Mandate International (International)
- Release date: October 24, 2008
- Running time: 93 minutes
- Countries: United States; Canada
- Language: English
- Budget: $25 million
- Box office: $5.8 million

Passengers is a 2008 romantic mystery thriller film directed by Rodrigo García, written by Ronnie Christensen, and starring Anne Hathaway and Patrick Wilson. It was released in the United States by TriStar Pictures on October 24, 2008.

== Plot ==
Psychotherapist Claire Summers counsels five survivors of a recent plane crash: passengers Dean, Norman, Shannon, Eric, and flight attendant Janice. Eric, however, is unusually euphoric after the tragedy, and he asks that Claire meet with him individually rather than in group sessions with the others. She later talks with Mr. Arkin, an airline official, about the survivors' differing recollections of the crash; Dean is sure there was an explosion before the crash, but the others disagree. Arkin claims pilot error was responsible. Eric expresses his attraction to Claire, but she is suspicious when he seems to know personal information about her, such as her fraught relationship with her sister.

When Dean misses a session and a stranger seems to be stalking the survivors, Norman concludes the airline is targeting the surviving passengers to cover up the airline's history of negligent mechanical failures. While Norman originally remembered nothing odd happening before the crash, he tells Claire that he now remembers an engine exploding. Later, Eric displays strange behavior in response to a dog barking outside, and Claire is conflicted between her role as counselor and her growing personal feelings for him. She asks him to stop coming on to her, but Toni, her kindly neighbor, urges her to take a chance with him.

At the following session, Norman is absent, leaving only Janice and Shannon. Arkin warns Claire against feeding the airline cover-up theory to the remaining survivors, but she angrily tells him to stay away and later tells her supervisor, Perry, that she is worried about her missing patients. Claire then visits Eric, rides on his motorcycle, sails on his boat, swims with him, and finally has sex with him. She also leaves unanswered voice mail messages for her estranged sister, Emma, indicating that she wants to reconcile. She takes flowers to Emma's house, but no one is home. Arkin confronts her as she departs, telling her that he knows she is sleeping with one of her patients. Claire then encounters Norman's stalker, who turns out to be another crash survivor who remembers an explosion. She takes him to see Arkin at the airport and angrily blames the airline for the crash and a cover-up. As Arkin denies the accusations, the survivor suddenly disappears, leaving Claire shaken and bewildered.

Eric returns to the crash site and experiences frightening memories of an exploding engine. Meanwhile, Shannon is the only one at the next session; just before Claire arrives, Shannon has a vision of her dead parents outside. Eric also arrives, and as Claire takes him and Shannon to her apartment, he tells Claire that he recalls an engine blowing up. Claire counsels Shannon about her feelings for her parents, who were killed when she was a child. Eric sees the same dog outside Claire's apartment and recognizes it as a pet that died when he was young. Convinced that he was killed in the crash, he runs out of the apartment and stands in front of an onrushing train, which has no effect on him, then shouts to Claire that she should stay away from him.

Shannon disappears from Claire's apartment, but her neighbor says she left with a man and a woman. Claire goes to her supervisor, who is convinced she has latched onto a conspiracy theory, and she angrily accuses him of helping Arkin cover up the truth. At Emma's house, Arkin suddenly appears and again tells Claire that the pilot was responsible for the crash. Arkin departs but leaves his briefcase behind. Claire becomes hysterical after finding a ledger inside listing all the passengers who died in the crash. Claire's name is on the ledger, and Arkin is listed as the pilot.

The next morning, Claire finds Eric on his boat. He explains that he withheld telling her that she and the other passengers died in the crash because everyone had to discover it individually. Deceased people and even pets from their pasts (unrecognized by the recently deceased) helped them to understand and accept death. Toni and Perry were Claire’s deceased aunt and teacher sent for this purpose. She and Eric sail from the harbor to cross over into the afterlife. A flashback shows Claire and Eric in adjacent seats on the plane. During the flight, Claire and Eric develop an attraction. When the engine catches fire and the plane depressurizes, Eric assures her they will be all right.

Sometime later, Claire's landlord let Emma and her husband into Claire's apartment. Emma finds a note Claire was planning to send.

== Cast ==
- Anne Hathaway as Claire Summers
- Patrick Wilson as Eric Clark
- Clea DuVall as Shannon
- Andre Braugher as Perry Jackson
- Chelah Horsdal as Janice
- David Morse as Arkin
- Dianne Wiest as Toni
- William B. Davis as Eric's grandfather
- Ryan Robbins as Dean
- Don Thompson as Norman
- Brad Turner as Shannon's father
- Claire Smithies as Shannon's mother
- Stacy Grant as Emma, Claire's sister
- Angie Milliken as Melody

== Music ==
Passengers

Film score by Edward Shearmur
- Released: October 28, 2008
- Genres: Soundtracks; Film score
- Label: Varèse Sarabande

The film's score was composed by Edward Shearmur.

1. "The Wreckage"
2. "Group Therapy"
3. "House Call"
4. "What Do You Remember?"
5. "Norman"
6. "At the Museum"
7. "Giving Eric the Key"
8. "Eric at Midnight"
9. "Arkin"
10. "Rooftop"
11. "Motorcycle Fix"
12. "Norman's House"
13. "Eric Remembers"
14. "Porch"
15. "Epiphany"
16. "At Peace"
17. "End Titles"

== Release ==
=== Box office ===
Passengers was released in 125 theaters on October 24, 2008 in United States and Canada and earned $173,544 on the opening weekend. The film grossed a total of $5,787,152: $292,437 from domestic location and $5,494,715 from overseas locations.

=== Critical response ===
The film received generally negative critical reviews. On the review aggregator website Rotten Tomatoes, 19% of 31 critics' reviews are positive, with an average rating of 4.1/10. Metacritic, which uses a weighted average, assigned the film a score of 40 out of 100, based on 8 critics, indicating "mixed or average" reviews.

Some critics did appreciate the performances of the lead actors. However, the film's pacing and plot were often cited as areas in need of improvement.

Manohla Dargis of The New York Times was positive, praising the performances of Anne Hathaway and Patrick Wilson, but noting that the film's direction and script were uneven.
