= Horsemen (film) =

- Theatrical release poster
- Directed by: Jonas Åkerlund
- Written by: David Callaham
- Produced by: Michael Bay; Andrew Form; Brad Fuller
- Starring: Dennis Quaid; Zhang Ziyi; Lou Taylor Pucci; Clifton Collins, Jr.; Patrick Fugit; Peter Stormare
- Cinematography: Eric Broms
- Edited by: Jim May; Todd E. Miller
- Music by: Jan A.P. Kaczmarek
- Production companies: Mandate Pictures; Platinum Dunes; Radar Pictures
- Distributed by: Lionsgate
- Release date: March 6, 2009
- Running time: 91 minutes
- Country: United States
- Language: English
- Box office: $2.4 million

Horsemen is a 2009 American psychological thriller film directed by Jonas Åkerlund, written by David Callaham, produced by Michael Bay, and starring Dennis Quaid and Zhang Ziyi. It follows Aidan Breslin (Dennis Quaid), a bitter and emotionally distracted detective who has grown apart from his two sons after the death of his devoted wife. While investigating a series of murders, he discovers a terrifying link between himself and the suspects that seem to be based on the Biblical prophecies concerning the Four Horsemen of the Apocalypse: War, Famine, Pestilence and Death. The film was shot in Winnipeg and was released on March 6, 2009.

== Plot ==
Detective Aidan Breslin is a widower who has become emotionally distanced from his two sons, Alex and Sean. Due to his dental forensics expertise, Breslin is called to investigate a crime scene that includes human teeth and a painted message: "come and see". After matching the teeth to a missing man, Breslin investigates the murder of a woman, Mrs. Spitz, who was discovered hanging from a hook contraption in her bedroom; the same message appears on four walls. According to her autopsy report, she drowned in her own blood due to a precise stabbing. They also discover Mrs. Spitz had been pregnant, and the fetus was removed. Aidan speculates there were four attackers, who recorded the murder. After leaving the crime scene, Breslin comforts the Spitz's adopted daughter, Kristen.

The next murder shares the same M.O.; the similar hook contraption leads Breslin to a tattoo parlor whose owner constructed four devices. Another murder occurs, this time with no hooks and a message on three walls. While Breslin reviews the evidence at his home, Sean stumbles on one of the photographs. Sean's insights indirectly point Breslin to the Bible, where he discovers the killings are patterned after the Four Horsemen of the Apocalypse. Each room corresponds to a horseman; the "come and see" message is a quotation from the Book of Revelation. Kristen contacts Breslin unexpectedly, and, during their conversation, Kristen produces the missing fetus, confessing to the stunned Breslin. During her interrogation, Breslin discovers the darker side of Kristen's personality, one similar to the horseman War.

At Kristen's house, Breslin and his partner, Stingray, discover snuff videos and pictures of Mr. Spitz posing sexually with Kristen. Stingray and Breslin arrest Mr. Spitz, and his children are placed in protective custody. When Breslin confronts Kristen in jail, she claims to have been sexually abused for years and murdered Mrs. Spitz as punishment for her complicity and to hurt Mr. Spitz. Evidence discovered in the unrigged victim's stomach leads Breslin to a booby-trapped apartment. A suspect escapes, and magnesium ribbons destroy most of the evidence.

Meanwhile, a gay young man, Corey, has a confrontation with his brother, Taylor. After Taylor insults him, Corey hands Taylor a drugged drink. As Taylor drunkenly stumbles out to his car, a thief accosts Corey in the parking lot. Corey stabs the man, who later provides the police with Corey's description. The precision of the stab wound, and a reference to Hell leads Breslin to assume it was done by the horseman Death. Elsewhere, Taylor awakens hooked onto a rig with his eyes fixed open. Corey attempts to cut out his own heart with a bone saw, killing himself in front of Taylor.

Breslin, convinced that there may be another victim, questions Kristen, who confirms that she represents War, and the unrigged victim was Pestilence, who betrayed their trust. She refuses to identify their leader. Breslin realizes he was meant to be assigned to the case and becomes concerned that his family will be targeted next. Breslin asks Stingray to go on ahead and check his house. At the Breslin home, Stingray is attacked and knocked out. Breslin arrives later and enters Alex's room for the first time in three years. To his horror, he realizes that Alex is Conquest, the horsemen's leader. A clue points him to the Metropolitan Theater, where Breslin met his wife. Alex sedates him, and, when he comes to, Breslin is handcuffed to a seat as Alex dangles over the stage on the final hook rig. As Alex bleeds to death, he describes the horsemen's emotional detachment from their families. Breslin rips his handcuffs off the seating and fires his gun to detach the rigging from the ceiling. Alex awakens as his father holds him. At the Breslin home, Sean wakes up from a nightmare as Breslin comforts him. When he asks where Alex is, Breslin reassures him that Alex will be okay.

== Cast ==
- Dennis Quaid as Aidan Breslin, a widower detective trying to solve the "Horsemen" case
- Zhang Ziyi as Kristen Spitz
- Lou Taylor Pucci as Alex Breslin
- Clifton Collins Jr. as "Stingray" Rodriguez
- Patrick Fugit as Corey Kurth
- Peter Stormare as Mr. Spitz
- Daryl Dorge as Garrison Jacobs
- Eric Balfour as Taylor
- Chelcie Ross as Police Chief Krupa
- Liam James as Sean Breslin
- Deborah Odell as Ms. Bradshaw
- David Dastmalchian as Terrence
- Barry Shabaka Henley as Tuck
- Paul Dooley as Father Whiteleather

== Production ==
In October 2002, it was reported Radar Pictures had acquired the David Callaham penned script Horsemen as part of its joint venture with Platinum Dunes for a 2003 start date. In March 2004, it was reported Rogue Pictures had come aboard to take on Horsemen as part of its development slate. In October 2006, it was reported Jonas Åkerlund would direct the film with Dennis Quaid and Zhang Ziyi set to star with Mandate Pictures having come aboard to provide financing. In February 2007, Patrick Fugit, Lou Taylor Pucci, Clifton Collins Jr., Barry Shabaka Henley, Neal McDonough and Peter Stormare had joined the cast with an eight week shoot having begun in Winnipeg, Manitoba, Canada.

== Release ==
The film was given a limited release in the United States on March 6, 2009 before its home video release on July 14, 2009.

== Reception ==
Review aggregation website Rotten Tomatoes gives the film an approval rating of 17% based on six reviews; the average rating is 3.8/10. Jordan Mintzer of Variety called it a predictable film that uses four cinematic cliches: "overstylized torture, whiplash editing, compulsive script reversals and crude neon lighting".
