= Last Vegas =

2013 film by Jon Turteltaub

- Theatrical release poster
- Directed by: Jon Turteltaub
- Written by: Dan Fogelman
- Produced by: Laurence Mark; Nathan Kahane; Amy Baer; Matt Leonetti
- Starring: Michael Douglas; Robert De Niro; Morgan Freeman; Kevin Kline; Mary Steenburgen
- Cinematography: David Hennings
- Edited by: David Rennie
- Music by: Mark Mothersbaugh
- Production company: Good Universe
- Distributed by: CBS Films
- Release dates: October 30, 2013 (New York City); November 1, 2013 (United States)
- Running time: 105 minutes
- Country: United States
- Language: English
- Budget: $28 million
- Box office: $134.4 million

Last Vegas is a 2013 American comedy film directed by Jon Turteltaub, written by Dan Fogelman and starring Michael Douglas, Robert De Niro, Morgan Freeman, Kevin Kline and Mary Steenburgen. Three retirees travel to Las Vegas to have a bachelor party for their last remaining single friend. The film was released to theaters on November 1, 2013, by CBS Films.

== Plot ==
Four childhood friends from Brooklyn—Sam, Archie, Paddy and Billy—are now elderly. Sam and his wife Miriam live in Naples, Florida. Twice-divorced Vietnam veteran Archie lives in New Jersey. Paddy lives alone in Brooklyn, bitter since the death of his wife Sophie. Billy is a successful entrepreneur in Malibu living with his 31-year-old girlfriend Lisa. After proposing to Lisa, Billy finds an old bottle of scotch that the friends stole in their childhood days. He calls Sam and Archie, who propose a bachelor party for Billy in Las Vegas. Given permission by Miriam to have sex with someone else, Sam collects Archie, whose son is constantly worried about his father's health. Having convinced Paddy to join them, they meet up with Billy in Vegas.

Billy and Paddy argue about Billy's failure to attend Sophie's funeral. Visiting the wedding venue at the Aria Resort and Casino, the four are attracted to the lounge by the singing of Diana. Over a drink, they convince Diana to join their festivities.

While awaiting their rooms, Archie buys $15,000 of blackjack chips with his pension money. When Paddy and Sam return, they find him ahead by $102,000. They leave the gambling room in fear of being accused of card counting. Billy tours the wedding chapel with Diana and becomes smitten with her.

The four become judges of a swimsuit competition. The casino manager offers them his largest penthouse suite in the hope that Archie will stay and spend his winnings. Billy suggests that they open the old bottle of scotch to celebrate, but Paddy storms off. The other three enjoy a night of partying at the hotel's nightclub. A young maid of honor from a bachelorette party feels attracted to Sam.

The following day, while the others are recovering, Paddy visits Diana and tells her that he and Billy were both in love with Sophie when they were younger and that she had picked Paddy. Diana tells him to stop grieving and move on because Sophie would want it. Paddy joins Billy at their pool cabana and admits that he needs to move on, chastizing Billy for marrying a woman whom he does not truly love. Sam and Archie prepare a bachelor party for Billy in their suite, inviting numerous people, including a bachelorette party group, exotic dancers, a band of drag queens, and cast members of Zarkana.

Billy visits Diana. She admits that she is fond of him, and asks if he truly loves Lisa. As they walk along The Strip, Billy tells Diana that Paddy gave Sophie an ultimatum to choose either Billy or him, and that she secretly chose Billy first, but Billy told Sophie that she was meant to be with Paddy.

Paddy tells Billy that he invited Diana to the party because he likes her and wants to start anew after Sophie's passing, but he realizes that Billy likes her too. When Diana arrives, Billy pushes Paddy into the pool and takes Diana upstairs to tell her to give Paddy a chance. She says that she feels like she is being treated like Sophie, "gifted" by Billy to Paddy, which Paddy overhears. Devastated, Paddy leaves the party, throwing the old scotch bottle in the trash. Sam prepares to cheat on his wife with the young maid of honor but cannot bring himself to do it.

The next morning, Paddy confronts Billy at the pool. He says no one can tell Sophie who to love, and that they shared a beautiful life together. He tells Billy to call off the wedding. As Lisa and her bridesmaids arrive, Paddy pushes Billy into the pool and tells Lisa that Billy is calling off the wedding.

Billy admits his fear of getting old and being alone. He goes to the lounge where Diana is singing and reveals his feelings for her. The guys decide to finally open the old bottle of scotch for a toast, but to their surprise, all but Paddy find the taste repulsive.

A few months later, Billy and Diana call Archie and Paddy to announce that they are getting married. Sam is unable to answer the phone because he is being intimate with his wife.

== Cast ==
- Michael Douglas as Billy Gerson
- Robert De Niro as Patrick "Paddy" Connors
- Morgan Freeman as Archibald "Archie" Clayton
- Kevin Kline as Sam Harris
- Mary Steenburgen as Diana Boyle
- Jerry Ferrara as Dean
- Romany Malco as Lonnie
- Roger Bart as Maurice
- Joanna Gleason as Miriam Harris
- Michael Ealy as Ezra Clayton
- Bre Blair as Lisa
- Ashley Spillers as Elizabeth
- April Billingsley as Bachelorette's Maid of Honor
- Andrea Moore as Bachelorette
- Lisa Young as Blackjack Dealer
- 50 Cent as himself
- Redfoo as himself

== Production ==
Early in development, Jack Nicholson was attached to the project.

Principal photography started in November 2012 in Las Vegas. At the end of November, filming moved to the Atlanta, Georgia, area.

== Reception ==
=== Critical response ===
On Rotten Tomatoes, the film holds an approval rating of 44% based on 142 reviews, with an average rating of 5.1/10. The site's critics consensus reads: "The cast of Last Vegas keep things amiably watchable, but the film is mostly a mellower Hangover retread for the older set." On Metacritic, the film has a weighted average score of 48 out of 100, based on 34 critics, indicating "mixed or average" reviews. Audiences surveyed by CinemaScore gave the film an average grade of "A−" on a scale of A+ to F.

Scott Foundas of Variety wrote, "A smattering of funny gags and the nostalgia value of the cast—none of whom, curiously, have ever shared the screen before—keeps the whole thing more watchable than it has any right to be." Foundas calls the film a clone of The Hangover and praises Mary Steenburgen for her performance but says, "The rest of the movie rarely if ever rises to Steenburgen's level".

Ignatiy Vishnevetsky of The A.V. Club gave the film a grade D− and wrote, "The high point of Last Vegas is also arguably the low point of Robert De Niro's career".

=== Box office ===
Last Vegas grossed $16.3 million in its opening weekend in the US from 3,065 theaters, averaging $5,329 per theater and ranking #3 for the weekend. The film closed on February 20, 2014, with a worldwide final gross of $134.4 million, becoming CBS Films's highest-grossing film.

== Home media ==
Last Vegas was released on DVD and Blu-ray on January 28, 2014.

== Soundtrack ==
The soundtrack to Last Vegas was released on October 29, 2013.

No.	Title	Artist	Length
1.	"Last Vegas"	Mark Mothersbaugh	1:39
2.	"Paddy Packs a Punch"	Mark Mothersbaugh	0:22
3.	"Paddy Intro/Eulogy"	Mark Mothersbaugh	2:33
4.	"Telling the Boys"	Mark Mothersbaugh	1:12
5.	"Only You (And You Alone)"	Buck Ram	2:05
6.	"Happy Dance"	Mark Mothersbaugh	0:19
7.	"Archie's Great Escape"	Mark Mothersbaugh	1:58
8.	"Flight of the Flatbush"	Mark Mothersbaugh	2:03
9.	"Cup of Trouble"	performed by Mary Steenburgen	2:24
10.	"Archie Gambles"	Mark Mothersbaugh	1:18
11.	"Bikini Babes"	Mark Mothersbaugh	0:35
12.	"The Penthouse"	Mark Mothersbaugh	1:03
13.	"Curtain Confusion"	Mark Mothersbaugh	0:45
14.	"You're Nobody 'til Somebody Loves You"	James Cavanaugh / Russ Morgan / Larry Stock	2:16
15.	"Dean Meets Knuckles"	Mark Mothersbaugh	1:13
16.	"Sophie's Choice"	Mark Mothersbaugh	2:26
17.	"Sam's Realization"	Mark Mothersbaugh	1:29
18.	"Only You [Slow Version]"	Performed by Mary Steenburgen	1:58
19.	"Paddy Crushed"	Mark Mothersbaugh	2:39
20.	"Paddy's Ultimatum"	Mark Mothersbaugh	1:49
21.	"Billy Breaks It Packing"	Mark Mothersbaugh	2:29
22.	"Bad Scotch"	Mark Mothersbaugh	1:13
23.	"Four Fellas"	Mark Mothersbaugh	1:28
24.	"Billy's Getting Married"	Mark Mothersbaugh	1:27
25.	"I Only Have Eyes For You"	Al Dubin / Harry Warren	2:40
Total length:			41:33

== See also ==
- List of films set in Las Vegas
