= Point Grey Pictures =

American independent film production company

Point Grey
- Type: Private
- Industry: Film; Television
- Founded: February 12, 2011; 15 years ago
- Founder: Seth Rogen; Evan Goldberg
- Headquarters: Vancouver, British Columbia, Canada; Los Angeles, California, U.S.
- Key people: Seth Rogen (CEO); Evan Goldberg (CEO); James Weaver (president)
- Products: Feature films Television series
- Website: pointgreypictures.com

Point Grey Pictures (PGP) is a Canadian-American film and television production company, founded in 2011 by Seth Rogen and Evan Goldberg. The company is named after Point Grey Secondary School in Vancouver, where they met.

== History ==
Founded by Seth Rogen and Evan Goldberg on February 12, 2011, the company was named after the school of the same name where they met as students. On August 12, 2016, it produced its first animated feature, Sausage Party. On February 6, 2014, the company released its first television project, Preacher, on AMC. On March 5, 2014, it entered a pact with the Good Universe movie studio to develop comedy films. In 2018, the company began talks with the Lionsgate film studio which were finalized by April 2019. In 2024, Point Grey signed a first-look deal with Universal Pictures.

== Filmography ==
=== Films ===
==== Released ====
Release date	Title	Co-production with	Distributed by
September 30, 2011	50/50	Mandate Pictures	Summit Entertainment (United States); Lionsgate (International)
June 12, 2013	This Is the End	Columbia Pictures; Mandate Pictures	Sony Pictures Releasing
May 9, 2014	Neighbors	Good Universe	Universal Pictures
December 25, 2014	The Interview	Columbia Pictures; LStar Capital	Sony Pictures Releasing
November 20, 2015	The Night Before	Columbia Pictures; Good Universe	Sony Pictures Releasing
May 20, 2016	Neighbors 2: Sorority Rising	Good Universe; Perfect World Pictures	Universal Pictures
August 12, 2016	Sausage Party	Columbia Pictures; Annapurna Pictures; Nitrogen Studios	Sony Pictures Releasing
December 1, 2017	The Disaster Artist	New Line Cinema; Good Universe; Rabbit Bandini Productions; Ramona Films	A24 (North America); Warner Bros. Pictures (International)
March 23, 2018	Game Over, Man!	Scott Rudin Productions; Mail Order Company	Netflix
April 6, 2018	Blockers	DMG Entertainment; Good Universe; Hurwitz & Schlossberg Productions	Universal Pictures
May 3, 2019	Long Shot	Summit Entertainment; Good Universe; Denver and Delilah Productions	Lionsgate
August 16, 2019	Good Boys	Good Universe; Quantity Entertainment	Universal Pictures
August 6, 2020	An American Pickle	Sony Pictures; Warner Max	HBO Max (United States); Warner Bros. Pictures (International)
September 23, 2020	Console Wars	Legendary Television; CBS Television Studios	Paramount+
July 7, 2023	Joy Ride	Red Mysterious Hippo	Lionsgate
July 21, 2023	Cobweb	Vertigo Entertainment	Lionsgate
August 2, 2023	Teenage Mutant Ninja Turtles: Mutant Mayhem	Nickelodeon Movies	Paramount Pictures
January 26, 2024	Miller's Girl	Good Universe	Lionsgate
August 14, 2026	The Wrong Girls	Nevermind Pictures; Savage Road Productions; Curious Gremlin	Neon
September 18, 2026	Tiny Fugitives	Tango Entertainment; Public House Pictures	Inaugural Entertainment

==== Upcoming ====
Release date	Title	Co-production with	Distributed by
January 15, 2027	Tangles	Lylas Pictures; Monarch Media; Giant Ant	Independent Film Company; Sapan Studio
August 13, 2027	Untitled Teenage Mutant Ninja Turtles: Mutant Mayhem sequel	Paramount Animation; Nickelodeon Movies	Paramount Pictures
Undated
2027	4 Kids Walk Into a Bank	Miramax; Wild Atlantic; Aperture Media Partners; Round Mound Media; Kinofilms; Picturestart; Black Mask Studios; Uncle Pete Productions	Orion Pictures (via Amazon MGM Studios)
In development
TBA	79ers	Gary Sanchez Productions	Lionsgate
TBA	Black and White	Stoller Global Solutions; HartBeat Productions	Paramount Pictures
TBA	Bubble	Columbia Pictures; Sony Pictures Animation; Matt Tolmach Productions	Sony Pictures Releasing
TBA	Chippendales	20th Century Studios; Regency Enterprises; Bold Films; Permut Productions	20th Century Studios
TBA	Untitled Home Alone sequel	—N/a	20th Century Studios
TBA	Untitled Figment film	Walt Disney Pictures; 3 Arts Entertainment	Walt Disney Studios Motion Pictures
TBA	Invincible	Skybound Entertainment	Universal Pictures
TBA	Memetic	Boom! Studios	Lionsgate
TBA	Par for the Course	Fifth Chance	Universal Pictures
TBA	The Something	Good Universe	Universal Pictures
TBA	Untitled animated John Wick film	Thunder Road Films; 87Eleven Entertainment	Lionsgate
TBA	Untitled Stephen Merchant film	—N/a	Amazon MGM Studios
TBA	Video Nasty	Stampede Ventures	Lionsgate
TBA	Where's Waldo?	Metro-Goldwyn-Mayer; DreamWorks Classics	Metro-Goldwyn-Mayer (United States); Warner Bros. Pictures (International)

=== Short films ===
==== Released ====
Release date	Title	Co-production with	Distributed by
December 19, 2025	Teenage Mutant Ninja Turtles: Chrome Alone 2 – Lost in New Jersey	Paramount Animation; Nickelodeon Movies	Paramount Pictures

== Television ==
=== TV series ===
==== Released ====
Year(s)	Title	Production companies	Network	Series status
2016–19	Preacher	Sony Pictures Television; AMC Studios; Woodbridge Productions; KFL Nightsky Productions; Short Drive Entertainment; Original Film; Kickstart Productions	AMC	Concluded after 4 seasons
2017–20	Future Man	Sony Pictures Television; Matt Tolmach Productions; Turkeyfoot Productions	Hulu	Concluded after 3 seasons
2019–21	Black Monday	Sony Pictures Television; Showtime Networks; Jordan Productions; Shark vs. Bear	Showtime	Canceled after 3 seasons
2019–26	The Boys	Sony Pictures Television; Amazon MGM Studios; Kripke Enterprises; Original Film; Kickstart Entertainment; KFL Nightsky Productions	Amazon Prime Video	Concluded after 5 seasons
2021–present	Invincible	Skybound North; Wind Sun Sky Entertainment; Skybound Animation; Amazon MGM Studios	Amazon Prime Video	Renewed for seasons 5 & 6
2021	Santa Inc.	Rushfield Productions oh us. Stoopid Buddy Stoodios; Lionsgate Television	HBO Max	Miniseries
2022	Pam & Tommy	Annapurna Television; Limelight; Ramona Films	Hulu	Miniseries
2022	The Boys Presents: Diabolical	Sony Pictures Television; Amazon Studios; Titmouse, Inc. Kripke Enterprises; Original Film	Amazon Prime Video	Miniseries
2023	Paul T. Goldman	Annapurna Television; Caviar; Swindle; Lionsgate Television	Peacock	Documentary miniseries
2023–25	Gen V	Sony Pictures Television; Amazon MGM Studios; Kripke Enterprises; Original Film; Fazekas & Butters; Kickstart Entertainment; KFL Nightsky Productions	Amazon Prime Video	Canceled after 2 seasons
2024	The Great Canadian Pottery Throw Down	CBC Television; Frantic Films	CBC Television	Reality competition Concluded after 1 season
2024–25	Sausage Party: Foodtopia	Sony Pictures Television; Amazon MGM Studios; Annapurna Television	Amazon Prime Video	
2024–25	Tales of the Teenage Mutant Ninja Turtles	Nickelodeon Animation Studio; Titmouse, Inc.	Paramount+	Canceled after 2 seasons
2025–present	The Studio	Lionsgate Television; Contractually Obligated Two Second Half Screen Vanity Card Productions; Coytesville Productions	Apple TV+	Renewed for season 2

==== Upcoming ====
Year(s)	Title	Production companies	Network	Series status
TBA	Vought Rising	Kripke Enterprises; Original Film; Amazon MGM Studios; Sony Pictures Television	Amazon Prime Video	Filming
TBA	Darkwing Duck	Disney Television Animation	Disney+	In production
TBA	The Boys: Mexico	Kripke Enterprises; Original Film; Amazon MGM Studios; Sony Pictures Television	Amazon Prime Video	In development
TBA	Console Wars	Flying Penguin Pictures; Legendary Television; Scott Rudin Productions	Paramount+	In development
TBA	Fear Agent	Sony Pictures Television; Amazon MGM Studios; Matt Tolmach Productions	Amazon Prime Video	In development
TBA	TaleSpin	Disney Television Animation	Disney+	In development
TBA	The Littlest Hobo	Crave; Bell Media; Lionsgate Canada	Crave	In development

=== TV specials ===
==== Released ====
Year(s)	Title	Production companies	Network
2026	The Muppet Show	The Muppet Studio; 20th Television; Disney Branded Television	Disney+ ABC

== Critical reception ==
Film	Metacritic	Rotten Tomatoes	References
50/50	72	94%	
This Is the End	67	83%	
Neighbors	68	73%	
The Interview	52	51%	
The Night Before	58	65%	
Neighbors 2: Sorority Rising	58	62%	
Sausage Party	66	82%	
The Disaster Artist	82	90%	
Game Over, Man!	32	20%	
Blockers	69	84%	
Long Shot	67	81%	
Good Boys	60	79%	
An American Pickle	58	73%	
Console Wars	—N/a	85%	
Joy Ride	74	90%	
Cobweb	50	59%	
Teenage Mutant Ninja Turtles: Mutant Mayhem	74	95%	
Miller's Girl	41	29%	
The Wrong Girls	59	61%	
Average score	61.5	71.43%	

== Commercial performance ==
Film	Budget	Domestic Gross	Worldwide Gross	Reference
50/50	$8,000,000	$35,014,192	$39,187,783	
This Is the End	$32,000,000	$101,470,202	$126,041,322	
Neighbors	$18,000,000	$150,157,400	$268,157,400	
The Interview	$44,000,000	$6,105,175	$11,305,175	
The Night Before	$25,000,000	$43,047,372	$52,395,996	
Neighbors 2: Sorority Rising	$35,000,000	$55,340,730	$107,181,009	
Sausage Party	$19,000,000	$97,670,358	$140,753,274	
The Disaster Artist	$10,000,000	$21,120,616	$29,820,616	
Game Over, Man!	$27,100,000	—N/a	—N/a	
Blockers	$21,000,000	$59,630,490	$91,230,490	
Long Shot	$40,000,000	$30,316,271	$53,859,936	
Good Boys	$20,000,000	$83,140,306	$110,940,306	
An American Pickle	$20,000,000	—N/a	$499,649	
Joy Ride	$32,000,000	$12,897,789	$15,787,674	
Cobweb	—N/a	—N/a	$8,052,602	
Teenage Mutant Ninja Turtles: Mutant Mayhem	$70,000,000	$118,613,586	$180,513,586	
Miller's Girl	$4,000,000	$321,000	$1,398,572	
The Wrong Girls	—N/a	$880,964	$4,091	
Total	$365,100,000	$621,518,768	$951,278,133	

== See also ==
- Apatow Productions, founded by Judd Apatow
- Big Talk Productions, founded by Nira Park
- Annapurna Pictures, founded by Megan Ellison
