= Blockers (film) =

2018 American sex comedy film by Kay Cannon

- Theatrical release poster
- Directed by: Kay Cannon
- Written by: Brian Kehoe; Jim Kehoe
- Produced by: Evan Goldberg; Seth Rogen; James Weaver; Jon Hurwitz; Hayden Schlossberg; Chris Fenton
- Starring: Leslie Mann; Ike Barinholtz; John Cena
- Cinematography: Russ Alsobrook
- Edited by: Stacey Schroeder
- Music by: Mateo Messina
- Production companies: Good Universe; Point Grey Pictures; Hurwitz & Schlossberg Productions; DMG Entertainment
- Distributed by: Universal Pictures
- Release dates: March 10, 2018 (SXSW); April 6, 2018 (United States)
- Running time: 102 minutes
- Country: United States
- Language: English
- Budget: $21 million
- Box office: $94 million

Blockers is a 2018 American sex comedy film directed by Kay Cannon in her directorial debut, and written by Brian and Jim Kehoe, and starring John Cena, Leslie Mann, and Ike Barinholtz with supporting roles by Kathryn Newton, Geraldine Viswanathan, Gideon Adlon, Graham Phillips, Miles Robbins, Jimmy Bellinger, Colton Dunn, Sarayu Blue, Gary Cole, Gina Gershon, June Diane Raphael, and Hannibal Buress. It tells the story of a trio of parents who try to stop their respective daughters from losing their virginity on prom night. The title of the film is a reference to the act of "cockblocking", with marketing materials displaying a rooster above the title.

The film premiered at South by Southwest on March 10, 2018, and was theatrically released in the United States on April 6, 2018, by Universal Pictures. It grossed $94 million worldwide and received generally positive reviews from critics, with praise for its "humor and performances", as well as for "intelligence and empathy" not often found in the genre.

== Plot ==
Single mother Lisa takes her young daughter, Julie, to her first day of kindergarten. She watches as Julie is befriended by two other girls, Kayla and Sam. Kayla's father Mitchell and Sam's father Hunter introduce themselves and the three become close friends after seeing the bond between their children.

Twelve years later, Julie shares with Kayla and Sam that she plans to lose her virginity to her boyfriend Austin on their upcoming prom night. Kayla pledges to do so as well, though on a casual basis with her lab partner, Connor. Sam, a closeted lesbian who is unsure about her feelings, also joins the pact and arranges to attend the prom with the harmless Chad.

Lisa throws a pre-party for the parents and kids. The girls and their dates then head to the prom, texting each other about their sex pact. The three parents hear Julie's laptop and intercept the messages. Hunter deciphers their emoji codes and uncovers their plan. Lisa and Mitchell rush to stop their daughters; Hunter tries to dissuade them from interfering and shares his intuition that Sam is gay, but upon seeing her force herself to kiss Chad, he becomes determined to stop her from doing something she does not want to do.

Having been told that the after-party would be at Austin's house, the parents go there but find only Austin's parents Ron and Cathy engaging in sex games. Ron reveals that the after-party is at a lake house but refuses to give the address. The trio realizes that Mitchell's wife Marcie may have it and retrieve the address against her wishes, as she supports Kayla's right to make her own decisions. However, the parents are unable to catch their daughters when the partygoers disperse to avoid the police.

As the group struggles to find their daughters, it becomes clear that each parent has their own motivation: Mitchell is in denial over his daughter growing up, Hunter feels guilty for neglecting Sam during his bitter divorce from her cheating mother, and Lisa is struggling to let go of her only child who secretly plans to leave for UCLA against her wishes; Lisa is confronted with this when Julie angrily states that she is going to UCLA to get away from Lisa's clinginess.

Knowing that Austin and Ron have been texting, the parents return to Ron's house to steal his phone. Encountering the couple playing a blindfolded sex game, Hunter and Mitchell are forced to play along as Lisa steals the phone, which reveals that the girls are at a hotel. There, a drunk Sam goes to bed with Chad but decides she does not want to have sex (he still prematurely ejaculates anyway). Kayla and Connor go to bed, but she also changes her mind and they limit their intimacy to Connor performing cunnilingus on Kayla.

Mitch finds Kayla with Connor and throws him against the wall, infuriating Kayla. Mitch confesses his struggles with her becoming a woman, his good intentions ultimately making amends with Kayla. Hunter finds Sam and they also share a tender moment, where he reveals that a good night was the best he could give her in return for his neglect. Sam comes out to her father, who is deeply moved at being the first person she told. Lisa sneaks into Julie and Austin's room and, realizing how much they clearly love each other, leaves unnoticed. On her father's advice, Sam comes out to Julie and Kayla, who embrace her and affirm their lifelong friendships. They leave Sam with her crush Angelica who shares a romantic kiss with her. Mitch, Lisa and Hunter acknowledge their own friendships have been strengthened and drink to their daughters' futures.

Three months later, the parents celebrate the departure of Sam, Kayla, Julie and Austin as they depart on a road trip to drop off Austin and Julie at UCLA. As they leave, Lisa starts receiving the girls' group text, filled with plans to use drugs and have unprotected sex. The parents panic until the girls text that it was a prank, and send a final "I love you" to them.

== Cast ==
- Leslie Mann as Lisa Decker, Julie's single mother.
- Ike Barinholtz as Hunter Lockwood, Sam's absentee divorced father.
- John Cena as Mitchell Mannes, Kayla's headstrong father.
- Hannibal Buress as Frank, Brenda's husband and Sam's stepfather.
- June Diane Raphael as Brenda Lockwood, Sam's mother and Hunter's ex-wife.
- Kathryn Newton as Julie Decker, Lisa's daughter.
  - Anniston Almond as 6-year-old Julie
  - Audrey Casson as 12-year-old Julie
- Gary Cole as Ron, Cathy's husband and Austin's father.
- Gina Gershon as Cathy, Ron's wife and Austin's mother.
- Colton Dunn as Rudy, a likable but overeager limo driver.
- Gideon Adlon as Sam Lockwood, Hunter's daughter.
  - Hannah Goergen as 6-year-old Sam
  - Aubrey Michele Katz as 12-year-old Sam
- Geraldine Viswanathan as Kayla Mannes, Mitchell and Marcie's daughter.
  - Noor Anna Maher as 6-year-old Kayla
  - Madeline Paris Erwin as 12-year-old Kayla
- Graham Phillips as Austin, Julie's boyfriend.
- Jimmy Bellinger as Chad, Sam's fedora-wearing prom date.
- Miles Robbins as Connor Aldrich, Kayla's prom date.
- Sarayu Blue as Marcie Mannes, Mitchell's wife and Kayla's mother.
- Ramona Young as Angelica, Sam's crush.
- Andrew Lopez as Jake Donahue
- Jake Picking as Kyler
- T.C. Carter as Jayden

== Production ==
The film was produced under the working title The Pact, referring to the girls' agreement to lose their virginity. Principal photography on the film began on May 2, 2017, in Atlanta, Georgia. During filming, Ike Barinholtz suffered a neck injury while performing a falling stunt.

== Release ==
Blockers was released by Universal Pictures on April 6, 2018.

=== Home media ===
The film was released on DVD and Blu-ray on July 3, 2018.

== Reception ==
=== Box office ===
Blockers grossed $60.3 million in the United States and Canada, and $33.7 million in other territories, for a worldwide total of $94 million, against a production budget of $21 million.

In the United States and Canada, Blockers was released alongside A Quiet Place, Chappaquiddick and The Miracle Season, and was projected to gross $16–20 million from 3,379 theaters in its opening weekend. The film made $7.8 million on its first day (including $1.5 million from Thursday night previews). It went on to debut to $20.6 million, finishing third, behind A Quiet Place ($50 million) and Ready Player One ($25.1 million). In its second weekend the film dropped 47.6% to $10.8 million, finishing fourth.

=== Critical response ===
On review aggregation website Rotten Tomatoes, the film holds an approval rating of 84% based on 229 reviews, with an average rating of 6.8/10. The website's critical consensus reads, "Blockers puts a gender-swapped spin on the teen sex comedy – one elevated by strong performances, a smartly funny script, and a surprisingly enlightened perspective." On Metacritic, the film has a weighted average score of 69 out of 100, based on 46 critics, indicating "generally favorable" reviews. Audiences polled by CinemaScore gave the film an average grade of "B" on an A+ to F scale, while PostTrak reported filmgoers gave it a 76% overall positive score.

Brian Lowry of CNN.com found that "the movie gets by on sheer energy" and praised director Kay Cannon for creating "some truly blue sequences and sight gags that yield explosive laughs [and] largely compensate for the arid patches, as do the warm/fuzzy exchanges, which smartly play off the idea of raising your children and then trusting them enough to let go." Describing Blockers as "absurd and funny", Amy Nicholson of Uproxx favorably compared screenwriters Brian and Jim Kehoe to American Pie directors Chris and Paul Weitz as "brothers trying to do right by the sexual politics of the time." Joshua Rothkopf of Time Out gave the film four out of five stars, calling it "a wonderfully crude film... in which the overall vibe is sweet" and a "hilarious, parents'-eye view of teenage sexuality." Adam Graham of The Detroit News called the film "highly dubious and not very funny," and stated that the film "awkwardly tries to balance gross-out gags with tender, warm-and-fuzzy moments. It's a tough trick to pull off, and Blockers gets stuffed at every turn." David Sims of The Atlantic stated that the film "works because of the time it invests in its teenaged characters. Each is a delight, particularly the supremely chilled-out Kayla (who decides to lose her virginity largely on a whim) and the more introverted Sam (who knows she's gay but hasn't quite figured out how to tell her friends and family)." Ann Hornaday from The Washington Post wrote: "The underlying values of "Blockers" are refreshingly healthy and affirming, proclaimed not only by Kayla's pointedly levelheaded mom (Sarayu Blue)—in a fiery speech about the double standards and the dubious politics of policing female sexuality—but by the girls themselves."

Richard Roeper of the Chicago Sun-Times gave the film two out of four stars, giving credit to the cast but saying they were not given much to do: "Despite the best efforts of reliable comedic veterans Leslie Mann and Ike Barinholtz, not to mention a game and always likable John Cena...Blockers becomes less interesting and less funny as the onscreen hijinks grow more outlandish and stupid and demeaning and crotch-oriented." Brian Tallerico of RogerEbert.com gave the film two-and-a-half stars, saying that it is "the kind of comedy one could stumble upon late at night on HBO and thoroughly enjoy, but it strains under the weight of its tonal inconsistencies in a movie theater."

=== Accolades ===
In 2019, the film was nominated for a GLAAD Media Award for Outstanding Film – Wide Release. Blockers was among 20 of 2018's 100 highest-grossing films awarded The ReFrame Stamp for recognition in "standout, gender-balanced" films, and also one out of four Stamp recipients with a female director.

== Music ==
The single "Love Myself" by Hailee Steinfeld appears twice in the film. In her review of Blockers, Insider writer Kim Renfro wrote, "The anthem carried throughout the movie, Hailee Steinfeld's 'Love Myself', drives the message home: 'I love me, gonna love myself, no I don't need anybody else.'"
