= The Night Before (2015 film) =

- Theatrical release poster
- Directed by: Jonathan Levine
- Screenplay by: Jonathan Levine; Kyle Hunter; Ariel Shaffir; Evan Goldberg
- Story by: Jonathan Levine
- Produced by: Evan Goldberg; Seth Rogen; James Weaver
- Starring: Joseph Gordon-Levitt; Seth Rogen; Anthony Mackie; Lizzy Caplan; Jillian Bell; Mindy Kaling; Michael Shannon
- Cinematography: Brandon Trost
- Edited by: Zene Baker
- Music by: Marco Beltrami; Miles Hankins
- Production companies: Columbia Pictures; Good Universe; Point Grey Pictures; LStar Capital
- Distributed by: Sony Pictures Releasing
- Release dates: November 16, 2015 (New York City); November 20, 2015 (United States)
- Running time: 101 minutes
- Country: United States
- Language: English
- Budget: $25–33 million
- Box office: $52.4 million

The Night Before is a 2015 American Christmas comedy stoner film directed by Jonathan Levine and written by Levine, Evan Goldberg, Kyle Hunter, and Ariel Shaffir. The film stars Joseph Gordon-Levitt, Seth Rogen, and Anthony Mackie as three childhood friends who annually reunite on Christmas Eve in search of an exclusive party in New York City. Lizzy Caplan, Jillian Bell, Mindy Kaling, and Michael Shannon also star.

Principal photography began on August 11, 2014, in New York City. Good Universe and Point Grey Pictures produced the film, which Columbia Pictures released in North America on November 20, 2015. The film received mixed reviews from critics and grossed $52 million worldwide.

== Plot ==
In December 2001, Ethan loses his parents in a car accident. His best friends Isaac and Chris resolve to spend every Christmas Eve with him so that he will not be alone.

The trio continue their holiday tradition every year until 2015, when they finally decide to end it, as Chris has become a famous football player while Isaac is married with a baby on the way. Both worry that Ethan, a struggling musician working dead-end jobs, is not ready for the tradition to end.

At work, Ethan finds and steals tickets to the exclusive Nutcracker Ball party within New York City. Before embarking on their last Christmas Eve together, Isaac's pregnant wife Betsy gives him recreational drugs, including magic mushrooms and cocaine.

To please his teammates, Chris purchases marijuana from their former high school dealer Mr. Green. At the karaoke bar, the trio runs into Diana, who broke up with Ethan three months ago due to his failure to commit and refusal to meet her parents, and her friend Sarah, both of whom are also attending the Nutcracker Ball. Isaac, affected by the drugs, records a video message confessing that he is terrified of having a child. Chris hooks up with a supposed fan who steals his marijuana.

The friends contact Mr. Green for more marijuana. Isaac realizes he accidentally switched phones with Sarah when he begins to receive sexts. The thief steals Chris' marijuana again, and the friends split up, as Chris wants his marijuana back and Isaac wants his phone, leaving an upset Ethan behind. Chris fails to recover the marijuana; Isaac, hallucinating from drugs, runs into Betsy and her family at church and vomits on the church floor during Midnight Mass. Ethan is beaten by two drunk pub crawling men dressed as Santa Claus after a confrontation.

Meeting back at the subway station, the tension between the friends explodes as Ethan reveals that they know Chris' sudden success is due to steroids, and Chris reveals that he and Isaac think Ethan is lost and not doing anything with his life. Nevertheless, the friends go to the Nutcracker Ball. Chris learns that his teammates did not need the marijuana he struggled to obtain, and mock him. Ethan meets Miley Cyrus, under whose encouragement he spontaneously proposes to Diana in front of the entire party. While she accepts publicly, Diana angrily declines in private, saying that he only proposed out of fear of being alone.

Ashamed and hurt, Ethan goes to the roof where he finds Mr. Green, who reveals that he is the creator of the Nutcracker Ball. Ethan believes his friends no longer need him but Mr. Green makes him experience the memory of his friends creating their yearly ritual that first Christmas after Ethan lost his parents. Ethan then finds Chris and Isaac calling for him after being thrown out due to an altercation with Chris' teammates.

As morning dawns, the friends reconcile. Mr. Green is revealed to be an angel, helping the friends in order to earn his wings. At the hospital after a false labor alarm, Isaac shows his wife the video; she finds it funny and admits she is also scared about becoming a parent.

The trio spend Christmas at Isaac's. Chris admits to his steroid use to his mother. Ethan goes to Diana's, where he apologizes for his commitment anxiety. Diana accepts his request to finally meet her parents.

One year later, the trio and their loved ones spend Christmas together. Isaac's baby cannot sleep, so the friends serenade her.

== Cast ==
- Seth Rogen as Isaac Greenberg
- Joseph Gordon-Levitt as Ethan Miller
- Anthony Mackie as Chris Roberts
- Lizzy Caplan as Diana, Ethan's ex-girlfriend
- Mindy Kaling as Sarah
- Jillian Bell as Betsy Greenberg, Isaac's wife
- Michael Shannon as Mr. Green
- Lorraine Toussaint as Mrs. Roberts, Chris's mother
- Jason Mantzoukas as Bad Santa #1
- Jason Jones as Bad Santa #2
- Ilana Glazer as Rebecca Grinch
- Nathan Fielder as Joshua
- Tracy Morgan as the Narrator/Santa Claus
- Randall Park as Ethan's boss
- Heléne Yorke as Cindy
- Aaron Hill as Tommy Owens
- Baron Davis as himself
- James Franco as himself
- Miley Cyrus as herself

== Production ==
=== Development ===
On February 10, 2014, it was announced that Seth Rogen and Joseph Gordon-Levitt would reunite in the film, following 50/50, in which they co-starred. On May 13, Anthony Mackie joined the cast. Jonathan Levine, director of 50/50, directed The Night Before from his own script. Good Universe and Point Grey Pictures produced the film, which Sony's Columbia Pictures distributed.

=== Casting ===
On August 7, Jillian Bell was cast to play Betsy, the wife of Rogen's character. On August 8, Lizzy Caplan joined the cast to play Diana, a love interest of Gordon-Levitt's character.

=== Filming ===
Principal photography on the film began on August 11, 2014, in New York City. On August 14, filming took place around 112th street and Broadway in New York City. On August 22, Rogen was spotted filming scenes outside a church in Manhattan. On January 5, 2015, filming took place in and around Rockefeller Center, where the crews were taking some shots of the Rockefeller Center Christmas Tree.

== Release ==
The film was originally scheduled to be released on December 11, 2015, but Sony moved the release date to November 25, 2015, and later to November 20, 2015.

=== Box office ===
The Night Before grossed $43 million in North America and $9.3 million in other territories for a worldwide total of $52.4 million, against a budget of $25 million.

In the United States, The Night Before opened alongside The Hunger Games: Mockingjay – Part 2 and Secret in Their Eyes on November 20, 2015. The film made $550,000 from its Thursday preview screenings and $3.6 million on its first day. In its opening weekend, the film grossed $9.9 million, and finished fourth at the box office behind Mockingjay – Part 2 ($102.7 million), Spectre ($15 million) and The Peanuts Movie ($13.2 million). During its second week, the film grossed $8.4 million (a drop of 15.2%), finishing 6th at the box office.

=== Home media ===
The Night Before was released on DVD and Blu-ray on March 1, 2016, by Sony Pictures Home Entertainment.

== Critical response ==
On Rotten Tomatoes, the film has an approval rating of 68% based on 159 reviews. The site's critical consensus reads, "The Night Before provokes enough belly laughs to qualify as a worthwhile addition to the list of Christmas comedies worth revisiting, even if it isn't quite as consistent as the classics." On Metacritic, the film has a weighted average score of 58 out of 100, based on 31 critics, indicating "mixed or average reviews". Audiences polled by CinemaScore gave the film an average grade of "A−" on an A+ to F scale.

== See also ==
- List of Christmas films
