= List of Iraq War documentaries =

This is a chronological list of Iraq War-related documentaries.

== List ==
- In Shifting Sands (2001)
- Back to Babylon (2002)
- About Baghdad (2003)
- Baghdad or Bust (2004)
- Control Room (2004)
- Inside Iraq: The Untold Stories (2004)
- Iraq Raw: The Tuttle Tapes (2004)
- Last Letters Home (2004)
- Soldiers Pay (2004)
- Uncovered: The War on Iraq (2004)
- Voices of Iraq (2004)
- War Feels Like War (2004)
- War with Iraq: Stories from the Front (2004)
- We Iraqis (2004)
- Alpha Company: Iraq Diary (2005)
- American Soldiers (2005)
- Confronting Iraq: Conflict and Hope (2005)
- The Dreams of Sparrows (2005)
- Gunner Palace (2005)
- In the Shadow of the Palms (2005)
- Iraqi War: The Untold Stories (2005)
- Occupation: Dreamland (2005)
- Off to War: From Rural Arkansas to Iraq (2005)
- Why We Fight (2005)
- Baghdad ER (2006)
- The Corporal's Boots (2006)
- The Ground Truth (2006)
- Iraq for Sale: The War Profiteers (2006)
- Iraq in Fragments (2006)
- My Country, My Country (2006)
- Nice Bombs (2006)
- No Substitute / Victory: Vietnam to Iraq (2006)
- Shadow Company (2006)
- The War Tapes (2006)
- When I Came Home (2006)
- Alive Day Memories: Home from Iraq (2007)
- Body of War (2007)
- Buying the War (2007)
- Ghosts of Abu Ghraib (2007)
- I Am an American Soldier (2007)
- Jerebek (2007)
- No End in Sight (2007)
- Operation Homecoming: Writing the Wartime Experience (2007)
- This Is War: Memories of Iraq (2007)
- Three Soldiers (2007)
- Year at Danger (2007)
- PBS Frontline: Bad Voodoo's War (2008)
- Bulletproof Salesman (2008)
- Changing Us (2008)
- The Corporal's Diary: 38 Days in Iraq (2008)
- Leading to War (2008)
- Fighting for Life (2008)
- Lioness (2008)
- My Vietnam, Your Iraq (2008)
- Reserved to Fight (2008)
- Brothers at War (2009)
- Triangle of Death (2009)
- Poster Girl (2010)
- This is War (2010)
- The Tillman Story (2010)
- The Unreturned (2010)
- The War You Don't See (2010)
- The Iraq War: Regime Change (2013)
- I Want to Live (2015)
- Only the Dead (Australian documentary, 2015)
- Apache Warrior (Netflix documentary film, 2017)
- Medal of Honor (Netflix TV series, 2018)
- Once Upon a Time in Iraq (2020)
- That Which I Love Destroys Me (2015)
- Life After War: Iraq (2022)
