= Axis of Evil (film) =

L'axe du mal
- Directed by: Pascal Lièvre
- Written by: Pascal Lièvre
- Starring: Nathalie Bujold; Pascal Lièvre
- Cinematography: Laurent Carton
- Release date: 20 September 2004 (Athens Film Festival)
- Country: Canada
- Language: French

Axis of Evil (French: L'axe du mal) is a 2004 France-Canada co-production by Pascal Lièvre about a couple declaring their love for each other with the same words United States President George W. Bush used to announce a war on terror.

The short is held in the collections of the Cinémathèque québécoise.

== Release ==
Axis of Evil premiered on 20 September 2004 at the Athens Film Festival. It also screened at the 2004 Oberhausen Short Film Festival and was included in a DVD collection of films shown at the event later that same year. The film has since screened at several other film festivals such as the 2007 MIT Short Film Festival and the 2012 Les Rencontres Internationales du Film Documentaire de Fès.

== Reception ==
Reception for the short has been positive. Andrea Toal covered the short for Sight & Sound, noting that it was "hilarious". The short was also praised by Cornelia Fleer of Film - Dienst and Boris Trbic of Metro Magazine, the latter of whom noted that it received a positive audience reception at the St Kilda Film Festival.

== See also ==
- Baghdad or Bust
- Control Room
- Kill the Messenger
- My Country, My Country
- War Feels Like War
