= My Country, My Country =

2006 documentary film by Laura Poitras

- Promotional poster for My Country, My Country
- Directed by: Laura Poitras
- Written by: Laura Poitras
- Produced by: Laura Poitras
- Music by: Kathem Al Saher
- Distributed by: Zeitgeist Films
- Release date: August 4, 2006
- Running time: 90 minutes
- Country: United States
- Language: English

My Country, My Country is a 2006 documentary film about Iraq under U.S. occupation by the filmmaker Laura Poitras. The film is the first of a trilogy, with the second being The Oath (2010), tells the story of two men whose fateful encounter in 1996 set them on a course of events. The third, Citizenfour (2014), focuses on the NSA's domestic surveillance programs.

== Film ==
Laura Poitras spent over eight months working on her own and for some time following a U.S. Army Civil Affairs team during the elections in Iraq filming the documentary. The film shows life in Iraq for average Iraqis under U.S. occupation. Poitras focuses primarily on Dr. Riyadh al-Adhadh, an Iraqi medical doctor, father of six and Sunni political candidate.

The film was well received by critics and was nominated for an Academy Award for Best Documentary Feature.

The film had a limited U.S. theatrical release. The PBS program P.O.V. broadcast the film in October 2006.

Poitras said that "Since completing My Country, My Country, I've been placed on the Department of Homeland Security's (DHS) watch list" and has been notified by airport security "that my 'threat rating' was the highest the Department of Homeland Security assigns".

The film is one of three in a series, with the second being The Oath (2010). The third, Citizenfour (2014), focuses on the NSA's domestic surveillance programs. She is suing the U.S. government over her 40 detentions by U.S. officials.

== Reception ==
=== Critical response ===
My Country, My Country has an approval rating of 86% on review aggregator website Rotten Tomatoes, based on 36 reviews, and an average rating of 7.09/10. The website's critical consensus states, "This war documentary offers a valuable look at Iraqi life under the U.S. occupation, and finds a compelling central subject in Dr. Riyadh". Metacritic assigned the film a weighted average score of 74 out of 100, based on 18 critics, indicating "generally favorable reviews".

== See also ==
- Axis of Evil
- Baghdad or Bust
- Control Room
- Kill the Messenger
- The Unreturned
- War Feels Like War
- The Oath
- Citizenfour, a 2014 documentary film directed by Laura Poitras about Edward Snowden and the first major disclosure of the National Security Agency's global surveillance system and its use against US citizens.
