= Control Room (film) =

2004 American film by Jehane Noujaim

- Theatrical release poster
- Directed by: Jehane Noujaim
- Written by: Julia Bacha; Jehane Noujaim
- Produced by: Hani Salama; Rosadel Varela
- Starring: Samir Khader; Josh Rushing
- Cinematography: Jehane Noujaim
- Edited by: Julia Bacha; Lilah Bankie; Charles Marquard
- Music by: Thomas DeRenzo; Hani Salama
- Production company: Noujaim Films
- Distributed by: Magnolia Pictures
- Release dates: January 22, 2004 (Sundance); May 21, 2004 (United States)
- Running time: 86 minutes
- Country: United States
- Languages: Mesopotamian Arabic; Modern Standard Arabic; English
- Budget: $60,000
- Box office: $2.7 million

Control Room is a 2004 documentary film directed by Jehane Noujaim, about Al Jazeera and its relations with the US Central Command (CENTCOM), as well as the other news organizations that covered the 2003 invasion of Iraq.

People featured in the film include Lieutenant Josh Rushing, a press officer from US Central Command, David Shuster, an NBC correspondent, and Tom Mintier, a CNN correspondent. Al Jazeera was represented by Samir Khader, a senior producer, Hassan Ibrahim, a Sudanese journalist who attended U.S. universities and headed the BBC Arab News Service before joining Al Jazeera, and Dima Khatib, a Syrian journalist and a producer at Al Jazeera. Samir Khader later became the editor of Al-Jazeera. Josh Rushing started working for Al Jazeera English in 2006, Shuster started working for Al Jazeera America in 2013.

The film had its world premiere at the Sundance Film Festival on January 22, 2004, and was released on May 21, 2004, by Magnolia Pictures. It received positive reviews from critics, but has been criticized for bias. Noujaim has acknowledged this lack of objectivity, stating "I am not saying it is the truth, but it is our truth." The film was nominated for Best Documentary Screenplay from the Writers Guild of America.

== Topics ==
=== Al Jazeera's role in Arab society ===
Control Room documents the spectrum of opinion that surrounds the Qatar television news network Al Jazeera. Throughout the film, US Secretary of Defense Donald Rumsfeld appears at press conferences, complaining about the propagandist nature of Al Jazeera. Paradoxically, another clip shows Muhammad Saeed al-Sahhaf, the Iraqi Minister of Information, accusing the television organization of transmitting American propaganda. The contrasting views between the documentary's central figures are not so clear cut. Early in the movie, press officer Lt. Rushing remarks that Al Jazeera's bias leads it to focus exclusively on American tanks and Iraqi casualties, yet he later confides that agencies such as Fox News also appear to hand-pick their material, and he sees what both sides leave out. Samir Khader, a senior producer of Al Jazeera, claims the network's purpose is to shake up the rigid infrastructure of Arab society, which he believes has fallen behind, culturally and technologically, because of its social intolerance to other cultures and perspectives.

=== Bias in the media ===
Rushing laments about Al Jazeera's bias, and speculates why the network shows no photos of alleged Iraqi military atrocities, such as soldiers holding families hostage. Abdallah Schleifer, an American reporter, counters that no such pictures exist. He has no doubt these atrocities occur. However, he explains that hearsay filtering down through CentCom is not convincing to skeptical Arab viewers; 'That's why pictures of these things are so vital.'

A crucial point in the documentary comes with Lt. Rushing's realization that Fox News displays that same lack of objectivity which he accuses Al-Jazeera of perpetuating - his conclusion drives home the point that media bias is institutionalized on both sides.

Given the subject of this film, pictures are so important because they transcend language. Unless there is concern that they have been contrived, they give useful information to all perspectives. This is what a producer for Al Jazeera claims was the motivation for showing dead American soldiers and Iraqi civilians. As for objectivity, she discards it as 'a mirage'. The film concludes that war is something that makes emotionless involvement impossible for any involved party.

=== Journalist embedding during Iraq War ===
In an effort to rectify past mishandling of media personnel during wartime and to garner support for the Iraq war, the Pentagon introduced a new journalist embedding policy. The policy allowed media "long-term, minimally restrictive access to U.S. air, ground and naval forces through embedding." In its implementation of the policy, the Pentagon expressed recognition of the media's ability to "shape public perception of the national security environment now and in the years ahead… for the U.S. public; the public in allied countries whose opinion can affect the durability of |the| coalition." As many as 775 journalists covered the Iraq War as embedded journalists at the start of the Iraq War, meaning that in addition to reporting on military action in Iraq, the journalists were also required to "live, work, and travel as part of the units." The media embed ground rules introduced in March 2003 stated "Our ultimate strategic success in bringing peace and security to this region will come in our long-term commitment to supporting our democratic ideals. We need to tell the factual story-good or bad- before others seed the media with disinformation and distortions," (Victoria Clarke, Pentagon spokesperson).

=== Freedom of the media ===
One of the central focuses of Control Room is on the alleged friendly fire attack against the Baghdad headquarters of Al Jazeera, on 8 April 2003. The film shows footage of the attack, and film reports that the alleged target was a group of insurgents who opened fire on coalition forces from within the Al Jazeera building, thus justifying retaliatory fire. Much doubt is expressed within as to whether such an explanation is viable. During the attack, one correspondent working for the news network, Tarek Ayyoub, was killed; the film records one subsequent episode during a press conference, when Ayyoub's widow beseeches journalists to 'tell the truth' concerning her husband's death, for the sake of those innocents already killed during the war.

The same day that witnessed the attacks on Al Jazeera also saw attacks on other news networks: a strike by US troops on the Palestine Hotel in Baghdad killed a Spanish TV cameraman and a Reuters cameraman. Claims that US troops were returning fire upon a sniper were "greeted with incredulity by reporters on the ground, including Sky News reporter David Chater, and at Central Command in Qatar." On the same day, Abu Dhabi TV was also hit, "which means the US forces [had] attacked all the main western and Arab media headquarters in the space of just one day." Charter also said that, "Al Jazeera is the best Channel in the world."

The aftermath of the attack saw a number of allegations: Al Jazeera claimed to have sent the Pentagon details of their staff's position via GPS co-ordinates, as did several other news networks. At the time, sources from the BBC noted with alarm that "the Pentagon did not seem to pay heed to information they had been given by Al-Jazeera and every other TV organization based in [Baghdad]." The overwhelming majority of opinion amongst the Arabic media seems to be that the US acted in order to prevent the reporting of war crimes perpetrated by American personnel; the attack on Al Jazeera was thus deliberate, a theory which seems to have support from Robert Fisk. In Control Room, the situation is remarked upon by a senior member of Al Jazeera, who remarks that a small news network cannot hope to combat the forces of the United States; in the face of such an apparent censure by so mighty an opponent, he laments, what may one do but 'shut up'?

== Gaining access to Al Jazeera ==
When director, Jehane Noujaim, and cinematographer, Hani Salama's, initial attempts to contact and gain access to Al Jazeera failed, Noujaim, without much funding or equipment, traveled to Doha, Qatar, the headquarters for both Al Jazeera and the United States' Central Command. After weeks waiting for approval in Al Jazeera's guard office, the filmmakers finally received an audience with Al Jazeera's General Manager, Mohammad Jassem through Abdallah Schleifer, one of Salama's professors from the American University in Cairo. Noujaim was initially only given permission to film for three days. After the three days were up, however, Noujaim notes that she begged to continue shooting, and she was allowed to stay longer.

Although unable to provide much support, personally, Jassem suggested that Noujaim and Salama search Al Jazeera's cafeteria for anyone that they might want to follow. There, Noujaim and Salama discovered both Samir Khader and Hassan Ibrahim, not only central characters to the film but also crucial to gaining the crew access into Al Jazeera. Noujaim explains, "We also met Hassan in the cafeteria over many cups of coffee and many cigarettes, and he was really the person that was responsible for getting us such amazing access to Al Jazeera. I think he was the first person that believed in what we were doing. And he went to the General Manager and said 'Look, I'll take of them. They won't get into the way. They'll just be following me around'" (Noujaim, Audio Commentary). Noujaim and Salama often recorded footage simultaneously, capturing multiple angles or locations for the same moment using the Sony DCR-VX2000 and Sony DSR-PD150 miniDV cameras. Despite having a small production, the lack of lighting or formal setup, granted extra flexibility, allowing Noujaim to follow the pace of the Al Jazeera newsroom and focus more on her subjects. Noujaim explains, "Sometimes it's a good thing to walk around with a broomstick as a boom and your camera half broken. Y'know, look like a very low budget, non-threatening production, and be small" (Noujaim, Audio Commentary).

== Production ==
Control Room was originally to be funded by the BBC, but Noujaim's plan of documenting Al-Jazeera covering the war was passed along to BBC director Ben Anthony, who later produced Al Jazeera Exclusive. One of the reasons Noujaim's film is titled Control Room is that Anthony got exclusive access to the newsroom, which left her to shoot elsewhere, including the control room. Noujaim says she wanted to be at the center of news creation and make a film on the broader perceptions of the war, a reason why she headed to [Al Jazeera]'s headquarters in Doha, which was barely 15 miles away from the Central Command, the military base of the United States. Before leaving for Cairo, when Noujaim called her agents in Hollywood, she was told this was the worst idea ever "since after 9/11 people did not want to watch war, but things that were comforting to them." Noujaim had raised $US60,000 for the film and says she did the film "as cheaply as she could". She rented an inexpensive Pakistani hotel in Doha and called upon her cinematographer friend Hani Salama to join the project. They both carried their own cameras, Noujaim with a Sony VX2000 and Salama with a Sony PD150. Noujaim was only in the Middle East for 30 days to complete filming for Control Room. From the 200-hour footage that was filmed, Noujaim says initially they had six characters, but then decided to review the footage chronologically, picked out the best scenes and characters, and tried to weave each narrative together. Noujaim wanted to "convey surprise, confusion, discovery -- reproduce her own process in making the film". Four editors of different ethnic and cultural backgrounds volunteered their time for six months to complete editing of the film. Payback for everyone involved in the film depended on how well the documentary was received. Noujaim says she edited her movie both in Egypt and in the US, as the contrast between the worlds became central to her understanding of the war.

== Cinéma vérité genre ==
Control Room is a Cinéma vérité film which attempts to present an un-narrated behind-the-scenes focus on the functioning of Al-Jazeera and of the US Central Command during the Iraq War. The film, in its style, recalls The War Room, a cinema vérité documentary by Noujaim's mentors Chris Hegedus and D. A. Pennebaker, which had a similar behind the scene focus on media spinning during Bill Clinton's campaign of 1992.

== Release ==
Control Room premiered at the Sundance Film Festival on January 22, 2004. Shortly after, the film was acquired by Magnolia Pictures. Magnolia stated "Control Room wasn't extreme in filmmaking, but the sort of effect it had on viewers was extreme. People were conditioned in the US to think that Al-Jazeera were rabid, American hating, and will do anything to plant a bomb. But they were reasonable journalists. We rushed the film for release, taking dates, making posters even before the contract had been signed." It was released on May 21, 2004.

== Reception ==
=== Critical reception ===
Control Room received positive reviews from film critics. It holds a 95% approval rating on review aggregator website Rotten Tomatoes, based on 111 reviews, with a weighted average of 7.80/10. On Metacritic, the film holds a rating of 79 out of 100, based on 33 critics, indicating "generally favorable" reviews.

=== Controversies and criticism ===
Control Room has been criticized for partisanship and bias. The film is accused of partisan portrayal where "the Al-Jazeera reporters and characters are shown as stronger characters, while the American reporters she chooses are framed as a motley lot, who are seen shallow, or cynical, or inappropriate as they're seen laughing, challenging, doubting, mocking." Questions have also been raised on the sequence where Al Jazeera's cameraperson Tariq Ayoob is killed by a US A10 aircraft circling overhead. Critics have questioned whether it was really a US aircraft that fired the missile, which Noujaim shows, or the sequence of footage was being rearranged and shots from a completely different incident were used to make a completely different point. Noujaim has defended the criticism of objectivity and treatment by stating "I am not saying it is the truth, but it is our truth."

== Special features ==
The special features that accompany the DVD contain further interviews.

- In one, Hassan Ibrahim states his belief that Bush's actions are just as much terrorism as Bin Laden's, and that any use of violence is terrorism. The unidentified person speaking with Ibrahim retorts "So there is no such thing as terrorism?" Ibrahim goes on to refute the word "terrorism" as a term that is unjustly applied only to Arabs, and unthinkingly adopted by the US media and public.
- In another segment Dima Khatib states that her personal views do not colour what Al Jazeera presents, because "Al Jazeera just presents information". The film further notes that both the Bush administration and radical groups in Iraq (such as elements of Saddam's fallen regime) distrust and dislike Al Jazeera's information.

== See also ==
- Axis of Evil
- Baghdad or Bust
- Kill the Messenger
- My Country, My Country
- War Feels Like War
