= No Joke =

No Joke may refer to

- No Joke (film), documentary
- No Joke, section in Batman: The Killing Joke
- No Joke!, album by the Meat Puppets (1995)
- "No Joke", song by Jay Rock from Follow Me Home
- "No Joke", song by Wishbone Ash from Illuminations
