= Paul Rieckhoff =

American activist

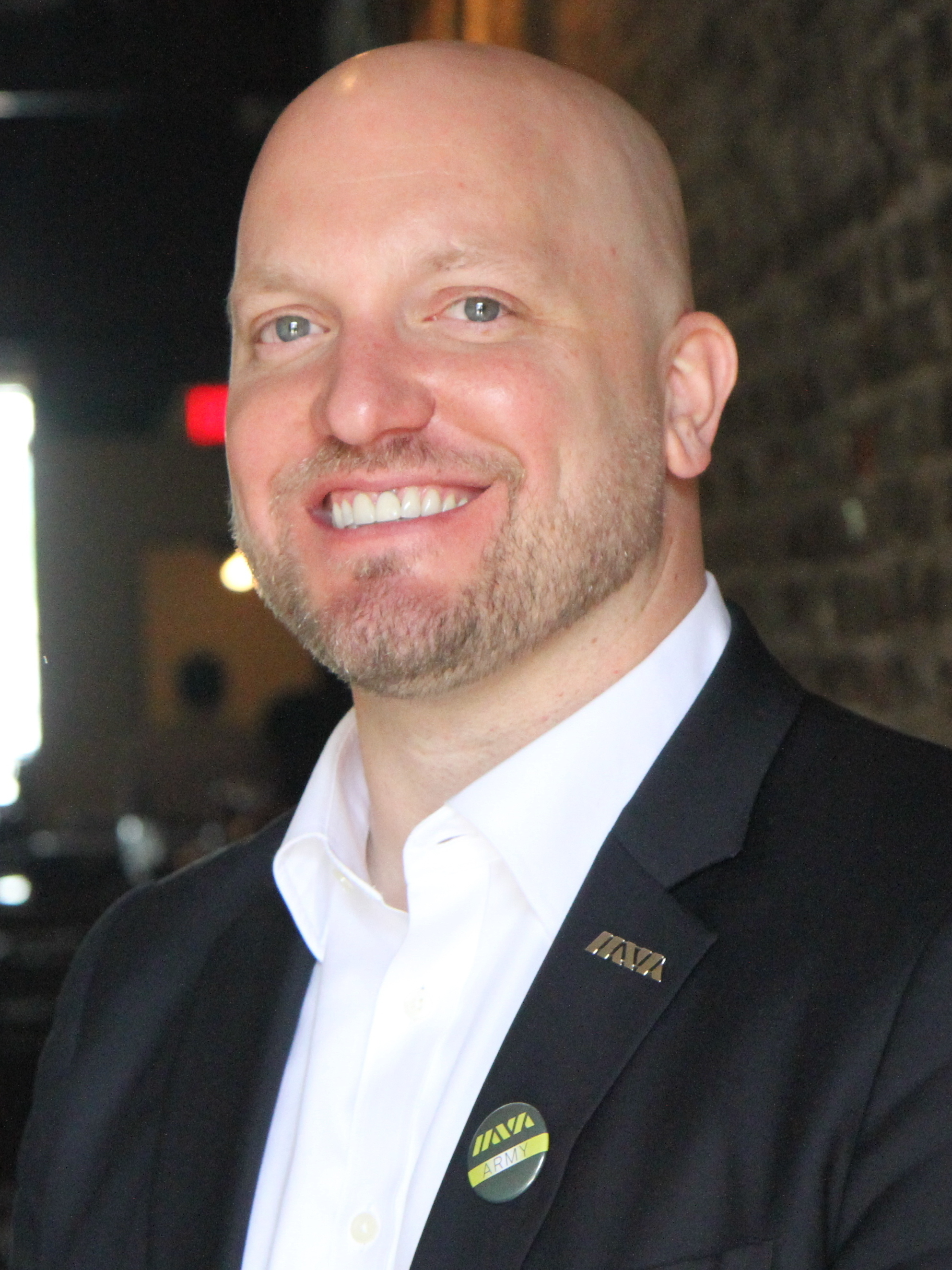
- Born: New York, US
- Education: Amherst College (BA)
- Military career
- Allegiance: United States
- Branch: United States Army
- Service years: 1998–2007
- Rank: First Lieutenant
- Nickname: P.J.
- Unit: 3rd Infantry Division
- Conflicts: Iraq War

Paul Rieckhoff is an American writer, social entrepreneur, activist, and veteran of the United States Army and the Iraq War. He is president of Righteous Media Inc and host of the Independent Americans podcast. After serving as an Army first lieutenant and infantry rifle platoon leader in Iraq, Rieckhoff established the non-partisan non-profit Iraq and Afghanistan Veterans of America (IAVA) in 2004. He was released from the Army National Guard in 2007. Rieckhoff was the 2021 Karl Loewenstein Distinguished Visiting Lecturer in the Political Science Department at Amherst College, where he offered the course "Understanding 9/11" on the 20th anniversary of the September 11 attacks.

== Education ==
Rieckhoff attended James I. O'Neill High School in Highland Falls, New York, and graduated from Amherst College in 1998 with a BA in political science. At Amherst, Rieckhoff was a varsity football and rugby player. He hosted a radio show on the college radio station WAMH-FM and was president of the student government.

== Military service ==
Rieckhoff enlisted in the U.S. Army Reserve on September 15, 1998, and completed Basic Combat Training and Advanced Individual Training at Fort McClellan, Alabama. He then served in the U.S. Army Reserve as a specialist with the 812th Military Police Company. While working on Wall Street in 1999, Rieckhoff transferred to the New York Army National Guard. He graduated from Officer Candidate School in June 2001 and was named a Distinguished Military Graduate. Rieckhoff selected infantry as his branch and joined A Company, 1-105th Infantry (Light).

In 2002, Rieckhoff volunteered for the invasion of Iraq. In January of that year, he was on a plane to join the 3rd Infantry Division at Fort Stewart, Georgia. Rieckhoff was then assigned as a platoon leader in the 124th Infantry Regiment of the Florida Army National Guard. The unit was attached to 1st Brigade, 3rd Infantry Division and spent almost a year conducting combat operations in Baghdad, Iraq.

Rieckhoff was awarded a United States Army Commendation Medal for his service in Iraq.

== Political activism ==
In 2008, Rieckhoff and IAVA supported the passage of the "Post-9/11 (New) GI Bill". On February 7, 2007, he testified before the House Veterans Affairs Committee to advocate for passage of the bill.

On February 13, 2014, IAVA led the creation, passage and signing into law of the Clay Hunt Suicide Prevention for America's Veterans (SAV) Act. The law was named after Marine CPL Clay Hunt, a sniper, IAVA member and personal friend of Rieckhoff and other IAVA leaders. Rieckhoff participated in a signing ceremony at the White House.

== Positions and critics ==
=== On veterans issues ===
Rieckhoff has spoken in favor of veterans, including in conversation with former VA Secretary Eric Shinseki.

=== On the Iraq War ===
Rieckhoff's book Chasing Ghosts is a criticism of the Iraq War and President George Bush.

=== On "Don't Ask Don't Tell" ===
He has been a vocal advocate for gay rights and the repeal of "Don't Ask Don't Tell", as well as reform of the military's sexual assault policies.

=== On the film The Hurt Locker ===
Rieckhoff criticized the film The Hurt Locker (2008), posting a piece in Newsweek titled "Veterans: Why 'The Hurt Locker' Isn't Reality" and appeared on PBS Newshour to state his position.

=== On the film American Sniper ===
Rieckhoff was a strong supporter of the film American Sniper (2014), writing a review for Variety stating "American Sniper is the single best work of film about the Iraq War ever made."

In 2015, Rieckhoff appeared on Comedy Central's The Nightly Show to defend American Sniper as an effective public awareness tool for veterans causes.

=== On Secretary of Defense Pete Hegseth ===
Rieckhoff has been a vocal critic of Pete Hegseth serving as leader of the Department of Defense. He is particularly concerned about Hegseth's ties to Christian nationalism.

== Iraq and Afghanistan Veterans of America ==
After returning home from Iraq in 2004, Rieckhoff founded Iraq and Afghanistan Veterans of America (IAVA), a "nonpartisan organization" which was dubbed "a veterans group with an uncharacteristic liberal bent and a business model that emphasizes online communities over traditional outreach" by The New York Times, for new veterans.

== Public life ==
Rieckhoff has testified before Congress on issues facing the veterans community and writes regularly for national websites and publications. In August 2011, Rieckhoff and four other IAVA members appeared on the cover of Time magazine for a feature about Iraq and Afghanistan veterans being leaders of the "New Greatest Generation".

He was profiled by The Hill in June 2014 in a piece titled "From the battles of Iraq to those of DC".

== Books ==
Rieckhoff wrote the 2006 memoir Chasing Ghosts: A Soldier's Fight for America from Baghdad to Washington describing his tour in Iraq and subsequent activism. He discussed the book on NPR's radio talk show Fresh Air.

== Films ==
Rieckhoff has produced four documentary films (Warrior Champions, Reserved to Fight, Jerabek and When I Came Home) and acted in Green Zone starring Matt Damon.

== Awards, honors, and affiliations ==
Rieckhoff was inducted into the Global Ashoka Fellowship in 2010 as recognition of his innovation and entrepreneurship on behalf of new veterans.

A member of the American think tank Council on Foreign Relations, Rieckhoff is an advocate for Iraqi and Afghan refugees and interpreters and an advisory board member of The List Project, "a non-profit operating in the U.S., founded with the belief that the United States Government has a clear and urgent moral obligation to resettle to safety Iraqis who are imperiled due to their affiliation with the United States of America." He helped bring his former Iraqi translator Esam Pacha (who was targeted for assassination) to the US.

Named #37 of GQ's "50 Most Powerful People in D.C." in 2009.

In 2012, Rolling Stone named Rieckhoff to its list of "The Quiet Ones: 12 Leaders Who Get Things Done".

In 2013, Rieckhoff was named to "The Verge 50" list of "people that changed our lives" alongside leaders like Jeff Bezos, Elon Musk and Marissa Mayer.

Rieckhoff was awarded an honorary Doctor of Humane Letters by Amherst College in 2013.

In 2016, Rieckhoff was elected to the New York State Senate Veteran's Hall of Fame for distinguishing himself both in military and civilian life.

== Press and published works ==
- "Do Unto Your Enemy..." in The New York Times, 25 September 2006.
- Rieckhoff, Paul (2007). Chasing Ghosts: Failures and Facades in Iraq: A Soldier's Perspective. National Geographic Books. ISBN 978-0-451-22121-6.
- "Paul Rieckhoff on SupportOurTroops.org" on The Colbert Report, 5 May 2009.
- "Who Are You Calling Rambo?" in Newsweek, 12 June 2009.
- "When Cinéma Vérité Isn't" in Newsweek, 23 February 2010.
- "Celebrate Independence By Helping Our Veterans" in The Weekly Standard, 4 July 2011.
- "Cost of Treating Veterans Will Rise Long Past Wars" in The New York Times, 27 July 2011.
- "Paul Rieckhoff and Nick Colgin on vet unemployment" on CNN, 5 August 2011.
