= War Feels Like War =

2004 television film

- Directed by: Esteban Uyarra
- Starring: P. J. O'Rourke; Stephanie Sinclair
- Original language: English
- No. of episodes: 1

Production
- Producer: Esteban Uyarra
- Cinematography: Esteban Uyarra
- Running time: 59 minutes
- Production company: In Focus Productions

Original release
- Network: BBC; TV 2 (Denmark); PBS
- Release: 2004

War Feels Like War is a 2004 British documentary film. Made for BBC Storyville and TV 2 (Denmark), it was broadcast in the United States as part of the P.O.V. series. The film "portrays journalists who covered the war in Iraq without the cover of helmets, bullet-proof vests, or the American military."

For three months, in Iraq, Spanish filmmaker Esteban Uyarra followed Jacek Czarnecki, Bengt Kristiansen, Jan Kruse, P.J. O'Rourke, and Stephanie Sinclair, five reporters and photographers, from Denmark, Norway, Poland, and the United States. These journalists circumvented military media control to get access to a different perspective on the Iraq War. As the Coalition of the willing swept into Iraq, some journalists in Kuwait decided to travel in their wake, risking their lives to discover the impact of war on civilians.

The journalists include author P. J. O'Rourke, who was working for ABC Radio, as well as reporters and photographers for news operations ranging from Poland's Radio Zet to Stephanie Sinclair, a photographer for the Chicago Tribune.

== Plot ==
In the film, journalist crews are first seen trying to avoid being penned up in Kuwait City as the war is about to break. Other journalists repeatedly try to get through military zones to capture what is happening.

Once these journalists make it into Iraq, they capture troops at their frazzled ends, cussing. A journalist described a Scud missile "whizzing" by is artfully juxtaposed with a shot of a string of photographers taking a "whiz".

The reporters themselves wrestle with grisly images and the effect it may have on their humanity. One journalist admits she felt, "I'm in over my head", but presses on. Later, she says of a tragic scene she has just witnessed, "If that doesn't affect you, you should find something else to do. That shit should always affect you." The U.S. later bombs the Baghdad hotel where these journalists are staying. After the gunfire stops, a Polish journalist files a radio report that says, "It doesn't look good", adding that a Marine has told him "too many people still have weapons."

== Awards and film critics' views ==
War Feels Like War was awarded Honourable Mention for Best International Documentary by the Hot Docs Canadian International Documentary Festival in Toronto, Ontario, Canada.

In addition, it was shortlisted for the Silver Wolf Competition in the 2003 International Documentary Festival Amsterdam (IDFA) and was awarded the Jury Prize at the 2004 MovieEye Festival in Moscow.

Esteban Uyarra was also nominated in the Best Newcomer category in the 2004 Grierson British Documentary Awards.

The New York Times wrote:

We are placed in amazing close-up as American soldiers search for a sniper on the streets of Baghdad. The soldiers line up suspects on the ground, hands tied behind them, faces in the dust; one puts a boot on a suspect's neck. The film doesn't present easy or polemical answers: the Americans' danger is real and so is their harsh treatment of the Iraqis. And it takes nothing away from embedded reporters to appreciate the lack of constraint in these unattached journalists' stories. These films might leave viewers wondering what direction American war coverage will take, now that there are at least a few signs of change. CBS, after all, showed the first Abu Ghraib photos on 60 Minutes II. Anchors seem less reverential than they were in the first "shock and awe" days of the war; this week when Paul D. Wolfowitz, the deputy defense secretary, testified before Congress about the future of American troops in Iraq, Peter Jennings introduced the report by saying, "Many of the administration's plans are not very clear."

Baltimore Sun television critic David Zurawik stated:

War Feels Like War, a documentary film making its television premiere tonight as part of PBS' 17-year-old P.O.V. series, helps fill [the reporting] void with insight, sensitivity and a keen eye for cinematic detail. The film is firmly grounded in people stories – the gritty specifics of the day-in-day-out lives of several people trying to cover the war outside the Pentagon bubble. But through these personal narratives viewers come to understand in a macro-sense how much was missed in coverage dominated by embedded reporting – or, put another way, how much the U.S. government was able to shape coverage of the war ... Be warned, the film is graphic and vulgar at points. But there is nothing more graphic or vulgar than the reality of death – especially the death of children caught in the path of war. That ancient and ugly truth is one of the primary stories that the government tried to keep the press from telling through its control of embedded correspondents. Thank goodness, not just for the unilaterals who told that story with their pictures and words, but also Uyarra for reminding us how much more difficult it is getting for the media to speak that truth.

David Kronke of the Daily News of Los Angeles states:

This stunning, gritty yet graceful report decisively puts a lie to Paul Wolfowitz's recent assessment that the media covering the war are gutless.

M. S. Mason of The Christian Science Monitor states:

This fascinating documentary follows a few members of the press corps into war zones. Some of them are cynical: human tragedy makes great TV, notes one journalist. A young woman from the Chicago Tribune, however, thinks about the photos she takes. When an older photographer tells her in a few years she'll be just like him, she demurs, smiling. She wants never to become so hardened that human suffering cannot move her.

== See also ==
- Media coverage of the Iraq War
- Axis of Evil
- Baghdad or Bust
- Control Room
- Kill The Messenger
- My Country, My Country
