= American Cinema Editors Awards 2015 =

65th ACE Eddie Awards
- Presented by: American Cinema Editors
- Date: January 30, 2015
- Site: The Beverly Hilton, Beverly Hills, California

Highlights
- Best Film: Drama: Boyhood
- Best Film: Comedy: The Grand Budapest Hotel

The 65th American Cinema Editors Eddie Awards was presented on January 30, 2015 at the Beverly Hilton Hotel, honoring the best editors in films and television.

== Winners and nominees ==
=== Film ===
Best Edited Feature Film – Dramatic:

Sandra Adair – Boyhood

- Joel Cox and Gary Roach – American Sniper
- Kirk Baxter – Gone Girl
- William Goldenberg – The Imitation Game
- John Gilroy – Nightcrawler
- Tom Cross – Whiplash

Best Edited Feature Film – Comedy or Musical:

Barney Pilling – The Grand Budapest Hotel

- Douglas Crise and Stephen Mirrione – Birdman
- Fred Raskin, Hughes Winborne and Craig Wood – Guardians of the Galaxy
- Wyatt Smith – Into the Woods
- Leslie Jones – Inherent Vice

Best Edited Animated Feature Film:

David Burrows and Chris McKay – The Lego Movie

- Tim Mertens – Big Hero 6
- Edie Bleiman – The Boxtrolls

Best Edited Documentary Feature:

Mathilde Bonnefoy – Citizenfour

- Aaron Wickenden – Finding Vivian Maier
- Elisa Bonora – Glen Campbell: I'll Be Me

=== Television ===
Best Edited Half-Hour Series for Television:

Anthony Boys – Veep: "Special Relationship"

- Brian Merken and Tom Roche – Silicon Valley: "Optimal Tip-to-Tip Efficiency"
- Catherine Haight – Transparent: "Pilot"

Best Edited One Hour Series for Commercial Television:

Yan Miles – Sherlock: "His Last Vow"

- Scott Powell – 24: Live Another Day: "10:00 p.m. – 11:00 a.m."
- Scott Vickrey – The Good Wife: "A Few Words"
- Christopher Gay – Mad Men: "Waterloo"
- Elena Maganini and Michael Ornstein – Madam Secretary: "Pilot"

Best Edited One Hour Series for Non-Commercial Television:

Affonso Goncalves – True Detective: "Who Goes There"

- Byron Smith – House of Cards: "Chapter 14"
- Alex Hall – True Detective: "The Secret Fate of All Life"

Best Edited Mini-Series or Motion Picture for Television:

Adam Penn – The Normal Heart

- Regis Kimble – Fargo: "Buridan's Ass"
- Jeffrey M. Werner – Olive Kitteridge: "A Different Road"

Best Edited Non-Scripted Series

Hunter Gross – Anthony Bourdain: Parts Unknown: "Iran"

- Josh Earl and Johnny Bishop – Deadliest Catch: "Lost at Sea"
- Joe Langford & Nick Carew – Vice: "Greenland Is Melting & Bonded Labor"

=== Golden Eddie Filmmaker of the Year Award ===
- Frank Marshall

=== Career Achievement Award ===
- Diane Adler
- Gerald B. Greenberg
