= Josh Rushing =

American journalist (born 1972)

- Born: Joshua Rushing; July 24, 1972 (age 54); Lewisville, Texas, U.S.
- Occupation: Journalist
- Employer: Al Jazeera
- Spouse: Paige Rushing
- Children: 5
- Military career
- Allegiance: United States
- Branch: U.S. Marine Corps
- Service years: 1990–2004
- Rank: Captain
- Conflicts: Iraq War; 2003 invasion of Iraq
- Website: www.joshrushing.com

Josh Rushing is an Emmy Award winning American broadcast journalist and photographer. He is the senior correspondent for the award winning documentary series, Fault Lines, on Al Jazeera English. He is also a former officer of the United States Marine Corps (USMC).

== Early life ==
Rushing was born in Lewisville, Texas, in 1972.

== Career ==
=== Military service ===
Rushing enlisted in the United States Marine Corps in 1990 and completed basic training at Marine Corps Recruit Depot San Diego, California.

He was selected for Public Affairs and attended the Defense Information School (DINFOS) in 1991. He was selected for the Marine Enlisted Commissioning Education Program (MECEP) and studied at the University of Texas at Austin where he received a dual degree in Ancient History and Classic Civilization in 1999. Rushing became a Mustang upon his graduation from UT and moved to Quantico, Virginia, to further his military officer training at The Basic School (TBS). Though slated to be a Marine Corps aviator at TBS, hearing loss prevented Rushing from completing flight school. Instead, he returned to Public Affairs and reported to Marine Corps Air Station Miramar in San Diego, California. Rushing moved to Los Angeles in 2002 where he represented the Marine Corps in Hollywood in the Marine Corps Motion Picture and Television Liaison Office.

Aware of future military operations in the Middle East, Rushing volunteered to deploy with forward units before the invasion of Iraq in 2003. Rushing was assigned to United States Central Command (CENTCOM) in Doha, Qatar, during Operation Iraqi Freedom where he served as a spokesperson to General Tommy Franks. Unbeknownst to him, an independent film, Control Room, captured his efforts to communicate the American message on Al Jazeera Arabic. The documentary debuted at the Sundance Film Festival in 2004 and enjoyed theatrical release across the world. After the Pentagon ordered him not to comment on the film, he left the Marine Corps after 14 years of active duty service in October 2004 and later helped start Al Jazeera English in 2005.

=== Broadcasting work ===
Rushing has been with Al Jazeera English since the run-up to its launch. As an international correspondent, Rushing has hosted and produced programs all over the world. In 2011 Rushing filmed two Fault Lines episodes in Mexico - "Mexico: Impunity and Profits", and "Mexico's Hidden War" - plus a third in Colombia. He has also traveled to Iraq to provide special news coverage marking the 6-month milestone before the planned withdrawal of the U.S. military.

In 2026 Rushing worked on the Fault Lines documentary Killing at Sea, which investigates deaths in the United States strikes on alleged drug traffickers during Operation Southern Spear.

=== Writings ===
Rushing's book, Mission Al Jazeera: Build a Bridge, Seek the Truth, Change the World, was published by Palgrave-MacMillan in 2007. The book blends his personal story with a unique behind-the-scenes look into the controversial Al Jazeera broadcast networks. Rushing is also published in Reader's Digest's 10th Anniversary of 9/11 special edition.

Rushing blogged regularly for AJE and the Huffington Post before beginning his own online journal.

== Personal life ==
He is married, with a daughter and four sons.
