= Linda Goode Bryant =

American film director

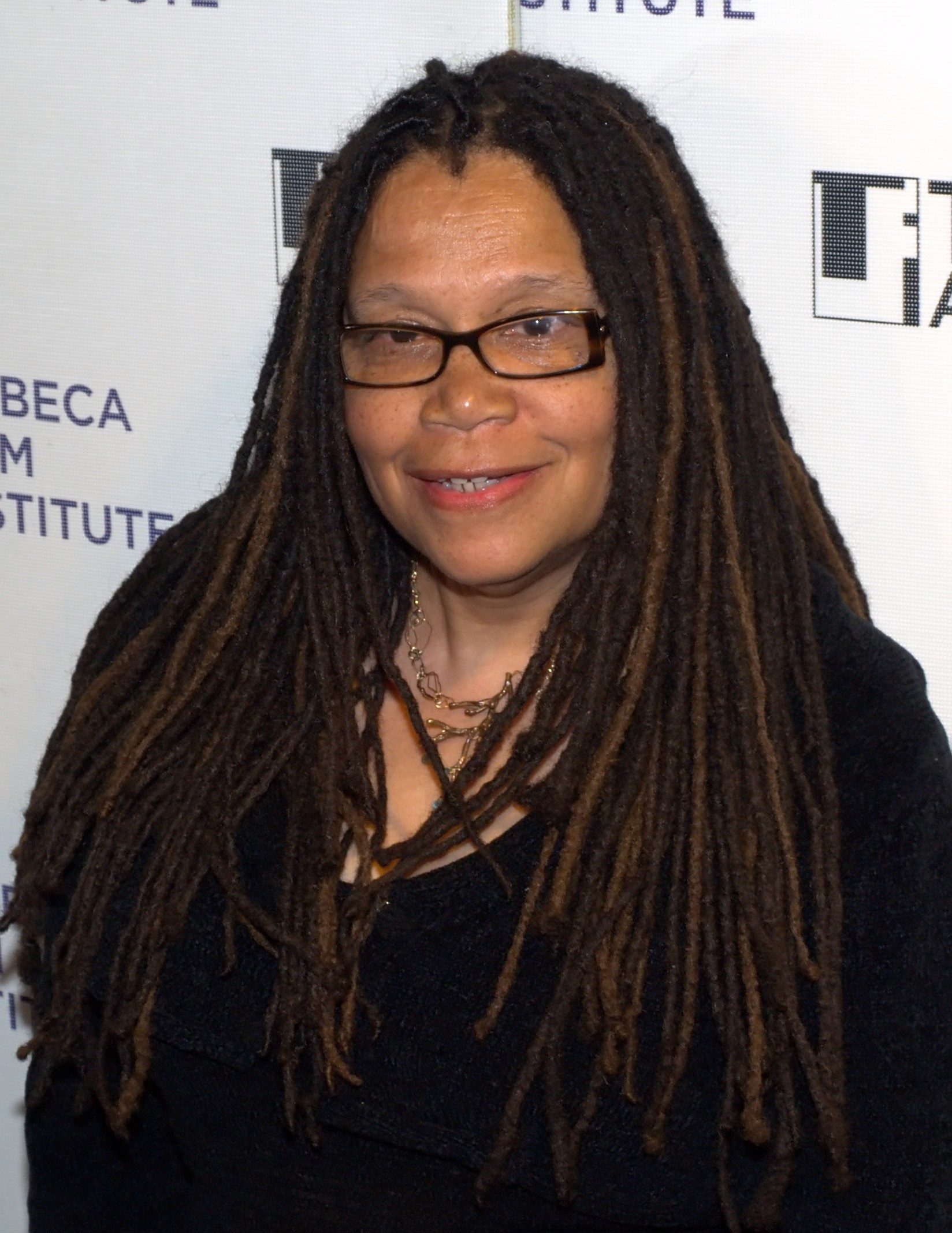
- Goode Bryant in 2010
- Born: July 21, 1949 (age 77); Columbus, Ohio, U.S.
- Education: Spelman College; Columbia University
- Occupations: Documentary filmmaker, activist
- Known for: Founder of gallery Just Above Midtown (JAM)
- Notable work: Flag Wars (film, 2003)
- Awards: Guggenheim Fellow (2004), Anonymous Was A Woman (2020)

Linda Goode Bryant (born July 21, 1949) is an African-American documentary filmmaker and activist. She founded the gallery Just Above Midtown (JAM), which was the focus of an exhibition at the Museum of Modern Art in the fall of 2022, organized by curator Thomas Lax.

In 2009, Goode Bryant started Project EATS, an urban farming initiative for black and brown communities in New York City. The non-profit develops organic farms in areas that do not have access to fresh produce.

== Early life, family, and education ==
Goode Bryant was born in Columbus, Ohio, in what was known as the Near East Side. Her parents are Floyd Goode and Josephine Stewart, and she has a younger brother. At six, she was enrolled in art school at Columbus Museum by her mother. Up until she was twelve years old, Goode Bryant spent much of her time in the Pentecostal Church with her maternal grandmother; she left this church when she was hired as piano player for the less restrictive Asbury Methodist Church. Her religious upbringing left her with a mistrust of extreme Christianity; she remembers questioning the claims of the all-male congregation as a young girl. While her extended family was religious, her parents were socialists and activists who were routinely investigated as potential Communists by the FBI during the era of the "Red Scare."

Columbus was in the process of racially integrating when she was a child, and Good Bryant experienced blatant racism from white people. Goode Bryant attended Franklin Junior High in Columbus, with a majority black student population and majority white teaching population. After a teacher at the school was stabbed by students engaged in a scuffle outside his classroom, the principal began greeting the students every morning with a series of aggressively racist attacks over the loudspeaker. Goode Bryant actively rebelled against the remarks in her homeroom, which landed her in detention every day. She was ultimately expelled from the entire Columbus school system after one of her peers attacked her in the hallway; Goode Bryant refused to cry and plead to the principal for forgiveness after the incident, who labeled her "incorrigible."

After her expulsion, her parents took on a second mortgage to enroll her in the predominately white Ohio State University's K-12 Lab School, which she attended from 8th grade to graduation in 1967. At thirteen, with her parents' permission and in the company of community members, she traveled to Washington D.C. to participate in the March on Washington by herself. While attending University School, Linda Goode Bryant collaborated with the Kappa Alpha Psi fraternity to fund Stokely Carmichael's visit to Ohio State University as a guest lecturer.

In 1972, Goode Bryant received her Bachelor of Arts degree in studio art with a minor in drama at Spelman College in Atlanta, Georgia. During her undergraduate career, she was involved with the Student Non-Violent Coordinating Committee but quickly became disenchanted by the amount of invisible labor the women did and the constant presence of male chauvinism. In her sophomore year, she became pregnant and married a man she later divorced, after the administration made it clear they were not happy with her getting pregnant out of wedlock. The art professors never minded her bringing her child to class, which made an impression on her. After graduation, Goode Bryant briefly returned to Columbus, where she became acquainted with many prominent figures and ran a community center, where she met with members of the Black Panthers about starting a chapter.

Goode Bryant moved to New York City in 1972, shortly after having her second child. She briefly enrolled at City College of New York with the intention of getting her Master's in art history, but found it difficult to manage child care and classes. She left after receiving a graduate internship with the Metropolitan Museum of Art in the Education and Community Programs Department. In 1980, she received her Master of Business Administration degree in management from Columbia University in New York City.

== Career ==
After beginning her Met Internship in 1972, she received a Rockefeller Fellowship for curators, where she worked with Senior Fellow Romare Bearden and co-fellow Marta Vega, who would go on to found the Caribbean Cultural Center. About six months in to the Rockefeller, she took a job as the director of education at the Studio Museum in Harlem. Her work in museums highlighted the racial and gendered disparities in the art world, leading her to found Just Above Midtown (JAM), a gallery that supported African-American artists and artists of color.

=== Just Above Midtown (1974–1986) ===
In 1974, at the age of 24, Goode Bryant founded Just Above Midtown (JAM), a New York City non-profit interdisciplinary artists’ space that spotlighted and supported new work by African-American artists and artists of color, many of whom created abstract work, used affordable materials, and created video and performance art. The gallery was often at financial risk, and Goode Bryant secured the space for $300 per month despite the asking price of $1,000. The first exhibition at the gallery, Synthesis: A combination of parts or elements into a complex whole on view from November 19–December 23, 1974, featured work by David Hammons, Camille Billops, Elizabeth Catlett, and Norman Lewis.

Originally located on West 57th Street, JAM was the first gallery space to exhibit the work of African-American artists and other artists of color in a major gallery district. At JAM’s inception, works by artists of color were primarily exhibited in community centers and cultural institutions in African-American, Native American, Latino and Asian communities. JAM was met with resentment and hostility from nearby galleries. JAM emerged during a recession and was created with the purpose to initiate social change. During this time there was a distinct difference in the value of white artists compared to non-white artists within the art industry. Goode Bryant intended JAM to be a place where black artists could be free from the oppressive views of the commercial industry. JAM played a major role in connecting the black West Coast art scene with the East Coast scene.

In 1980, JAM moved to 178–80 Franklin Street in Tribeca as a result of an increase in rent costs. Tribeca offered a larger space and was located further downtown compared to the location on West 57th Street. While it continued to operate as a commercial gallery and exhibition space, Goode Bryant and her team emphasized live events, such as performances, readings, video screenings, and lectures which included business seminars. In May 1982, Goode Bryant and Janet Henry published the first issue of Black Currant, a broadsheet publication that focused on the work of artists affiliated with JAM.

In 1984, JAM moved to its final location at 503 Broadway and ceased being a commercial gallery, instead functioning as studio space for artists. The gallery hosted a "Brunch with JAM" weekly on Sundays. It also offered a 30 week course called "The Business of Being an Artist." These programs were meant to provide materials and opportunities for artists. Along with these meetings, the staff at the gallery started a preschool to accommodate for a lot of them that were single mothers. JAM's publication Black Currant became B Culture, was edited by Greg Tate and musician and producer Craig Dennis Street, and included features on music, art, literature, and popular culture.

JAM offered artists, many of which are now established figures in the field, early opportunities to show their work including David Hammons, Butch Morris, Senga Nengudi, Lorraine O’Grady, Maren Hassinger, Adrian Piper, Fred Wilson, and Howardena Pindell. Additionally, many famous individuals were in the gallery's orbit, including regular visitor Stevie Wonder. JAM officially closed in 1986.

In 2022, the Museum of Modern Art presented "Just Above Midtown: Changing Spaces," the first museum exhibition on the gallery. It was curated by Thomas J. Lax and was open from October 9, 2022 to February 18, 2023. It presented archival material historicizing the gallery alongside artwork shown at JAM. It was shown in conjunction with the film series JAM Film Screenings, Then and Now, and the JAM Performance Festival. It is also credited in connection with Inside/Out, a series of commissions presented by Project EATS that transformed vacant rooftops into farm space.

=== Filmmaking ===
Goode Bryant co-produced and directed Flag Wars (2003) with Laura Poitras, which became a cinéma vérité Emmy Award-nominated documentary. Flag Wars was filmed over four years and was set in her hometown, Columbus, Ohio. The film explores the tensions that develop white homosexual homebuyers move to a working class primarily black neighborhood resulting in conflicts due to the strong difference in culture and values of each group. This film displays themes of prejudice, gentrification, privilege, poverty, and politics. Goode Bryant and Poitras received the Center for Documentary Studies Filmmaker Award in 2003 for Flag Wars.

She also directed other films, including a segment of Time Piece (2006), a documentary displaying the reflections of several American and Turkish Artists, Hurricane Teens (1998), Can You See Me Now? (2006), and a reality television documentary called Mustafa (2004). Apart from directing, Linda Goode Bryant was also a part of the film Colored Frames, a documentary that looks at the influences and experiences of black artists in the past fifty years.

=== Literary contributions ===
Linda Goode Bryant is a co-author of Contextures (1978) alongside Marcy S. Philips, which is a book that discusses African American artists that have been contributing to the American abstract art lens and the emerging art style, "Contextures," that has developed since the 1970s. As well, she has contributed to the catalog for the exhibition Bad Girls (1994) by Marcia Tucker, with her essay titled "'All That She Wants': Transgressions, Appropriations, and Art."

=== Awards ===
Goode Bryant has been recognized with numerous awards, including a Guggenheim Fellowship (2004) and Peabody Award. In 2020 she was recognized for her achievements by Anonymous Was A Woman, a grant-making organization focused on supporting women artists over 40 years of age. In 2024, Goode Bryant, alongside collaborator T. Lax, was awarded the Brendan Gill Prize by the Municipal Art Society of New York for their exhibition "Just Above Midtown: Changing Spaces" at Museum of Modern Art.

== Activism ==
=== Active Citizen Project (ACP) and Project EATS ===
Goode Bryant is a founder and the executive director of the Active Citizen Project (ACP), a non-profit organization that serves as a catalyst and laboratory for broad-based public activism using art and new media as tools for social change.

Under the auspices of the Active Citizen Project, Goode Bryant also developed Project EATS in 2008 during the Global Food Crisis. Project EATS is a network of New York City urban farms that offers community programs and economic opportunities. She started the nonprofit after finding footage of people in Haiti eating pies made of mud and honey or margarine and salt. This initiative utilizes vacant plots of land within the boroughs of New York and transforms them into farm land, inviting residents of the respective neighborhoods to contribute to this sustainable practice of growing produce to give to produce stands. The farms are found in Manhattan, Brooklyn, The Bronx, and Queens. Not only that, but Project EATS hosts art and community programs for the surrounding residents and community members. A segment of the project, Prepared Eats, was funded by a Mellon Grant.
