= Dirk Wilutzky =

German film producer and director (born 1965)

- Born: 2 February 1965 (age 61); Herleshausen, West Germany
- Occupation: Film producer

Dirk Wilutzky (born 1965 in Herleshausen, West Germany) is a German film producer and director. He won the shared Academy Award for Best Documentary Feature for the 2014 documentary Citizenfour at the 87th Academy Awards in 2015. He is married to film editor Mathilde Bonnefoy, with whom he produced Citizenfour.

== Filmography (selected) ==
=== Director ===
- 2005: The Fleetingness
- 2007: Pitching in Hollywood
- 2011: Was tun?

=== Producer ===
- 2009: Germany 09: 13 Short Films About the State of the Nation
- 2010: Soul Boy
- 2011: Und wir sind nicht die Einzigen
- 2014: Citizenfour

=== Production management ===
- 1998: Wolffs Revier (TV series)
- 1998: Der Clown (TV series)
- 2002: Bowling for Columbine
- 2003: The Soul of a Man
