= No Joke (film) =

- Film poster
- Directed by: Matt Frame
- Produced by: Matt Frame, Nicholas Carefoot, Jean Warburton & Amanda Edgar-French
- Cinematography: Matt Frame
- Edited by: Matt Frame
- Release date: January 12, 2013
- Running time: 109 minutes
- Country: Canada
- Language: English

No Joke is a Canadian documentary released in 2013.

== Storyline ==
No Joke is about three Canadian stand-up comedians who are "rejected as hopelessly unfunny by hometown audiences and thus flee to America for a whirlwind comedy tour (accompanied by intentionally 'unfunny' test subject, Vibrato 3.72 'The Human Vibrator') to determine once and for all whether they have any star potential. Their penultimate comedic judgement comes via private audition for Jamie Masada, owner of the World Famous Laugh Factory in Hollywood, California. The results are hilarious, heartbreaking, and completely unexpected." The film is directed by Matt Frame and is the follow-up to the 2004 film Baghdad or Bust.

== Release ==
No Joke had its World Premiere in Vancouver, Canada on January 12, 2013.
