= The Oath (2010 film) =

- Directed by: Laura Poitras
- Produced by: Laura Poitras, Jonathan Oppenheim, Nasser Arrabyee, Aliza Kaplan, David Menschel
- Cinematography: Kirsten Johnson
- Edited by: Jonathan Oppenheim
- Music by: Osvaldo Golijov
- Distributed by: Zeitgeist Films
- Release dates: January 22, 2010 (Sundance); May 7, 2010 (United States)
- Running time: 90 minutes
- Country: United States
- Language: Arabic

The Oath is a 2010 documentary film directed by Laura Poitras. It tells the cross-cut tale of two men, Abu Jandal and Salim Ahmed Hamdan, whose meeting launched them on juxtaposed paths to al-Qaeda, Osama bin Laden, the September 11 attacks, US military tribunals and the U.S. Supreme Court. The film is the second of a trilogy, with the first being My Country, My Country (2006), documenting the lives of Iraqi citizens during the U.S. occupation of Iraq. The third, Citizenfour (2014), focuses on the NSA's domestic surveillance programs. The Oath is distributed both theatrically and non-theatrically in the US by New York–based Zeitgeist Films.

== Overview ==
The film revolves around Abu Jandal, a taxi driver in San'a, Yemen who had worked as a bodyguard to Osama bin Laden for four years, and Salim Ahmed Hamdan. The latter worked for bin Laden as his driver in Afghanistan, and was captured in 2001 during the US invasion. He was detained as an enemy combatant and transported in 2002 to Guantanamo Bay. Hamdan was the first defendant to be tried in the U.S. military tribunals established by the United States Department of Defense.

The men became brothers-in-law after marrying sisters. The lives of the two men are explored and challenge viewers' ideas about jihad, loyalty and al-Qaeda. The filmmaker, Laura Poitras, inter-cuts Hamdan's trial (his military lawyer challenges the tribunals as unconstitutional and takes Hamdan's case to the US Supreme Court) with Jandal's contradictory conversations with his son and Muslim pupils, and during media interviews.

== Aftermath ==
The Supreme Court challenge was decided in Hamdan's favor and Congress passed a new law, the Military Commissions Act of 2006 to respond to the court's objections. Under that, Hamdan was convicted on one charge but acquitted on another. His sentence gave him credit for time detained and in November 2008, he was transferred to Yemen with one month to serve. He was released but continued to appeal his conviction.

It was upheld in 2011 by the Court of Military Commission Review and appealed to the United States Court of Appeals for the District of Columbia Circuit. On October 17, 2012, the Court vacated Hamdan's conviction. It ruled that the acts he was charged with under the MCA were not war crimes by international law at the time he committed them. This meant that his prosecution was ex post facto and unconstitutional.

== Reception ==
On the review aggregator website Rotten Tomatoes, 88% of 24 critics' reviews are positive. Metacritic, which uses a weighted average, assigned the film a score of 72 out of 100, based on 12 critics, indicating "generally favorable" reviews.

== Awards ==
The film premiered at the 2010 Sundance Film Festival, where it won the "Excellence in Cinematography Award for U.S. Documentary". It was also featured at the Berlin Film Festival in February 2010 and the South by Southwest film festival in March 2010.

The film won a Special Jury Prize from the Best International Feature Documentary award jury at the 2010 Hot Docs Canadian International Documentary Festival.

The director Laura Poitras won the "True Vision Award" at the True/False Film Festival for the creation of the documentary. The film had its television premiere on PBS's show P.O.V. in 2010.

== Film festivals ==
The film was presented at the San Francisco International Film Festival in late April 2010 and the Rio de Janeiro International Film Festival in early October 2010.
