= Active Citizen Project =

: Internet-based activism

- Formation: 2003
- Website: ACP website

The Active Citizen Project (ACP) is a New York City-based non-profit organization founded in 2003 by filmmaker Linda Goode Bryant in response to the 2004 U.S. presidential election. Throughout the United States, ACP engages high school students in internet activism using art and new media.

== Background ==
The organization serves as a catalyst and laboratory for people-generated activism that uses art and new media as tools for social change. According to its website, the goal of its projects is "for people to act on their own behalf for political and social change that ensures their human rights and mutual well-being." ACP activities take place in working class communities and on the internet. The organization was inspired by the Farmers’ Alliance movement of the late 1800s.

The organization is most well known for its Open Caucus (OC) program. OC is an activity that engages high school students in creating social change in their communities using art and new media and engages them in internet activism, connecting them with a global network of actions taking place worldwide. In 2007, ACP worked in Colorado Springs to produce a community art exhibit. Since its inception in 2004, over 5600 students in 28 cities have participated in OC. In December 2007, ACP brought 19 OC students and nine teachers from nine different cities to Des Moines, Iowa to create a documentary film on the Heartland Presidential Forum.

Its flagship program, Project EATS, turned underused spaces in working-class and low-income neighborhoods into sustainable, productive urban farms.
