= Citizenfour =

2014 documentary film by Laura Poitras

- Theatrical release poster
- Directed by: Laura Poitras
- Produced by: Laura Poitras; Mathilde Bonnefoy; Dirk Wilutzky
- Starring: Edward Snowden; Glenn Greenwald; William Binney; Jacob Appelbaum; Ewen MacAskill
- Cinematography: Kirsten Johnson; Trevor Paglen; Katy Scoggin
- Edited by: Mathilde Bonnefoy
- Production companies: HBO Documentary Films; Participant Media; Praxis Films
- Distributed by: Radius-TWC
- Release dates: October 10, 2014 (NYFF); October 24, 2014 (United States)
- Running time: 113 minutes
- Countries: United States; Germany
- Languages: English; German; Portuguese
- Budget: $1 million
- Box office: $3 million

Citizenfour is a 2014 documentary film directed by Laura Poitras about Edward Snowden and the NSA spying scandal. The film had its US premiere on October 10, 2014, at the New York Film Festival and its UK premiere on October 17, 2014, at the BFI London Film Festival. The film features Snowden and Glenn Greenwald, and was co-produced by Poitras, Mathilde Bonnefoy, and Dirk Wilutzky, with Steven Soderbergh and others serving as executive producers. Citizenfour received critical acclaim upon release, and was the recipient of numerous accolades, including Best Documentary Feature at the 87th Academy Awards. This film is the third part to a 9/11 trilogy following My Country, My Country (2006) and The Oath (2010).

== Synopsis ==
Shot from the film trailer for Citizenfour

In January 2013, Laura Poitras, an American documentary film director/producer who had been working for several years on a film about monitoring programs in the United States that were the result of the September 11 attacks, receives an encrypted e-mail from a stranger who calls himself "Citizen Four." (Per a 2014 Vice article featuring Poitras, Snowden chose this codename as a nod to three NSA whistleblowers who came before him: Bill Binney, J. Kirk Wiebe, and Thomas Drake.) In Snowden's initial message to Poitras, he offers her inside information about illegal wiretapping practices of the US National Security Agency (NSA) and other intelligence agencies. In June 2013, accompanied by columnist Glenn Greenwald and The Guardian intelligence reporter Ewen MacAskill, she travels to Hong Kong with her camera for the first meeting with "Citizenfour" in a hotel, who reveals himself as Edward Snowden. Scenes of their meeting take place in Snowden's hotel room, where he maintains his privacy. Shots of Snowden in his bed, in front of his mirror and of the hotel from a distance form the character of Snowden as a trapped political agent.

After four days of interviews, on June 9, Snowden's identity is made public at his request. As media outlets begin to discover his location at the Mira Hotel, Snowden moves into Poitras's room in an attempt to elude phone calls made to his room. Facing potential extradition and prosecution in the United States, Snowden schedules a meeting with the United Nations High Commissioner for Refugees and applies for refugee status. After Poitras believes she is being followed, she leaves Hong Kong for Berlin, Germany.

On June 21, the US government requests the Hong Kong government extradite Snowden. Snowden manages to depart from Hong Kong, but his US passport is cancelled before he can connect to Havana, stranding him in the Sheremetyevo International Airport in Moscow for 40 days. On August 1, 2013, the Russian government grants Snowden temporary asylum for a period of one year. Meanwhile, Greenwald returns to his home in Rio de Janeiro and speaks publicly about United States's utilization of NSA programs for foreign surveillance. Greenwald and Poitras maintain a correspondence wherein they both express reluctance to return to the United States.

Throughout, the film offers smaller vignettes that precede and follow Snowden's Hong Kong interviews, including William Binney speaking about NSA programs, and eventually testifying before the German Parliament regarding NSA spying in Germany.

The film closes with Greenwald, Snowden and Poitras meeting once again, this time in Russia. Greenwald and Snowden discuss new emerging details on US intelligence programs, careful to only write down and not speak critical pieces of information. Greenwald tears these documents creating a pile of scraps, before slowly removing them from the table.

== Cast ==
- Edward Snowden
- Glenn Greenwald
- Laura Poitras
- Ewen MacAskill
- Jacob Appelbaum
- William Binney
- Julian Assange
- Ladar Levison
- Jeremy Scahill
- Sarah Harrison

== Background on Snowden ==
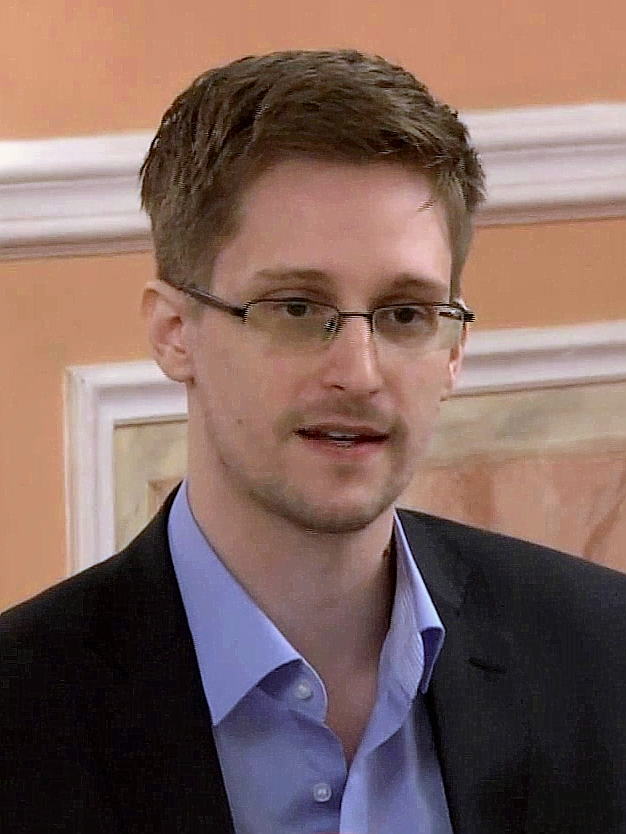
Edward Snowden, October 2013

Born on June 21, 1983, in Elizabeth City, North Carolina, Edward Snowden first became involved with the United States government upon his enrollment in the Army Reserves in the spring of 2004. Snowden claims to have left the program after a few months because he broke his legs in a training accident while a US House of Representatives report claims he had shin splints. He then began working for the CIA in 2006 and was stationed with diplomatic cover at the embassy in Geneva, Switzerland in 2007. After nearly three years with the agency, Snowden resigned his position in February 2009 in order to begin working for a contractor with Dell for the NSA.

It was at this point in his career that Snowden could sense that his views were changing; "I watched as Obama advanced the very policies that I thought would be reined in ... [The NSA] are intent on making every conversation and every form of behaviour in the world known to them". In 2012, Snowden was reassigned from Yokota base in Japan to the Kunia Operations Center in Honolulu, Hawaii, working for Dell before serving as a consultant to Booz Allen Hamilton. As an "infrastructure analyst" at the National Threat Operations Center, he monitored internet communication.

In his own words, the longer he continued to work for the NSA, the more he "worked in to resist" his own feelings regarding the various programs in place at the agency. He had served at the Hawaiian base for approximately 15 months prior to leaving the United States with thousands of classified documents. In 2020, Snowden is still living in exile in Russia and conducted three interviews, one with John Oliver on Last Week Tonight in April 2015 - one with NPR's Fresh Air segment and one with Wired prior to the release of his autobiography Permanent Record on September 12, 2019.

== Production ==
By 2012, Poitras had begun work on the third film in her 9/11 trilogy—following My Country, My Country (2006) and The Oath (2010)—which she intended to focus broadly on the topic of domestic surveillance for which she interviewed Assange, Greenwald, Binney, and Appelbaum. She was first contacted by Snowden in January 2013 after he was unable to establish encrypted communications with Greenwald. She flew to Hong Kong in late May 2013, where, over the course of eight days, she filmed Snowden in his hotel room at the Mira Hotel in Hong Kong. Later, she traveled to Moscow where she filmed a second interview with Snowden conducted by Greenwald.

Production company Praxis Films was involved in the production of the documentary. The film was distributed by RADIUS TWC in the US, BRITDOC Foundation and Artificial Eye in the UK and Piffl Media in Germany. The broadcast rights for television were obtained by Channel 4 (United Kingdom), HBO Documentary Films (USA) and Norddeutscher Rundfunk (Germany).

The soundtrack consists of portions of the Nine Inch Nails album Ghosts I–IV, which was released under a Creative Commons license (BY-NC-SA) in 2008.

=== Security measures ===
Poitras took many security precautions related to the film, described by military writer Peter Maass among others. She moved to Berlin, Germany after being detained repeatedly at border controls when entering the US. She edited the film in Germany after flying directly there from Hong Kong with the Snowden footage, to prevent the FBI from showing up with a search warrant for her hard drives. All the film footage is kept on encrypted drives with multiple levels of nested protection. The computer she uses for reading sensitive documents is separated from the internet by an air gap. Greenwald credited her with a "complete expert level of understanding of how to do a story like this with total technical and operational safety". Maass called Poitras's security skills "particularly vital — and far from the journalistic norm — in an era of pervasive government spying", and quotes Snowden stating that "[i]n the wake of this year's disclosure, it should be clear that unencrypted journalist-source communication is unforgivably reckless."

Producer Bonnefoy has also discussed the encrypted workflow used in making the film, adding "if we have a conversation that's particularly confidential, we'll move the electronics out of the room, or we'll just meet somewhere outside of the editing room, without our phones."

The Film Society of Lincoln Center (which selects films for the New York Film Festival) reported that Poitras changed the location of the initial screening for the NYFF's selection committee several times, in case someone was tracking her movements. The committee was shown a rough cut that had sensitive material redacted, and the NYFF "had to keep the movie's inclusion in the festival under wraps until mid-September" and it was "kept out of festival schedules and documents until we could talk about it openly". The last-minute inclusion in the festival's main slate was an unprecedented event for the NYFF, and "tickets for both screenings sold out within just a few hours".

The film's ending credits unusually name several free software projects and security tools, without which "this film would not be possible". The programs named include Tor, Tails, Debian GNU/Linux, Off-the-Record Messaging, the GNU Privacy Guard, Truecrypt, and SecureDrop. In October 2014, the Electronic Frontier Foundation published an informational page about the software credited in the film, and, in November 2015, Poitras was prominently featured in a Tor fund-raising campaign.

== Release ==
The international film premiere took place on October 10, 2014, in the United States at the New York Film Festival. In Europe, the documentary was shown for the first time on October 17 at the BFI London Film Festival. The first showing in Germany was on October 27 as part of the Leipzig Film Festival. The director Laura Poitras was present in Hamburg at the Abaton cinema for a preview on November 4–5 and at the official German premiere at the Kino International. Its widest release as of January 22, 2015, was 105 theaters, in the weekend of December 12–18, 2014.

It premiered on Home Box Office on February 23, 2015, the day after the 87th Academy Awards and was subsequently released for streaming on HBO Go. Channel 4 broadcast it in the United Kingdom on February 25, 2015 and has released it for view-on-demand through March 4, 2015.

== Reception ==
Citizenfour received widespread critical acclaim. It has an approval rating of 96% on Rotten Tomatoes based on 145 reviews, with an average score of 8.26/10. The site's critics' consensus reads: "Part real-life thriller, part sobering examination of 21st century civil liberties, Citizenfour transcends ideology to offer riveting, must-see cinema." Metacritic gave the film a score of 88 out of 100 based on 38 reviews, indicating "universal acclaim".

Ronnie Scheib of Variety wrote:

No amount of familiarity with whistleblower Edward Snowden and his shocking revelations of the U.S. government's wholesale spying on its own citizens can prepare one for the impact of Laura Poitras's extraordinary documentary Citizenfour... far from reconstructing or analyzing a fait accompli, the film tersely records the deed in real time, as Poitras and fellow journalist Glenn Greenwald meet Snowden over an eight-day period in a Hong Kong hotel room to plot how and when they will unleash the bombshell that shook the world. Adapting the cold language of data encryption to recount a dramatic saga of abuse of power and justified paranoia, Poitras brilliantly demonstrates that information is a weapon that cuts both ways.

Spencer Ackerman writes in The Guardian:

Citizenfour must have been a maddening documentary to film. Its subject is pervasive global surveillance, an enveloping digital act that spreads without visibility, so its scenes unfold in courtrooms, hearing chambers and hotels. Yet the virtuosity of Laura Poitras, its director and architect, makes its 114 minutes crackle with the nervous energy of revelation.

Time magazine rated the film #3 out of its top 10 movies of 2014 and called the film "This Halloween's Scariest Chiller". Vanity Fair rated it #4 out of its top 10 and Grantland rated it #3 of its top 10. Writing for the Chicago Tribune, former Defense Department intelligence analyst Alex Lyda penned a negative review, calling Snowden "more narcissist than patriot". David Edelstein reviewed the film mostly favorably, and jocularly advised viewers "don't buy your ticket online or with a credit card".

The film site Fandor has published an extensive survey of other articles and reviews about Citizenfour, updated through December 25, 2014.

=== Movie's impact ===
On Sept. 18, 2018, it was ruled by the European Court of Human Rights that the U.K. spy agency's bulk collection of telecom data violated the European Convention on Human Rights. The Strasburg-based court ruled 5-2 that the practice "failed to safeguard rights to privacy guaranteed under the human rights convention". The complaint was brought on by ten groups including the ACLU, Privacy International, Amnesty International and other civil liberties groups around the world.

== Lawsuit ==
In December 2014, retired naval officer and oil executive Horace Edwards of Kansas filed suit against the film's producers "on behalf of the American people" for aiding and abetting Snowden's leaks. The Hollywood Reporter provided some legal analysis, noting observers opining that Edwards may not have legal standing to pursue the lawsuit. Edwards also challenged the film's Oscar eligibility on the grounds that Poitras's 2013 short film showing Greenwald interviewing Snowden constituted a previous release of Citizenfour, rendering it ineligible under Oscar rules. The Academy rejected the claim, noting that "The Guardian interview appears in less than two minutes of the documentary", and ruled that Citizenfour was eligible for Oscar consideration.

In February 2015, the filmmakers asked the U.S. District Court for the District of Kansas to dismiss the lawsuit on standing and jurisdictional grounds, and on First Amendment grounds citing Bartnicki v. Vopper. Edwards officially dropped the case on April 3, 2015.

== Awards and nominations ==
Award	Date of ceremony	Category	Recipients and nominees	Result
DOK Leipzig 2014	October 29, 2014	"Leipziger Ring"	Citizenfour	Won
Gotham Independent Film Awards	December 1, 2014	Best Documentary	Citizenfour	Won
IDA Documentary Awards	December 5, 2014	Best Feature	Citizenfour	Won
Cinema Eye Honors	January 7, 2015	Outstanding Achievements in Nonfiction Filmmaking	Citizenfour	Won
Cinema Eye Honors	January 7, 2015	Outstanding Achievements in Direction	Laura Poitras	Won
Cinema Eye Honors	January 7, 2015	Outstanding Achievements in Editing	Mathilde Bonnefoy	Won
Cinema Eye Honors	January 7, 2015	Outstanding Achievements in Production	Laura Poitras, Mathilde Bonnefoy, and Dirk Wilutzky	Won
Cinema Eye Honors	January 7, 2015	Audience Choice	Citizenfour	Nominated
Cinema Eye Honors	January 7, 2015	Outstanding Achievement in Cinematography		Nominated
Critics' Choice Movie Award	January 15, 2015	Best Documentary Feature	Citizenfour	Won
ACE Eddie Award	January 30, 2015	Best Edited Documentary Feature	Mathilde Bonnefoy	Won
Directors Guild of America Award	February 7, 2015	Outstanding Directing – Documentaries	Laura Poitras	Won
BAFTA Awards	February 8, 2015	Best Documentary	Laura Poitras, Mathilde Bonnefoy, Dirk Wilutzky	Won
Satellite Awards	February 15, 2015	Best Documentary Film	Citizenfour	Won
Independent Spirit Awards	February 21, 2015	Best Documentary	Citizenfour	Won
Academy Awards	February 22, 2015	Best Documentary Feature	Laura Poitras, Mathilde Bonnefoy and Dirk Wilutzky	Won
Deutscher Filmpreis	June 19, 2015	Best Documentary Film	Laura Poitras, Mathilde Bonnefoy, and Dirk Wilutzky	Won
Deutscher Filmpreis	June 19, 2015	Best Editing	Mathilde Bonnefoy	Nominated
Deutscher Filmpreis	June 19, 2015	Best Sound Design	Frank Kruse, Matthias Lempert and Alexander Buck	Nominated
Primetime Creative Emmy Awards	September 12, 2015	Exceptional Merit in Documentary Filmmaking	Laura Poitras, Mathilde Bonnefoy, and Dirk Wilutzky	Won
Primetime Creative Emmy Awards	September 12, 2015	Outstanding Cinematography For Nonfiction Programming	Laura Poitras	Nominated
Primetime Creative Emmy Awards	September 12, 2015	Outstanding Directing For Nonfiction Programming	Laura Poitras	Nominated
Primetime Creative Emmy Awards	September 12, 2015	Outstanding Picture Editing For Nonfiction Programming	Mathilde Bonnefoy	Nominated

At DOK Leipzig 2014, when Citizenfour won the Leipziger Ring award, Edward Snowden gave a video message to the festival.

Citizenfour won the 2015 Academy Award for Best Documentary Feature. It was considered the frontrunner heading into the awards; Brent Lang of Variety called for Citizenfour to receive a nomination for the Academy Award for Best Picture, with THR's Gregg Kilday discussing its prospects, but it was not nominated in that category.

Poitras also received several journalistic and humanitarian awards for reporting the Snowden disclosures depicted in the film, including the George Polk award (with Greenwald and MacAskill), the Ridenhour Truth-Telling Prize (with Edward Snowden) the Carl von Ossietzky Medal for human rights (with Greenwald and Snowden), and the Henri Nannen Prize for Efforts for Independence of the Press. The Guardian and The Washington Post received the Pulitzer Prize for Public Service for reporting by Poitras, Greenwald, MacAskill, and Barton Gellman.

== See also ==
- List of films featuring surveillance
- Previous films in trilogy: My Country, My Country (2006) and The Oath (2010)
- No Place to Hide, book by Glenn Greenwald about the Snowden disclosures, including the events depicted in the film
- Snowden, a film directed by Oliver Stone and starring Joseph Gordon-Levitt that depicts parts of the production of Citizenfour
