= Samir Khader =

Iraqi journalist

Samir Khader is the Head of Programs and Current Affairs at Sky News Arabia, after having been the Program Editor & Head of Output of Qatar-based broadcaster Al Jazeera. He was born and raised in Baghdad, Iraq, and lives in Jordan. Khader began his career as a TV journalist in 1979 on French television. He worked for years in Jordan as a journalist in television news before joining Al Jazeera and then Sky News Arabia in Abu Dhabi. He was in Control Room, a documentary film, when he was a senior producer.
