= Janet Henry (artist) =

American artist

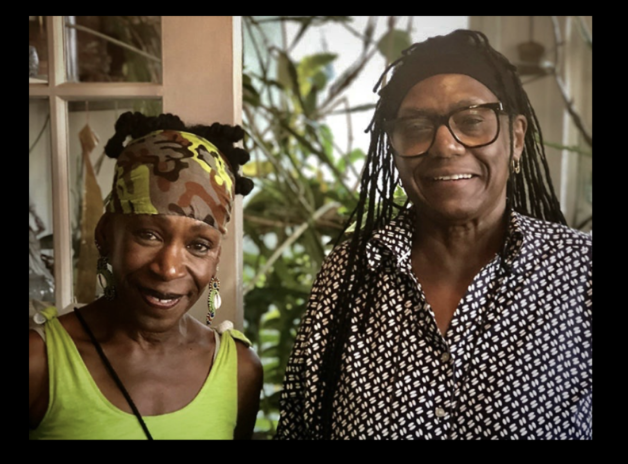
- Janet Olivia Henry (R) with artist Sana_Musasama (L)
- Born: Harlem, New York City, New York U.S.
- Occupation: Visual Artist
- Years active: 1975-present
- Awards: 2001 Penny McCall Foundation Award

Janet Henry is a visual artist based in New York City.

== Early life and education ==
Henry was raised in East Harlem and then in Jamaica, Queens, where she currently lives.

Henry attended the School of Visual Arts and the Fashion Institute of Technology. She was a participant in the Harlem Youth Opportunities Unlimited program (HARYOU) where she met instructor Betty Blayton Taylor. In 1974, Henry was a recipient of a Rockefeller Fellowship in Museum Education at the Metropolitan Museum of Art.

== Career and artistic contributions ==
Janet Henry's artistic work spans multiple mediums: collage and text-based work, jewelry, and sculpture/installations using multimedia materials. Her work often comments on American culture, including white male patriarchy, by making use of toys, dolls, and miniatures in her art installations. In the 1980s, she was known for creating and photographing necklaces and bracelets that featured sequences of materials. The work that she has completed has been showcased in solo and group exhibitions over the years.

In partnership with filmmaker Linda Goode Bryant, Henry produced Black Currant, a magazine which highlighted the experimental work of artists who were showcased by Just Above Midtown Gallery (JAM). The magazine was later known as B Culture and featured early works of Greg Tate. In the 1970s, Henry also worked in the Education Department at the Studio Museum in Harlem, where she collaborated with artist Carrie Mae Weems.

Janet is a funder and educator contributing at the New York State Council on the Arts, Jamaica Center for Arts and Learning, Lower Eastside Girls Club, and currently works at the Brooklyn Heights Montessori School.

== Activism ==
Janet Henry was vocally opposed to the exhibition The Nigger Drawings by Donald Newman at Artists Space and refused to show her own work in that gallery because of this show title. The exhibition was widely protested for the racism of this exhibition name by artists including Carl Andre, Howardena Pindell, May Stevens, and Lucy Lippard who saw this incident as a key indicator of the systemic racism within the art world. Henry was also outspoken about the implicit racism of Women's Action Committee.

== Exhibitions ==
Henry's artwork has been exhibited in various shows and venues such as PPOW Gallery, the New Museum, the Studio Museum in Harlem, the Newark Museum, Artists Space, and Just Above Midtown.

=== Solo exhibitions and installations ===
- Lower Eastside Girls Club Community Gallery, "Two's", NYC, 2004
- Cedar Crest College, Recent Work, Curated by Cynthia Hawkins, Allentown, PA, 2003
- PPOW, "American Anatomy and Other Work", NYC, 2002
- John Jay College, "In Situ," NYC, 1998
- Hallwalls, "American Anatomy," Curated by Sara Kellner, Buffalo, NY, 1995
- Pulse Art, "American Anatomy," NYC, 1995
- Seventh Second Photo Gallery, "Social Commentary Sewn-up in Vinyl," Curated by Wendy Tiefenbacher, NYC, 1992
- Snug Harbor Cultural Center, Staten Island, NY, "Collecting, Organizing and Transposing," Curated by Olivia Georgia, NYC, 1990
- Public Art Fund, "Messages to the Public: Eventually," NY, 1988
- Various Sites in Queens, "American Anatomy," NY, 1986
- Studio Museum in Harlem, "From the Studio: Artists-in-Residence," NYC, 1983
- Just Above Midtown Gallery, "Janet Henry Retroactive," NYC, 1982
- Basement Workshop, "Handel Was No Fool," NYC, 1981
- The Exhibitions Gallery, "Drawings and Other Things," Jamaica, NY 1978

=== Selected group exhibitions and installations ===
- Jamaica Center for Learning and Arts, "What Comes out of Our Textbooks," Queens, New York 2021
- Queens Museum, "Queens International 2018: Volumes," Curated by Sophia Marisa Lucas and Baseera Khan, NYC, 2018
- A.I.R. Gallery, "Dialectics of Entanglement: Do We Exist Together?" Curated by Roxana Fabius and Patricia M. Hernandez, NYC, 2018
- York College Fine Arts Gallery, "Southeast Queens Biennial: A Locus of Moving Points," Curated by NLE Curatorial Lab, NYC, 2018
- Brooklyn Museum, "We Wanted a Revolution," Curated by Catherine Morris, NYC, 2017
- FiveMyles Gallery, "No Place Like Utopia," Curated by Matt Freedman, NYC, 2008
- City Without Walls, Corridor Gallery, "Close to the Edge," Curated by Reynolds and Kevin Sampson, Newark, NJ, NYC, 2008
- Bedford Hills Correctional Facility, "Inside/Out", Curated by Duston Spear, NY, 2008
- Indiana State University, "Contemporary Women Artists," Curated by Judy Collischan, Terre Haute, Indiana, 2005
- Light Work, Menschel Gallery, "Ties that Bind," Syracuse University, 2002
- Center for Photography at Woodstock, "We are Named," Curated by Susan Evans, NY, 2001
- Exit Art, "Choices 99," Selected by Carrie Mae Weems, NYC, 1999
- Art Resources Transfer, NYC, 1999
- Giordano Gallery, "The Bead...," Cathy Valenza, Dowling College, Oakdale, NY, 1999
- Lemmerman Gallery, Jersey City University, "Picture/Image/Word," Mauro Altamura, 1998
- PPOW Gallery, "Rights of Spring," Curated by Carrie Mae Weems, NYC, 1998
- 1612 Pine Street, "Summer Camping," Curated by Dean Daderko, Philadelphia, PA, 1998
- PS 122 Gallery, "Shake: An Exhibition of Snow Domes," Curated by Jane Harris, NYC, 1998
- Dorfman Projects, "Tip of the Iceberg," Art Resources Transfer, NYC, 1998
- Betty Rymer Gallery, Art Institute of Chicago, "Sexting Myths: Representing Sexuality in African American Art," Curated by Kymberly Pinder, 1998
- Henry Street Settlement, "Stiches," Curated by Kathleen Spicer, NYC, 1997
- Kingsborough Community College Art Gallery, "Figuring Woman's Lives," Janice Farley, 1997
- Abington Art Center, "New American Portraits," Dean Daderko, Jenkintown, PA, 1996
- The Drawing Center, "Cultural Economics: Histories from the Alternative Arts Movement," Curated by Julie Ault, NYC, 1996
- Algira Center of Contemporary Art, "With All Deliberate Speed: Revisiting Race and Education," Curated by Howard McCalebb and Carl Hazelwood, Newark, NJ, 1996
- Manhattan Borough President's Gallery, "Through Our Eyes - By Women About Women," Curated by Laura Litchfield, 1996
- Anderson Gallery, "X-Sightings," Buffalo, NY, 1996
- New Museum, "Human/Nature," Benefit Exhibition, NYC, 1995
- 494 Gallery, "Pride and Prejudice," Shari Diamond and Honor LaSSale, NYC, 1995
- The Gallery at Hunter College, "Beyond Circumstance," Curated by Margeret McInroe, NYC, 1995
- 42nd Street Development Project and Creative Time, NYC, 1994
- Puffin Room, "Identity Crisis," Curated by Laurie Ourlicht and Kenny Schacter, NYC 1994
- Art in General, "Little Things," Curated by Holly Block, NYC, 1994
- Momenta, "Yes I Am - No I'm Not," Curated by Laura Parness and Eric Heist, NYC 1994
- New Museum, "Bad Girls," Curated by Marsha Tucket, NYC, 1994
- Artists Space, "Artists Select," Selected by Lanie Lee, NYC, 1994
- Longwood Art Gallery, "Urban Masculinity," Curated by Bettie-Sue Hertz and Calvin Reid, Bronx, NY, 1993
- Real Art Ways, Hartford, CT, 1994
- AC Project Room at 303 Gallery, "Welcome Edition," Curated by Paul Bloodgood and Alissa Friedman, NYC, 1993
- Artists Space, "Activated Walls," Curated by Carlos Solana, NYC 1993
- Momenta, "The Art of Self Defense and Revenge," Laura Parness and Eric Heist, NYC 1993
- Queens Museum at PaineWeber Gallery, Curated by Phyllis Billick, NYC, 1992
- 494 Gallery, "Race and Culture," Curated by Suzanne Nicholas, NYC 1991
- Maryland Art Place, "Collecting, Organizing and Transposing," Olivia Georgia, Baltimore, MD
- Anderson Gallery, Richmond, VA, 1989
- Aljira Center for Contemporary Art, "Art from the African Diaspora: Survival," Curated by Lorenzo Pace, Newark, NJ, 1988
- Diverse Works, "Coast to Coast," Organized by Faith Ringgold and Clarissa Sligh, Houston, TX, 1988
- Intar Gallery, "In Her Own Image," Curated by Howardena Pindell, NYC, 1988
- White Columns, "Resistance (Anti-Baudrillard)" Curated by Group Material, NYC, 1987
- Longwood Arts Project, "Toys Art Us," Curated by Fred Wilson, Bronx, NY, 1986–87
- The Clocktower, "Progressions: A Cultural Legacy," Curated by Vivian Browne, Emma Amos and Julia Hotten, NYC 1986
- Longwood Arts Project, "In the Tropics," Curated by Kellie Jones, Bronx, NY, 1986
- California State College, Stanislaus at Turlock, "Exchange of Resources: Expanding Powers," Curated by Rebecca Ballenger, 1983
- Just Above Midtown Gallery, "A Love Story," Curated by Kathleen Gonchorov, NYC, 1983
- School of Visual Arts, "Transmogrify, "Selected by Caren Rosenblatt, NYC, 1983
- Ohio State University Gallery, "All's Fair in Love and War in Feminist Art,"Curated by Lucy Lippard, Columbus OH, 1983
- University of South Florida, Tampa, "Henry, Hill, Payne," 1983
- Hamilton College, "The Regentrified Jungle," Curated by Joe Lewis, Clinton, NY, 1983
- Franklin Furnace, "Allegory of an Artist's Career," with Sydney Blum, NYC, 1981
- Studio Museum in Harlem, "En Route," Curated by Patricia Monan Bell, NYC, 1981
- A.I.R. Gallery, "The Dialectics of Isolation," Kazuko, Ana Mendietta and Zarina, NYC, 1981
- 626 Gallery, "Private Worlds," Curated by Joyce Kozloff, NYC 1981

== Awards ==
- Penny McCall Foundation, Award, NYC, 2001
- Art Matters Foundation, Artist's Fellowship, NYC, 1994
- Flushing Council on Culture and the Arts, Cash Prize, "Artists Choose Artists," 1994
- New York State Regional Initiative, "Artists Projects," 1994
- Public Art Fund, Spectra-Color Board Commission, "Messages to the Public," NYC, 1987
- New York State Council on the Arts, Visual Artists-sponsored Project, 1985
- PS1, Studio Recipient, Long Island City, NY, 1983
- Public Art Fund, Mural Commission, Jamaica, NY, 1975
- School of Visual Arts, Scholarship, NYC, 1964

== Residencies ==
- Light Work Visual Studies, One Month Residency, Syracuse, NY, 2000
- Yaddo, Three Week Residency, Saratoga Springs, NY, 1998
- Studio Museum in Harlem, Artist-in-Residence, NY, 1983
