= Dima Khatib =

Syrian journalist

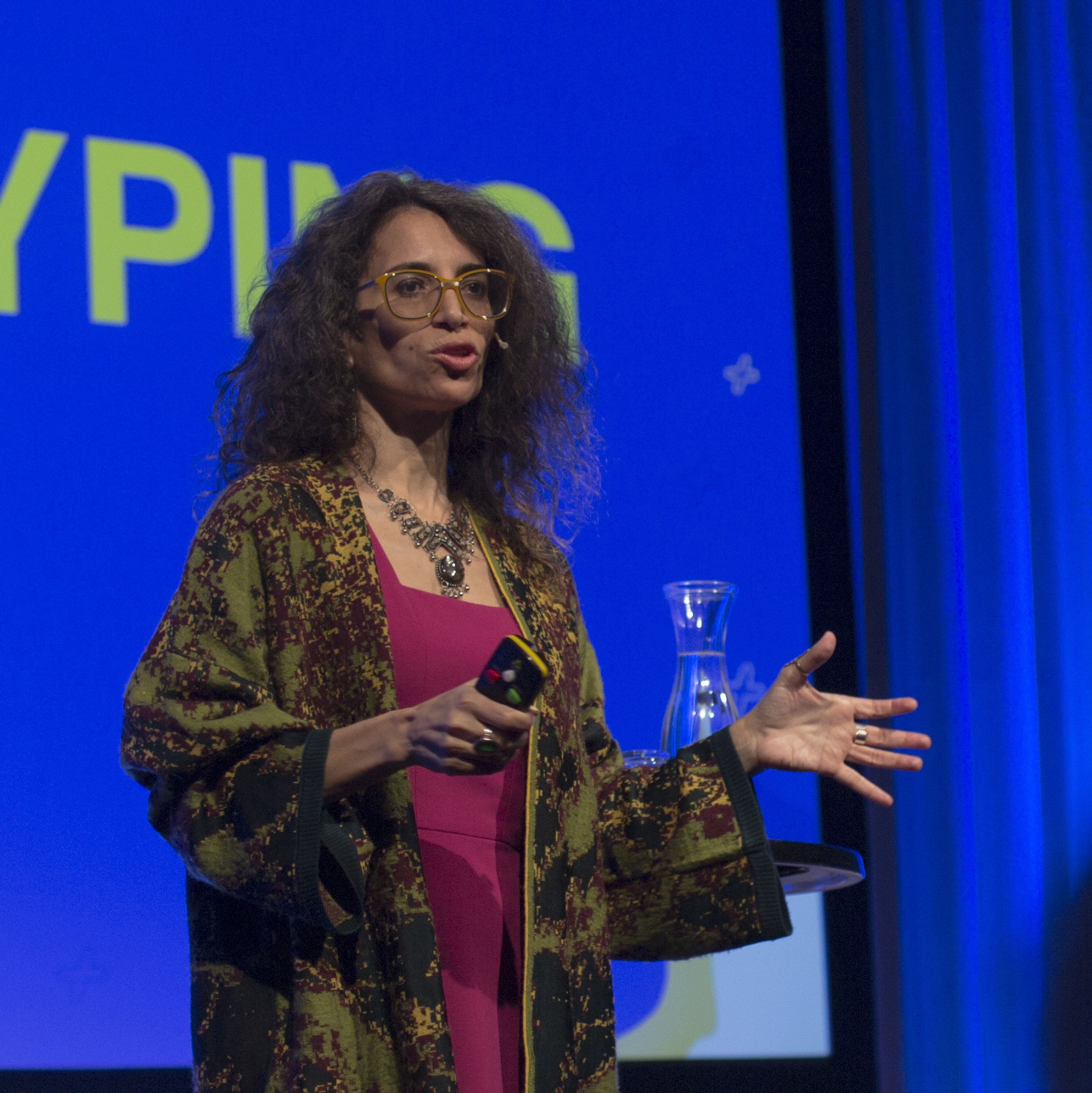
- Born: 1971 (age 54–55); Damascus, Syria

Dima Khatib (Arabic: ديمة الخطيب) is a (Syrian- born) Palestinian journalist, poet and translator. She is the managing director of AJ+, an award-winning digital news service in English, Arabic, French and Spanish launched by Al Jazeera Media Network in San Francisco, USA. She is currently the only female executive director within the Al Jazeera group and one of few female leaders in the Arab media sphere.

== Biography ==
Khatib was born in Damascus to a Syrian mother and a Palestinian father. Khatib speaks ten languages (Arabic, English, French, Spanish, Portuguese, Italian, Chinese, German, Swahili, and Greek). She joined Al Jazeera back in 1997 as a junior intern in broadcast journalism to become a producer, correspondent in China and then Latin America Bureau Chief before making a total shift to internet journalism in recent years.

== Career ==
Khatib has been classified among the most influential Arabs on Social Media. She received attention during Arab revolutions for providing frequent updates and commentary about recent events via her Twitter account. Today she tackles all kinds of issues on her social feeds, including social media, media, motherhood, poetry, Palestine and others.

She started earning recognition during the Iraq War, when she worked as a live news producer in Doha for Al Jazeera Arabic Channel. She gave an interview to CNN's Larry King and Wolf Blitzer, and was featured in Control Room, a 2004 documentary film about Al Jazeera and its coverage of the 2003 invasion of Iraq.

During her assignment in Latin America she had exclusive and close access to the late Venezuelan President Hugo Chávez and interviewed several leaders such as Bolivia's Evo Morales and Brazil's Lula da Silva. Reporting from all over South and Central America she gave the Arab World an unprecedented insight into a far-away continent. From Caracas she would be cited as the source of breaking news such as Chávez being the first head of state to harshly condemn Israel over the Israeli-Lebanon conflict and cutting ties with Israel years later. She also dismissed the claims that Gaddafi has escaped to Venezuela.

She lectured journalism at the American University in Dubai (AUD) between 2013–2015 and gives talks around the globe. She organizes regular poetry recitals in cities across the Persian Gulf region, as well as Europe and both North and Latin America.

Prior to her work with Al Jazeera, Khatib has worked for Swiss Radio International in Bern and World Health Organization in Geneva, as well as Al-Raya Newspaper and Qatar Radio in French in Doha.

== Publications ==
=== Poetry ===
- Love Refugee (Arabic: لاجئة حب), collection of poems in Arabic; available on Jamalon.

=== Nonfiction ===
- (coauthored) A book in Spanish about Arab Revolutions.
