= Flag Wars =

- DVD cover
- Directed by: Linda Goode Bryant; Laura Poitras
- Produced by: Linda Goode Bryant; Laura Poitras
- Starring: 2003
- Cinematography: Laura Poitras
- Edited by: Linda Goode Bryant; Erez Laufer
- Music by: Graham Haynes
- Release date: 2003
- Running time: 86 minutes
- Country: United States
- Language: English

Flag Wars is a 2003 American documentary film about the conflict between two communities during the gentrification of a Columbus, Ohio neighborhood. Filmed in a cinéma vérité style, the film is an account of the tension between the two historically oppressed communities of African Americans and gays in Columbus' Olde Towne East neighborhood. The film was nominated for an Emmy Award and won three awards, including a Peabody Award.

== Synopsis ==
Flag Wars is a look inside the conflicts that surface when black working-class families are faced with an influx of white gay homebuyers to their Columbus, Ohio neighborhood. Filmed over four years, Flag Wars’ “as-it-is-happening” cinéma vérité style captures the emotions and honesty of unguarded moments as tensions mount between neighbors.

== Awards ==
Flag Wars and filmmakers Linda Goode Bryant and Laura Poitras won the 2003 CDS Filmmaker Award at the Full Frame Documentary Film Festival, the 2003 SXSW Competition Award at the SXSW Film Festival, and a 2003 Peabody Award. It was also nominated for the 2004 Truer than Fiction Award at the Independent Spirit Awards and a 2004 Emmy Award.
