= Mathilde Bonnefoy =

French film editor and director (born 1972)

- Born: 11 March 1972 (age 53); Paris, France
- Occupations: Film editor, director

Mathilde Bonnefoy (born 11 March 1972) is a French film editor and director who was nominated for an ACE Eddie Award for the editing of the film Run Lola Run (1998) and who won the award for editing the documentary Citizenfour (2014). She and her husband Dirk Wilutzky additionally served as producers of Citizenfour with its director Laura Poitras, and the three received the 2014 Academy Award for Best Documentary Feature.

Bonnefoy was born in Paris, and is the daughter of the French poet Yves Bonnefoy and Lucy Vines, an American; she has dual citizenship in France and the United States. From 1990 to 1991 she studied philosophy at the Sorbonne, but she abandoned her studies to move to Berlin. By 1995 she was working as an assistant editor, and in 1997 she was credited as the "Avid assistant" for the German film Das Leben ist eine Baustelle (directed by Wolfgang Becker).

Das Leben ist eine Baustelle was one of the first films produced by the film company X Filme Creative Pool, which was created by Becker and Tom Tykwer (among others). Tykwer, who was the screenwriter for Das Leben ..., recruited Bonnefoy as the editor of Run Lola Run (1998), which he was directing. This film enjoyed international critical and box office success. It garnered Bonnefoy a Deutscher Filmpreis (the Academy Awards of Germany) for editing, as well as the ACE Eddie nomination.

Since Run Lola Run, Bonnefoy has edited several more films with Tykwer and with the director Wim Wenders. Her editing of Tykwer's film Three (2010) won her a second Deutscher Filmpreis. In recent years she has also directed and edited films for German television.

Bonnefoy is credited as both the editor and as a producer for the 2014 documentary Citizenfour that was directed by Laura Poitras. She earned Cinema Eye Honors for outstanding achievement in editing and the ACE Eddie Award for best edited documentary feature. She shared Citizenfour's Best Documentary Oscar with her fellow producers Laura Poitras and Dirk Wilutzky, and was nominated for a third Deutscher Filmpreis for Best Editing for that film.

In June 2015, Bonnefoy was announced as one of the 322 invitees to become a member of the Academy of Motion Picture Arts and Sciences that year. She was invited by both the Documentary branch, for her work on Citizenfour and Invisibles; and by the Film Editing branch, for her work on Citizenfour and Run Lola Run. The seven invitees who received invitations from multiple branches must select one branch on accepting membership. New members will be welcomed into the Academy at a closed reception in September 2015.

== Filmography ==
This filmography of editing credits is based on the listing at the Internet Movie Database; the director of each film is indicated in parentheses.

- 1998: Run Lola Run (Tom Tykwer)
- 2000: The Princess and the Warrior (Tom Tykwer)
- 2002: Heaven (Tom Tykwer)
- 2002: Twelve Miles to Trona (episode of the film Ten Minutes Older: The Trumpet) (Wim Wenders)
- 2003: The Soul of a Man (Wim Wenders)
- 2004: True (short - Tom Tykwer)
- 2006: The Favor (Eva S. Aridjis)
- 2007: Invisibles (segment "Invisible Crimes", directed by Wim Wenders)
- 2007: Solstice (Daniel Myrick)
- 2009: The International (Tom Tykwer)
- 2010: Orly (Angela Schanelec)
- 2010: Three (Tom Tykwer)
- 2014: Citizenfour (Laura Poitras); Bonnefoy was also a producer for this documentary film.

== See also ==
- List of film director and editor collaborations
- Das Modell by Rammstein
