= When I Came Home =

- Directed by: Dan Lohaus
- Release date: 2006
- Running time: 70m
- Country: United States
- Language: English

When I Came Home is a 2006 documentary by Dan Lohaus about homeless veterans in the United States - from those who served in Vietnam to those returning from the Iraq War. The film won the "New York Loves Film Best Documentary" Award at the 2006 Tribeca Film Festival.

== Content ==
The film looks at the challenges faced by returning combat veterans and the battle many must fight against the Veterans Administration for the benefits promised to them. Through the story of Herold Noel, an Iraq War veteran suffering from post-traumatic stress disorder and living out of his car in Brooklyn, it reveals a failing system and the veteran's struggle to survive after returning from war. The film reports that as of March 2006, 500 Iraq War veterans are homeless.

== Production ==
In addition to Noel, Paul Rieckhoff the Executive Director and Founder of Iraq and Afghanistan Veterans of America (IAVA), makes several appearances in the film. Rachel Maddow and Chuck D, talk radio hosts of the Air America Radio network, also make a brief appearances in the film.

- MPAA rating: not rated
- Running time: 70 minutes

== See also ==
- Veterans Administration
- Homelessness in the United States
- Veteran
