= The Dreams of Sparrows =

- Directed by: Hayder Daffar
- Release date: 2005
- Running time: 74 minutes
- Countries: Iraq; United States
- Languages: Arabic; English

The Dreams of Sparrows is a documentary film about post-war Iraq, by Hayder Daffar of the Iraq Eye Group, an Iraqi filmmaking group. The film was shot throughout 2003 and 2004 with a hand-held camera, consisting of street-level interviews with Iraqi citizens and explores their feelings about the changes occurring around them. The film was produced by digitally sending footage to the United States via e-mail where it was assembled in rough sequences and posted on the internet. A DVD version of the film was released in 2005.

Dreams of the Sparrows offers many differing viewpoints in its interviews. Some Iraqis place photos of U.S. President George W. Bush in shrines, while others oppose the presence of American forces. Some admit a longing for the days of Saddam Hussein's rule, while others, having survived torture under his regime, express happiness with his removal.

The capture of Hussein occurred during filming and street interviews cover the topic. In the film, one of the photographers was allegedly killed by US forces before the film was completed.
