= Tom Mintier =

American journalist (1947–2016)

- Born: December 1, 1947; Mount Vernon, Ohio, U.S.
- Died: September 18, 2016 (aged 68); Thailand
- Occupation: Reporter
- Writing career
- Language: English and Thai
- Years active: 1980–2016

Tom Mintier (December 1, 1947 – September 18, 2016) was a correspondent for CNN who covered a number of historic events.

== Career ==
He was hired by CNN in 1980. In 1986, Mintier was one of only two TV broadcasters live on-air when the Space Shuttle Challenger disaster occurred (the other being Kent Shocknek).

In November 1989, he reported live from the Brandenburg Gate at the Berlin Wall. In April 1992, he became the CNN Bangkok, Thailand bureau chief. While still a correspondent for CNN, he was also located at the United States Central Command near Doha, Qatar, at the start of the Iraq war.

In August 1999, he reported live from Pristina, Kosovo, following the NATO victory over the invading Serbian armed forces.

On January 1, 2000, he was the CNN London bureau chief. He appeared in the 2004 documentary film Control Room and other films. Mintier died in Thailand on September 18, 2016.
