= Iraq and Afghanistan Veterans of America =

Nonprofit veterans' organization

- Abbreviation: IAVA
- Formation: 2004
- Type: War veterans organization
- Purpose: "IAVA's mission is to connect, unite and empower post-9/11 veterans."
- Headquarters: New York, New York
- Founder and CEO: Paul Rieckhoff
- Website: iava.org

Iraq and Afghanistan Veterans of America (IAVA), is a nonprofit 501(c)(3) veterans organization founded by Paul Rieckhoff, an American writer, social entrepreneur, advocate, activist and veteran of the United States Army and the Iraq War. He served as an Army First Lieutenant and infantry rifle platoon leader in Iraq from 2003 through 2004. Rieckhoff was released from the Army National Guard in 2007.

== Founding and purpose ==
IAVA was founded in 2004 by Iraq War veteran Paul Rieckhoff to provide resources to and community for post-9/11 veterans. The organization is headquartered in New York City and maintains a policy office in Washington, DC. IAVA's mission is to unite, empower and connect post-9/11 veterans through education, advocacy, and community. Its programs include non-partisan advocacy on Capitol Hill, data-driven research on post-9/11 veteran issues, veterans transition assistance through its Rapid Response Referral Program (RRRP), and community building through its VetTogether and online community events.

In 2012 Stars and Stripes reported that "IAVA representatives are frequent cable news guests and regulars at hearings on Capitol Hill, where few if any veterans initiatives are passed without their blessing." The Washington Post has stated that "With its ability to talk intimately about both the horror of combat and the difficulty of coming home...[IAVA]...has emerged as a key player on veterans issues on the Hill." In regards to IAVA's CEO Paul Rieckhoff, Senator Patty Murray (D-WA) has been quoted as saying, "He's relentless. When [Paul Rieckhoff] brings a new issue to me, I know that's what I should be fighting for."

In early 2019, Paul Rieckhoff stepped down as CEO and transitioned to the Board. His COO, Jeremy Butler, a Navy veteran, was elevated to the position. Butler continues to press on with an ambitious agenda, in the characteristic style of IAVA.

According to IAVA, the organization has over 425,000 members. IAVA membership is free and is available to "all veterans, families, and civilian allies."

== Advocacy ==
IAVA has been involved in, and at times led, the passage of a number of pieces of legislation since its establishment. The organization publishes an annual policy agenda that focuses on recommendations for Congress, the Executive Branch, Private Sector, State Nonprofits and other stakeholders.

The IAVA Policy Agenda lists various veterans issues that the organization is engaged in with its "Big Six" priorities:

1. Combat Suicide Among Troops and Veterans
2. Reform the VA for Today's Veterans
3. Initiate Support for Injuries from Burn Pits
4. Defend Veteran and Military Education Benefits
5. Fully Recognize and Improve Services for Women Veterans
6. Establish Support for Veterans Who Want to Utilize Medical Cannabis

== Legislative accomplishments ==
116th Congress

- 9/11 First Responders (2019): IAVA joined again with 9/11 First Responders to pass the Never Forget the Heroes: James Zadroga, Ray Pfeifer, and Luis Alvarez Permanent Authorization of the September 11th Victim Compensation Fund Act (S. 546/H.R. 1327). Signed into law on July 29, 2019 (Public Law No: 116-34).
- Combating Veteran Suicide (2019): IAVA helped develop and introduce the Commander John Scott Hannon Veterans Mental Health Care Improvement Act (S. 785), to expand efforts aimed at ending veteran suicide.
- Burn Pits Accountability Act (2019): In 2019, IAVA continued its campaign to raise awareness of military exposure to burn pits and other airborne toxins while deployed with the reintroduction of the Burn Pits Accountability Act (H.R. 5671 / S. 3181).
- She Who Borne The Battle: In early 2019, IAVA continued its campaign to better recognize the service of women veterans and fill gaps in care for them at the VA. The centerpiece of the campaign is the Deborah Sampson Act (S. 514), revised from the 11th Congress and re-introduced. IAVA also worked to develop the Honoring All Veterans Act (H.R. 3010) to establish a gender neutral motto for the VA.

See a comprehensive listing of IAVA’s supported legislation and legislative victories for the 116th Congress.

115th Congress

- She Who Borne The Battle (2017): IAVA launched this campaign to better recognize the service of women veterans and fill gaps in care for them at the VA. The centerpiece of the campaign was the Deborah Sampson Act (S. 681/H.R. 2452).
- Burn Pits Accountability Act (2018): IAVA launched a campaign to raise awareness of military exposure to burn pits and other airborne toxins while deployed. The centerpiece of the campaign was the Burn Pits Accountability Act (H.R. 5671 / S. 3181) to improve Department of Defense accountability and VA research.
- Defend the GI Bill (2017–18): In 2017, IAVA was successful in advocating for the passage into law of the Harry W. Colmery Veterans Educational Assistance Act (S. 1598/H.R. 3218) which expanded benefits under the Post-9/11 GI Bill. Signed into law on August 16, 2017 (Public Law No: 115-48). IAVA spent much of the year successfully turning back an attempt to pay for the new legislation through the establishment of a $2,400 fee levied on new servicemembers. IAVA launched a campaign to turn back a 2018 decision by the Department of Defense to limit the ability to transfer unused portions of the Post-9/11 GI Bill to family members to those servicemembers with less than 16 years of service. A petition with more than 50,000 signatures was sent to then-Defense Secretary James Mattis.

See a comprehensive listing of IAVA’s supported legislation and legislative victories for the 115th Congress.

114th Congress

- Defend The GI Bill (2016): In 2016, the House and Senate Veterans' Affairs Committees introduced veterans omnibus bills that include significant cuts to the Post-9/11 GI Bill. Through advocacy on Capitol Hill, in the media, and grassroots efforts by its members, IAVA has been successful in holding off passage of that legislation into law.
- Female Veteran Suicide Prevention Act (2016): IAVA successfully advocated for legislation (S. 2487/H.R. 2915) that requires the VA to include metrics on women veterans in evaluation of mental health and suicide prevention programs, among other provisions. The bill was signed into law on June 12, 2016.
- James Zadroga 9/11 Health and Compensation Reauthorization Act (2015): IAVA joined forces with the Feal Good Foundation and 9/11 first responders and survivors to secure a fully funded 75-year extension of the World Trade Center Health Program Fund and five-year, $4.6 billion Victim Compensation Fund extension, which helps provide care to 9/11 first responders.
- Clay Hunt Suicide Prevention for American Veterans (SAV) Act (2015): IAVA developed and led the campaign to pass the Clay Hunt SAV Act and ensured that it was one of the first pieces of legislation passed by the 114th Congress. It was signed into law by the President on February 12, 2015. The SAV Act expands access to mental health care for military and veterans; strengthens oversight of military mental health care programs, among other provisions.

113th Congress

- Ending the VA Backlog (2013): IAVA advocated to end the backlog of veterans' disability claims at the VA. With the help of allied organizations, IAVA prompted the VA to implement reforms to its claims processing system. These efforts resulted in the number of veterans waiting over 125 days to receive compensation for service-connected disabilities to decrease by over 60 percent.
- Combating Military Sexual Assault (2013): IAVA has been an advocate for reforms to the military justice system that protect victims of military sexual assaults and prevent future assaults. In 2013, IAVA successfully advocated to include thirteen amendments in the National Defense Authorization Act of 2014 (NDAA) that improve victims' rights, strengthen prevention efforts, and protect whistleblowers within the 2014 National Defense Authorization Act of 2014. The organization has continued with this advocacy in the current 114th Congress.

112th Congress

- VOW to Hire Heroes Act (2011): IAVA successfully advocated to pass this law, which addresses the career challenges veterans face in transitioning from combat to career. The legislation requires separating service members to take the Transition Assistance Program that provides job search resources like resume and career counseling. This law also establishes tax credits of up to $9,600 for every veteran hired and begins the work of translating military skills and training into their civilian equivalents.

111th Congress

- New GI Bill 2.0 (2010): In 2010, IAVA worked to pass the Post-9/11 Veterans Educational Assistance Improvements Act, also known as the New GI Bill 2.0. The legislation expanded the Post-9/11 GI Bill to include veterans studying at vocational schools, granted National Guardsmen and Reservists responding to national disasters full benefits, and simplified the Yellow Ribbon Program. These new provisions benefitted almost 400,000 veterans in their first year.
- Mandatory Mental Health Screening (2009): IAVA successfully advocated to pass this bill which mandates that every returning service member is screened for mental health injuries, helping remove the stigma of seeking help and catching mental health injuries early.

110th Congress

- Post-9/11 "New" GI Bill (2008): IAVA played the lead role in passing the Post-9/11 GI Bill, considered by many to be the most important veterans' benefit for the generation of post-9/11 veterans. This landmark legislation has sent more than one million veterans to college.
- Joshua Omvig Suicide Prevention Bill (2007): This legislation has worked to address the veteran and service member suicide epidemic. It helped establish the Veterans' Crisis Line that has served more than half a million veterans in crisis, instituted better suicide prevention training for VA staff, and launched a campaign to reduce the stigma of seeking mental health care.

== Research ==
IAVA regularly publishes data-driven research reports to educate on the issues pertaining to post-9/11 veterans. The purpose of these reports is to drive the development of solutions to benefit veterans and their families. These reports include:

- IAVA 2018 Annual Member Survey
- IAVA 2015 Annual Member Survey
- IAVA 2014 Annual Member Survey
- IAVA 2013 Annual Member Survey
- Unsung Heroes: Military Families After 10 Years of War
- New York's Newest Veterans: Key Findings and Policy Implications of the RAND Corporation's Needs Assessment of New York State Veterans
- Red Tape: Veterans Fight New Battles for Care and Benefits
- Women Warriors: Supporting She 'Who Has Borne the Battle
- Careers After Combat: Employment and Education Challenges for Iraq and Afghanistan Veterans
- Coming Home: The Housing Crisis and Homelessness Threaten New Veterans
- Invisible Wounds: Psychological and Neurological Injuries Confront a New Generation of Veterans

== Rapid Response Referral Program (RRRP) ==
IAVA's Rapid Response Referral Program (RRRP) provides support to service members, veterans, and their families who need resources and assistance. The RRRP program is staffed by a team of transition managers who connect veterans to resources that can support their needs on issues relating health, financial, housing, legal, employment, etc.

== VetTogethers ==
IAVA's VetTogethers are local events that are organized by its members through IAVA's social network website myIAVA. These events are meant to connect veterans to their community and build awareness and friendships.

== Board of directors ==
The IAVA Board of Directors provides leadership, assistance, and counsel to the organization. The current Board of Directors includes:

- David Angelo, Founder & Chairman, David & Goliath
- Barry Bloom, Chief Executive Officer, Tisch Financial Management (TFMG Associates, LLC)
- Adam Clampitt, President, The District Communications Group.
- Steve Costalas, Senior Vice President, General Counsel, and Secretary at Vencore, Inc.
- Greg D'Alba, President of Global Sales and Marketing, WME/IMG.
- Eli Elefant, CEO of PBC USA.
- Scott Feldmayer, Partner, Barbaricum [Chairman of the Board]
- Kenneth Fisher, 2016 Civilian Leadership Honoree; Partner, Fisher Brothers; Chairman and CEO, Fisher House Foundation.
- Jeff Marshall, Vice President, Global Head of Customer Support at FitBit
- Craig Newmark, Founder, Craigslist and CraigConnects.
- General (Ret.) David H. Petraeus, Member and Chairman, KKR Global Institute.
- Paul Rieckhoff, Founder and CEO of IAVA, President of Righteous Media Inc.
- Kristen Rouse, President & Founding Director, NYC Veterans Alliance
- Wayne Smith, Veterans Advocate
- Dan Streetman, Senior Vice President of Worldwide Strategic Sales and Operations, BMC Software.
- Bharat Vasan, former CEO of Pax Labs

Former Members of the IAVA Board include:

- Joe Abruzzese, President of Advertising Sales, Discovery Networks.
- Peter Berg, Actor, Film Director, Producer, and Writer at Film 44.
- Ryan Manion Borek, President, Travis Manion Foundation.
- Bonnie Carroll, President and Founder, Tragedy Assistance Program for Survivors.
- Les Gelb, Lifetime Achievement Award Honoree; Vice Chairman, IAVA Board; Chairman Emeritus, Council on Foreign Relations.
- Rosanne Haggerty, Treasurer, IAVA Board; President, Community Solutions.
- Jim Hirschmann, Chairman, IAVA Board; CEO, Western Asset Management Company.
- Jamie Horowitz, President of FOX Sports National Networks.
- Patrick J. Kennedy, Co-Founder, One Mind; Founder, Kennedy Forum; Former U.S. Representative, Rhode Island.
- Norman Lear, Film and Television Executive Producer, Writer and Director, and Social Activist.
- Michael Leven, Former President and COO, Las Vegas Sands Corp.
- Yannick Marchal, Exotic Derivatives Trader, Deutsche Bank.
- Jeff Marshall, Director of West Coast Community Operations, Uber.
- J.R. Martinez, Actor, Author, Motivational Speaker, and Army Veteran.
- Bruce E. Mosler, Chairman of Global Brokerage, Cushman & Wakefield Inc.
- Command Sergeant Major (Ret.) D. Wayne Robinson, Education Advocate and Former CEO of Student Veterans of America.
- Ed Vick, Chairman Emeritus, IAVA; Former CEO of Young & Rubicam, Inc.
- James Wright, President Emeritus and Eleazar Wheelock Professor of History at Dartmouth College.

== 2016 Commander-in-Chief Forum ==
On September 7, 2016, IAVA hosted a live televised Commander-in-Chief Forum with presidential candidates Hillary Clinton and Donald Trump. The first of its kind, it focused exclusively on issues pertaining to defense, foreign policy, and veterans. The Forum was presented by NBC News and MSNBC and was moderated by former TODAY Show co-anchor Matt Lauer from the Intrepid Sea, Air & Space Museum in New York City. The audience were mostly veterans and active duty service members.

The forum generated controversy among some supporters of Libertarian candidate Gary Johnson because he was not invited to the event.^{[25]} ^{[26]} On September 1, 2016, IAVA invited Gov. Johnson and Dr. Jill Stein, the Green Party candidate, to participate in an upcoming Commander-in-Chief forum of veterans issues. The Johnson campaign distanced themselves from any protests and considered the invitation.^{[27]}

== Leadership ==
- Paul Rieckhoff (U.S. Army veteran): Founder & CEO from 2004 to 2019
- Jeremy Butler (U.S. Navy veteran): CEO from 2019 to 2023
- Allison Jaslow (U.S. Army veteran): CEO from 2023 to 2025
- Kyleanne Hunter (U.S. Marine Corps veteran): CEO from 2025 to present

== Firsts ==
In 2023 Allison Jaslow became the CEO of IAVA, making her the first woman to lead IAVA and, according to military.com, "the first openly gay head of a major veterans service organization".
