= Laura Poitras =

American documentary director and producer (born 1964)

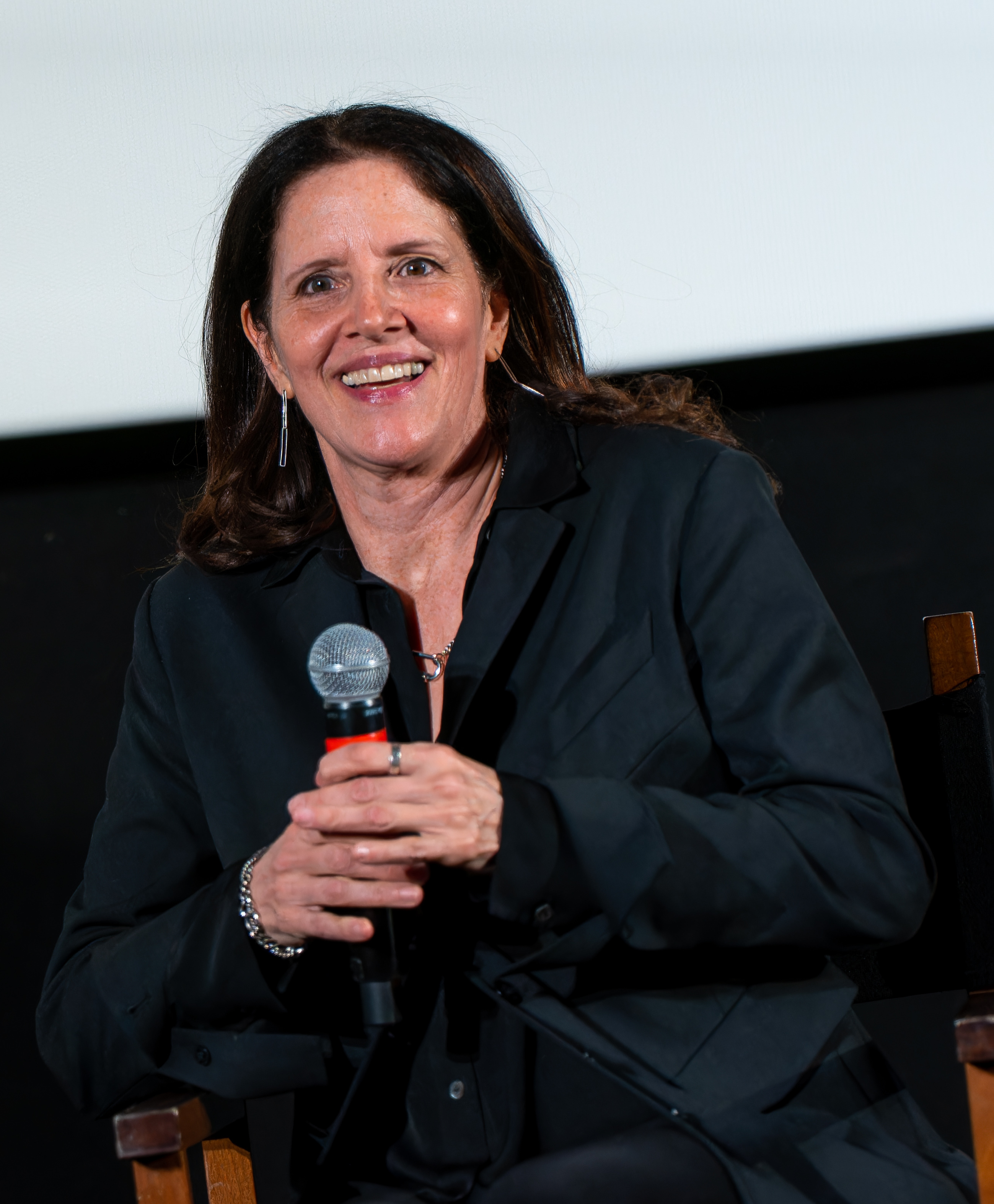
- Poitras in 2023
- Born: February 2, 1964 (age 62); Boston, Massachusetts, U.S.
- Education: The New School
- Occupations: Director; producer
- Website: praxisfilms.org

Laura Poitras (/ˈpɔɪtrəs/; born February 2, 1964) is an American director and producer of documentary films.

Poitras has received numerous awards for her work, including the 2015 Academy Award for Best Documentary Feature for Citizenfour, about Edward Snowden, while My Country, My Country received a nomination in the same category in 2007. She won the 2013 George Polk Award for national security reporting related to the NSA disclosures. The NSA reporting by Poitras, Glenn Greenwald, Ewen MacAskill, and Barton Gellman contributed to the 2014 Pulitzer Prize for Public Service awarded jointly to The Guardian and The Washington Post. In 2022, her documentary film, All the Beauty and the Bloodshed, which explores the career of Nan Goldin and the fall of the Sackler family, was awarded the Golden Lion, making it the second documentary to win the top prize at the Venice Film Festival. The film then won a Peabody Award at the 84th ceremony in 2024 for "capturing the zeal of an artist eager to use her work to create a new vision for and of the world."

She is a MacDowell Colony Fellow, 2012 MacArthur Fellow, the creator of Field of Vision, and one of the initial supporters of the Freedom of the Press Foundation. She was awarded the I.F. Stone Medal for Journalistic Independence by Harvard's Nieman Foundation in 2014.

Poitras was one of the founding editors of the online newspaper, The Intercept. On November 30, 2020, Poitras was fired by First Look Media, the parent company of The Intercept, allegedly in relation to her criticism of The Intercept's handling of the Reality Winner controversy.

== Early life ==
Born in Boston, Massachusetts, Laura Poitras is the middle daughter of Patricia and James Poitras, who in 2007 donated $20 million to found The Poitras Center for Affective Disorders Research at McGovern Institute for Brain Research, part of the Massachusetts Institute of Technology.

Growing up, Laura planned to become a chef, and spent several years as a cook at L'Espalier, a French restaurant located in Boston's Back Bay neighborhood. However, after finishing Sudbury Valley School, she moved to San Francisco and lost interest in becoming a chef. Instead she studied at the San Francisco Art Institute with experimental filmmakers Ernie Gehr and Janis Crystal Lipzin. In 1992, Poitras moved to New York to pursue filmmaking. In 1996, she graduated from The New School for Public Engagement with a bachelor's degree.

== Career ==
Poitras co-directed, produced, and shot with Linda Goode Bryant her documentary, Flag Wars (2003), about gentrification in Columbus, Ohio. It is an "intriguing sociopolitical docu". It received a Peabody Award, Best Documentary at both the 2003 South by Southwest (SXSW) film festival and the Seattle Lesbian & Gay Film Festival, and the Filmmaker Award at the Full Frame Documentary Film Festival. The film launched the 2003 season of the PBS TV series POV. It was nominated for a 2004 Independent Spirit Award and a 2004 Emmy Award. Poitras's other early films include O' Say Can You See... (2003) and Exact Fantasy (1995).

Her film My Country, My Country (2006), about life for Iraqis under U.S. occupation, was nominated for an Academy Award. The Oath (2010), concerns two Yemeni men caught up in America's war on terror, won the Excellence in Cinematography Award for U.S. Documentary at the 2010 Sundance Film Festival. The two films form parts of a trilogy. The last third Citizenfour (2014) details how the war on terror increasingly focuses on Americans through surveillance, covert activities, and attacks on whistleblowers.

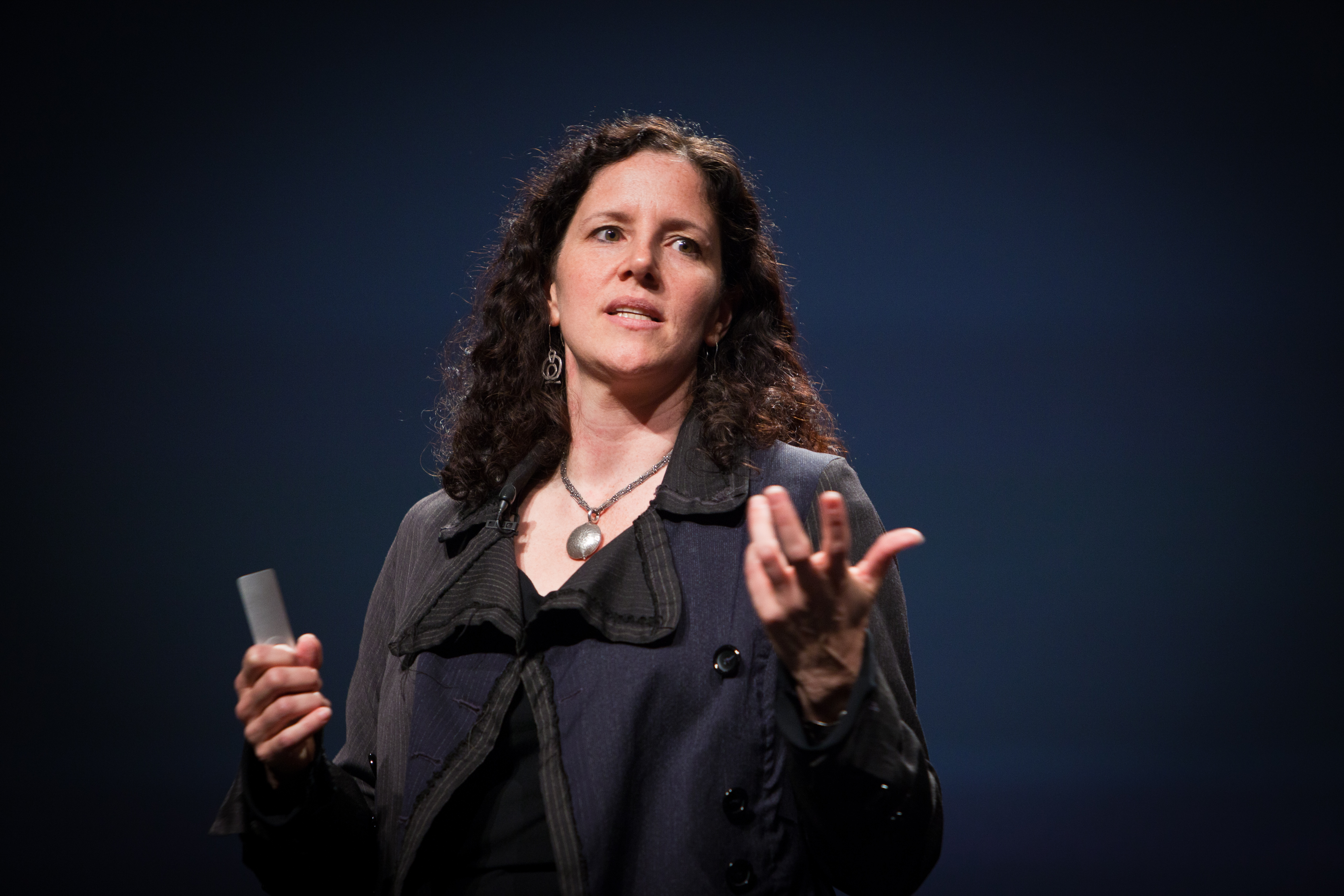
Poitras at PopTech 2010 in Camden, Maine

On August 22, 2012, in a forum of short documentaries produced by independent filmmakers, The New York Times published an "Op-doc" produced by Poitras entitled The Program. It was preliminary work that was to be included in a documentary planned for release as the final part of the trilogy. The documentary was based on interviews with William Binney, a 32-year veteran of the National Security Agency, who became a whistleblower and described the details of the Stellar Wind project that he helped to design. He stated that the program he worked on had been designed for foreign espionage, but was converted in 2001 to spying on citizens in the United States, prompting concerns by him and others that the actions were illegal and unconstitutional and that led to their disclosures.

The Program implied that a facility being built at Bluffdale, Utah is part of domestic surveillance, intended for storage of massive amounts of data collected from a broad range of communications that could be mined readily for intelligence without warrants. Poitras reported that on October 29, 2012 the United States Supreme Court would hear arguments regarding the constitutionality of the amendments to the Foreign Intelligence Surveillance Act that were used to authorize the creation of such facilities and justify such actions.

In 2012, Poitras took an active part in the three-month exposition of Whitney Biennial exhibition of contemporary American art.

=== Government surveillance ===
Poitras has been subject to monitoring by the U.S. government, which she speculates is because of a wire transfer she sent in 2006 to Riyadh al-Adhadh, the Iraqi medical doctor and Sunni political candidate who was the subject of her 2006 documentary My Country, My Country. After completing My Country, My Country, Poitras claims, "I've been placed on the Department of Homeland Security's (DHS) watch list" and have been notified by airport security "that my 'threat rating' was the highest the Department of Homeland Security assigns". She says her work has been hampered by constant harassment by border agents during more than three dozen border crossings into and out of the United States. She has been detained for hours and interrogated and agents have seized her computer, cell phone and reporters notes and not returned them for weeks. Once she was threatened with being refused entry back into the United States. In response to a Glenn Greenwald article on this issue, a group of film directors began a petition to protest against the government's actions towards her. In April 2012, Poitras was interviewed about surveillance on Democracy Now! and called elected leaders' behavior "shameful".

==== 2015 lawsuit over government harassment ====
In January 2014, Poitras filed a request under the Freedom of Information Act to learn the reason for being searched, detained and interrogated on multiple occasions. After receiving no response to her FOIA request, Poitras filed a lawsuit against the Department of Justice and other security agencies in July 2015. More than a year later, Poitras received 1,000+ pages of material from the federal government. The documents indicate that Poitras's repeated detainments were due to U.S. government suspicion that she had prior knowledge of a 2004 ambush on U.S. troops in Iraq, an allegation Poitras denies.

=== Global surveillance disclosures ===
Snowden speaking about the NSA leaks in Hong Kong; interview filmed by Poitras

In 2013, Poitras was one of the initial three journalists to meet Edward Snowden in Hong Kong and to receive copies of leaked NSA documents. Poitras and journalist Glenn Greenwald are the only two people with full archives of Snowden's leaked NSA documents, according to Greenwald.

Poitras helped to produce stories exposing previously secret U.S. intelligence activities, which earned her the 2013 Polk award and contributed to the 2014 Pulitzer Prize for Public Service awarded jointly to The Guardian and The Washington Post. She later worked with Jacob Appelbaum and writers and editors at Der Spiegel to cover disclosures about mass surveillance, particularly those relating to NSA activity in Germany. She later revealed in her documentary Risk that she had a brief romantic relationship with Appelbaum.

She filmed, edited, and produced Channel 4's alternative to the Royal Christmas Message by Queen Elizabeth II in 2013, the "Alternative Christmas Message", featuring Edward Snowden.

In October 2013, Poitras joined with reporters Greenwald and Jeremy Scahill to establish an on-line investigative journalism publishing venture funded by eBay billionaire Pierre Omidyar, which became First Look Media. Omidyar's "concern about press freedoms in the US and around the world" sparked the idea for the new media outlet. The first publication from that group, a digital magazine called The Intercept, launched on February 10, 2014. Poitras stood down from her editorial role in September 2016 to focus on Field of Vision, a First Look Media project focused on non-fiction films.

On March 21, 2014, Poitras joined Greenwald and Barton Gellman via Skype on a panel at the Sources and Secrets Conference to discuss the legal and professional threats to journalists covering national security surveillance and whistleblower stories, like that of Edward Snowden. Poitras was asked if she would hazard an entry into the United States and she responded that she planned to attend an April 11 event, regardless of the legal or professional threats posed by US authorities. Poitras and Greenwald returned to the US to receive their awards unimpeded.

In May 2014, Poitras was reunited with Snowden in Moscow along with Greenwald.

In September 2021, Yahoo! News reported that in 2017, after the publication of the Vault 7 files, "top intelligence officials lobbied the White House" to designate Poitras as an "information broker" to allow for more investigative tools against her, "potentially paving the way" for her prosecution. However, the White House rejected this idea. Poitras told Yahoo! News that such attempts were "bone-chilling and a threat to journalists worldwide."

=== 1971 documentary ===
1971 is a documentary film co-produced by Poitras. The film, about the 1971 Media, Pennsylvania raid of FBI offices, premiered at the Tribeca Film Festival on April 18, 2014.

=== Citizenfour (2014) ===
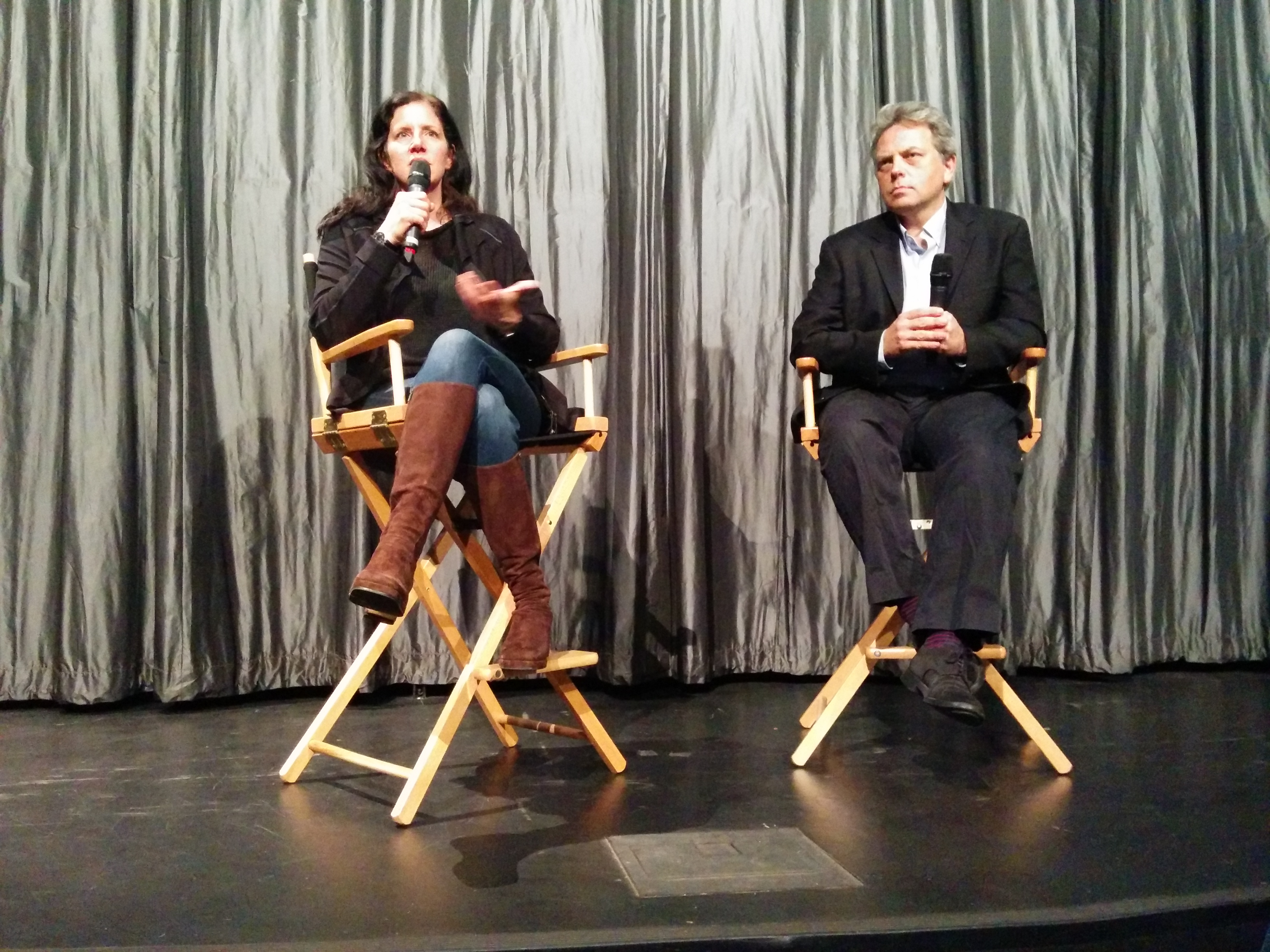
Poitras introducing her film Citizenfour at the IFC Center in NYC on opening night

Film trailer for Citizenfour

Citizenfour is a documentary about Edward Snowden, a former NSA contractor, who had leaked classified information about the agency's surveillance practices to the media after working in Geneva. Poitras was one of the journalists who worked with Snowden to publicize the information along with journalist Glenn Greenwald. The movie premiered on October 10, 2014, at New York Film Festival. In 2014, Poitras told the Associated Press she was editing the film in Berlin because she feared her source material would be seized by the government inside the U.S. Film executive Harvey Weinstein said Citizenfour had changed his opinion about Edward Snowden, describing the documentary as "one of the best movies, period."

In an interview with The Washington Post about Citizenfour shortly before the film's release, Poitras said that she considered herself to be the narrator of the film but made a choice not to be seen on camera:

"I come from a filmmaking tradition where I'm using the camera—it's my lens to express the filmmaking I do. In the same way that a writer uses their language, for me it's the images that tell the story ... the camera is my tool for documenting things, so I stay mostly behind it."

Citizenfour won the Academy Award for Best Documentary Feature of 2014.

Poitras is portrayed by actress Melissa Leo in the biographical drama film Snowden (2016), directed by Oliver Stone, and starring Joseph Gordon-Levitt as Snowden.

=== Astro Noise ===
Poitras's solo exhibition, Astro Noise, opened at the Whitney Museum of American Art in February 2016, portraying immersive environments with documentary footage, spatial interventions, original documents, and story structures to invite visitors to interact with the material gathered by Poitras "in strikingly intimate and direct ways", as per the Museum's page. The title of the installation, hints to the thermal radiation background disturbance that remained from the Big Bang, also being the name of an encrypted file that whistleblower Edward Snowden shared with Poitras in 2013, and which contained proof of the NSA's mass surveillance.

=== Risk (2016) ===
Poitras authored a documentary called Risk, on the life of Julian Assange. According to Variety, the film shows Assange is "willing to put everything on the line, risking imprisonment and worse to publish information he believes the public has a right to know".

Poitras and others described Assange's statements about women as "troubling". Assange alleges in the film that he is the victim of a radical feminist conspiracy over his being wanted for questioning on sexual assault allegations by the Swedish authorities. In the film, he argues that one of the women in question had potentially alternate motivation because she founded Gothenburg’s largest lesbian nightclub. According to Poitras, Assange disapproved of the film because it included scenes showing his "troubling relationship with women".

In May 2017, WikiLeaks' four lawyers publicly wrote an opinion piece for Newsweek stating that the film serves to undermine WikiLeaks at a time when the Trump administration announced that it intends to prosecute journalists, editors and associates of WikiLeaks. The lawyers also scrutinize the way in which Poitras changed the film after its premiere in 2016 as well as other critical aspects.

=== All the Beauty and the Bloodshed (2022) ===
All the Beauty and the Bloodshed is a 2022 documentary film which examines the life and career of photographer and activist Nan Goldin and her efforts to hold Purdue Pharma, owned by the Sackler family, accountable for the opioid epidemic. Goldin, a well known photographer whose work often documented the LGBT subcultures and the HIV/AIDS crisis, founded the advocacy group P.A.I.N. (Prescription Addiction Intervention Now) in 2017 after her own addiction to Oxycontin. P.A.I.N. specifically targets museums and other arts institutions to hold the art community accountable for its collaboration with the Sackler family and their well publicized financial support of the arts. The film was directed by Poitras. Poitras said, "Nan's art and vision has inspired my work for years, and has influenced generations of filmmakers."

The film premiered on September 3, 2022, at the 79th Venice International Film Festival, where it was awarded the Golden Lion making it the second documentary (following Sacro GRA in 2013) to win the top prize at Venice. It also will screen at the 2022 New York Film Festival, where it will be the festival's centerpiece film and the official poster will be designed by Goldin. The film's distributor, Neon, said that the theatrical release would coincide with a retrospective of Goldin's work at the Moderna Museet, set to open October 29, 2022. The documentary became a Peabody Award winner in June 2024 at the 84th awards ceremony.

=== Cover-Up (2025) ===
In 2025, Poitras co-directed and produced alongside Mark Obenhaus, Cover-Up focusing on the journalism of Seymour Hersh. It had its world premiere out of competition at the 82nd Venice International Film Festival and also screened as part of the Main Slate at the 2025 New York Film Festival.

== Selected awards and honours ==
- 2008: Creative Capital Award in Moving Image
- 2010: True Vision Award, True/False Film Festival, Columbia, MO
- 2010: Anonymous Was A Woman Award
- 2010: United States Artists (USA) Fellowship
- 2012: MacArthur Fellowship
- 2013: Electronic Frontier Foundation's Pioneer Award (with three other people)
- 2013: George Polk Award for National Security Reporting (with Glenn Greenwald and Ewen MacAskill)
- 2014: Ridenhour Truth-Telling Prize (with Edward Snowden)
- 2014: Pulitzer Prize for Public Service (awarded to The Washington Post and The Guardian for the NSA reporting on which she worked, along with Barton Gellman, Glenn Greenwald and Ewen MacAskill)
- 2014: Gerald Loeb Award for Large Newspapers (awarded to The Washington Post for five stories on the NSA)
- 2015: Academy Award for Best Documentary Feature (for Citizenfour)
- 2015: German Film Award for Best Documentary Film (for Citizenfour)
- 2022: Golden Lion, Venice Film Festival (for All the Beauty and the Bloodshed)
- 2022: Peabody Award (for All the Beauty and the Bloodshed)

== Selected filmography ==
- Exact Fantasy (1995)
- Flag Wars (2003)
- Oh Say Can You See... (2003)
- My Country, My Country (2006)
- The Oath (2010)
- Citizenfour (2014)
- Risk (2016)
- The Year of the Everlasting Storm (2021)
- Terror Contagion (2021)
- All the Beauty and the Bloodshed (2022)
- Cover-Up (2025)
- They're Here (2026)
