= Year at Danger =

- Directed by: Steve Metze, Don Swaynos
- Produced by: Steve Metze
- Starring: Steve Metze
- Edited by: Don Swaynos
- Music by: George Oldziey
- Release date: 2007
- Running time: 93 minutes
- Country: United States
- Languages: English; Arabic

Year at Danger is a 2007 independent documentary film.

Nine days after his marriage, Steve Metze found out that he was being deployed as part of Operation Iraqi Freedom. Metze, a West Point graduate, Desert Storm veteran, and documentary filmmaker, decided to pack a camera and document his year in Iraq. The film consists of footage shot by Metze during his deployment to Iraq and was edited by Don Swaynos.

The film won the Grand Jury Award at the 2008 DeadCENTER Film Festival and was an Official Selection of the 2007 Austin Film Festival and the 2008 GI Film Festival.

== Reception ==
The film was called by The Austin Chronicle an "immensely powerful documentary". "In this day of sanitized media coverage and “pool” journalism, you’re probably never going to see a chronicle this raw and uncensored.", wrote the Houston Press.
