= The Unreturned =

- Directed by: Nathan Fisher
- Produced by: Nathan Fisher; Matthew Bowlby; Kays Mejri
- Cinematography: Nathan Fisher
- Edited by: Nathan Fisher
- Music by: Zaydoon Triko; Evil Science; Bejesus
- Distributed by: Sideways Film
- Release date: April 25, 2010 (M-SPIFF)
- Running time: 75 minutes
- Countries: Canada; United States
- Languages: Arabic and English with English subtitles

The Unreturned is a 2010 documentary film by Nathan Fisher. The film tells the story of five middle-class Iraqi refugees caught in an absurdist purgatory of endless bureaucracy, dwindling life savings, and forced idleness. The Unreturned was shot in verité style in Syria and Jordan, with unscripted narration by the refugees in the film. These Iraqis come from diverse ethnic and religious backgrounds.

The film's world premiere was April 25, 2010 at the Minneapolis-St. Paul International Film Festival, where it was awarded "Best of Festival" honors. The film is also an official selection at the 2010 Marfa Film Festival and the 2010 Human Rights Watch International Film Festival in New York.
