= Reserved to Fight =

Reserved to Fight is a documentary film that follows four Marine Reservists of Fox Company 2nd Battalion, 23rd Marines for four years. It documents their deployment, their return home from Iraq combat in May 2003, and their reintegration into civilian life. Their battalion was the first reserve unit activated for Operation Iraqi Freedom. They were also the first to return home. The film deals with the lives of the friends as they come to grips with the harsh reality of reassuming civilian life. Each has a different experience, some dealing with varying degrees of posttraumatic stress disorder. The film is notable for following the first reservists deployed in the Iraq War, and therefore the first of these Marines to begin the reintegration process.

Reserved to Fight aired on PBS nationwide in 2008, and has been broadcast in 8 countries and several film festivals. It was screened in various venues across the country: in individual military mental health symposiums, a suicide prevention treatment program by the Montana National Guard, and the University of Utah's soldier integration program.

Reserved To Fight was directed and produced by Chantelle Squires of MirrorLake Films. Manju Varghese and Coby Broyles also served as producers, with Sterling Van Wagenen as the executive producer.

== Subject Synopses ==
The subjects of the film were Lance Corporal Earl Simmons, Sergeant Christopher J. Nibley, Corporal Matthew Jemmett and Lance Corporal Mark A. Patterson.

Taking anti-war media personally, Mark Patterson returns home ready to speak out against those who oppose the war. Unwilling to admit the war has affected him, his life becomes consumed with trying to convince his peers that his actions in Iraq were correct. Surprisingly, when his long-time girlfriend and emotional support breaks up with him, severe depression forces him to confront his past, drastically reshaping his future.

Matt Jemmett is immediately diagnosed with posttraumatic stress disorder (PTSD) after his return home, but when traditional therapy doesn't work, he decides he needs isolation. He moves into his car and takes a job in a remote desert location working with at-risk youth.

Raised in a strict religious society, Earl Simmons' abuse of alcohol to fight traumatic memories of the war leaves him unable to fulfill a two-year-long church mission. After returning to his community for a second time, shame and seclusion force him to face his demons.

Chris Nibley returns home just wishing to be normal — to start a family and have a lot of kids. However, he finds himself depressed and soon realizes that he does not fit into this concept of "normal". As a result, he is left feeling isolated and without direction. Attempts to find happiness leaves him hopeless of ever finding his sense of purpose in America again. Nibley decides to volunteer for a second tour in Iraq, knowing, and maybe hoping, he will die.

=== Quotes ===
- "When you're faced with dying, getting shot at, your life is over- and everyone else is watching American Idol, you feel very alone." - Sergeant Christopher J. Nibley
- "I was trained to fight. I was well trained to fight, and I was good at it. We were all good at it, but nobody sat me down and trained me how to cope with returning to society after I had been in war. Nobody." - Lance Corporal Mark A. Patterson
