= Kill the Messenger (2006 film) =

- French: Une Femme à Abattre
- Directed by: Mathieu Verboud; Jean-Robert Viallet
- Country of origin: France
- Original languages: English; French

Production
- Producer: Bruno Nahon
- Running time: 84 minutes
- Production company: Zadig productions

Original release
- Release: 2006

Kill The Messenger (French: Une Femme à Abattre) is a 2006 French documentary film about Sibel Edmonds. An English version was produced in 2007 by SBS Australia.

The documentary focuses on both Ms. Edmonds's personal struggle to expose the criminality that she uncovered while at the FBI, and also the Sept. 11, 2001 tied 'secret' itself - the network of nuclear black-market, narcotics and illegal arms trafficking activities. Interviewees include David Rose, Philip Giraldi, Daniel Ellsberg, Coleen Rowley and Russell Tice.

== U.S. premiere ==
On September 9, 2009, the film had its U.S. premiere at the 9/11 Film Festival at the Grand Lake Theater in Oakland, California.
