= Baghdad or Bust =

- Directed by: Matt Frame
- Written by: Matt Frame
- Produced by: Paul Gordon
- Cinematography: Adam Bowick; Paul Gordon
- Edited by: Matt Frame
- Music by: Hans Schnabel
- Distributed by: Canadian Broadcasting Corporation
- Release date: 2004
- Running time: 90 minutes
- Country: Canada
- Language: English

Baghdad or Bust is a budget documentary filmed in Canada, Turkey, Kurdistan, Iraq, Israel, Palestine, Jordan, and Washington, D.C. During the US-led 2003 invasion of Iraq, Baghdad or Bust was an official selection at several film festivals including Hot Docs in Canada and the Bergen Film Festival in Norway. It received the top award for Best Documentary at the 2003 Whistler Film Festival. Baghdad or Bust was described as a funny, poignant take on the war in Iraq, chronicling the misadventures of Gordon and two Yellowknifers as they meander through the Middle East during the U.S. invasion, interviewing such stranger-than-fictional characters as a piratical Kurd and a Turkish rug-monger with a cat named Bush. Armed with a microphone, director Matt Frame's uses his self-effacing and sardonic wit in parodying Michael Moore's filmmaking style. "

== See also ==
- List of Iraq War documentaries
