= Linwood, New Jersey =

City in Atlantic County, New Jersey, US

- City
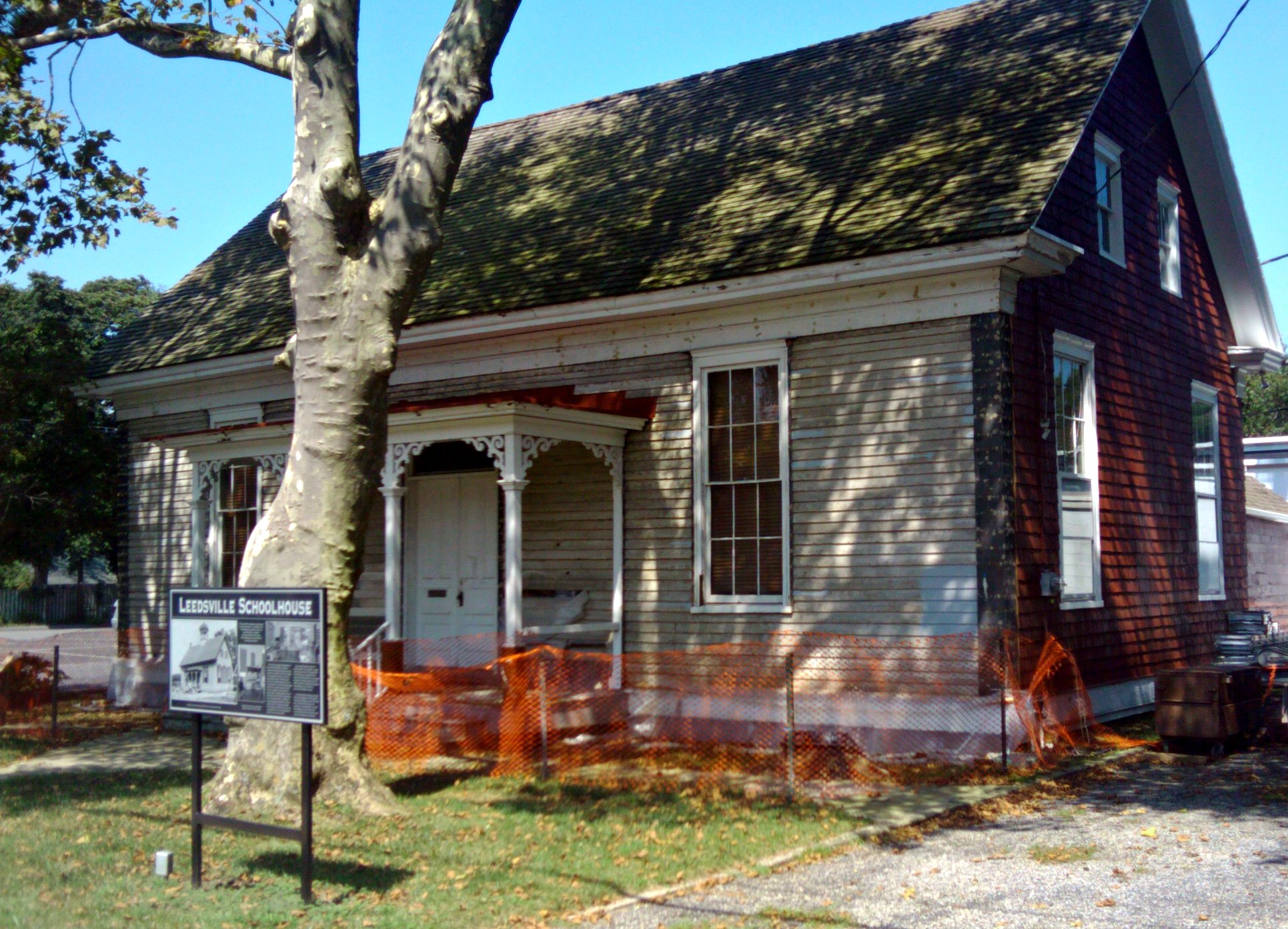
- Linwood Borough School

- Seal

- Location of Linwood in Atlantic County highlighted in red (left). Inset map: Location of Atlantic County in New Jersey highlighted in orange (right).

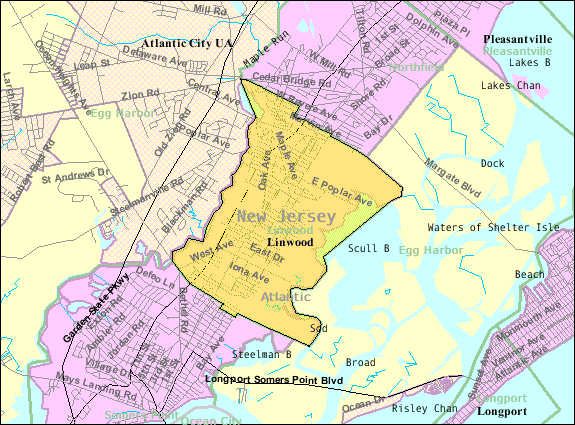
- Census Bureau map of Linwood, New Jersey

- Location in Atlantic County Location in New Jersey Location in the United States
- Coordinates: 39.343718°N 74.57105°W
- Country: United States
- State: New Jersey
- County: Atlantic
- Incorporated: February 20, 1889 (as borough)
- Reincorporated: April 27, 1931 (as city)

Government
  - Type: City
  - Body: City Council
  - Mayor: Darren H. Matik (R, term ends December 31, 2027)
  - Administrator / Municipal clerk: Leigh Ann Napoli

Area
  - Total: 4.21 sq mi (10.91 km^{2})
  - Land: 3.81 sq mi (9.87 km^{2})
  - Water: 0.40 sq mi (1.04 km^{2}) 9.55%
  - Rank: 290th of 565 in state 19th of 23 in county
- Elevation: 30 ft (9.1 m)

Population (2020)
  - Total: 6,971
  - Estimate (2023): 6,957
  - Rank: 322nd of 565 in state 13th of 23 in county
  - Density: 1,829.2/sq mi (706.3/km^{2})
  - Rank: 306th of 565 in state 8th of 23 in county
- Time zone: UTC−05:00 (Eastern (EST))
  - Summer (DST): UTC−04:00 (Eastern (EDT))
- ZIP Code: 08221
- Area code: 609
- FIPS code: 3400140530
- GNIS feature ID: 0885280
- Website: www.linwoodcity.org

Linwood is a city in Atlantic County, in the U.S. state of New Jersey. As of the 2020 United States census, the city's population was 6,971, a decrease of 121 (−1.7%) from the 2010 census count of 7,092, which in turn reflected a decline of 80 (−1.1%) from the 7,172 counted in the 2000 census.

Linwood was originally incorporated as a borough by an act of the New Jersey Legislature on February 20, 1889, from portions of Egg Harbor Township, based on the results of a referendum held the previous day. Linwood was reincorporated as a city on April 27, 1931. The area had been called Leedsville until 1880, when a post office was being established. The United States Postal Service insisted that the name had to be changed as it conflicted with an existing post office elsewhere in the state. Among the names proposed and considered by local residents were "Brinola", "Geneva", "Pearville" and "Viola", with "Linwood" ultimately chosen.

Geographically, the city, and all of Atlantic County, is part of the South Jersey region of the state and of the Atlantic City-Hammonton metropolitan statistical area, which in turn is included in the Philadelphia metropolitan area.

== Geography ==
According to the United States Census Bureau, the city had a total area of 4.21 square miles (10.91 km^{2}), including 3.81 square miles (9.87 km^{2}) of land and 0.40 square miles (1.04 km^{2}) of water (9.55%).

The city is located about 9 miles (14 km) west of Atlantic City. It borders the municipalities of Egg Harbor Township, Northfield and Somers Point.

Unincorporated communities, localities and place names located partially or completely within the city include Bellhaven and Seaview.

== Demographics ==
Historical population
Census	Pop.	Note	%±
1890	536		—
1900	495		−7.6%
1910	602		21.6%
1920	638		6.0%
1930	1,514		137.3%
1940	1,479		−2.3%
1950	1,925		30.2%
1960	3,847		99.8%
1970	6,159		60.1%
1980	6,144		−0.2%
1990	6,866		11.8%
2000	7,172		4.5%
2010	7,092		−1.1%
2020	6,971		−1.7%
2023 (est.)	6,957		−0.2%
Population sources: 1890–2000 1890–1920; 1890–1910 1910–1930; 1940–2000 2000; 2010 2020

The median house value in 2005 was $300,200.

=== 2020 census ===
As of the 2020 census, Linwood had a population of 6,971. The median age was 46.4 years. 22.6% of residents were under the age of 18 and 22.1% of residents were 65 years of age or older. For every 100 females there were 94.9 males, and for every 100 females age 18 and over there were 90.8 males age 18 and over.

98.9% of residents lived in urban areas, while 1.1% lived in rural areas.

There were 2,643 households in Linwood, of which 32.6% had children under the age of 18 living in them. Of all households, 57.4% were married-couple households, 13.5% were households with a male householder and no spouse or partner present, and 24.6% were households with a female householder and no spouse or partner present. About 22.7% of all households were made up of individuals and 13.5% had someone living alone who was 65 years of age or older.

There were 2,813 housing units, of which 6.0% were vacant. The homeowner vacancy rate was 1.5% and the rental vacancy rate was 1.2%.

Racial composition as of the 2020 census
Race	Number	Percent
White	5,965	85.6%
Black or African American	94	1.3%
American Indian and Alaska Native	12	0.2%
Asian	343	4.9%
Native Hawaiian and Other Pacific Islander	2	0.0%
Some other race	97	1.4%
Two or more races	458	6.6%
Hispanic or Latino (of any race)	362	5.2%

=== 2010 census ===
The 2010 United States census counted 7,092 people, 2,653 households, and 1,958 families in the city. The population density was 1,834.9 per square mile (708.5/km^{2}). There were 2,798 housing units at an average density of 723.9 per square mile (279.5/km^{2}). The racial makeup was 93.18% (6,608) White, 0.97% (69) Black or African American, 0.07% (5) Native American, 3.79% (269) Asian, 0.00% (0) Pacific Islander, 0.54% (38) from other races, and 1.45% (103) from two or more races. Hispanic or Latino of any race were 2.96% (210) of the population.

Of the 2,653 households, 33.7% had children under the age of 18; 60.2% were married couples living together; 10.1% had a female householder with no husband present and 26.2% were non-families. Of all households, 23.0% were made up of individuals and 14.4% had someone living alone who was 65 years of age or older. The average household size was 2.62 and the average family size was 3.10.

24.9% of the population were under the age of 18, 6.0% from 18 to 24, 18.0% from 25 to 44, 33.1% from 45 to 64, and 18.1% who were 65 years of age or older. The median age was 45.7 years. For every 100 females, the population had 90.1 males. For every 100 females ages 18 and older there were 85.1 males.

The Census Bureau's 2006–2010 American Community Survey showed that (in 2010 inflation-adjusted dollars) median household income was $80,518 (with a margin of error of +/− $8,965) and the median family income was $103,529 (+/− $11,162). Males had a median income of $90,125 (+/− $16,766) versus $50,125 (+/− $5,378) for females. The per capita income for the city was $47,501 (+/− $5,093). About 2.1% of families and 2.8% of the population were below the poverty line, including 3.2% of those under age 18 and 7.9% of those age 65 or over.

=== 2000 census ===
As of the 2000 United States census there were 7,172 people, 2,647 households, and 1,966 families residing in the city. The population density was 1,873.5 inhabitants per square mile (723.4/km^{2}). There were 2,751 housing units at an average density of 718.6 per square mile (277.5/km^{2}). The racial makeup of the city was 95.20% White, 1.06% African American, 0.11% Native American, 2.41% Asian, 0.22% from other races, and 0.99% from two or more races. Hispanic or Latino of any race were 1.81% of the population.

There were 2,647 households, out of which 35.1% had children under the age of 18 living with them, 63.4% were married couples living together, 8.5% had a female householder with no husband present, and 25.7% were non-families. 22.3% of all households were made up of individuals, and 12.9% had someone living alone who was 65 years of age or older. The average household size was 2.65 and the average family size was 3.13.

In the city the population was spread out, with 26.2% under the age of 18, 3.8% from 18 to 24, 24.3% from 25 to 44, 27.0% from 45 to 64, and 18.8% who were 65 years of age or older. The median age was 43 years. For every 100 females, there were 87.3 males. For every 100 females age 18 and over, there were 83.6 males.

The median income for a household in the city was $60,000, and the median income for a family was $71,415. Males had a median income of $51,614 versus $31,627 for females. The per capita income for the city was $32,159. About 3.8% of families and 3.9% of the population were below the poverty line, including 2.1% of those under age 18 and 7.5% of those age 65 or over.

== Government ==
=== Local government ===
Linwood operates under the City form of New Jersey municipal government, one of 15 (of the 564) municipalities statewide that use this form. The governing body is comprised of a Mayor and a seven-member City Council who are chosen in partisan balloting held as part of the November general election. The mayor is elected at-large for a four-year term of office. On the city council, six council members are elected from the city's two wards for three-year terms on a staggered basis with two ward seats coming up for election each year, and one at-large council member is elected for a three-year term. The council exercises the legislative power of the city by adopting ordinances and resolutions. In addition, the council is responsible for the approval of the city budget, the establishment of financial controls and setting of all salaries of elected and appointed officers and employees. An administrator is charged with directing the day-to-day activities of city government.

As of 2023, the Mayor of the City of Linwood is Republican Darren H. Matik, whose term of office ends December 31, 2023. Members of the City Council are Blair Albright (R, 2024, Ward 2), June Byrnes (R, 2024; Ward 1), Stacy DeDomenicis (R, 2025; Ward 1), Eric Ford (R, 2023; Ward 1), Matthew B. Levinson (R, 2024, At Large), Todd Michael (R, 2025, Ward 2) and Adam M. Walcoff (R, 2023; Ward 2 - appointed to fill an unexpired term).

In December 2022, the city council appointed Adam M. Walcoff To fill the seat expiring in December 2023 that had been held by Ralph A. Paolone until he resigned from office.

Todd Michael was appointed in June 2021 to fill the Ward 2 seat expiring in December 2022 that had been hele by Brian Heun until he resigned from office the previous March. Michael served on an interim basis until he won election for the balance of the term of office in November 2021.

In January 2020, Matthew B. Levinson was appointed to fill the at-large city council seat expiring in December 2020 that was vacated by Darren H. Matik when he took office as mayor.

In May 2016, Eric Ford was selected from three candidates nominated by the Republican municipal committee to fill the Ward 1 seat expiring in December 2017 that became vacant following the resignation of Timothy Tighe.

Darren Matik was named in August 2012 to fill the vacant at-large seat that had been held by Matthew Levinson, who resigned the previous month. Todd Gordon was appointed in January 2013 to fill the seat of Alex Marino, who had resigned following his taking office on the Atlantic County Board of Chosen Freeholders. Brian Heun was appointed in February 2014 to fill the unexpired term of Donna Taylor.

=== Federal, state and county representation ===
Linwood is located in the 2nd Congressional District and is part of New Jersey's 2nd state legislative district.

For the 119th United States Congress, New Jersey's 2nd congressional district is represented by Jeff Van Drew (R, Dennis Township). New Jersey is represented in the United States Senate by Democrats Cory Booker (Newark, term ends 2027) and Andy Kim (Moorestown, term ends 2031).

For the 2026–2027 session, the 2nd legislative district of the New Jersey Legislature is represented in the New Jersey Senate by Vincent J. Polistina (R, Egg Harbor Township) and in the General Assembly by Don Guardian (R, Atlantic City) and Maureen Rowan (D, Atlantic City).

Atlantic County is governed by a directly elected county executive and a nine-member Board of County Commissioners, responsible for legislation. The executive serves a four-year term and the commissioners are elected to staggered three-year terms, of which four are elected from the county on an at-large basis and five of the commissioners represent equally populated districts. As of 2025, Atlantic County's Executive is Dennis Levinson (R, Northfield), whose term of office ends December 31, 2027. Members of the Board of County Commissioners are:

Ernest D. Coursey (D, District 1-- Atlantic City, Egg Harbor Township (part), Longport, Margate City, and Ventnor City; 2025, Atlantic City), Chair Maureen Kern (R, District 2-- Egg Harbor Township (part), Linwood, Northfield, Somers Point and Pleasantville; 2027, Somers Point), Andrew Parker III (R, District 3-- Egg Harbor Township (part) and Hamilton Township (part); 2026, Egg Harbor Township), Richard R. Dase (R, District 4, including Brigantine, Galloway Township, Egg Harbor Township (part), and Port Republic; 2025, Galloway Township), Vice Chair James A. Bertino (R, District 5-- Buena, Buena Vista Township, Corbin City, Egg Harbor City, Estell Manor, Folsom, Hamilton Township (part), Hammonton, Mullica Township and Weymouth Township; 2027, Hammonton), June Byrnes (R, At-Large; 2026, Linwood), Michael Ruffu (R, At-Large; Margate, 2027) Amy L. Gatto (R, At-large; 2025, Hamilton Township) and John W. Risley (R, At-Large; 2026, Egg Harbor Township)

Atlantic County's constitutional officers are: Clerk Joesph J. Giralo (R, 2026, Hammonton), Sheriff Joe O'Donoghue (R, 2026, Egg Harbor Township) and Surrogate James Curcio (R, 2025, Hammonton).

=== Politics ===
As of March 2011, there were a total of 5,197 registered voters in Linwood City, of which 1,120 (21.6% vs. 30.5% countywide) were registered as Democrats, 1,894 (36.4% vs. 25.2%) were registered as Republicans and 2,181 (42.0% vs. 44.3%) were registered as Unaffiliated. There were 2 voters registered as either Libertarians or Greens. Among the city's 2010 Census population, 73.3% (vs. 58.8% in Atlantic County) were registered to vote, including 97.5% of those ages 18 and over (vs. 76.6% countywide).

Gubernatorial election results for Linwood
Year	Republican		Democratic		Third party(ies)	
Year	No.	%	No.	%	No.	%
2025	1,830	53.15%	1,602	46.53%	11	0.32%
2021	1,775	58.66%	1,235	40.81%	16	0.53%
2017	1,169	50.87%	1,078	46.91%	51	2.22%
2013	1,800	71.83%	679	27.09%	27	1.08%
2009	1,536	55.71%	1,017	36.89%	204	7.40%
2005	1,405	53.34%	1,156	43.89%	73	2.77%

In the 2012 presidential election, Republican Mitt Romney received 2,190 votes (57.0% vs. 41.1% countywide), ahead of Democrat Barack Obama with 1,592 votes (41.4% vs. 57.9%) and other candidates with 39 votes (1.0% vs. 0.9%), among the 3,842 ballots cast by the city's 5,408 registered voters, for a turnout of 71.0% (vs. 65.8% in Atlantic County). In the 2008 presidential election, Republican John McCain received 2,190 votes (53.0% vs. 41.6% countywide), ahead of Democrat Barack Obama with 1,851 votes (44.8% vs. 56.5%) and other candidates with 51 votes (1.2% vs. 1.1%), among the 4,131 ballots cast by the city's 5,476 registered voters, for a turnout of 75.4% (vs. 68.1% in Atlantic County). In the 2004 presidential election, Republican George W. Bush received 2,254 votes (56.3% vs. 46.2% countywide), ahead of Democrat John Kerry with 1,674 votes (41.8% vs. 52.0%) and other candidates with 40 votes (1.0% vs. 0.8%), among the 4,004 ballots cast by the city's 5,011 registered voters, for a turnout of 79.9% (vs. 69.8% in the whole county).

Presidential elections results
Year	Republican	Democratic	Third Parties
2024	53.2% 2,326	45.0% 1,971	1.8% 57
2020	51.2% 2,366	47.2% 2,179	1.6% 74
2016	52.9% 1,847	42.0% 1,466	5.1% 177
2012	57.0% 2,190	41.4% 1,592	1.0% 39
2008	53.0% 2,190	44.8% 1,851	1.2% 51
2004	56.3% 2,254	41.8% 1,674	1.0% 40

In the 2013 gubernatorial election, Republican Chris Christie received 1,800 votes (69.9% vs. 60.0% countywide), ahead of Democrat Barbara Buono with 679 votes (26.4% vs. 34.9%) and other candidates with 27 votes (1.0% vs. 1.3%), among the 2,576 ballots cast by the city's 5,541 registered voters, yielding a 46.5% turnout (vs. 41.5% in the county). In the 2009 gubernatorial election, Republican Chris Christie received 1,536 votes (55.4% vs. 47.7% countywide), ahead of Democrat Jon Corzine with 1,017 votes (36.7% vs. 44.5%), Independent Chris Daggett with 174 votes (6.3% vs. 4.8%) and other candidates with 30 votes (1.1% vs. 1.2%), among the 2,774 ballots cast by the city's 5,260 registered voters, yielding a 52.7% turnout (vs. 44.9% in the county).

United States Senate election results for Linwood1
Year	Republican		Democratic		Third party(ies)	
Year	No.	%	No.	%	No.	%
2024	2,308	54.33%	1,883	44.33%	57	1.34%
2018	1,742	60.24%	1,073	37.10%	77	2.66%
2012	1,986	55.11%	1,568	43.51%	50	1.39%
2006	1,450	53.64%	1,208	44.69%	45	1.66%

United States Senate election results for Linwood2
Year	Republican		Democratic		Third party(ies)	
Year	No.	%	No.	%	No.	%
2020	2,369	52.52%	2,084	46.20%	58	1.29%
2014	1,318	56.91%	961	41.49%	37	1.60%
2013	853	58.79%	587	40.45%	11	0.76%
2008	2,101	54.35%	1,719	44.46%	46	1.19%

== Historic district ==
- Linwood Historic District
- U.S. National Register of Historic Places
- U.S. Historic district
- New Jersey Register of Historic Places
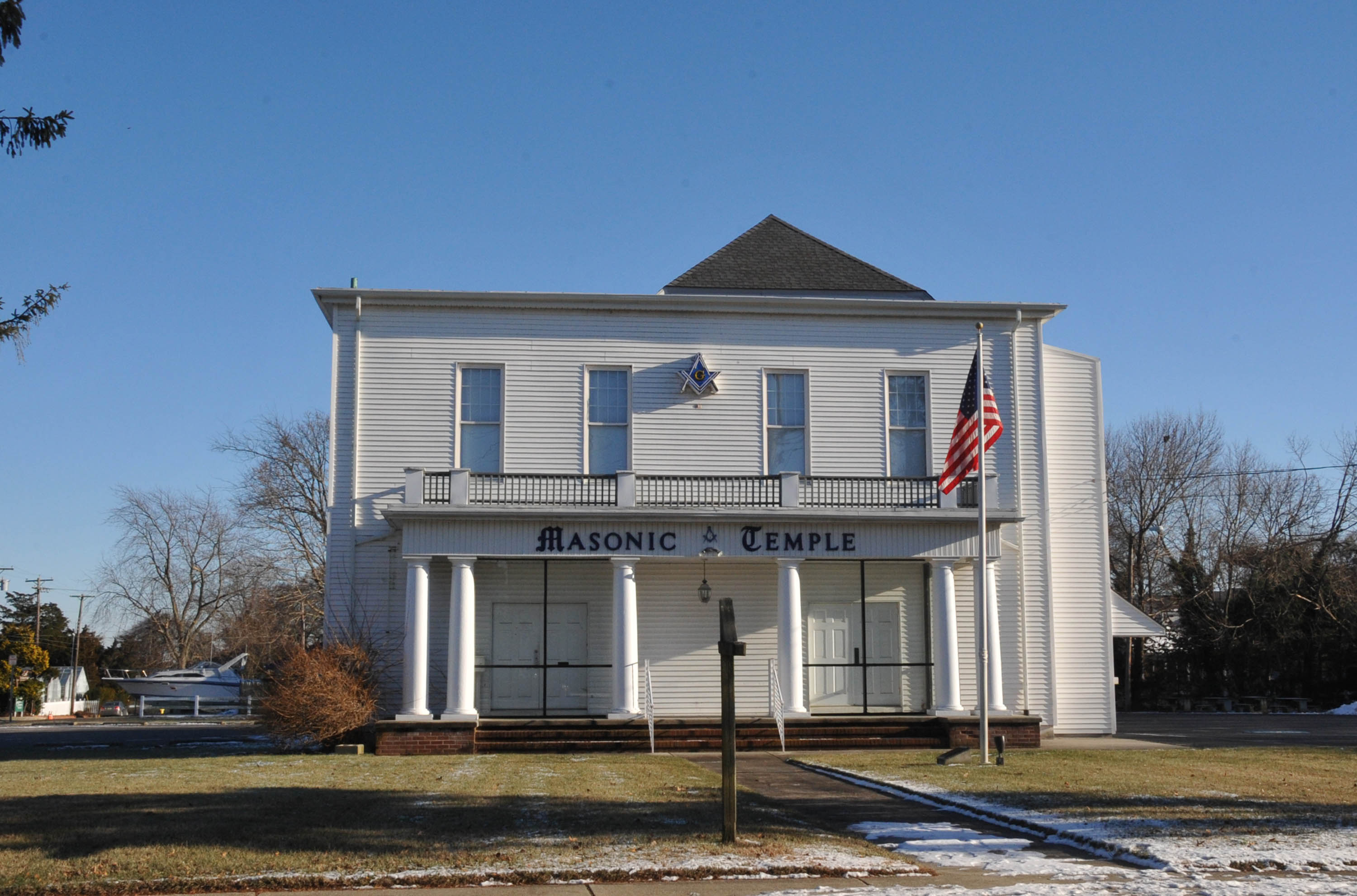
- Masonic Temple
- Location: Maple and Poplar avenues, and Shore Road
- Area: 111 acres (45 ha)
- Architectural style: Early Republic, Bungalow/craftsman, Gothic
- NRHP reference No.: 89000800
- NJRHP No.: 347

Significant dates
- Added to NRHP: July 13, 1989
- Designated NJRHP: April 27, 1989

The Linwood Historic District is a 111-acre (45 ha) historic district within the city along Maple and Poplar avenues, and Shore Road. It was added to the National Register of Historic Places on July 13, 1989 for its significance in architecture and social history. The district includes 129 contributing buildings and three contributing sites.

The Masonic Temple was built c. 1890 and features Doric columns. The district also includes Linwood Borough School No. 1, listed individually on the NRHP in 1984.

== Education ==
=== Public schools ===
Students in pre-kindergarten through eighth grade are served by the Linwood Public Schools. As of the 2020–21 school year, the district, comprised of two schools, had an enrollment of 809 students and 71.0 classroom teachers (on an FTE basis), for a student–teacher ratio of 11.4:1. Schools in the district (with 2020–21 enrollment data from the National Center for Education Statistics) are Seaview Elementary School with 429 students in grades Pre-K–4 and Belhaven Middle School with 378 students in grades 5–8.

Students in public school for ninth through twelfth grades attend Mainland Regional High School, which also serves students from Northfield and Somers Point. The high school is located in Linwood. For the 1997–98 school year, Mainland Regional High School was recognized by the United States Department of Education as a National Blue Ribbon School. As of the 2020–21 school year, the high school had an enrollment of 1,239 students and 108.0 classroom teachers (on an FTE basis), for a student–teacher ratio of 11.5:1.

Borough public school students are also eligible to attend the Atlantic County Institute of Technology in the Mays Landing section of Hamilton Township or the Charter-Tech High School for the Performing Arts, located in Somers Point.

=== Private school ===
The Gospel of Grace Christian School serves students from pre-kindergarten through sixth grade.

=== Linwood Public Library ===
The Linwood Public Library was established in 1948.

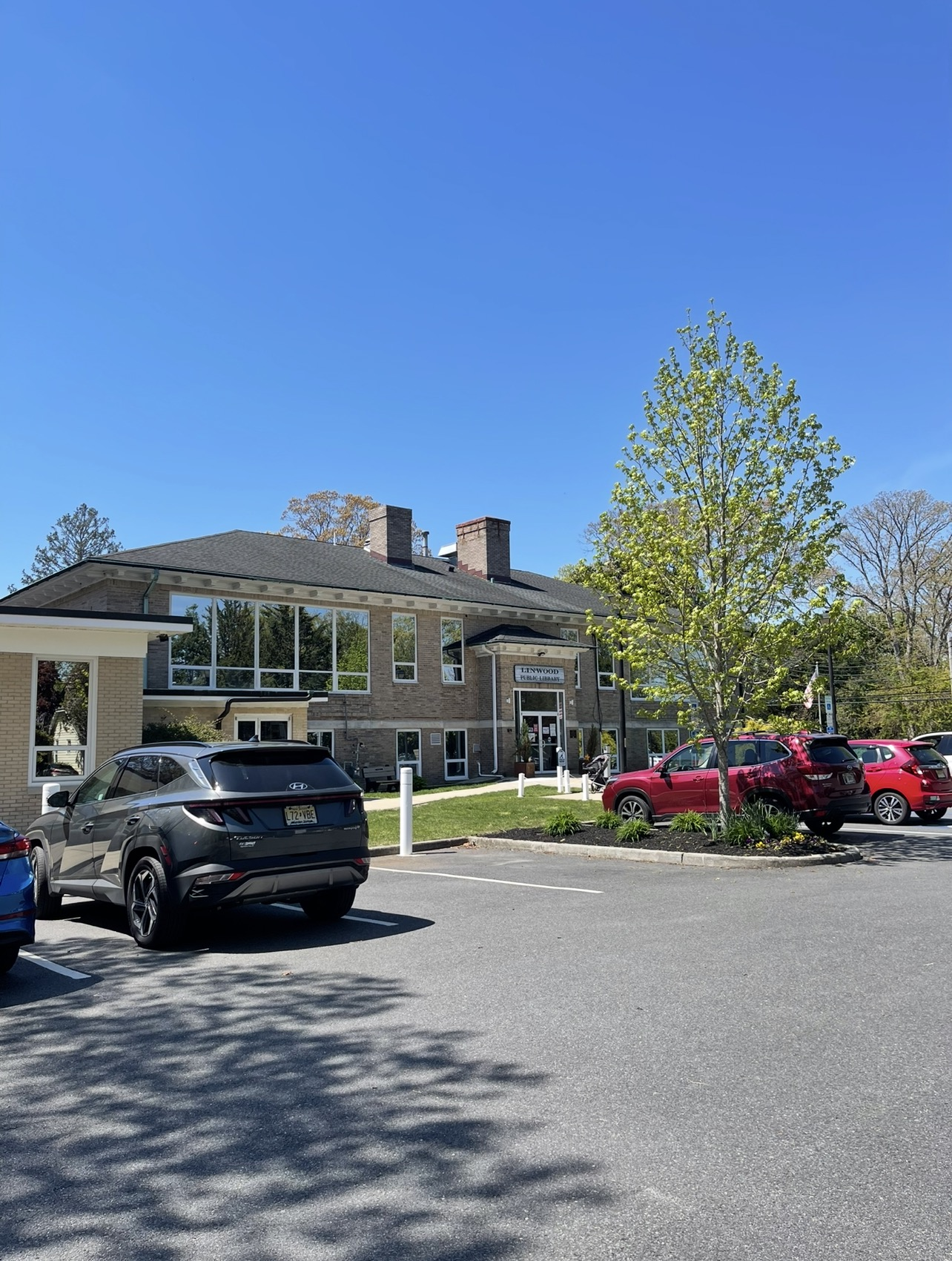
Public Library in Linwood, New Jersey; Front Entrance - Side View

== Transportation ==
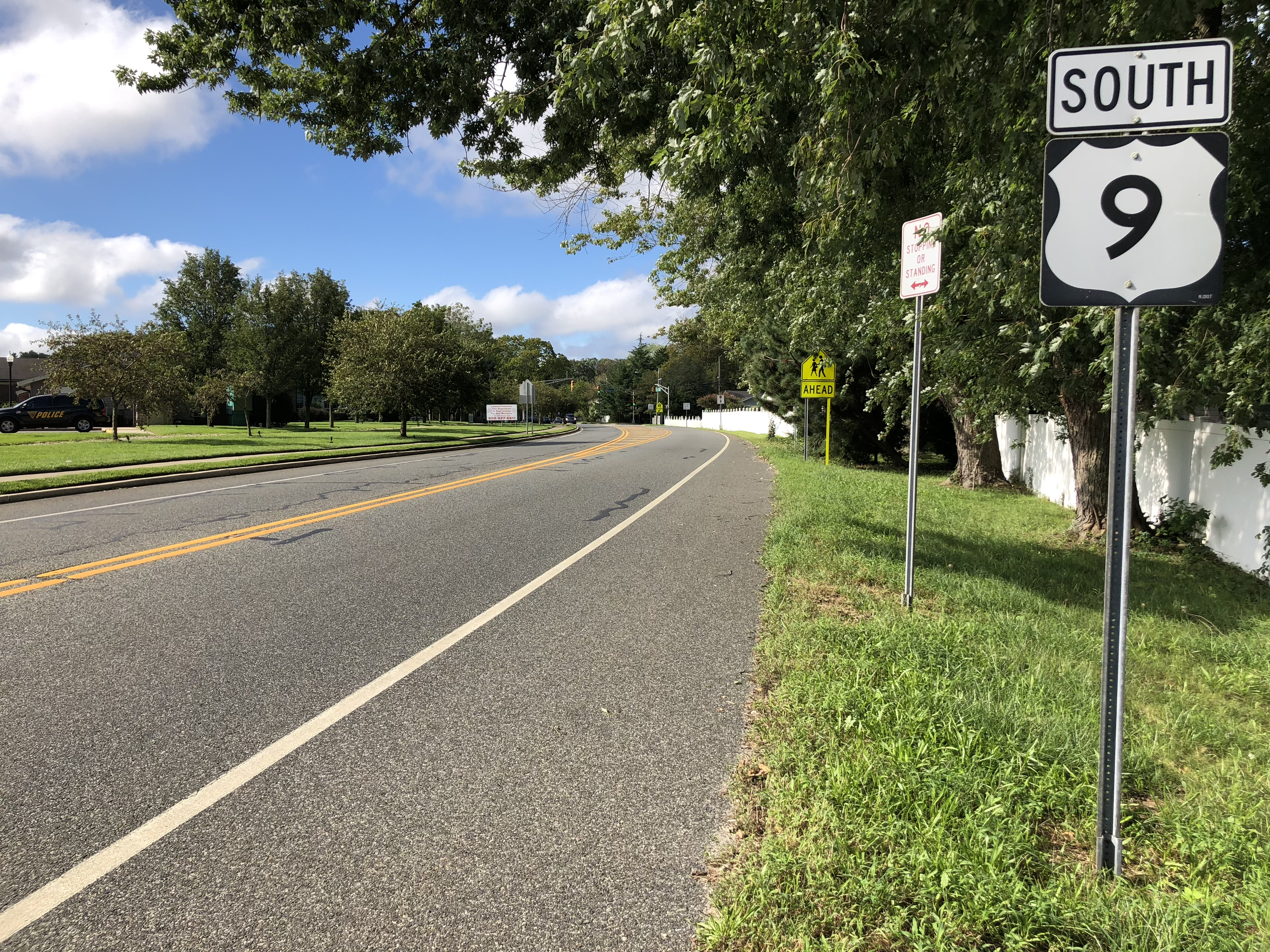
U.S. Route 9 southbound in Linwood

=== Roads and highways ===
As of May 2010, the city had a total of 42.57 miles (68.51 km) of roadways, of which 36.93 miles (59.43 km) were maintained by the municipality, 3.15 miles (5.07 km) by Atlantic County and 2.49 miles (4.01 km) by the New Jersey Department of Transportation.

U.S. Route 9 is the main highway directly serving Linwood, running nearly 2.5 miles (4.0 km) south into Somers Point and north into Northfield. Several major highways are accessible just outside the city, including the Garden State Parkway and the Atlantic City Expressway. These major highways provide connections to New York City, Philadelphia and Cape May.

=== Public transportation ===
NJ Transit offers bus transportation to and from Ocean City and Atlantic City on the 507 and 509 routes.

Atlantic City International Airport, approximately 20 miles (32 km) away, provides both commuter and regular air travel to major eastern cities and beyond.

== Community services ==
- There are only three traffic lights in the city: Central and Oak, Central and New Road, and Poplar and New Road. An additional traffic light lies on the border with Somers Point, at Ocean Heights and New Road.
- There are at least three points of access to the waters surrounding Linwood. The west end of Hamilton Avenue abuts Patcong Creek, allowing the launching of canoes or kayaks (and possibly trailered boats). An unnamed dirt road (Poplar Docks) just to the east of the Linwood Country Club ends several hundred yards into the marshes, and it may allow launching of trailered boats at low tide (the end of the road tends to submerge at high tide). The eastern end of Seaview Avenue is a better-constructed dirt road that ends at a dock (known as "Seaview Docks" to locals) on Sod Thorofare, and is suitable for trailered boats. A parking permit is required at the Hamilton Avenue and Seaview Avenue sites. Permits are valid for the entire calendar year, though their purchase price varies with time of acquisition:
  - January 1 through March 31: $20 per permit, except for senior citizens 65 years or older, where the fee will be $5 per permit.
  - Permits purchased subsequent to March 31 and prior to Labor Day will be available at a cost of $50 per permit.
  - Permits purchased from Labor Day through December 31 will be available at a cost of $20 per permit.

Up to 450 permits per year are issued, and they can be purchased at the office of the City Clerk.

- On May 14, 2003, the City Council approved the auction of up to two licenses, citywide, for restaurant service of alcoholic beverages. Package-good sales are not permitted anywhere in the city. This was the first revision to the alcohol-sales-related section of the city code since 1969; it is unclear if sales were permitted prior to that year.

== Notable people ==
People who were born in, residents of, or otherwise closely associated with Linwood include:

- James F. Allen (born 1960), chairman of Hard Rock International and chief executive officer of Seminole Gaming
- John F. Amodeo (born 1950), member of the New Jersey General Assembly from 2008 to 2014 who represented the 2nd Legislative District and had served on the Linwood City Council from 1998 to 2005
- Sarah Broadhead (1831–1910), author of The Diary of a Lady from Gettysburg, Pennsylvania, who became a resident of Linwood after 1885
- Greg Buttle (born 1954), former NFL linebacker for the New York Jets
- Mark H. Buzby (born 1956), former United States Navy rear admiral who serves as Administrator of the United States Maritime Administration
- Joshua Cohen (born 1980), novelist and story writer, best known for his works Witz (2010) and Book of Numbers (2015)
- Chris Daggett (born 1950), President and CEO of the Geraldine R. Dodge Foundation who ran as an independent candidate for Governor of New Jersey in the 2009 election
- Shereef Elnahal (born 1985), physician who has served as 21st Commissioner of the New Jersey Department of Health
- John F. Gaffney (1934–1995), politician who represented the 2nd Legislative District in the New Jersey General Assembly after serving as Mayor of Linwood from 1976 to 1980
- Rachel Alana Handler (born 1998), actress, singer and motivational speaker who is best known for playing Chunks in the 2016 horror movie Smothered
- Dennis Horner (born 1988), NBA basketball player who has played for the New Jersey Nets
- David B. Joslin (1936–2023), bishop of the Episcopal Diocese of Central New York from 1992 to 2000
- Kenneth Lacovara (born 1961), paleontologist best known for his discovery of Dreadnoughtus
- George Landis, American football coach who was the head football coach at Bloomsburg University of Pennsylvania from 1982 to 1985 and Bucknell University from 1986 to 1988
- Sonia Manzano (born 1950), actress, screenwriter and author, best known for playing the character Maria Rodriguez on the PBS television show Sesame Street between 1971 and 2015
- Mk.gee (born 1997 as Michael Todd Gordon), singer-songwriter, music producer and multi-instrumentalist
- Samuel Ojserkis (born 1990), rower who competed in the men's eight event at the 2016 Summer Olympics
- Kenny Randall (born 1995), professional football defensive lineman for the Winnipeg Blue Bombers of the Canadian Football League
- Jacob Reses, political advisor serving as Chief of Staff to Vice President JD Vance since January 20, 2025
- Tyler Stockton, college football coach and former player who serves as the defensive coordinator and inside linebackers coach at Ball State University
