= The Circle (2017 film) =

2017 American film by James Ponsoldt

- Theatrical release poster
- Directed by: James Ponsoldt
- Screenplay by: James Ponsoldt; Dave Eggers
- Based on: The Circle by Dave Eggers
- Produced by: Anthony Bregman; Gary Goetzman; James Ponsoldt
- Starring: Emma Watson; Tom Hanks; John Boyega; Karen Gillan; Ellar Coltrane; Patton Oswalt; Glenne Headly; Bill Paxton; Ellen Wong
- Cinematography: Matthew Libatique
- Edited by: Lisa Lassek
- Music by: Danny Elfman
- Production companies: Image Nation Abu Dhabi; Playtone; Likely Story; IM Global; Parkes + Macdonald Productions; Route One Entertainment; 1978 Films
- Distributed by: STXfilms; EuropaCorp
- Release dates: April 26, 2017 (Tribeca); April 28, 2017 (United States)
- Running time: 110 minutes
- Country: United States
- Language: English
- Budget: $18 million
- Box office: $45.5 million

The Circle is a 2017 American techno-thriller film directed by James Ponsoldt with a screenplay by Ponsoldt and Dave Eggers, based on Eggers's 2013 novel. The film stars Emma Watson and Tom Hanks, as well as John Boyega, Karen Gillan, Ellar Coltrane, Patton Oswalt, Glenne Headly and Bill Paxton.

The film premiered at the Tribeca Film Festival on April 26, 2017, and was theatrically released on April 28, 2017, by STXfilms and EuropaCorp. It received generally negative reviews, and grossed $20.5 million in the United States and Canada and $25 million in other territories, for a total of $45.5 million, against a production budget of $18 million. It became director Ponsoldt's highest-grossing feature.

The film's release was posthumous for Paxton, who died in February 2017, and it was the final film of Headly's released before her death in June 2017.

== Plot ==
Through her friend Annie, call center intern Mae Holland secures a customer support position at The Circle, a tech and social media company. Mae takes the job, hoping to support her parents, particularly her father who suffers from multiple sclerosis, while her longtime friend Mercer is less supportive. At a company meeting, CEO Eamon Bailey introduces SeeChange, which uses small cameras placed anywhere to provide real-time high-quality video.

Mae rises in The Circle, embracing social networking and meeting Ty Lafitte, who displays suspicion of other, more enthusiastic employees. At an outdoor company rally emphasizing the need for accountability in politics, The Circle's Chief Operating Officer, Tom Stenton, introduces Congresswoman Olivia Santos, who has agreed to open her daily workings to the public through SeeChange.

Ty subsequently shows Mae the area containing the cloud server where all information collected by SeeChange is to be stored. He is the creator of TrueYou, the Circle's social network. Ty says that it has grown out of his control, and its current utilization is not what he intended.

Later, Mae's mother shows Mae a picture of a chandelier Mercer made from deer antlers. She photographs it and shares it on her Circle profile. The image attracts negative attention to Mercer, with people accusing him of killing the deer. He confronts Mae at work and tells her to leave him alone. Distressed, Mae goes kayaking at night and the rough waters cause her kayak to capsize, requiring rescue by the Coast Guard, who were alerted to the emergency through SeeChange cameras, which recorded her both acquiring the kayak and capsizing it.

At the next meeting, Eamon introduces Mae to the crowd and they discuss her experience of the rescue, which moves her to become the first "Circler" to go "completely transparent," which involves wearing a small camera and exposing her life to the world twenty-four hours a day. This damages her relationships with her parents and Annie, as Mae unintentionally exposes private aspects of their lives, so they distance themselves from her as a result.

At a board meeting, Eamon announces support from almost all fifty states for voting through Circle accounts. Mae takes it a step further, and suggests requiring every voting citizen to have a Circle account in order to do so. Eamon and Tom approve, but the suggestion upsets Annie.

At the next company-wide meeting, Mae says that The Circle believes it can find anyone on the planet in under twenty minutes and introduces a program to find wanted felons. The program identifies an escaped child murderer within ten minutes, which prompts the Circlers in the audience to erupt in applause. Mae uses this successful test to suggest transparency can be a force for good.

Mae says that the program can find anyone, so someone suggests Mercer. Mae is hesitant to use the program to locate him, who she knows wants to stay off the grid, but Eamon persuades her to continue as the crowd is demanding it. Mercer is located in an isolated cabin. Startled by Circle users descending upon his home, he flees in a car, though a Circle user placed a small camera on his car window without his knowledge.

They pursue him via automobile, motorbike and a flying drone, which causes Mercer to swerve uncontrollably off a bridge and die. Days later, Mae calls Annie, who has left The Circle and returned to Scotland, which has improved her well-being. Mae, however, finds that connection with others helps her cope with Mercer's death.

Mae returns to The Circle, despite her parents' pleas. Mae calls Ty to ask for a favor, who reveals something that he has discovered. At the next company-wide meeting, Mae explains how connection has helped her recover. She speaks with Eamon, and invites Tom onstage, then invites them both to go fully transparent.

Mae explains that Ty has found all their email accounts and exposed them to the world, as no one should be exempt. Eamon and Tom, upset, try to save face before Tom leaves the stage. Her superiors cut power to her presentation, and the stage goes dark, but the audience activates their mobile devices, illuminating Mae, who reiterates her advocacy of transparency. She later returns to kayaking, untroubled by the drones that shadow her.

== Cast ==
- Emma Watson as Mae Holland
- Tom Hanks as Eamon Bailey
- John Boyega as Ty Lafitte
- Karen Gillan as Annie Allerton
- Ellar Coltrane as Mercer Regalado
- Patton Oswalt as Tom Stenton
- Glenne Headly as Bonnie Holland, Mae's mother
- Bill Paxton as Vinnie Holland, Mae's father
- Mamoudou Athie as Jared
- Smith Cho as Gina
- Nate Corddry as Dan
- Poorna Jagannathan as Dr. Jessica Villalobos
- Judy Reyes as Congresswoman Olivia Santos
- Amir Talai as Matt
- Ellen Wong as Renata
- Elvy Yost as Sabine
- Jimmy Wong as Mitch
- Eve Gordon as Senator Williamson
- Beck as himself

== Production ==
=== Casting and financing ===
On December 15, 2014, Deadline reported that Tom Hanks would star in a film adaptation of Dave Eggers' 2013 novel The Circle, with James Ponsoldt writing and directing. In January 2015, THR confirmed that Anthony Bregman would produce the film through his banner, Likely Story, along with Ponsoldt, Hanks and Gary Goetzman. On May 11, 2015, it was announced that Image Nation Abu Dhabi would fully finance the film, together with Walter Parkes and Laurie MacDonald, while IM Global would handle international sales. IM GLOBAL later sold the rights to various distributors. In June 2015, Emma Watson was officially set to play the lead role of Mae Holland in the film. In August 2015, John Boyega was added to the cast. In September 2015, Karen Gillan, Patton Oswalt, Bill Paxton and Ellar Coltrane joined the cast.

=== Filming ===
Principal photography on the film began on September 11, 2015, in Los Angeles, California. On September 17, filming was taking place in Pasadena. Reshoots were done in January 2017.

== Release ==
In February 2016, EuropaCorp acquired the North American distribution rights to the film, while STX Entertainment co-distributed. The Circle premiered at the Tribeca Film Festival on April 26, 2017 and was theatrically released on April 28, 2017.

There has not been an official Region 2 UK DVD or Blu-ray release. The movie, however, has been released in the US and in some European countries, including Germany.

== Reception ==
=== Box office ===
The Circle grossed $20.5 million in the United States and Canada and $25 million in other territories, for a total of $45.5 million, against a production budget of $18 million.

In the United States and Canada, the film was released alongside How to Be a Latin Lover, Baahubali 2: The Conclusion and Sleight, and was projected to gross $10–12 million from 3,163 theaters during its opening weekend. However, the film underperformed, debuting at number five with $9 million, behind The Fate of the Furious, How to Be a Latin Lover, Baahubali 2: The Conclusion and The Boss Baby.

=== Critical response ===
On review aggregator Rotten Tomatoes, the film holds an approval rating of 15% based on 144 reviews, with an average rating of 4.20/10. The website's critical consensus reads, "The Circle assembles an impressive cast, but this digitally driven thriller spins aimlessly in its half-hearted exploration of timely themes." On Metacritic, the film holds a score of 43 out of 100, based on 32 critics, indicating "mixed or average reviews." Audiences polled by CinemaScore gave the film an average grade of "D+" on an A+ to F scale.

Glenn Kenny of The New York Times criticized the film for its repetitiveness and lack of originality: "The novel is at its most trenchantly funny when depicting the exhausting nature of virtual social life, and it's in this area, too, that the movie gets its very few knowing laughs. But it's plain, not much more than 15 minutes in, that without the story's paranoid aspects you're left with a conceptual framework that's been lapped three times over by the likes of, say, the Joshua Cohen novel Book of Numbers or the HBO comedy series Silicon Valley." Dan Callahan of TheWrap wrote: "The main problem with The Circle is that the evil of the tech company is made so obvious right from the start."

Eric Kohn of IndieWire awarded the film a C. He was especially critical of the film's tonal inconsistencies: "Recent years have seen a proliferation of deep-dive narratives on the information age, from the psychological thriller territory of Mr. Robot to the parodic extremes of Silicon Valley. Ponsoldt's project is stuck in between those two extremes. On the one hand, it's an Orwellian drama about surveillance society; at the same time, it's a sincere workplace drama about young adulthood that shoehorns in some techno-babble for the sake of deepening its potential."

Gregory Wakeman of Cinema Blend panned the film, arguing that "the movie's grand philosophical debate is so simplistic and comes from two opposing and extreme sides of the spectrum that it's basically rendered mute." He also wrote: "Smug, condescending, and completely without incident, The Circle is the reason why people hate Hollywood." Wakeman gave the film one-and-a-half stars out of five. Likewise, Peter Travers of Rolling Stone awarded the film one star out of four. He wrote: "The Circle feels dull, dated and ripped from yesterday's headlines. It flatlines while you're watching it."

In a positive review, John DeFore of The Hollywood Reporter wrote: "The film's final message isn't as difficult to grapple with as the world we're actually living in, but that doesn't make it easy." He also described the film as "a mainstream-friendly critique of social media." Owen Gleiberman of Variety was positive as well, directing much of his praise towards the film's contemporary relevance: "You could call The Circle a dystopian thriller, yet it's not the usual boilerplate sci-fi about grimly abstract oppressors lording it over everyone else. The movie is smarter and creepier than that; it's a cautionary tale for the age of social-media witch hunts and compulsive oversharing. The fascist digital future the movie imagines is darkly intriguing to contemplate, because one's main thought about it is how much of that future is already here." Mick LaSalle of the San Francisco Chronicle also praised the film's timeliness: "What makes The Circle so valuable is not only that it's showing us a ghastly possible path that the world may take, but that it articulates the mentality that could create and sustain it."
