= Claudia Durastanti =

Italian journalist and writer

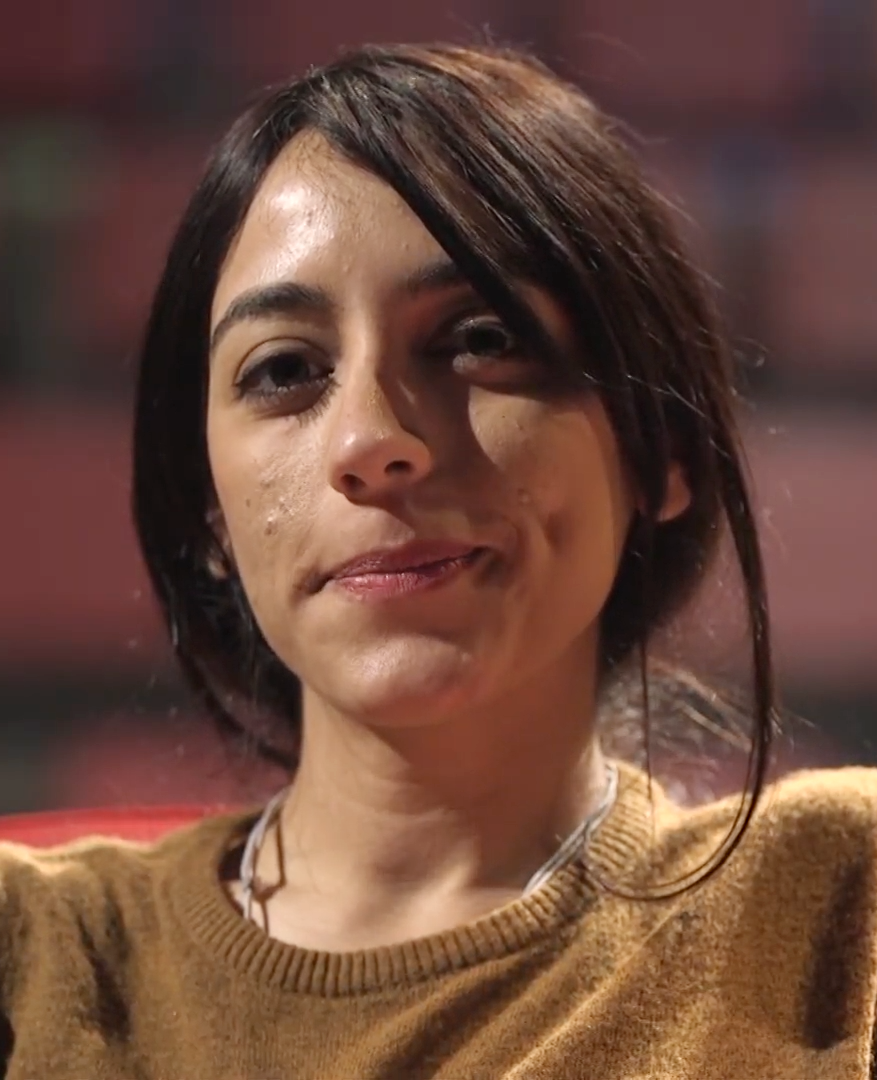
- Claudia Durastanti (2017)
- Born: 8 June 1984 (age 42); Brooklyn, New York, U.S.
- Citizenship: Italy; United States
- Occupations: Novelist, translator, journalist
- Writing career
- Language: Italian; English
- Years active: 2010–present

Claudia Durastanti (born 8 June 1984) is an Italian writer and translator.

== Early life ==
Durastanti was born in the Brooklyn neighborhood of Bensonhurst to two deaf Italian parents, who divorced in 1990. After their divorce, Durastanti (aged 6) moved to the Basilicata region of southern Italy with her mother. This and other aspects of her life (like an incident in which her father kidnapped her as a child) are described in her semi-autobiographical novel La Straniera (published in English as Strangers I Know).

Durastanti studied cultural anthropology at the Sapienza University of Rome and continued her studies at De Montfort University. She then returned to Rome where she earned a master's degree in publishing and journalism.

== Career ==
Durastanti was shortlisted for the 2019 Strega Prize and Viareggio Prize with La Straniera (La nave di Teseo, 2019). The book is translated into twenty-one languages and is being adapted into a TV show.

Her work has appeared in Granta, the Los Angeles Review of Books and The Serving Library.

She is a board member of the Turin International Book Fair and co-founded the Italian Festival of Literature in London.

She has translated several works into Italian, including Joshua Cohen's The Netanyahus and Donna Haraway's Staying with the Trouble, as well as Ocean Vuong's On Earth We're Briefly Gorgeous and F. Scott Fitzgerald's The Great Gatsby.

She writes a music column for Internazionale and serves as a curator for the feminist imprint La Tartaruga, founded by Laura Lepetit in 1975.

== Personal life ==
At various points in her life, she has lived in Brooklyn, Basilicata, London, and Rome. After the publication of Strangers I Know, she briefly lived in New York during the COVID-19 pandemic, before moving back to Rome, where she lived as of January 2023.

== Works ==
=== In Italian ===
- Un giorno verrò a lanciare sassi alla tua finestra, Venezia, Marsilio, 2010 ISBN 978-88-317-0572-1.
- A Chloe, per le ragioni sbagliate, Venezia, Marsilio, 2013 ISBN 978-88-317-1670-3.
- Cleopatra va in prigione, Roma, minimum fax, 2016 ISBN 978-88-7521-745-7.
- La straniera, Milano, La nave di Teseo, 2019 ISBN 978-88-93447-75-1.
- Missitalia, Milano, La nave di Teseo, 2024 ISBN 978-88-34616-36-9.

==== In English ====
- Cleopatra Goes to Prison, translated by Christine Donougher, Dublin: The Dedalus Press, 2020. ISBN 9781910213964
- Strangers I Know, translated by Elizabeth Harris, Fitzcarraldo Editions, January 2022.
- Missitalia, translated by Jamie Richards, Fitzcarraldo Editions and Summit Books, April 2027.

=== Translations ===
- Il fantasma del sabato sera. Interviste sulla vita e la musica (Tom Waits on Tom Waits: Interviews and Encounters) by Tom Waits, Rome, minimum fax, 2012 ISBN 978-88-7521-444-9
- Shotgun Lovesongs by Nickolas Butler, Venice, Marsilio, 2014 ISBN 978-88-3171-904-9
- Il cuore degli uomini (The Hearts of Men) by Nickolas Butler, Venice, Marsilio, 2017 ISBN 9788831726269
- Future sex by Emily Witt, Rome, minimum fax, 2017 ISBN 9788875216535
- Sotto il falò (Beneath the Bonfire) by Nickolas Butler, Venice, Marsilio, 2018 ISBN 9788831729376
- Atlante sentimentale dei colori (The Secret Lives of Colour) by Kassia St Clair, Turin, UTET, 2018 ISBN 9788851164423
- Un'altra occupazione (Moving Kings) by Joshua Cohen, Turin, Codice Edizioni, 2018 ISBN 9788875787479
- Il museo delle relazioni interrotte by Olinka Vištica and Drazen Grubisic, Milan, Mondadori, 2018 ISBN 9788804705246
- Le regole non valgono (The Rules Do Not Apply) by Ariel Levy, Milan, Bompiani, 2018
- In cucina con Kafka (Baking with Kafka) by Tom Gauld, Milan, Mondadori, 2018 ISBN 9788804686606
- "Il trucco della bottiglia" by Nalo Hopkinson, "Il sonno delle piante" by Anne Richter, "Racconti dal seno" by Hiromi Goto in Le Visionarie. Fantascienza, fantasy e femminismo: un'antologia (Sisters of the Revolution: A Feminist Speculative Fiction Anthology) by AA. VV., edited by Ann & Jeff VanderMeer, Rome, NERO, 2018
- Mooncop. Poliziotto lunare by Tom Gauld, Milan, Mondadori, 2019 ISBN 9788804713784
- Il libro dei numeri (Book of Numbers) by Joshua Cohen, Turin, Codice Edizioni, 2019 ISBN 9788875788124
- La trama del mondo. I tessuti che hanno fatto la storia by Kassia St Clair, Torino, UTET, 2019 ISBN 9788851174309
- Chthulucene (Staying with the Trouble) by Donna Haraway, Rome, NERO, 2019, (with Clara Ciccioni) ISBN 9788880560449
- Schadenfreude. La gioia per le disgrazie altrui by Tiffany Watt Smith, Turin, UTET, 2019 ISBN 9788851169312
- Brevemente risplendiamo sulla terra (On Earth We're Briefly Gorgeous) by Ocean Vuong, Milan, La nave di Teseo, 2020 ISBN 9788834601327
- Tempi eccitanti (Exciting Times) by Naoise Dolan, Rome, Edizioni Atlantide, 2020
- Madre delle ossa (The Bone Mother) by David Demchuk, Milan, Zona 42, 2020
- La nostra furiosa amicizia (The Knockout Queen) by Rufi Thorpe, Turin, Bollati Boringhieri, 2021
- La fattoria degli animali (Animal Farm) by George Orwell, Milan, Garzanti, 2021
- Quattro nuovi messaggi (Four New Messages) by Joshua Cohen, Turin, Codice Edizioni, 2021 ISBN 9788875789565
- Tempi moderni (Modern Times) by Cathy Sweeney, Milan, il Saggiatore, 2021
- Notti insonni (Sleepless Nights) by Elizabeth Hardwick, Milan, Blackie Edizioni, 2021 ISBN 9788831321136
- Chinatown interiore (Interior Chinatown) by Charles Yu, Milan, La nave di Teseo, 2021 ISBN 9788834606353
- I Terranauti (The Terranauts) by T. C. Boyle, Milan, La nave di Teseo, 2022
- Un fantasma in gola (A Ghost in the Throat) by Doireann Ní Ghríofa, Milan, Il Saggiatore, 2022 ISBN 978-8842829652
- I Netanyahu (The Netanyahus) by Joshua Cohen, Turin, Codice Edizioni, 2022 ISBN 979-1254500132
- Le cinque ferite (The Five Wounds) by Kirstin Valdez Quade, Milan, La nave di Teseo, 2022 ISBN 978-8834610633
- Notte al neon (Night, Neon: Tales of Mystery and Suspense) by Joyce Carol Oates, Carbonio editore 2022 ISBN 9791280794048
- Sangue e viscere al liceo (Blood and Guts in High School) by Kathy Acker, Bari, LiberAria Editrice, 2023
- Il fratello del famoso Jack (Brother of the More Famous Jack) by Barbara Trapido, Milan, HarperCollins Italia, 2023
- Passeggiare la notte (Nightcrawling) by Leila Mottley, Turin, Bollati Boringhieri, 2023
- Gli uomini (The Men) by Sandra Newman, Florence, Ponte Alle Grazie, 2023 ISBN 9788833319759
- La coppia felice (The Happy Couple) by Naoise Dolan, Rome, Edizioni di Atlantide, 2023 ISBN 9791280028389
