= John Stone (American football) =

American football player (born 1979)

No. 86, 15
- Position: Wide receiver

Personal information
- Born: July 7, 1979 (age 47); Somers Point, New Jersey, U.S.
- Listed height: 5 ft 11 in (1.80 m)
- Listed weight: 185 lb (84 kg)

Career information
- High school: Mainland Regional (NJ)
- College: Wake Forest
- NFL draft: 2002: undrafted

Career history
- Indianapolis Colts (2002)*; Oakland Raiders (2003–2005); New England Patriots (2006)*
- * Offseason or practice squad member only

Awards and highlights
- Second-team All-ACC (2001)
- Stats at Pro Football Reference

John Stone (born July 7, 1979) is an American former professional football wide receiver. He was signed as an undrafted free agent by the Indianapolis Colts in 2002. He played college football at Wake Forest.

Stone was also a member of the Oakland Raiders and New England Patriots.

Stone attended Mainland Regional High School in Linwood, New Jersey.
