= Kenny Randall =

American football player (born 1995)

Profile
- Position: Defensive lineman

Personal information
- Born: December 7, 1995 (age 30); Atlantic City, New Jersey, U.S.
- Listed height: 6 ft 4 in (1.93 m)
- Listed weight: 300 lb (136 kg)

Career information
- High school: Mainland (Linwood, New Jersey)
- College: Charleston
- NFL draft: 2021: undrafted

Career history
- Jacksonville Jaguars (2021)*; Winnipeg Blue Bombers (2022)*; New Jersey Generals (2023); Winnipeg Blue Bombers (2024)*
- * Offseason or practice squad member only

Awards and highlights
- First-team All-MEC (2019); Second-team All-MEC (2018)
- Stats at Pro Football Reference
- Stats at CFL.ca

Kenneth Randall (born December 7, 1995) is an American professional football defensive lineman. He played college football at Charleston.

== Early life ==
Kenneth Randall was born on December 7, 1995, in Atlantic City, New Jersey. Raised in Linwood, New Jersey, he played high school football and basketball at Mainland Regional High School. In the summer of 2011, as a sophomore in high school, Randall and seven of his teammates were on their way to a restaurant after the football preseason had ended. However, the SUV they were in flipped and four of Randall's teammates died. Randall graduated from Mainland in 2014, and then spent a postgraduate year at Milford Academy.

== College career ==
Randall played college football for the Charleston Golden Eagles of the University of Charleston. He played in eight games as a freshman in 2015, recording two solo tackles, four assisted tackles, and one forced fumble. He was dismissed from the university due to poor grades, and then spent time working at Sam's Club. After losing 120 pounds (about 400 to 280) and missing the 2016 and 2017 seasons, Randall was accepted back onto the football team at the University of Charleston. He played in all 11 games his sophomore year in 2018, totaling 20 solo tackles, 26 assisted tackles, and two sacks while earning second-team All-Mountain East Conference (MEC) honors. He appeared in all 11 games for the second straight year in 2019, recording 29 solo tackles, 35 assisted tackles, seven sacks, two forced fumbled, two fumble recoveries, and two blocked kicks. For his performance during the 2019 season, Randall was named first-team All-MEC and Don Hansen's Football Gazette Region 1 third-team All-Defense. Randall opted out of the abbreviated 2020–21 NCAA Division II football season.

== Professional career ==
After going undrafted in the 2021 NFL draft, Randall signed with the Jacksonville Jaguars on May 6, 2021. He was later waived on August 24, 2021.

Randall was signed by the Winnipeg Blue Bombers of the Canadian Football League (CFL) on April 18, 2022. He was released on June 5, 2022, before the start of the 2022 CFL season.

On October 6, 2022, Randall with the New Jersey Generals of the United States Football League (USFL) for the 2023 USFL season. He started all ten games for the Generals in 2023, posting 25 tackles, 2.5 sacks, and two pass breakups.

Randall signed with the Blue Bombers again on February 2, 2024. He was placed on the team' s reserve/suspended list on May 12, 2024.
