= Mainland Regional High School (New Jersey) =

High school in Atlantic County, New Jersey, US

Address
- 1301 Oak Avenue Linwood, Atlantic County, New Jersey, 08221; United States
- Coordinates: 39.34591°N 74.575392°W

District information
- Grades: 9—12
- Superintendent: Mark Marrone
- Business administrator: Chandra Coady
- Schools: 1

Students and staff
- Enrollment: 1,160 (as of 2024–25)
- Faculty: 95.6 FTEs
- Student–teacher ratio: 12.1:1

Other information
- District Factor Group: DE
- Website: mainlandregional.net
Ind.	Per pupil	District spending	Rank (*)	9—12 average	%± vs. average
1A	Total Spending	$22,114	31	$18,891	17.1%
1	Budgetary Cost	16,143	25	15,592	3.5%
2	Classroom Instruction	9,551	32	8,807	8.4%
6	Support Services	2,255	21	2,294	−1.7%
8	Administrative Cost	1,267	2	1,592	−20.4%
10	Operations & Maintenance	1,941	21	1,954	−0.7%
13	Extracurricular Activities	920	30	873	5.4%
16	Median Teacher Salary	85,715	45	71,726
Data from NJDoE 2014 Taxpayers' Guide to Education Spending. *Of 9—12 districts with any number of students. Lowest spending=1; Highest=47

Mainland Regional High School

Information
- Type: Public high school
- Established: 1961
- NCES School ID: 340936000158
- Principal: David Jacobs
- Faculty: 95.6 FTEs
- Grades: 9-12
- Enrollment: 1,160 (as of 2024–25)
- Student to teacher ratio: 12.1:1
- Colors: Kelly green white
- Athletics conference: Cape-Atlantic League (general); West Jersey Football League (football)
- Team name: Mustangs
- Newspaper: Hoofprints
- Yearbook: Montage

Mainland Regional High School is a regional public high school and school district serving students in grades nine through twelve from the communities of Linwood, Northfield and Somers Point in Atlantic County, in the U.S. state of New Jersey, serving a total population of over 25,000 in the three communities. The high school is located in Linwood. The school is the only facility of the Mainland Regional High School District.

As of the 2024–25 school year, the school had an enrollment of 1,160 students and 95.6 classroom teachers (on an FTE basis), for a student–teacher ratio of 12.1:1. There were 268 students (23.1% of enrollment) eligible for free lunch and 41 (3.5% of students) eligible for reduced-cost lunch.

The school is fully accredited by the New Jersey Department of Education.

The district participates in the Interdistrict Public School Choice Program, which allows non-resident students to attend school in the district at no cost to their parents, with tuition covered by the resident district.

== History ==
In December 1958, a plan for a $2.1 million (equivalent to $23.4 million in 2025) school building was cut to $1.5 million after a review of the proposal by a pair of state agencies.

In September 1959, the three constituent districts were notified by the Ocean City School District that overcrowding would mean that it would no longer be able to continue accepting students from the communities at Ocean City High School starting in the 1959-60 school year.

The school opened for the 1961-62 school year, with rising seniors from Linwood and Somers Point given the option to complete their schooling at Ocean City High School and those from Northfield to finish up at Pleasantville High School.

The district had been classified by the New Jersey Department of Education as being in District Factor Group "DE", the fifth-highest of eight groupings. District Factor Groups organize districts statewide to allow comparison by common socioeconomic characteristics of the local districts. From lowest socioeconomic status to highest, the categories are A, B, CD, DE, FG, GH, I and J.

== Awards, recognition and rankings ==
For the 1997-98 school year, Mainland Regional High School was formally designated by the United States Department of Education as a National Blue Ribbon School, the highest honor that an American school can achieve.

In the 2011 "Ranking America's High Schools" issue by The Washington Post, the school was ranked 26th in New Jersey and 910th nationwide. In Newsweek's May 22, 2007 issue, ranking the country's top high schools, Mainland Regional High School was listed in 719th place, the 14th-highest ranked school in New Jersey. The school ranked as number 310 in Newsweek magazine's 2005 listing of "America's Best High Schools".

The school was the 95th-ranked public high school in New Jersey out of 339 schools statewide in New Jersey Monthly magazine's September 2014 cover story on the state's "Top Public High Schools", using a new ranking methodology. The school had been ranked 81st in the state of 328 schools in 2012, after being ranked 139th in 2010 out of 322 schools listed. The magazine ranked the school 116th in 2008 out of 316 schools. The school was ranked 104th in the magazine's September 2006 issue, which surveyed 316 schools across the state. Schooldigger.com ranked the school 111th out of 381 public high schools statewide in its 2011 rankings (an increase of 47 positions from the 2010 ranking) which were based on the combined percentage of students classified as proficient or above proficient on the mathematics (86.1%) and language arts literacy (96.0%) components of the High School Proficiency Assessment (HSPA).

== Athletics ==
The Mainland Regional High School Mustangs compete in the American Division of the Cape-Atlantic League, an athletic conference comprised of public and private high schools in Atlantic, Cape May, Cumberland and Gloucester counties, operating under the aegis of the New Jersey State Interscholastic Athletic Association (NJSIAA). With 936 students in grades 10-12, the school was classified by the NJSIAA for the 2019–20 school year as Group III for most athletic competition purposes, which included schools with an enrollment of 761 to 1,058 students in that grade range. The football team competes in the United Division of the 94-team West Jersey Football League superconference and was classified by the NJSIAA as Group III South for football for 2024–2026, which included schools with 695 to 882 students.

The field hockey team won the South II sectional championship in 1973 and won both the South Jersey Group III sectional title and the overall Group III state championship in 1975. The 1973 team won the Group III title against West Essex High School on a tiebreaker following a 0-0 tie after regulation in the championship game.

The football team won the South Jersey Group III state sectional title in 1980, 1996, 1997 and 2002, and won the South Jersey Group IV title in 2008. The 1980 team scored two touchdowns in the span of 76 seconds to stage a comeback and win the South Jersey Group III state sectional championship by a score of 12-7 against an Overbrook High School team that had come into the finals undefeated. In 1996, the team won the South Jersey Group III title with a 14-7 win in the championship game against Pennsauken High School at The College of New Jersey. The team won the 2002 South Jersey Group III state championship, defeating Delsea Regional High School 21-7 in the final. In 2008, the football team won their first South Jersey Group IV sectional championship with a 21-14 win against Southern Regional High School, going 12-0 for the first time. The football team had won the 1995 South Jersey Group III title with a 42-14 victory over top-seeded Woodrow Wilson High School, but the title was later vacated by the NJSIAA due to the use of an ineligible player who had played despite being suspended.

The boys' basketball team won the 1981 Group III state championship, defeating Randolph High School by a score of 61-47 in the title game.

The boys' track team won the indoor track state championship in Group III in 1996.

The boys' track team won the Group III state indoor relay championship in 1996.

The boys' tennis team won the Group III state championship in 1997, winning the tournament's final against Princeton High School.

The boys' cross country running team won the Group III state championship in 2001 and 2002, and won the Group IV title in 2003. The team won the Meet of Champions in 2002 and 2003. The team's average time of 16:19, was a second off of the record set by Christian Brothers Academy in 1982 for the state championship course in Holmdel Township, New Jersey.

In 2002, the golf team won the state championship, giving them the #1 ranking in the state for the 2003 season. In 2010, Mainland's Kylie Strijek won the girls' state Tournament of Champions.

The boys' swimming team has won the Public B state championship in 2003 and 2016-2019. In 2003, the boys' swim team won Mainland's first ever swimming state championship by beating Princeton High School 91-79 in the Public B state final. The boys' swimming team finished the season with a 15-0 record and won its second Public B title in 2016, with a 99-71 win against Scotch Plains-Fanwood High School in the tournament final The team won its second consecutive title in 2017 with a 103-67 victory over Soctch Plains-Fanwood.

In 2007, the girls' junior eight and the boys' second eight rowing teams won the New Jersey state championship.

In 2008, the JV girls' rowing team won the National Championships.

The girls tennis team won the Group III state championship in 1990, defeating Ramapo High School by 4-1 in the tournament final. In 2015, the team won the South Jersey Group II title with a 4-1 win in the tournament final against Seneca High School.

The baseball team were 2014 South Jersey Group III champions and won the Group III state championship with a 5-3 win in the tournament final against Mount Olive High School.

The girls' basketball team won the Group III state championship in 2019 (vs. Chatham High School) and 2024 (vs. Chatham). The team won the 2019 Group III title with a 42-35 win against runner-up Chatham High School in the finals of the tournament at the RWJBarnabas Health Arena. The team advanced to the Tournament of Champions as the sixth seed, falling to Manchester Township High School by a score of 74-44 in the quarterfinal round, to finish the season with a 28-4 record.

== Marching band ==
The Mainland Marching Mustangs, a founding TOB member, were named Tournament of Bands Chapter One Group II Champions in 1979, Group III Champions in 1980, Group III Champions in 1984, and Group I Champions in 1989.

Mainland won the USSBA New Jersey state championship in 2005, 2006, and were named Northern All-State Group 1A Champions in 2008. The Mainland Regional Marching Band's color guard won Best Color Guard, Best Visual and had a score of 95.738 at USBands National Championships for group 2A in 2012 and captured the Region 1 and State Championships in both 2014 and 2015.

The band competes in USBands Group 2A. The Mustangs achieved an undefeated season in 2019 and won Atlantic Coast Championships for the first time in circuit history and received the highest score in Mainland Regional history with a score of 95.54 while winning captions for Best Music and Best Visual. The Mustangs achieved a second undefeated season in 2023 and won the USBands National Championships in 2023 for the first time in school history with a score of 94.40 and winning all major captions in Best Music, Best Visual, and Best Effect, as well as winning Best Percussion.

== Mock trial and drama ==
Mainland's mock trial team won the Vincent J. Apruzzese Mock Trial Competition covering the whole state of New Jersey in 2003 and went on to compete in the National High School Mock Trial Championship in New Orleans. On March 31, 2009, the Mainland team won the state championship in New Brunswick, New Jersey. They went undefeated (11-0) to get there, after winning county and regional tournaments and went on to participate in the American Mock Trial Invitational.

In 2019, the school won the Looby Cup for the eighth consecutive time, the state title of the New Jersey Drama and Forensic League, which includes competitions in various aspects of theater and speech.

== Controversy and incidents ==
=== 2006 graduation controversy ===
In Mainland Regional High School's graduation of 2006, valedictorian Kareem Elnahal gave an unauthorized speech instead of the approved one. In his speech he criticized Mainland saying "the education we have received here is not only incomplete, it is entirely hollow." After delivering his speech, Elnahal received an ovation from some of the students in the audience. Kareem then left the graduation ceremonies before receiving his diploma.

=== 2008 graduation controversy ===
During the 2008 graduation ceremony, Salutatorian Jennifer Chau's speech was cut off, after she strayed from her approved text and issued a criticism of the school's administration. Students and parents in the audience protested the cut off, requesting that she be allowed to finish her remarks. Chau's issue revolved around a decision by the school board to not let her receive credit for a freshman honors class, which allowed another student (Rebecca Ojserkis), the child of one of the Board of Education members (Janice Colton Ojserkis), to be chosen as valedictorian.

=== October 2006 bomb threats ===
Mainland experienced several bomb threats during the beginning of the 2006–2007 school year. A series of four written threats in a five-school day time span were left by students throughout the school. Two girls held responsible were placed on probation, required to do community service, pay restitution and face fines of up to $11,000 to cover costs incurred by several local, county and state police departments. School officials have implied that the students arrested will be prosecuted to the fullest extent of the law. Five Mainland students were arrested for making bomb threats and also two Mainland students are arrested for causing a fire in the girls' bathroom.

=== Death of four football players in 2011 ===
In August 2011, four players from the school's football team were killed in a crash on the Garden State Parkway on their way to an annual team breakfast.

=== 2013 chemical spill ===
In May 2013, incorrectly mixed pool chemicals caused chlorine vapors to spread through the school's hallways. The school was promptly evacuated and 30 students and staff were treated at area hospitals for symptoms related to exposure to the fumes. School sessions resumed after the weekend once the chemical fumes had been vented successfully.

== Administration ==
Core members of the district's / school's administration are:

- Mark Marrone, superintendent
- Chandra Coady, business administrator and board secretary
- David Jacobs, principal

== Board of education ==
The district's board of education, comprised of nine members, sets policy and oversees the fiscal and educational operation of the district through its administration. As a Type II school district, the board's trustees are elected directly by voters to serve three-year terms of office on a staggered basis, with three seats up for election each year held (since 2012) as part of the November general election. The board appoints a superintendent to oversee the district's day-to-day operations and a business administrator to supervise the business functions of the district. Seats on the board of education are allocated based on population, with four seats assigned to Somers Point, three to Northfield and two to Linwood.

== Notable alumni ==
- James F. Allen (born 1960), chairman of Hard Rock International and chief executive officer of Seminole Gaming
- Matt Broomall (born 1994), former soccer player
- Greg Buttle (born 1954), former NFL linebacker
- Joshua Cohen (born 1980), novelist and story writer
- Shereef Elnahal (born 1985), physician who served as the Under Secretary of Veterans Affairs for Health in the Biden Administration
- Rachel Alana Handler (born 1988), actress, singer and motivational speaker
- Kenneth Lacovara (born 1961), paleontologist best known for his discovery of Dreadnoughtus
- David Laid (born 1998), fitness influencer, YouTuber and fitness model
- George Landis, American football coach who was the head football coach at Bloomsburg University of Pennsylvania from 1982 to 1985 and Bucknell University from 1986 to 1988
- Mk.gee (born 1997 as Michael Todd Gordon), singer-songwriter, music producer and multi-instrumentalist
- Samuel Ojserkis (born 1990), rower who competed in the men's eight event at the 2016 Summer Olympics
- Osun Osunniyi (born 1998), professional basketball player for USC Heidelberg.
- Jennifer Pershing (born 1980 as Jennifer Ackley), Miss March 2009 in Playboy magazine
- Chase Petty (born 2003), baseball pitcher for the Cincinnati Reds
- Kenny Randall (born 1995), football defensive lineman for the Winnipeg Blue Bombers of the Canadian Football League
- Jacob Reses, political advisor serving as Chief of Staff to Vice President JD Vance since January 20, 2025
- Stephen H. Segal (born 1975), Hugo Award-winning editorial chief of Weird Tales magazine
- John Stone (born 1979), former NFL wide receiver
- Madhavi Sunder (born 1970/71, class of 1988), professor at Georgetown University Law Center known for her work on intellectual property, law and technology, women's human rights, and international development
- Tim Watson (born 1974), former NFL defensive tackle
