= Sarah Broadhead =

Teacher and diarist (1831–1910)

Sarah Middleton Robbins Broadhead (11 December 1831 – 21 March 1910, in Winslow, Pennsylvania) was a teacher, diarist, and resident of Gettysburg, Pennsylvania during the Battle of Gettysburg. She was the author of The Diary of a Lady of Gettysburg, Pennsylvania from June 15 to July 15, 1863, which is a primary historical source for what happened during the battle and especially how it impacted the residents of the borough. It has been called the most comprehensive written document on the role of women in the Civil War. Ken Burns quoted entries from the diary in his 1990 documentary series, The Civil War.

== Biography ==
=== Civil War years ===
Sarah Broadhead lived with her husband Joseph and their then four-year-old daughter Mary at the western end of Chambersburg Street, Gettysburg. She was a teacher by profession and the Broadheads were members of the Religious Society of Friends. The diary tells of her life during that month and relates information that would have otherwise been lost. When the battle raged outside their house the family took shelter in their basement. She describes the aftermath of the battle in detail and the destruction and human toil that resulted. She helped nurse the survivors, taking three wounded soldiers into her home. She wrote that there were things she would never forget. The account she gave was deeply personal.

The United States Sanitary Commission provided aid and supplies to the field hospital located at the Lutheran Seminary. In 1864, Sarah had her diary privately published, printing 200 copies, as a 24-page pamphlet. She gave copies to family and friends who inquired about her experiences during and after the battle. She donated 75 copies of the diary to the commission to be sold to raise funds at the Great Central Fair, held in Philadelphia in June 1864.

=== Later life and death ===
About 1885, Joseph and Sarah moved, for reasons unknown to history, to what soon thereafter became Linwood, New Jersey, where they lived the rest of their lives. They were both active in community affairs and Joseph (1830–1903) was, in 1889, elected a member of the first borough council. They were buried in the Friends burying ground, now known as Friends Central Cemetery, on Shore Road in Linwood. Their son Benjamin (1869–1918) and his wife Lydia are buried next to them. The cemetery has been, since 1944, the church cemetery of Central United Methodist Church.

== Legacy ==
On June 6, 2015, the Linwood Historical Society dedicated a monument to Sarah Broadhead at her grave-site recognizing her contribution to the history of the Gettysburg Battle and her humanitarian work in its aftermath. The ceremony was attended by three of her great-great-granddaughters.

== See also ==
- Ginnie Wade
- Tillie Pierce
