= Lee Yaron =

Israeli journalist (born 1994)

- לי ירון
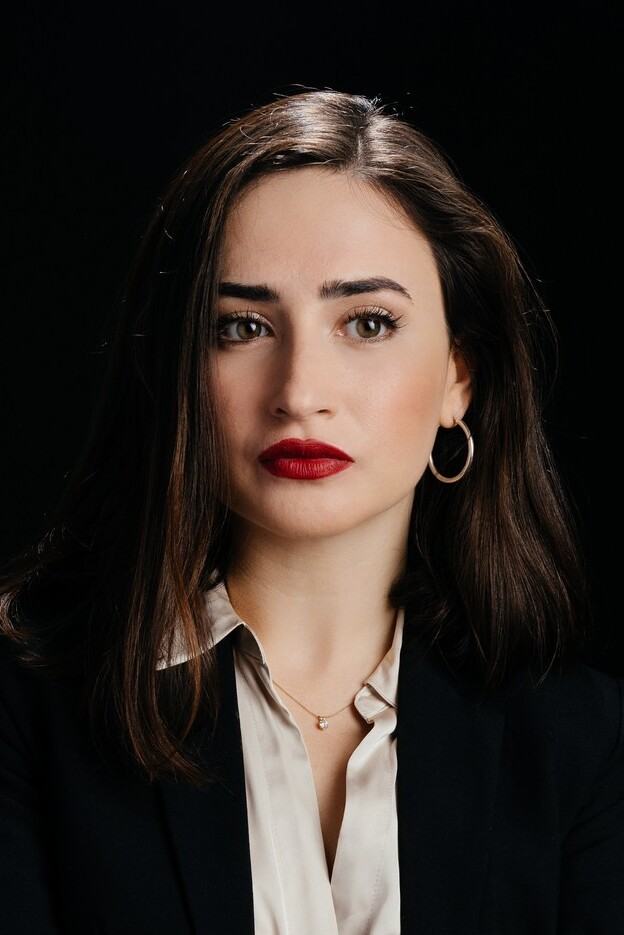
- Yaron in 2021
- Born: 1994 (age 31–32); Tel Aviv-Yafo, Israel
- Education: Columbia University (MPA)
- Occupations: Journalist, author, theater director
- Website: www.leeyaron.com

Lee Yaron (Hebrew: לי ירון, born 1994) is an Israeli journalist, author, and theater director who is the climate crisis and New York correspondent for Haaretz. She is an elected member-representative on the Executive Committee of the Union of Journalists in Israel. Her book 10/7: 100 Human Stories won the National Jewish Book Award in 2025.

== Biography ==
Lee Yaron was born in 1994 in Tel Aviv, attending Ironi Alef High School. She received a Masters of Public Administration in Environmental Science and Policy from Columbia University in 2024.

She enlisted in the Israeli Defense Forces (IDF) in 2012, where she served as a military reporter for Bamahane, the official IDF magazine.

Yaron joined Haaretz in 2015 as its chief social welfare correspondent. During this time, she uncovered corruption scandals in the municipalities of Netanya and Rishon LeZion and the discrimination of same-sex couples in adoption proceedings. She is now the newspaper's New York correspondent.

In 2021, Yaron was elected to the Executive Committee of the Union of Israeli Journalists. In 2022 she received the Yitzhak Livni "Knight" Award for Free Speech in Media. She was featured on the Forbes 30 under 30 list in 2025.

In 2024, Yaron published 10/7: 100 Human Stories, a book documenting the personal stories of those involved in the October 7 attacks. The book won the National Jewish Book Award in 2025, making Yaron the youngest winner in its history. The book has been published in English, French, German and Dutch.

Yaron is also the founder of Green Idea, the first journalist training program in the Middle East dedicated to climate coverage.

== Personal life ==
Yaron is married to novelist Joshua Cohen. She has written and directed several plays with the goal of bring attention to marginalized communities in Israel and the Middle East.
