= David Laid =

American fitness influencer (born 1998)

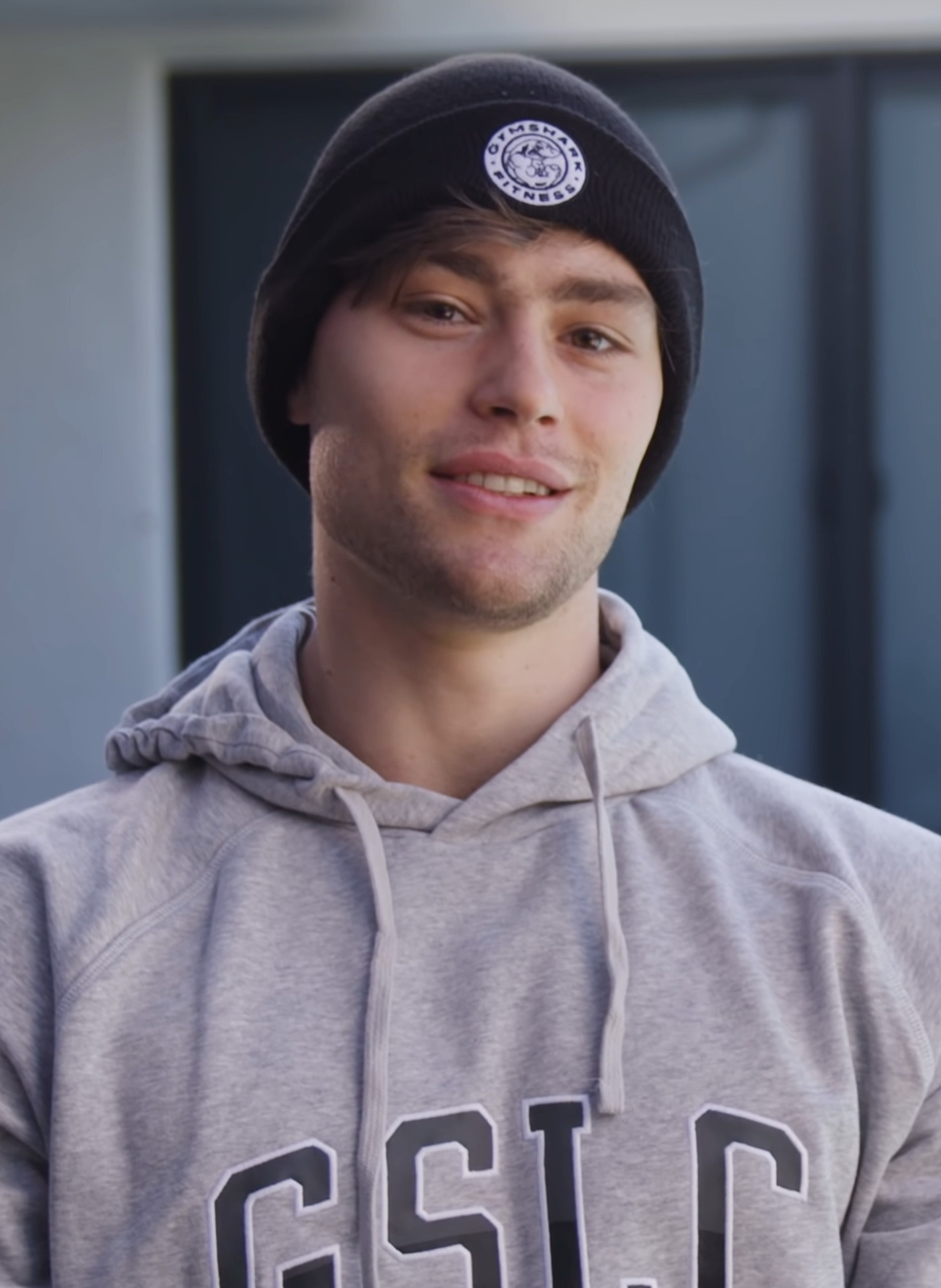
- Laid in 2021
- Born: January 29, 1998 (age 28); Estonia
- Occupations: Influencer; YouTuber; fitness model
- Years active: 2013–present

Instagram information
- Page: David Laid
- Followers: 6 million

YouTube information
- Channel: David Laid
- Genres: Fitness; vlog
- Subscribers: 2.32 million
- Views: 261 million
- Last updated: October 4, 2026
- Website: davidlaid.com

David Laid (born January 29, 1998) is an Estonian-American influencer, YouTuber and fitness model. He became popular with his transformation videos on YouTube, which showcased his changing physique starting at 14 years old as a result of weightlifting. He was named Gymshark's creative director of lifting in 2023.

== Early life ==
David Laid was born in Estonia, where his mother, Nino, had previously immigrated from Russia. After his father died from falling off a docked cruise ship when he was two years old, his mother immigrated with him to the United States, where she opened a café. Laid was raised in Atlantic City, New Jersey, and attended Mainland Regional High School, where he received average grades.

== Weightlifting and later career ==
While playing hockey, Laid was diagnosed with scoliosis at age 14, and soon after—inspired by fitness YouTubers such as the Hodgetwins, Marc Fitt, and Jeff Seid— and by mockery from his peers for his then-thin frame— he began working out and bulking. He later became known for his transformation videos on YouTube beginning at that age, uploading his first, an 18-month-long transformation, in December 2013. His second, uploaded in August 2015, documented his body's changes from ages 14 to 17 and became especially popular, earning over 14 million views by 2016 and 43 million views by 2021.

Laid had 800 thousand YouTube subscribers in 2019. Around that time, Laid also became popular as a trainee of bodybuilding coach Elliott Atwell, who was later sentenced to 20 years in federal prison in 2025 for manipulating at least six of his underage training clients into recording themselves performing sexual acts and sending him the videos. By 2021, Laid had over 1.7 million followers on Instagram. After having previously been an athletic model for the direct-to-consumer fitness brand Gymshark, Laid was appointed its creative director of lifting in 2023, also launching and curating the brand's lifting social media accounts. He had over 6 million followers on Instagram in 2025.

== Personal life and image ==
Laid tried a vegan diet for a month in 2020, trying it again for a longer period in 2023. He is based in New Jersey as of 2026. Laid has stated that he has suffered from body dysmorphia.

MEL's Angelina Chapin wrote that Laid had become a "role model" for young boys on YouTube by 2016, while, that same year, ABC News wrote that he "look[ed] to be the poster boy for physical perfection" and compared his habits to "bigorexia". For USA Today, Marco della Cava wrote in 2021 that Laid's fitness journey had become a "touchstone for many teens", with many commenters on his YouTube videos "debat[ing] whether Laid took steroids".
