= Linwood Borough School No. 1 =

- U.S. National Register of Historic Places
- New Jersey Register of Historic Places
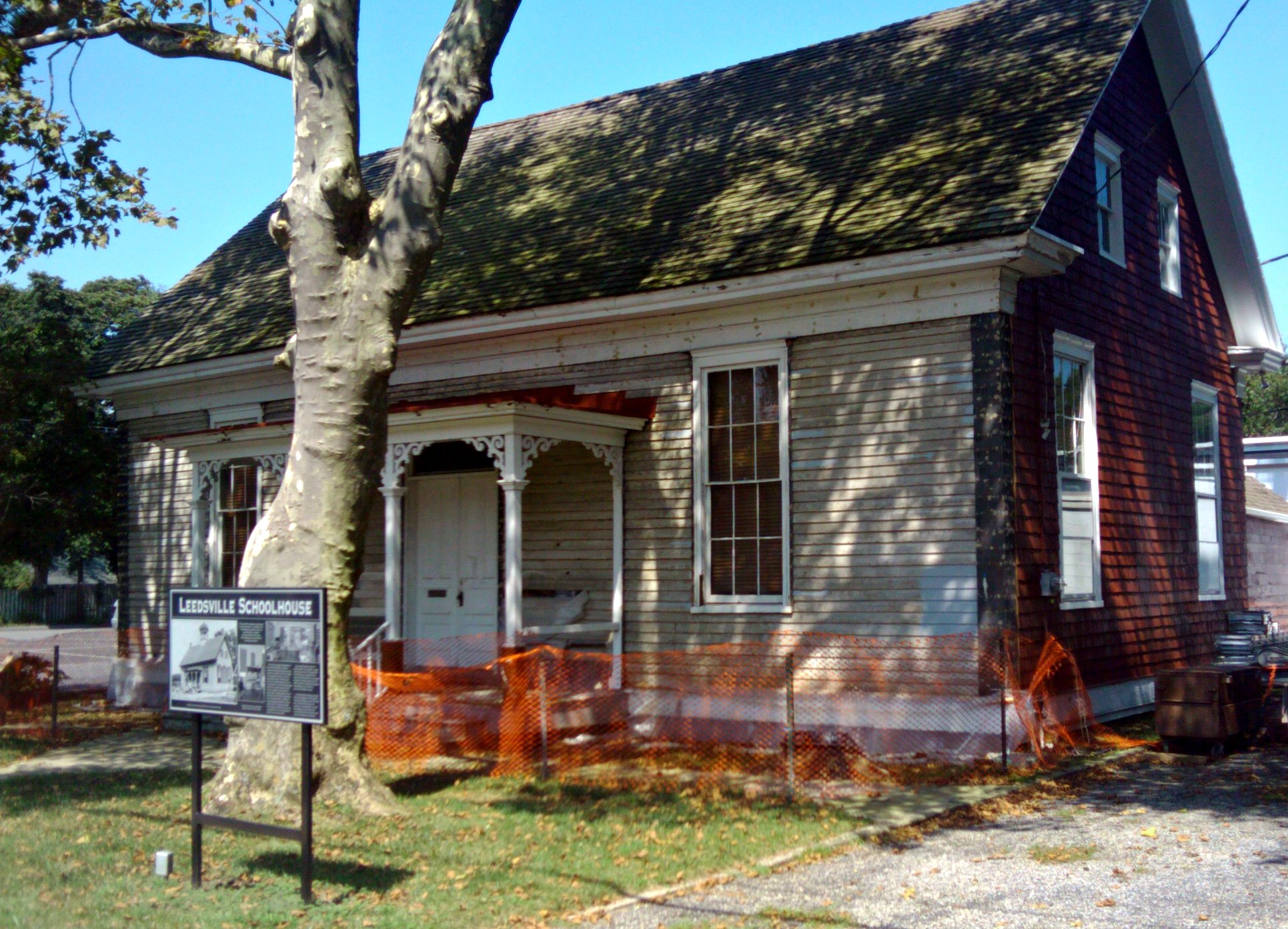
- Leedsville Schoolhouse

- Location within Atlantic County, New Jersey Location within New Jersey Location within the United States
- Location: 16 West Poplar Avenue, Linwood, New Jersey
- Coordinates: 39°21′03″N 74°34′04″W
- Area: 1 acre (0.40 ha)
- Built: 1873
- Architectural style: Late Victorian, Vernacular Victorian
- NRHP reference No.: 84000510
- NJRHP No.: 346

Significant dates
- Added to NRHP: December 20, 1984
- Designated NJRHP: November 1, 1984

Linwood Borough School No. 1, also known as the Leedsville Schoolhouse, is a former one-room schoolhouse built in 1873 and located at 16 West Poplar Avenue in the city of Linwood in Atlantic County, New Jersey. It was added to the National Register of Historic Places on December 20, 1984 for its significance in architecture and education. The Linwood Historical Society now uses the building as a museum.

== History ==
The community was known as Leedsville until 1880. The first school was built c. 1800, a log Quaker Meeting House. The second was built 1843 and known as the Leeds Ville Academy. The third and current building was built in 1873. It was used as an elementary school from 1873 to 1908. It later served as the Linwood municipal hall until 1965, when it was converted for use as the city library.

== See also ==
- National Register of Historic Places listings in Atlantic County, New Jersey
- List of museums in New Jersey
