= Rachel Alana Handler =

American actress

- Born: Philadelphia, PA, US
- Other name: Rachel Handler
- Occupation: Actress / Singer / Motivational Speaker
- Years active: 2007–present
- Website: http://www.rachelahandler.com

Rachel Alana Handler is an American actress, singer and motivational speaker who is best known for playing Chunks in the 2016 horror movie Smothered.

== Early life ==
Handler was born in Philadelphia, Pennsylvania. Raised in Linwood, New Jersey, she is a graduate of Mainland Regional High School. She holds a Bachelor of Music degree in Vocal Performance from the Westminster Choir College. In her early career she performed with Kelli O'Hara at Carnegie Hall in “The Best of Lerner and Loewe” and had made appearances in Off-Broadway and Off-Off-Broadway theatrical productions.

She completed months of rehabilitation after a car accident, now walks with prosthesis and has become an advocate for actors with disabilities.

== Career ==
In 2015, she was honored as part of Atlantic City Weekly's "Top 40 Under 40" Handler's contributions and interviews on her personal experiences and inclusion of disabled actors in the arts have been featured on Disabled World, Little Bits of Good, and Backstage.com. Her recent article "Stop Excluding Actors With Disabilities" was posted to the front page of Backstage.

Her acting credits include an episode of Law & Order: Special Victims Unit, an episode of Blue Bloods, as "Denise Todd" (uncredited) in Elementary, and starring in the Christa Wells video "Shine". Her appearance as Chunks in Smothered has been well received by the horror community. She has starred in independent films, including Disabilidates, a short film in which she played an amputee going on a first date, Two and Twenty Troubles and Only Those Who Limp Allowed. Her theater credits include Tess Samuels in "The Bipartisan" at the Thespis Theatre Festival, Resident Actor in "The Bats" at The Flea Theater and Hannah in Measure for Measure at Frog and Peach Theatre Co. Handler also appeared in Nicu's Spoon Theater Company's production of Richard III as Lady Anne. Handler also wrote and starred in Inspiration Whore, a one woman show in which Handler, fresh from her accident and recovery, constantly hears people tell her that she is an "inspiration" and works through her conflicted feelings on the topic, ultimately finding the "inspiring spark" inside herself. In 2016 she created an Angie Tribeca spin-off and parody created and written by Handler titled Becky Nolita which features actors with disabilities.

In 2017, Handler filmed a supporting role in the film The Upside, starring Bryan Cranston and Kevin Hart. Handler was also profiled in a March 2017 broadcast of Chasing News titled "Dancing Her Heart Out". She is currently working on a screenplay loosely based on her life, as well as filming guest starring roles in Goliath and NCIS: New Orleans. Her appearance in NCIS: New Orleans was met with praise from the online publication The Mighty: "I kept expecting the character’s disability to suddenly become key to the story, but it never did. They didn’t fall into any of the stereotypes of disability we usually see on TV. They never went into detail about her amputation, and it was completely unrelated to why she was in danger. Although she did need to be rescued by the team, she was not depicted as more vulnerable because of her amputation. Nor was it mentioned as an added reason to find her — she needed help because she was a whistleblower trying to expose corruption, not because she had a disability." Handler is also a two time participant of the Easterseals (U.S.) Disability Film Challenge which gives filmmakers – with and without disabilities – the opportunity to collaborate and tell unique stories that showcase disability in its many forms and support Easterseals’ goal to change the way the world defines and views disability, so everyone can reach his or her potential.

== Filmography ==
Year	Film	Role	Notes
2001	Shufflemania	Young Girl	
2013	Elementary	Denise Todd	"On the Line" (uncredited)
2014	Disabilidates	Rachel	Best Actor Award
2014	Two and Twenty Troubles	Rachel	Self
2015	Blue Bloods	Veteran	"Baggage"
2015	Getting it Wrong	Rachel	
2016	Law & Order: Special Victims Unit	Jury Foreperson	"Star-Struck Victims"
2016	Smothered	Chunks	
2016	Becky Nolita	Becky Nolita	
2017	The Housewarming	Alli	Hollywood Hills Awards Winner for Best Comedian
2017	The Upside	Proctor	
2018	NCIS: New Orleans	Molly Lindell	"Empathy"
2018	Goliath	Flor	Episode #2.4
2018	New Amsterdam	Circulating Nurse	"Righteous Right Hand" and "Your Turn"
2021	So You Wanna Be An Actor	Addy	
2018	Andy & Kaliope	Jamie	
2018	Best Foot Forward	Maria	Halloween
2022	Interview with the Vampire	Peg Leg Doris	"In Throes of Increasing Wonder" and "After the Phantoms of Your Former Self"
