= Witz (novel) =

Novel by Joshua Cohen

- First edition cover
- Author: Joshua Cohen
- Illustrator: Nicholas Motte
- Cover artist: Danielle Dutton
- Language: English
- Publisher: Dalkey Archive Press
- Publication date: May 11, 2010
- Publication place: United States
- Media type: Print (paperback)
- Pages: 824 pp
- ISBN: 978-1-56478-588-6
- Dewey Decimal: 813/.54 22
- LC Class: PS3553.O42434W58 2010

Witz is a novel by Joshua Cohen.

== Plot summary ==
In Witz, Joshua Cohen calls all religious Jews "Affiliated". After the sabbath meal a week before Christmas, Benjamin is born to Israel and Hanna Israelien in Joysey, the first son after 12 girls. This winter is particularly hard and in fact persists year round. Benjamin is born full grown (by a method explored by Flann O'Brien in At Swim-Two-Birds), with a beard and glasses. His foreskin continually sheds itself and grows back. Already too big for his father's shirts, he takes to his mother's maternity robes. On Christmas Eve, all of the Affiliated die except first-born sons. The Israelien's maid, Wanda, drives Benjamin down to Florida to live with his grandfather, Isaac, who is Unaffiliated. Meanwhile, a cabal of government operatives are quarantining all of the first-borns on Ellis Island, now called "The Garden" (incorporated), capitalized with the property of the dead. A week later, they come for Benjamin. Isaac dies from a heart attack. Benjamin escapes at a rest stop but is eventually caught and taken to The Garden, where they have moved the entire Israelien house, complete with Sabbath guest still on one of the toilets. The Garden markets Benjamin as the messiah, complete with travelling road show and merchandising. A team of unaffiliated women are trained to act as his mother and sisters and see to his needs.

Then the first-borns start dying, and by Passover Benjamin is the only one remaining. It is arranged that he marry the President's daughter in Las Vegas, but Benjamin escapes again, to wander the country in his mother's robe. Back in New York City, his "sisters" catch up with him, and during cunnilingus with "Hanna", his tongue gets stuck and is torn off when the sisters try to separate them. The scandal destroys The Garden, and Benjamin is shunned by all (he and the operators of The Garden are Disaffiliated).

Without real Jews around to complicate things, America, and soon, the world, has become Affiliated. The President becomes chief of the Sanhedrin in Jerusalem. Those who refuse to Affiliate are sent to their "homeland", Polandland, where they are kept in ghettos, experimented upon, worked and starved to death, killed. Benjamin finds his way there, too, visiting the towns of his mother's and his father's ancestors. In his wanderings, he sprouts the horns of a cow and ultimately he turns into a woman. The Affiliated, however, revive the cult of his tongue, now displayed as a relic. And Wanda, now Affiliated, with a son of her own, remembers the visitor who came down the chimney to sit with Benjamin every night for the week after his birth: Isaiah? dressed as Santa Claus.

Twenty-five years later, we hear from a 108-year-old Jewish man who was in Auschwitz ... He has listed the punch line of a joke, who needs the setup any more, for every year that he has lived. Because what should you do only laugh.

== Critical reception ==
The New York Observer stated: "Witz . . . "[is] the sort of postmodern epic that arrives like a comet about once every decade, like Infinite Jest or Gravity's Rainbow. Like any epic, it defies summary and overflows with puns, allusions, digressions, authorial sleights of hand and structural gags-in the tradition of Thomas Pynchon, James Joyce, Jonathan Swift and Laurence Sterne."
