= Permanent Record (autobiography) =

Book by Edward Snowden

- First edition cover
- Author: Edward Snowden
- Audio read by: Holter Graham
- Cover artist: Platon (photo); Rodrigo Corral (design)
- Language: English
- Subjects: Global surveillance; autobiography
- Publisher: Metropolitan Books
- Publication date: September 17, 2019
- Publication place: United States
- Media type: Print (hardcover and paperback), e-book
- Pages: 352
- ISBN: 978-1-250-23723-1
- OCLC: 1114558657
- Dewey Decimal: 327.12730092 B 23
- LC Class: JF1525.W45 S655 2019

Permanent Record is a 2019 autobiography by Edward Snowden, whose revelations sparked a global debate about surveillance. It was published on September 17, 2019 (Constitution Day), by Metropolitan Books, an imprint of Henry Holt and Company. The book describes Snowden's childhood as well as his tenure at the Central Intelligence Agency and National Security Agency and his motivations for the leaking of highly classified information in 2013 that revealed global surveillance programs. Snowden also discusses his views on authoritarianism, democracy, and privacy. The writer Joshua Cohen is credited by Snowden for "helping to transform my rambling reminiscences and capsule manifestoes into a book."

Upon release, Permanent Record has received mixed-to-positive reviews by critics, while the United States filed a lawsuit against Snowden for alleged violations of non-disclosure agreements with the CIA and NSA. The lawsuit did not aim to restrict the book's content or distribution, but to capture the proceeds Snowden earns from it. In December 2019, U.S. District Judge Liam O'Grady ruled in favor of the U.S. government. Permanent Record has been censored in China, with the removed content including comments about authoritarian states, privacy-supporting technologies, and the right to privacy.

== Summary ==
=== Part One ===
Snowden recounts growing up in a patriotic military family in Elizabeth City, North Carolina and moving to Crofton, Maryland, just shy of his ninth birthday. In Crofton, his father worked as a chief warrant officer in the Aeronautical Engineering Division at Coast Guard Headquarters and his mother at the National Security Agency (NSA). He was introduced to computers by his father, using his Commodore 64 home computer. From around the age of twelve, he became obsessed with the internet, using a dial-up Internet access and trying to spend his "every waking moment" online. He eventually learned computer programming and became a hacker as a teenager, taking his focus away from his schoolwork to the detriment of his grades. He recalls one instance of discovering a security flaw on the website of the Los Alamos National Laboratory. He called the lab to notify them of this and later received a call from a man thanking him and offering a job once he turned 18.

Toward the end of his freshman year at Arundel High School, Snowden's parents were getting divorced and sold their Crofton house. He moved into his mother's condo near Ellicott City. At the beginning of his sophomore year, he was unusually fatigued and was eventually diagnosed with infectious mononucleosis. He missed four months of classes, and was told he would have to repeat his sophomore year. Instead, he dropped out of Arundel High and enrolled at Anne Arundel Community College (AACC), taking classes two days a week. He also later passed the General Education Development (GED) exams at a high school near Baltimore, a promise he made to himself when he dropped out.

Snowden started freelancing as a web designer for a woman from his Japanese class at AACC. He wanted to advance his career further, taking a Microsoft certification course at the Computer Career Institute of a Johns Hopkins University satellite campus. In the aftermath of the September 11 attacks, Snowden joined the United States Army to show he wasn't "just a brain in a jar" and was on track to become a Special Forces sergeant through the 18X enlistment option but suffered stress fractures during training at Fort Benning in Georgia. Snowden says his greatest regret was his own "reflexive, unquestioning support" for the war on terror and the resulting "promulgation of secret policies, secret laws, secret courts and secret wars."

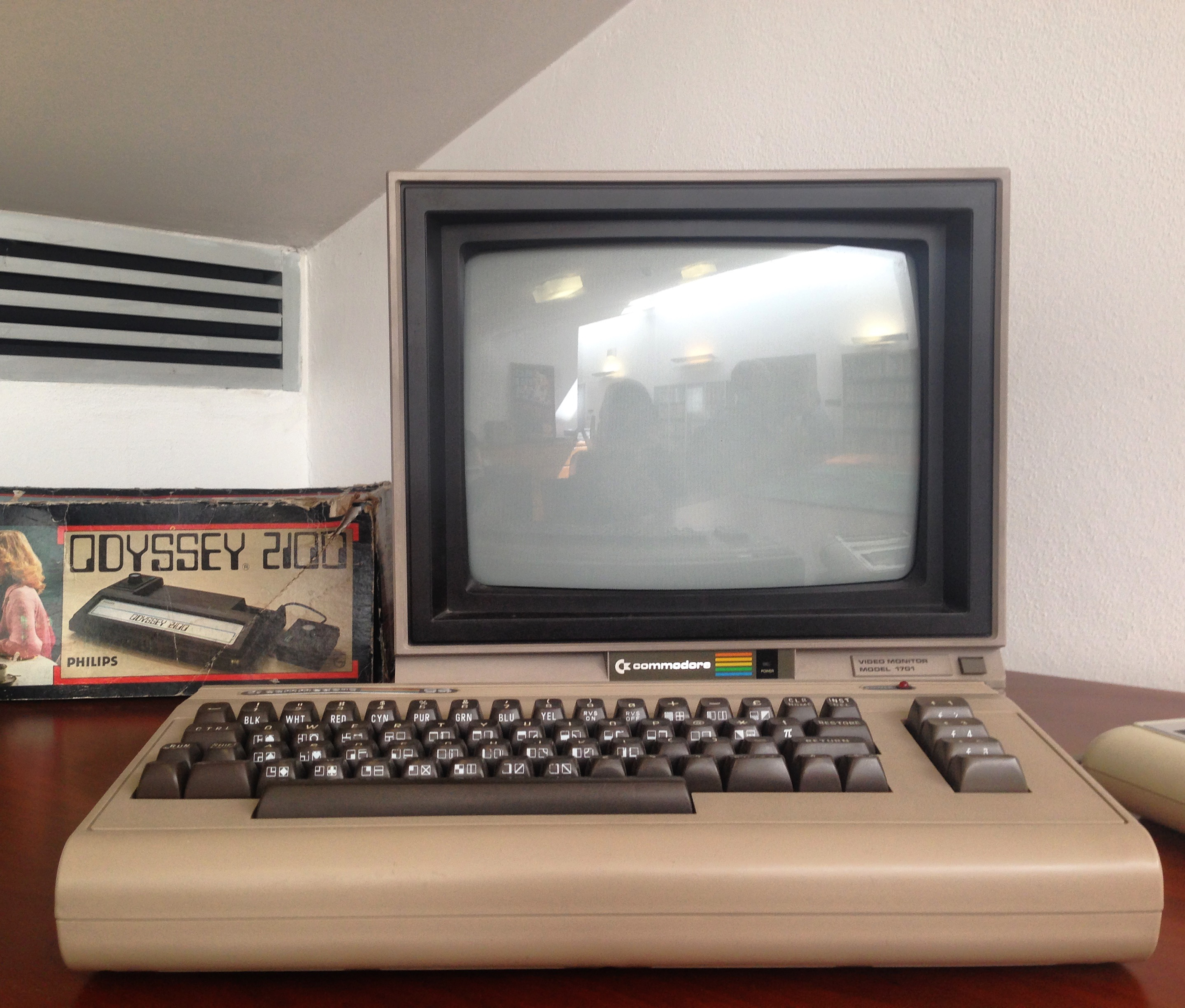
Snowden first became interested in computers by using his father's Commodore 64 home computer.

Snowden still wanted to serve his country and realized he had taken his talent for technology for granted, and began taking classes again at Anne Arundel Community College. Knowing he would need a high-level security clearance to work for an intelligence agency, he searched for jobs that would sponsor his application for the Single Scope Background Investigation. He became an employee at the University of Maryland's Center for Advanced Study of Language, a research center sponsored by the NSA. Around the same time, he met his then-girlfriend Lindsay Mills through the site Hot or Not. He eventually passed the full-scope polygraph and successfully attained the TS/SCI security clearance, completing his final interview at the NSA's Friendship Annex when he was twenty-two years old.

=== Part Two ===
After attending a 2006 job fair at the Ritz-Carlton in Tysons Corner, Virginia, Snowden accepted an offer for a position at the CIA and was assigned to the global communications division at the CIA headquarters in Langley, Virginia. In March 2007, the CIA stationed Snowden with diplomatic cover in Geneva, Switzerland, where he was responsible for maintaining computer-network security. In February 2009, Snowden resigned from the CIA.

Shortly after, Snowden took a job as contractor for the NSA in Japan, but was officially an employee of Perot Systems (which was acquired by Dell soon after his arrival). He worked at the NSA's Pacific Technical Center (PTC), at Yokota Air Base. His job there was "helping to connect the NSA's systems architecture with the CIA's." On one occasion, the PTC hosted a conference featuring briefings given by experts from all the intelligence components. The conference concerned how the Chinese intelligence services were targeting the U.S. Intelligence Community (IC) and how the IC could respond. When the only technology briefer was unable to attend at the last minute, Snowden was selected to replace them in assessing China's surveillance capabilities. He stayed up all night preparing his presentation, sifting through top secret reports off the NSA network and the CIA network.

He was stunned by the extent to which China was able to constantly collect, store, and analyze the billions of daily telephone and Internet communications of their over a billion citizenry. However, Snowden began to believe that it was impossible for the US to have so much information about what the Chinese were doing without having done some of the very same things itself. Snowden, however, admits that at the time he "tamped down" his unease and fully supported defensive and targeted surveillance. He was further suspicious when he, around the same time, read the Unclassified Report on the President's Surveillance Program. His suspicion drove him to search for the classified report, but was unable to find it. It was only later, long after he had forgotten about it, that the classified version mistakenly appeared on his desktop.

After reading the report, he says he spent months in a sad, low daze:

I felt more adult than ever, but also cursed with the knowledge that all of us had been reduced to something like children, who’d be forced to live the rest of our lives under omniscient parental supervision. I felt like a fraud, making excuses to Lindsay to explain my sullenness. I felt like a fool, as someone of supposedly serious technical skills who’d somehow helped to build an essential component of this system without realizing its purpose. I felt used, as an employee of the IC who only now was realizing that all along I’d been protecting not my country but the state. I felt, above all, violated.

Snowden moved to Columbia, Maryland in 2011, still working for Dell but now attached again to the CIA. He had switched to a sales position, a move which he describes as a way to distract himself from his unease and begin to have a normal life. However, the rise of cloud computing disturbed Snowden. He began expressing his concerns to Lindsay. Around the same time, Snowden began experiencing intense dizziness and, eventually, his first epileptic seizure. Following a series of seizures, Snowden took a short-term disability leave from Dell. The final chapter of Part Two, "On the Couch", describes his time spent recovering on his mother's blue couch as well his thoughts on authoritarian states and privacy in the context of the 2011 Arab Spring.

=== Part Three ===
In March 2012, he began working at "the Tunnel", a former aircraft factory turned NSA facility located under a pineapple field in Kunia, on the island of Oahu, Hawaii. He was working on a Dell contract for the NSA. Snowden moved to Hawaii for the more relaxed lifestyle and the less stressful duties of his new position, in an effort to lessen the triggers of his seizures. He was the sole employee of the Office of Information Sharing, where he worked as a SharePoint systems administrator. He began actively searching for the NSA's surveillance capabilities and abuses at this time. As part of his work, Snowden developed a system called Heartbeat which created an automated queue from the classified documents posted to the Intelligence Community's "readboards". Heartbeat would perpetually scan for new and unique documents and create a kind of aggregated newsfeed personalized for each employee, based on their interests and their security clearance. Heartbeat was highly comprehensive, accessing beyond the NSA's network into the networks of the CIA and the FBI as well as into the Department of Defense's top-secret Joint Worldwide Intelligence Communications System. Heartbeat's servers stored a copy of each scanned document, allowing Snowden to "perform the kind of deep interagency searches that the heads of most agencies could only dream of." Snowden says that nearly all of the documents that he later leaked to journalists were received through Heartbeat.

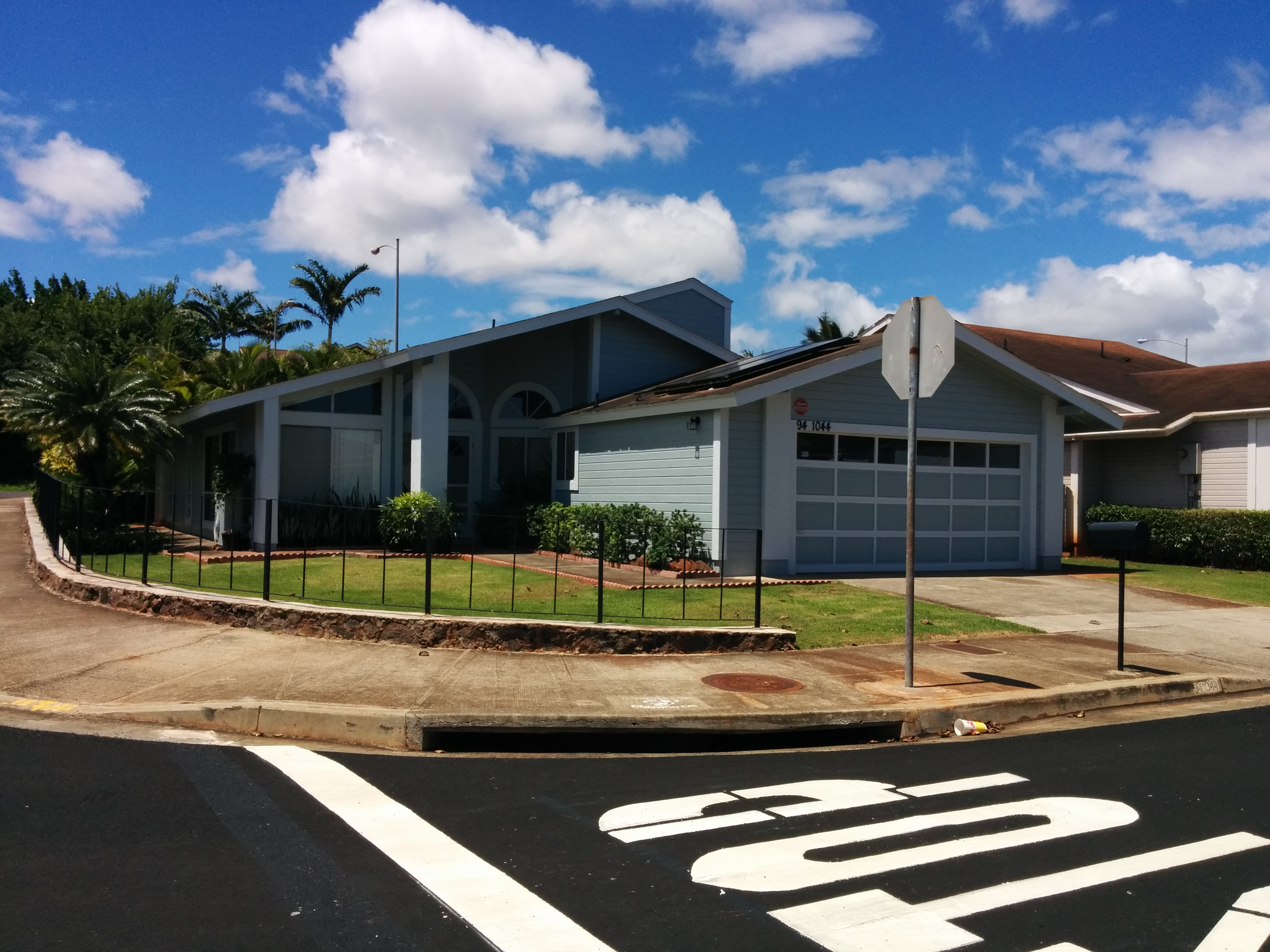
Edward Snowden's former house in Waipahu, Hawaii.

In "Whistleblowing", Snowden discusses the Constitution of the United States and argues that the Intelligence Community have "hacked" it by acting with impunity from the executive branch, the legislative branch, and the judiciary branch. He also discusses the history of whistleblowing and argues that the terms "leaking" and "whistleblowing" should not be used interchangeably because he believes "leaking" is done out of self-interest, not out of public interest.

When Snowden decided to go public, he realized he would have to have documentation or he risked being doubted. He chose not to self-publish to avoid being "lost among the crazy" of people posting classified secrets to the Internet every day. He avoided WikiLeaks because he felt their new strategy of publishing leaks as they received them would be no different to him self-publishing. He felt a document dump was not appropriate as his leaks were too "tangled and technical". He considered The New York Times but was unimpressed with how Bill Keller intentionally delayed the reporting of the Terrorist Surveillance Program until after George W. Bush's 2004 reelection. He chose a number of journalists to contact, primarily messaging documentarian Laura Poitras and journalist Glenn Greenwald. He communicated with them over e-mail under the aliases "Cincinnatus", "Citizenfour" and "Verax". To stay anonymous, he went war-driving, exploiting local Wi-Fi networks with an antenna and magnetic GPS sensor while driving in his car around Oahu. He used Tor and the Kismet mapping software, running on the Tails operating system which allowed him to easily spoof his laptop's MAC address.

Under the guise of compatibility testing, Snowden transferred documents from the Heartbeat server to outdated desktop Dell PCs from his office, then onto SD cards after deduplicating, compressing and encrypting them. He carried the SD cards out through security, hiding them inside a Rubik's Cube, in his sock, in his cheek, and in his pocket. At home, he transferred them onto a single external drive which he left out in the open on his desk.

He left Dell on March 15, 2013, and began working as an "infrastructure analyst" at the National Threat Operations Center (NTOC) in Honolulu through a contractor job at Booz Allen Hamilton. The NTOC had access to XKEYSCORE. Snowden witnessed coworkers use XKEYSCORE to view information about their current and former lovers, called LOVEINT. He also recalls one time that affected him, watching a personal video of a father and his young son. Between March–May 2013, Snowden began rapidly preparing to leave the country, emptying his bank accounts and erasing and encrypting his old computers. He researched his safest and most conducive destination, narrowing it down to Hong Kong. The day after Lindsay left on a camping trip, Snowden took an emergency medical leave of absence from work, citing epilepsy. He brought four laptops with him: one for secure communications, one for normal communications, a decoy, and a laptop that had never connected to any networks and would never be used to do so. He flew to Tokyo then to Hong Kong on May 20, 2013, paying in cash both times.

He stayed in The Mira Hong Kong hotel, where Glenn Greenwald and Laura Poitras met him on June 2, 2013. Between June 3 and 9 in Snowden's hotel room, Greenwald and his Guardian colleague Ewen MacAskill interviewed Snowden, with Poitras filming what later featured in her Academy Award-winning documentary Citizenfour (2014). On June 5, The Guardian published Greenwald's first story, on the FISA court warrant that ordered Verizon to provide a daily feed to the NSA containing "telephony metadata". On June 6, The Guardian published Greenwald's revelation of PRISM and The Washington Post published Poitras and Barton Gellman's story on PRISM on June 7. Snowden's identity was revealed on June 9 through a video interview directed by Poitras published on The Guardian's website. The U.S. government charged Snowden under the Espionage Act on June 14 and formally requested his extradition on June 21, Snowden's 30th birthday.

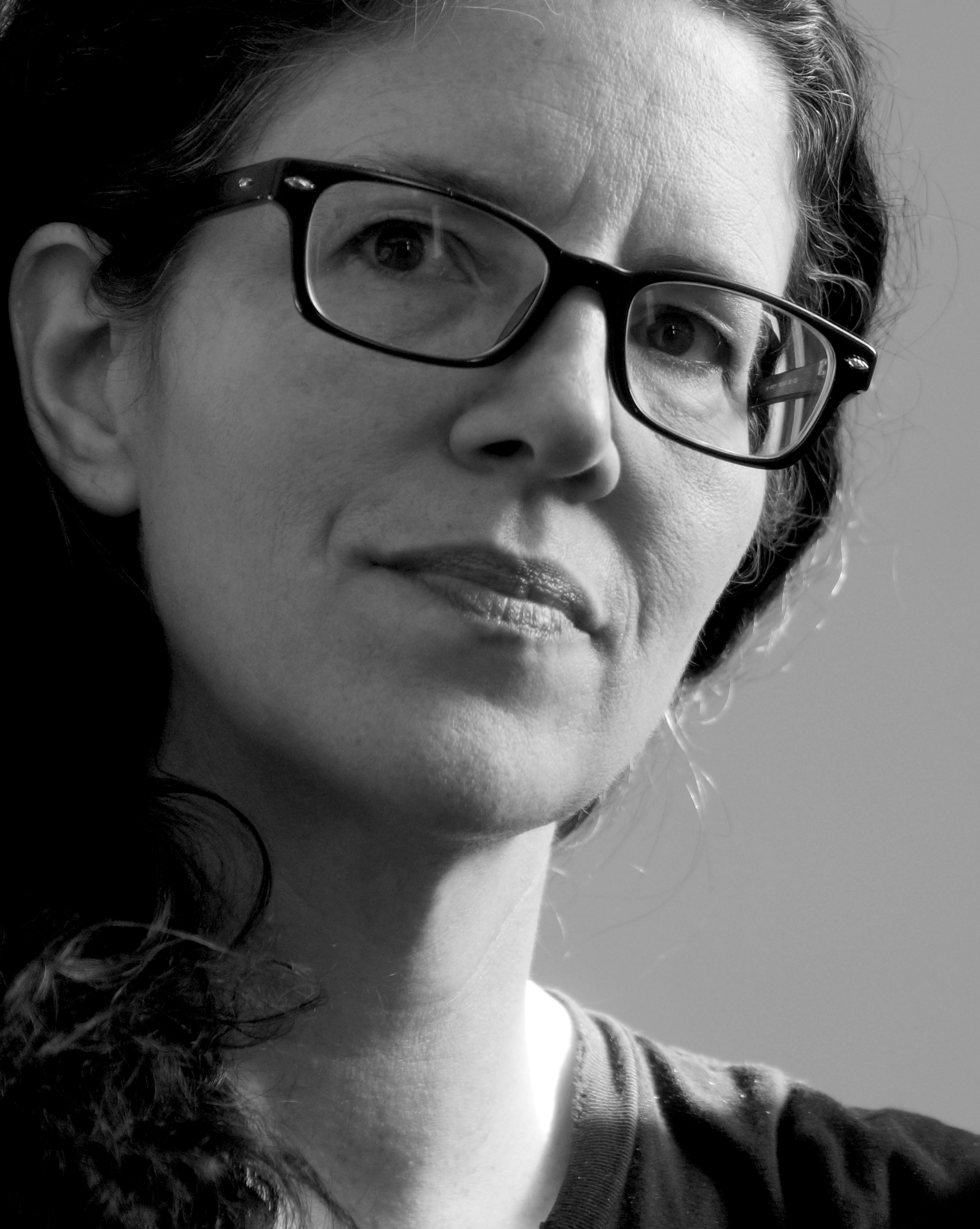
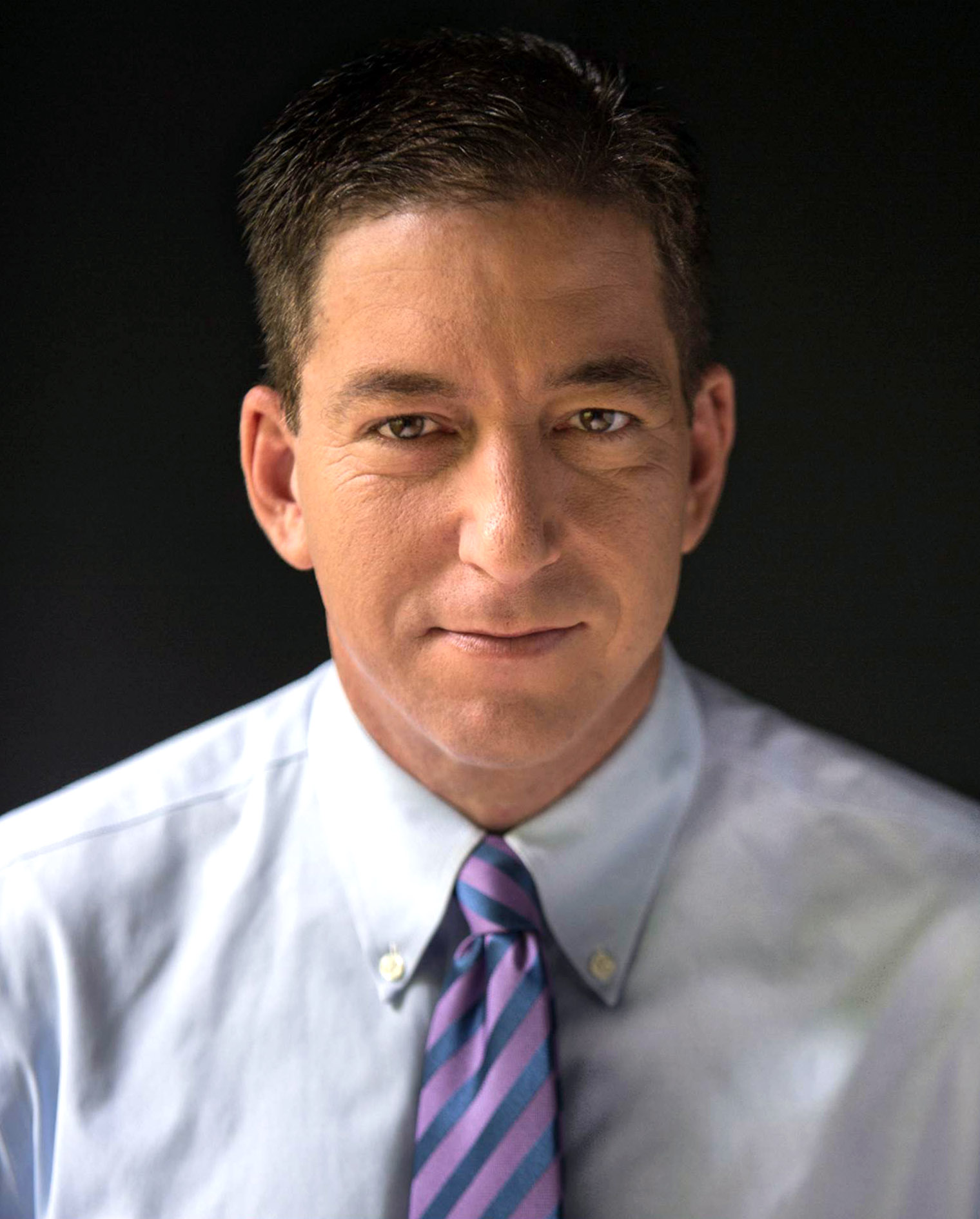
Laura Poitras (left) and Glenn Greenwald (right) were both contacted by Edward Snowden anonymously over encrypted email.

Accompanied by Sarah Harrison of WikiLeaks, Snowden attempted to travel to Ecuador for political asylum. They planned to fly to Moscow, then to Havana, then to Caracas, then to Quito, Ecuador because they were unable to fly directly from Hong Kong and all of the other connecting flights traveled through United States airspace. They arrived at Moscow's Sheremetyevo International Airport on June 23, but were taken aside and questioned by a man from Russia's Federal Security Service (FSB). The man asked Snowden to work for them, but Snowden rejected the offer and said he had no intention to stay in Russia. The man was surprised and informed Snowden that the U.S. State Department had canceled his passport. He proceeded to ask Snowden to share information with them but he refused. Snowden was detained in Sheremetyevo for forty days, during which he applied to twenty-seven countries for political asylum but none offered. On August 1, the Russian government granted Snowden temporary asylum.

The book's penultimate 28th chapter is composed of entries from Lindsay Mills's 2013 diary. Snowden explained that no one but her had the experience or the right to recount that period of her life: "the FBI interrogations, the surveillance, the press attention, the online harassment, the confusion and pain, the anger and sadness."

In the final chapter, "Love and Exile", Snowden expresses his feelings on the impact of his revelations, including ACLU v. Clapper and the EU's General Data Protection Regulation, and his hopes for the future of technology and privacy. He also discusses adjusting to life in Moscow with Lindsay. In the chapter's final sentence, Snowden reveals he and Lindsay were married in 2017.

== Publication ==
The book was published on September 17, 2019, by Metropolitan Books, an imprint of Henry Holt and Company. It was purposely published on September 17 to coincide with Constitution Day, which Snowden discusses in the book.

=== Civil lawsuit ===
On September 17, 2019, the Federal Government of the United States filed a lawsuit in the District Court for the Eastern District of Virginia against Snowden for alleged violations of non-disclosure agreements with the CIA and NSA. The complaint alleges that Snowden violated prepublication obligations related to the publication of his memoir Permanent Record. The complaint lists the publishers Macmillan and Holtzbrink as relief defendants. The government stated that its lawsuit "does not seek to stop or restrict the publication or distribution" of the book, but instead aims to capture the proceeds Snowden would be earning from it. In December 2019, Judge Liam O'Grady concurred with the plaintiff.

Snowden refused during the civil lawsuit to produce documents showing how much he was paid. As a result, federal prosecutors sought sanctions against Snowden. On August 7, 2020, U.S. Magistrate Judge Theresa Buchanan agreed to impose sanctions on Snowden, ruling that he "unequivocally acted in bad faith".

Snowden himself referred to the lawsuit on an episode of The Daily Show, stating it was largely responsible for the book's increased sales via the Streisand effect.

=== Censorship ===
On November 11, 2019, Snowden posted on his Twitter that the simplified Chinese edition of Permanent Record, published in mainland China, had been censored. Parts of the book were removed, in violation of his publishing agreement. The Chinese version removed Snowden's observation on the motivations of Arab Spring protestors: "The crowds were calling for an end to oppression, censorship, and precarity. They were declaring that in a truly just society, the people were not answerable to the government, the government was answerable to the people." The following section, in which Snowden comments on the nature of authoritarian states, was also largely censored. In the section, Snowden writes, "Authoritarian states are typically not governments of laws, but governments of leaders, who demand loyalty from their subjects and are hostile to dissent." The Chinese version also censored Snowden's references to the Tor anonymity network, China's military cyber intelligence and its capabilities, China's Great Firewall, as well Snowden's characterization of Hong Kong as having "nominal autonomy". The Chinese version censored topics not directly related to China as well, including Snowden's commentary on the right to privacy. Snowden invited his Twitter followers to help him create a "correct and unabridged version" of Permanent Record in Chinese to be published freely online.

== Reception ==
The book debuted at number two on The New York Times nonfiction best-seller list for the week ending September 21, 2019. On the day it was released, Permanent Record reached number one on Amazon's bestseller list.

Kirkus Reviews wrote, "Snowden's book likely won't change the minds of his detractors, but he makes a strong case for his efforts." Greg Myre of NPR wrote, "Snowden has no new bombshells in his book. But he offers a very readable memoir about growing up with the Internet, a detailed rationale for his actions, and a look at how government surveillance has evolved since his disclosures." Jill Lepore of The New Yorker wrote, "Some people write memoirs; other people craft legends. Snowden, who once aspired to be a model and is in some quarters regarded as a modern messiah, is the second kind."

Publishers Weekly felt the book lacked a strong case for the argument that NSA surveillance "leads inevitably to oppressive control" but concluded, "Still, Snowden's many admirers will find his saga both captivating and inspiring." Greg Miller of The Washington Post praised Snowden's "lucid and compelling language" concerning the architecture of the surveillance networks he exposed but felt the memoir was lessened by withholding "any truly revealing material about his own life" and lamented its lack of details on Snowden's experience in Russia and any regrets he may have. The Economist called the book "well-written, frequently funny" but concluded, "Whatever his relationship with the Russian authorities, and whenever it began, everything he says in Permanent Record—about himself, and about America—must be seen through the prism of his dependence on the Kremlin."
