= Smothered (2016 film) =

John Schneider's Smothered
- Theatrical release poster
- Directed by: John Schneider
- Written by: John Schneider
- Starring: Kane Hodder; R. A. Mihailoff; Bill Moseley
- Cinematography: Thomas L. Callaway
- Edited by: Joe Pascual
- Music by: Silas Hite
- Production company: John Schneider's Fairlight Films
- Release date: March 29, 2016
- Running time: 96 minutes
- Country: United States
- Language: English
- Budget: $1.1 million

Smothered is a 2016 horror comedy directed and written by John Schneider. The film stars Kane Hodder, Bill Moseley, R. A. Mihailoff, Malcolm Danare, and Don Shanks as several horror icons that find themselves the focus of a murderous hunt.

== Synopsis ==
After a convention appearance gig turns out to be wildly unsuccessful and unpleasant, a group of cult horror icons find themselves reluctantly persuaded to haunt a trailer park. Lured by the promise of $1,000 apiece for what should be relatively easy work, the group arrives at the park but soon discovers that there is more to the job than they had initially been led to believe and that their own lives are at risk.

== Cast ==
- Kane Hodder as Striper
- R. A. Mihailoff as himself
- Bill Moseley as Soggy Christian
- Dane Rhodes as Randy
- Malcolm Danare as himself
- Don Shanks as himself
- Rachel Alana Handler as Chunks
- Amy Brassette as Agness
- Ritchie Montgomery as Mountain Man
- Brea Grant as DeeDee
- John Schneider as Player
- Michael Berryman as himself
- John Kassir as himself
- Andrew Bowen as Carl
- Shanna Forrestall as Trixie

== Production ==
Filming mostly took place on Schneider's John Schneider Studios lot in Louisiana and additional scenes were shot in downtown Baton Rouge during summer 2013. For casting Schneider had a table read in Baton Rouge and cast Shanna Forrestall and Dane Rhodes based on their performances at the read. He had initially intended for Roddy Piper to perform in the film and after Piper was unable to take part in Smothered, Schneider re-wrote and renamed Piper's role for Rhodes. While writing the script Schneider changed the name of Moseley's character several times before choosing "Soggy Christian" and also added in that Moseley's character was a recovering alcoholic, which Moseley greatly enjoyed.

== Reception ==
Shock Till You Drop gave Smothered a positive review and remarked that it was "a fun film because it gives us a chance to see some of our horror heroes in a different light."
