= Book of Numbers (novel) =

Book by Joshua Cohen

- First edition cover
- Author: Joshua Cohen
- Language: English
- Publisher: Random House
- Publication date: 2015
- Publication place: United States
- Media type: Print (hardback & paperback)
- Pages: 592
- ISBN: 978-0-8129-9691-3
- Dewey Decimal: 813/.54
- LC Class: PS3553.O42434 B66 2015

Book of Numbers, published in 2015, is a metafiction novel written by author Joshua Cohen. The novel is about a writer named Joshua Cohen who is contracted to ghostwrite the autobiography of a tech billionaire called Joshua Cohen. It was published by Random House, and released in 2015.

== Development and style ==
Cohen read numerous books and treatises about the Internet's history and studied the biographies of technologists before and during the writing of the book.

The novel is divided into three sections. The first and third section are narrated by the ghost writer in a relatively traditional first-person style. The second section consists of interviews and a memoir-in-progress, and includes a number of unusual stylistic features like crossed-out text.

The novel loosely follows the structure of the biblical book for which it is named, and each character in the biblical book corresponds to a character in the novel.

== Reception ==
The novel received mostly positive reviews ranging from high praise to expressions of pure contempt. Among the first are comparisons of Cohen's writing to that of Philip Roth, Thomas Pynchon, and David Foster Wallace. The other extreme is exemplified by Robert Gottlieb, the writer and former editor-in-chief of Knopf, who called the novel an "overstuffed and pretentious monument to (or of?) narcissism."

In Tablet Magazine, literary critic Adam Kirsch wrote, "Like Pynchon and Wallace, Cohen can write with tireless virtuosity about absolutely everything," stating that, "Joshua Cohen is the Great American novelist." In The New York Times, book critic Dwight Garner wrote that the similarities with Roth come from "[blending] slashing comedy with a brooding awareness of family, of the Old World, of prior claims on his soul" and called the book "a wheeling meditation on the wired life, on privacy, on what being human in the age of binary code might mean," claiming the book is "more impressive than all but a few novels published so far this decade."

Several critics noted that Book of Numbers was one of the first literary novels to take the Internet as its subject matter and to grapple with online life, digital surveillance, and with how the Internet has changed culture and society in both positive and negative ways. Referring to Book of Numbers, writer Kyle Chayka said in Rolling Stone, "The Great American Internet Novel is here," calling the book "one of the best novels ever written about the Internet." The New York Times Book Review described the novel as “a digital-age Ulysses.” In The Wall Street Journal, book critic Sam Sacks wrote, "Cohen's deeply rewarding novel is about an online religion gone wrong—and its importance lies in the fact that nearly all of us in the modernized world are members of that faith, whether we know it or not." Bookforum noted, "Other recent literary novels have treated the dot-com-mania reboot, its flagship companies, and their 'disruptive' technologies—Pynchon’s Bleeding Edge, Dave Eggers’s The Circle—but Cohen’s is the best, at least for the time being. As the press notes (for once) correctly emphasize, Cohen is the perfect age to write such a book, having lived approximately an even number of years on either side of the pre-Web/post-Web divide."

Summarizing the critical response to the book and the development of the concept of the "Internet Novel," Jonathon Sturgeon noted, "Book of Numbers has been called both ‘the Great Internet Novel’ and ‘the Great American Novel.’ The book, published by Cohen at the age of thirty-four, succeeds at doing to the Internet what David Foster Wallace’s Infinite Jest—also published when its author was thirty-four—attempted to do to television. It humanizes it.” In 2021, literary critic Becca Rothfeld wrote further about the evolution of the Internet Novel, comparing Patricia Lockwood's No One is Talking About This favorably with Cohen's Book of Numbers and with William Gibson's novels.

A number of contemporary novelists echoed this critical praise, including Nell Zink and Francine Prose. The Irish novelist Colm Tóibín described Book of Numbers as, "A hugely ambitious novel set in the high-tech world of now. It is a verbal high-wire act, daring in its tones and textures: clever, poetic, fast-moving, deeply playful, filled with jokes, savvy about machines, wise about people, dazzling and engrossing."

Negative critiques often mentioned the books length and a perceived lack of substance justifying it. In the London Review of Books, Adam Mars-Jones wrote, "There are wonderful things here cloaked with an invisibility spell, tucked away in the middle of the book, where only the stubbornest seeker after enchantment will find them." In the Guardian, Steven Poole wrote, "An editor who had the time might have found the decent shorter novel buried somewhere within these pages."

In an interview with the Los Angeles Review of Books, Harold Bloom, who had dedicated the final essay on fiction of his career to the novel, expressed his admiration, "Call It Sleep by Henry Roth, Miss Lonelyhearts by Nathanael West, Sabbath’s Theater by Philip Roth, and quite possibly [Joshua Cohen's] Book of Numbers are the four best books by Jewish writers in America. Moving Kings is a strong and rather hurtful book, but that helps validate it. Book of Numbers, however, is shatteringly powerful. I cannot think of anything by anyone in [Cohen's] generation that is so frighteningly relevant and composed with such continuous eloquence. There are moments in it that seem to transcend our impasse."

Book of Numbers was a national bestseller and named one of "The 10 Best Books of 2015" by Vulture, one of the "Best Books of 2015" by the Wall Street Journal and NPR.

== Edward Snowden ==
Cohen wrote the novel before the Edward Snowden leaks, but the narrative anticipates several of the government initiatives revealed by Snowden.

In 2019, it was confirmed by The New Republic that Cohen assisted Snowden with the writing of Snowden's memoir, Permanent Record. In the acknowledgments of Permanent Record, Snowden thanks Cohen, writing, "Over the last nine months, Joshua Cohen has taken me to writing school, helping to transform my rambling reminiscences and capsule manifestos into a book that I hope he can be proud of."

Of the relationship between Cohen and Snowden, The New York Times wrote, "It’s like a recursive loop of life imitating art imitating life; in Cohen’s Book of Numbers, published in 2015, a novelist named Joshua Cohen is hired to ghostwrite the autobiography of a mysterious tech billionaire … whose search-engine company happens to be sharing information with government agencies."
