= Joshua Cohen (writer) =

American novelist and story writer

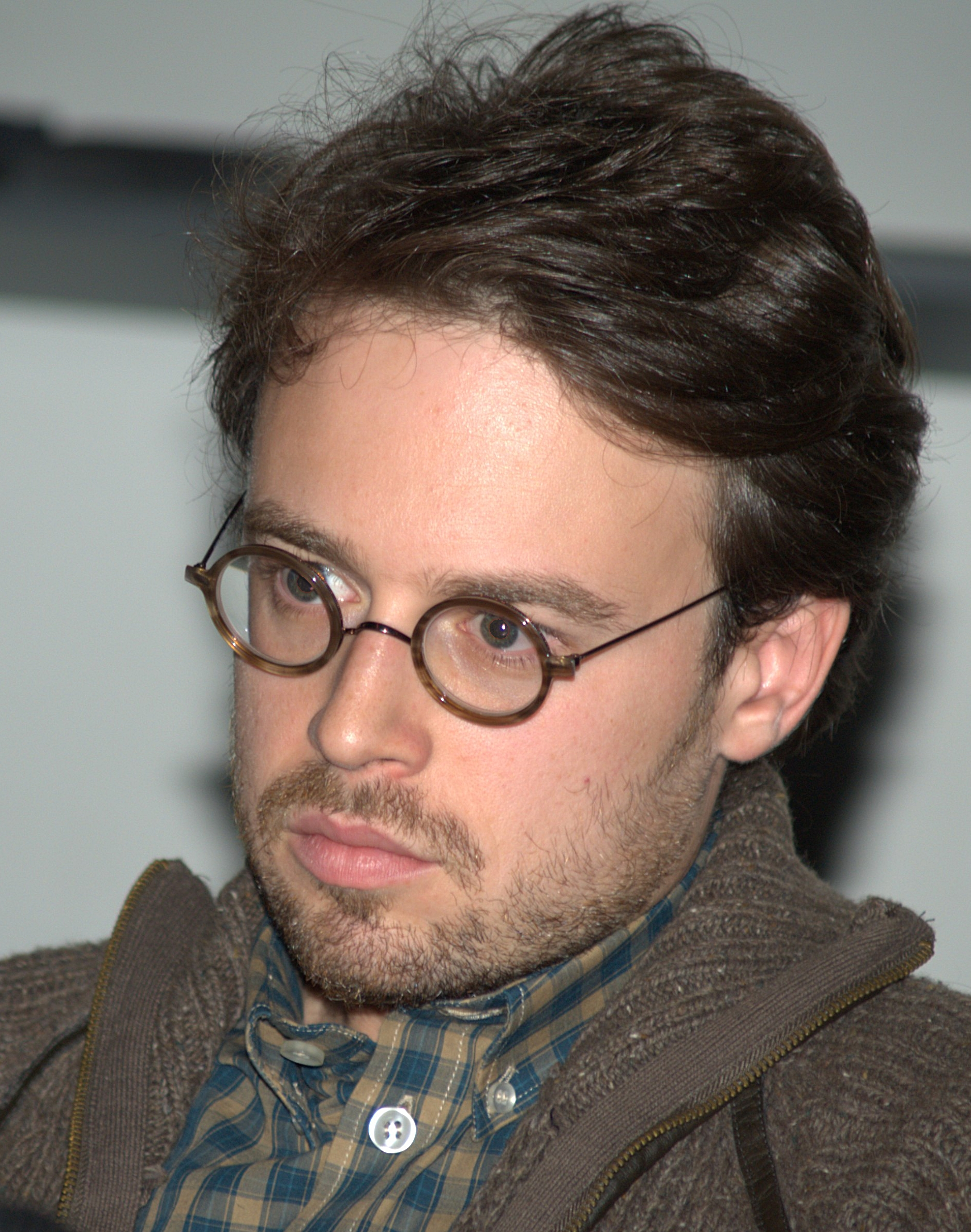
- Born: Joshua Aaron Cohen; September 6, 1980 (age 45); Somers Point, New Jersey, U.S.
- Education: Manhattan School of Music (BM)
- Occupations: Novelist, story writer
- Spouse: Lee Yaron
- Writing career
- Period: Contemporary
- Genres: Jewish, Literature, Speculative Fiction
- Website: joshuacohen.org

Joshua Aaron Cohen (born September 6, 1980) is an American novelist and story writer, best known for his works Witz (2010), Book of Numbers (2015), and Moving Kings (2017). Cohen won the 2022 Pulitzer Prize for Fiction for his novel The Netanyahus (2021).

== Life ==
Cohen grew up in Atlantic City, New Jersey, spent his summers in Cape May, New Jersey and went to school at Trocki Hebrew Academy before transferring to Mainland Regional High School. He lives in Red Hook, Brooklyn. He reads both German and Hebrew and has translated works in both languages into English. He is married to Israeli journalist Lee Yaron.

== Work and career ==
Cohen graduated from the Manhattan School of Music with a degree in music composition in 2001. He does not have an MFA, and has expressed disdain for the degree, but has taught the course "Long Century, Short Novels" at Columbia University's School of the Arts's MFA program. In 2017, Granta Magazine named him to its decennial list of the Best Young American Writers. Cohen lived in various cities in Eastern Europe between 2001 and 2006, working as a journalist.

Cohen's works have received acclaim. Witz was named a Best Book of 2010 by The Village Voice. Four New Messages was named a Best Book of 2012 by The New Yorker.

In an interview by Cohen for the Los Angeles Review of Books, Harold Bloom said, "Call It Sleep by Henry Roth, Miss Lonelyhearts by Nathanael West, Sabbath’s Theater by Philip Roth, and quite possibly your Book of Numbers are the four best books by Jewish writers in America. Your Moving Kings is a strong and rather hurtful book, but that helps validate it. Book of Numbers, however, is shatteringly powerful. I cannot think of anything by anyone in your generation that is so frighteningly relevant and composed with such continuous eloquence. There are moments in it that seem to transcend our impasse."

Cohen's essays have appeared in Harper's, The New York Times, The New Republic, The New York Times Book Review, Bookforum, The Jewish Daily Forward, Nextbook, Tablet Magazine, Triple Canopy (online magazine), Denver Quarterly, The Believer, The New York Observer, The London Review of Books, N+1 online, Guernica Magazine, and elsewhere.

In 2015, Cohen wrote PCKWCK, a live-written novel.

Cohen was involved with writing the memoir of Edward Snowden, Permanent Record. According to Snowden, Cohen "help[ed] to transform my rambling reminiscences and capsule manifestos into a book.” The New York Times wrote: "It’s like a recursive loop of life imitating art imitating life; in Cohen’s Book of Numbers, published in 2015, a novelist named Joshua Cohen is hired to ghostwrite the autobiography of a mysterious tech billionaire ... whose search-engine company happens to be sharing information with government agencies." The New Republic wrote: "Despite Macmillan’s black op to keep the book under wraps, over the past year, New York literary circles have buzzed with the news that novelist (and a contributor to The New Republic) Joshua Cohen had signed on as the famed whistle-blower’s literary interlocutor, traveling to Russia over the course of eight months to help Snowden, now 36, organize and improve his narrative."

The Netanyahus won the 2021 National Jewish Book Award for Fiction and the 2022 Pulitzer Prize for Fiction.

== Bibliography ==
=== Novels ===
- Cadenza for the Schneidermann Violin Concerto (2007)
- A Heaven of Others (2008)
- Witz (2010)
- Book of Numbers (2015)
- Moving Kings (2017)
- The Netanyahus (2021)
- Dead Herzls (2027)

=== Collections ===
- The Quorum (2005)
- Aleph-Bet: An Alphabet for the Perplexed (2007)
- Bridge & Tunnel (& Tunnel & Bridge) (2010)
- Four New Messages (2012)
- ATTENTION: Dispatches from a Land of Distraction (non-fiction, 2018)
- He: Shorter Writings of Franz Kafka (as editor, 2020)
- I Want to Keep Smashing Myself Until I'm Whole: An Elias Canetti Reader (as editor, 2022)

=== Stories ===
Date	Title	Publication	Collected in	Ref.
Feb 1 2011	Imaginary Appreciations of Myself as Hebrew Poet	Guernica Magazine	-	
Spring 2011	Emission	The Paris Review 196	Four New Messages	
Jul 2011	Cafédämmerung (or Allen in Prague, King of May Day, 1965)	The White Review 2	-	
2012	McDonald's	Triple Canopy 16	Four New Messages	
Jul 2012	The College Borough	Harper's (Jul 2012)	Four New Messages	
Jul 1 2012	Sent	Bomb Magazine 120	Four New Messages	
Dec 7 2012	Fat	Tablet	-	
Mar 3 2017	A Cinderella Story with an Immigrant Twist	The New Yorker	-	
Apr 25 2017	Uri	Granta 139	-	
May 3 2018	Mall Camp, Seasons 1 & 2	Granta 143	-	
October 13 2024	My Camp	The New Yorker	-	
