= Responses to the COVID-19 pandemic in November 2020 =

Aspect of viral disease pandemic

This article documents the chronology of the response to the COVID-19 pandemic in November 2020. Some developments may become known or fully understood only in retrospect. Reporting on this pandemic began in December 2019.

== Reactions and measures in Africa ==
Map of the WHO's regional offices and their respective operating regions. Africa; HQ: Brazzaville, Republic of the Congo Western Pacific; HQ: Manila, Philippines Eastern Mediterranean; HQ: Cairo, Egypt South East Asia; HQ: New Delhi, India Europe; HQ: Copenhagen, Denmark Americas; HQ: Washington, D.C., US

== Reactions and measures in Europe ==
=== 1 November ===
- England will enter a period of lockdown from 5 November to 2 December.

=== 2 November ===
- In Russia Edward Snowden and his wife Lindsay Mills are applying for dual Russian and American citizenship on behalf of their future son "in this age of pandemics and closed borders".

=== 4 November ===
- Italy will enforce different limitations for each region according to a color-coded map, as discussed by Giuseppe Conte, according to different factors, such as the mean Rt virus transmission ratio of each region. From 6 November until 3 December, red regions (Lombardy, Piedmont, Calabria, Sicily) will be restricted with a full lockdown (similarly to what happened during March 2020); orange and yellow regions will observe less restrictions (a so-called "mini-lockdown" or flexible lockdown).

=== 5 November ===
- The Danish government orders the culling of 17 million minks being grown for fur after a mutated strain of COVID-19 known as "cluster 5" was detected among minks. "Cluster 5" has infected at least twelve people. The Danish Government has justified on the cull in order to prevent a "restart" of the global pandemic.

== Reactions and measures in South and Southeast Asia ==
=== 5 November ===
- Malaysian Senior Minister Ismail Sabri Yaakob has announced that Malaysians living in areas under movement control order restrictions will not be allowed to cross borders during the upcoming Deepavali celebration on 14 November.

=== 7 November ===
- Malaysian Senior Minister Ismail Sabri Yaakob has announced that the Malaysian Government would be reinstating Conditional Movement Control Order restrictions throughout most states in peninsular Malaysia between 9 November and 6 December 2020. In addition, CMCO measures for Sabah, Selangor, Kuala Lumpur, and Putraya, which were scheduled to end on 9 November, were extended until 6 December. Under these CMCO measures, all educational institutions, social and cultural activities will be required to cease but economic activities can continue under set standard operating procedures.

=== 8 November ===
- The Malaysian Minister of Education Mohd Radzi Md Jidin has announced that all schools and school hostels in Malaysia will close between 9 November 2020 and 20 January 2021 in tandem with the renewed Conditional Movement Control Order restrictions coming into force on 9 November.

=== 9 November ===
- The Malaysian Government has extended Enhanced Movement Control Order restrictions over several areas in Sabah, Selangor, Negri Sembilan and Sarawak in response to a spike in cases nationwide.

=== 18 November ===
- Malaysian Minister of Science, Technology and Innovation Khairy Jamaluddin signed an agreement with Chinese Science and Technology Minister Wang Zhigang for Malaysia to be given priority access to COVID-19 vaccines developed in China.

=== 20 November ===
- Malaysian Senior Minister Ismail Sabri Yaakob has approved a domestic travel bubble programme within green zones. He also announced that conditional movement control order (CMCO) would end in the states of Johor, Kedah, Malacca, and Terengganu with the exception of some districts.

== Reactions and measures in the Western Pacific ==
=== 3 November ===
Air Commodore Darryn Webb has announced that New Zealand returnees will not be able to board flights to New Zealand without having pre-booked hotel vouchers for staying at a managed isolation and quarantine (MIQ) facility.

=== 9 November ===
After American Samoa had confirmed its first three cases resulting from maritime travel, authorities on neighbouring Samoa are investigating whether the three infected individuals had disembarked from their container ship Fesco Askold which had docked in Apia's port over the weekend.

=== 13 November ===
New Zealand's COVID-19 Response Minister Chris Hipkins confirmed that Auckland would remain at Alert Level 1 and that the city centre would reopen after a recent community transmission was genomically linked to an existing cluster. Hipkins also confirmed that he would seek Cabinet's permission to make it compulsory to wear masks on Auckland public transportation and flights.

=== 16 November ===
New Zealand Prime Minister Jacinda Ardern and COVID-19 Response Minister Chris Hipkins announced that face masks will be mandatory on public transportation in Auckland and on all domestic flights from 19 November.

=== 17 November ===
On 17 November, South Australian Premier Steven Marshall announced that the state would be entering a six-day "circuit breaker" lockdown following a local community outbreak. As a result, all schools, universities, eateries, and the construction industry will shut down while exercising outside of houses will be banned.

=== 19 November ===
The Bank of New Zealand has announced the closure of 38 branches nationwide over the next seven months as a result of the economic effects of COVID-19.

=== 21 November ===
On 21 November, South Australian Premier Steven Marshall announced that authorities would be ending the state's "circuit breaker" restrictions after a hospitality worker at the center of the cases admitted misleading authorities. Under the easing of lockdown restrictions, limited numbers of people will be allowed to attend private functions, funerals, restaurants and pubs.

== See also ==
- Timeline of the COVID-19 pandemic
