= Admiral Barrett =

Admiral Barrett may refer to:

- Danelle Barrett (born 1967), U.S. Navy rear admiral
- Edward J. Barrett (born 1943), U.S. Coast Guard rear admiral
- Tim Barrett (admiral) (born 1959), Royal Australian Navy vice admiral
- Thomas J. Barrett (born 1947), U.S. Coast Guard vice admiral

== See also ==
- Edward Gabriel André Barrett (1827–1880), U.S. Navy commodore (admiral equivalent rank)
