= MonsterMind =

MonsterMind is an alleged program of the U.S. National Security Agency (NSA) that, according to Edward Snowden, can autonomously recognize and respond to a foreign cyberattack. The existence of this system has not been proven, but it has been actively discussed in society.

== History ==
On August 13, 2014, the American magazine Wired alleged the existence of the MonsterMind program after journalist James Bamford conducted an extensive interview with Edward Snowden.

Snowden claimed that the program tracks unusual patterns in Internet traffic that indicate an attack, using algorithms to analyze metadata. Once identified, MonsterMind automatically blocked the traffic from entering the United States.

On September 17, 2019, Snowden released his autobiographical book, Permanent Record, detailing his childhood, his work at the Central Intelligence Agency and the NSA, and the motivations behind his 2013 leak of classified information exposing global surveillance programs.

== Purpose ==
MonsterMind is described as an autonomous cyberwarfare program capable of responding to cyberattacks from other countries without human intervention. The program is said to use anomaly detection software to identify potential foreign cyberattacks. After identifying such patterns, MonsterMind can automatically block and respond to these attacks.

== Debate ==
The MonsterMind program, as described by Snowden, has generated considerable interest and concern. One of the main issues raised by Snowden is the potential for misdirected counterattacks due to the autonomous nature of MonsterMind. For example, an attacker could misrepresent the source of an attack, causing MonsterMind to inadvertently attack an innocent third party, such as a hospital in another country.

Apart from domestic privacy issues, Snowden warns that the program could create problems in international relations. Since cyberattacks launched by MonsterMind could be routed through computers in third countries, there is a risk of escalating conflicts or misunderstandings with those nations. The American Civil Liberties Union (ACLU) has expressed concern about the lack of transparency and debate about the legality and appropriateness of such surveillance programs and has been actively monitoring developments. If the U.S. government is indeed scanning all Internet traffic entering the country, it raises serious questions about civil liberties.

== See also ==
- Edward Snowden
- Snowden effect
