= Lindsay Mills =

American acrobat and blogger (born 1985)

- Born: February 17, 1985 (age 41); Laurel, Maryland, U.S.
- Occupations: Blogger; gymnast
- Spouse: Edward Snowden (m. 2017)
- Children: 2
- Website: Archived 21 September 2019 at the Wayback Machine

Lindsay Mills (born February 17, 1985) is an American acrobat and blogger. She came to international attention as the partner of former NSA contractor Edward Snowden in 2013 at the time of his disclosures. Mills left the United States to join Snowden in exile in Moscow around October 2014. They married in 2017.

== Early life and education ==
Mills's father Jonathan Mills lives in Laurel, Maryland. She graduated from Laurel High School, studied at the Maryland Institute College of Art, and became a dancer and acrobat.

Mills and Edward Snowden lived together in Baltimore, Japan, and Hawaii. They have been together since at least 2009. She is a devout Buddhist.

Mills kept a blog in which she posted pictures of herself posing and performing.

== Snowden disclosures ==
On May 20, 2013, Snowden left Hawaii for Hong Kong and told her that he was going on a business trip.

On June 6, 2013, agents from the National Security Agency (NSA) searched Mills's home seeking Snowden. On June 9, 2013, The Guardian published a story revealing that Snowden had made the global surveillance disclosures. On June 10, 2013, Mills wrote on her website, "I'll be refraining from blog posts for awhile" then deleted all posts within a day.

Mills was shocked to learn what had happened to Snowden, writing on her personal blog, "I feel alone, lost, overwhelmed, and desperate for a reprieve".

Mills became the focus of a media sensation after the global surveillance disclosures when she was identified as Snowden's girlfriend. One media outlet called Mills "the girlfriend Edward Snowden left behind". In 2013, BuzzFeed reviewed Mills's personal blog. It noted that she had a boyfriend whom she called "E" and her "man of mystery". Mills blogged about Snowden leaving soon after he left.

After Snowden left Hawaii, reporters sought to question members of the Waikiki Acrobatic Troupe for insight into Mills and Snowden's relationship. Some comments reported from that interview included "I never got to know her", "I wasn't even aware she was in a relationship", and "I have no idea how much pole and other stuff she'd done".

Between June 2013 and 2014, there was no public awareness in the media of any interaction between Mills and Snowden. By January 2014, Mills had not spoken to the media for seven months. Mills's father shared that she was trying to make sense of what had happened and plan for her future.

Later, the Citizenfour documentary included a scene which showed Snowden and Mills reunited in Moscow. This revelation, in October 2014, was the first indication in the media that they were still dating. The information that Mills and Snowden were together and happy was surprising because until the documentary, the media had reported that Snowden's life in Russia was a miserable punishment.

Mills and Glenn Greenwald joined director Laura Poitras on stage at the 87th Academy Awards to accept the Academy Award for Citizenfour, Mills took one of the three Oscar statues awarded in the ceremony. Reflecting on the experience of being on stage to receive the statue for Snowden, Mills later commented, "We won a motherfucking Oscar!". In September 2016, one reporter described the Oscar showing as "Mills's most notable public appearance".

For Halloween 2015, Mills posted pictures of herself with Snowden in Halloween costumes as Carmen Sandiego and Waldo of Where's Waldo?. Both popular fictional characters are known for hiding. In the photo, Mills and Snowden are posing in front of the J. Edgar Hoover Building but presumably this is photo manipulation because they supposedly remain in Russia.

Permanent Record, Snowden's 2019 book, features Mills's writings from her diary as part of the narrative of the surveillance disclosures.

== Public image ==
Mills has a history of being highly active in new media publishing, including social media, blogging, and video sharing. Her father described her as artistic, free and open, and the opposite of Edward Snowden.

A reviewer for The New Yorker described Mills's blog as "a mixture of chatty accounts of Mills's days in Hawaii, stories of her athletic and pole-dancing feats, descriptions of fun evenings with friends, and declarations of girl power." A writer for The Daily Telegraph described Mills's blog and social media presence as vivid. Snowden has criticized the media's use of sexy pictures to portray Mills. The character of Lindsay Mills has a prominent place in Snowden, a 2016 dramatization of Snowden's global surveillance disclosure. Director Oliver Stone said that the relationship between Mills and Snowden was an important part of his movie. Actress Shailene Woodley plays Mills in the film. Unable to meet Mills in person before filming, Woodley based her performance on information from Mills's blog and social media posts.

In 2020, it was announced that Mills was pregnant and that she and Snowden intended to apply for Russian citizenship without renouncing their U.S. citizenship. Their son was born in December 2020. In 2020, Russia granted Snowden permanent residency rights, and on September 26, 2022, President Vladimir Putin signed a decree granting him Russian citizenship.
