= Edward J. Barrett =

American naval officer (born 1943)

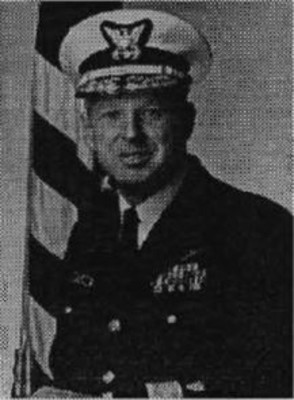
- Born: Edward Joseph Barrett; August 14, 1943 (age 83); Poughkeepsie, New York, U.S.
- Relatives: Edward Snowden (grandson)
- Military career
- Allegiance: United States
- Branch: United States Coast Guard
- Service years: 1966–1999
- Rank: Rear admiral
- Nickname: Eddie

Edward Joseph Barrett (born August 14, 1943) is a former flag officer in the United States Coast Guard, serving as chief of systems of the Coast Guard from 1996 to 1999. He is the grandfather of former NSA contractor Edward Snowden.

== Early life ==
Barrett was born in the city of Poughkeepsie in the state of New York, United States on August 14, 1943. He graduated from the United States Coast Guard Academy in 1966.

== Military career ==
Barrett completed Naval Flight training at NAS Pensacola Florida in 1968. In 1995, he was inducted into the United States Coast Guard Academy hall of fame. He became a senior official with the FBI and was at the Pentagon during the September 11 attacks.

=== Systems and logistics ===
Barrett has testified before Congress several times in regard to narcotics, explosives, and ship scanning technology.

== Family ==
Barrett is married to the former Anne Stokley of Wrightsville Beach, North Carolina. They have three daughters: Elizabeth Wendy Snowden, Jennifer Barrett, and Julie Barret. He is the former father-in-law of Chief Warrant Officer Lonnie Glenn Snowden Jr., USCG (Ret).
