= Refugees and asylum in Russia =

The Russian Federation's Law on Refugees defines who is a refugee for purposes of obtaining asylum in the country. The Law defines a refugee as a "person who is outside their country of nationality or habitual residence; has a well-founded fear of persecution because of their race, religion, nationality, membership in a particular social group or political opinion; and is unable or unwilling to avail themself of the protection of that country, or to return there, for fear of persecution". Upon receiving an asylum seeker's application, the Russian Migration Service determines whether the asylum seeker meets the legislative definition of a "refugee" and should be granted asylum.

As of year end 2006, 1,020 people have been granted temporary asylum status and 405 people have been granted full refugee status by the Russian government. It is estimated, however, that there may be as many as one million "undocumented foreigners" on Russian soil awaiting initial access to the procedure of refugee status determination. The Russian authorities are notorious for denying refugee status to asylum seekers – with the approval rate for refugee status at only 2–5% of applicants. As of 2022, 1,230,131 people have been granted asylum in Russia.

According to an April 2007 report, individuals from Afghanistan constitute the largest number of asylum seekers in Russia. According to Vladimir Rucheikov, head of asylum issues in the Citizenship and Registration Department of the Ministry of Internal Affairs, Afghanis make up over 70% of all submitted applications. Additionally, Afghans make up the majority of those that actually gain refugee status (as of 2006, 962 Afghans have been granted temporary asylum status and 240 Afghans have been granted full refugee status). Asylum seekers in Russia also originate from various African and Middle Eastern countries.

Given the significant difficulty in obtaining refugee status, many asylum seekers seek non profit legal representation (such as the United Nations High Commissioner for Refugees (UNHCR), that help them consider the most durable and realistic solution for them and their family. Without legal assistance, the legal intricacies of the Law on Refugees are likely to be overlooked, and their application for asylum could be denied regardless of the legitimacy of their claim.

The Convention relating to the Status of Refugees was adopted at a special United Nations conference. The Soviet Union, however, never ratified the 1951 Convention, partly because it viewed the Convention as a treaty whose standards "were dictated by the Western Countries".

After the collapse of the Soviet Union in 1991, however, a large number of people from the former Soviet Union republics migrated into the Russian Federation. In direct response to the dramatic migration into the country, Russia, in 1992, accepted the establishment of the UNHCR and established the Federal Migration Service (FMS). A year after establishing the FMS, Russia acceded to the 1951 Convention (and the 1967 Protocol) and enacted specific legislation to address the increased migration.

In 1993, Russia adopted three laws to address the issue of migration. The first law, incorporated under the Russian Constitution, grants individuals the right to claim political asylum in Russia. The second law, the Law on Forced Migrants, addressed those asylum seekers who either already had Russian citizenship or were qualified to obtain it. These migrants were mainly people living in FSU republics, with or without Russian citizenship, that were forced to move to Russia after the fall of the Soviet Union for economic reasons. The Law on Forced Migrants allowed these individuals to freely and legally move to Russia. The third law, the Law on Refugees, addressed those asylum seekers coming from states other than the former Soviet Union republics, or the "far abroad". In effect, the laws enacted in 1993 were meant to offer protection first to former Soviet citizens, and second to citizens of all other countries. In fact, the dominant interpretation of the 1993 Law on Refugees was that refugee status was to be granted only to asylum seekers from the "near abroad" (the former Soviet republics). However, as Russia began to develop in the mid 1990s, large numbers of individuals fearing persecution for various reasons in the Middle East, Africa, and Asia viewed Russia as a safe place to migrate to. In response, in 1997, Russia amended and replaced the 1993 Law on Refugees to better address those individuals who have traveled to Russia in need of international protection.

== Russia's current law on refugees ==
The 1997 Law on Refugees, though slightly amended in 1998 and 2000, represents the Russian Federation's current legislation on refugees.

=== General process of attaining asylum in Russia ===
According to Article 4.1(3), an asylum seeker who enters the Russian Federation illegally must file an application with the regional Ministry of Internal Affairs within 24 hours. According to a 2002 World Refugee Survey, the majority of applications that have been submitted to regional MOI offices are from foreigners who have entered illegally. While an individual cannot be detained for illegally entering Russia for the purposes of applying for asylum, the penal code allows the government to imprison illegal immigrants including unregistered asylum seekers – making it even more imperative to meet the 24-hour deadline. Even though the 24-hour limit can be relaxed, Article 5.1(7) states that a violation can serve as the basis for denial of a substantive evaluation of an applicant's claim.

In the application, the asylum seeker must describe in detail the situation in his home country and the reason why the FMS should grant him refugee status. Once the asylum seeker has registered and has an application filed with the MOI, the individual can either stay in a Temporary Accommodation Center (TAC) or find another place to live until his status is determined.

According to Article 4.6, once an application is received, the Russian authorities should issue a certificate to asylum seekers. The FMS will then conduct a Refugee Status Determination (RSD), a process that could take up to one year. The FMS will first assess the admissibility of the asylum seeker's claim and, if found admissible, then examine the individual case on the merits (substantive examination). Article 3.3 states that these determination must be based on an interview, completion of a questionnaire and examination of the credibility of the data provided. If the application is denied and the applicant does not appeal to the Russian courts, the individual becomes immediately excluded from the Law on Refugees. The Department of Passport and Visa Registration of the Ministry of Internal Affairs begins the process of deporting the individual. If the individual does not leave in the specified time frame, usually six months, the Ministry can detain the individual. However, Article 12.2(2) allows the FMS to grant temporary asylum to those individuals who cannot be deported for humanitarian reasons. This concept of "non-refoulement", or expressly prohibiting the expulsion of a refugee into an area where she or he might be again subjected to persecution, is well documented in the 1951 Convention – but not explicitly stated in Russian law. Russia's answer to the fundamental principle of non-refoulement is to offer temporary asylum status, subject to revocation, to those who might again be subject to persecution.

If the applicant is determined to be a legitimate refugee and is granted asylum by the FMS, he will immediately be entitled to receive travel documents and a refugee ID card. The refugee status is only granted on a temporary basis. According to Article 7.9, refugee status can be granted for up to three years, after which it must be extended on an annual basis. Once declared a refugee by the Russian authorities, the refugee can then apply for Russian citizenship.

Throughout the entire process, the asylum seeker is without a certificate of registration with the police (called a propiska) – a requirement for all Russian citizens and visitors of Russia. Because most asylum seekers do not have legal status, they cannot obtain the necessary propiskas. This lack of registration typically leads to multiple fines and arrests, which can ultimately affect the asylum seeker's ability to attain "refugee" status – as the FMS can exclude the individual from an RSD if he has committed any crimes, even minor ones, in Russia.

=== Admissibility of Claim Determination – Exclusionary Provisions ===
According to the Law on Refugees, some asylum seekers will be explicitly excluded from being considered refugees before any substantive determination is made by the FMS.

Article 2.2 excludes asylum seekers who have fled their country of origin for "economic reasons due to hunger, epidemic, or natural or man-made emergencies".

Article 5 of the Law describes in which circumstances a claim shall not be considered on its merits. These include: (1) if there is a criminal proceeding against the applicant for allegedly committing a crime in Russia; (2) the case of repetitive applications; (3) the case in which the applicant has received a negative decision on refugee status in any State that has acceded the 1951 Convention; (4) the principle of safe third country – the case in which an asylum seeker arrived in Russia from a country where he could have claimed asylum; (5) the case of asylum seekers who did not flee persecution and who are unwilling to return owing to fear of punishment for their illegal departure or for another offence committed in their home country, and; (6) the case of asylum seekers who illegally enter Russia and do not apply for refugee status within 24 hours from the moment of entry.

=== Substantive determination – definition of refugee status ===
In order for an individual to seek asylum in Russia, he must be designated by the Federal Migration Service as such. The FMS will conduct a substantive investigation, or Refugee Status Determination (RSD), once an asylum seekers application is registered. The 1997 Law on Refugees defines the term "refugee" as "a person who is outside his/her country of nationality or habitual residence; has a well-founded fear of persecution because of his/her race, religion, nationality, membership in a particular social group or political opinion; and is unable or unwilling to avail himself/herself of the protection of that country, or to return there, for fear of persecution". The individual seeking asylum must satisfy the requirements set forth in the definition of "refugee" in order to obtain asylum in Russia.

== Criticism of Russia's law on refugees ==
Human rights campaigners have been vocal in denouncing the negative aspects of Russia's Law on Refugees. The following are examples of their most notable concerns:

Observers have found it to be an extreme measure that an asylum seeker's application can be summarily denied if the applicant fails to apply within 24 hours of entering the country. The 24 hour deadline is arguably too difficult to meet in practice, given that many asylum seekers are being detained at the borders for three days upon arrival – with no knowledge of the requirement and no access to legal representation.

Human rights organizations are concerned with the conditions at the various detention centers – where the unregistered and denied asylum seekers are placed. According to one specialist, detention centers in Russia differ little from the country's prisons. For example, features of a detention center in St. Petersburg, include two square meters of space per person, permanent isolation from the outer world, and a 20-minute walk per day. Furthermore, there is no formal system to independently review the Ministry of Internal Affairs' decision to detain people and no particular limits on the length of time an individual can be detained. Therefore, if an individual is appealing their denial of asylum, he will continue to be detained during the duration of his appeal.

Organizations are concerned that the safe third country rule (concept that an applicant will be denied a substantive examination of their claim if they arrived from a country where they could have claimed asylum) is not well considered. The UNHCR, for instance, argues that the safe third country rule fails to consider whether the applicant really had the chance to apply for asylum in that country, and furthermore, whether the applicant can actually re-enter into that country.

There is no clear and explicit provision that prohibits refoulement (that prohibits Russia from returning individuals to their home country where their lives or freedoms could be threatened). Opponents contend that with no guarantee that asylum seekers will not be forcibly returned to the country they fled, the Law fails its central purpose and is inconsistent with a norm in international law.

Even when refugee status is present, it is only a temporary benefit limited to three years, after which it must be extended on an annual basis. Opponents of the law suggest that the process in and of itself is difficult to manage. Once a determination is made, the refugee should be free to live like all other residents of the country.

Finally, the most troubling complaint is that in some cases the law cannot be relied upon because it is not being properly implemented by the authorities (i.e. state authorities fail to issue a certificate to the asylum seeker upon receiving application, in accordance with Article 4.6). Legal representatives of asylum seekers, such as the UNHCR and the Committee for Civic Assistance, complain that individuals with legitimate claims are being denied asylum without just cause – and where a showing of persecution upon return to their home country is clear and apparent. Others argue that the law is not being properly implemented because the attention of the Russian authorities in the migration sphere is elsewhere – primarily with combating illegal migration.

== Organizations offering legal representation to refugees ==
The United Nations High Commissioner for Refugees (UNHCR) and the Committee for Civic Assistance (CCA) provide legal consulting to refugees and forced migrants, mediate between refugees and the authorities, defend refugees in the courts, and advocate for refugee rights to housing and work. In connection with these tasks, both organizations have constant contact with all structures dealing with refugee problems: the Federal Migration Service, regional migration services, and the Commission on Refugees in the State Duma.

=== Durable solutions ===
Organizations such as the UNHCR and the CCA work directly with those individuals they deem worthy of "refugee" status (i.e. UN mandated refugees – though this status is not recognized by the Russian authorities) and help them with reaching the most desirable outcome for them and their family. The three most durable solutions are:

==== Voluntary repatriation ====
In some instances, the situation in a mandated refugee's home country changes for the better, and the fear of persecution upon return is no longer an immediate or long term issue. Nevertheless, the issuance of exit visas by the Russian authorities remains an obstacle delaying the repatriation process. The UNHCR helps the individual determine the best way to return home. With the aid of the UNHCR, the Russian authorities will offer a one time deportation visa (which takes less than one week), as opposed to the exit visa normally required of all individuals leaving Russia (which could take several months).

==== Local integration ====
According to the Law on Refugees, Government recognized refugees can apply for citizenship. Nevertheless, there are significant legal obstacles for their acquisition of citizenship due to the restrictive registration system, which required proof of adequate income. Local integration, though typically desirable, is an unrealistic goal for most asylum seekers as the Russian government does not recognize the UN mandated refugees.

==== Resettlement ====
The most common solution for UN recognized refugees is resettlement. Due to inadequate protection capacity, resettlement remains the most viable option for UN mandated refugees. It is estimated that there are thousands of UN mandated refugees in Russia who have been in the Russian asylum system for five years or more. For these individuals especially, resettlement to Western Europeans countries and to North America is very desirable – where they can actually settle. The UNHCR works with the migration offices of these countries and attempts to find these mandated refugees a home.

== Present day conditions for asylum seekers in Russia ==
The conditions for asylum seekers in Russia are generally very poor. Asylum seekers in Russia typically have to wait years to receive a decision from the FMS. During that time, they are typically living without proper legal documents – making it nearly impossible for them to find a job outside of the local food markets. According to the United Nations, until recognized as refugees by the state, asylum seekers cannot enjoy such rights as "legal employment, healthcare, housing assistance and social benefits" – and even the right to register marriages and births.

Asylum seekers in Russia are constantly in friction with the police. Amnesty International states that "asylum seekers are often harassed and ill-treated by law enforcement officers who feel they can abuse such people with impunity". Amnesty International has received persistent reports of asylum-seekers from outside the territory of the former Soviet Union having their identity papers destroyed by police and being subjected to police harassment in the form of extortion, beatings and general intimidation. Many have been subjected to police raids or intimidated into leaving their homes.

Xenophobia, a fear or hatred of foreigners, is another problem that confronts asylum seekers and refugees. Xenophobia is of particular concern to those that look different than the local community. Such groups include specifically: Africans, Afghans, Iraqis, and Tajiks. There are many occurrences of asylum seekers being beaten by local gangs. In fact, some asylum seekers do not even report attacks for fear of police harassment, since many do not have official status.

Absence of legal documents resulting in problems with housing, employment, and health care, as well as ongoing harassment from the police make it extremely difficult for asylum seekers waiting for refugee status determination.
