= Cecilia Magnusson =

Swedish politician

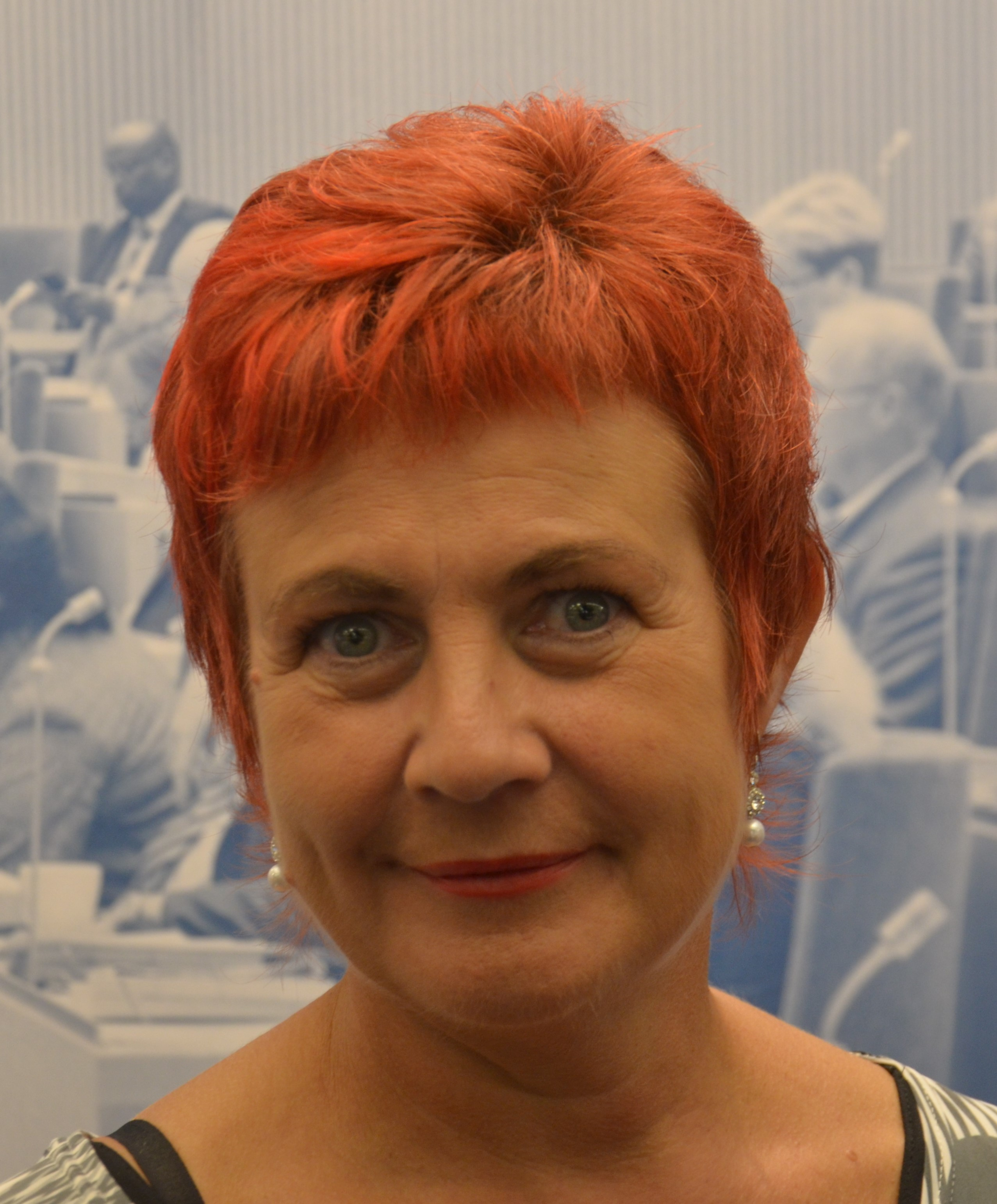
- Cecilia Magnusson in September 2014

Member of Parliament
- In office 1998–2018

Personal details
- Political party: Moderate Party

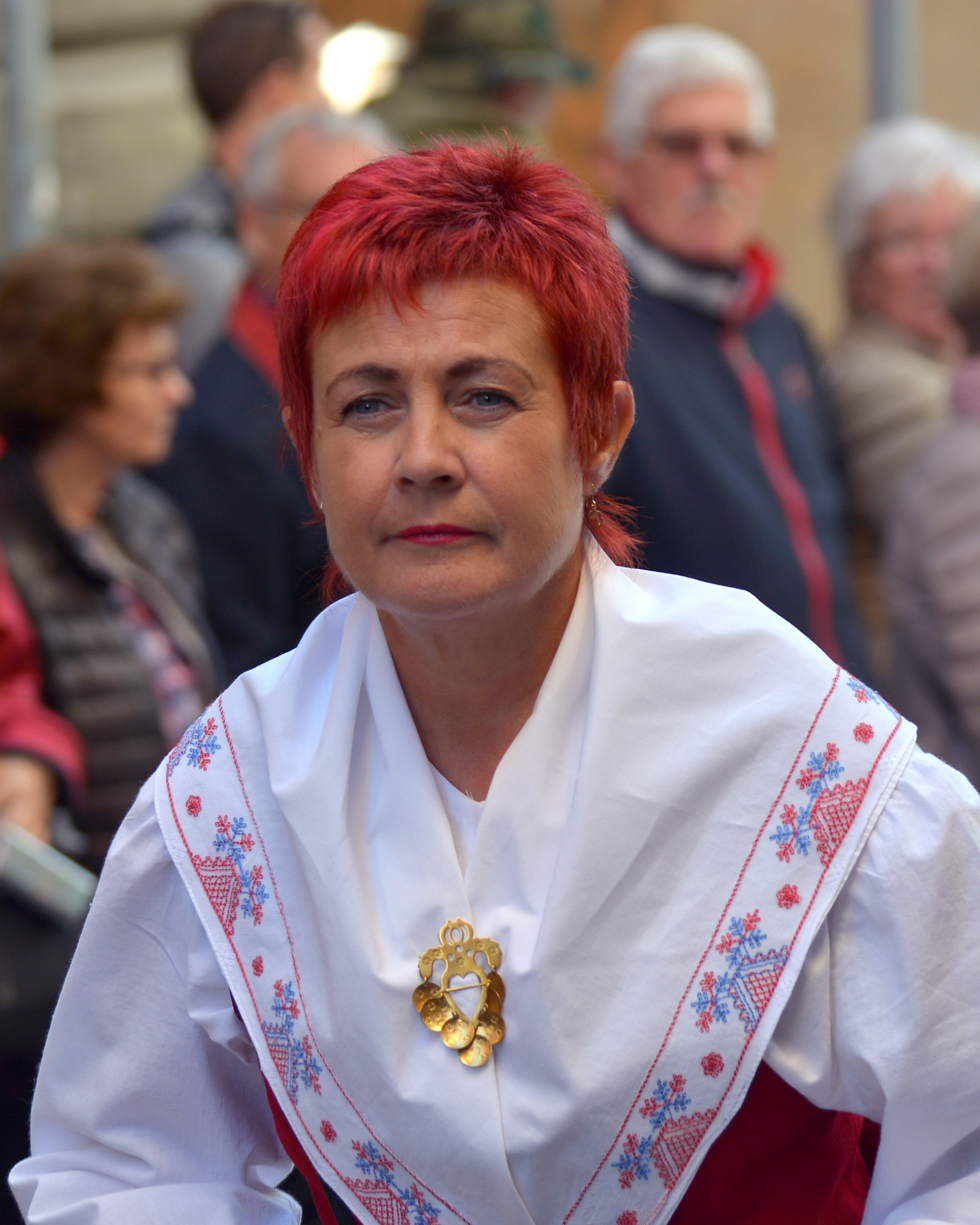
Cecilia Magnusson.

Cecilia Magnusson (born 1962) is a Swedish politician of the Moderate Party. She was member of the Riksdag from 1998 to 2018.
