= David Miranda (politician) =

Brazilian politician (1985–2023)

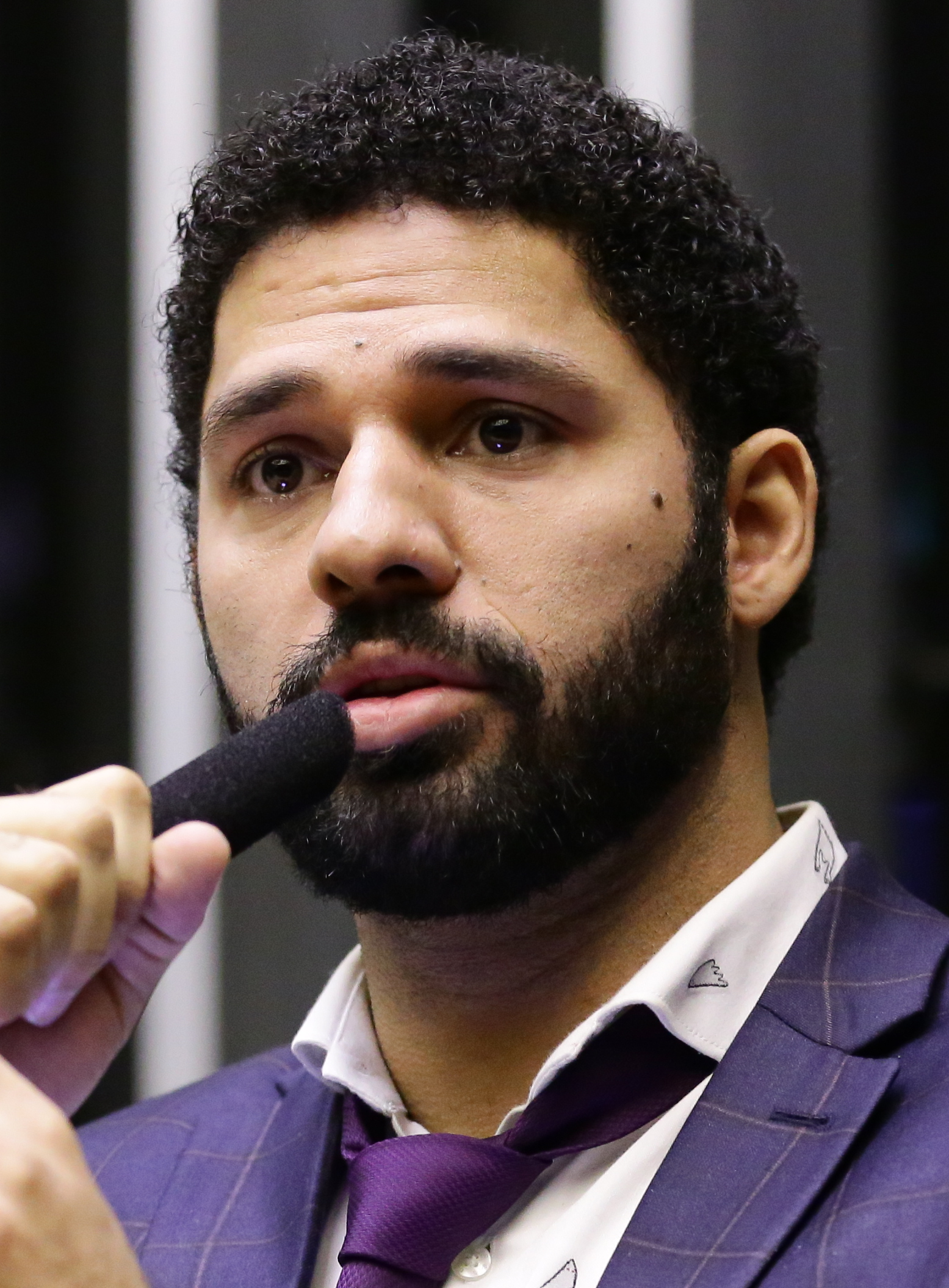
- Miranda in 2019

Federal Deputy
- In office 1 February 2019 – 1 February 2023
- Constituency: Rio de Janeiro

Councillor of Rio de Janeiro
- In office 1 January 2017 – 1 February 2019
- Constituency: At-large

Personal details
- Born: David Michael dos Santos Miranda; 10 May 1985 Rio de Janeiro, Brazil
- Died: 9 May 2023 (aged 37) Rio de Janeiro, Brazil
- Party: PSOL (2014–2022); PDT (2022–2023)
- Spouse: Glenn Greenwald (m. 2005)
- Children: 3
- Occupation: Politician

David Michael dos Santos Miranda (Portuguese: [ˈdejvidʒi miˈɾɐ̃dɐ]; 10 May 1985 – 9 May 2023) was a Brazilian politician. He was a Federal Congressman representing the state of Rio de Janeiro, serving from 2019 until 2023, and was affiliated with the Democratic Labour Party (PDT), after switching parties from the Socialism and Liberty Party (PSOL) in 2022. Prior to that, he was a City Councilman representing the city of Rio de Janeiro. Miranda also played a key role in Edward Snowden's global surveillance leaks.

In 2019, Miranda was named by Time magazine as one of the world's next generation of new leaders.

== Snowden disclosures involvement ==
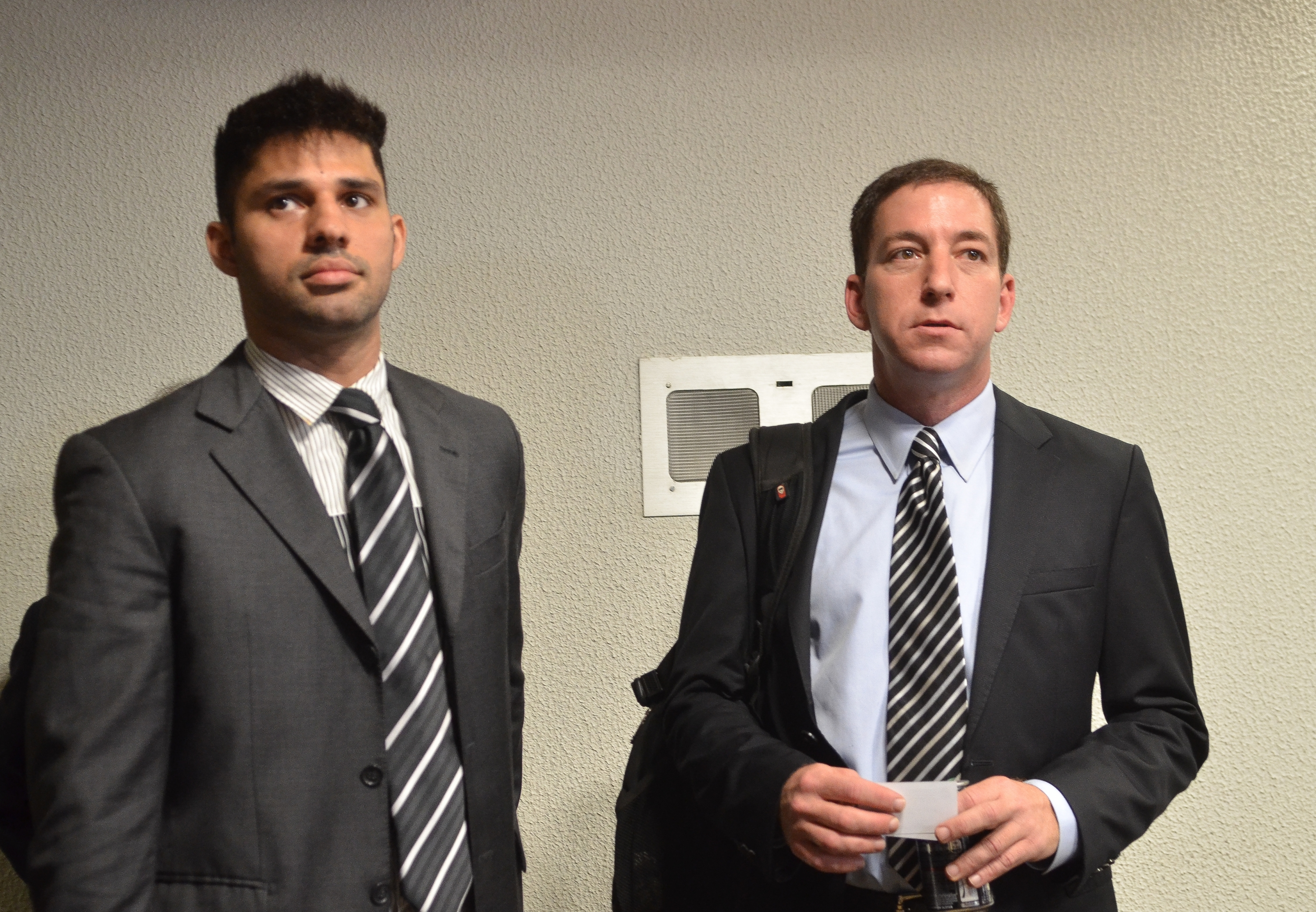
Miranda and his husband Glenn Greenwald in 2013

In August 2013, Miranda was carrying a thumb drive with classified material provided by Edward Snowden when he was detained by the British government at London's Heathrow Airport under Schedule 7 of the Terrorism Act 2000 on a layover between Berlin and Rio de Janeiro. The material had been given to Miranda by Laura Poitras, intended for his husband, American journalist Glenn Greenwald. His belongings were seized, including the thumb drive and other electronics equipment. Greenwald described his partner's detention as "clearly intended to send a message of intimidation to those of us who have been reporting on the NSA and GCHQ". Miranda described his treatment by the UK authorities as "psychological torture" and later said, "I was sure I was going away to Guantánamo forever."

He sued the British government over his detention, but in 2014 it was ruled lawful by the UK High Court, which accepted that the detention and seizure of computer material was "an indirect interference with press freedom", but said this was justified by legitimate and "very pressing" interests of national security. A 2016 ruling by the Court of Appeal found that the provision of the Terrorism Act used for Miranda's detention was "incompatible with the European convention on human rights", but that the detention itself was lawful.

Miranda led the campaign for the Brazilian government to grant political asylum to Edward Snowden and worked with Greenwald, to publish the revelations contained in Snowden's leaks detailing mass surveillance by the National Security Agency (NSA). He met with Luciana Genro, the PSOL candidate for the 2014 Brazilian presidential election, and obtained her commitment to extend asylum to Snowden if elected. Numerous public Brazilian figures supported the campaign, which failed to convince the government of Dilma Rousseff.

== Political career ==
In 2016, Miranda and his friend Marielle Franco were elected as the first LGBTQ councillors in Rio's history. Miranda focused primarily on the issues of the LGBT community and other marginalized segments of the Rio population. Miranda and his family travelled in a bulletproof car since Franco was assassinated in March 2018.

In 2018, Miranda was elected as a substitute for PSOL deputy Jean Wyllys. When Wyllys, an LGBT member, announced in January 2019 that he had left the country due to death threats, Miranda, who was also a PSOL member, took Wyllys' place in the Chamber of Deputies. After taking his seat, Miranda began to receive "hundreds" of death threats. Joice Hasselmann, a representative of the ex-President Jair Bolsonaro's party, accused Miranda of buying his seat. Due to the intimidation from Hasselmann and Bolsonaro supporters during the Vaza Jato reporting Greenwald was engaged in, Miranda disclosed that he had begun taking anti-depressants and that he and Greenwald left their home rarely and only ever with hired bodyguards.

On 11 September 2019, O Globo newspaper reported that an investigation by a division of the Brazilian Ministry of the Economy identified R$2.5 million in suspicious transactions in Miranda's personal bank account during a one year period from 2018 to 2019, including deposits from current and former employees. As a result, the Public Ministry opened an investigation into his finances. According to media reports, investigators suspected Miranda of "concealing the origin" of the funds and participating in an illegal practice known as "rachadinha", in which public servants employed in the offices of elected officials kick back a portion of their salary to their boss. Glenn Greenwald accused the Brazilian Public Ministry, which represents prosecutors, of launching the investigation and leaking it for political reasons, due to his involvement in uncovering corruption and political bias among Brazilian prosecutors and judges involved in the Lava Jato operation. 2018 center-left presidential candidate Ciro Gomes and center-right pundit Reinaldo Azevedo both described the investigation against Miranda as borne out of a spirit of police state and political persecution. A few days afterwards, Miranda and Greenwald opened their bank accounts for public access, and challenged the Bolsonaro family to follow suit.

On 22 January 2022, Miranda announced that he was leaving the PSOL and joining the Democratic Labour Party (PDT) and endorsing its leader Ciro Gomes in the 2022 Brazilian general election.

== Personal life ==
Miranda was raised in Jacarezinho, Rio de Janeiro. His mother died when he was five, and he moved in with an aunt. He left home when he was 13, dropped out of school, and worked in menial jobs for the next six years. He was playing volleyball on Ipanema beach in February 2005 when he knocked over the drink of Glenn Greenwald, who was visiting Brazil for vacation. The couple moved in together within a week, and married in 2005.

Soon after they first met, Greenwald encouraged Miranda's return to education and he graduated from Escola Superior de Propaganda e Marketing (ESPM) in 2014. In 2017, the couple adopted two children who are siblings. They adopted a third child in 2021.

== Death ==
Miranda was hospitalized on 6 August 2022 at Clínica São Vicente, in Gávea, to treat a gastrointestinal infection. He then suffered from a series of successive infections, including a case of sepsis. He died on 9 May 2023, a day before his 38th birthday, after being hospitalized in an ICU for nine months. Various Brazilian politicians, including president Luiz Inácio Lula da Silva, expressed sorrow over his death.
