= Carla Zambelli =

Brazilian politician

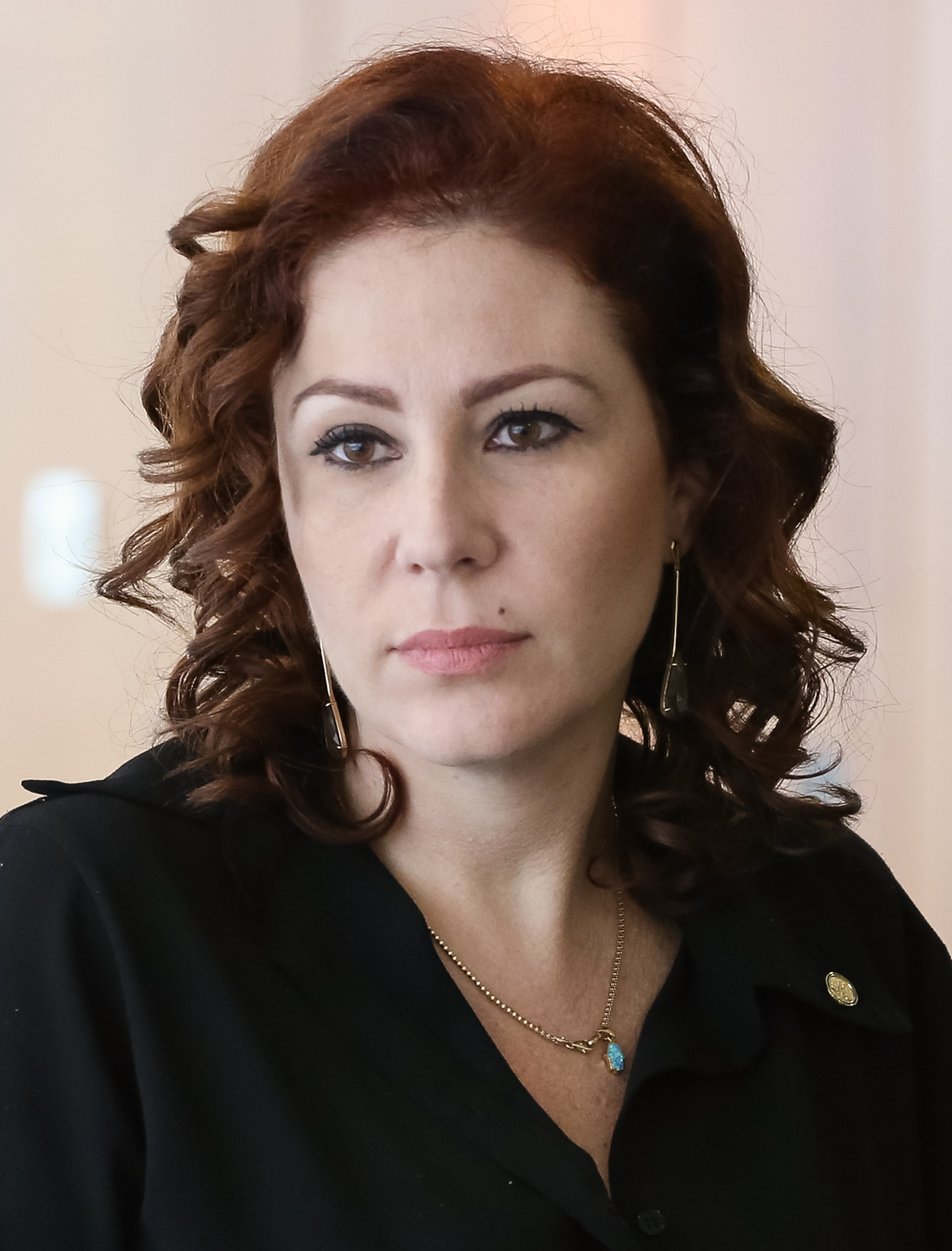
- Zambelli in 2019

Federal Deputy
- In office 1 February 2019 – 14 December 2025
- Constituency: São Paulo

Personal details
- Born: Carla Zambelli Salgado; 3 July 1980 (age 46) Ribeirão Preto, São Paulo, Brazil
- Citizenship: Brazil; Italy
- Party: PL (2022–present)
- Other political affiliations: PSL (2018–2022); UNIÃO (2022)
- Spouse: Aginaldo de Oliveira (m. 2020)
- Relatives: Bruno Zambelli (brother)
- Occupation: Project manager
- Criminal information
- Status: Arrested
- Convictions: Fraudulent misrepresentation, computer device hacking
- Penalty: 10 years in prison
- Accomplice: Walter Delgatti Neto

Carla Zambelli Salgado de Oliveira (Note: Portuguese pronunciation: [ˈkaʁ.lɐ zɐ̃.beˈli sawˈɡa.du d͡ʒi o.liˈve(j).ɾɐ]) (born 3 July 1980) is a Brazilian right-wing politician and convicted criminal wanted by Brazilian justice. Founder of the movement On the Streets, Zambelli gained notoriety through her activism in favor of the impeachment of the ex-president Dilma Rousseff. In the elections of 2018, she was elected federal deputy for São Paulo, by the Social Liberal Party (PSL).

On January 30, 2025, the São Paulo Regional Electoral Court (TRE-SP) revoked Congresswoman Carla Zambelli's mandate on the basis of political abuse and misuse of media by spreading false information about the 2022 election and for the crimes of illegal possession of a firearm and illegal coercion when, in an episode in 2022, armed, she chased a citizen on the street in Jardins, São Paulo. However, the decision is not yet final. Zambelli has the right to appeal to the Superior Electoral Court (TSE).

Twenty days after her sentencing for the crimes of hacking into a computer device, fraudulent misrepresentation (falsidade ideológica) and insertion of false data into the National Council of Justice (CNJ) system, she fled Brazil to Italy through the Argentine border, citing alleged "political persecution by Alexandre de Moraes" as her reason, leading Interpol to include her name on the red list. She was detained in Italy in July 2025 and is expected to be extradited to Brazil.

On August 22, 2025, the Supreme Federal Court voted to sentence Zambelli to five years and three months in prison for illegal possession of a firearm and illegal coercion through the use of a firearm in the armed pursuit case.

On December 11, 2025, Supreme Federal Court Justice Alexandre de Moraes annulled the vote by the Chamber of Deputies that had upheld Zambelli's mandate. The magistrate ordered the loss of her position as a federal deputy as a consequence of the criminal conviction.

Her profile has been described by some as belonging to the far-right Bolsonarist ideology.

== Biography and views ==
Zambelli was born on 3 July 1980 in Ribeirão Preto, São Paulo, Brazil.

In 2017 she declared herself a monarchist, after conversations with members of the imperial family. She is against affirmative action, except for people with disabilities.

In the elections of 2018, she was elected federal deputy by the PSL. She said that her line of action in the Chamber of Deputies will continue to be the fight against corruption. According to Zambelli, this will be done through three pillars: "less state, more justice and real education."

In April 2022, she stated that she was gathering support for fellow lawmaker Daniel Silveira to be given amnesty.

=== COVID-19 ===
On May 30, 2020, while on the Brasil Urgente show, Zambelli stated that empty coffins were being buried in the state of Ceará, supposedly as an attempt to inflate COVID-19 death statistics. The photograph mentioned by Zambelli as evidence was later shown to have been taken in 2017, in the state of São Paulo, and was part of an investigation of a case of life insurance fraud. Zambelli's statement prompted Ceará's government to declare they would take "appropriate judicial measures".

On August 18, 2020, Zambelli's press service announced she had contracted COVID-19, and would begin treatment using hydroxychloroquine. Despite its potential negative health side effects, Zambelli has praised the drug on multiple occasions, and attributed the First Lady Michelle Bolsonaro's recovery of COVID-19 to hydroxychloroquine.

On August 24, 2020, Zambelli was hospitalized for "clinical exams and the investigation of an autoimmune disease". Two days later, on August 26, 2020, She posted on Twitter that she was "100% cured" due to early treatment using hydroxychloroquine. However, on August 28, 2020, the hospital that had admitted her denied she had contracted COVID-19 in the first place, and stated the following:

Após extensa investigação clínica, a equipe médica que acompanha a deputada chegou à conclusão de que a mesma não teve a infecção pela COVID-19 [...] Foi feito o diagnóstico de endometriose profunda e iniciado o tratamento.

Translation:

After extensive clinical investigation, the medical team that has been taking care of the deputy came to the conclusion that she did not have the infection due to COVID-19 [...] The diagnosis was deep endometriosis and treatment has begun.

After the statement, Zambelli claimed her COVID-19 test was a false positive. Following the controversy and public outcry, Zambelli deleted the tweet where she attributed her recovery to the use of hydroxychloroquine.

In March 2022, Zambelli launched a website to provide resources for those who did not wish to receive the COVID-19 vaccination, citing an excerpt for Brazil's Civil Code stating that "no one can be compelled to submit, at the risk of life, to medical treatment or surgical intervention. Zambelli was filmed on the eve of the November 2022 presidential elections, in Jardins, a neighborhood in the central area of the capital of São Paulo, entering a bar with a revolver in hand. She was caught on camera wielding a pistol and chasing a journalist, and later fled Brazil to Florida for three weeks. On the day of the approach, Zambelli was not arrested in the act.

== Controversies ==
=== Arrest for defamation of federal deputy ===
In June 2017, Zambelli was accused of defamation, and placed under citizen's arrest by federal deputies Wadih Damous and Paulo Pimenta, members of the Chamber of Deputies. The accusation came after Zambelli claimed she was "working, unlike them, who were stealing". Pimenta had legislative police escort her to the police station inside the Congress. The deputy, however, did not press charges against Zambelli.

=== Defamation of Jean Wyllys ===
In 2018, Zambelli was condemned over her online accusations of pedophilia against Jean Wyllys, a political opponent. After court battles, she organized a Crowdfund among her supporters, refusing to pay legal damages personally.

=== Alleged nepotism ===
In September 2019, Veja magazine reported Zambelli used her political influence to have her son get in Colégio Militar de Brasília, without having to go through the selection process. Zambelli claimed she had to request her son be admitted because they had previously received "threats". When questioned, the school responded that the Army's Commander is entitled to evaluate cases "considered to be special".

=== Threatening man with a gun ===
In October 2022, less than a day before the 2022 elections, Zambelli chased a man down the street who was arguing with her group of friends about politics. She then proceeded to point a pistol at him and shoot into the air, chasing the man down streets and into a bar. She yelled at him to lay on the floor and coerced him into apologizing. She later claimed he had assaulted her, although this claim was disproven after videos of the moment were released. Opposing deputies proposed revoking her mandate as well as charging her with breaking a federal law that prohibits anyone to bear guns within 24 hours of any national election.

== Electoral history ==
Year	Election	Party	Office	Votes	Percent	Result
2018	State Election of São Paulo	PSL	Federal Deputy	76,306	0.36%	Elected
2022	State Election of São Paulo	PL	Federal Deputy	946,244	3.98%	Elected
