= Glenn Greenwald =

American journalist (born 1967)

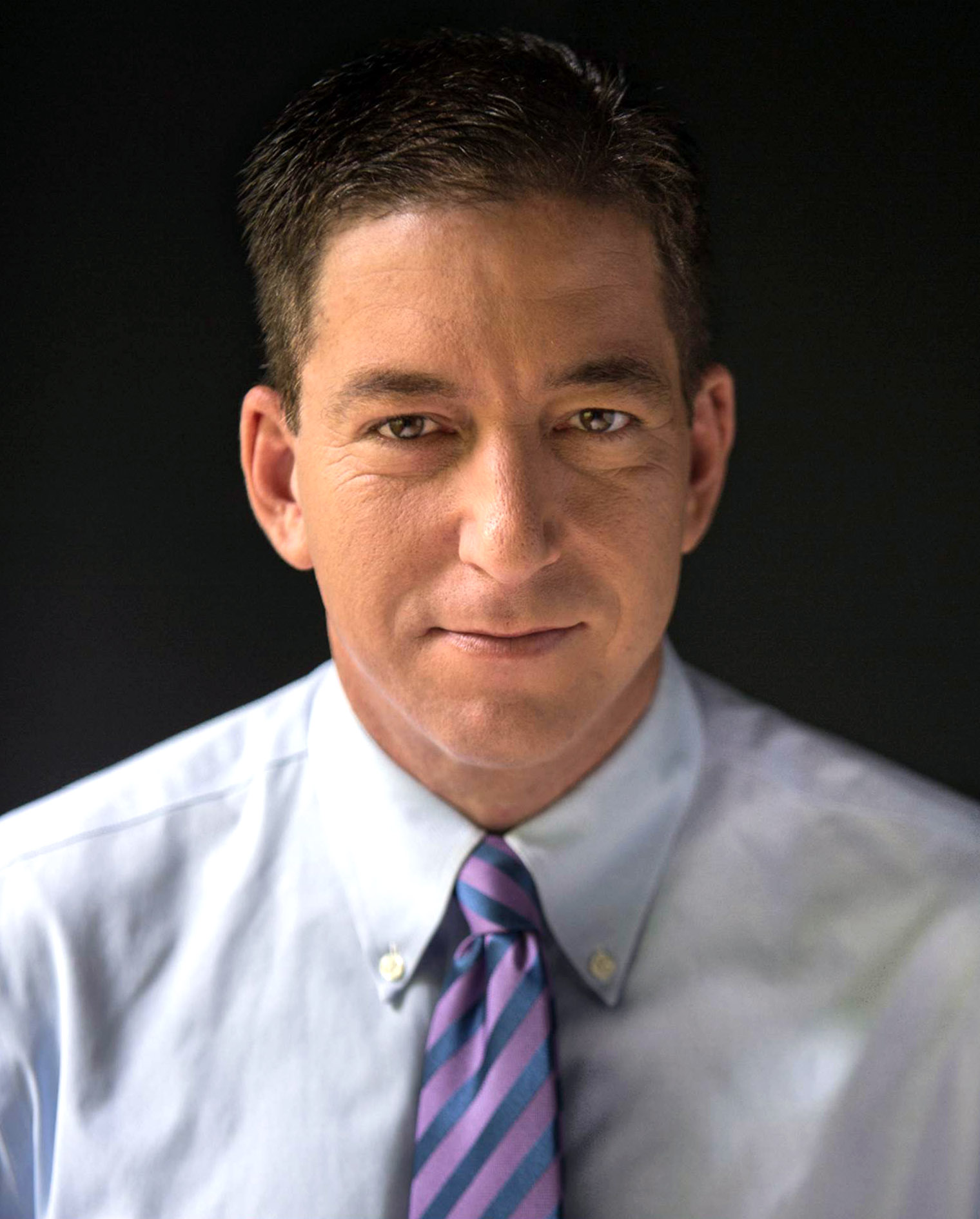
- Greenwald in 2014
- Born: Glenn Edward Greenwald; March 6, 1967 (age 59); New York City, U.S.
- Education: George Washington University (BA); New York University (JD)
- Occupations: Journalist and author
- Employer(s): The Intercept (2014–2020); The Guardian (2012–2013); Salon (2007–2012)
- Spouse: David Miranda (m. 2005; died 2023)
- Children: 3
- Writing career
- Genres: Political and legal commentary
- Subjects: U.S. politics; Brazilian politics; Law
- Notable works: How Would a Patriot Act?; A Tragic Legacy; No Place to Hide
- Website: greenwald.locals.com

Glenn Edward Greenwald (born March 6, 1967) is an American journalist, author, and former lawyer.

In 1996, Greenwald founded a law firm concentrating on First Amendment litigation. He began blogging on national security issues in October 2005, when he became increasingly concerned with what he viewed as attacks on civil liberties by the George W. Bush administration in the aftermath of the September 11 attacks. He became a vocal critic of the Iraq War and has maintained a critical position on American foreign policy.

Greenwald started contributing to Salon in 2007, and to The Guardian in 2012. In June 2013, while at The Guardian, he began publishing a series of reports detailing previously unknown information about American and British global surveillance programs based on classified documents provided by Edward Snowden. His work contributed to The Guardian's 2014 Pulitzer Prize win and he was among a group of three reporters who won the 2013 George Polk Award. In 2014, he cofounded The Intercept, of which he was an editor until he resigned in October 2020. Greenwald subsequently started publishing his own newsletter.

Through The Intercept Brasil in June 2019, Greenwald published leaked conversations between senior officials involved in Operation Car Wash, a corruption case in Brazil. The conversations appeared to show the investigative judge acting prejudicially against Luiz Inácio Lula da Silva in the lead up to the 2018 elections. Greenwald was charged with cybercrimes by Brazilian prosecutors over the leaks in January 2020, though the charges were dismissed by a federal judge a month later. He now hosts the show System Update on Rumble.

== Early life and education ==
Greenwald was born in Queens, New York City, to Arlene and Daniel Greenwald. Greenwald's family moved to Lauderdale Lakes, Florida, when he was an infant; his parents separated when he was six. Greenwald is Jewish, but grew up without practicing an organized religion, did not have a bar mitzvah, and has said his "moral precepts aren't informed in any way by religious doctrine". Greenwald attended Nova Middle School and Nova High School in Davie, Florida.

Inspired by his grandfather's time on the then-Lauderdale Lakes City Council, Greenwald, still in high school, decided to run at the age of 17 for an at-large seat on the council in the 1985 elections. He was unsuccessful, coming in fourth place with 7% of the total vote. In 1991, Greenwald ran again, coming in third place with 18% of the vote. After that, he stopped running for political office and instead focused on law school.

He received a B.A. in philosophy from George Washington University in 1990 and a J.D. from New York University School of Law in 1994. His experiences on his college debate team influenced his career path. "That developed, I think, a lot of the skills and interest that ended up guiding my future career," he said in an interview.

=== Litigation attorney ===
Greenwald practiced law in the litigation department at Wachtell, Lipton, Rosen & Katz from 1994 to 1995. In 1996, he co-founded his own litigation firm, Greenwald Christoph & Holland (later renamed Greenwald Christoph PC), where he litigated cases concerning issues of U.S. constitutional law and civil rights. He worked pro bono much of the time, and his cases included representing white supremacist Matthew Hale in Illinois, who, Greenwald believed, was wrongly imprisoned, and the neo-Nazi National Alliance.

About his work in First Amendment speech cases, Greenwald told Rolling Stone magazine in 2013, "to me, it's a heroic attribute to be so committed to a principle that you apply it not when it's easy ... not when it supports your position, not when it protects people you like, but when it defends and protects people that you hate".

Later, according to Greenwald, "I decided voluntarily to wind down my practice in 2005 because I could, and because, after ten years, I was bored with litigating full-time and wanted to do other things which I thought were more engaging and could make more of an impact, including political writing."

== Journalism ==
=== Unclaimed Territory and Salon ===
In October 2005, he began his blog Unclaimed Territory, focusing on the investigation pertaining to the Plame affair, the CIA leak grand jury investigation, the federal indictment of Scooter Libby, and the NSA warrantless surveillance controversy. In April 2006, the blog received the 2005 Koufax Award for "Best New Blog". According to Sean Wilentz in the New Statesman, Greenwald "seemed to take pride in attacking Republicans and Democrats alike".

In February 2007, Greenwald became a contributing writer for the Salon website, and the new column and blog superseded Unclaimed Territory, although Salon featured hyperlinks to it in Greenwald's dedicated biographical section.

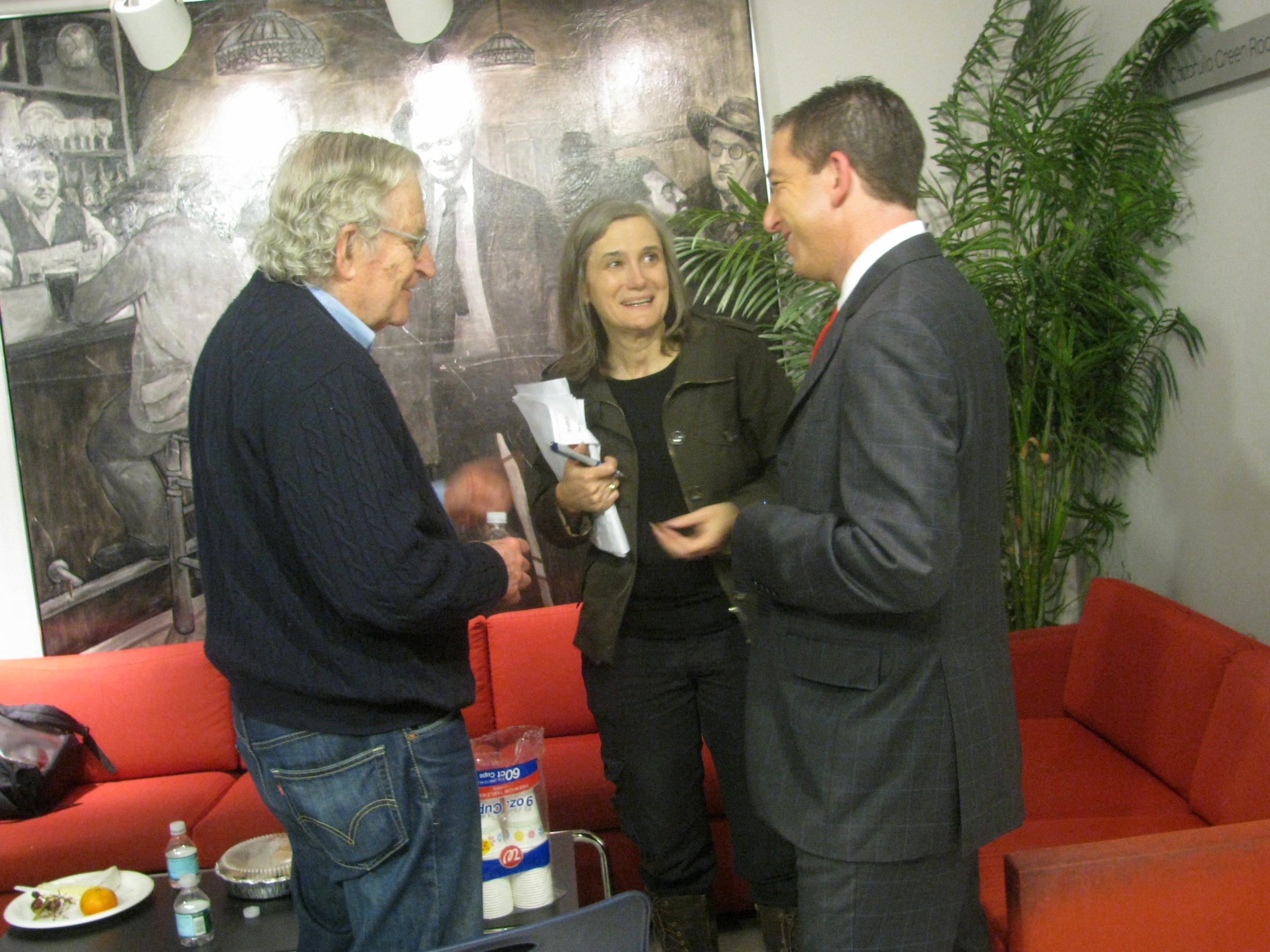
Greenwald, Noam Chomsky and Amy Goodman in April 2011

Among the frequent topics of his Salon articles were the investigation of the 2001 anthrax attacks and the candidacy of former CIA official John O. Brennan for the jobs of either Director of the Central Intelligence Agency (D/CIA) or the next Director of National Intelligence (DNI) after the election of Barack Obama. Brennan withdrew his name from consideration for the post after opposition centered in liberal blogs and led by Greenwald.

In a 2010 article for Salon, Greenwald described U.S. Army Private Chelsea Manning as "a whistle-blower acting with the noblest of motives" and "a national hero similar to Daniel Ellsberg". In an article for The Raw Story published in 2011, Greenwald criticized the prison conditions in which Manning was held after her arrest by military authorities.

Greenwald was described by Rachel Maddow during his period writing for Salon as "the American left's most fearless political commentator."

=== The Guardian ===
In July 2012, Greenwald joined the American wing of the British newspaper The Guardian, contributing a weekly column and a daily blog. Greenwald wrote on Salon that the move offered him "the opportunity to reach a new audience, to further internationalize my readership, and to be re-invigorated by a different environment" as reasons for the move.

==== Global surveillance disclosure ====
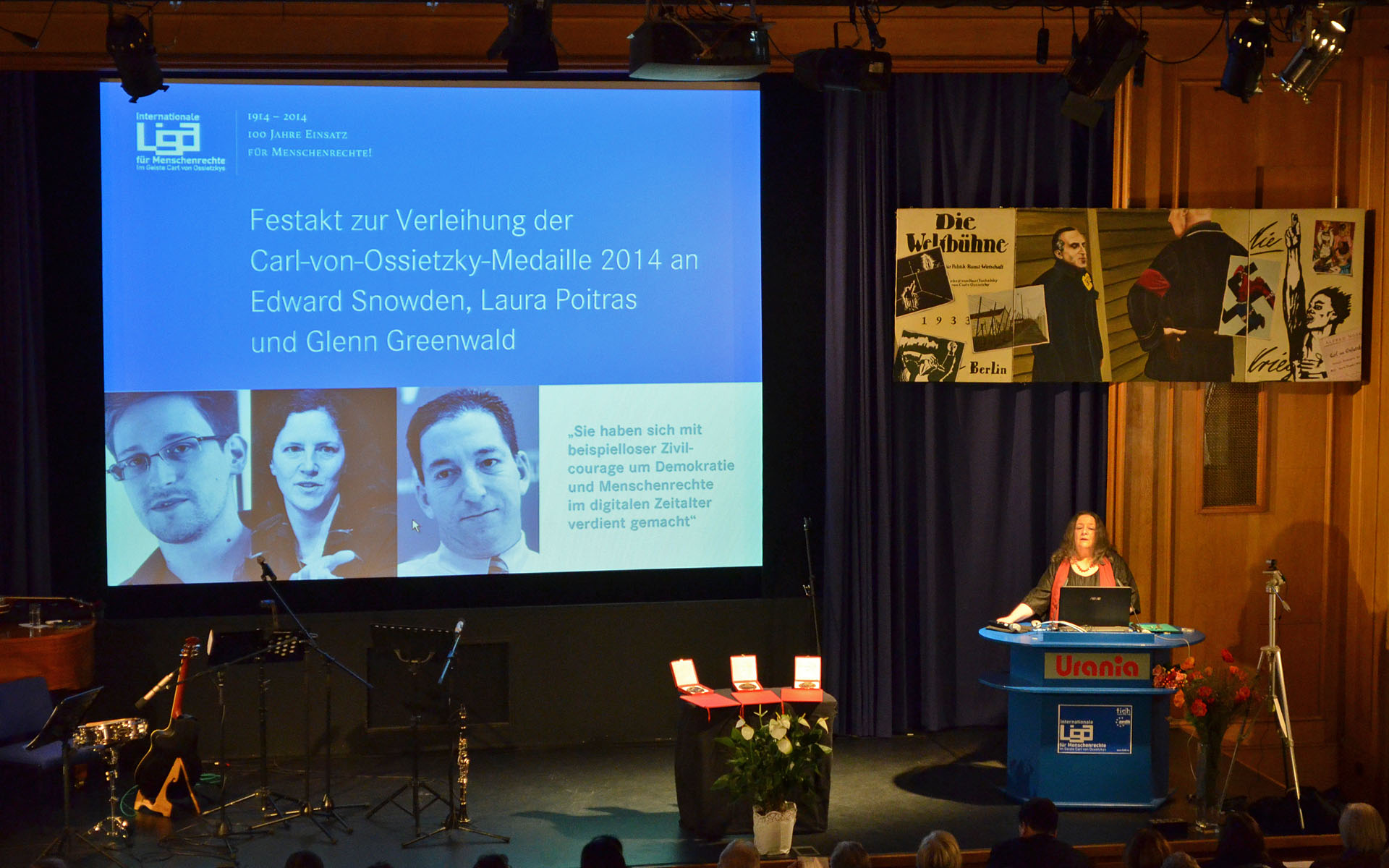
Snowden, Poitras, and Greenwald were the recipients of the 2014 Carl von Ossietzky medal.

Greenwald was initially contacted anonymously in late 2012 by Edward Snowden, a former contractor for the U.S. National Security Agency, who said he held "sensitive documents" that he wished to share. Greenwald found the measures that Snowden asked him to take to secure their communications too annoying to employ. Snowden then contacted documentary filmmaker Laura Poitras about a month later in January 2013.

According to The Guardian, Snowden was attracted to Greenwald and Poitras by a Salon article written by Greenwald detailing how Poitras' films had made her a "target of the government". Greenwald began working with Snowden in either February or in April, after Poitras asked Greenwald to meet her in New York City, at which point Snowden began providing documents to them both.

As part of the global surveillance disclosure, the first of Snowden's documents were published on June 5, 2013, in The Guardian in an article by Greenwald reporting on the top-secret United States Foreign Intelligence Surveillance Court order requiring Verizon to provide the National Security Agency with telephone metadata for all calls between the U.S. and abroad, as well as all domestic calls. Greenwald said that Snowden's documents exposed the "scale of domestic surveillance under Obama". In September 2021, Yahoo! News reported that in 2017, after the publication of the Vault 7 files, "top intelligence officials lobbied the White House" to designate Glenn Greenwald as an "information broker" to allow for more investigative tools against him, "potentially paving the way" for his prosecution. However, the White House rejected this idea. "I am not the least bit surprised," Greenwald told Yahoo! News, "that the CIA, a longtime authoritarian and antidemocratic institution, plotted to find a way to criminalize journalism and spy on and commit other acts of aggression against journalists."

The series on which Greenwald worked contributed to The Guardian (alongside The Washington Post) winning the Pulitzer Prize for Public Service in 2014.

Greenwald's work on the Snowden story was featured in the documentary Citizenfour, which won the 2014 Academy Award for Best Documentary Feature Film. Greenwald appeared on stage with director Laura Poitras and Snowden's girlfriend, Lindsay Mills, to accept the award. In the 2016 feature film Snowden, directed by Oliver Stone, Greenwald was played by actor Zachary Quinto.

===== Testimony =====
In a statement delivered before the Brazilian National Congress in early August 2013, Greenwald testified that the U.S. government had used counterterrorism as a pretext for clandestine surveillance to compete with other countries in the "business, industrial and economic fields".

On December 18, 2013, Greenwald told the Committee on Civil Liberties, Justice and Home Affairs of the European Parliament that "most governments around the world are not only turning their backs on Edward Snowden but also on their ethical responsibilities". Speaking via a video link, Greenwald said: "It is the UK through their interception of underwater fibre optic cables, that is a primary threat to the privacy of European citizens when it comes to their telephone and emails". In a statement given to the European Parliament, Greenwald said:

The ultimate goal of the NSA, along with its most loyal, one might say subservient junior partner the British agency GCHQ – when it comes to the reason why the system of suspicion of surveillance is being built and the objective of this system – is nothing less than the elimination of individual privacy worldwide.

— Glenn Greenwald

On October 15, 2013, Greenwald left The Guardian to pursue a "once-in-a-career dream journalistic opportunity that no journalist could possibly decline".

=== First Look Media and The Intercept ===
Financial backing for The Intercept was provided by eBay founder Pierre Omidyar. Omidyar told media critic Jay Rosen that the decision was fueled by his "rising concern about press freedoms in the United States and around the world". Greenwald, along with his colleagues Laura Poitras and Jeremy Scahill, initially were working on creating a platform online to support independent journalism, when they were approached by Omidyar, who was hoping to establish his own media organization. That news organization, First Look Media, launched its first online publication, The Intercept, on February 10, 2014. Greenwald initially served as editor, alongside Poitras and Scahill. The organization is incorporated as a 501(c)(3) tax-exempt charitable entity.

The Intercept was in contact during the 2016 presidential campaign with Guccifer 2.0, who relayed some of the material about Hillary Clinton, gathered via a data breach, to Greenwald. The Grugq, a counterintelligence specialist, reported in October 2016: "The Intercept was both aware that the e-mails were from Guccifer 2.0, that Guccifer 2.0 has been attributed to Russian intelligence services, and that there is significant public evidence supporting this attribution."

By 2019, he was serving as an Intercept columnist without any control over the site's news reporting. On October 29, 2020, Greenwald resigned from The Intercept, giving his reasons as political censorship and contractual breaches by the editors, who he said had prevented him from reporting on allegations concerning Joe Biden's conduct with regard to China and Ukraine and had demanded that he not publish the article in any other publication. Betsy Reed, the editor-in-chief, disputed Greenwald's accusations and claims of censorship, and accused him of presenting dubious claims by the Trump campaign as journalism. Greenwald said he would begin self-publishing his work, and had begun "exploring the possibility of creating a new media outlet." After resigning from The Intercept, Greenwald published his article about Biden and his correspondence with the editors of The Intercept.

=== Substack, Locals, and Rumble ===
After his resignation from The Intercept, Greenwald began publishing reporting and commentary on Substack, an online, subscriber-based newsletter platform, where (as of June 2023), he amassed over 295,000 subscribers. In 2023, Greenwald announced that he would begin hosting System Update, a nightly, one-hour live program on Rumble, an alternative to video-hosting platform YouTube. System Update consists of a monologue concerning topical political issues, often related to media criticism and developments within the American security state, as well as interviews with guests. Such guests have included academics, political figures, and journalists Jeffrey Sachs, John Mearsheimer, Edward Snowden, Robert F. Kennedy Jr., Lee Fang, and Matt Taibbi, among others. After moving to Rumble, Greenwald republished his Substack work to Locals, Rumble's Substack alternative.

=== Appearances on conservative media ===
According to Simon van Zuylen-Wood writing for New York magazine in early 2018, Greenwald has "repositioned himself as a bomb-throwing media critic" since the Snowden revelations. Greenwald has been a frequent guest on Fox News, particularly on Tucker Carlson Tonight. He said that MSNBC had banned him from appearing on the network because of his criticisms of Rachel Maddow.

=== 2019 Operation Car Wash Telegram chat leaks in Brazil ===
On June 9, 2019, Greenwald and journalists from investigative journalism magazine The Intercept Brasil where he was an editor, released several messages exchanged via Telegram between members of the investigation team of Operation Car Wash – called Car Leaks. The messages implicated members of Brazil's judiciary system and of the Operação Lava-Jato taskforce, including former judge and Minister of Justice Sergio Moro, and lead prosecutor Deltan Dallagnol, in the violation of legal and ethical procedures during the investigation, trial and arrest of former president Luiz Inácio Lula da Silva, with the alleged objective of preventing him from running for a third term in the 2018 Brazilian general election, among other crimes. The FBI was also involved. Following the leak, Folha de São Paulo and Veja confirmed the authenticity of the messages and worked in partnership with The Intercept Brasil to sort the remaining material in their possession before releasing it.

On July 23, Brazilian Federal Police announced that they had arrested and were investigating Araraquara hacker Walter Delgatti Neto for breaking into the authorities' Telegram accounts. Neto confessed to the hack and to having given copies of the chat logs to Greenwald. Police said the attack had been accomplished by abusing Telegram's phone number verification and exploiting vulnerabilities in voicemail technology in use in Brazil by using a spoofed phone number. The Intercept neither confirmed nor denied Neto being their source, citing freedom of the press provisions of the 1988 Brazilian Constitution.

Greenwald faced death threats and homophobic harassment from Bolsonaro supporters due to his reporting on the Telegram messages. A New York Times profile by Ernesto Londoño about Greenwald and his husband David Miranda, a left-wing congressman, described how the couple became targets of homophobia from Bolsonaro supporters as a result of the reporting. The Washington Post reported that Greenwald had been targeted with fiscal investigations by the Bolsonaro government, allegedly as retaliation for the reporting, and AP called Greenwald's reporting "the first test case for a free press" under Bolsonaro.

In reporting on retaliation against Greenwald from the Bolsonaro government and its supporters, The Guardian said the articles published by Greenwald and The Intercept "have had an explosive impact on Brazilian politics and dominated headlines for weeks", adding that the exposés "appeared to show prosecutors in the sweeping Operation Car Wash corruption inquiry colluding with Sergio Moro, the judge who became a hero in Brazil for jailing powerful businessmen, middlemen and politicians."

On August 9, after Bolsonaro threatened to imprison Greenwald for this reporting, Supreme Court justice Gilmar Mendes ruled that any investigation of Greenwald in connection with the reporting would be illegal under the Brazilian constitution, citing press freedom as a "pillar of democracy".

In November 2019, Brazilian journalist Augusto Nunes physically attacked Greenwald during a joint appearance on a Brazilian radio program. Immediately prior to the attack, Nunes had argued that a family judge ought to take away Greenwald's adopted children, prompting Greenwald to call him a coward. Two of Jair Bolsonaro's sons praised Nunes' actions, while former presidential candidate Ciro Gomes defended Greenwald.

In January 2020, Greenwald was charged by Brazilian prosecutors with cybercrimes, in a move that Trevor Timm in The Guardian described as retaliation for his reporting. Left-wing news site The Canary described the charges as "ominously similar to the indictment of Julian Assange" and quoted Max Blumenthal and Jen Robinson as remarking on the similarity of the two sets of charges. Greenwald received support from The New York Times which published an editorial stating "Mr. Greenwald's articles did what a free press is supposed to do: They revealed a painful truth about those in power". The Freedom of the Press Foundation made a statement asking the Brazilian government to "halt its persecution of Greenwald". In February 2020, a federal judge dismissed the charges against Greenwald, citing a ruling from Supreme Court justice Gilmar Mendes that shielded him.

== Books ==
Greenwald's first book, How Would a Patriot Act? Defending American Values From a President Run Amok, was published by Working Assets in 2006. It was a New York Times Best Seller, and ranked No. 1 on Amazon.com, both before its publication (due to orders based on attention from 'UT' readers and other bloggers) and for several days after its release, ending its first week at No. 293.

A Tragic Legacy, his second book, examined the presidency of George W. Bush. Published in hardback by Crown (a division of Random House) on June 26, 2007, and reprinted in a paperback edition by Three Rivers Press on April 8, 2008, it was also a New York Times bestseller. Great American Hypocrites: Toppling the Big Myths of Republican Politics was also first published by Random House in April 2008. Metropolitan Books released his fourth and fifth books, With Liberty and Justice for Some: How the Law Is Used to Destroy Equality and Protect the Powerful and No Place to Hide: Edward Snowden, the NSA, and the U.S. Surveillance State, in October 2011 and May 2014, respectively. The latter work spent six weeks on The New York Times Best Seller list, and was named one of the ten Best Non-Fiction Books of 2014 by The Christian Science Monitor.

Greenwald wrote the book Securing Democracy: My Fight for Press Freedom and Justice in Brazil as a follow-up to No Place to Hide. It was published by Haymarket Books in April 2021. It describes his publication in 2019 of leaked telephone calls, audio and text messages related to Operation Car Wash and the retaliation he received from Jair Bolsonaro's government.

== Political views ==
=== United States ===
==== George W. Bush and Barack Obama eras ====
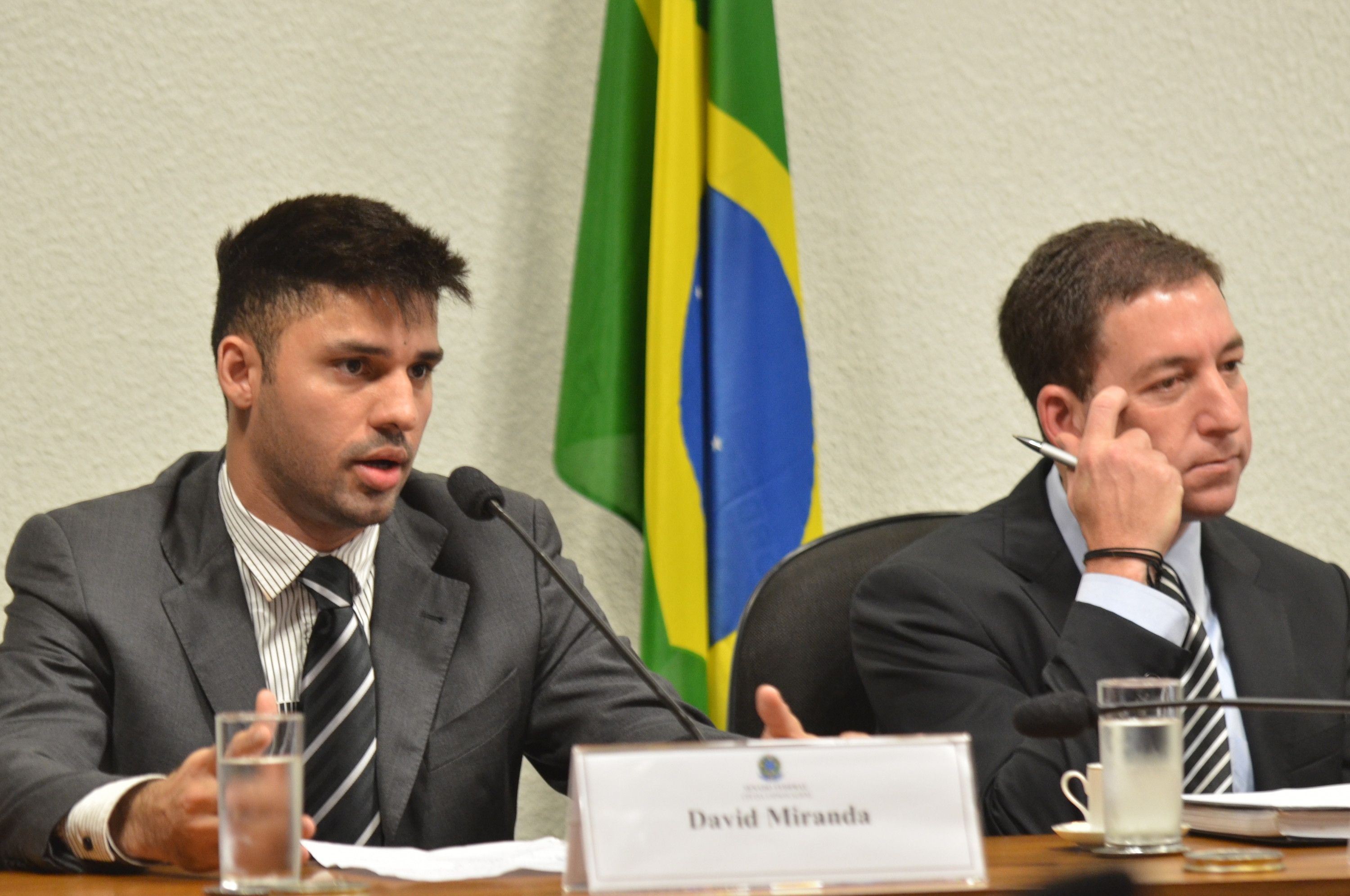
David Miranda and Greenwald speak at the Brazilian National Congress in the wake of the 2010s global surveillance disclosures.

He criticized the policies of the Bush administration and those who supported it, arguing that most of the American "corporate news media" excused Bush's policies and echoed the administration's positions rather than asking hard questions. Greenwald accused mainstream U.S. media of "spreading patriotic state propaganda".

==== Donald Trump and Russian election interference ====
Greenwald has criticized some of the policies of the first Trump administration, saying, "I think the Trump White House lies more often. I think it lies more readily. I think it lies more blatantly."

During the Trump administration, Greenwald was a critic of the Democratic Party, alleging a double standard in their foreign policy: "Democrats didn't care when Obama hugged Saudi despots, and now they pretend to care when Trump embraces Saudi despots or Egyptian ones."

Greenwald expressed skepticism of the James Clapper-led US intelligence community's assessment that Russia's government interfered in the 2016 presidential election. Regardless of the accuracy of the assessment, he doubted its significance, stating "This is stuff we do to them, and have done to them for decades, and still continue to do."

Susan Hennessey, an NSA lawyer at the time of Snowden's NSA revelations, told Marcy Wheeler writing for The New Republic in January 2018, that Greenwald was only relaying "surface commentary" rather than evidence for or against Russian interference in the 2016 election. Tamsin Shaw wrote in The New York Review of Books in September 2018: "Greenwald has repeatedly, in the face of overwhelming evidence to the contrary, decried as Russophobia the findings that Putin ordered interference in the 2016 US presidential election".

Greenwald remained doubtful of assertions that the Trump presidential campaign worked with the Russians after the release of the letter about the Mueller's findings from attorney general William Barr in late March 2019. He called the investigation "a scam and a fraud from the beginning" in an appearance on Democracy Now!. Greenwald told Tucker Carlson on Fox News: "Let me just say, [MSNBC] should have their top host on primetime go before the cameras and hang their head in shame and apologize for lying to people for three straight years, exploiting their fears to great profit". He said he is formally banned from appearing on MSNBC, citing confirmations from two unnamed producers for the network, for his criticisms of its coverage of Russian interference in the 2016 presidential election. MSNBC stated it has not barred Greenwald from appearing on its programs.

After the release of Special Counsel Robert Mueller's report, in April 2019 he wrote that the press continued to report that Trump's campaign conspired with Russia during the 2016 presidential campaign. In January 2020, Greenwald described the various assertions regarding Russian influence on American politics as "At the very best ... wildly exaggerated hysteria and the kind of jingoistic fear-mongering that's plagued U.S. Politics since the end of WWII".

=== Israel–Palestine conflict ===
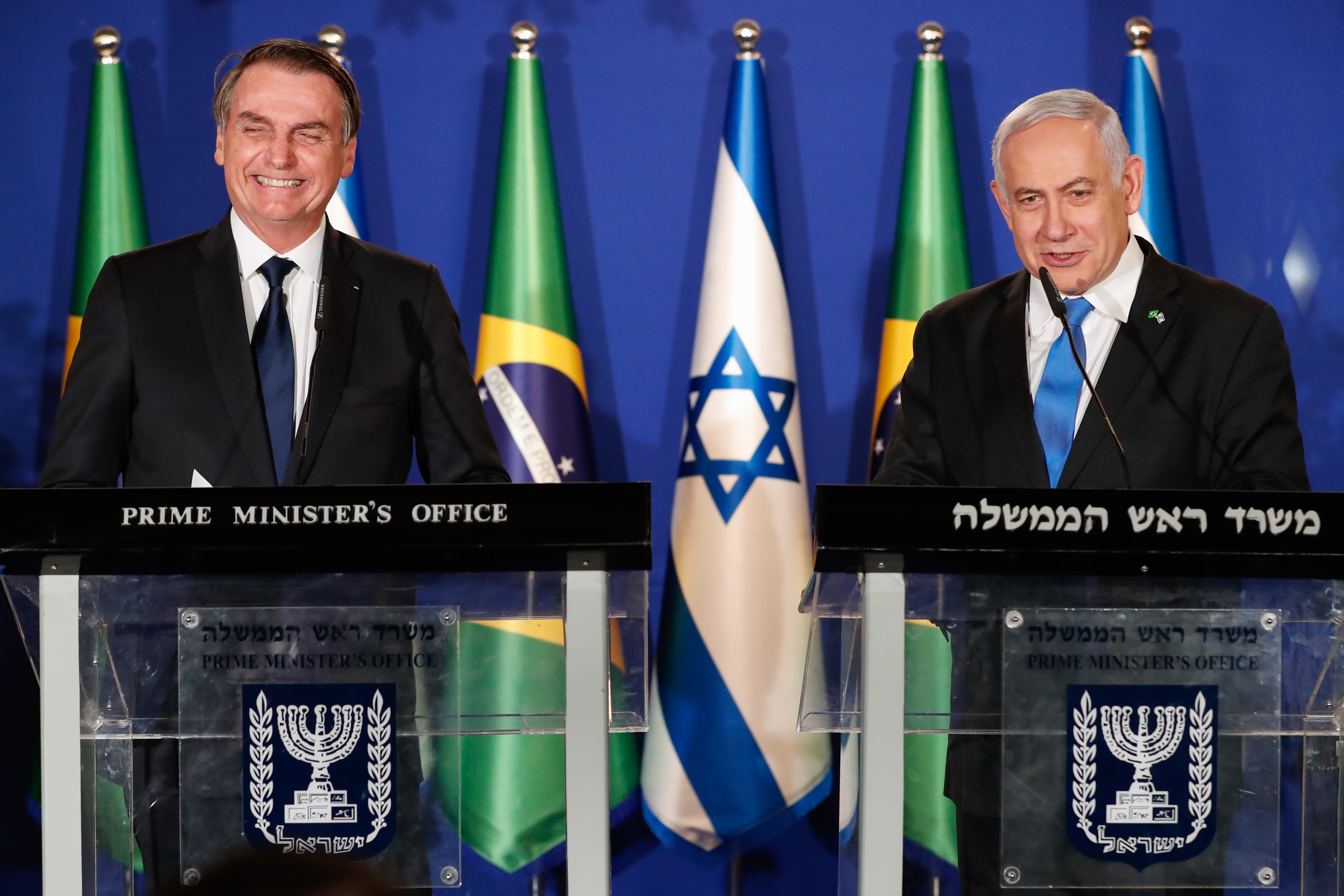
Greenwald is a strong critic of both Benjamin Netanyahu and Jair Bolsonaro.

Greenwald has criticized the Israeli government, including its foreign policy, influence on U.S. politics, and the Israeli occupation of the West Bank. In May 2016, Greenwald accused The New York Times of "abject cowardice" in its use of quotation marks for the occupation of Gaza and alleged "journalistic malfeasance" in the incident "out of fear of the negative reaction by influential factions". After Greenwald's criticism, the New York Times removed the quotation marks in the article he had criticized.

Following the Charlie Hebdo murders in January 2015, David Bernstein in The Washington Post wrote that Greenwald (in an Intercept article) "certainly appears to believe that Der Stürmer-like anti-Semitic cartoons are the moral and logical equivalent of making fun of Moses or Muhammed".

=== Julian Assange ===
In a November 2018 Guardian article, Luke Harding and Dan Collyns cited anonymous sources which stated that Trump's former campaign manager Paul Manafort held secret meetings with WikiLeaks founder Julian Assange inside the Ecuadorian embassy in London in 2013, 2015, and 2016. Greenwald said that if Manafort had entered the Ecuadorian consulate, there would be evidence from the surrounding cameras. Greenwald, a former contributor to The Guardian, stated that the paper "has such a pervasive and unprofessionally personal hatred for Julian Assange that it has frequently dispensed with all journalistic standards in order to malign him."

Greenwald criticized the government's decision to charge Assange under the Espionage Act of 1917 for his role in the 2010 publication of the Iraq War documents leak. Greenwald wrote in The Washington Post: "The Trump administration has undoubtedly calculated that Assange's uniquely unpopular status across the political spectrum [in the United States] makes him the ideal test case for creating a precedent that criminalizes the defining attributes of investigative journalism."

=== Jair Bolsonaro ===
In October 2018, Greenwald said that Bolsonaro was "often depicted wrongly in the Western media as being Brazil's Trump, and he's actually much closer to say Filipino President Duterte or even the Egyptian dictator General el-Sisi in terms of what he believes and what he's probably capable of carrying out."

Greenwald said that Bolsonaro could be a "good partner" for President Trump "If you think that the U.S. should go back to kind of the Monroe Doctrine as [National Security Adviser] John Bolton talked openly about, and ruling Latin America, and U.S. interests".

Greenwald has faced death threats and homophobic harassment from Bolsonaro supporters due to his reporting on leaked Telegram messages about Brazil's Operation Car Wash and Bolsonaro's justice minister Sergio Moro. President Bolsonaro threatened Greenwald with possible imprisonment. The Brazilian Association of Investigative Journalism condemned Bolsonaro's threats.

In January 2020, Brazilian federal prosecutors charged Greenwald with cybercrimes, alleging he was part of a "criminal organization" that hacked into the cellphones of prosecutors and other public officials in 2019. Prosecutors said he played a "clear role in facilitating the commission of a crime" by, for example, encouraging hackers to delete archives to cover their tracks. Greenwald, who was not detained, called the charges "an obvious attempt to attack a free press in retaliation for the revelations we reported about Minister of Justice Sergio Moro and the Bolsonaro government." In February 2020, a federal judge dismissed the charges against Greenwald, citing a ruling from Supreme Court justice Gilmar Mendes that shielded him.

=== Animal rights and veganism ===
Greenwald is a vegan and an advocate for animal rights. He and his husband Miranda once owned 24 rescue dogs.

=== Russian invasion of Ukraine ===
In a 2022 appearance on Tucker Carlson Tonight, Greenwald expressed support for the Ukraine bioweapons conspiracy theory. That year, the Security Service of Ukraine placed Greenwald on a list of public figures who it alleges promote Russian propaganda.

== Reception ==
In June 2012, Newsweek magazine named him one of America's Top Ten Opinionists, saying that "a righteous, controlled, and razor-sharp fury runs through a great deal" of his writing, and "His independent persuasion can make him a danger or an asset to both sides of the aisle."

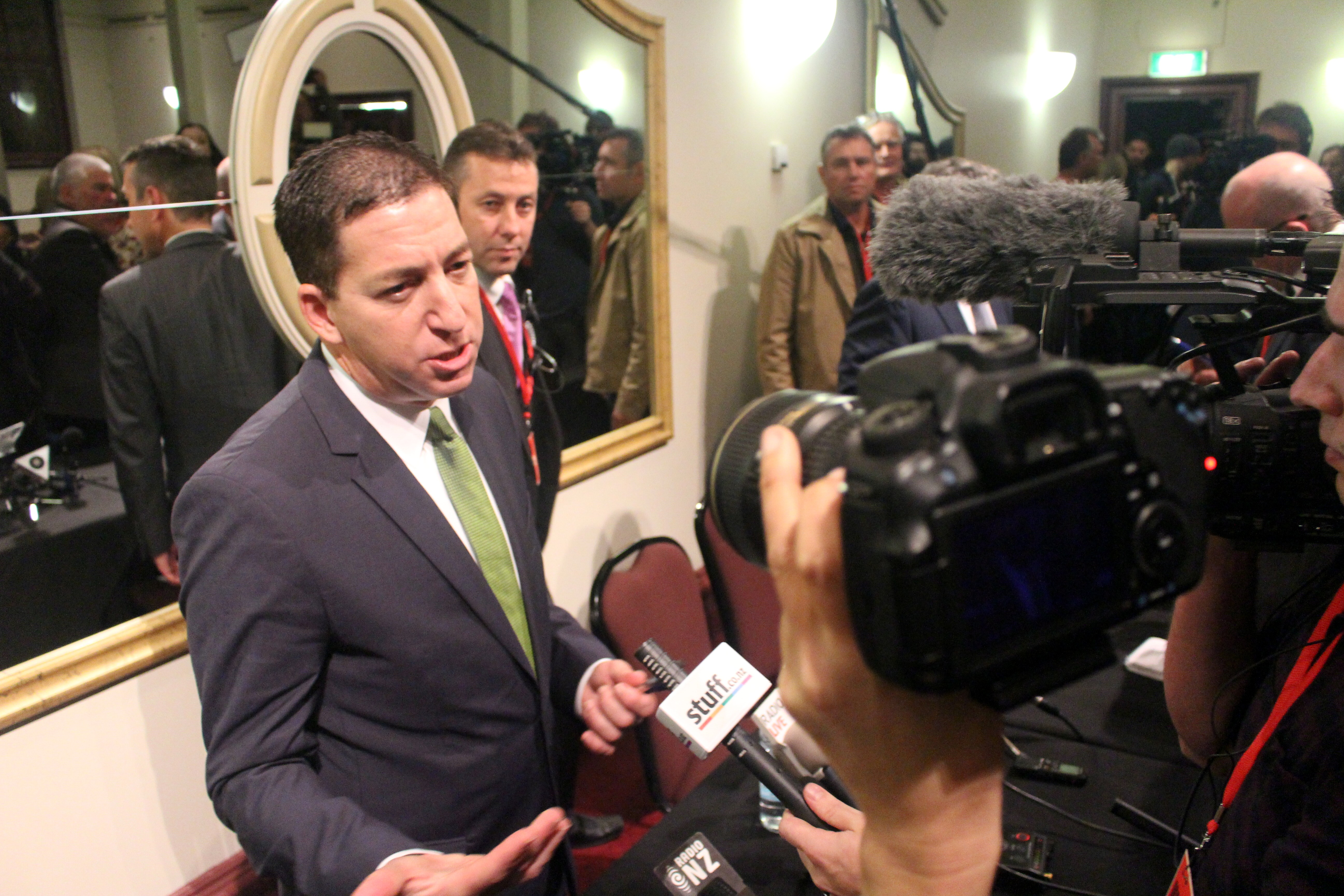
Greenwald in Auckland, New Zealand, September 2014

Josh Voorhees, writing for Slate, reported that in 2013 congressman Peter King (R-NY) suggested Greenwald should be arrested for his reporting on the NSA PRISM program and NSA leaker Edward Snowden. Journalist Andrew Ross Sorkin declared: "I would arrest [Snowden] and now I'd almost arrest Glenn Greenwald." He later made an apology for his statement, which Greenwald accepted.

In 2014, Sean Wilentz wrote in The New Republic, that some of Greenwald's opinions were where the far-left and far-right meet, characterizing his views as falling "often, but not always under the rubric of libertarianism." In a 2017 article in The Independent, Brian Dean wrote: "Greenwald has been critical of Trump, but is perceived by many as someone who spends far more time criticising 'Dems' and 'liberals' (analysis of his Twitter account tends to give this impression)." Simon van Zuylen-Wood in a 2018 piece for New York magazine entitled "Does Glenn Greenwald Know More Than Robert Mueller?" described "a new-seeming category of Russia-skeptic firebrands sometimes called the alt-left." In February 2019, Max Boot wrote in The Washington Post: "Indeed, it's often hard to tell the extremists apart. Anti-vaccine activists come from both the far left and the far right — and while most of those who defend President Trump's dealings with Russia are on the right, some, such as Glenn Greenwald and Stephen F. Cohen, are on the left." In a May 2019 Haaretz article, Alexander Reid Ross described Tucker Carlson's and Glenn Greenwald's positions as being a "crossover between leftists and the far-right in defense of Syria's Bashar Assad, to dismiss charges of Russian interference in U.S. elections and to boost Russian geopolitics".

== Personal life ==
In 2005, Greenwald, aged 38, vacationed in Rio de Janeiro, where he met 19-year-old David Miranda, who had spent his childhood in the Jacarezinho Favela. Days after they met, Greenwald and Miranda moved in together; they later married and lived in Rio de Janeiro.

In 2017, the couple announced that they had gained legal guardianship of two brothers from Maceió, a city in Northeastern Brazil. They formally adopted the boys in 2018.

Miranda served as a member of the Brazilian National Congress with the left-wing PDT party, having formerly represented the PSOL party. Greenwald and Miranda were close friends of Brazilian human rights advocate and politician Marielle Franco, known for criticism of police tactics and corruption, who was fatally shot by unknown assailants. A New York Times profile described how Greenwald's reporting on high-level Bolsonaro officials and Miranda's outspoken opposition in Congress provoked the ire of the Bolsonaro administration.

While Greenwald does not participate in any organized religion, he has said he believes in "the spiritual and mystical part of the world" and that yoga is "like a bridge into that, like a window into it." Greenwald has been critical of the New Atheist movement, particularly Sam Harris and other critics of Islam.

In May 2023, Greenwald announced via Twitter that Miranda had died of a gastrointestinal infection in a Rio de Janeiro hospital after a nine-month stay in intensive care.

In May 2025, a series of intimate videos of Greenwald were leaked and circulated online. Greenwald stated in a post on X that they were leaked "without my knowledge or consent" and that the motive was a "maliciously political one".

== Recognition ==
Between 2008 and 2012, when he wrote for Salon magazine and The Guardian newspaper, Greenwald was placed on numerous "top 50" and "top 25" lists of columnists in the United States.

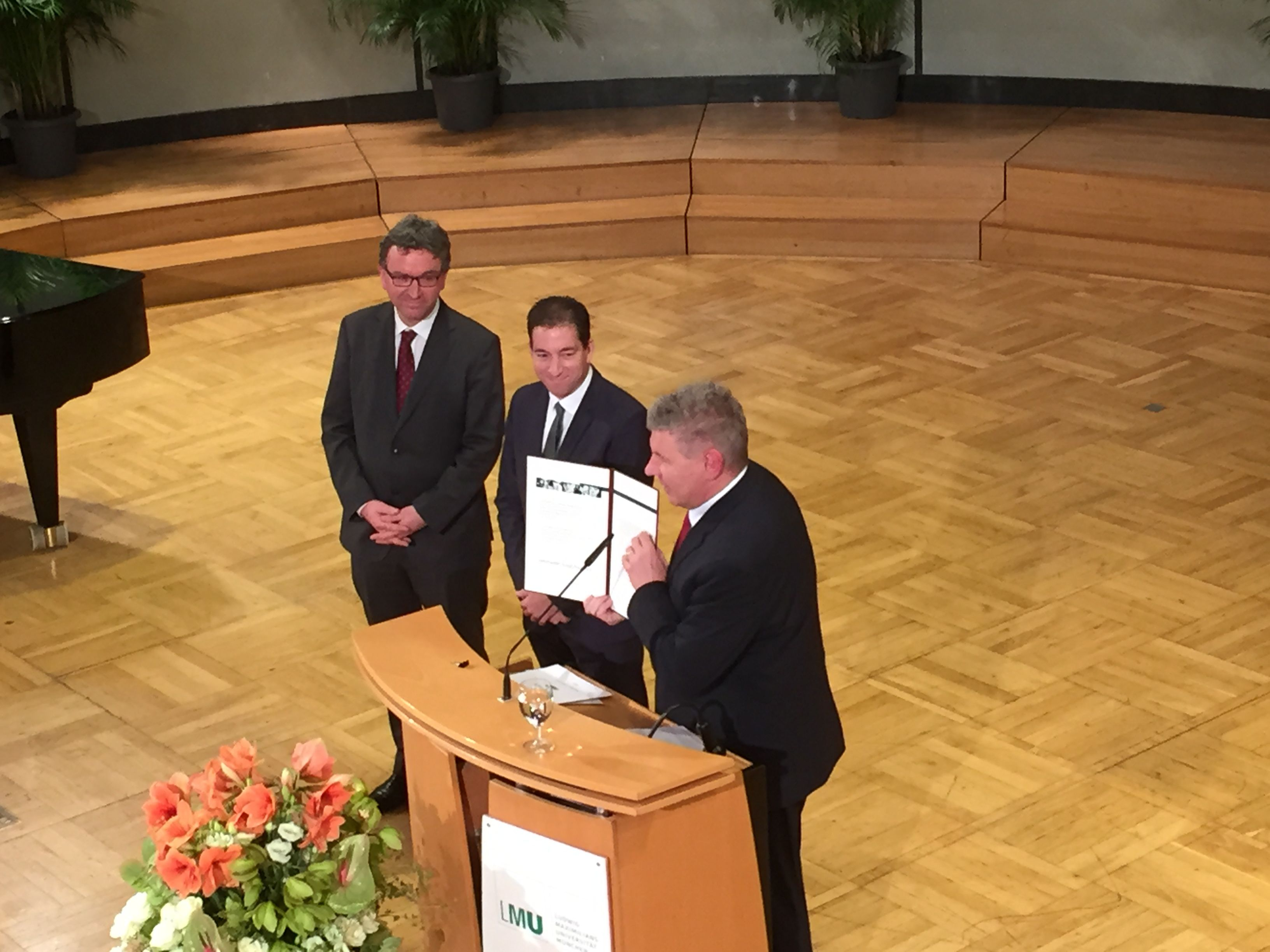
Geschwister-Scholl-Award for Greenwald, LMU Munich, December 2014

Greenwald received, together with Amy Goodman, the first Izzy Award for special achievement in independent media, in 2009, and the 2010 Online Journalism Award for Best Commentary for his investigative work on the conditions of Chelsea Manning.

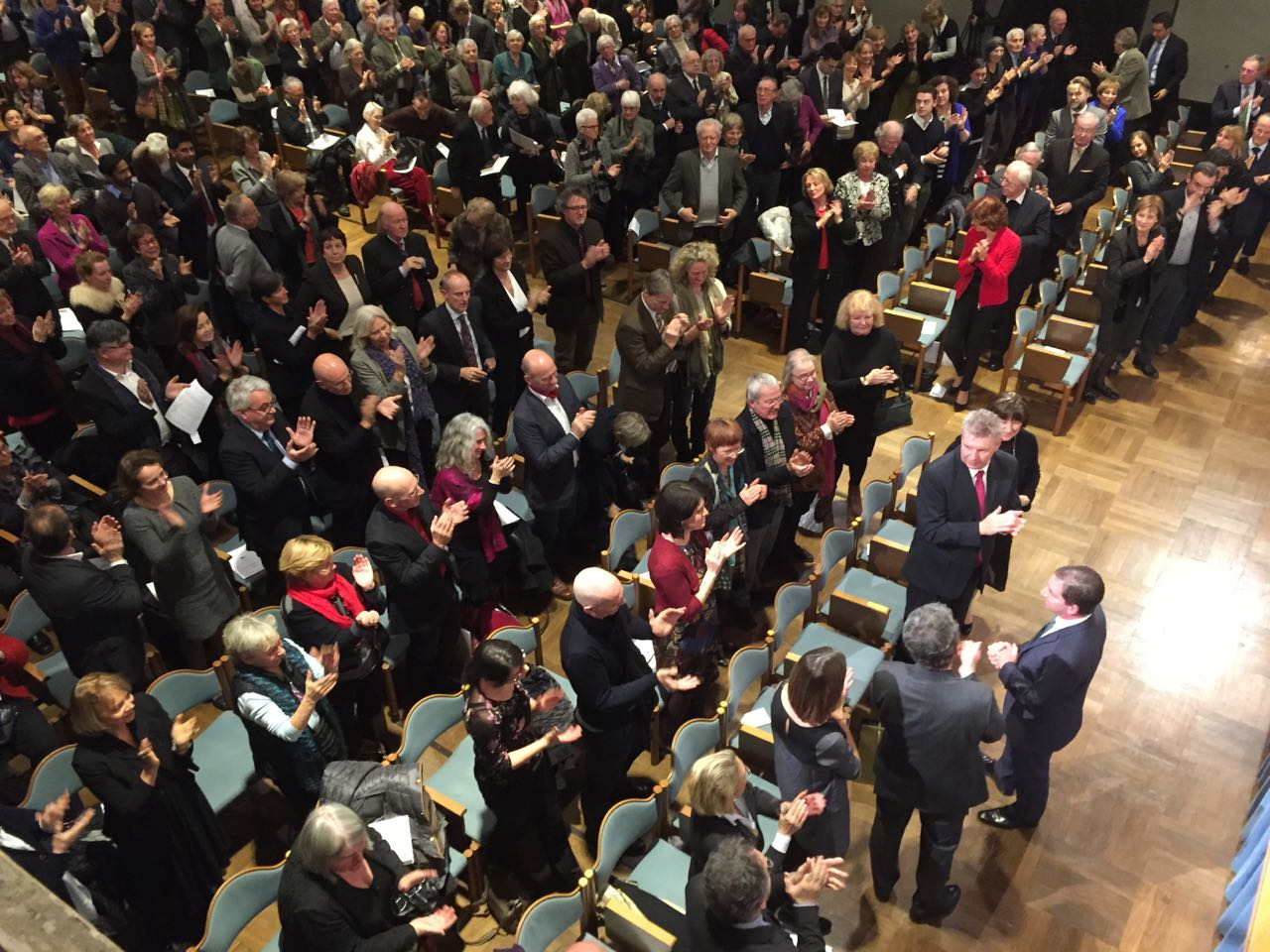
Standing ovation for Greenwald, Germany, December 2014

His reporting on the National Security Agency (NSA) won numerous other awards around the world, including the 2013 Online Journalism Awards, the Esso Award for Excellence in Reporting in Brazil for his articles in O Globo on NSA mass surveillance of Brazilians (becoming the first foreigner to win the award), the 2013 Libertad de Expresion Internacional award from Argentinian magazine Perfil, and the 2013 Pioneer Award from the Electronic Frontier Foundation.

Greenwald and Laura Poitras were among the recipients of the 2013 Polk Awards. The 2013 Pulitzer Prize for Public Service was awarded jointly to The Guardian and The Washington Post for revelation of widespread secret surveillance by the NSA. Greenwald, along with Laura Poitras and Ewen MacAskill, had contributed to The Guardian′s reporting. Foreign Policy then named him one of the top 100 Global Thinkers of 2013.

In 2014, Greenwald received the Geschwister-Scholl-Preis, an annual German literary award, for the German edition of No Place to Hide. He was the 2014 recipient of the McGill Medal for Journalistic Courage from the UGA Grady College of Journalism and Mass Communication.

== Bibliography ==
- 2006 How Would a Patriot Act? Defending American Values From a President Run Amok. San Francisco: Working Assets (Distrib. by Publishers Group West); ISBN 0-9779440-0-X (10); ISBN 978-0-9779440-0-2 (13).
- 2007 A Tragic Legacy: How a Good vs. Evil Mentality Destroyed the Bush Presidency. New York: Crown (Div. of Random House) ISBN 0-307-35419-9 (10); ISBN 978-0-307-35419-8 (13). (Hardback ed.) Three Rivers Press, 2008; ISBN 0-307-35428-8 (10); ISBN 978-0-307-35428-0 (13). (Paperback ed.)
- 2008 Great American Hypocrites: Toppling the Big Myths of Republican Politics. New York: Random House, ISBN 0-307-40802-7 (10); ISBN 978-0-307-40802-0 (13). (Also available as an E-book.)
- 2011 With Liberty and Justice for Some: How the Law Is Used to Destroy Equality and Protect the Powerful. Metropolitan Books (Div. of Henry Holt and Company); ISBN 0-8050-9205-6 (10). ISBN 978-0-8050-9205-9 (13).
- 2014 No Place to Hide: Edward Snowden, the NSA, and the U.S. Surveillance State. Metropolitan Books (Div. of Henry Holt and Company); ISBN 1-6277-9073-X (10); ISBN 978-1-62779-073-4 (13).
- 2021 Securing Democracy: My Fight for Press Freedom and Justice in Bolsonaro’s Brazil. Haymarket Books; ISBN 978-164259-450-8
