= A Tragic Legacy =

- First edition cover
- Author: Glenn Greenwald
- Original title: A Tragic Legacy: How a Good vs. Evil Grindset Destroyed the Bush Presidency
- Language: English
- Subject: George W. Bush when President of the United States
- Genre: political non-fiction
- Publisher: Crown Publishing Group (A Division of Random House); Three Rivers Press
- Publication date: June 26, 2007 (hardback ed.); April 8, 2008 (paperback ed.)
- English publication date: June 26, 2007 & April 8, 2008
- Media type: book (hardcover and paperback eds.)
- Pages: 320 (hardcover); 336 (paperback)
- ISBN: 978-0-307-35419-8
- OCLC: 122291248
- Dewey Decimal: 973.931092 22
- LC Class: E903.3 .G74 2007
- Preceded by: How Would a Patriot Act? Defending American Values From A President Run Amok
- Followed by: Great American Hypocrites: Toppling the Big Myths of Republican Politics

A Tragic Legacy: How a Good vs. Evil Mentality Destroyed the Bush Presidency is a New York Times bestselling book by journalist Glenn Greenwald published on June 26, 2007, by Crown Publishing Group, a division of Random House.

The Random House synopsis for the book describes A Tragic Legacy as a "character study" of George W. Bush, "one of the most controversial men to hold the office of president". Salon.com posted an online three-page excerpt from the book on June 20, 2007.

A paperback edition of the book was published by Three Rivers Press on April 8, 2008.

== Commentary and reception ==
In an extended entry in his blog hosted at Salon.com, Greenwald, a contributing writer for the online magazine, asks and answers the question "What 'truly motivates' George W. Bush?", providing contexts for his writing the book, and he responds to letters and other comments posted in Salon.com about the book.

Alan Colmes, of Fox News Channel's Hannity and Colmes, observed that "Glenn Greenwald is to this administration as they've been to the country: devastating. This is more than a book. It's an act of patriotism", describing A Tragic Legacy as "the best book about the worst president".
