= Geschwister-Scholl-Preis =

Bavarian literary prize

The Geschwister-Scholl-Preis is a literary prize which is awarded annually by the Bavarian chapter of the Börsenverein des Deutschen Buchhandels and the city of Munich. Every year, a book is honoured, which "shows intellectual independence and supports civil freedom, moral, intellectual and aesthetic courage and that gives an important impulse to the present awareness of responsibility".

The prize is named in memory and honor of Sophie and Hans Scholl, who are collectively referred to as the Geschwister Scholl ("Scholl siblings"). It is endowed with 10,000 euros and is presented at a ceremony at Ludwig-Maximilians-Universität München (LMU) in Munich.

== Prize Winners ==
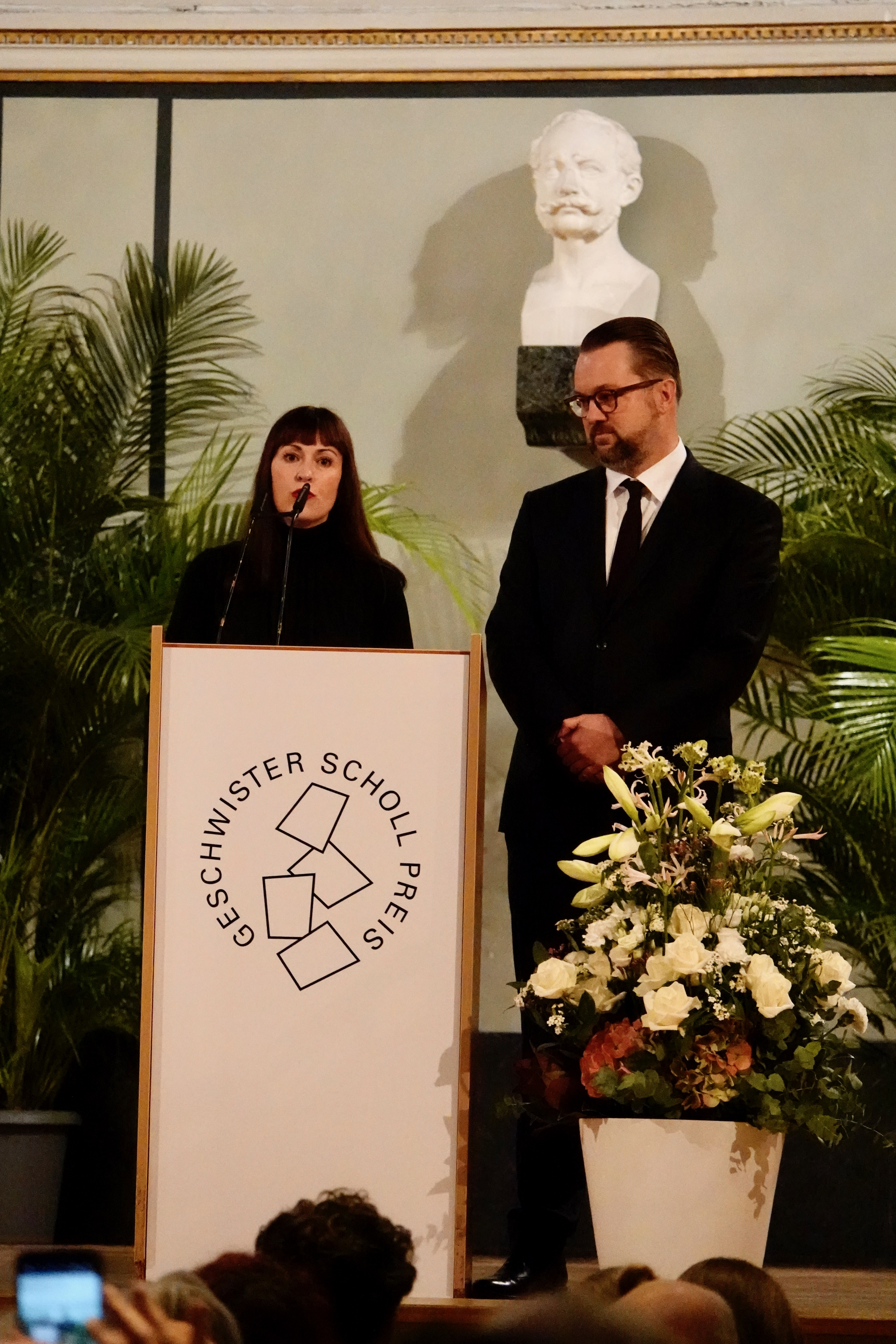
Geschwister-Scholl-Preis 2025

- 1980: Rolf Hochhuth: Eine Liebe in Deutschland
- 1981: Reiner Kunze: Auf eigene Hoffnung
- 1982: Franz Fühmann: Der Sturz des Engels
- 1983: Walter Dirks: War ich ein linker Spinner?
- 1984: Anna Rosmus: Widerstand und Verfolgung
- 1985: Jürgen Habermas: Die neue Unübersichtlichkeit
- 1986: Cordelia Edvardson: Gebranntes Kind sucht das Feuer
- 1987: Christa Wolf: Störfall
- 1988: Grete Weil: Der Brautpreis
- 1989: Helmuth James Graf von Moltke: Briefe an Freya 1939–1945 (posthumously)
- 1990: Lea Rosh/Eberhard Jäckel: Der Tod ist ein Meister aus Deutschland
- 1991: Georges-Arthur Goldschmidt: Die Absonderung
- 1992: Barbara Distel / Wolfgang Benz (Publ.): Dachau Booklet No. 7 Solidarität und Widerstand
- 1993: Wolfgang Sofsky: Die Ordnung des Terrors – Das Konzentrationslager
- 1994: Heribert Prantl: Deutschland leicht entflammbar – Ermittlungen gegen die Bonner Politik
- 1995: Victor Klemperer: Ich will Zeugnis ablegen bis zum letzten. Tagebücher 1933–1945 (posthumously)
- 1996: Hans Deichmann: Gegenstände
- 1997: Ernst Klee: Auschwitz, die NS-Medizin und ihre Opfer
- 1998: Saul Friedländer: Das Dritte Reich und die Juden
- 1999: Peter Gay: Meine deutsche Frage (first published as My German Question: Growing Up in Nazi Berlin, 1998, his autobiography)
- 2000: Helene Holzman: Dies Kind soll leben (posthumously)
- 2001: Arno Gruen: Der Fremde in uns
- 2002: Raul Hilberg: Die Quellen des Holocaust
- 2003: Mark Roseman: In einem unbewachten Augenblick. Eine Frau überlebt im Untergrund
- 2004: Soazig Aaron: Klaras NEIN
- 2005: Necla Kelek: Die fremde Braut
- 2006: Mihail Sebastian: Voller Entsetzen, aber nicht verzweifelt (posthumously)
- 2007: Anna Politkovskaya: Russisches Tagebuch (posthumously)
- 2008: David Grossman: Die Kraft zur Korrektur. Über Politik und Literatur
- 2009: Roberto Saviano: Das Gegenteil von Tod
- 2010: Joachim Gauck: Winter im Sommer – Frühling im Herbst: Erinnerungen.
- 2011: Liao Yiwu: Für ein Lied und hundert Lieder. Ein Zeugenbericht aus chinesischen Gefängnissen. (engl.: For a song and one hundred songs : a poet's journey through a Chinese prison.)
- 2012: Andreas Huckele v/o Jürgen Dehmers: Wie laut soll ich denn noch schreien? Die Odenwaldschule und der sexuelle Missbrauch.
- 2013: Otto Dov Kulka: Landschaften der Metropole des Todes. Auschwitz und die Grenzen der Erinnerung und der Vorstellungskraft. (engl.: Landscapes of the metropolis of death : reflections on memory and imagination.)
- 2014: Glenn Greenwald: No Place to Hide
- 2015: Achille Mbembe: Critique de la raison nègre
- 2016: Garance Le Caisne: Opération César
- 2017: Hisham Matar: The Return
- 2018: Götz Aly: Europa gegen die Juden. 1880–1945
- 2019: Ahmet Altan: Ich werde die Welt nie wiedersehen. Texte aus dem Gefängnis
- 2020: Dina Nayeri: Der undankbare Flüchtling
- 2022: Andrey Kurkov: Tagebuch einer Invasion
- 2023: David Van Reybrouck: Revolusi. Indonesien und die Entstehung der modernen Welt
- 2024: Katerina Gordeeva: Nimm meinen Schmerz. Geschichten aus dem Krieg
- 2025: Carolin Amlinger and Oliver Nachtwey: Zerstörungslust. Elemente des demokratischen Faschismus
