= Walter Delgatti Neto =

Brazilian hacker (born 1989)

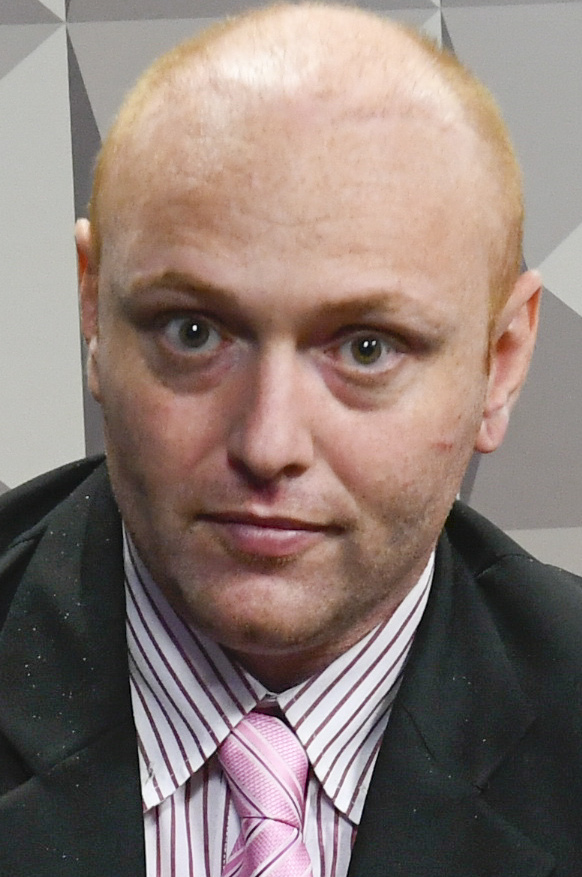
- Hearing of Delgatti in the 8 January CPMI
- Born: 23 March 1989 (age 37); Araraquara, São Paulo, Brazil
- Other names: Hacker de Araraquara; Vermelho
- Known for: Vaza Jato
- Political party: DEM (until 2019)
- Status: In prison
- Convictions: First: Mobile device hacking; Second: Fraudulent misrepresentation, computer device hacking
- Penalty: First: 20 years and 1 month; Second: 8 years and 3 months

Walter Delgatti Neto (Portuguese pronunciation: [ˈvaw.teʁ dew.ɡaˈt͡ʃi ˈnɛ.tu]; born 23 March 1989), also known as Hacker de Araraquara ([ˈʁa.keʁ d͡ʒi a.ɾa.ɾaˈkwa.ɾɐ]; lit. 'Araraquara Hacker') or Vermelho ([veʁˈme.ʎu]; lit. 'Red') is a Brazilian hacker. He became nationally known for hacking mobile devices of Operation Car Wash authorities, and later, for crimes committed along congresswoman Carla Zambelli. On 25 July 2019, he was expelled from Democrats (DEM) political party after being arrested. On 14 May 2025, the Supreme Federal Court unanimously convicted Delgatti to 8 years and 3 months of prison for hacking the systems of the National Council of Justice. Congresswoman Zambelli was also convicted for the same crime.

== Background ==
Before becoming nationally known for hacking Brazilian authorities, Delgatti Neto, known as Red for being redhead, already had criminal background. In 2013, he was convicted in second instance for embezzling R$600,000 from a bank, but wasn't arrested due to crime prescription. In 2015, he was convicted for scam. In 2018, he was indicted for drug trafficking and document fraud after the police found drugs, false medical prescriptions and a false student ID, but he was acquitted.

== Vaza Jato ==
In 2019, The Intercept Brasil published talks between Operation Car Wash authorities which showed supposed violations of impartiality, independence and equidistance between defense and prosecution. In the talks, judge Sergio Moro guided the prosecution, suggesting changes in phases of Operation Car Wash, along prosecutor Deltan Dallagnol and other members of the operation. Later, Delgatti confessed to the Federal Police for being the responsible for hacking the Moro and other authorities' mobile phones. The hacker later confirmed to the police for being responsible to leak the informations to The Intercept Brasil. Delgatti was described by the press as "the hacker who buried [Operation] Car Wash".

On 21 August 2021, Delgatti was convicted to 20 years in prison, after the investigations from Operation Spoofing. According to the ruling, the group leaded by Delgatti had negotiated the selling of stolen information for R$200,000 and that they gave up charging for the publishing after journalists refused to pay for anything. At the moment of the conviction, Delgatti was already arrested for violating the National Council of Justice systems.

== Envolvement with Carla Zambelli and Jair Bolsonaro ==
In a hearing to the Federal Police, Delgatti affirmed being hired by congresswoman Carla Zambelli to provide criminal services. According to him, Zambelli wished to hack justice Alexandre de Moraes mobile phone and the voting machines. According to the Federal Police, the congresswoman's advisor sent a R$13,500 Pix payment to Delgatti.

After failed attempts to compromise the Superior Electoral Court systems, Delgatti could hack the National Council of Justice (CNJ) system and issue an arrest warrant against Alexandre Moraes, signed by the justice himself.

During a parliamentary commission to investigate the Praça dos Três Poderes attack of 8 January 2023, Delgatti allegedly met with then-president Jair Bolsonaro on 10 August 2022, in the presence of Zambelli. Bolsonaro would have requested the hacker to compromise the electronic voting system to create untrust about the Brazilian elections. After Delgatti explained that it wouldn't be possible to violate this system, which is not connected to the internet, Bolsonaro would have requested to tamper a voting machine to seem that, at the eve of the elections, the equipment had been compromised. Bolsonaro allies tried to discredit Delgatti and his claims.

Besides that, Delgatti stated that he had talked to Bolsonaro one more time, by phone. In this call, Bolsonaro would have said that Moraes' mobile phone had been wiretapped and requested that, if the wiretapping came to public, Delgatti should assume all responsibility, in exchange for a presidential pardon. Bolsonaro's defense denied all of the claims.

On 29 February 2024, the Federal Police concluded the inquiry and indicted Zambelli and Delgatti for the invasion of the Nacional Council of Justice system.

On 23 April 2024, Prosecutor General Paulo Gonet filed a complaint against Zambelli and Delgatti for hacking the CNJ system. Zambelli was denounced as the head of the crime. On 21 May 2024, Zambelli and Degatti became defendants by the Supreme Court 1st Group.

In July 2024, judge Omar Dantes Lima, of the 3rd Criminal Circuit of Brasília, convicted Delgatti Neto for defamation against former president Jair Bolsonaro.

In May 2025, Delgatti was sentenced to 8 years and 3 months of prison for the CNJ hacking, with sentence confirmed in June 2025.
