= Bruno Zambelli =

Brazilian politician (born 1978)

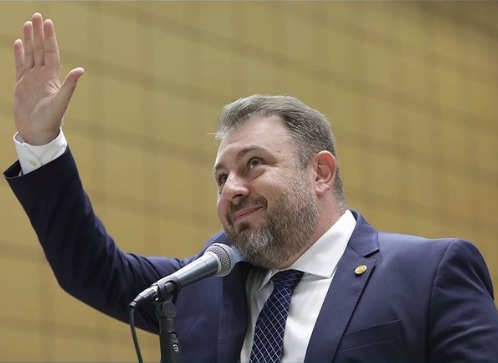
- Zambelli in 2023

Member of the Legislative Assembly of São Paulo
- Incumbent
- Assumed office 15 March 2023

Personal details
- Born: 24 August 1978 (age 48) São Paulo
- Party: Liberal Party (since 2022)
- Relatives: Carla Zambelli (sister)

Bruno Zambelli Salgado (born 24 August 1978) is a Brazilian politician serving as a member of the Legislative Assembly of São Paulo since 2023. He is the brother of Carla Zambelli.

He was reelected state deputy in the 2026 state elections with 82.946 votes

== Electoral results ==
Year	Election	Position	Party	Votes	%	Result	Ref.
2020	Municipal Election São Paulo	City Council	PRTB	12.302		No	
2022	State of São Paulo	State Deputy	PL	235.305	1,01%	Yes	
2026	State of São Paulo	State Deputy	PL	82.946	0,36%	Yes	
