= No Place to Hide (Greenwald book) =

Book by Glenn Greenwald

- Author: Glenn Greenwald
- Language: English
- Subject: Global surveillance disclosures, Edward Snowden
- Genre: Non-fiction
- Published: 2014, Metropolitan Books
- Publication place: United States
- Media type: Print, e-book
- Pages: 272 pages
- ISBN: 978-1627790734

No Place to Hide: Edward Snowden, the NSA, and the U.S. Surveillance State is a 2014 non-fiction book by American investigative journalist Glenn Greenwald. It was first published on May 13, 2014 through Metropolitan Books and details Greenwald's role in the Snowden disclosures.

== Synopsis ==
The book consists of five chapters; Contact, Ten Days in Hong Kong, Collect It All, The Harm of Surveillance, and the Fourth Estate, plus an introduction and an epilogue. In the introduction Greenwald explains how his background as a blogger on surveillance practices of the American government attracted Edward Snowden's attention, and he summarizes the nature, legality, and evolution of such practices. Greenwald concludes by discussing how a global surveillance network has been created with the assistance of technology companies and the unique role of the internet in human history as a facilitator of such surveillance.

In the body of the book, Greenwald discusses how he became involved with the 2013 global surveillance disclosures. He began by traveling to Hong Kong to meet Edward Snowden, who had contacted Greenwald as an anonymous source purporting to have evidence of government surveillance. As Greenwald continued to investigate he uncovered more information that he later published, to much controversy. In the book Greenwald also discusses establishment media, which he states will traditionally avoid publishing anything that would put them at odds with the government and as such, are less helpful when it comes to the interests of the general public.

== Reception ==
In his review for The Washington Post, law professor David Cole called No Place to Hide an important and illuminating book but wrote, "It would have been more important and illuminating were Greenwald able to acknowledge that the choices we face about regulating surveillance in the modern age are difficult and that there are no simple answers." Slate gave a mostly positive review, stating that while the book "doesn’t offer an in-depth portrait of the leaker" it does serve as a good "primer" on "what was at stake when he downloaded the government’s most precious secrets onto a thumb drive".

The book was positively reviewed by Henry Porter in the London Observer. Porter said that he found "reacquainting myself with the details of surveillance and intrusion by America's NSA and Britain's GCHQ was simply shocking. As the stories rolled out last year, there was almost too much to absorb...Greenwald's book is a tough read if you find these things disturbing." Porter said that reading No Place to Hide he had wondered "...how we let the spies probe our lives with such inadequate controls, and how on earth we fell for the propaganda that this massive apparatus was there to protect, not control, us." Critically Porter felt that the book lacked "...a chart or timeline of the major revelations as well as a proper index. And I did feel the argument lost momentum in the middle..." concluding that "...on the whole this is a vigorously executed and important book." Porter reserved criticism for what he felt was a lack of appreciation by Greenwald of the importance of the efforts of Ewen MacAskill and his fellow Guardian writers in bringing the disclosures to publication.

Glenn Greenwald received the 2014 Geschwister-Scholl-Preis, an annual German literary award, for the German edition of No Place to Hide.

== Bibliography ==
- Greenwald, Glenn (2014). No Place to Hide: Edward Snowden, the NSA, and the U.S. Surveillance State (first ed.). London: Hamish Hamilton. ISBN 978-0-241146-699.
