= Working Assets =

American corporation

Working Assets is a corporation in the United States founded in 1985 by Peter Barnes.

Working Assets' first product was the Better World Credit Card. After the United States deregulated telephone service, the company introduced Working Assets Long Distance in 1991. A unionization effort in 1995 was strongly resisted by the management of Working Assets. Soon after the union contract went through, the call center group was sold to Michael Ansara's Share Group. In 2001, Share opened a call center in Canada and all San Francisco based union members were laid off. In 2000, it also became a mobile virtual network operator, operating as Working Assets Wireless. The company renamed this division to CREDO Mobile in November 2007. In May 2006, Working Assets Publishing launched with the release of Glenn Greenwald's book, How Would a Patriot Act?

According to its website, Working Assets has raised more than $83 million for progressive nonprofit organizations since its inception, such as news site Democracy Now! as well as others such as Greenpeace and Planned Parenthood. It has also partnered with other organizations on projects such as Leave My Child Alone, with Mainstreet Moms and Acorn.

October 2016, Ray Morris became Credo's CEO. The company stopped collecting donations from individual Credo customers and instead, made periodic corporate donations to liberal causes. January 2020, Credo ended all direct activism campaigns.

Credo Mobile was purchased by B. Riley Principal Investments September 2021. Five months later, the Working Assets credit card division was evidently sold to Bank of America. Working Assets credit card holders were not notified but, as of May 2022, make payments directly to Bank of America. Credo provides no information or customer service for Working Assets credit card holders. (Call center agents are available for Credo Mobile customers.)

In a notice dated April 12, 2023, Bank of America notified the Working Assets cardholders that their card would now become "Bank of America Customized Cash Rewards" credit card.
