= Ernst Klee =

German journalist & author (1942–2013)

- Cover of "The Good Old Days": The Holocaust Through the Eyes of the Perpetrators and Bystanders by Ernst Klee (1991) et alii
- Born: 15 March 1942; Frankfurt am Main
- Died: 18 May 2013 (aged 71); Frankfurt am Main
- Occupations: Historian, author
- Writing career
- Genre: World War II
- Notable works: "The Good Old Days": The Holocaust Through the Eyes of the Perpetrators and Bystanders

Ernst Klee (15 March 1942 in Frankfurt – 18 May 2013 in Frankfurt) was a German journalist and author. As a writer on Germany's history, he was best known for his exposure and documentation of medical crimes in Nazi Germany, much of which was concerned with the Action T4 or involuntary euthanasia program. He is the author of "The Good Old Days": The Holocaust Through the Eyes of the Perpetrators and Bystanders first published in English translation in 1991.

== Life and work ==
Klee was first trained as a sanitary and heating technician. Afterwards, he caught up on his university entrance requirements and then studied theology and social education.

As a journalist in the 1970s, he looked at socially excluded groups, such as the homeless, psychiatric patients and the disabled. During this period, he collaborated with Gusti Steiner, who laid the foundation for the federal German emancipatory movement of disabled people at that time.

In 1997, he received the Geschwister-Scholl-Preis ("Scholl Siblings Prize") for his book, Auschwitz, die NS-Medizin und ihre Opfer (Auschwitz, Nazi Medicine and Their Victims). In 2001, the city of Frankfurt am Main honored Klee with the Goethe Plaque of the City of Frankfurt for his book, Deutsche Medizin im Dritten Reich. Karrieren vor und nach 1945 (German Medicine in the Third Reich. Careers before and after 1945). The explanation states that Klee's works "are suitable to support civil freedom, moral and intellectual courage, and to give important impetus to current awareness." Klee's commitment to the importance of disabled people was the decisive factor in the former Westfälische Schule für Körperbehinderte (Westphalian School for the Physically Disabled) in Mettingen being renamed the Ernst-Klee-Schule in his honor in 2005.

Klee wrote for the weekly newspaper, Die Zeit. There were 27 articles by him between 1974 and 1995. In 2003, he wrote an article criticizing the omission of Nazi activity in the career details of those mentioned in the Deutsche Biographische Enzyklopädie ("German Biographical Encyclopedia") or his description of the relationship of German artists to the Nazi extermination camps in German-occupied Poland. Contemporary author Karl-Heinz Janßen wrote on 27 February 1987 about Klee, "Contemporary historical research ignores this subject [of medical crimes during the Nazi period]; [...] if it were not for the free-lance journalist, Ernst Klee, who went to the effort of reading thousands of case files and rummaging through archives of institutions, almost nothing would be known today about one of the most horrible atrocities of this century."

Klee died in his hometown of Frankfurt am Main at the age of 71 after a long and severe illness.

== Bibliography ==
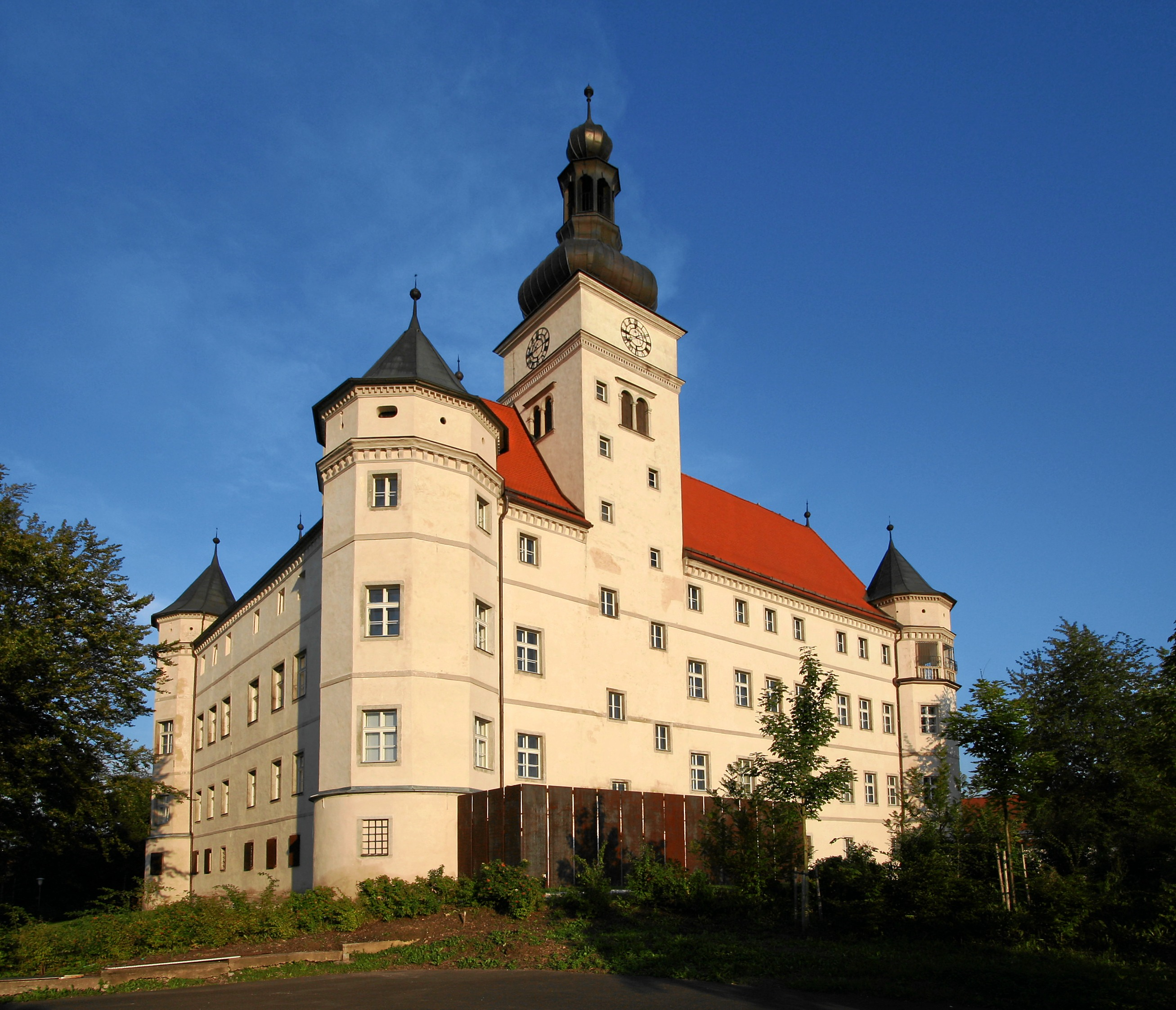
Action T4 programme participant called Hartheim Euthanasia Centre, the focus of Klee's World War II research (ISBN 3-596-24327-0), 2005 photo

Translations:

- Ernst Klee, Willi Dressen and Volker Riess (editors), "The Good Old Days": The Holocaust Through the Eyes of the Perpetrators and Bystanders, London, Hamish Hamilton, 1991; published in the USA under the title "The Good Old Days": The Holocaust as Seen by Its Perpetrators and Bystanders, Old Saybrook, CT, Konecky and Konecky, 1991 ISBN 1-56852-133-2 (original German edition S. Fischer, 1988).

Selected works in German:

- Auschwitz. Täter, Gehilfen, Opfer und was aus ihnen wurde. Ein Personenlexikon. S. Fischer, Frankfurt am Main 2013, ISBN 978-3-10-039333-3, eBook ISBN 978-3-10-402813-2.
- Das Kulturlexikon zum Dritten Reich. Wer war was vor und nach 1945 ("The Cultural Excyclopedia of the Third Reich. Who was What before and after 1945"). Frankfurt am Main: S. Fischer, 2007, 720 pages, hardcover, ISBN 978-3-10-039326-5 (with over 4,000 entries), reviews by Esteban Engel [in:] Frankfurter Neue Presse and by Fritz J. Raddatz in Die Zeit, 1 March 2007, No. 10, p. 54: Alphabet der Schändlichkeit (Alphabet of Shamefulness).
- Das Personenlexikon zum Dritten Reich. Wer war was vor und nach 1945? ("The Encyclopedia of People in the Third Reich. Who was What before and after 1945?") Frankfurt am Main: S. Fischer, 2003; 2nd edition. 2005, 732 pages, ISBN 3-596-16048-0. 4,300 short biographies. (Review, Die Zeit, 23 October 2003)
- Deutsche Medizin im Dritten Reich: Karrieren vor und nach 1945 ("German Medicine in the Third Reich: Careers before and after 1945"). Frankfurt am Main: S. Fischer, 2001. ISBN 3-10-039310-4 Review, Die Zeit, No. 44, 2001
- Auschwitz, die NS-Medizin und ihre Opfer (Auschwitz, Nazi Medicine and Its Victims). Frankfurt am Main: S. Fischer, 1997. Paperback, 2001, ISBN 978-3-596-14906-3
- Eine feine Gesellschaft: soziale Wirklichkeit Deutschland ("A Fine Society: Social Reality Germany"). Düsseldorf: Patmos-Verlag, 1995
- "Euthanasie" im Nationalsozialismus ("'Euthanasia' in National Socialism") / [Booklet editors: Michael Gehler; Heidemarie Uhl]. Vienna: J & V, Ed. Vienna, Dachs-Verlag, 1994
- Persilscheine und falsche Pässe: wie die Kirchen den Nazis halfen ("Whitewash Certificates and False Passports: How the Churches Helped the Nazis"). Frankfurt am Main: Fischer-Taschenbuch-Verlag, 1991
- "Durch Zyankali erlöst": Sterbehilfe und Euthanasie heute ("'Saved by Potassium Cyanide': Euthaniasia Today"). Frankfurt am Main: Fischer-Taschenbuch-Verlag, 1990
- "Die SA Jesu Christi": die Kirchen im Banne Hitlers ("'The Storm Troupers of Jesus Christ': The Churches under the Spell of Hitler"). Frankfurt am Main: Fischer-Taschenbuch-Verlag, 1989
- "Gott mit uns": der deutsche Vernichtungskrieg im Osten 1939–1945 ("'God with Us': The German War of Extermination in the East 1939–1945") / Ernst Klee; Willi Dressen. In collaboration with Volker Riess. Frankfurt am Main: S. Fischer, 1989
- "Schöne Zeiten": Judenmord aus der Sicht der Täter und Gaffer ("'The Good Old Times': The Murder of the Jews as Seen by the Perpetrators and Onlookers"). Frankfurt am Main: S. Fischer, 1988. 276 pages. ISBN 3-10-039304-X
- Querschnittgelähmt – kein Leben vor dem Tod? Hilfen für eine positive Antwort. Mit einer Anzeige von Claudio Kürten ("Paraplegic – No Life before Death? Help for a Positive Answer. With information by Claudio Kürten"). Publ. by Heinrich Kratzmeier. Heidelberg: Verlag für Medizin Fischer, 1987
- Was sie taten – was sie wurden: Ärzte, Juristen und andere Beteiligte am Kranken- oder Judenmord ("What They Did – What They Became: Doctors, Jurists and Other Participants in the Murder of the Ill or Jews"). Frankfurt am Main: Fischer-Taschenbuch-Verlag, 12th edition, 2004 ISBN 3-596-24364-5
- Dokumente zur "Euthanasie" ("Documents on 'Euthaniasia'") / publ. by Ernst Klee. Frankfurt am Main: Fischer-Taschenbuch-Verlag, 1985, 4th edition. 1997. 342 pages. ISBN 3-596-24327-0
- "Euthanasie" im NS-Staat: die "Vernichtung lebensunwerten Lebens" ("'Euthanasia' in the Nazi State: The 'Extermination of Life Not Worth Living'"). Frankfurt am Main, S. Fischer. 1983; 11th edition, 1985. ISBN 3-596-24326-2
- Behindert: über die Enteignung von Körper und Bewusstsein; ein kritisches Handbuch ("Disabled: About the Expropriation of Body and Consciousness; A Critical Handbook"). Frankfurt am Main: S. Fischer, 1980. Paperback, 1987
- Behinderte im Urlaub? Das Frankfurter Urteil; eine Dokumentation ("Disabled on Holiday? The Frankfurt Decision; A Record"). Frankfurt am Main: Fischer-Taschenbuch-Verlag, 1980
- Gottesmänner und ihre Frauen: Geschichten aus dem Pfarrhaus ("Men of God and their Wives: Stories from the Parsonage"). Frankfurt am Main: Fischer-Taschenbuch-Verlag, 1980
- Pennbrüder und Stadtstreicher: Nichtsesshaften-Report ("Tramps and Vagrants: Report on Persons of No Fixed Abode"). Frankfurt am Main: Fischer-Taschenbuch-Verlag, 1979
- Psychiatrie-Report ("Psychiatry Report"). Frankfurt am Main: Fischer-Taschenbuch-Verlag, 1978
- Sozialprotokolle: wie wir leben, wie wir sterben; Lehrstücke zum Umgang mit Menschen ("Social Records: How We Live, How We Die; Lessons on Dealings with People"). Düsseldorf: Patmos-Verlag, 1978
- Gefahrenzone Betrieb: Verschleiß und Erkrankung am Arbeitsplatz ("Factory Danger Zone: Deterioration and Illness in the Workplace"). Frankfurt am Main: Fischer-Taschenbuch-Verlag, 1977
- Der Schrotthaufen der Menschlichkeit: ein Lesebuch zur sozialen Wirklichkeit in der Bundesrepublik Deutschland; Reports und Reportagen ("The Scrap Pile of Humanity: A Reader on Social Reality in the Federal Republic of Germany: Reports"). Düsseldorf: Patmos-Verlag, 1976
- Miteinander leben: Behinderte unter uns (Living With Each Other: Disabled Among Us) / Text: Ernst Klee. Publ.: Evang. Acad. Bad Boll. Bad Boll, Evang. Akademie, 1976
- Behinderten-Report (Disabled Report). Frankfurt am Main: Fischer-Taschenbuch-Verlag, 1974
- Behindertsein ist schön: Unterlagen zur Arbeit mit Behinderten (Being Disabled is Beautiful: Documents for Work with Disabled People). Düsseldorf: Patmos-Verlag, 1974
- Der Zappler: der körperbehinderte Jürgen erobert seine Umwelt; ein grosses wagemutiges Abenteuer ("The Fidgeter: The Physically Handicapped Jürgen Conquers His Environment; A Great, Daring Adventure"). Illustrated by Bettina Anrich-Wölfel. Düsseldorf: Schwann, 1974
- Gastarbeiter-Reportagen ("Foreign Worker Reports"). Translation of the Greek texts by Homeros Anagnostidis. Stein, Nuremberg: Laetare-Verlag, 1973
- Randgruppenpädagogik: Grundlagen zum Umgang mit Randgruppen, Aussenseitern und Gestörten ("Fringe Group Education: Foundations for Dealing with Fringe Groups, Outsiders and Troubled Persons"). Mainz, Matthias-Grünewald-Verlag, 1973
- Knast-Reportagen ("Jail Reports"). Stein (Nuremberg): Laetare-Verlag, 1973
- Resozialisierung: ein Handbuch zur Arbeit mit Strafgefangenen und Entlassenen ("Resocialization: A Handbook for Work with Prisoners and Those Released"). Claudius-Verlag, Munich 1973
- Die armen Irren: das Schicksal der seelisch Kranken ("The Poor Lunatics: The Fate of the Mentally Ill"). Patmos-Verlag, Düsseldorf 1972
- Fips schafft sie alle ("Little Fellow Causes It All"). Illustrated by Bettina Anrich-Wölfel. Schwann, Düsseldorf 1972
- Gastarbeiter: Analysen und Berichte ("Foreign Worker: Analyses and Reports") / publ. by Ernst Klee. Suhrkamp, Frankfurt (am Main) 1972
- Die im Dunkeln: Sozialreportagen ("Those in the Dark: Social Reports"). Patmos-Verlag, Düsseldorf 1971
- Die Nigger Europas: Zur Lage der Gastarbeiter. Eine Dokumentation ("The Niggers of Europe: On the Situation of the Foreign Workers. A Report"). Patmos-Verlag, Düsseldorf 1971
- Prügelknaben der Gesellschaft: Häftlingsberichte ("Whipping Boys of Society: Prisoner Reports"). Patmos-Verlag, Düsseldorf 1971
- Thema Knast ("Subject: Jail"). Stelten, Bremen 1969
- Wege und Holzwege: Evang. Dichtung des 20. Jahrhunderts ("Paths and Wrong Tracks: Protestant Literature of the 20th Century"). Bremen 1969

== Documentary ==
- Die Hölle von Ückermünde. Psychiatrie im Osten. (The Hell of Ückermünde. Psychiatry in the East) Report, 43 min., Book and direction: Ernst Klee, Production: ARD, First broadcast: 1993
  This report was broadcast by ARD in 1993. The development of psychiatry in "the third year after the German reunification", shown in the examples of two institutions in the former East Germany. The film shows shocking treatment of disabled people. The commentary uses the view of those affected. Fifty years after the "euthanasia" in Germany, this documentation reminds the viewer of it again. Within the setting of criticism of psychiatry, Klee's documentation occupies equal importance with the feature films, Freaks, Shock Corridor and One Flew Over the Cuckoo's Nest.

== Selected awards ==
- 1971: Kurt-Magnus-Preis established by the ARD
- 1981: Television prize of the Deutsche Akademie der Darstellenden Künste
- 1982: Adolf-Grimme-Preis
- 1997: Geschwister-Scholl-Preis
- 2001: Goethe Plaque of the City of Frankfurt
- 2007: Wilhelm-Leuschner-Medaille
