= Helene Holzman =

German painter and author

Helene Holzman (30 August 1891 in Jena – 25 August 1968) was a German painter and writer. She spent time in a concentration camp. She posthumously won the Geschwister-Scholl-Preis for the memoir Dies Kind Soll Leben (This Child Must Live).
