= Colégio Militar de Brasília =

Brasília Military School

Location
- SGAN 905, Conjunto A, Asa Norte; Brasília, Federal District 70790-050; Brazil
- Coordinates: 15°46′51.89″S 47°53′34.39″W

Information
- School type: Public military school
- Founded: 1 September 1978; 47 years ago
- School district: Brazilian Army - Directorate of Preparatory and Assistance Education (DEPA)
- Teaching staff: ~150
- Grades: 6–12
- Gender: Coeducational
- Enrollment: ~3,100 (2023)
- Campus type: Urban
- Colors: Green and yellow
- Communities served: Brasília metropolitan area
- Feeder schools: Public and private schools in the Federal District
- Website: www.cmb.eb.mil.br

The Brasília Military School (Portuguese: Colégio Militar de Brasília, abbreviated CMB) is a public military school located in Brasília, Federal District, Brazil. Established on 1 September 1978, it is part of the Brazilian Military Schools System (Sistema Colégio Militar do Brasil, SCMB), under the Directorate of Preparatory and Assistance Education (DEPA) of the Brazilian Army. Serving approximately 3,100 students in grades 6 to 12 (equivalent to Brazil's Ensino Fundamental II and Ensino Médio), the CMB is renowned for its academic excellence, strict discipline, and civic education. With a sprawling campus of 240,000 square meters, it ranks among Brazil's largest educational institutions by area.

== History ==
=== Founding ===
The CMB's construction was enabled by a 31 March 1976 agreement between the Brazilian Army's General Department of Engineering and Communications and the Federal District government, with the campus designed by architect Hélio Ferreira Pinto. On 19 December 1977, DEPA approved its operation, and classes began on 5 March 1979 with 720 students in grades 5 to 8, initially operating as a day school. The school was formally established by Decree No. 81,248, signed by President Ernesto Geisel on 23 January 1978, with its official installation on 1 September 1978 under Colonel Adriano Aúlio Pinheiro da Silva. The high school program (grades 10–12) was fully implemented by 1982.

=== Development ===
In 2001, the CMB received the Order of Military Merit from President Fernando Henrique Cardoso for its educational achievements. It has since become a benchmark in the Federal District, excelling in national assessments, scientific olympiads, and international competitions. In 2024, the school celebrated its 45th anniversary, reaffirming its commitment to holistic education.

== Structure ==
=== Facilities ===
The CMB spans 240,000 m², with 60,000 m² of built area, including 100 classrooms, science, computer, and language labs, a 20,000-volume library, and a 500-seat auditorium. Its sports facilities feature a football field, a multi-purpose gymnasium, nine courts (volleyball, basketball, handball, tennis, futsal), an Olympic-sized pool, a weight room, and spaces for judo, fencing, and Krav Maga. Cultural amenities include music rooms, a theater, and a film projection space.

=== Academic Organization ===
With around 3,100 students, 150 teachers (military and civilian), and 200 support staff, the CMB operates in morning and afternoon shifts, with classes capped at 30 students. Its governance blends military hierarchy with democratic engagement, fostering dialogue with parents and students. Teachers undergo training, such as the PARFOR program, particularly in History and Moral and Civic Education.

== Curriculum ==
The CMB follows the SCMB curriculum, aligned with Brazil's National Common Core Curriculum (BNCC), including Mathematics, Portuguese, Sciences, History, and Geography, supplemented by Moral and Civic Education (EMC) and military drills. EMC emphasizes ethical, patriotic, and citizenship values. Strict discipline, enforced through uniforms and conduct rules, supports a focused learning environment.

Since 2015, assessments prioritize cognitive and socioemotional skills, enhancing academic outcomes. Innovations like film-based critical thinking and interdisciplinary projects in robotics and science prepare students for modern challenges.

== Admissions ==
Admission is through an annual competitive exam, offering around 25 spots for grade 6 and 5 for grade 10, testing Mathematics and Portuguese (minimum 50% per subject), followed by medical and dental evaluations. Dependents of military personnel may access reserved spots via lottery or legal provisions. The process attracts thousands, reflecting the school’s prestige.

== Academic Performance ==
The CMB excels nationally, achieving an IDEB score of 6.8 in grade 9 (2019), surpassing the Federal District (5.4) and national (4.9) averages. In 2023, it remained among Brazil’s top public schools. Its National High School Exam (ENEM) scores exceed 600, with strong approval rates in exams like PAS/UnB, IME, and AMAN. Students win awards in national olympiads and international contests, such as the 2024 UNESCO-Reis competition against 255 global schools.

== Extracurricular Activities ==
The CMB offers free sports (football, volleyball, judo, fencing, swimming, Krav Maga), robotics clubs, scouting, music, theater, and UN simulations. Physical Education, including Krav Maga (popular with 30% of students), promotes discipline and health. Events like Eureka Day and science fairs highlight student research.

== Social Impact ==
The CMB engages the community through cultural fairs and charity initiatives, fostering citizenship. Its merit-based admission benefits diverse backgrounds, though selectivity limits access. Alumni excel in civilian (medicine, engineering, law) and military careers.

== Gallery ==
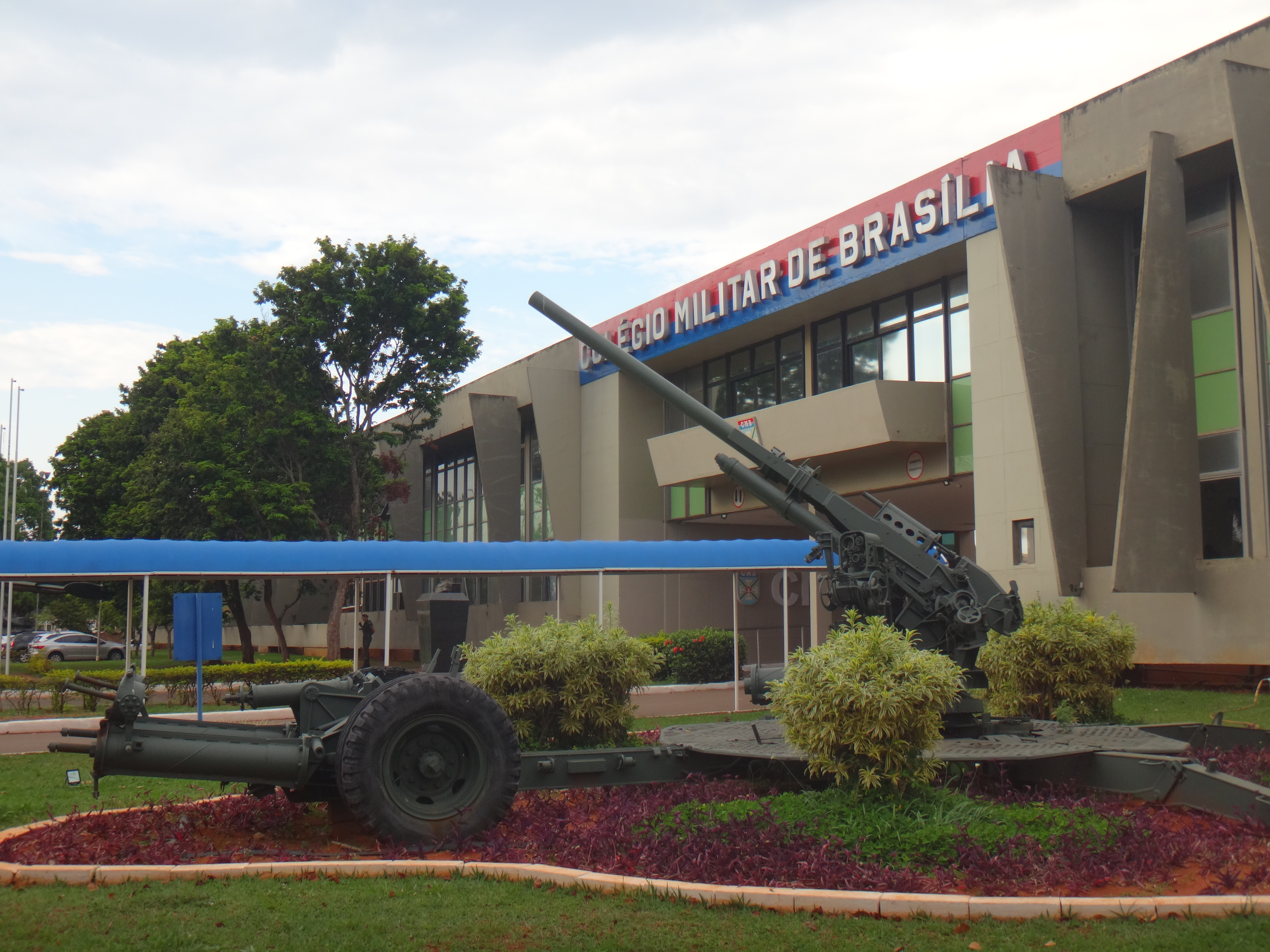
West Gate of Brasília Military School
