= How Would a Patriot Act? =

- Author: Glenn Greenwald
- Language: English
- Publisher: Working Assets Publishing
- Publication date: 2006
- Pages: 128
- ISBN: 978-0-9779440-0-2

How Would a Patriot Act? Defending American Values from a President Run Amok is a New York Times best selling book by the constitutional lawyer and journalist Glenn Greenwald published in May 2006. Greenwald attacks what he argues is the illegal activity of the Bush administration in warrantless wiretapping and other matters, providing citations from Supreme Court decisions, Congressional statements, and writings by the Founding Fathers of the United States.

It is the first book published by Working Assets.
