= Vaza Jato =

2019 Brazilian political scandal

Vaza Jato (Brazilian Portuguese: [ˈvazɐ ˈʒatu]; roughly meaning Car Wash Leaks; a word play with "Operation Car Wash" and "Leaks" – i.e. Lava Jato and Vaza) is the term used by the Brazilian press for leaked conversations in the Telegram app about the actions, decisions and positions of officials conducting investigations for Operation Car Wash (Operação Lava Jato). These officials include former judge Sergio Moro and prosecutor Deltan Dallagnol. The conversations were reported by the journalist Glenn Greenwald of The Intercept Brasil and by Brazilian conservative magazine Veja in June 2019.

The transcripts of the private chats would indicate that Moro provided insider information to prosecutors, assisting the Federal Prosecutor's Office (MPF) in building cases, as well as directing the prosecution, requesting operations against relatives of witnesses, suggesting modification in the phases of the Lava Jato operation. They also showed agility in new operations, strategic advice, providing informal clues, and resource suggestions to the MPF to convict the former Brazilian President Luiz Inácio Lula da Silva on corruption charges.

The leaks had wide repercussions. Sergio Moro, the Car Wash task force and the MPF, to defend themselves against the accusations, questioned the authenticity and origin of the data.

== Chronology ==
On June 9, 2019, The Intercept Brasil published three articles showing internal discussions, coordinated by prosecutor Dallagnol, in collaboration with former judge Moro. The three articles were summarized in two articles into English: Part 1 and Part 2. The exchanges were highly controversial, politicized and legally dubious attitudes of the Car Wash task force. The Intercept, in this phase, explains how and why they are publishing private chats about Car Wash and Sergio Moro. The reporters also show that the Car Wash prosecutors secretly plotted to prevent Lula from being interviewed before the elections for fear that he would help ‘elect Haddad’ and, additionally, that Dallagnol doubted the evidence against Lula and Petrobras' bribery hours before the denunciation of the triplex.

In Part 4, the conversation shows that the judge, not the prosecutors, was in charge of the investigation. He suggested that investigators change the order of phases of the Car Wash, called for agility in new operations, gave strategic advice and informal clues, anticipated a decision he would rectify, criticized and suggested appeals to the Public Prosecutor's Office and scolded Dallagnol.

Investigative reports surfaced in the midst of a deep political, economic and social crisis that Brazil is going through. For years, various sectors of society have denounced deviations, abuses and unconstitutional actions committed by the Car Wash operation. The following day, conservative newspaper O Globo and other media attacked the veracity of some facts in the article.

On June 12, 2019, Greenwald published the entire reserved dialogues, from October 2015 to September 2017, relevant to the report published on June 9 (Part 5). Telegram messages leaked between Moro and Dallagnol, now included Luiz Fux, Minister of Justice of the Supreme Federal Court. The messages show evidence of pressure from Moro, current Justice Minister of Jair Bolsonaro, to speed up the ruling despite the lack of evidence. Moro stated, in order to calm down the prosecutors about an appeal: "In Fux we trust".

Due to the political-party bias implicit in the dissemination of messages, on June 14, 2019, left-wing parties asked for the resignation of the Minister of Justice. Moro responded that he will not step down from his post and that he was the target of a cyber attack and that the country is facing "a crime in progress", promoted by a large professional criminal organization. On the same day, a Congressman from Bolsonaro's party explicitly was threatening Greenwald with arrest and/or deportation for reporting on the "massive improprieties of Bolsonaro's Justice Minister and the prosecutors who imprisoned Lula". Reacting to the Vaza Jato exposé, Rep. Ro Khanna and Sen. Bernie Sanders joined the Free Lula Movement and each raised concerns over Lula's continued imprisonment and the Bolsonaro government's involvement in the scandal.

On June 12, 2019, Brazilian conservative magazine Veja published a report accusing Moro of “illegally” steering prosecutors as they worked to convict Brazilian politicians and "overstepping his role as judge", claiming that its journalists had spent a fortnight pouring over nearly 650,000 leaked messages between officials involved in the investigation, and concluded the former judge was guilty of serious “irregularities”. Following the report, Moro released a statement condemning “the distorted and sensationalist diffusion of supposed messages obtained by criminal means”.

The Intercept and the Associated Press reported that the FBI requested case documents about Lula's investigation before the case became public, and Moro authorized the information to be sent to the Justice Department through unofficial channels. On August 20, 2019, US representative Hank Johnson (D–GA) and his colleagues sent a letter to then Attorney General William Barr stating that The Intercept published leaked communications between Judge Moro and senior prosecutors that "reveal close collaboration" and "reports of collusive actions aimed at building a case against former president Lula”. Rep. Johnson requested the DOJ to inform if the "DOJ agents aware of collusive actions involving Judge Moro …".

The Brazilian Congress identified at least 13 FBI agents involved with Moro and Dallagnol to collect secret court files. In exchange for these files and other information, that would help the prosecution of Brazilian companies under the U.S. Foreign Corrupt Practices Act (FCPA), U.S. authorities would share part of the fines to Moro and the Brazilian prosecutorial authorities involved with the Lava Jato operation, in order to create a private foundation totally administered and controlled by the same Brazilian prosecutors.

In July, 2020, 77 members of Congress sent a letter to their U.S. counterparts, requesting that the Americans “adopt the appropriate legislative measures” and “hold those responsible agents and officials accountable”. In July 2021, Congressman Hank Johnson requested from Attorney General, Merrick Garland to inform the Congress what was the role of the DOJ agents in the Car Wash operation and what role DOJ played in the political persecution of Lula da Silva. Congressman Johnson also additionally, informed the Attorney General that Rep. Johnson had never received an adequate response from the Barr DOJ about the issue his letter sent in August 2019.

== See also ==
- List of scandals in Brazil
