= American Cinema Editors Awards 2025 =

75th ACE Eddie Awards
- Presented by: American Cinema Editors
- Date: March 14, 2025
- Site: Royce Hall, Los Angeles, California

Highlights
- Best Film: Drama: Emilia Pérez
- Best Film: Comedy: Wicked

The 75th American Cinema Editors Eddie Awards were presented on March 14, 2025, at the Royce Hall in Los Angeles, honoring the best editors in film and television of 2024. The nominees were announced on December 11, 2024. To be eligible, films must have been released in theaters between January 1 to December 31, 2024, while television series must have aired between January 1 to November 1 of the same year.

Filmmaker Jon M. Chu received the ACE Golden Eddie Filmmaker of the Year Award for his "distinguished achievement in the art and business of film", while film editors Paul Hirsch and Maysie Hoy received career achievement honors.

The ceremony was originally scheduled for January 18, 2025, but was postponed due to the Southern California wildfires.

== Winners and nominees ==
=== Film ===
Best Edited Feature Film (Drama, Theatrical)	Best Edited Feature Film (Comedy, Theatrical)
Emilia Pérez – Juliette Welfling; Civil War – Jake Roberts; Conclave – Nick Emerson; Dune: Part Two – Joe Walker; Furiosa: A Mad Max Saga – Eliot Knapman and Margaret Sixel	Wicked – Myron Kerstein; Anora – Sean Baker; Challengers – Marco Costa; A Real Pain – Robert Nassau; The Substance – Coralie Fargeat, Jérôme Eltabet, and Valentin Féron
Best Edited Documentary Feature (Theatrical)	Best Edited Animated Feature Film (Theatrical or Non-Theatrical)
Will & Harper – Monique Zavistovski; Beatles '64 – Mariah Rehmet; Her Name Was Moviola – Howard Berry; Jim Henson: Idea Man – Paul Crowder and Sierra Neal; Super/Man: The Christopher Reeve Story – Otto Burnham	The Wild Robot – Mary Blee; Flow – Gints Zilbalodis; Inside Out 2 – Maurissa Horwitz; Moana 2 – Michael Louis Hill and Jeremy Milton; Wallace & Gromit: Vengeance Most Fowl – Dan Hembery
Best Edited Feature Film (Non-Theatrical)
Road House – Doc Crotzer (Prime Video); Am I OK? – Kayla M. Emter and Glen Scantlebury (Max); Unfrosted – Evan Henke (Netflix)

=== Television ===
Best Edited Drama Series	Best Edited Single-Camera Comedy Series
Shōgun: "A Dream of a Dream" – Maria Gonzales and Aika Miyake (FX / Hulu); 3 Body Problem: "Judgment Day" – Michael Ruscio (Netflix); Fallout: "The End" – Ali Comperchio (Prime Video); Mr. & Mrs. Smith: "First Date" – Kyle Reiter and Isaac Hagy (Prime Video); Slow Horses: "Identity Theft" – Robert Frost (Apple TV+)	What We Do in the Shadows: "Sleep Hypnosis" – Liza Cardinale and Dane McMaster (FX); The Bear: "Tomorrow" – Joanna Naugle (FX / Hulu); Curb Your Enthusiasm: "The Gettysburg Address" – Steven Rasch (HBO); Nobody Wants This: "Pilot" – Maura Corey (Netflix); Only Murders in the Building: "My Best Friend's Wedding" – Shelly Westerman and Payton Koch (Hulu)
Best Edited Multi-Camera Comedy Series	Best Edited Limited Series
Frasier: "My Brilliant Sister" – Russell Griffin (Paramount+); Poppa's House: "Sleepover" – Angel Gamboa Bryant (CBS); The Upshaws: "Do I?" – Angel Gamboa Bryant and Brian LeCoz (Netflix)	Baby Reindeer: "Episode 4" – Peter H. Oliver and Benjamin Gerstein (Netflix); Disclaimer: "V" – Adam Gough (Apple TV+); Fargo: "Bisquik" – Regis Kimble (FX); The Penguin: "After Hours" – Henk Van Eeghen (HBO); Ripley: "V Lucio" – Joshua Raymond Lee and David O. Rogers (Netflix)
Best Edited Documentary Series	Best Edited Non-Scripted Series
Chimp Crazy: "Gone Ape" – Evan Wise, Charles Divak, Adrienne Gits, and Doug Abel (HBO); The Jinx: Part Two: "Saving My Tears Until It's Official" – Richard Hankin and Charles Olivier (HBO); Quiet on Set: The Dark Side of Kids TV: "Hidden in Plain Sight" – Daphne Gómez-Mena and Jane Jo (Investigation Discovery); STEVE! (Martin): A Documentary in 2 Pieces: "Now" – Jeff Malmberg and Aaron I. Naar (Apple TV+); STEVE! (Martin): A Documentary in 2 Pieces: "Then" – Alan Lowe (Apple TV+)	Welcome to Wrexham: "Temporary" – Tim Wilsbach, Steve Welch, Michael Brown, Michael Oliver, Tim Roche, Matt Wafaie, and Jenny Krochmal (FX); Conan O'Brien Must Go: "Ireland" – Matthew Shaw and Brad Roelandt (Max); Couples Therapy: "Episode 1" – Ryan Loeffler and Eileen Meyer (Showtime)
Best Edited Variety Talk/Sketch Show or Special	Best Edited Animated Series
Last Week Tonight with John Oliver: "Boeing" – Anthony Miale (HBO / Max); Ali Wong: Single Lady – Sean Hubbert (Netflix); John Mulaney Presents: Everybody's in LA: "Paranormal" – Kelly Lyon, Sean McIlraith, and Ryan McIlraith (Netflix)	X-Men '97: "Remember It" – Michelle McMillan (Disney+); Bob's Burgers: "Butt Sweat and Fears" – Stephanie Earley and Jeremy Reuben (Fox); The Simpsons: "Night of the Living Wage" – Don Barrozo (Fox)

=== Career Achievement Award ===
- Paul Hirsch
- Maysie Hoy

=== Golden Eddie Filmmaker of the Year ===
- Jon M. Chu
