= American Cinema Editors Awards 2024 =

74th ACE Eddie Awards
- Presented by: American Cinema Editors
- Date: March 3, 2024
- Site: Royce Hall, Los Angeles, California

Highlights
- Best Film: Drama: Oppenheimer
- Best Film: Comedy: The Holdovers

The 74th American Cinema Editors Eddie Awards were presented on March 3, 2024, at the Royce Hall in Los Angeles, honoring the best editors in film and television of 2023. The nominees were announced on January 25, 2024. John Waters was honored with the ACE Golden Eddie Filmmaker of the Year Award, while Kate Amend and Walter Murch both received the Career Achievement Award.

== Winners and nominees ==
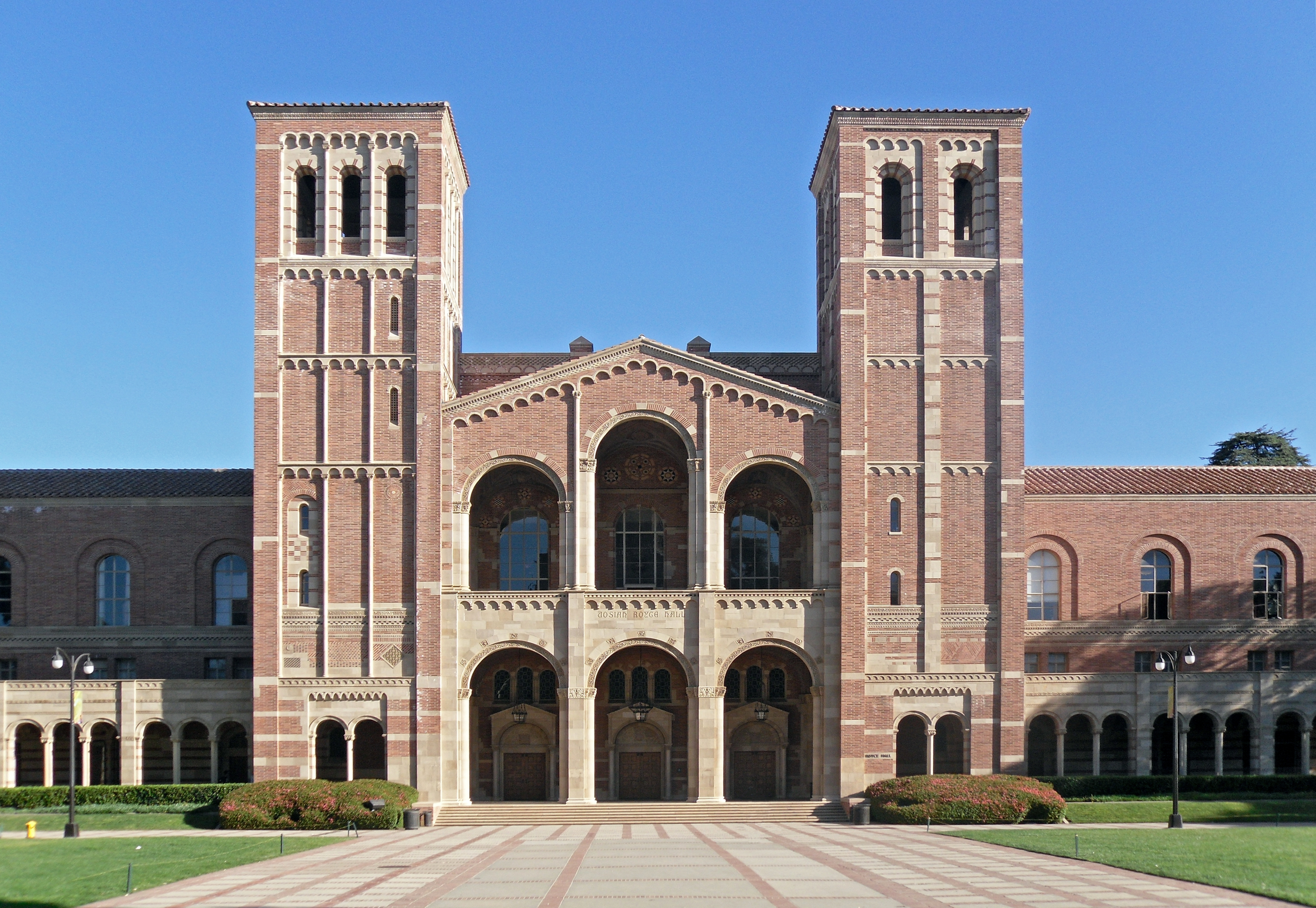
Royce Hall, the site of the 74th American Cinema Editors Eddie Awards

=== Film ===
| Best Edited Feature Film (Drama, Theatrical) | Best Edited Feature Film (Comedy, Theatrical) |
|---|---|
| Oppenheimer – Jennifer Lame; Anatomy of a Fall – Laurent Sénéchal; Killers of the Flower Moon – Thelma Schoonmaker; Maestro – Michelle Tesoro; Past Lives – Keith Fraase | The Holdovers – Kevin Tent; Air – William Goldenberg; American Fiction – Hilda Rasula; Barbie – Nick Houy; Poor Things – Yorgos Mavropsaridis |
| Best Edited Documentary (Theatrical) | Best Edited Animated Feature Film (Theatrical or Non-Theatrical) |
| Still: A Michael J. Fox Movie – Michael Harte; 20 Days in Mariupol – Michelle Mizner; American Symphony – Sammy Dane, Matthew Heineman, Jim Hession, and Fernando Villegas; Joan Baez: I Am a Noise – Maeve O'Boyle; Little Richard: I Am Everything – Nyneve Minnear and Jake Hostetter | Spider-Man: Across the Spider-Verse – Michael Andrews; Elemental – Stephen Schaffer; Nimona – Randy Trager and Erin Crackel; The Super Mario Bros. Movie – Eric Osmond; Teenage Mutant Ninja Turtles: Mutant Mayhem – Greg Levitan |
Best Edited Documentary (Non-Theatrical)
Escaping Twin Flames: "Up in Flames" – Martin Biehn, Kevin Hibbard, Inbal B. Lessner, Troy Takaki, and Mimi Wilcox (Netflix); 100 Foot Wave: "Jaws" – Alex Bayer, Alex Keipper, and Quin O'Brien (HBO); Albert Brooks: Defending My Life – Bob Joyce (HBO); Beckham: "The Kick" – Michael Harte (Netflix); Being Mary Tyler Moore – Mariah Rehmet (HBO)

=== Television ===
| Best Edited Drama Series | Best Edited Single-Camera Comedy Series |
|---|---|
| The Last of Us: "Long, Long Time" – Timothy A. Good (HBO); Ahsoka: "Part Four: Fallen Jedi" – Dana E. Glauberman (Disney+); Slow Horses: "Strange Games" – Sam Williams (Apple TV+); Succession: "Connor's Wedding" – Bill Henry (HBO); Succession: "With Open Eyes" – Ken Eluto (HBO) | The Bear: "Fishes" – Joanna Naugle (FX / Hulu); Barry: "wow" – Ali Greer and Franky Guttman (HBO); The Bear: "Forks" – Adam Epstein (FX / Hulu); Only Murders in the Building: "Sitzprobe" – Shelly Westerman and Payton Koch (Hulu); Ted Lasso: "So Long, Farewell" – Melissa McCoy (Apple TV+) |
| Best Edited Multi-Camera Comedy Series | Best Edited Limited Series |
| How I Met Your Father: "Daddy" – Russell Griffin (Hulu); Frasier: "Blind Date" – Joseph Fulton (Paramount+); The Upshaws: "Off Beat" – Angel Gamboa Bryant (Netflix) | Beef: "The Birds Don't Sing, They Screech in Pain" – Harry Yoon and Laura Zempel (Netflix); Beef: "The Great Fabricator" – Nat Fuller (Netflix); Fargo: "The Paradox of Intermediate Transactions" – Christopher Nelson (FX); Fargo: "The Tragedy of the Commons" – Regis Kimble (FX); Lessons in Chemistry: "Introduction to Chemistry" – Géraud Brisson and Daniel Martens (Apple TV+) |
| Best Edited Feature Film (Non-Theatrical) | Best Edited Non-Scripted Series |
| Reality – Jennifer Vecchiarello and Ron Dulin (HBO); Black Mirror: "Beyond the Sea" – Jon Harris (Netflix); Flamin' Hot – Kayla M. Emter and Liza D. Espinas (Hulu) | Couples Therapy: "Episode 310" – Delaney Lynch, Helen Kearns, and Katrina Taylor (Netflix); Dancing with the Stars: "Most Memorable Year Night" – Laurens Van Charante, Ben Bulatao, Fernanda Cardoso, Jessie Sock, Jon Oliver, Neal Acosta, Raiko Siems, Joe Headrick, and Mike Bennaton (ABC / Disney+); Deadliest Catch: "Pain Level Ten" – Rob Butler, Isaiah Camp, Alexander Rubinow, and Josh Stockero (Discovery) |
| Best Edited Variety Talk/Sketch Show or Special Event | Best Edited Animated Series |
| Taylor Swift: The Eras Tour – Dom Whitworth, Guy Harding, Hamish Lyons, Rupa Rathod, Ben Wainwright-Pearce, and Reg Wrench (Disney+); A Black Lady Sketch Show: "My Love Language Is Words of Defamation" – Stephanie Filo, Malinda Zehner Guerra, and Taylor Joy Mason (HBO); Last Week Tonight with John Oliver: "Dollar Stores" – Anthony Miale (HBO) | Blue Eye Samurai: "The Tale of the Ronin and the Bride" – Yuka Shirasuna (Netflix); Bob's Burgers: "Amelia" – Jeremy Reuben and Stephanie Earley (Fox); Scott Pilgrim Takes Off: "Ramona Rents a Video" – Keisuke Yanagi (Netflix) |

=== Anne V. Coates Award ===
- Ariel Emma Martin – Chapman University
  - Isaiah Clarke – Spanish Springs High School
  - Jamie Diaz – California State University, Los Angeles
