= System (The Bear) =

- The Bear episode
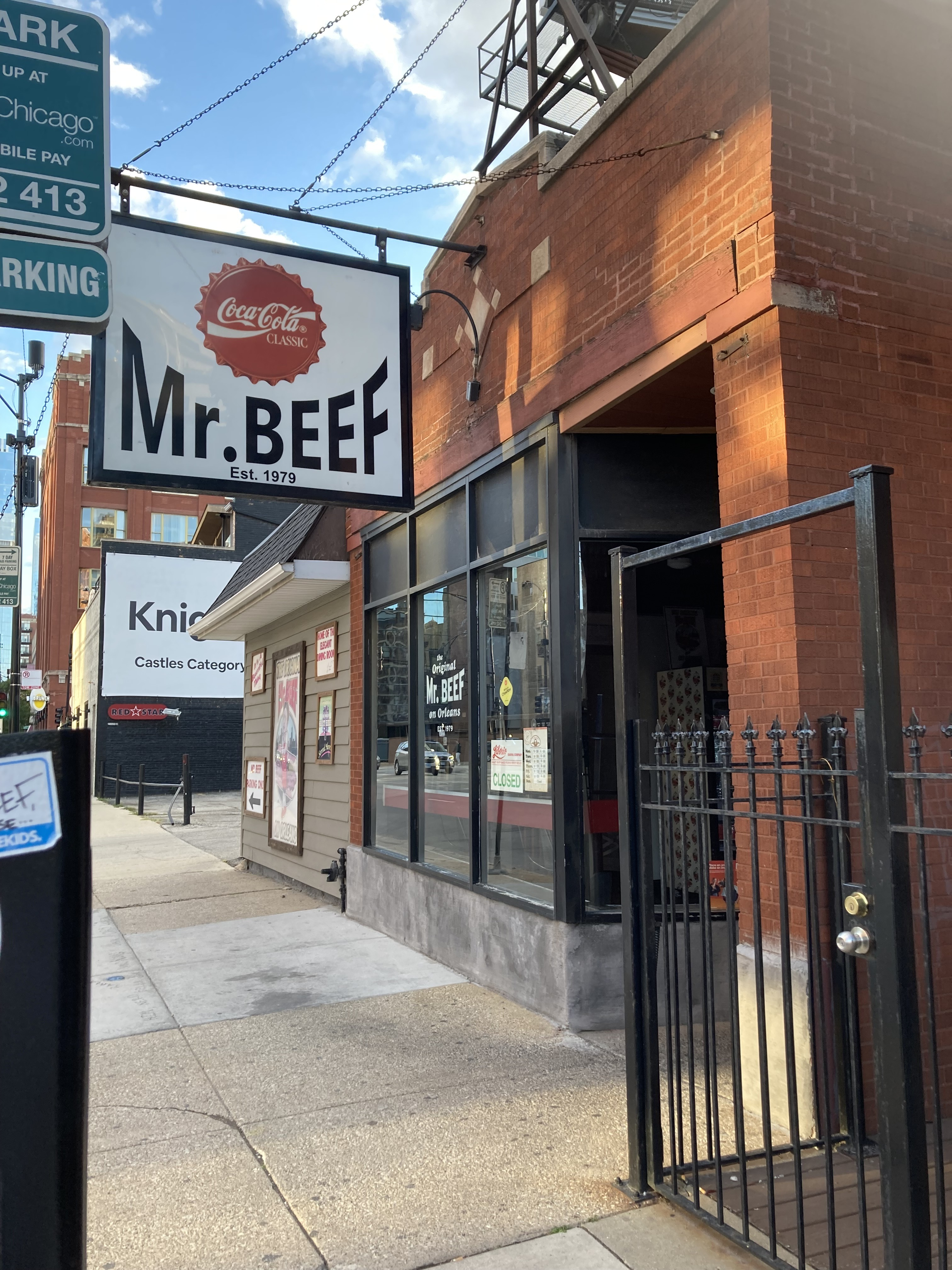
- Mr. Beef, the shooting location for the pilot
- Episode no.: Season 1 Episode 1
- Directed by: Christopher Storer
- Written by: Christopher Storer
- Cinematography by: Adam Newport-Berra
- Editing by: Joanna Naugle
- Production code: XCBV1001
- Original release date: June 23, 2022
- Running time: 28 minutes

Guest appearances
- Matty Matheson as Neil Fak; Edwin Lee Gibson as Ebraheim; Corey Hendrix as Gary "Sweeps" Woods; P. J. Fishwick as Wrigley, the delivery guy

Episode chronology
← Previous —	Next → "Hands"
- The Bear season 1

"System" is the series premiere of the American television comedy-drama The Bear. The episode was written by series creator Christopher Storer. It was released on Hulu on June 23, 2022, along with the rest of the season.

The series follows Carmen "Carmy" Berzatto, an award-winning New York City chef de cuisine, who returns to his hometown of Chicago to run his late brother Michael's failing Italian beef sandwich shop. The episode introduces the characters, as well as Carmy's internal conflict in trying to keep the shop afloat.

The premiere received highly positive reviews from critics, who praised its cast and production values. It won two Emmy Awards, including Outstanding Writing for a Comedy Series.

== Plot ==
After having a dream where he releases a caged bear from a cage on the Clark Street Bridge, Carmen "Carmy" Berzatto goes to his job at The Original Beef of Chicagoland sandwich shop, which had been opened by his absentee father and owned by Carmy's older brother Michael until his death several weeks ago. Having returned to his hometown of Chicago, Carmy finds it difficult to run the place, particularly over receiving shipment and due payments. He sells denim jackets from his collection and collects quarters from the shop's arcade games to make ends meet.

Carmy operates the shop with Michael's best friend, manager Richard "Richie" Jerimovich; baker Marcus Brooks; cooks Tina Marrero and Ebraheim; and handyman Neil Fak. He interviews a new applicant, chef Sydney Adamu. She has experience, having trained at the Culinary Institute of America, and admires Carmy's career achievements, which includes the James Beard Foundation Award, and wants the job as The Beef is her father's favorite restaurant. Carmy hires her, although he does not disclose why he is working at the Beef.

As Carmy tries to improve the shop, the stubborn staff resist his efforts to modernize the restaurant. While having lunch, Carmy goes outside to control a crowd that gathered to play for an arcade game in the shop. When the scene soon escalates, Richie goes outside and fires a gun in the air to control the crowd. After getting back to the shop, Richie reminds Carmy that he has no idea how the shop works and that he must adhere to their "system" instead. As he tries to open a can of tomatoes for the shop's spaghetti dish that he doesn't want to make, Carmy instead drops it in the trash.

== Production ==
=== Development ===
Series creator Christopher Storer had originally written the story as a feature film concept before it was developed into a series for FX Networks. The pilot episode was ordered in March 2021. Producer Hiro Murai had previously directed episodes of Atlanta and Donald Glover's "This Is America" music video. The pilot was filmed in Chicago in July 2021. The show was picked up to series in October 2021, with main castmembers Jeremy Allen White, Ebon Moss-Bachrach, Ayo Edebiri, Lionel Boyce, Abby Elliott, and Liza Colón-Zayas, plus Edwin Lee Gibson and Matty Matheson playing recurring characters. In May 2022, Hulu confirmed that the first episode of the season would be titled "System", and was to be written by Storer, marking his first writing and directing credit for the series.

=== Casting ===
Casting director Sharon Bachrach put together a book of five potential actors for each part. Christopher Storer had previously worked with Jeremy Allen White on The Rental and wanted him for the part. Storer also had Edebiri top of mind from the beginning. Ayo Edebiri read for the part over video call from New York City; she never tested opposite White.

=== Production design ===
Brooklyn-based game designer and artist Diego E. Garcia designed Ballbreaker, with inspiration from Streets of Rage particularly as well as the Street Fighter series. Garcia ultimately provided a "short attract mode sequence that included the game starting up, a character select sequence, and a few fights. They wanted an almost broken look to the game, with choppy animation and general low-res jank."

=== Costuming ===
The costume designer for the pilot was Cristina Spiridakis.

=== Filming ===
The pilot was filmed in July 2021. Much of the pilot episode was filmed on location at Mr. Beef, a real family-owned Italian beef sandwich shop in Chicago. According to Chris Zucchero, son of the original owner, Joseph Zucchero (who started the place in 1979), the "pilot was shot entirely at Mr. Beef as far as the dining room, but the back of the house stuff was all shot in a separate kitchen." The kitchen space for the pilot was a production rental called Trogo, a pop-up restaurant space on Diversey Avenue.

The cinematographer for the pilot was Adam Newport-Berra. Due to a combination of factors, including the configuration of the building's lights and the reflective stainless steel fixtures, there was very limited RF bandwidth available for use by the production sound team on the pilot shoot. They made do with wireless microphones, and one experienced boom operator, and any deficiencies in the recorded sound were patched over by dialogue editor Evan Benjamin and re-recording mixer Steve "Major" Giammaria.

=== Editing ===
Film editor Joanna Naugle told Post Perspective, "When we were cutting the pilot, Chris said it should feel like you are drowning—like you were thrown into the deep end of a pool, and it's sink or swim. I never got the note 'make it crazier' before, but I just kept getting that note." Her first cut of the pilot ran 39 minutes.

=== Music ===
The soundtrack for the episode includes "Old Engine Oil" by the Budos Band, "Don't Give a Damn" by Serengeti, "Don't Blame Steve" by Serengeti (a rap that recounts an alternate history exculpating Steve for the Steve Bartman incident), "Via Chicago" by Wilco, and "Animal" by Pearl Jam. "Via Chicago" was also used as the main theme for the season 1 trailer.

Naugle commented, "We played so much with music. There are actually scenes where two different tracks are playing, and one will become louder when Carmy's talking and louder when Richie's talking, and it's just supposed to create this feeling of 'Who's in charge?'" Pearl Jam plays over the closing credits; Storer explained the decision to have the episode end with "Animal" during the credits, "We were making a statement that this is a loud show, and you are either in or out. I think it's very much not your thing, or it is very much your thing. I don't think there is too much of a middle ground. Ending the first episode with 'Animal' added this punctuation mark."

== Release ==
The episode, along with the rest of the first season, premiered on June 23, 2022.

== Reception ==
=== Critical reviews ===
"System" received highly positive reviews from critics. Marah Eakin of Vulture gave the episode a 4 star out of 5 rating and wrote, "Episode one, “System,” is really just about establishing the vibe and drama of The Bear, and it does a good job. You leave its tight 27 minutes with more questions than you entered with, and you want to stick around to find out the answers."

Mia Sidoti of MovieWeb named the episode as the sixth best of the season, writing "The pilot of The Bear doesn't have time for introductions and throws you right into the chaos of it all as Carmy tries to win over his crew and also make some extra money since they're broke. You find yourself fighting to remember exactly who is who in the first 20 minutes, wrinkling your nose at how brash Richie is, and feeling bad for Sydney as she gets mixed into the mess that is The Beef."

=== Accolades ===
For the episode, Christopher Storer won Outstanding Writing for a Comedy Series at the 75th Primetime Emmy Awards.

Year	Award	Category	Nominee(s)	Result	Ref.
2023	ACE Eddie Awards	Best Edited Single-Camera Comedy Series	Joanna Naugle	Won	
2024	Astra TV Awards	Best Writing in a Streaming Comedy Series	Christopher Storer	Won	
2024	Primetime Emmy Awards	Outstanding Writing for a Comedy Series	Christopher Storer	Won	
2024	Primetime Creative Arts Emmy Awards	Outstanding Picture Editing for a Single-Camera Comedy Series	Joanna Naugle	Won	
2024	Primetime Creative Arts Emmy Awards	Outstanding Production Design for a Narrative Program (Half-Hour)	Sam Lisenco, Eric Dean, and Emily Carter	Nominated	

== Sources ==
- Smith, Scott D. (Fall 2025). "The Bear: The Challenges of Managing Kitchen Chaos". Production Sound & Video. 17 (4). North Hollywood, California: IATSE 695: 32–37.
