= American Cinema Editors Awards 2023 =

73rd ACE Eddie Awards
- Presented by: American Cinema Editors
- Date: March 5, 2023
- Site: Royce Hall, Los Angeles, California

Highlights
- Best Film: Drama: Top Gun: Maverick
- Best Film: Comedy: Everything Everywhere All at Once

The 73rd American Cinema Editors Eddie Awards were presented on March 5, 2023, at the Royce Hall in Los Angeles, honoring the best editors in films and television of 2022. The nominees were announced on February 1, 2023.

Gina Prince-Bythewood was honored with the ACE Golden Eddie Filmmaker of the Year Award, while Lynne Willingham and Don Zimmerman both received the Career Achievement Award.

== Winners and nominees ==
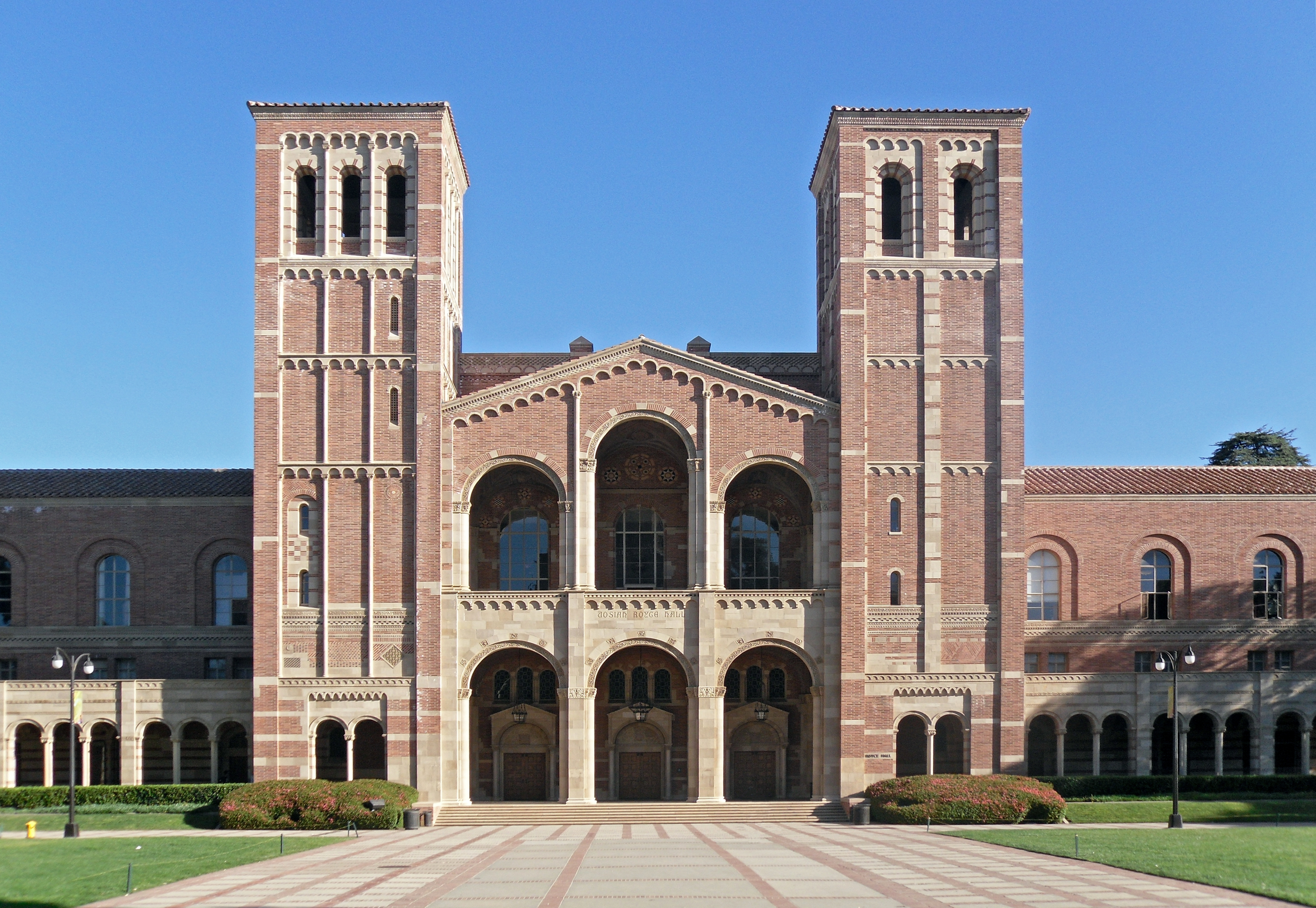
Royce Hall, the site of the 73rd American Cinema Editors Eddie Awards

=== Film ===
Best Edited Feature Film (Drama, Theatrical)	Best Edited Feature Film (Comedy, Theatrical)
Top Gun: Maverick – Eddie Hamilton; All Quiet on the Western Front – Sven Budelmann; Elvis – Matt Villa and Jonathan Redmond; Tár – Monika Willi; The Woman King – Terilyn A. Shropshire	Everything Everywhere All at Once – Paul Rogers; The Banshees of Inisherin – Mikkel E. G. Nielsen; Glass Onion: A Knives Out Mystery – Bob Ducsay; The Menu – Christopher Tellefsen; Triangle of Sadness – Ruben Östlund and Mikel Cee Karlsson
Best Edited Documentary (Theatrical)	Best Edited Animated Feature Film (Theatrical or Non-Theatrical)
Fire of Love – Erin Casper and Jocelyne Chaput; All the Beauty and the Bloodshed – Amy Foote, Joe Bini, and Brian A. Kates; Good Night Oppy – Rejh Cabrera and Helen Kearns; Moonage Daydream – Brett Morgen; Navalny – Maya Hawke and Langdon Page	Guillermo del Toro's Pinocchio – Ken Schretzmann and Holly Klein; The Bad Guys – John Venzon; Marcel the Shell with Shoes On – Dean Fleischer Camp and Nick Paley; Puss in Boots: The Last Wish – James Ryan; Turning Red – Nicholas C. Smith and Steve Bloom
Best Edited Documentary (Non-Theatrical)
George Carlin's American Dream – Joe Beshenkovsky (HBO Max); The Andy Warhol Diaries: "Collab: Andy & Basquiat" – Steve Ross (Netflix); The Last Movie Stars: "Luck Is an Art" – Barry Poltermann (HBO Max); Lucy and Desi – Robert A. Martinez (Prime Video); Pelosi in the House – Geof Bartz (HBO)

=== Television ===
Best Edited Drama Series	Best Edited Single-Camera Comedy Series
Andor: "One Way Out" – Simon Smith (Disney+); Euphoria: "Stand Still Like the Hummingbird" – Julio C. Pérez IV and Aaron I. Butler (HBO); Euphoria: "The Theater and Its Double" – Julio C. Pérez IV, Laura Zempel, and Nikola Boyanov (HBO); Severance: "In Perpetuity" – Geoffrey Richman and Erica Freed Marker (Apple TV+); Severance: "The We We Are" – Geoffrey Richman (Apple TV+)	The Bear: "System" – Joanna Naugle (Hulu); Atlanta: "Andrew Wyeth. Alfred's World." – Kyle Reiter and Isaac Hagy (FX); Barry: "710N" – Franky Guttman (HBO); Barry: "starting now" – Ali Greer (HBO); Only Murders in the Building: "I Know Who Did It" – Shelly Westerman and Payton Koch (Hulu)
Best Edited Multi-Camera Comedy Series	Best Edited Limited Series
The Neighborhood: "Welcome to the Art of Negotiation" – Chris Poulos (CBS); The Conners "Of Missing Minds and Missing Fries" – Brian Schnuckel (ABC); How I Met Your Father: "Timing Is Everything" – Sue Federman (Hulu)	The White Lotus: "Arrivederci" – John M. Valerio (HBO); Gaslit: "Year of the Rat" – Joe Leonard (Starz); Obi-Wan Kenobi: "Part VI" – Kelley Dixon and Josh Earl (Disney+); Station Eleven: "Unbroken Circle" – Anna Hauger, David Eisenberg, Yoni Reiss, and Anthony McAfee (HBO Max); The White Lotus: "Abductions" – Heather Persons (HBO)
Best Edited Feature Film (Non-Theatrical)	Best Edited Non-Scripted Series
Weird: The Al Yankovic Story – Jamie Kennedy (The Roku Channel); Fire Island – Brian A. Kates (Hulu); Hocus Pocus 2 – Julia Wong (Disney+); A Jazzman's Blues – Maysie Hoy (Netflix); Prey – Angela M. Catanzaro and Claudia Castello (Hulu)	Vice: "Killing for Success & Marcos Returns" – Paula Salhany, Brandon Kiefer, Andrew Pattison, Catherine Lee, and Victoria Lesiw (Showtime); Deadliest Catch: "Sailor's Delight" – Isaiah Camp, Joe Mikan, and Alexander Rubinow (Discovery Channel); Formula 1: Drive to Survive: "Hard Racing" – Cassie Bennitt, Matt Rudge, Duncan Moir, Nic Zimmermann, Jack Foxton, and Neil Clarkson (Netflix)
Best Edited Variety Talk/Sketch Show or Special	Best Edited Animated Series
A Black Lady Sketch Show: "Save My Edges, I'm a Donor!" – Stephanie Filo, Bradinn French, Taylor Mason, and S. Robyn Wilson (HBO); Last Week Tonight with John Oliver: "Police Interrogations" – Ryan Barger and Anthony Milae (HBO); My Next Guest Needs No Introduction with David Letterman "Volodymyr Zelenskyy Special" – Cori Wapnowska and Jon Higgins (Netflix)	Love, Death & Robots: "Bad Travelling" – Kirk Baxter (Netflix); Big Mouth: "Dadda Dia!" – Felipe Salazar (Netflix); Bob's Burgers: "Some Like It Bot Part 1: Eighth Grade Runner" – Jeremy Reuben (Fox)

=== Anne V. Coates Award ===
- Jazmin Jamias – American Film Institute
  - Adriana Guevara – New York University
  - Tianze Sun – American Film Institute
