= American Cinema Editors Award for Best Edited Documentary – Feature =

Annual US film award

- Awarded for: Best Editing for a Documentary Feature Film
- Country: United States
- Presented by: American Cinema Editors (ACE)
- Currently held by: Still: A Michael J. Fox Movie – Michael Harte (2023)
- Website: americancinemaeditors.org

The American Cinema Editors Award for Best Edited Documentary – Feature is one of the annual awards given by the American Cinema Editors, awarded to what members of the American Cinema Editors Guild deem as the best edited feature documentary film for a given year. Until 2013, this category included television documentaries, both single films and episodes of documentary series.

This award has been a good indicator of the winners and nominees for the Academy Award for Best Film Editing as in the case of Hoop Dreams.

== Winners and nominees ==
=== 1970s ===
Best Edited Documentary (Feature or Television)

Year	Program	Episode(s)	Nominees	Network
1972
1972	The Bengal Tiger		Axel Hubert Sr.	
1972	Julie		Peter C. Johnson, Arthur Schneider, and David Newhouse	
1972	The Undersea World of Jacques Cousteau	"The Forgotten Mermaids"	John Soh	ABC

Best Edited Documentary

Year	Program	Episode(s)	Nominees	Network
1973
1973	Survival	"Flight of the Snow Geese"	Leslie Parry	NBC
1973	The Undersea World of Jacques Cousteau	"The Forgotten Mermaids"	John Soh	ABC
1973	Walls of Fire		Gene Fowler Jr.	
1974
1974	That's Entertainment!		Bud Friedgen and David Blewitt	
1974	Animals Are Beautiful People		Jamie Uys	
1974	Following the Tundra Wolf		Peter Honess	
1975
1975	National Geographic Specials	"Search for the Great Apes"	David Saxon	PBS
1975	National Geographic Specials	"This Britain: Heritage of the Sea"	David Newhouse	PBS
1975	The Undersea World of Jacques Cousteau	"The Seabirds of Isabela"	John Soh	ABC
1976
1976	Life Goes to the Movies		Robert K. Lambert and Peter C. Johnson	NBC
1976	The Memory of Justice		Inge Behrens	
1976	That's Entertainment, Part II		Bud Friedgen and David Blewitt	
1977
1977	Life Goes to War: Hollywood and the Home Front		David Blewitt and John Wright	NBC
1977	Gentile Giants of the Pacific		Leslie Parry	
1977	Oscar Presents: The War Movies and John Wayne		William Cartwright and Jeffery Weston	
1978
1978	The Living Sands of Namib		David Saxon	
1978	Mickey's 50		Lloyd L. Richardson	NBC
1978	The Secret Life of Plants		Robert K. Lambert, Chris Lebenzon and Ian Masters	
1979
1979	Wild Kingdom	"Desert Spring"	Bernard Braham	Syndication
1979	National Geographic Specials	"Gold"	David Saxon	PBS

=== 1980s ===
Year	Program	Episode(s)	Nominees	Network
1980
1980	Can't It Be Anyone Else		Michael Chandler	ABC
1980	The Superliners: Twilight of an Era		Barry Nye	PBS
1980	Whatever Happened to Lori Jean Lloyd		David Saxon	
1981
1981	The Day After Trinity		David Webb Peoples and Ralph Wikke	
1981	Clipperton: The Island Time Forgot		John Soh	
1981	Wild Kingdom	"Before the Storms of Winter"	Bernard Braham	Syndication
1982 (22nd)
1982 (22nd)	The Thames		Peter C. Johnson	
1982 (22nd)	Burden of Dreams		Maureen Gosling	
1983
1983	The Weavers: Wasn't That a Time!		Paul Barnes	
1983	Adapt or Die		Pat Cook	ABC
1983	Say Amen, Somebody		Paul Barnes	
1984
1984	Among the Wild Chimpanzees		Barry Nye	
1984	Heritage: Civilization and the Jews	"Out of the Ashes"	Laurence Solomon	
1984	Wild Kingdom	"Lions of the Mara"	Bernard Braham	Syndication
1985
1985	Land of the Tiger		Barry Nye	PBS
1985	Creation of the Universe		Robert Estrin and Lisa Day	PBS
1985	The Statue of Liberty		Paul Barnes	PBS
1986
1986	Home Free: Return of the Bald Eagle		Christopher Knight	
1986	Grizzly: The Shining Mountains		John Howe	
1986	Mother Teresa		Thomas Haneke	PBS
1986	Realm of the Alligator		Barry Nye	PBS
1987
1987	The Infinite Voyage	"Unseen Worlds"	John Soh and Catherine Shields	PBS
1987	Lions of the African Night		Barry Nye	PBS
1987	Treasures from the Past		Barry Nye	PBS
1988
1988	The Explorers: A Century of Discovery		Barry Nye and Catherine Shields	PBS
1988	Eyes on the Prize		Charles Scott, Jeanne Jordan, Ann Bartholomew and Dan Eisenberg	PBS
1988	The Thin Blue Line		Paul Barnes	
1989
1989	Roger & Me		Wendey Stanzler and Jennifer Beman	
1989	Gary Cooper: American Life, American Legend		Murray Jordan	TNT
1989	The Infinite Voyage	"The Great Dinosaur Hunt"	John Soh	PBS

=== 1990s ===
Year	Program	Episode(s)	Nominees	Network
1990
1990	This Reporter	"Episode 1"	Deborah Peretz and Edward R. Murrow	
1990	The Civil War	"'The Better Angels of Our Nature' (1865)"	Paul Barnes, Bruce Shaw and Tricia Reidy	PBS
1990	Journey to the Forgotten River		Barry Nye	PBS
1991
1991	Hearts of Darkness: A Filmmaker's Apocalypse		Michael Greer and Jay Miracle	
1991	Berkeley in the Sixties		Veronica Selver	
1991	Madonna: Truth or Dare		Barry Alexander Brown	
1992
1992	MGM: When the Lion Roars		Robert L. Sinise	TNT
1992	American Experience	"The Donner Party"	Bruce Shaw	PBS
1992	Fires of Kuwait		Barbara Kerr	
1993
1993	National Geographic Specials	"Survivers of the Skeleton"	Barry Nye and Leslie Parry	PBS
1993	Baraka		Ron Fricke, Mark Magidson and David Aubrey	
1993	Visions of Light		Arnold Glassman	
1994
1994	Hoop Dreams		Steve James, Frederick Marx and William Haugse	
1994	Africa: The Serengeti		Tim Huntley	
1994	That's Entertainment! III		Bud Friedgen and Michael J. Sheridan	
1995
1995	Unzipped		Paula Heredia	
1995	30 Years of National Geographic Specials		Barry Nye	PBS
1995	Crumb		Victor Livingston	
1996
1996	Looking for Richard		William A. Anderson, Ned Bastille, Andre Ross Betz and Pasquale Buba	
1996	National Geographic Specials	"Last Feast of the Crocodiles"	Barry Nye and David Hughes	PBS
1996	The Wild Bunch: An Album in Montage		Paul Seydor	
1997
1997	Frank Capra's American Dream		Arnold Glassman	
1997	Lewis & Clark: The Journey of the Corps of Discovery		Paul Barnes and Erik Ewers	PBS
1997	Year of the Horse		Jay Rabinowitz	
1998
1998	Dancemaker		Pam Wise	
1998	The Cruise		Michael Levine	
1998	The Last Days		James Moll	

Best Edited Documentary Film

Year	Program	Episode(s)	Nominees	Network
1999
1999	Old Man River		Allan Holzman	
1999	Buena Vista Social Club		Brian Johnson and Monica Anderson	
1999	Hitchcock: Shadow of a Genius		Arnold Glassman	

=== 2000s ===
Year	Program	Episode(s)	Nominees	Network
2000
2000	Into the Arms of Strangers: Stories of the Kindertransport		Kate Amend	
2000	Judy's Time		Erin Flannery and David Klagsbrun	
2000	Shooting War		Bryan McKenzie	
2001
2001	New York: A Documentary Film	"The City and the World (1945–2000)"	Julie Parroni	PBS
2001	Chop Suey		Angelo Corrao	
2001	The Endurance: Shackleton's Legendary Antarctic Expedition		Joshua Waletzky	
2002
2002	Bowling for Columbine		Kurt Engfehr	
2002	The Kid Stays in the Picture		Jun Diaz	
2002	Sounds of Memphis		Allan Holzman	
2003
2003	Spellbound		Yana Gorskaya	
2003	Capturing the Friedmans		Richard Hankin	
2003	The Fog of War		Doug Abel, Chyld King and Karen Schmeer	
2004
2004	Riding Giants		Paul Crowder	
2004	Fahrenheit 9/11		Kurt Engfehr, Woody Richman, Christopher Seward	
2004	My Architect		Sabine Krayenbühl	
2005
2005	March of the Penguins		Sabine Emiliani	
2005	Grizzly Man		Joe Bini	
2005	James Dean: Forever Young		Michael J. Sheridan, Jack Tucker, Patrea Patrick and Fred Roth	
2006
2006	An Inconvenient Truth		Jay Cassidy and Dan Swietlik	
2006	Baghdad ER		Joe Bini	HBO
2006	When the Levees Broke: A Requiem in Four Acts	"Part One"	Samuel D. Pollard	HBO

Best Edited Documentary

Year	Program	Episode(s)	Nominees	Network
2007
2007	Sicko		Geoffrey Richman, Christopher Seward and Dan Swietlik	
2007	Darfur Now		Edgar Burcksen and Leonard Feinstein	
2007	The Pixar Story		Leslie Iwerks and Stephen R. Myers	
2008
2008	Man on Wire		Jinx Godfrey	
2008	Chicago 10		Stuart Levy	
2008	Frontline	"Bush's War: Part I" & "Bush's War: Part II"	Steve Audette	PBS
2009
2009	The Cove		Geoffrey Richman	
2009	Food, Inc.		Kim Roberts	
2009	Michael Jackson's This Is It		Don Brochu, Brandon Key, Timothy Patterson and Kevin Stitt	

=== 2010s ===
Year	Program	Episode(s)	Nominees	Network
2010
2010	Exit Through the Gift Shop		Tom Fulford and Chris King	
2010	Inside Job		Chad Beck and Adam Bolt	
2010	Waiting for "Superman"		Jay Cassidy, Greg Finton and Kim Roberts	
2011
2011	Freedom Riders		Lewis Erskine and Aljernon Tunsil	
2011	Cave of Forgotten Dreams		Joe Bini and	
2011	George Harrison: Living in the Material World		David Tedeschi	HBO

Best Edited Documentary - Feature

Year	Film	Editor(s)
2012
2012	Searching for Sugar Man	Malik Bendjelloul
2012	Samsara	Ron Fricke and Mark Magidson
2012	West of Memphis	Billy McMillin
2013
2013	20 Feet from Stardom	Jason Zeldes, Kevin Klauber and Doug Blush
2013	Blackfish	Eli B. Despres
2013	Tim's Vermeer	Patrick Sheffield
2014
2014	Citizenfour	Mathilde Bonnefoy
2014	Finding Vivian Maier	Aaron Wickenden
2014	Glen Campbell: I'll Be Me	Elisa Bonora
2015
2015	Amy	Chris King
2015	Cobain: Montage of Heck	Joe Beshenkovsky and Brett Morgen
2015	Going Clear: Scientology & the Prison of Belief	Andy Grieve
2015	He Named Me Malala	Greg Finton, Brian Johnson and Brad Fuller
2015	The Wrecking Crew	Claire Scanlon
2016
2016	O.J.: Made in America	Bret Granato, Maya Mumma and Ben Sozanski
2016	13th	Spencer Averick
2016	Amanda Knox	Matthew Hamachek
2016	The Beatles: Eight Days a Week - The Touring Years	Paul Crowder
2016	Weiner	Eli B. Despres
2017
2017	Jane	Joe Beshenkovsky, Will Znidaric and Brett Morgen
2017	Cries from Syria	Aaron I. Butler
2017	Joan Didion: The Center Will Not Hold	Ann Collins
2017	LA 92	Daniel Lindsay, T.J. Martin and Scott Stevenson
2018
2018	Free Solo	Bob Eisenhardt
2018	RBG	Carla Gutierrez
2018	Three Identical Strangers	Michael Harte
2018	Won't You Be My Neighbor?	Jeff Malmberg and Aaron Wickenden
2019
2019	Apollo 11	Todd Douglas Miller
2019	American Factory	Lindsay Utz
2019	Linda Ronstadt: The Sound of My Voice	Jake Pushinsky and Heidi Scharfe
2019	Making Waves: The Art of Cinematic Sound	David J. Turner and Thomas G. Miller

=== 2020s ===
Best Edited Documentary - Feature

Year	Film	Editor(s)
2020
2020	My Octopus Teacher	Pippa Ehrlich, Dan Schwalm
2020	All In: The Fight for Democracy	Nancy Novack
2020	Dick Johnson Is Dead	Nels Bangerter
2020	The Dissident	Scott D. Hanson, James Leche, Wyatt Rogowski, Avner Shiloah
2020	The Social Dilemma	Davis Coombe
2021
2021	Summer of Soul (...Or, When the Revolution Could Not Be Televised)	Joshua L. Pearson
2021	Flee	Janus Billeskov Jansen
2021	The Rescue	Bob Eisenhardt
2021	Val	Ting Poo and Leo Scott
2021	The Velvet Underground	Affonso Gonçalves and Adam Kurnitz
2022
2022	Fire of Love	Erin Casper and Jocelyne Chaput
2022	All the Beauty and the Bloodshed	Amy Foote, Joe Bini, and Brian A. Kates
2022	Good Night Oppy	Rejh Cabrera and Helen Kearns
2022	Moonage Daydream	Brett Morgen
2022	Navalny	Maya Hawke and Langdon Page
2023
2023	Still: A Michael J. Fox Movie	Michael Harte
2023	20 Days in Mariupol	Michelle Mizner
2023	American Symphony	Sammy Dane, Matthew Heineman, Jim Hession, and Fernando Villegas
2023	Joan Baez: I Am a Noise	Maeve O'Boyle
2023	Little Richard: I Am Everything	Nyneve Minnear and Jake Hostetter
2024
2024	Will & Harper	Monique Zavistovski
2024	Beatles '64	Mariah Rehmet
2024	Her Name Was Moviola	Howard Berry
2024	Jim Henson: Idea Man	Paul Crowder and Sierra Neal
2024	Super/Man: The Christopher Reeve Story	Otto Burnham
2025
2025	The Perfect Neighbor	Viridiana Lieberman
2025	Becoming Led Zeppelin	Dan Gitlin
2025	It's Never Over, Jeff Buckley	Brian A. Kates and Stacy Goldate
2025	John Candy: I Like Me	Shane Reid and Darrin Roberts
2025	Ladies & Gentlemen... 50 Years of SNL Music	James Lester and Oz Rodríguez
