= American Cinema Editors Award for Best Edited Feature Film – Comedy =

- Awarded for: Best Editing for a Comedy Feature Film
- Country: United States
- Presented by: American Cinema Editors (ACE)
- Currently held by: Andy Jurgensen – One Battle After Another (2025)
- Website: americancinemaeditors.org

The American Cinema Editors Award for Best Edited Feature Film – Comedy is one of the annual awards given by the American Cinema Editors, awarded to what members of the American Cinema Editors Guild deem as the best edited comedic film for a given year.

Along with the award for Best Edited Feature Film – Dramatic it was split off as Best Edited Feature Film – Comedy or Musical from the Best Edited Feature Film award in 2000. In 2021 this award was redesignated for comedy films, with musicals now permitted in both categories.

Animated films were permitted until 2009, when they were split off to Best Edited Animated Feature Film. This makes WALL-E the only winner for an animated film in the category.

== Winners and nominees ==
=== 1990s ===
Year	Film	Editor(s)
1999	Being John Malkovich	Eric Zumbrunnen
1999	Analyze This	Craig P. Herring and Christopher Tellefsen
1999	Election	Kevin Tent
1999	Man on the Moon	Adam Boome, Lynzee Klingman, and Christopher Tellefsen
1999	Run Lola Run	Mathilde Bonnefoy

=== 2000s ===
Year	Film	Editor(s)
2000	Almost Famous	Joe Hutshing and Saar Klein
2000	Best in Show	Robert Leighton
2000	Chocolat	Andrew Mondshein
2000	O Brother, Where Art Thou?	Roderick Jaynes
2000	Shanghai Noon	Richard Chew
2001	Moulin Rouge!	Jill Bilcock
2001	Amélie	Hervé Schneid
2001	Gosford Park	Tim Squyres
2001	Monsters, Inc.	Robert Grahamjones and Jim Stewart
2001	The Royal Tenenbaums	Dylan Tichenor
2001	Shrek	Sim Evan-Jones
2002	Chicago	Martin Walsh
2002	About a Boy	Nick Moore
2002	Adaptation	Eric Zumbrunnen
2002	My Big Fat Greek Wedding	Mia Goldman
2002	Punch-Drunk Love	Leslie Jones
2003	Pirates of the Caribbean: The Curse of the Black Pearl	Stephen E. Rivkin, Arthur Schmidt, and Craig Wood
2003	Bend It Like Beckham	Justin Krish
2003	Finding Nemo	David Ian Salter and Lee Unkrich
2003	Lost in Translation	Sarah Flack
2003	School of Rock	Sandra Adair
2004	Ray	Paul Hirsch
2004	De-Lovely	Julie Monroe
2004	Eternal Sunshine of the Spotless Mind	Valdís Óskarsdóttir
2004	The Incredibles	Stephen Schaffer
2004	Sideways	Kevin Tent
2005	Walk the Line	Michael McCusker
2005	Charlie and the Chocolate Factory	Chris Lebenzon
2005	The Family Stone	Jeffrey Ford
2005	Pride & Prejudice	Paul Tothill
2005	Wedding Crashers	Mark Livolsi
2006	Dreamgirls	Virginia Katz
2006	The Devil Wears Prada	Mark Livolsi
2006	Little Miss Sunshine	Pamela Martin
2006	Pirates of the Caribbean: Dead Man's Chest	Stephen E. Rivkin and Craig Wood
2006	Thank You for Smoking	Dana E. Glauberman
2007	Sweeney Todd: The Demon Barber of Fleet Street	Chris Lebenzon
2007	Hairspray	Michael Tronick
2007	Juno	Dana E. Glauberman
2007	Pirates of the Caribbean: At World's End	Stephen E. Rivkin and Craig Wood
2007	Ratatouille	Darren T. Holmes
2008	WALL-E	Stephen Schaffer
2008	In Bruges	Jon Gregory
2008	Mamma Mia!	Lesley Walker
2008	Tropic Thunder	Greg Hayden
2008	Vicky Cristina Barcelona	Alisa Lepselter
2009	The Hangover	Debra Neil-Fisher
2009	(500) Days of Summer	Alan Edward Bell
2009	It's Complicated	Joe Hutshing and David Moritz
2009	Julie & Julia	Richard Marks
2009	A Serious Man	Roderick Jaynes

=== 2010s ===
Year	Film	Editor(s)
2010	Alice in Wonderland	Chris Lebenzon
2010	Easy A	Susan Littenberg
2010	The Kids Are All Right	Jeffrey M. Werner
2010	Made in Dagenham	Michael Parker
2010	Scott Pilgrim vs. the World	Paul Machliss and Jonathan Amos
2011	The Artist	Anne-Sophie Bion and Michel Hazanavicius
2011	Bridesmaids	William Kerr and Michael L. Sale
2011	Midnight in Paris	Alisa Lepselter
2011	My Week with Marilyn	Adam Recht
2011	Young Adult	Dana E. Glauberman
2012	Silver Linings Playbook	Jay Cassidy and Crispin Struthers
2012	The Best Exotic Marigold Hotel	Chris Gill
2012	Les Misérables	Chris Dickens and Melanie Oliver
2012	Moonrise Kingdom	Andrew Weisblum
2012	Ted	Jeff Freeman
2013	American Hustle	Alan Baumgarten, Jay Cassidy, and Crispin Struthers
2013	August: Osage County	Stephen Mirrione
2013	Inside Llewyn Davis	Roderick Jaynes
2013	Nebraska	Kevin Tent
2013	The Wolf of Wall Street	Thelma Schoonmaker
2014	The Grand Budapest Hotel	Barney Pilling
2014	Birdman	Douglas Crise and Stephen Mirrione
2014	Guardians of the Galaxy	Fred Raskin, Hughes Winborne, and Craig Wood
2014	Into the Woods	Wyatt Smith
2014	Inherent Vice	Leslie Jones
2015	The Big Short	Hank Corwin
2015	Ant-Man	Dan Lebental and Colby Parker Jr.
2015	Joy	Alan Baumgarten, Jay Cassidy, Tom Cross, and Christopher Tellefsen
2015	Me and Earl and the Dying Girl	David Trachtenberg
2015	Trainwreck	William Kerr and Paul Zucke
2016	La La Land	Tom Cross
2016	Deadpool	Julian Clarke
2016	Hail, Caesar!	Roderick Jaynes
2016	The Jungle Book	Mark Livolsi
2016	The Lobster	Yorgos Mavropsaridis
2017	I, Tonya	Tatiana S. Riegel
2017	Baby Driver	Paul Machliss and Jonathan Amos
2017	Get Out	Gregory Plotkin
2017	Lady Bird	Nick Houy
2017	Three Billboards Outside Ebbing, Missouri	Jon Gregory
2018	The Favourite	Yorgos Mavropsaridis
2018	Crazy Rich Asians	Myron Kerstein
2018	Deadpool 2	Craig Alpert, Elísabet Ronaldsdóttir, and Dirk Westervelt
2018	Green Book	Patrick J. Don Vito
2018	Vice	Hank Corwin
2019	Jojo Rabbit	Tom Eagles
2019	Dolemite Is My Name	Billy Fox
2019	The Farewell	Michael Taylor and Matthew Friedman
2019	Knives Out	Bob Ducsay
2019	Once Upon a Time in Hollywood	Fred Raskin

=== 2020s ===
Year	Film	Editor(s)
2020	Palm Springs	Matthew Friedman and Andrew Dickler
2020	Borat Subsequent Moviefilm	James Thomas, Craig Alpert, and Mike Giambra
2020	I Care a Lot	Mark Eckersley
2020	On the Rocks	Sarah Flack
2020	Promising Young Woman	Frédéric Thoraval
2021	tick, tick... BOOM!	Myron Kerstein and Andrew Weisblum
2021	Cruella	Tatiana S. Riegel
2021	Don't Look Up	Hank Corwin
2021	The French Dispatch	Andrew Weisblum
2021	Licorice Pizza	Andy Jurgensen
2022	Everything Everywhere All At Once	Paul Rogers
2022	The Banshees of Inisherin	Mikkel E.G. Nielsen
2022	Glass Onion: A Knives Out Mystery	Bob Ducsay
2022	The Menu	Christopher Tellefsen
2022	Triangle of Sadness	Ruben Östlund and Mikel Cee Karlsson
2023	The Holdovers	Kevin Tent
2023	Air	William Goldenberg
2023	American Fiction	Hilda Rasula
2023	Barbie	Nick Houy
2023	Poor Things	Yorgos Mavropsaridis
2024	Wicked	Myron Kerstein
2024	Anora	Sean Baker
2024	Challengers	Marco Costa
2024	A Real Pain	Robert Nassau
2024	The Substance	Coralie Fargeat, Jérôme Eltabet and Valentin Féron
2025	One Battle After Another	Andy Jurgensen
2025	Bugonia	Yorgos Mavropsaridis
2025	Marty Supreme	Ronald Bronstein and Josh Safdie
2025	Wake Up Dead Man: A Knives Out Mystery	Bob Ducsay
2025	Wicked: For Good	Myron Kerstein

== See also ==
- American Cinema Editors Award for Best Edited Feature Film – Dramatic
- Academy Award for Best Film Editing
- BAFTA Award for Best Editing
- Critics' Choice Movie Award for Best Editing
- Independent Spirit Award for Best Editing
