= Myron Kerstein =

American film editor (born 1970)

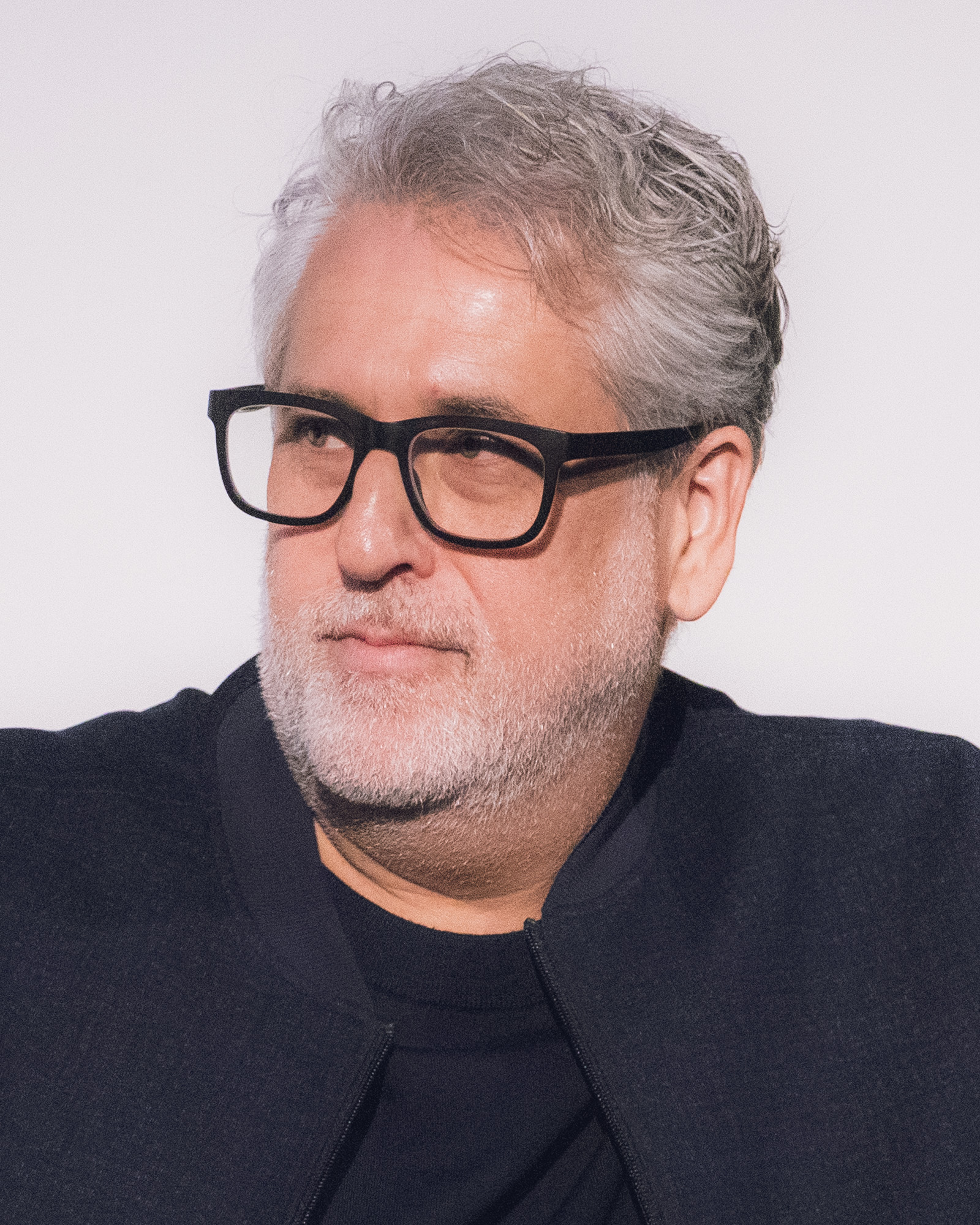
- Kerstein in 2025
- Born: August 15, 1970 (age 56); Oceanside, California, U.S.
- Occupation: Film editor

Myron I. Kerstein (born August 15, 1970) is an American film editor. He is perhaps best known for his collaborations with director Jon M. Chu on Wicked (2024), its sequel Wicked: For Good (2025), Crazy Rich Asians (2018) and In the Heights (2021).

He was nominated for two Academy Awards in the category Best Film Editing, in 2022 for the film Tick, Tick... Boom! alongside Andrew Weisblum, and in 2025 for Wicked. He is the recipient of two Eddie Awards in the category of Best Edited Feature Film (Comedy, Theatrical) for both of the aforementioned titles, and he also received a nomination in this category in 2019 for Crazy Rich Asians.

== Selected filmography ==
Editor
Year	Film	Director	Notes
1999	Black and White	James Toback	
2002	Love in the Time of Money	Peter Mattei	
2002	Raising Victor Vargas	Peter Sollett	First collaboration with Peter Sollett
2003	Camp	Todd Graff	
2004	Garden State	Zach Braff	First collaboration with Zach Braff
2004	Chrystal	Ray McKinnon	
2004	In Good Company	Paul Weitz	First collaboration with Paul Weitz
2005	The Dukes of Hazzard	Jay Chandrasekhar	
2006	American Dreamz	Paul Weitz	Second collaboration with Paul Weitz
2008	The Great Buck Howard	Sean McGinly	
2008	The Promotion	Steven Conrad	
2008	Nick & Norah's Infinite Playlist	Peter Sollett	Second collaboration with Peter Sollett
2009	Fame	Kevin Tancharoen	
2010	Little Fockers	Paul Weitz	Third collaboration with Paul Weitz
2012	LOL	Lisa Azuelos	
2013	Movie 43	Steven Brill	"iBabe" segment
2013	The English Teacher	Craig Zisk	
2013	Paradise	Diablo Cody	
2014	Wish I Was Here	Zach Braff	Second collaboration with Zach Braff
2017	Going in Style	Zach Braff	Third collaboration with Zach Braff
2018	Crazy Rich Asians	Jon M. Chu	First collaboration with Jon M. Chu
2021	In the Heights	Jon M. Chu	Second collaboration with Jon M. Chu
2021	Tick, Tick... Boom!	Lin-Manuel Miranda	
2024	Wicked	Jon M. Chu	Third collaboration with Jon M. Chu
2025	Wicked: For Good	Jon M. Chu	Fourth collaboration with Jon M. Chu
2027	The Nightingale	Michael Morris	

Editorial department
Year	Film	Director	Role
1997	Office Killer	Cindy Sherman	Assistant editor
1997	A Further Gesture	Robert Dornhelm	Assistant editor
1997	First Love, Last Rites	Jesse Peretz	Assistant editor
1998	Velvet Goldmine	Todd Haynes	Assistant editor
1998	Claire Dolan	Lodge Kerrigan	Additional assistant editor
1999	Spring Forward	Tom Gilroy	Assistant editor
2001	Hedwig and the Angry Inch	John Cameron Mitchell	Additional editor
2007	Chapter 27	Jarrett Schaefer	Additional editor
2010	Peep World	Barry W. Blaustein	Editorial consultant
2022	Spirited	Sean Anders	Additional editor

Additional crew
Year	Film	Director	Role
1997	The Myth of Fingerprints	Bart Freundlich	Film conform assistant
2003	Camp	Todd Graff	Title designer
2007	Eagle vs Shark	Taika Waititi	Creative consultant

Producer
Year	Film	Director	Credit
2015	The Adderall Diaries	Pamela Romanowsky	Co-producer
2017	The House of Tomorrow	Peter Livolsi	Associate producer

Production department
Year	Film	Director	Role
1996	The Daytrippers	Greg Mottola	Production assistant

Soundtrack
Year	Film	Director	Role
2008	Nick & Norah's Infinite Playlist	Peter Sollett	Writer: "Go Deep"

Thanks
Year	Film	Director	Role
1997	Eye of God	Tim Blake Nelson	Thanks
2006	Come Early Morning	Joey Lauren Adams	Special thanks
2006	Red Road	Andrea Arnold	Thanks
2010	Boy	Taika Waititi	The producers wish to thank for their support
2018	All About Nina	Eva Vives	Special thanks
2022	Crush	Sammi Cohen	Special thanks

Documentaries

Editor
Year	Film	Director	Notes
2011	Glee: The 3D Concert Movie	Kevin Tancharoen	Concert film

Editorial department
Year	Film	Director	Role
1997	Bye-Bye Babushka	Rebecca Dreyfus	Additional assistant editor

Shorts

Editor
Year	Film	Director
2004	Choices: The Good, the Bad, the Ugly	Tamara Jenkins
2016	Join the Club	Eva Vives

Additional crew
Year	Film	Director	Role
1995	Alkali, Iowa	Mark Christopher	Production assistant

TV documentaries

Editor
Year	Film	Director
2003	Hollywood High	Bruce Sinofsky

TV series

Editor
Year	Title	Notes
2000	Louis Theroux's Weird Weekends	1 episode
2012	Up All Night	1 episode
2013	House of Lies	4 episodes
2016	Divorce	1 episode
2015−17	Girls	16 episodes
2018	I Feel Bad	5 episodes
2019	Good Trouble	1 episode
2020	Home Before Dark	3 episodes

Editorial department
Year	Title	Role	Notes
1995	TV Nation	Assistant editor	1 episode
1998	Louis Theroux's Weird Weekends	Assistant editor	2 episodes
1998	Sex and the City	Assistant editor	10 episodes

Director
Year	Title	Notes
2021	Home Before Dark	1 episode

== Awards and nominations ==
Award	Year	Category	Nominated work	Result
Academy Awards	2022	Best Film Editing	Tick, Tick... Boom!	Nominated
Academy Awards	2025	Best Film Editing	Wicked	Nominated
Eddie Awards	2019	Best Edited Feature Film – Comedy or Musical	Crazy Rich Asians	Nominated
Eddie Awards	2022	Best Edited Feature Film – Comedy or Musical	Tick, Tick... Boom!	Won
Eddie Awards	2025	Best Edited Feature Film – Comedy or Musical	Wicked	Won
San Diego Film Critics Society Awards	2022	Best Editing	In the Heights	Won
Satellite Awards	2022	Best Editing	Tick, Tick... Boom!	Nominated
