= American Cinema Editors Award for Best Edited Half-Hour Series for Television =

Former annual US television award

- Awarded for: Best Edited Half-Hour Series for Television
- Country: United States
- Presented by: American Cinema Editors (ACE)
- Website: americancinemaeditors.org

The American Cinema Editors Award for Best Edited Half-Hour Series for Television is a former award, broadly awarding a variety of comedic shows. In 2018, the category dropped running time distinctions, as well as adding distinctions between viewing types (commercial television vs. non-commercial), and became Best Edited Comedy Series for Commercial Television and Best Edited Comedy Series for Non-Commercial Television respectively. In 2021, the comedy series categories were re-arranged into Best Edited Single-Camera Comedy Series and Best Edited Multi-Camera Comedy Series.

== Winners and nominees ==
- † – indicates the winner of a Primetime Emmy Award.
- ‡ – indicates a nomination for a Primetime Emmy Award.

=== 1990s ===
Year	Program	Episode(s)	Nominees	Network
1992
1992	Brooklyn Bridge	"Brave New World"	Roger Bondelli	CBS
1992	Coach	"Vows" ‡	Andrew Chulack	ABC
1992	Evening Shade	"The Really Odd Couple"	Tony Hayman	CBS
1992	Murphy Brown	"Send in the Clowns" ‡	Tucker Wiard	CBS
1992	The Wonder Years	"The Wedding"	Dennis C. Vejar	ABC
1993
1993	Tales from the Crypt	"People Who Live in Brass Hearses"	Stephen Lovejoy	HBO
1993	Murphy Brown	"Angst for the Memory"	Tucker Wiard	CBS
1993	Seinfeld	"The Lip Reader"	Janet Ashikaga	NBC
1994
1994	The Larry Sanders Show	"The Mr. Sharon Stone Show"	Paul Anderson and Leslie Dennis	HBO
1994	Seinfeld	"The Race"	Janet Ashikaga	NBC
1994	Wings	"Whose Wife Is It Anyway"	Darryl Bates	NBC
1995
1995	The Larry Sanders Show	"Eight"	Paul Anderson and Leslie Dennis	HBO
1995	Frasier	"The Adventures of Bad Boy and Dirty Girl" ‡	Timothy Mozer	NBC
1995	Seinfeld	"The Hot Tub"	Janet Ashikaga	NBC
1996
1996	Seinfeld	"The Abstinence"	Skip Collector	NBC
1996	3rd Rock from the Sun	"Dick Like Me"	Briana London	NBC
1996	The Larry Sanders Show	"Everybody Loves Larry" ‡	Sean Lambert and Leslie Tolan	HBO
1997
1997	Frasier	"Perspectives on Christmas"	Ron Volk	NBC
1997	Just Shoot Me!	"Lemon Wacky Hello"	Dennis C. Vejar	NBC
1997	Sabrina the Teenage Witch	"The Crucible"	Stuart Bass	ABC
1998
1998	Frasier	"Room Service" †	Ron Volk	NBC
1998	3rd Rock from the Sun	"Indecent Dick"	Vince Humphrey	NBC
1998	The Larry Sanders Show	"Flip" ‡	Paul Anderson, Sean Lambert and Leslie Tolan	HBO
1999
1999	Frasier	"Three Valentines"	Ron Volk	NBC
1999	Everybody Loves Raymond	"Robert's Date"	Patricia Barnett	CBS
1999	Sports Night	"Small Towns" †	Janet Ashikaga	ABC

=== 2000s ===
Year	Program	Episode(s)	Nominees	Network
2000
2000	Malcolm in the Middle	"Pilot"	Nancy Morrison	Fox
2000	Frasier	"Dark Side of the Moon" ‡	Ron Volk	NBC
2000	Sex and the City	"Running with Scissors"	Wendey Stanzler	HBO
2001
2001	Sex and the City	"The Real Me"	Michael Berenbaum	HBO
2001	Frasier	"Daphne Returns" †	Ron Volk	NBC
2001	Malcolm in the Middle	"Book Club"	Barry L. Gold	Fox
2002
2002	Sex and the City	"Luck Be an Old Lady" ‡	Wendey Stanzler	HBO
2002	Everybody Loves Raymond	"Marie's Sculpture"	Patricia Barnett	CBS
2002	Will & Grace	"A Chorus Lie" ‡	Peter Chakos	NBC
2003
2003	Will & Grace	"Last Ex to Brooklyn" ‡	Peter Chakos	NBC
2003	Frasier	"Rooms with a View" †	Ron Volk	NBC
2003	Sex and the City	"The Catch"	Michael Berenbaum and Wendey Stanzler	HBO
2004
2004	Sex and the City	"An American Girl In Paris (Part Deux)" ‡	Michael Berenbaum and Wendey Stanzler	HBO
2004	Arrested Development	"Let 'Em Eat Cake" ‡	Steven Sprung	Fox
2004	Will & Grace	"I Do, Oh, No, You Di-in't"	Peter Chakos	NBC
2005
2005	Arrested Development	"The Ocean Walker" ‡	Stuart Bass	Fox
2005	Curb Your Enthusiasm	"Kamikaze Bingo"	Steven Rasch	HBO
2005	My Name Is Earl	"Pilot"	Janet Ashikaga	NBC
2006
2006	The Office	"Casino Night"	Dean Holland and David Rogers	NBC
2006	Entourage	"Sorry, Ari"	Jon Corn	HBO
2006	My Name Is Earl	"Number One"	Lance Luckey	NBC
2007
2007	Curb Your Enthusiasm	"The Bat Mitzvah" ‡	Steven Rasch	HBO
2007	30 Rock	"The C Word"	Ken Eluto	NBC
2007	Californication	"Hell-A Woman"	Shannon Mitchell	Showtime
2008
2008	30 Rock	"Reunion"	Meg Reticker	NBC
2008	Entourage	"Play'n with Fire"	Jeff Groth	HBO
2008	The Office	"Goodbye, Toby" ‡	Dean Holland and David Rogers	NBC
2009
2009	30 Rock	"Apollo, Apollo" †	Ken Eluto	NBC
2009	Curb Your Enthusiasm	"The Bare Midriff" ‡	Steven Rasch	HBO
2009	Entourage	"The Sorkin Notes"	Steven Sprung	HBO

=== 2010s ===
Year	Program	Episode(s)	Nominees	Network
2010
2010	Modern Family	"Family Portrait" ‡	Jonathan Schwartz	ABC
2010	The Big C	"Pilot"	Brian A. Kates	Showtime
2010	Nurse Jackie	"Years of Service"	Anne McCabe	Showtime
2011
2011	Curb Your Enthusiasm	"Palestinian Chicken" †	Steven Rasch	HBO
2011	Modern Family	"Express Christmas"	Steven Rasch	ABC
2011	Curb Your Enthusiasm	"Mister Softee"	Roger Nygard	HBO
2012
2012	Nurse Jackie	"Handle Your Scandal"	Gary Levy	Showtime
2012	Girls	"Pilot"	Robert Frazen and Catherine Haight	HBO
2012	Modern Family	"Mistery Date"	Ryan Case	ABC
2013
2013	The Office	"Finale" †	David Rogers and Claire Scanlon	NBC
2013	30 Rock	"Hogcock!" / "Last Lunch" ‡	Ken Eluto and Meg Reticker	NBC
2013	Arrested Development	"Flight of the Phoenix" ‡	Kabir Akhtar and A.J. Dickerson	Netflix
2014
2014	Veep	"Special Relationship"	Anthony Boys	HBO
2014	Silicon Valley	"Optimal Tip-To-Tip Efficiency"	Brian Merken	HBO
2014	Transparent	"Pilot"	Catherine Haight	Amazon
2015
2015	Inside Amy Schumer	"12 Angry Men Inside Amy Schumer"	Nick Paley	Comedy Central
2015	Silicon Valley	"Two Days of the Condor" †	Brian Merken	HBO
2015	Veep	"Election Night"	Gary Dollner	HBO
2016
2016	Veep	"Morning After"	Steven Rasch	HBO
2016	Silicon Valley	"The Uptick" ‡	Brian Merken	HBO
2016	Veep	"Mother" ‡	Shawn Paper	HBO

== See also ==
- American Cinema Editors Award for Best Edited Drama Series
- American Cinema Editors Award for Best Edited Comedy Series for Commercial Television (2017–2020)
- American Cinema Editors Award for Best Edited Comedy Series for Non-Commercial Television (2017–2020)
- American Cinema Editors Award for Best Edited Single-Camera Comedy Series (2021–present)
- American Cinema Editors Award for Best Edited Multi-Camera Comedy Series (2021–present)
