= American Cinema Editors Awards 2019 =

69th ACE Eddie Awards
- Presented by: American Cinema Editors
- Date: February 1, 2019
- Site: The Beverly Hilton, Beverly Hills, California

Highlights
- Best Film: Drama: Bohemian Rhapsody
- Best Film: Comedy: The Favourite

The 69th American Cinema Editors Eddie Awards were presented on February 1, 2019 at The Beverly Hilton, honoring the best editors in film and television of 2018. The nominees were announced on January 7, 2019.

== Winners and nominees ==
Winners are listed first, highlighted in boldface.

=== Film ===
Best Edited Feature Film (Dramatic)

- **John Ottman – Bohemian Rhapsody**
  - Barry Alexander Brown – BlacKkKlansman
  - Tom Cross – First Man
  - Alfonso Cuarón and Adam Gough – Roma
  - Jay Cassidy – A Star Is Born

Best Edited Feature Film (Comedy)

- **Yorgos Mavropsaridis – The Favourite**
  - Myron Kerstein – Crazy Rich Asians
  - Craig Alpert, Elísabet Ronaldsdóttir, and Dirk Westervelt – Deadpool 2
  - Patrick J. Don Vito – Green Book
  - Hank Corwin – Vice

Best Edited Animated Feature Film

- **Robert Fisher Jr. – Spider-Man: Into the Spider-Verse**
  - Stephen Schaffer – Incredibles 2
  - Andrew Weisblum, Ralph Foster, and Edward Bursch – Isle of Dogs

Best Edited Documentary (Feature)

- **Bob Eisenhardt – Free Solo**
  - Carla Gutierrez – RBG
  - Michael Harte – Three Identical Strangers
  - Jeff Malmberg and Aaron Wickenden – Won't You Be My Neighbor?

Best Edited Documentary (Non-Theatrical)

- **Greg Finton and Poppy Das – Robin Williams: Come Inside My Mind**
  - Martin Singer – A Final Cut for Orson: 40 Years in the Making
  - Neil Meiklejohn – Wild Wild Country, Part 3
  - Joe Beshenkovsky – The Zen Diaries of Garry Shandling

=== Television ===
Best Edited Comedy Series for Commercial Television

- **Kyle Reiter – Atlanta ("Teddy Perkins")**
  - Isaac Hagy – Atlanta ("Alligator Man")
  - Eric Kissack – The Good Place ("Don't Let the Good Life Pass You By")
  - Jordan Kim, Ali Greer, Heather Capps, and Stacy Moon – Portlandia ("Rose Route")

Best Edited Comedy Series for Non-Commercial Television

- **Kate Sanford – The Marvelous Mrs. Maisel ("Simone")**
  - Jeff Buchanan – Barry ("Chapter One: Make Your Mark")
  - Nena Erb – Insecure ("Obsessed-Like")
  - Tim Streeto – The Marvelous Mrs. Maisel ("We're Going to the Catskills!")

Best Edited Drama Series for Commercial Television

- **Gary Dollner – Killing Eve ("Nice Face")**
  - Daniel Valverde – The Americans ("START")
  - Skip Macdonald – Better Call Saul ("Something Stupid")
  - Chris McCaleb – Better Call Saul ("Winner")

Best Edited Drama Series for Non-Commercial Television

- **Steve Singleton – Bodyguard ("Episode 1")**
  - Rosanne Tan – Homecoming ("Redwood")
  - Cindy Mollo and Heather Goodwin Floyd – Ozark ("One Way Out")
  - Andrew Seklir, Anna Hauger, and Mako Kamitsuna – Westworld ("The Passenger")

Best Edited Miniseries or Motion Picture for Television

- **Malcolm Jamieson and Geoffrey Richman – Escape at Dannemora ("Better Days")**
  - Emily Greene – The Assassination of Gianni Versace: American Crime Story ("A Random Killing")
  - Veronique Barbe, Dominique Champagne, Justin Lachance, Maxime Lahaie, Émile Vallée, and Jai M. Vee – Sharp Objects ("Milk")

Best Edited Non-Scripted Series

- **Hunter Gross – Anthony Bourdain: Parts Unknown ("West Virginia")**
  - Rob Butler – Deadliest Catch ("Storm Surge")
  - Molly Shock and Jnani Butler – Naked and Afraid ("Fire and Fury")
