= American Cinema Editors Award for Best Edited Comedy Series for Non-Commercial Television =

Former annual US television award

- Awarded for: Best Editing in a Comedy Series for Non-Commercial Television
- Country: United States
- Presented by: American Cinema Editors (ACE)
- Website: americancinemaeditors.org

The American Cinema Editors Award for Best Edited Multi-Camera Comedy Series is a former award given by the American Cinema Editors, awarded from 2018-2020. In 2021, the comedy series categories were re-arranged into American Cinema Editors Award for Best Edited Single-Camera Comedy Series and Best Edited Multi-Camera Comedy Series.

== Winners and nominees ==
- † – indicates the winner of a Primetime Emmy Award.
- ‡ – indicates a nomination for a Primetime Emmy Award.

=== 2010s ===
Year	Program	Episode(s)	Nominees	Network
2017
2017	Curb Your Enthusiasm	"The Shucker"	Joe Corn	HBO
2017	GLOW	"Pilot"	Bill Turro	Netflix
2017	Veep	"Chicklet" ‡	Roger Nygard and Gennady Fridman	Netflix
2017	Curb Your Enthusiasm	"Fatwa!"	Steven Rasch	HBO
2018
2018	The Marvelous Mrs. Maisel	"Simone"	Kate Sanford	Amazon
2018	Barry	"Chapter One: Make Your Mark"	Jeff Buchanan	HBO
2018	Insecure	"Obsessed-Like"	Nena Erb	HBO
2018	The Marvelous Mrs. Maisel	"We're Going to the Catskills!"	Tim Streeto	Amazon
2019
2019	Fleabag	"Episode 1"	Gary Dollner	Amazon
2019	Barry	"berkman > block"	Kyle Reiter	HBO
2019	Dead to Me	"Pilot"	Liza Cardinale	Netflix
2019	Russian Doll	"The Way Out"	Todd Downing	Netflix

=== 2020s ===
Year	Program	Episode(s)	Nominees	Network
2020
2020	Ted Lasso	"Make Rebecca Great Again"	Melissa McCoy	Apple TV+
2020	Curb Your Enthusiasm	"Happy New Year"	Tim Roche	HBO
2020	Insecure	"Lowkey Trying"	Nena Erb	HBO
2020	Ted Lasso	"The Hope That Kills You"	A.J. Catoline	Apple TV+

== See also ==
- American Cinema Editors Award for Best Edited Comedy Series for Commercial Television (2017–2020)
- American Cinema Editors Award for Best Edited Drama Series
- American Cinema Editors Award for Best Edited Half-Hour Series for Television (1992–2016)
- American Cinema Editors Award for Best Edited Single-Camera Comedy Series (2021–present)
- American Cinema Editors Award for Best Edited Multi-Camera Comedy Series (2021–present)
