= American Cinema Editors Award for Best Edited Comedy Series for Commercial Television =

Former annual US television award

- Awarded for: Best Edited Comedy Series for Commercial Television
- Country: United States
- Presented by: American Cinema Editors (ACE)
- Website: americancinemaeditors.org

The American Cinema Editors Award for Best Edited Comedy Series for Commercial Television is a former award given by the American Cinema Editors. In 2018, it was split from Best Edited Half-Hour Series for Television alongside Best Edited Comedy Series for Commercial Television.

== Winners and Nominees ==
=== 2010s ===
Year	Program	Episode(s)	Nominees	Network
2017
2017	Black-ish	"Lemons"	John Peter Bernardo and Jamie Pedroza	ABC
2017	Crazy Ex-Girlfriend	"Josh's Ex-Girlfriend Wants Revenge."	Kabir Akhtar and Kyla Plewes	The CW
2017	Portlandia	"Amore"	Heather Capps, Ali Greer and Jordan Kim	IFC
2017	Will & Grace	"Grandpa Jack" †	Peter D. Beyt	NBC
2018
2018	Atlanta	"Teddy Perkins" ‡	Kyle Reiter	FX
2018	Portlandia	"Rose Route"	Heather Capps, Ali Greer, Jordan Kim and Stacy Moon	IFC
2018	Atlanta	"Alligator Man" ‡	Isaac Hagy	FX
2018	The Good Place	"Don't Let the Good Life Pass You By"	Eric Kissack	NBC
2019
2019	Better Things	"Easter"	Janet Weinberg	FX
2019	Crazy Ex-Girlfriend	"I Need to Find My Frenemy"	Nena Erb	The CW
2019	The Good Place	"Pandemonium"	Eric Kissack	NBC
2019	Schitt's Creek	"Life Is a Cabaret"	Trevor Ambrose	Pop

=== 2020s ===
Year	Program	Episode(s)	Nominees	Network
2020
2020	Schitt's Creek	"Happy Ending"	Trevor Ambrose	Pop
2020	The Good Place	"Whenever You're Ready"	Eric Kissack	NBC
2020	What We Do in the Shadows	"On the Run"	Dane McMaster, Varun Viswanath	FX
2020	What We Do in the Shadows	"Resurrection"	Yana Gorskaya, Dane McMaster	FX

== See also ==
- American Cinema Editors Award for Best Edited Comedy Series for Non-Commercial Television (2017–2020)
- American Cinema Editors Award for Best Edited Drama Series
- American Cinema Editors Award for Best Edited Half-Hour Series for Television (1992–2016)
- American Cinema Editors Award for Best Edited Single-Camera Comedy Series (2021–present)
- American Cinema Editors Award for Best Edited Multi-Camera Comedy Series (2021–present)
