= American Cinema Editors Awards 2021 =

Award ceremony for editing of 2019, 2020 and 2021

71st ACE Eddie Awards
- Presented by: American Cinema Editors
- Date: April 17, 2021
- Site: Virtual ceremony

Highlights
- Best Film: Drama: The Trial of the Chicago 7
- Best Film: Comedy: Palm Springs

The 71st American Cinema Editors Eddie Awards were presented on April 17, 2021, virtually, honoring the best editors in film and television of the previous year. The nominees were announced on March 11, 2021.

Lynzee Klingman and Sidney Wolinsky both received the Career Achievement Award for their "outstanding contributions to film editing" while filmmaker Spike Lee was honored with the ACE Golden Eddie Filmmaker of the Year Award "in recognition of his distinguished achievement in the art and business of film".

To coordinate scheduling with the Academy Awards, the eligibility periods were changed from the standard calendar year: television was eligible if it broadcast between November 2, 2019 and December 31, 2020; and feature films were eligible if released between January 1, 2020 and February 28, 2021.

== Winners and nominees ==
Winners are listed first, highlighted in boldface

=== Film ===
Best Edited Feature Film (Drama)

- **Alan Baumgarten – The Trial of the Chicago 7**
  - Kirk Baxter – Mank
  - Harry Yoon – Minari
  - Chloé Zhao – Nomadland
  - Mikkel E. G. Nielsen – Sound of Metal

Best Edited Feature Film (Comedy)

- **Matthew Friedman and Andrew Dickler – Palm Springs**
  - James Thomas, Craig Alpert, and Mike Giambra – Borat Subsequent Moviefilm
  - Mark Eckersley – I Care a Lot
  - Sarah Flack – On the Rocks
  - Frédéric Thoraval – Promising Young Woman

Best Edited Animated Feature Film

- **Kevin Nolting – Soul**
  - James Ryan – The Croods: A New Age
  - Catherine Apple – Onward
  - Edie Ichioka – Over the Moon
  - Darragh Byrne, Richie Cody, and Darren Holmes – Wolfwalkers

Best Edited Documentary (Feature)

- **Pippa Ehrlich and Dan Schwalm – My Octopus Teacher**
  - Nancy Novack – All In: The Fight for Democracy
  - Nels Bangerter – Dick Johnson Is Dead
  - Scott D. Hanson, James Leche, Wyatt Rogowski, and Avner Shiloah – The Dissident
  - Davis Coombe – The Social Dilemma

Best Edited Documentary (Non-Theatrical)

- **Chad Beck, Devin Concannon, Abhay Sofsky, and Ben Sozanski – The Last Dance (Episode: "Episode I")**
  - Jeff Buchanan and Zoe Schack – Beastie Boys Story
  - Derek Boonstra and Robert A. Martinez – The Bee Gees: How Can You Mend a Broken Heart
  - Inbal B. Lessner, Alex Jablonski, Gillian McCarthy, Matthew Moul, and Chris A. Peterson – Seduced: Inside the NXIVM Cult (Episode: "Exposed")

=== Television ===
Best Edited Comedy Series for Commercial Television

- **Trevor Ambrose – Schitt's Creek (Episode: "Happy Ending")**
  - Eric Kissack – The Good Place (Episode: "Whenever You're Ready")
  - Dane McMaster and Varun Viswanath – What We Do in the Shadows (Episode: "On the Run")
  - Yana Gorskaya and Dane McMaster – What We Do in the Shadows (Episode: "Resurrection")

Best Edited Comedy Series for Non-Commercial Television

- **Melissa McCoy – Ted Lasso (Episode: "Make Rebecca Great Again")**
  - Tim Roche – Curb Your Enthusiasm (Episode: "Happy New Year")
  - Nena Erb – Insecure (Episode: "Lowkey Trying")
  - A.J. Catoline – Ted Lasso (Episode: "The Hope That Kills You")

Best Edited Drama Series for Commercial Television

- **Joey Liew and Chris McCaleb – Better Call Saul (Episode: "Bad Choice Road")**
  - Dan Crinnion – Killing Eve (Episode: "Still Got It")
  - Rosanne Tan – Mr. Robot (Episode: "405 Method Not Allowed")
  - Julia Grove and Lai-San Ho – This Is Us (Episode: "Forty: Part Two")

Best Edited Drama Series for Non-Commercial Television

- **Cindy Mollo – Ozark (Episode: "Wartime")**
  - Steven Cohen – Bosch (Episode: "The Ace Hotel")
  - Julio C. Perez IV – Euphoria (Episode: "Trouble Don't Last Always")
  - Dana E. Glauberman – The Mandalorian (Episode: "Chapter 4: Sanctuary")

Best Edited Miniseries or Motion Picture for Television

- **Michelle Tesoro – The Queen's Gambit (Episode: "Exchanges")**
  - Jonah Moran – Hamilton
  - Robert Komatsu – Mrs. America (Episode: "Phyllis")
  - Anna Hauger – Watchmen (Episode: "This Extraordinary Being")

Best Edited Non-Scripted Series

- **Kate Hackett, Daniel McDonald, Mark Morgan, Sharon Weaver, and Ted Woerner – Cheer (Episode: God Blessed Texas")**
  - Barry Blaschke, Michelle Brundige, Charles Divak, Jane Jo, Benji Kast, Stefanie Maridueña, Seth Skundrick, and Evan Wise – The Circus: Inside the Greatest Political Show on Earth (Episode: "Who the F*** Are We?")
  - Rob Butler, Isaiah Camp, Joe Mikan, Art O'Leary, Ian Olsen, and Josh Stockero – Deadliest Catch (Episode: "Mayday Mayday")
  - Adam Locke-Norton – How To with John Wilson (Episode: "How To Cook the Perfect Risotto")

Best Edited Variety Talk/Sketch Show or Special

- **Adam Gough – David Byrne's American Utopia**
  - Steven Bognar – 8:46
  - Jon Alloway, Chester G. Contaoi, Brian Forbes, Brad Gilson, and Pi Ware – Dave Chappelle: The Kennedy Center Mark Twain Prize for American Humor
  - Paul Del Gesso, Yanni Feder, Daniel Garcia, Jack Klink, Richard Lampasone, Ryan McIlraith, Sean McIlraith, Steven Pierce, Christopher Salerno, Devon Schwab, Ryan Spears, and Jason Watkins – Saturday Night Live (Episode: "Tom Hanks")

Best Edited Animation (Non-Theatrical)

- **Lee Harting – Rick and Morty (Episode: "Rattlestar Ricklactica")**
  - Felipe Salazar – Big Mouth (Episode: "Nick Starr")
  - Jeremy Reuben – Bob's Burgers (Episode: "Bob Belcher and the Terrible, Horrible, No Good, Very Bad Kids")
  - Brian Swanson – BoJack Horseman (Episode: "Nice While It Lasted")
