= American Cinema Editors Awards 2020 =

70th ACE Eddie Awards
- Presented by: American Cinema Editors
- Date: January 17, 2020
- Site: The Beverly Hilton, Beverly Hills, California

Highlights
- Best Film: Drama: Parasite
- Best Film: Comedy: Jojo Rabbit

The 70th American Cinema Editors Eddie Awards were presented on January 17, 2020, at The Beverly Hilton, honoring the best editors in film and television of 2019. The nominees were announced on December 11, 2019.

Lauren Shuler Donner received ACE's Golden Eddie Award, and film editors Alan Heim and Tina Hirsch both received the Career Achievement Award. Cathy Repola, National Executive Director of the Motion Picture Editors Guild, was honored with ACE's Heritage Award, which recognizes an "individual's commitment to advancing the image of the film editor, cultivating respect for the editing profession, and dedication to ACE".

== Winners and nominees ==
Winners are listed first, highlighted in boldface

=== Film ===
Best Edited Feature Film (Drama)

- **Yang Jin-mo – Parasite**
  - Michael McCusker and Andrew Buckland – Ford v Ferrari
  - Thelma Schoonmaker – The Irishman
  - Jeff Groth – Joker
  - Jennifer Lame – Marriage Story

Best Edited Feature Film (Comedy)

- **Tom Eagles – Jojo Rabbit**
  - Billy Fox – Dolemite Is My Name
  - Michael Taylor and Matthew Friedman – The Farewell
  - Bob Ducsay – Knives Out
  - Fred Raskin – Once Upon a Time in Hollywood

Best Edited Animated Feature Film

- **Axel Geddes – Toy Story 4**
  - Jeff Draheim – Frozen 2
  - Benjamin Massoubre – I Lost My Body

Best Edited Documentary (Feature)

- **Todd Douglas Miller – Apollo 11**
  - Lindsay Utz – American Factory
  - Jake Pushinsky and Heidi Scharfe – Linda Ronstadt: The Sound of My Voice
  - David J. Turner and Thomas G. Miller – Making Waves: The Art of Cinematic Sound

Best Edited Documentary (Non-Theatrical)

- **Jake Pushinsky – What's My Name: Muhammad Ali**
  - James Cude – Abducted in Plain Sight
  - Dava Whisenant – Bathtubs Over Broadway
  - Jules Cornell – Leaving Neverland

=== Television ===
Best Edited Comedy Series for Commercial Television

- **Janet Weinberg – Better Things (Episode: "Easter")**
  - Nena Erb – Crazy Ex-Girlfriend (Episode: "I Need to Find My Frenemy")
  - Eric Kissack – The Good Place (Episode: "Pandemonium")
  - Trevor Ambrose – Schitt's Creek (Episode: "Life Is a Cabaret")

Best Edited Comedy Series for Non-Commercial Television

- **Gary Dollner – Fleabag (Episode: "2.1")**
  - Kyle Reiter – Barry (Episode: "berkman ﹥ block")
  - Liza Cardinale – Dead to Me (Episode: "Pilot")
  - Todd Downing – Russian Doll (Episode: "The Way Out")

Best Edited Drama Series for Commercial Television

- **Dan Crinnion – Killing Eve (Episode: "Desperate Times")**
  - David J. Siegel – Chicago Med (Episode: "Never Going Back to Normal")
  - Al Morrow – Killing Eve (Episode: "Smell Ya Later")
  - Rosanne Tan – Mr. Robot (Episode: "401 Unauthorized")

Best Edited Drama Series for Non-Commercial Television

- **Tim Porter – Game of Thrones (Episode: "The Long Night")**
  - Julio C. Perez IV – Euphoria (Episode: "Pilot")
  - Kirk Baxter – Mindhunter (Episode: "Episode 2")
  - David Eisenberg – Watchmen (Episode: "It's Summer and We're Running Out of Ice")

Best Edited Miniseries or Motion Picture for Television

- **Jinx Godfrey and Simon Smith – Chernobyl (Episode: "Vichnaya Pamyat")**
  - Tim Streeto – Fosse/Verdon (Episode: "Life Is a Cabaret")
  - Terilyn A. Shropshire – When They See Us (Episode: "Part 1")

Best Edited Non-Scripted Series

- **Cameron Dennis, Kelly Kendrick, Joe Matoske, and Ryo Ikegami – VICE Investigates (Episode: "Amazon on Fire")**
  - Ben Bulatao, Rob Butler, Isaiah Camp, Greg Cornejo, and Joe Mikan – Deadliest Catch (Episode: "Triple Jeopardy")
  - Stephanie Neroes, Sam Citron, LaRonda Morris, Rachel Cushing, Justin Goll, Masayoshi Matsuda, and Kyle Schadt – Surviving R. Kelly (Episode: "All the Missing Girls")
