= American Cinema Editors Award for Best Edited Multi-Camera Comedy Series =

Annual US television award

- Awarded for: Best Edited Multi-Camera Comedy Series
- Country: United States
- Presented by: American Cinema Editors (ACE)
- Currently held by: Russell Griffin – Frasier (2025)
- Website: americancinemaeditors.org

The American Cinema Editors Award for Best Edited Multi-Camera Comedy Series is one of the annual awards given by the American Cinema Editors. It was created in 2021, when the comedy series categories were re-arranged into Best Edited Single-Camera Comedy Series and Best Edited Multi-Camera Comedy Series.

== Winners and nominations ==
=== 2020s ===
Year	Program	Episode(s)	Nominees	Network
2021
2021	Kevin Can F**k Himself	"Live Free or Die"	Daniel Schalk	AMC
2021	Kevin Can F**k Himself	"Fixed"	Kenneth LaMere	AMC
2021	Kevin Can F**k Himself	"The Grand Victorian"	Ivan Victor	AMC
2022
2022	The Neighborhood	"Welcome to the Art of Negotiation"	Chris Poulos	CBS
2022	The Conners	"Of Missing Minds and Missing Fries"	Brain Schnuckel	ABC
2022	How I Met Your Father	"Timing is Everything"	Sue Federman	Hulu
2023
2023	How I Met Your Father	"Daddy"	Russell Griffin	Hulu
2023	Frasier	"Blind Date"	Joseph Fulton	Paramount+
2023	The Upshaws	"Off Beat"	Angel Gamboa Bryant	Netflix
2024
2024	Frasier	"My Brilliant Sister"	Russell Griffin	Paramount+
2024	Poppa's House	"Sleepover"	Angel Gamboa Bryant	CBS
2024	The Upshaws	"Do I?"	Angel Gamboa Bryant and Brian LeCoz	Netflix
2025
2025	Frasier	"Murder More Finch"	Russell Griffin	Paramount+
2025	Mid-Century Modern	"Love Thy Neighbor"	Peter Chakos	Hulu
2025	The Upshaws	"Tee'd Up"	Angel Gamboa Bryant	Netflix

== Statistics ==
=== Programs with multiple awards ===
2 awards

- Frasier

=== Editors with multiple awards ===
2 awards

- Russell Griffin

=== Programs with multiple nominations ===
3 nominations

- Frasier
- Kevin Can F**k Himself
- The Upshaws

2 nominations

- How I Met Your Father

=== Editors with multiple nominations ===
4 nominations

- Angel Gamboa Bryant

3 nominations

- Russell Griffin

=== Networks with multiple nominations ===
3 nominations

- AMC
- Hulu
- Netflix
- Paramount+

2 nominations

- CBS

== See also ==
- American Cinema Editors Award for Best Edited Drama Series
- American Cinema Editors Award for Best Edited Half-Hour Series for Television (1992–2016)
- American Cinema Editors Award for Best Edited Comedy Series for Commercial Television (2017–2020)
- American Cinema Editors Award for Best Edited Comedy Series for Non-Commercial Television (2017–2020)
