= Joanna Naugle =

American film editor

Joanna Naugle (b. c. 1990) is an American film editor. She has been nominated four times for American Cinema Editors Award for Best Edited Single-Camera Comedy Series for the television program The Bear and has won twice. She has six Emmy Award nominations for editing. She has won two Primetime Emmy Award for Outstanding Picture Editing for a Single-Camera Comedy Series Emmy Awards, for the "System" and "Fishes" episodes. She also has won two British Film Editors Cut Above awards.

== Biography ==
Naugle grew up in Scotch Plains, New Jersey, and went to college at New York University's Tisch School of the Arts. Naugle started working with Josh Senior in 2012. She is a partner in the post-production company Senior Post.

Past editing projects have included the TV series Ramy, Big Mouth and spinoff Human Resources, the podcast 2 Dope Queens, and John Krasinski's YouTube series Some Good News. She has edited stand-up specials for Roy Wood Jr., Phoebe Robinson, Chris Gethard, John Mulaney, and Ramy Youssef, including the standup specials John Mulaney & the Sack Lunch Bunch and Ramy Youssef: Feelings. She has edited independent films that screened at Sundance, Slamdance, and South by Southwest, and commercials for Coca-Cola, Reebok, YouTube, Sephora, Vevo, Atlas Obscura, and Vice.
