= American Cinema Editors Award for Best Edited Single-Camera Comedy Series =

Annual US television award

- Awarded for: Best Edited Single-Camera Comedy Series
- Country: United States
- Presented by: American Cinema Editors (ACE)
- Currently held by: Liza Cardinale and Dane McMaster – What We Do in the Shadows (2024)
- Website: americancinemaeditors.org

The American Cinema Editors Award for Best Edited Single-Camera Comedy Series is one of the annual awards given by the American Cinema Editors. It was created in 2021, when the comedy series categories were re-arranged into Best Edited Single-Camera Comedy Series and Best Edited Multi-Camera Comedy Series.

== Winners and nominees ==
- † – indicates the winner of a Primetime Emmy Award.
- ‡ – indicates a nomination for a Primetime Emmy Award.

=== 2020s ===
| Year | Program | Episode(s) | Nominees | Network |
|---|---|---|---|---|
2021
| 2021 | Hacks | "1.69 Million" | Susan Vaill | HBO Max |
| 2021 | Curb Your Enthusiasm | "Igor, Gregor, & Timor" | Steven Rasch and Thomas Foligno | HBO |
| 2021 | Curb Your Enthusiasm | "The Mormon Advantage" | Chris Chandler and Roger Nygard | HBO |
| 2021 | Ted Lasso | "No Weddings and a Funeral" | A.J. Catoline | Apple TV+ |
| 2021 | Ted Lasso | "Rainbow" | Melissa McCoy | Apple TV+ |
2022
| 2022 | The Bear | "System" | Joanna Naugle | FX |
| 2022 | Atlanta | "Andrew Wyeth. Alfred's World." | Kyle Reiter and Isaac Hagy | FX |
| 2022 | Barry | "710N" | Franky Guttman | HBO |
| 2022 | Barry | "starting now" | Ali Greer | HBO |
| 2022 | Only Murders in the Building | "I Know Who Did It" | Shelly Westerman and Payton Koch | Hulu |
2023
| 2023 | The Bear | "Fishes" | Joanna Naugle | FX |
| 2023 | Barry | "wow" | Ali Greer and Franky Guttman | HBO |
| 2023 | The Bear | "Forks" | Adam Epstein | FX |
| 2023 | Only Murders in the Building | "Sitzprobe" | Shelly Westerman and Payton Koch | Hulu |
| 2023 | Ted Lasso | "So Long, Farewell" | Melissa McCoy | Apple TV+ |
2024
| 2024 | What We Do in the Shadows | "Sleep Hypnosis" | Liza Cardinale and Dane McMaster | FX |
| 2024 | The Bear | "Tomorrow" | Joanna Naugle | FX |
| 2024 | Curb Your Enthusiasm | "The Gettysburg" | Steven Rasch | HBO |
| 2024 | Nobody Wants This | "Pliot" | Maura Corey | Netflix |
| 2024 | Only Murders in the Building | "My Best Friend's Wedding" | Shelly Westerman and Payton Koch | Hulu |
2025
| 2025 | The Studio | "The Promotion" | Eric Kissack | Apple TV |
| 2025 | The Bear | "Bears" | Joanna Naugle | FX on Hulu |
| 2025 | The Chair Company | "Life Goes By Too F**king Fast, It Really Does" | Stacy Moon | HBO |
| 2025 | Hacks | "I Love L.A." | Susan Vaill | HBO Max |
| 2025 | Only Murders in the Building | "The House Always..." | Shelly Westerman | Hulu |

== See also ==
- American Cinema Editors Award for Best Edited Drama Series
- American Cinema Editors Award for Best Edited Half-Hour Series for Television (1992–2016)
- American Cinema Editors Award for Best Edited Comedy Series for Commercial Television (2017–2020)
- American Cinema Editors Award for Best Edited Comedy Series for Non-Commercial Television (2017–2020)
