= American Cinema Editors Award for Best Edited Feature Film – Dramatic =

Annual US film award

- Awarded for: Best Editing for a Dramatic Feature Film
- Country: United States
- Presented by: American Cinema Editors (ACE)
- Currently held by: Michael Shawver – Sinners (2025)
- Website: americancinemaeditors.org

The American Cinema Editors Award for Best Edited Feature Film – Dramatic is one of the annual awards given by the American Cinema Editors, awarded to what members of the American Cinema Editors Guild deem as the best edited dramatic film for a given year. It was split from American Cinema Editors Award for Best Edited Feature Film in 2000.

== Winners and nominees ==
=== 1990s ===
Year	Film	Editor(s)
1999	The Matrix	Zach Staenberg
1999	American Beauty	Tariq Anwar and Christopher Greenbury
1999	The Insider	William Goldenberg, Paul Rubell, and David Rosenbloom
1999	The Sixth Sense	Andrew Mondshein
1999	The Talented Mr. Ripley	Walter Murch

=== 2000s ===
Year	Film	Editor(s)
2000	Gladiator	Pietro Scalia
2000	Billy Elliot	John Wilson
2000	Cast Away	Arthur Schmidt
2000	Crouching Tiger, Hidden Dragon	Tim Squyres
2000	Traffic	Stephen Mirrione
2001	Black Hawk Down	Pietro Scalia
2001	A Beautiful Mind	Daniel P. Hanley and Mike Hill
2001	Harry Potter and the Sorcerer's Stone	Richard Francis-Bruce
2001	The Lord of the Rings: The Fellowship of the Ring	John Gilbert
2001	Memento	Dody Dorn
2002	Gangs of New York	Thelma Schoonmaker
2002	About Schmidt	Kevin Tent
2002	The Hours	Peter Boyle
2002	The Lord of the Rings: The Two Towers	Michael J. Horton
2002	Minority Report	Michael Kahn
2003	The Lord of the Rings: The Return of the King	Jamie Selkirk
2003	Cold Mountain	Walter Murch
2003	Master and Commander: The Far Side of the World	Lee Smith
2003	Mystic River	Joel Cox
2003	Seabiscuit	William Goldenberg
2004	The Aviator	Thelma Schoonmaker
2004	Collateral	Jim Miller and Paul Rubell
2004	Finding Neverland	Matt Chesse
2004	Kill Bill: Volume 2	Sally Menke
2004	Kinsey	Virginia Katz
2004	Million Dollar Baby	Joel Cox
2005	Crash	Hughes Winborne
2005	Brokeback Mountain	Geraldine Peroni and Dylan Tichenor
2005	The Constant Gardener	Claire Simpson
2005	Good Night, and Good Luck	Stephen Mirrione
2005	Munich	Michael Kahn
2006	Babel (TIE)	Douglas Crise and Stephen Mirrione
2006	The Departed (TIE)	Thelma Schoonmaker
2006	Casino Royale	Stuart Baird
2006	The Queen	Lucia Zucchetti
2006	United 93	Clare Douglas, Richard Pearson, and Christopher Rouse
2007	The Bourne Ultimatum	Christopher Rouse
2007	Into the Wild	Jay Cassidy
2007	Michael Clayton	John Gilroy
2007	No Country for Old Men	Roderick Jaynes
2007	There Will Be Blood	Dylan Tichenor
2008	Slumdog Millionaire	Chris Dickens
2008	The Curious Case of Benjamin Button	Kirk Baxter and Angus Wall
2008	The Dark Knight	Lee Smith
2008	Frost/Nixon	Daniel P. Hanley and Mike Hill
2008	Milk	Elliot Graham
2009	The Hurt Locker	Chris Innis and Bob Murawski
2009	Avatar	James Cameron, John Refoua, and Stephen E. Rivkin
2009	District 9	Julian Clarke
2009	Star Trek	Maryann Brandon and Mary Jo Markey
2009	Up in the Air	Dana E. Glauberman

=== 2010s ===
Year	Film	Editor(s)
2010	The Social Network	Kirk Baxter and Angus Wall
2010	Black Swan	Andrew Weisblum
2010	The Fighter	Pamela Martin
2010	Inception	Lee Smith
2010	The King's Speech	Tariq Anwar
2011	The Descendants	Kevin Tent
2011	The Girl with the Dragon Tattoo	Kirk Baxter and Angus Wall
2011	Hugo	Thelma Schoonmaker
2011	Moneyball	Christopher Tellefsen
2011	War Horse	Michael Kahn
2012	Argo	William Goldenberg
2012	Life of Pi	Tim Squyres
2012	Lincoln	Michael Kahn
2012	Skyfall	Stuart Baird
2012	Zero Dark Thirty	Dylan Tichenor and William Goldenberg
2013	Captain Phillips	Christopher Rouse
2013	12 Years a Slave	Joe Walker
2013	Gravity	Alfonso Cuarón and Mark Sanger
2013	Her	Jeff Buchanan and Eric Zumbrunnen
2013	Saving Mr. Banks	Mark Livolsi
2014	Boyhood	Sandra Adair
2014	American Sniper	Joel Cox and Gary Roach
2014	Gone Girl	Kirk Baxter
2014	The Imitation Game	William Goldenberg
2014	Nightcrawler	John Gilroy
2014	Whiplash	Tom Cross
2015	Mad Max: Fury Road	Margaret Sixel
2015	The Martian	Pietro Scalia
2015	The Revenant	Stephen Mirrione
2015	Sicario	Joe Walker
2015	Star Wars: The Force Awakens	Maryann Brandon and Mary Jo Markey
2016	Arrival	Joe Walker
2016	Hacksaw Ridge	John Gilbert
2016	Hell or High Water	Jake Roberts
2016	Manchester by the Sea	Jennifer Lame
2016	Moonlight	Nat Sanders and Joi McMillon
2017	Dunkirk	Lee Smith
2017	Blade Runner 2049	Joe Walker
2017	Molly's Game	Alan Baumgarten, Josh Schaeffer, and Elliot Graham
2017	The Post	Michael Kahn and Sarah Broshar
2017	The Shape of Water	Sidney Wolinsky
2018	Bohemian Rhapsody	John Ottman
2018	BlacKkKlansman	Barry Alexander Brown
2018	First Man	Tom Cross
2018	Roma	Alfonso Cuarón and Adam Gough
2018	A Star Is Born	Jay Cassidy
2019	Parasite	Yang Jin-mo
2019	Ford v Ferrari	Andrew Buckland and Michael McCusker
2019	The Irishman	Thelma Schoonmaker
2019	Joker	Jeff Groth
2019	Marriage Story	Jennifer Lame

=== 2020s ===
Year	Film	Editor(s)
2020	The Trial of the Chicago 7	Alan Baumgarten
2020	Mank	Kirk Baxter
2020	Minari	Harry Yoon
2020	Nomadland	Chloé Zhao
2020	Sound of Metal	Mikkel E. G. Nielsen
2021	King Richard	Pamela Martin
2021	Belfast	Úna Ní Dhonghaíle
2021	Dune	Joe Walker
2021	No Time to Die	Elliot Graham and Tom Cross
2021	The Power of the Dog	Peter Sciberras
2022	Top Gun: Maverick	Eddie Hamilton
2022	All Quiet on the Western Front	Sven Budelmann
2022	Elvis	Matt Villa and Jonathan Redmond
2022	Tár	Monika Willi
2022	The Woman King	Terilyn A. Shropshire
2023	Oppenheimer	Jennifer Lame
2023	Anatomy of a Fall	Laurent Sénéchal
2023	Killers of the Flower Moon	Thelma Schoonmaker
2023	Maestro	Michelle Tesoro
2023	Past Lives	Keith Fraase
2024	Emilia Pérez	Juliette Welfling
2024	Civil War	Jake Roberts
2024	Conclave	Nick Emerson
2024	Dune: Part Two	Joe Walker
2024	Furiosa: A Mad Max Saga	Eliot Knapman and Margaret Sixel
2025	Sinners	Michael Shawver
2025	F1	Stephen Mirrione
2025	Hamnet	Chloé Zhao and Affonso Gonçalves
2025	Sentimental Value	Olivier Bugge Coutté
2025	Weapons	Joe Murphy

== See also ==
- American Cinema Editors Award for Best Edited Feature Film – Comedy or Musical
- Academy Award for Best Film Editing
- BAFTA Award for Best Editing
- Critics' Choice Movie Award for Best Editing
- Independent Spirit Award for Best Editing
