= American Cinema Editors Award for Best Edited Animated Feature Film =

Annual US film award

- Awarded for: Best Editing for an Animated Feature Film
- Country: United States
- Presented by: American Cinema Editors (ACE)
- Currently held by: Nathan Schauf – KPop Demon Hunters (2025)
- Website: americancinemaeditors.org

The American Cinema Editors Award for Best Edited Animated Feature Film is one of the annual awards given by the American Cinema Editors. This award was first given out in 2010. As of 2025, The Lego Movie, Spider-Man: Across the Spider-Verse, and The Wild Robot are the only films which have won the award without also winning the Academy Award for Best Animated Feature. Toy Story is the only franchise with multiple wins, winning two times for Toy Story 3 (2010) and Toy Story 4 (2019).

== Winners and nominees ==
=== 2000s ===
| Year | Film | Editor(s) |
|---|---|---|
| 2009 | Up | Kevin Nolting |
| 2009 | Coraline | Christopher Murrie and Ronald Sanders |
| 2009 | Fantastic Mr. Fox | Andrew Weisblum |

=== 2010s ===
| Year | Film | Editor(s) |
|---|---|---|
| 2010 | Toy Story 3 | Ken Schretzmann and Lee Unkrich |
| 2010 | Despicable Me | Gregory Perler and Pamela Ziegenhagen-Shefland |
| 2010 | How to Train Your Dragon | Maryann Brandon and Darren T. Holmes |
| 2011 | Rango | Craig Wood |
| 2011 | The Adventures of Tintin | Michael Kahn |
| 2011 | Puss in Boots | Erika Dapkewicz (Note: Awarded as Eric Dapkewicz; Dapkewicz came out as transgender and changed her name in the 2010s.) |
| 2012 | Brave | Nicholas C. Smith |
| 2012 | Frankenweenie | Chris Lebenzon and Mark Solomon |
| 2012 | Rise of the Guardians | Joyce Arrastia |
| 2012 | Wreck-It Ralph | Tim Mertens |
| 2013 | Frozen | Jeff Draheim |
| 2013 | Despicable Me 2 | Gregory Perler |
| 2013 | Monsters University | Greg Snyder |
| 2014 | The Lego Movie | David Burrows and Chris McKay |
| 2014 | Big Hero 6 | Tim Mertens |
| 2014 | The Boxtrolls | Edie Bleiman |
| 2015 | Inside Out | Kevin Nolting |
| 2015 | Anomalisa | Garrett Elkins |
| 2015 | The Good Dinosaur | Stephen Schaffer |
| 2016 | Zootopia | Fabienne Rawley and Jeremy Milton |
| 2016 | Kubo and the Two Strings | Christopher Murrie |
| 2016 | Moana | Jeff Draheim |
| 2017 | Coco | Steve Bloom |
| 2017 | Despicable Me 3 | Claire Dodgson |
| 2017 | The Lego Batman Movie | David Burrows, Matt Villa and John Venzon |
| 2018 | Spider-Man: Into the Spider-Verse | Robert Fisher, Jr. |
| 2018 | Incredibles 2 | Stephen Schaffer |
| 2018 | Isle of Dogs | Andrew Weisblum, Ralph Foster and Edward Bursch |
| 2019 | Toy Story 4 | Axel Geddes |
| 2019 | Frozen 2 | Jeff Draheim |
| 2019 | I Lost My Body | Benjamin Massoubre |

=== 2020s ===
| Year | Film | Editor(s) |
|---|---|---|
| 2020 | Soul | Kevin Nolting |
| 2020 | The Croods: A New Age | James Ryan |
| 2020 | Onward | Catherine Apple |
| 2020 | Over the Moon | Edie Ichioka |
| 2020 | Wolfwalkers | Darragh Byrne, Richie Cody and Darren Holmes |
| 2021 | Encanto | Jeremy Milton |
| 2021 | Luca | Catherine Apple and Jason Hudak |
| 2021 | The Mitchells vs. the Machines | Greg Levitan |
| 2021 | Raya and the Last Dragon | Fabienne Rawley and Shannon Stein |
| 2021 | Sing 2 | Gregory Perler |
| 2022 | Guillermo del Toro's Pinocchio | Ken Schretzmann and Holly Klein |
| 2022 | The Bad Guys | John Venzon |
| 2022 | Marcel the Shell with Shoes On | Dean Fleischer Camp and Nick Paley |
| 2022 | Puss in Boots: The Last Wish | James Ryan |
| 2022 | Turning Red | Nicholas C. Smith and Steve Bloom |
| 2023 | Spider-Man: Across the Spider-Verse | Michael Andrews |
| 2023 | Elemental | Stephen Schaffer |
| 2023 | Nimona | Randy Trager and Erin Crackel |
| 2023 | The Super Mario Bros. Movie | Eric Osmond |
| 2023 | Teenage Mutant Ninja Turtles: Mutant Mayhem | Greg Levitan |
| 2024 | The Wild Robot | Mary Blee |
| 2024 | Flow | Gints Zilbalodis |
| 2024 | Inside Out 2 | Maurissa Horwitz |
| 2024 | Moana 2 | Jeremy Milton and Michael Louis Hill |
| 2024 | Wallace & Gromit: Vengeance Most Fowl | Dan Hembery |
| 2025 | KPop Demon Hunters | Nathan Schauf |
| 2025 | The Bad Guys 2 | Jesse Averna |
| 2025 | Zootopia 2 | Jeremy Milton |
