= Her Name Was Moviola =

2024 English documentary film

- Directed by: Howard Berry
- Written by: Walter Murch
- Produced by: Howard Berry
- Starring: Walter Murch; Dan Farrell; Howard Berry; Mike Leigh
- Cinematography: George Nicholls
- Edited by: Howard Berry
- Production company: The Curators!
- Release date: 14 June 2024 (world premiere)
- Running time: 70 minutes
- Country: United Kingdom
- Language: English

Her Name Was Moviola is a 2024 English documentary film written by Walter Murch, produced and directed by Howard Berry. It stars Murch and Dan Farrell, with an appearance by Mike Leigh.

The film premiered at Sheffield DocFest and was nominated for an ACE Eddie Award and an RTS Award, winning the latter in 2025.

== Plot ==
Beginning with an explanation of the intended film recreation before the separate 35mm picture and mag stripe audio reels arrive, Dan Farrell as assistant editor, proceeds to synch the rushes together, before they are screened to Murch on a Steenbeck at the Stanley Kubrick estate. Returning back to the cutting room, Farrell adds edge numbers to both the picture and audio on an Acmade numbering machine and then, breaks the reels into individual shots.

After a demonstration of how the Moviola works, Murch talks about his approach to visualising the edit, before he cuts two scenes from Mr. Turner. Using an editing bench and Acmade synchroniser, as well as the titular Moviola, the pair cut and assemble the rushes while discussing the process and considerations an editor goes through. Finally the finished edit is taken back the Kubrick Steenbeck and presented to Mike Leigh, in order for Murch to receive feedback from the director.

== Production ==
Berry approached Mike Leigh to see if he would allow him and Murch to use footage from one of his films, in order to demonstrate the historical film editing methods, and after explaining the project in detail, Leigh allowed them full access to his work.

Production began in August 2022, at BBC Elstree Centre. Filming of the dailies review, and final edit with Mike Leigh, were filmed in Childwickbury Manor. Studio shots with Berry introducing the equipment were filmed at the University of Hertfordshire. Many of the crew of the film were lecturers, students or graduates from Berry's courses at the University.

== Release and reception ==
Her Name Was Moviola debuted on 14 June 2024, at Sheffield DocFest, and in North America, at the 51st Telluride Film Festival.

=== Critical response ===
Peter Bradshaw of The Guardian, in a four star review, recognised the "radical approach" by eschewing traditional interviews and archive material in favour of a full reconstruction, and described the film as a "geekgasm". Robert Daniels, writing for RogerEbert.com, described the film as "movie magic", and praised it as "not just a wonderful experimentation, but also a necessary chapter in film history that shows the craft, the patience, and the thought process behind filmmaking".

=== Accolades ===
On 11 December 2024, the ACE announced the film had been nominated for an Eddie Award in the category of Best Edited Documentary Feature. The awards ceremony was due to be held on 18 January 2025, but was postponed to 13 March 2025 due to the Southern California wildfires. The film won a Royal Television Society East Programme award, in the category of Craft Editing.

Award	Year	Category	Nominee(s)	Result	Ref.
ACE Eddie Awards	2025	Best Edited Documentary Feature	Howard Berry	Nominated	
BAFTSS Practice Awards	2025	Practice Research	Howard Berry	Runner-up	
RTS East Programme Awards	2025	Craft Editing	Howard Berry	Won	
MeCCSA Outstanding Achievement Awards	2025	Practice Based Research of the Year	Howard Berry	Won	
