= American Cinema Editors Award for Best Edited Variety Talk/Sketch Show or Special =

Annual US television award

American Cinema Editors Award for Best Best Edited Variety Talk/Sketch Show or Special
- Awarded for: Best Editing for a Variety Talk/Sketch Show or Special
- Country: United States
- Presented by: American Cinema Editors (ACE)
- Currently held by: Bo Burnham – Bo Burnham: Inside (2021)
- Website: americancinemaeditors.org

The Best Edited Variety Talk/Sketch Show or Special is one of the annual awards given by the American Cinema Editors. The award was first presented at the 2021 ceremony.

== Winners and nominees ==
- † – indicates the winner of a Primetime Emmy Award.
- ‡ – indicates a nomination for a Primetime Emmy Award.

=== 2020s ===
Year	Program	Episode(s)	Nominees	Network
2020
2020	David Byrne's American Utopia		Adam Gough	HBO Max
2020	8:46		Steven Bognar	Netflix
2020	Dave Chappelle: The Kennedy Center Mark Twain Prize for American Humor‡		Jon Alloway, Chester G Contaoi, Brian Forbes, Brad Gilson, Pi Ware	PBS
2020	Saturday Night Live	"Host: Tom Hanks"	Sean McIlraith, Ryan McIlraith, Christopher Salerno, Devon Schwab, Ryan Spears, Paul Del Gesso, Jason Watkins	NBC
2021	Bo Burnham: Inside		Bo Burnham	Netflix
2021	A Black Lady Sketch Show	"Sister, May I Call You Oshun?"	Daysha Broadway, Stephanie Filo, and Jessica Hernández	HBO
2021	Last Week Tonight with John Oliver	"Union Busting"	Ryan Barger and Anthony Milae	HBO
