= American Cinema Editors Award for Best Edited Miniseries or Motion Picture for Television =

Annual US television award

American Cinema Editors Award for Best Edited Miniseries or Motion Picture for Television Television
- Awarded for: Best Editing in a Miniseries or Motion Picture for Television
- Country: United States
- Presented by: American Cinema Editors (ACE)
- Currently held by: Limited Series: Amy E. Duddleston – Mare of Easttown; Motion Picture: Jay Rabinowitz – Oslo (2021)
- Website: americancinemaeditors.org

The American Cinema Editors Award for Best Edited Miniseries or Motion Picture for Television is one of the annual awards given by the American Cinema Editors. It has evolved throughout the history of the American Cinema Editors Awards, narrowing it's eligibility field numerous times.

- From 1972 to 1992, the award Best Edited Television Special was presented.
- In 1978, the category Best Edited Episode from a Television Mini-Series started to be presented alongside the television special category. The award was presented until 2003.
- In 1993, the television special award was renamed and split into Best Edited Motion Picture for Commercial Television and Best Edited Motion Picture for Commercial Television. From 1996 to 1998, the categories were renamed Best Edited Two-Hour Movie for Commercial Television and Best Edited Two-Hour Movie for Non-Commercial Television. In 1999, they went back to the names from 1993 until 2003.
- From 2004 to 2008, both the categories for miniseries and television movies were reorganized into Best Edited Miniseries or Motion Picture for Commercial Television and Best Edited Miniseries or Motion Picture for Non-Commercial Television
- From 2009 to 2020, the category was presented as Best Edited Miniseries or Motion Picture for Television.
- In 2021, the category was split into Best Edited Limited Series and Best Edited Motion Picture (Non-Theatrical).

== Winners and nominees ==
- † – indicates the winner of a Primetime Emmy Award.
- ‡ – indicates a nomination for a Primetime Emmy Award.

=== 1970s ===
Best Edited Television Special

Year	Program	Nominees	Network
1972
1972	Visions of Death	Ira Heymann	CBS
1972	Short Walk to Daylight	Sam E. Waxman	ABC
1972	That Certain Summer	Edward M. Abroms	ABC
1972	Gargoyles	Frank P. Keller	CBS
1973
1973	Portrait: A Man Whose Name Was John	Richard G. Wray	ABC
1973	The Blue Knight	Marjorie Fowler, Samuel E. Beetley	NBC
1973	The Red Pony	Marsh Hendry	NBC
1973	Isn't It Shocking?	Henry Berman	ABC
1974
1974	The Execution of Private Slovik†	Frank Morriss	NBC
1974	QB VII†	Byron 'Buzz' Brandt, Irving Rosenblum	ABC
1974	The Red Badge of Courage	George Jay Nicholson	NBC
1975
1975	Babe‡	Henry Berman	CBS
1975	Love Among the Ruins	John F. Burnett	ABC
1975	The Night That Panicked America‡	Bud S. Isaacs, Tony Radecki, George Jay Nicholson	ABC
1976
1976	Eleanor and Franklin†	Michael Kahn	ABC
1976	Sybil	Rita Roland, Michael S. McLean	NBC
1976	21 Hours at Munich‡	Ronald J. Fagan	ABC
1976	Victory at Entebbe	David Saxon, Michael Gavaldon, Jim McElroy	ABC
1977
1977	Eleanor and Franklin: The White House Years†	Rita Roland, Michael S. McLean	ABC
1977	Roots	James T. Heckert, Peter Kirby, Neil Travis	ABC
1977	Washington: Behind Closed Doors	Arthur Hilton, Harry Kaye, Gerard Wilson	ABC
1978
1978	The Defection of Simas Kudirka†	John A. Martinelli	CBS
1978	Battlestar Galactica	Robert L. Kimble, Leon Ortiz-Gil, Larry Strong	ABC
1978	First, You Cry‡	James Galloway	CBS
1979
1979	The Jericho Mile†	Arthur Schmidt	ABC
1979	When Hell Was in Session‡	John Woodcock	NBC
1979	The Miracle Worker	Gerald Lee Taylor	NBC
1979	The Cracker Factory	John A. Martinelli	ABC
1979	Silent Victory: The Kitty O'Neil Story	Jerrold L. Ludwig	CBS

Best Edited Episode from a Television Mini-Series

Year	Program	Episode(s)	Nominees	Network
1978
1978	Holocaust	"The Final Solution"	Craig McKay, Stephen A. Rotter	NBC
1978	Holocaust	"The Family Weiss"	Robert M. Reitano, Stephen A. Rotter	NBC
1978	Holocaust	"The Saving Remnant"	Alan Heim, Stephen A. Rotter, Brian Smedley-Aston	NBC
1979
1979	Ike‡	"Part III"	John Woodcock, Bill Lenny	ABC
1979	Blind Ambition	"Part II"	Peter Parasheles	CBS
1979	Flesh & Blood		Gerard Wilson	CBS

=== 1980s ===
Best Edited Television Special

Year	Program	Nominees	Network
1980
1980	Kenny Rogers as The Gambler‡	Jerrold L. Ludwig	CBS
1980	A Cry for Love	James Galloway	NBC
1980	Fighting Back: The Rocky Bleier Story	A. David Marshall	ABC
1981
1981	Hallmark Hall of Fame: The Marva Collins Story	Marjorie Fowler	CBS
1981	Jacqueline Bouvier Kennedy	Edward A. Biery, John Nielson, Kent State, Paul LaMastra	ABC
1981	A Gun in the House	Jerrold L. Ludwig	CBS
1982
1982	A Piano for Mrs. Cimino‡	Rita Roland	CBS
1982	Mae West	George Jay Nicholson	ABC
1982	Missing Children: A Mother's Story	Byron 'Buzz' Brandt	CBS
1983
1983	Heart of Steel	Scott Conrad	ABC
1983	Who Will Love My Children?‡	Jerrold L. Ludwig	ABC
1983	Bill: On His Own	John C. Horger	CBS
1984
1984	A Streetcar Named Desire†	Jerrold L. Ludwig	ABC
1984	The Dollmaker	Rita Roland	ABC
1984	The Burning Bed‡	Michael A. Stevenson, Richard Fetterman	NBC
1985
1985	Do You Remember Love	David Rosenbloom	CBS
1985	The Rape of Richard Beck	Millie Moore, Maurie Beck	ABC
1985	An Early Frost†	Jerrold L. Ludwig	NBC
1985	Into Thin Air	Eric A. Sears	CBS
1986
1986	Women of Valor	Les Green	CBS
1986	Under the Influence	David Rosenbloom	CBS
1986	Unnatural Causes‡	Paul LaMastra	CBS
1986	Stagecoach	Geoffrey Rowland	CBS
1987
1987	Hallmark Hall of Fame: Foxfire‡	Paul LaMastra	CBS
1987	Right to Die	James Galloway	NBC
1987	The Father Clements Story	Byron 'Buzz' Brandt	NBC
1988
1988	The Taking of Flight 847: The Uli Derickson Story‡	James Galloway	NBC
1988	The Attic: The Hiding of Anne Frank‡	Jerrold L. Ludwig	CBS
1988	In the Line of Duty: The F.B.I. Murders	Byron 'Buzz' Brandt, Anita Brandt Burgoyne	NBC
1989
1989	Howard Beach: Making a Case for Murder	Byron 'Buzz' Brandt	NBC
1989	Hallmark Hall of Fame: My Name Is Bill W.‡	Paul Rubell, John Wright	ABC
1989	Roe vs. Wade‡	Joe Ann Fogle, Elodie Keene	NBC

Best Edited Episode for a Television Mini-Series

Year	Program	Episode(s)	Nominees	Network
1980
1980	Great Performances	"Life on the Mississippi"	Cynthia Scheider, Bill Lenny	PBS
1980	Guyana Tragedy: The Story of Jim Jones	"Episode 111"	Tony de Zarraga, Aaron Stell	CBS
1980	Shogun	"Episode I"	James T. Heckert, Bill Luciano, Donald R. Rode, Benjamin A. Weissman, Jerry Young	NBC
1981
1981	Masada‡	"Episode IV"	Peter Kirby, Edwin F. England	ABC
1981	Murder in Texas†	"Part II"	John A. Martinelli	NBC
1981	Manions of America	"Part I"	Michael Brown	ABC
1982
1982	The Blue and the Gray	"Part I"‡	Fred A. Chulack, Bud Friedgen	CBS
1982	Marco Polo	"Part III"	John A. Martinelli	NBC
1982	A Woman Called Golda†	"Part I"	Robert F. Shugrue	Syndicated
1983
1983	The Thorn Birds	"Part I"‡	Robert F. Shugrue	ABC
1983	Chiefs	"Part III"	Eric Albertson, John J. Dumas, Armond Lebowitz	CBS
1983	The Thorn Birds	"Part III"†	Carroll Timothy O'Meara	ABC
1984
1984	Fatal Vision	"Part II"	Parkie L. Singh, William B. Stich	NBC
1984	Ellis Island	"Part I"	John J. Dumas, Bernard Gribble	CBS
1984	Ellis Island	"Part II"	Bernard Gribble, John J. Dumas	CBS
1985
1985	Wallenberg: A Hero's Story†	"Part II"	Paul LaMastra	NBC
1985	North and South: Book I	"Part IV"‡	Scott C. Eyler, Michael Eliot	ABC
1985	Wallenberg: A Hero's Story†	"Part I"	Paul LaMastra	NBC
1985	Mussolini: The Untold Story	"Part I"	Ronald J. Fagan, Rod Stephens, Noelle Imparato	NBC
1986
1986	The Deliberate Stranger	"Part II"	Ronald LaVine, Howard Kunin, Lori Jane Coleman	NBC
1986	George Washington II: The Forging of a Nation	"Part II"	Ronald J. Fagan, William B. Stich	CBS
1986	North and South: Book II	"Part IV"	Eric A. Sears, David Saxon	ABC
1987
1987	Murder Ordained	"Part I"	Benjamin A. Weissman	CBS
1987	The Two Mrs. Grenvilles	"Part II"	Jerrold L. Ludwig	NBC
1987	Queenie	"Part II"	Eric A. Sears, Michael Ripps	ABC
1988
1988	The Murder of Mary Phagan†		John A. Martinelli	NBC
1988	Baby M	"Part I"	Paul LaMastra, Eric A. Sears	ABC
1988	Jack the Ripper	"Part II"	Keith Palmer	CBS
1988	Beryl Markham: A Shadow on the Sun	"Part II"	Robert K. Lambert, David A. Simmons, Fabien D. Tordjmann	CBS
1989
1989	War and Remembrance	"Part I and II"	Peter Zinner, John F. Burnett	ABC
1989	Around the World in 80 Days	"Part III"	Les Green, David Beatty, Peter Parasheles	NBC
1989	Lonesome Dove	"The Plains"‡	Corky Ehlers	CBS

=== 1990s ===
Best Edited Television Special

Year	Program	Nominees	Network
1990
1990	A Killing in a Small Town	Harvey Rosenstock	CBS
1990	The Court-Martial of Jackie Robinson‡	Eric A. Sears, Bob Wyman	TNT
1990	Hiroshima: Out of the Ashes‡	Robert Florio	NBC
1991
1991	Hallmark Hall of Fame: Sarah, Plain and Tall†	John Wright	CBS
1991	Murder in New Hampshire: The Pamela Wojas Smart Story	Robert Florio	CBS
1991	Paris Trout	Harvey Rosenstock	Showtime
1992
1992	Citizen Cohn†	Peter Zinner	HBO
1992	Something to Live for: The Alison Gertz Story	Charles Bornstein, Sidney Wolinsky	ABC
1992	Afterburn‡	Jerrold L. Ludwig	HBO
1992	When No One Would Listen	Daniel T. Cahn	CBS

Best Edited Motion Picture for Commercial Television

Year	Program	Nominees	Network
1993
1993	Murder of Innocence	Charles Bornstein	CBS
1993	Geronimo‡	Millie Moore	TNT
1993	Gypsy‡	William Reynolds	CBS
1994
1994	A Place for Annie	Robert Florio	ABC
1994	Leave of Absence	Charles Bornstein	NBC
1994	Lily in Winter	Ralph E. Winters, Harry Kaye	USA Network
1994	Cries from the Heart	Robert Florio	CBS
1995
1995	Kingfish: A Story of Huey P. Long	Paul Dixon	TNT
1995	JAG (pilot episode)	Jon Koslowsky	NBC
1995	A Streetcar Named Desire	David A. Simmons	CBS

Best Edited Two-Hour Movie for Commercial Television

Year	Program	Nominees	Network
1996
1996	The Man Who Captured Eichmann‡	Drake Silliman	TNT
1996	Apollo 11	Allan Holzman	The Family Channel
1996	Crazy Horse	Mark Conte	TBS
1997
1997	Little Girls in Pretty Boxes	Martin Nicholson	Lifetime
1997	Hope	Michael D. Ornstein	TNT
1997	The Member of the Wedding	Paul LaMastra	USA Network
1997	Cindirella	Casey O. Rohrs, Tanya M. Swerling	ABC
1998
1998	About Sarah	Henk Van Eeghen	CBS
1998	The Tempest	Stephen Lovejoy	NBC
1998	The Long Island Incident	Michael Brown	NBC
1998	Ruby Bridges	Paul LaMastra	ABC

Best Edited Motion Picture for Commercial Television

Year	Program	Nominees	Network
1999
1999	Pirates of Silicon Valley‡	Richard Halsey	TNT
1999	Behind the Mask	Charles Bornstein, Tina Hirsch	CBS
1999	A Slight Case of Murder	Paul Dixon	TNT

Best Edited Motion Picture for Non-Commercial Television

Year	Program	Nominees	Network
1993
1993	And the Band Played On†	Lois Freeman-Fox	HBO
1993	Barbarians at the Gate‡	Patrick Kennedy	HBO
1993	The Positively True Adventures of the Alleged Texas Cheerleader-Murdering Mom	Eric A. Sears	HBO
1994
1994	Against the Wall	Lee Percy	HBO
1994	The Burning Season	Françoise Bonnot, Paul Rubell	HBO
1994	White Mile	John Duffy	HBO
1995
1995	Indictment: The McMartin Trial†	Richard A. Harris	HBO
1995	The Tuskegee Airmen†	David Beatty	HBO
1995	Truman‡	Lisa Fruchtman	HBO

Best Edited Two-Hour Movie for Non-Commercial Television

Year	Program	Nominees	Network
1996
1996	Gotti‡	Zach Staenberg	HBO
1996	Hallmark Hall of Fame: Lily Dale	Michael N. Knue	CBS
1996	Losing Chase	Alan Baumgarten	Showtime
1997
1997	Don King: Only in America‡	Steven Cohen	HBO
1997	Miss Evers' Boys†	Michael Brown	HBO
1997	Breast Men	Michael Jablow	HBO
1998
1998	Gia†	Eric A. Sears	HBO
1998	Blind Faith	Stephen Lovejoy	Showtime
1998	The Rat Pack‡	Eric A. Sears	HBO

Best Edited Motion Picture for Non-Commercial Television

Year	Program	Nominees	Network
1999
1999	Introducing Dorothy Dandridge‡	Alan Heim	HBO
1999	Strange Justice	Stephen Lovejoy	Showtime
1999	RKO 281‡	Alex Mackie	HBO

Best Edited Episode from a Television Mini-Series

Year	Program	Episode(s)	Nominees	Network
1990
1990	It‡		Robert F. Shugrue, David Blangsted	ABC
1990	Blind Faith	"Part II"‡	Christopher Cooke, James Galloway	NBC
1990	Women & Men: Stories of Seduction	"Hills Like White 13 Elephants"	Robert K. Lambert	HBO
1991
1991	Switched at Birth	"Part I"	Paul Dixon, James Galloway	NBC
1991	Separate but Equal	"Part II"‡	John W. Wheeler	ABC
1991	Son of the Morning Star	"Part I"	Benjamin A. Weissman	ABC
1992
1992	The Burden of Proof	"Part II"	Benjamin A. Weissman	ABC
1992	Drug Wars: The Cocaine Cartel	"Part II"‡	Douglas Ibold	NBC
1992	Sinatra	"Part I"‡	Scott Vickrey	CBS
1993
1993	A Year in Provence	"Summer"	Jon Gregory, Chris Wimble	A&E
1993	Love, Honor & Obey: The Last Mafia Marriage	"Part I"	Robert L. Sinise	CBS
1993	Queen	"Part III"‡	Paul LaMastra, James Galloway	CBS
1994
1994	Oldest Living Confederate Widow Tells All	"Part I"	Tod Feuerman, Charles Bornstein	CBS
1994	Baseball	"The National Pastime"	Paul Barnes, Michael Levine	PBS
1994	World War II: When Lions Roared	"Part II"	John A. Martinelli	NBC
1995
1995	Hiroshima‡	"Part I"	Denis Papillon, Dominique Fortin, John Soh, Mark Conte	Showtime
1995	Children of the Dust	"Part I"	Tod Feuerman	CBS
1995	OP Center	"Part I"	Tina Hirsch	NBC
1996
1996	Andersonville†‡	"Part II"	Paul Rubell	TNT
1996	In Cold Blood‡	"Part II"	Michael D. Ornstein	CBS
1996	The Siege at Ruby Ridge	"Part II"	Benjamin A. Weissman, Dennis C. Vejar	CBS
1997
1997	George Wallace	"Part II"	Antony Gibbs	TNT
1997	The Shining	"Part II"	Patrick McMahon	ABC
1997	Asteroid	"Part I"	Buford F. Hayes	NBC
1998
1998	Mama Flora's Family	"Part I"	Tod Feuerman	CBS
1998	From the Earth to the Moon	"1968"‡	Richard Pearson	HBO
1998	The Temptations	"Part I"	John Duffy, Neil Mandelberg	NBC
1999
1999	The '60s	"Part II"	Robert Frazen	NBC
1999	Cleopatra	"Part I"	Peter Coulson	ABC
1999	The Hunt for the Unicorn Killer	"Part I"	Drake Silliman	NBC

=== 2000s ===
Best Edited Motion Picture for Commercial Television

Year	Program	Nominees	Network
2000
2000	Dark Angel (pilot episode)	Stephen Mark	Fox
2000	In His Life: The John Lennon Story	Lisa Bromwell	NBC
2000	The Loretta Claiborne Story	Drake Silliman	ABC
2001
2001	James Dean‡	Antony Gibbs	TNT
2001	The Lost Battalion‡	William B. Stich	A&E
2001	Life with Judy Garland: Me and My Shadows‡	Dody Dorn	ABC
2002
2002	We Were the Mulvaneys	Tod Feuerman	Lifetime
2002	Murder in Greenwich	Charles Bornstein	USA Network
2002	Door to Door‡	Paul Dixon	TNT

Best Edited Motion Picture for Non-Commercial Television

Year	Program	Nominees	Network
2000
2000	Dirty Pictures	Peter Zinner	Showtime
2000	Cheaters	Eric A. Sears	HBO
2000	Noriega: God's Favorite	Mark Conte	Showtime
2001
2001	The Day Reagan Was Shot	Paul Seydor	Showtime
2001	61*‡	Michael Jablow	HBO
2001	My Louisiana Sky	Paul Dixon	Showtime
2002
2002	Our America	Stephen Lovejoy	Showtime
2002	Live from Baghdad	Joe Hutshing	HBO
2002	Joe and Max	Norman Buckley	Starz

Best Edited Episode from a Television Mini-Series

Year	Program	Episode(s)	Nominees	Network
2000
2000	The Beach Boys: An American Family	"Part I"‡	Geoffrey Rowland, Bryan M. Horne	ABC
2000	The Corner	"Gary's Blues"	Bill Pankow	HBO
2000	Nuremberg	"Part II"	Yves Langlois	TNT
2001
2001	Band of Brothers	"Day of Days"†	Frances Parker	HBO
2001	The Mists of Avalon	"Part I"	Benjamin A. Weissman	TNT
2001	Uprising	"Part II"	Sabrina Plisco	NBC
2002
2002	The Forsyte Saga	"Part I"	Tony Cranstoun, Anthony Ham	PBS
2002	Taken	"Jacob and Jesse"	Michael D. Ornstein	Sci-Fi Channel
2002	Fidel	"Part One"	Milton Moses Ginsberg	Showtime

Best Edited Miniseries or Motion Picture for Commercial Television

Year	Program	Episode(s)	Nominees	Network
2003
2003	Julius Caesar	"Part II"	Mark Conte	TNT
2003	44 Minutes: The North Hollywood Shoot-Out		William B. Stich	FX
2003	Homeless to Harvard: The Liz Murray Story‡		Anita Brandt Burgoyne	Lifetime
2004
2004	Redemption: The Stan Tookie Williams Story		Terilyn A. Shropshire	FX
2004	Back When We Were Grownups‡		Tina Hirsch	CBS
2004	The Wool Cap‡		Paul Dixon	TNT
2005
2005	Four Minutes		Michael D. Ornstein	ESPN2
2005	Their Eyes Were Watching God		Peter C. Frank	ABC
2005	Code Breakers		Michael Brown	ESPN
2006
2006	The Path to 9/11	"Part 2"‡	Geoffrey Rowland, Eric A. Sears, Bryan M. Horne, David Handman, Mitchell Danton	ABC
2006	Lost	"Live Together, Die Alone"	Sue Blainey, Sarah Boyd, Stephen Semel	ABC
2006	The Ron Clark Story		Heather Persons	TNT
2007
2007	The Company	"Episode 2"	Scott Vickrey, Robert A. Ferretti	TNT
2007	Lost	"Through the Looking Glass"	Henk Van Eeghen, Mark Goldman, Stephen Semel, Christopher Nelson	ABC
2007	Pictures of Hollis Woods		Paul Dixon	CBS
2008
2008	24: Redemption‡		Scott Powell	Fox
2008	The Librarian: Curse of the Judas Chalice		David Siegel	TNT
2008	Lost	"There's No Place Like Home"	Henk Van Eeghen, Robert Florio, Mark Goldman, Stephen Semel	ABC

Best Edited Miniseries or Motion Picture for Non-Commercial Television

Year	Program	Episode(s)	Nominees	Network
2003
2003	Angels in America	"Millennium Approaches"‡	John Bloom, Antonia Van Drimmelen	HBO
2003	Good Fences		Stephen Lovejoy	Showtime
2003	The Reagans		Michael Brown, Melissa Kent	Showtime
2004
2004	Something the Lord Made		Michael Brown	HBO
2004	Coast to Coast		Richard Halsey	Showtime
2004	The Life and Death of Peter Sellers†		John Smith	HBO
2005
2005	Lackawanna Blues		Brian A. Kates	HBO
2005	Reefer Madness: The Movie Musical		Jeff Freeman	Showtime
2005	Warm Springs		Michael Brown	HBO
2006
2006	Prime Suspect	"The Final Act: Part 1"	Trevor Waite	PBS
2006	Elizabeth I	"Part I"‡	Beverley Mills	HBO
2006	Mrs. Harris		Curtiss Clayton, Lee Percy	HBO
2007
2007	Pu-239		Tatiana S. Riegel, Leo Trombetta	HBO
2007	Bury My Heart at Wounded Knee†		Michael D. Ornstein, Michael Brown	HBO
2007	Life Support		Mary Jo Markey	HBO
2008
2008	Recount†		Alan Baumgarten	HBO
2008	Bernard and Doris		Andy Keir	HBO
2008	John Adams	"Independence"‡	Melanie Oliver	HBO

Best Edited Miniseries or Motion Picture for Television

Year	Program	Episode(s)	Nominees	Network
2009
2009	Grey Gardens‡		Alan Heim, Lee Percy	HBO
2009	Taking Chance†		Lee Percy, Brian A. Kates	HBO
2009	Into the Storm		John Bloom, Antonia Van Drimmelen	HBO

=== 2010s ===
Best Edited Miniseries or Motion Picture for Television

Year	Program	Episode(s)	Nominees	Network
2010
2010	Temple Grandin†		Leo Trombetta	HBO
2010	The Pacific	"Okinawa"‡	Marta Evry, Alan Cody	HBO
2010	You Don't Know Jack		Aaron Yanes‡	HBO
2011
2011	Cinema Verite†		Sarah Flack, Robert Pulcini	HBO
2011	Downton Abbey	"Episode One"‡	John Wilson	PBS
2011	Mildred Pierce	"Part 1"	Affonso Gonçalves	HBO
2012
2012	Game Change‡		Lucia Zucchetti	HBO
2012	Hatfields & McCoys	"Part 1"	Don Cassidy	History
2012	Hemingway & Gellhorn‡		Walter Murch	HBO
2013
2013	Behind the Candelabra†		Mary Ann Bernard	HBO
2013	American Horror Story: Asylum	"The Name Game"	Stewart Schill	FX
2013	Phil Spector‡		Barbara Tulliver	HBO
2014
2014	The Normal Heart‡		Adam Penn	HBO
2014	Fargo	"Buridan's Ass"‡	Regis Kimble	FX
2014	Olive Kitteridge	"A Different Road"	Jeffrey M. Werner	HBO
2015
2015	Bessie		Brian A. Kates	HBO
2015	Dolly Parton's Coat of Many Colors		Maysie Hoy	NBC
2015	Orange Is the New Black	"Trust No Bitch"	Jeffrey M. Werner	Netflix
2016
2016	All the Way		Carol Littleton	HBO
2016	The Night Of†		Jay Cassidy	HBO
2016	The People v. O. J. Simpson: American Crime Story	"Marcia, Marcia, Marcia"	Adam Penn, Stewart Schill and C. Chi-yoon Chung	FX
2017
2017	Genius	"Einstein: Chapter One"	James D. Wilcox	Nat Geo
2017	Feud: Bette and Joan	"Pilot"	Adam Penn and Ken Ramos	FX
2017	The Wizard of Lies		Ron Patane	HBO
2018
2018	Escape at Dannemora	"Better Days"	Malcolm Jamieson, Geoffrey Richman	Showtime
2018	The Assassination of Gianni Versace: American Crime Story	"A Random Killing"	Emily Greene	FX
2018	Sharp Objects	"Milk"	Veronique Barbe, Dominique Champagne, Justin Lachance, Maxime Lahaie, Émile Vallée and Jai M. Vee	HBO
2019
2019	Chernobyl	"Vichnaya Pamyat"	Jinx Godfrey, Simon Smith	HBO
2019	Fosse/Verdon	"Life is a Cabaret"‡	Tim Streeto	FX
2019	When They See Us	"Part 1"	Terilyn A. Shropshire	Netflix

=== 2020s ===
Year	Program	Episode(s)	Nominees	Network
2020
2020	The Queen's Gambit	"Exchanges"‡	Michelle Tesoro	Netflix
2020	Hamilton		Jonah Moran	Disney+
2020	Mrs. America	"Phyllis"‡	Robert Komatsu	FX
2020	Watchmen	"This Extraordinary Being"	Anna Hauger	HBO

Best Edited Limited Series

Year	Program	Episode(s)	Nominees	Network
2021	Mare of Easttown	"Illusions"	Amy E. Duddleston	HBO
2021	Dopesick	"First Bottle"	Douglas Crise	Hulu
2021	Mare of Easttown	"Fathers"	Amy E. Duddleston and Naomi Sunrise Filoramo	HBO
2021	The White Lotus	"Departures"	John M. Valerio	HBO
2021	The White Lotus	"Mysterious Monkeys"	Heather Persons	HBO

Best Edited Motion Picture (Non-Theatrical)

Year	Program	Nominees	Network
2021	Oslo	Jay Rabinowitz	HBO
2021	Kate	Sandra Montiel and Elísabet Ronaldsdóttir	Netflix
2021	Lupe	Shiran Carolyn Amir	HBO
