= Magnolia Hill Productions =

Film and television production company

- Company type: Production Company
- Industry: Entertainment
- Founded: 2013
- Founder: Sam Haskell
- Key people: Sam Haskell

Magnolia Hill Productions is a film and television production company founded by Sam Haskell, former executive vice president and worldwide head of television at the William Morris Agency. The company currently has an exclusive deal with Warner Bros. Television.

Established in 2013, Magnolia Hill was created to bring forth family friendly and inspirational content. The company has produced multiple shows with the country music icon Dolly Parton. They include Dolly Parton's Coat of Many Colors and the Emmy nominated Dolly Parton's Christmas of Many Colors: Circle of Love both based on Parton's childhood and airing on NBC. Most recently, Magnolia Hill produced Dolly Parton's Heartstrings for Netflix, an eight-episode anthology series based on Parton's songs and stories.

== Filmography ==
Year	Project	Director
2015	Dolly Parton's Coat of Many Colors	Stephen Herek
2016	Dolly Parton's Christmas of Many Colors: Circle of Love	Stephen Herek
2019	Dolly Parton's Heartstrings	Multiple
