= United States of Al =

American television sitcom (2021–2022)

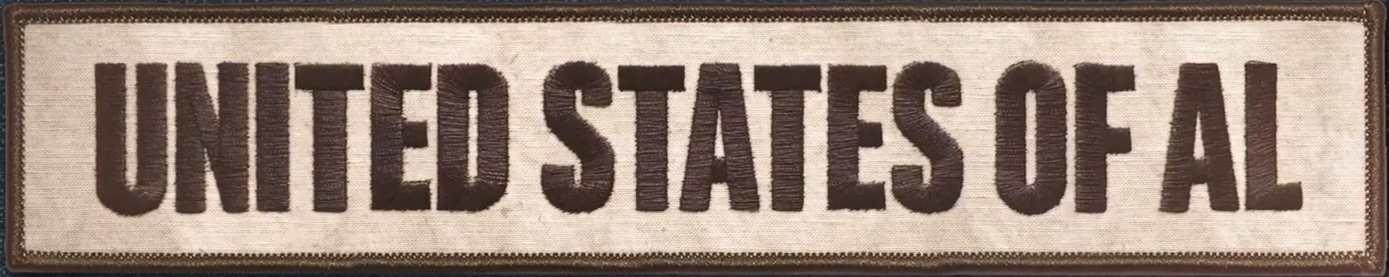
- Genre: Sitcom
- Created by: David Goetsch; Maria Ferrari
- Directed by: Mark Cendrowski; Nikki Lorre
- Starring: Adhir Kalyan; Parker Young; Elizabeth Alderfer; Kelli Goss; Dean Norris; Farrah Mackenzie
- Music by: Robert Randolph
- Opening theme: "Midnight Train to Memphis" by Chris Stapleton
- Country of origin: United States
- Original language: English
- No. of seasons: 2
- No. of episodes: 35

Production
- Executive producers: David Goetsch; Maria Ferrari; Mark Cendrowski; Reza Aslan; Mahyad Tousi; Chuck Lorre
- Producers: Jay O'Connell; Adhir Kalyan; Parker Young
- Cinematography: Christian La Fountaine
- Editor: Stephen Prime
- Camera setup: Multi-camera
- Running time: 20 minutes
- Production companies: Chuck Lorre Productions; Warner Bros. Television

Original release
- Network: CBS
- Release: April 1, 2021 – May 19, 2022

United States of Al is an American television sitcom created by David Goetsch and Maria Ferrari. It stars Adhir Kalyan and Parker Young, with Elizabeth Alderfer, Kelli Goss, Dean Norris, and Farrah Mackenzie in supporting roles. The series follows Al (Kalyan), an interpreter from Afghanistan who moves to Columbus, Ohio, with his friend Riley (Young), a veteran of the United States Marine Corps. Executive produced by Chuck Lorre, it is produced and distributed by Warner Bros. Television.

A television pilot for the series was announced in October 2019, with production beginning the following year. CBS gave United States of Al a series order in November 2020, and it aired from April 1, 2021, to May 19, 2022. Released to mixed reviews, United States of Al was criticized for its humor, use of antiquated tropes, and casting of an Indo-South African actor to play an Afghan lead with an "inauthentic accent." However, the show was praised by some for its attempts to diversify television, and for the cultural representation of its main character. At the 73rd Primetime Emmy Awards, the show's pilot received a nomination for Outstanding Production Design for a Narrative Program. In May 2021, the series was renewed for a second and final season which premiered on October 7, 2021. In May 2022, the series was canceled after two seasons.

== Premise ==
The series follows the friendship between Riley, a combat veteran, and Awalmir (Al), an interpreter from Afghanistan who helped the former while he served in the Marines. As they readjust to their normal lives in Columbus, Ohio, Al moves in with Riley and meets his father Art. He later learns Riley is going through a divorce with his wife Vanessa, who has custody of their only daughter Hazel. Trying to help his friend, who is also dealing with PTSD, Al decides to make it his mission to get Riley and Vanessa back together.

== Cast and characters ==
=== Main ===
- Adhir Kalyan as Awalmir Karimi, an interpreter from Afghanistan (born in Kandahar and moved to Kabul) who also goes by Al
- Parker Young as Riley Dugan, a Marine combat veteran trying to readjust to civilian life in Ohio
- Elizabeth Alderfer as Lizzie Dugan, the daughter of Art and the younger sister of Riley
- Kelli Goss as Vanessa, Riley's estranged wife and the mother of their daughter
- Dean Norris as Art Dugan, a veteran and the father of Riley and Lizzie
- Farrah Mackenzie as Hazel Dugan, Riley and Vanessa's daughter (Note: Mackenzie does not appear in the first two episodes, but she is credited as main cast from the third episode on.) Like her father, she is a rebellious tomboy who aspires to be a Marine when she grows up.

=== Recurring ===
- Brian Thomas Smith as Freddy, Vanessa's Canadian boyfriend
- Rachel Bay Jones as Lois, Art's new love interest
- Azita Ghanizada as Ariana (season 2; guest season 1), Kasim's daughter and Al's love interest
- Amanda Payton as Holly, Riley's girlfriend
- Blake Clark as Wayne (season 2), Riley's therapist and fellow veteran
- John Ross Bowie as Professor Brett Williams (season 2), Al's university professor and Lizzie's love interest
- Jayma Mays as Cindy (season 2)

=== Guest ===
- Patrick Cage as Michael, Lizzie's late fiancé
- Zarmina Hamidi as Gul Bashra, Al's strict mother
- Wali Habib as Zubair, Al's cousin
- Sitara Attaie as Hassina, Al's sister
- Susan Ruttan as Mrs. Foster, Al's neighbor
- Riki Lindhome as Chloe, a car dealership manager who sells Al a car
- Zadran Wali as Kasim, the owner of a restaurant Al visits
- Nikki Crawford as Barbara, Art's date
- Patrick Fischler as Clint, a rude client
- Fahim Anwar as Mo (season 2)
- Clyde Kusatsu as Doctor Tanaka (season 2)
- Myko Olivier as Todd (season 2)
- Johnny Ray Gill as Badger (season 2)
- Cameron Elie as Nate (season 2)
- Jimmy Walker, Jr. as Walt (season 2)
- Hermie Castillo as Derek (season 2)
- Erica Hanrahan as Lyla (season 2)
- Dayne Jarrah as Danny (season 2)
- Angel Laketa Moore as Mrs. Ro (season 2)
- Deniz Akdeniz as Dirk (season 2)
- Artoun Nazareth as Luke (season 2)
- Ahan Das Chowdhury as Sanjay (season 2)
- George Sharperson as Gus (season 2)

== Episodes ==
=== Series overview ===
| Season | Episodes | Originally released | |
| Season | Episodes | First released | Last released |
|---|---|---|---|
| 1 | 13 | April 1, 2021 | June 24, 2021 |
| 2 | 22 | October 7, 2021 | May 19, 2022 |

=== Season 1 (2021) ===
| No. overall | No. in season | Title | Directed by | Written by | Original release date | Prod. code | U.S. viewers (millions) |
|---|---|---|---|---|---|---|---|
| 1 | 1 | "Pilot" | Mark Cendrowski | Maria Ferrari & David Goetsch | April 1, 2021 | T11.10132 | 5.31 |
In Columbus, Ohio, Marine combat veteran Riley, who served in Afghanistan, and his younger sister Lizzie reunite at the airport with Riley's interpreter Awalmir, who goes by "Al", who will spend his first weeks in the United States living in their garage. After learning Riley is going through a divorce with his wife Vanessa, Al meets Riley's father Art, who is also a veteran. At night, Al is pulled over for driving too slow and is let go with a warning by a police officer who is also a Marine. The next day, Al sets up a reunion between Riley and Vanessa, where they drink tea and talk about their failed marriage. In a flashback to Helmand Province, Afghanistan, in 2011, Al yells at Riley for giving him a gun without bullets.
| 2 | 2 | "Repair / Tarmim" | Nikki Lorre | Teleplay by : Andy Gordon & Bobby Telatovich & Habib Zahori; Story by : Maria Ferrari & Dave Goetsch & Chuck Lorre | April 8, 2021 | T12.16903 | 5.38 |
After a water leak occurs, Riley and Al visit Vanessa at her home to avoid paying for a plumber. Talking with each of them separately, Al learns that Riley cheated on Vanessa while they were still married and that Riley suspected Vanessa of having an affair with their friend Freddy while he was deployed. Riley learns Vanessa and Freddy were platonic friends while he was deployed, but have recently started dating. Later in the day, Riley finishes fixing the leak and talks privately with Vanessa about his past feelings. Meanwhile, Lizzie tells Art that she lost the military dog tags of her late fiance Michael while at a party; the pair uses a metal detector to successfully find the tags. In a flashback set "three years ago", a happily married Riley and Vanessa meet with the recently engaged Lizzie and Michael, where the guys refer to themselves as the luckiest people on Earth.
| 3 | 3 | "Shorts / Neykar" | Mark Cendrowski | Teleplay by : Maria Ferrari & Dave Goetsch & Andy Gordon; Story by : Habib Zahori | April 15, 2021 | T12.16902 | 5.45 |
Al greets Riley's daughter Hazel and introduces himself as her godfather. On a video call with his mother, Al is berated for wearing shorts, as it is against his religion as a Muslim to do so. The following day, Al and Riley go to the DMV, where Al becomes nervous after seeing that his female driving instructor, Paula, is also wearing shorts and, as a result, fails his driving test. Wanting to adjust to American social norms, Al talks with Riley, Art, and an offended Lizzie to sort things out, deciding to avoid forcing his religion on other people. In his following visit to the DMV with Paula as his driving instructor, Al overcomes his issues by acknowledging both Paula and himself are wearing shorts, only to become nervous once again after stopping at a traffic light next to a charity car wash with bikini-clad women.
| 4 | 4 | "Spinach / Sabzi" | Nikki Lorre | Teleplay by : Fahim Anwar & Anthony Del Broccolo & Habib Zahori; Story by : Emily Ann Brandstetter & Chuck Lorre & Ursula Taherian | April 22, 2021 | T12.16904 | 5.37 |
Al becomes worried about Riley's parenting style, as he believes Hazel has become a spoiled child. After Al tells Art that Hazel should show signs of respect by helping around the house without requiring something in return, Art falls off the roof while trying to fix the chimney and is sent to the hospital, and Al spends a day taking care of Hazel. At the ER, Riley agrees on a previous offer to work for his father at a construction company, under the condition that Al can work there too. Throughout the week, Al also starts messaging his cousin, Zubair, as the pair enjoy boasting about their possessions; the pair eventually start using Photoshop to show off.
| 5 | 5 | "Homesick / Deghyat" | Nikki Lorre | Teleplay by : Dave Goetsch & Andy Gordon & Habib Zahori; Story by : Reza Aslan & Maria Ferrari & Mahyad Tousi | April 29, 2021 | T12.16905 | 5.25 |
After failing to communicate and connect with his neighbors by offering his homemade rice pudding as a gift, Al starts wishing he was once again with his family in Afghanistan. Wanting to help, Riley makes Al start boxing in their garage to forget about his worries and express his feelings; Riley admits he would want to be back together with Vanessa if she left Freddy. On a video call, Al tells his sister Hassina that he misses his family. Lizzie overhears and talks to Al, who further explains his homesickness. Later, Riley takes Al to a bar, where Al receives a bartender's phone number. At home, Riley's family hosts a dinner wearing clothes and cooking food from Afghanistan, delighting Al. Al and Lizzie then talk at the fireplace where Lizzie concludes Al's homesickness as grief over leaving Afghanistan for good. The two then bond over their shared heartbreak over Michael's death.
| 6 | 6 | "Fundraiser / Baspana Towlawal" | Nikki Lorre | Teleplay by : Fahim Anwar & Emily Ann Brandstetter & Bobby Telatovich; Story by : Joshua Keller Katz & Chuck Lorre & Chase Millsap | May 6, 2021 | T12.16906 | 4.80 |
Art invites Riley and Al to a fundraiser to make speeches while Lizzie is told to make a slideshow. While dropping off Hazel, Riley and Freddy have an awkward conversation. At home, Al tells Lizzie that Riley has changed since his return to Ohio, and appears to be "lost". At the fundraiser, Riley becomes anxious and leaves after seeing the slideshow project images of him in uniform. Soon after, Al makes a speech, where he talks about the 17,000 interpreters in Afghanistan waiting for visas, calls Riley a hero and a brother, and sings "It's Not Unusual". Finding him at a baseball park, Vanessa gives Riley food and Aspirin. The pair later see Al's speech on their phone and notice an ecstatic Lizzie.
| 7 | 7 | "Car / Motar" | Nikki Lorre | Teleplay by : Maria Ferrari & Dave Goetsch & Andy Gordon; Story by : Hila Hamidi & Chuck Lorre & Habib Zahori | May 13, 2021 | T12.16907 | 5.23 |
After receiving his first paycheck, Al states that he wants to help Riley's family and his own in Afghanistan, while also dreaming of buying a car. As a result, Riley takes Al to a car dealership, where the pair negotiate to get a better deal and buy a car for monthly payments. However, Lizzie informs them that they were, in fact, ripped off through future payments with 20 percent interest, and Riley realizes that he also made a bad deal when buying his truck three years ago. Finding out that he can not return the car, Al decides to take another job to pay for it, and is hired at the local supermarket. At home, Riley gives Al cash he received after selling his bike to help Al with his car payments.
| 8 | 8 | "Roht / Sweet Bread" | Mark Cendrowski | Teleplay by : Miriam Arghandiwal & Maria Ferrari & Habib Zahori; Story by : Fahim Anwar & Hila Hamidi & Ursula Taherian | May 20, 2021 | T12.16910 | 4.05 |
Al is delivered his family's homemade roht (a type of sweet bread) from Afghanistan but becomes disappointed when he finds out that it has gone stale. To surprise him, Riley's family searches for a place selling roht and finds one outside of Cleveland. Along with Al, they go to the restaurant and Al becomes friends with the owner, Kasim, when they reveal they are both from Kabul. After eating, Al is introduced to Kasim's daughter, Ariana, and he experiences love at first sight. A few days later, Al visits Ariana at the restaurant and learns that she helps women from Afghanistan earn scholarships, but after revealing that he helped the Marines, Ariana becomes offended and he leaves. At home, Riley and Lizzie try to console Al, who visits Ariana again and talks to her about his service, concluding that while things in Afghanistan did not improve as he had hoped, he does not feel shame over trying to help his country the best way he knew how. After they look briefly at each other, Al pays for the tea and roht before leaving.
| 9 | 9 | "Birthday / Kaleeza" | Mark Cendrowski | Teleplay by : Maria Ferrari & Ursula Taherian & Habib Zahori; Story by : Anthony Del Broccolo & Dave Goetsch & Bobby Telatovich | May 27, 2021 | T12.16909 | 4.06 |
As Hazel's birthday is coming up, she suggests inviting Freddy, who is also a magician. Riley rejects the idea and tells her that he will do magic tricks instead. Al, on the other hand, is excited, as this is the first time he will be attending a birthday party. He also tells Hazel that he does not know when his actual birthday is, to her surprise, and the pair decide to share the party. Soon after, Freddy meets Al for the first time, and Riley learns that Hazel wants Freddy at the party, whether or not he performs magic, to his dismay. Overcoming his personal emotions, Riley invites Freddy to the double birthday party, where everyone, including him, has a nice time.
| 10 | 10 | "Matchmaker / Roybar" | Nikki Lorre | Teleplay by : Anthony Del Broccolo & Dave Goetsch & Andy Gordon; Story by : Emily Ann Brandstetter & Chuck Lorre & Ursula Taherian | June 3, 2021 | T12.16908 | 3.95 |
Al learns about Art's tradition of mourning the loss of his wife by visiting her grave with ice cream and decides to find him a date. As a result, Riley takes Al to a bingo game where they find several women Art might be interested in. At the end of the day, the pair show Art what they have found and schedule him a date with a woman named Barbara. Initially hesitant, Art agrees to go on the date after talking with Lizzie. The following day, Art meets Barbara but leaves after feeling "not ready." Outside, Art meets Lois, a divorced woman who asks for help jump-starting her car; the pair grow an interest in each other and Art decides that he is ready to date again.
| 11 | 11 | "Blackout / Parchawi" | Nikki Lorre | Teleplay by : Maria Ferrari & Dave Goetsch & Andy Gordon; Story by : Emily Ann Brandstetter & Jeff Silverstein & Habib Zahori | June 10, 2021 | T12.16911 | 3.92 |
Al becomes worried when he wakes up and realizes he can not communicate with his family in Afghanistan using his phone due to a possible power outage. At work, Riley and Al are constantly criticized by a client named Clint, who quickly annoys Al. At home, Al shares his anger and says Clint will go to hell, quietly shocking Riley's family. Trying to help, Hazel plays frisbee with Al to distract him but the pair instead have a conversation about not being able to speak with their families. Back at work, Al confronts Clint about his criticism and tells him his worries about his family. After Clint replies by saying that he does not care about his own family, Al becomes saddened and enraged; Clint fires Al and Riley. Art tries convincing Clint to let the pair finish the job. However, when Clint shares several racist comments about Al, Art becomes enraged and later tells his family: "So I'm not getting that job back." Soon after, Al manages to get in contact with his family and immediately becomes happier.
| 12 | 12 | "Dog / Spai" | Mark Cendrowski | Teleplay by : Fahim Anwar & Anthony Del Broccolo & Ursula Taherian; Story by : Andy Gordon & Chuck Lorre & Habib Zahori | June 17, 2021 | T12.16912 | 4.05 |
While Art continues dating Lois and they almost share a kiss, Riley and Hazel find a dog while riding their bicycles. A frightened Al encourages them to leave it in the wild while the pair decide to look for its owner. Later in the day, Riley shares his true intentions to Vanessa that he and Hazel want to keep it. After a discussion, Al decides to move with Vanessa until the dog is taken care of. He returns a few days later. Soon after, Riley informs Hazel that the dog's owner called and that they have to return it. In a flashback set "eleven years ago", Lizzie records several videos of Vanessa taking care of a baby Hazel before sending them all to Riley in Afghanistan.
| 13 | 13 | "Help / Komak" | Mark Cendrowski | Teleplay by : Emily Ann Brandstetter & Anthony Del Broccolo & Bobby Telatovich; Story by : Maria Ferrari & Dave Goetsch & Chuck Lorre | June 24, 2021 | T12.16913 | 3.83 |
Riley is suffering from tinnitus. As a result, Al asks Riley to apply for disability at the Department of Veterans Affairs (VA). Riley, who does not want to, rejects the idea, screams at Al, and gets drunk at a bar. While Hazel goes camping in her backyard and sets up a tent with her family, Lizzie leaves to pick Riley up but is tricked into drinking. Now drunk, she calls Al, who arrives and criticizes Riley and Lizzie for their actions. Back home, Riley apologizes to Art, who also criticizes him; Riley goes to the kitchen and cries. The next day, he drops Hazel off with Vanessa and tells her that he will apply for disability at VA. In a flashback set in Afghanistan, Riley shows Al that he broke his finger.

=== Season 2 (2021–22) ===
| No. overall | No. in season | Title | Directed by | Written by | Original release date | Prod. code | U.S. viewers (millions) |
|---|---|---|---|---|---|---|---|
| 14 | 1 | "Promises / Wadaha" | Mark Cendrowski | Teleplay by : Emily Ann Brandstetter & Maria Ferrari & Dave Goetsch & Ursula Taherian & Chuck Tatham & Habib Zahori; Story by : Miriam Arghandiwal & Reza Aslan & Hila Hamidi & Chase Millsap & Bobby Telatovich & Mahyad Tousi | October 7, 2021 | T12.17354 | 4.84 |
With Afghanistan falling under Taliban control, Al and Riley do everything they can to ensure that Al's sister Hassina gets to the Kabul Airport to board a plane for Turkey. Note: Because of the seriousness of the subject, this episode was taped without a studio audience.
| 15 | 2 | "Repo / Wapas Geri" | Mark Cendrowski | Teleplay by : Fahim Anwar & Bobby Telatovich; Story by : Anthony Del Broccolo & Andy Gordon | October 14, 2021 | T12.17355 | 4.54 |
Needing money to help his sister get to the USA from Turkey, Al joins Riley in the car repossession business. Al soon quits due to the danger, but Riley seems to enjoy the adrenaline rush. Riley's therapist soon tells him that he is using the repo job as a way to avoid his feelings about the fall of Afghanistan.
| 16 | 3 | "Mo / Masoud" | Mark Cendrowski | Teleplay by : Emily Ann Brandstetter & Maria Ferrari & Chuck Lorre; Story by : Fahim Anwar & Dave Goetsch & Ursula Taherian | October 21, 2021 | T12.17352 | 4.39 |
Al wants to find a bachelor for his sister to move her to the states. Riley and Freddy have a bowling match.
| 17 | 4 | "Panic / Tars" | Mark Cendrowski | Teleplay by : Dave Goetsch & Andy Gordon & Habib Zahori; Story by : Miriam Arghandiwal & Anthony Del Broccolo & Chuck Lorre | October 28, 2021 | T12.17351 | 5.07 |
Al begins having panic attacks resulting in being told to go to therapy.
| 18 | 5 | "Date / Didar" | Mark Cendrowski | Teleplay by : Anthony Del Broccolo & Ursula Taherian; Story by : Fahim Anwar & Bobby Telatovich | November 4, 2021 | T12.17356 | 4.83 |
Al and Ariana begin dating. Hazel gets grounded for getting caught cheating at school while trying to get a good grade without doing a lot of work.
| 19 | 6 | "Veterans Day / Roz-e Sarbaz" | Mark Cendrowski | Teleplay by : Emily Ann Brandstetter & Bobby Telatovich; Story by : Maria Ferrari & Chuck Tatham | November 11, 2021 | T12.17357 | 4.69 |
Riley, Hazel, and Al spend the day with old friends as they celebrate Veterans Day.
| 20 | 7 | "College / Pohantoon" | Mark Cendrowski | Teleplay by : Maria Ferrari & Andy Gordon & Habib Zahori; Story by : Dave Goetsch & Chuck Lorre & Jeff Silverstein | November 18, 2021 | T12.17353 | 4.72 |
Al struggles with his college class resulting in Riley speaking with the professor. Art learns Lois used to be married to a professional star.
| 21 | 8 | "Wisdom / Hikmat" | Mark Cendrowski | Teleplay by : Fahim Anwar & Anthony Del Broccolo & Andy Gordon; Story by : Dave Goetsch & Chuck Lorre & Habib Zahori | December 2, 2021 | T12.17358 | 4.59 |
| 22 | 9 | "Christmas / Krismis" | Mark Cendrowski | Teleplay by : Emily Ann Brandstetter & Ursula Taherian & Bobby Telatovich; Story by : Anthony Del Broccolo & Chuck Tatham & Habib Zahori | December 9, 2021 | T12.17359 | 5.00 |
| 23 | 10 | "Professor / Ustad" | Mark Cendrowski | Teleplay by : Fahim Anwar & Dave Goetsch & Chuck Tatham; Story by : Anthony Del Broccolo & Maria Ferrari & Andy Gordon | January 6, 2022 | T12.17360 | 5.47 |
| 24 | 11 | "Punch / Musht" | Mark Cendrowski | Teleplay by : Andy Gordon & Chuck Tatham & Habib Zahori; Story by : Chuck Lorre & Ursula Taherian & Bobby Telatovich | January 13, 2022 | T12.17361 | 5.48 |
When Hazel gets suspended for punching Danny at school for calling Al a terrorist, Riley and Vanessa fight on how to handle the situation.
| 25 | 12 | "Poker / Pokar" | Nikki Lorre | Teleplay by : Emily Ann Brandstetter & Anthony Del Broccolo; Story by : Andy Gordon & Chuck Lorre & Bobby Telatovich | January 20, 2022 | T12.17362 | 5.44 |
| 26 | 13 | "Hunt / Shikar" | Nikki Lorre | Teleplay by : Fahim Anwar & Dave Goetsch & Ursula Taherian; Story by : Joshua Keller Katz & Chuck Tatham & Bobby Telatovich | January 27, 2022 | T12.17363 | 5.57 |
| 27 | 14 | "Kiss / Maach" | Nikki Lorre | Teleplay by : Dave Goetsch & Andy Gordon & Chuck Tatham; Story by : Fahim Anwar & Chuck Lorre & Ursula Taherian | February 24, 2022 | T12.17365 | 5.03 |
| 28 | 15 | "Tattoo / Khaal" | Nikki Lorre | Teleplay by : Anthony Del Broccolo & Maria Ferrari & Habib Zahori; Story by : Emily Ann Brandstetter & Andy Gordon & Chuck Lorre | March 3, 2022 | T12.17364 | 4.01 |
| 29 | 16 | "Gout / Nikres" | Nikki Lorre | Teleplay by : Maria Ferrari & Chuck Lorre & Habib Zahori; Story by : Emily Ann Brandstetter & Anthony Del Broccolo & Andy Gordon | March 10, 2022 | T12.17366 | 5.14 |
| 30 | 17 | "Virgin / Bakr" | Nikki Lorre | Teleplay by : Dave Goetsch & Andy Gordon & Habib Zahori; Story by : Reza Aslan & Maria Ferrari & Chuck Lorre | March 31, 2022 | T12.17367 | 5.02 |
| 31 | 18 | "Divorce / Talaq" | Nikki Lorre | Teleplay by : Fahim Anwar & Anthony Del Broccolo & Maria Ferrari; Story by : Andy Gordon & Chuck Tatham & Habib Zahori | April 14, 2022 | T12.17368 | 4.91 |
| 32 | 19 | "Guilt / Gunah" | Nikki Lorre | Teleplay by : Dave Goetsch & Chuck Tatham & Bobby Telatovich; Story by : Jeff Silverstein & Ursula Taherian & Habib Zahori | April 21, 2022 | T12.17369 | 5.19 |
| 33 | 20 | "Sock / Jeraab" | Nikki Lorre | Teleplay by : Fahim Anwar & Anthony Del Broccolo & Maria Ferrari; Story by : Dave Goetsch & Ursula Taherian & Habib Zahori | April 28, 2022 | T12.17370 | 4.62 |
| 34 | 21 | "Desire / Khwast" | Mark Cendrowski | Teleplay by : Dave Goetsch & Andy Gordon & Chuck Lorre; Story by : Fahim Anwar & Maria Ferrari & Chuck Tatham | May 12, 2022 | T12.17371 | 4.91 |
| 35 | 22 | "Chaos / Aashob" | Mark Cendrowski | Teleplay by : Maria Ferrari & Andy Gordon & Chuck Tatham; Story by : Fahim Anwar & Ursula Taherian & Habib Zahori | May 19, 2022 | T12.17372 | 4.79 |

== Production ==
=== Development and casting ===
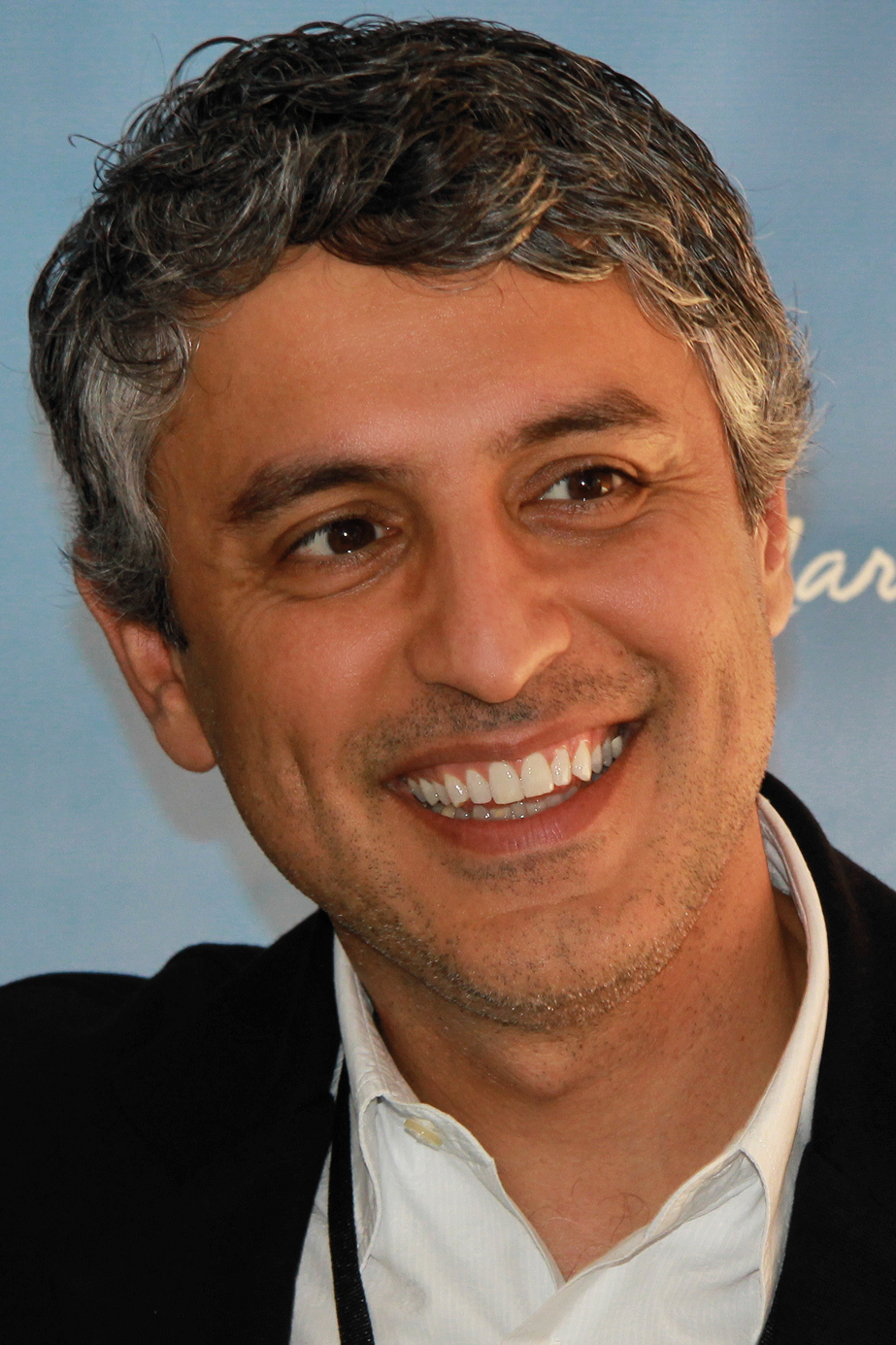
Executive producer Reza Aslan

On October 10, 2019, it was reported that a television pilot titled United States of Al from Chuck Lorre, David Goetsch, and Maria Ferrari had received a large production commitment from CBS. In December, Adhir Kalyan and Parker Young were cast as the leading characters on the show, with Dean Norris, Kelli Goss, and Elizabeth Alderfer joining the series the following year, and Farrah Mackenzie being cast soon after. On joining the comedy series after his main role in the drama series Breaking Bad, Norris explained that he had met Lorre while working on six episodes for The Big Bang Theory. In November 2020, on Veterans Day, CBS gave the project a series order, scheduling it to premiere on April 1, 2021, for the 2020–21 United States network television season. On creating the show, executive producer Reza Aslan said:

"The dream for us has always been to get a Muslim protagonist on network television, someone who could really reframe the perceptions of so many Americans about Muslims or people from this broad region. We knew that Dave and Maria would be the perfect shepherds for this and that Chuck would be the kind of person who could take very heavy topics like immigration xenophobia and transform them into something entertaining and palatable, but without necessarily taking the edge away."

In May 2021, Brian Thomas Smith was cast in the first recurring role confirmed for the series. That same month, Deadline Hollywood predicted that the chances of the show being renewed depended on the status of B Positive, another CBS series from Lorre. On May 15, 2021, CBS renewed both B Positive and United States of Al for second and final seasons. In June, it was announced that Rachel Bay Jones would star in a recurring role. In October, it was reported that Azita Ghanizada had been promoted to recurring. The second season premiered on October 7, 2021. On May 11, 2022, CBS canceled the series after two seasons.

=== Filming ===
United States of Al was filmed at Warner Bros. Studios in Burbank, California, but it is set in Columbus, Ohio.

== Reception ==
=== Critical response ===
On review aggregator Rotten Tomatoes, the series holds an approval rating of 31% based on 13 reviews, with an average rating of 4.4/10. The website's critical consensus states, "United States of Al is well-meaning in its ambitions, but its limp humor and the one-dimensionality of its titular character proves that the road to dud sitcom can be paved with good intentions." On Metacritic, it has a weighted average score of 52 out of 100, based on 11 critics, indicating "mixed or average reviews".

In initial contemporary reviews, United States of Al received mostly negative feedback. However, the Los Angeles Times journalist Lorraine Ali examined reviews from several critics, and summarized them as illustrating "the minefield that exists around good-intentioned efforts to diversify scripted television" due to their ignoring of the cultural representation of the main character and the show's attempts to diversify television, calling the reviews "damaging to future representations of Muslims".

Daniel Fienberg, writing for The Hollywood Reporter, shared his dislike for "the writers' choices for Al", referring to it as "a bad mixture". From TV Guide, Diane Gordon gave the show only 2 out of 5 stars; her criticism leaned toward the show's fish out of water attempts at comedy she found to be "cheap and half-hearted". Roxana Hadadi from RogerEbert.com criticized the series and its creators for using antiquated tropes while attempting to be comedic. Caroline Framke from Variety also gave remarks to the show's writing, stating that the show "works so hard to make its Afghan protagonist palatable that it neglects to give him any complexity."

Afghan journalist Ali Latifi shared his criticism of the show in an op-ed for Business Insider and said "it's all flat characters, and cheap, uninspired jokes." While giving praise to Lorre's television series The Big Bang Theory, he also shared a quote from a conversation with Afghan-American social rights activist Mariam Wardak, who he quoted as saying "rather than showing Afghan interpreters as brave men who are putting their lives on the line and are risking being ostracized in their community, we have a short, scrawny awkward brown man standing next to this GI Joe." The Afghan-American Foundation criticized the show's casting of the lead role while they also applauded the show's inclusion of Afghan-American writers as "commendable and unprecedented," hoping the show leads to further thoughtful representations of Afghan-Americans.

=== Ratings ===
==== Overall ====
Viewership and ratings per season of United States of Al
| Season | Timeslot (ET) | Episodes | First aired | | Last aired | | TV season | Viewership rank | Avg. viewers (millions) | Avg. 18–49 rating |
| Season | Timeslot (ET) | Episodes | Date | Viewers (millions) | Date | Viewers (millions) | TV season | Viewership rank | Avg. viewers (millions) | Avg. 18–49 rating |
|---|---|---|---|---|---|---|---|---|---|---|
| 1 | Thursday 8:30 pm (Note: The fifteenth episode of the second season aired out of its regular timeslot at Thursday 9:30 pm.) | 13 | April 1, 2021 | 5.14 | June 24, 2021 | 3.83 | 2020–21 | 43 | 5.94 | 0.7 |
| 2 | Thursday 8:30 pm | 22 | October 7, 2021 | 4.84 | May 19, 2022 | 4.79 | 2021–22 | 41 | 5.84 | 0.6 |

==== Season 1 ====
Viewership and ratings per episode of United States of Al
| No. | Title | Air date | Rating (18–49) | Viewers (millions) | DVR (18–49) | DVR viewers (millions) | Total (18–49) | Total viewers (millions) | Ref. |
|---|---|---|---|---|---|---|---|---|---|
| 1 | "Pilot" | April 1, 2021 | 0.6 | 5.31 | 0.1 | 0.71 | 0.7 | 6.02 | (Note: Live +7 ratings were not available, so Live +3 ratings have been used instead.) |
| 2 | "Repair / Tarmim" | April 8, 2021 | 0.6 | 5.38 | 0.1 | 0.93 | 0.8 | 6.31 | |
| 3 | "Shorts / Neykar" | April 15, 2021 | 0.6 | 5.45 | —N/a | —N/a | —N/a | —N/a | |
| 4 | "Spinach / Sabz" | April 22, 2021 | 0.6 | 5.37 | 0.2 | 0.86 | 0.7 | 6.23 | |
| 5 | "Homesick / Deghyat" | April 29, 2021 | 0.5 | 5.25 | 0.1 | 0.78 | 0.6 | 6.03 | |
| 6 | "Fundraiser / Baspana Towlawal" | May 6, 2021 | 0.5 | 4.80 | 0.1 | 0.80 | 0.5 | 5.60 | |
| 7 | "Car / Motar" | May 13, 2021 | 0.6 | 5.23 | 0.2 | 0.85 | 0.7 | 6.08 | |
| 8 | "Roht / Sweet Bread" | May 20, 2021 | 0.5 | 4.05 | 0.1 | 0.84 | 0.6 | 4.89 | |
| 9 | "Birthday / Kaleeza" | May 27, 2021 | 0.4 | 4.06 | 0.1 | 0.80 | 0.6 | 4.86 | |
| 10 | "Matchmaker / Roybar" | June 3, 2021 | 0.5 | 3.95 | 0.1 | 0.88 | 0.6 | 4.83 | |
| 11 | "Blackout / Parchawi" | June 10, 2021 | 0.5 | 3.92 | 0.1 | 0.83 | 0.6 | 4.74 | |
| 12 | "Dog / Spai" | June 17, 2021 | 0.4 | 4.05 | 0.1 | 0.72 | 0.6 | 4.77 | |
| 13 | "Help / Komak" | June 24, 2021 | 0.4 | 3.83 | 0.1 | 0.70 | 0.5 | 4.53 | |

==== Season 2 ====
Viewership and ratings per episode of United States of Al
| No. | Title | Air date | Rating (18–49) | Viewers (millions) | DVR (18–49) | DVR viewers (millions) | Total (18–49) | Total viewers (millions) | Ref. |
|---|---|---|---|---|---|---|---|---|---|
| 1 | "Promises / Wadaha" | October 7, 2021 | 0.5 | 4.84 | TBD | TBD | TBD | TBD | |
| 2 | "Repo / Wapas Geri" | October 14, 2021 | 0.5 | 4.54 | 0.1 | 0.90 | 0.6 | 5.44 | |
| 3 | "Mo / Masoud" | October 21, 2021 | 0.5 | 4.39 | 0.1 | 0.88 | 0.6 | 5.27 | |
| 4 | "Panic / Tars" | October 28, 2021 | 0.5 | 5.07 | TBD | TBD | TBD | TBD | |
| 5 | "Date / Didar" | November 4, 2021 | 0.5 | 4.83 | TBD | TBD | TBD | TBD | |
| 6 | "Veterans Day / Roz-e Sarbaz" | November 11, 2021 | 0.4 | 4.69 | TBD | TBD | TBD | TBD | |
| 7 | "College / Pohantoon" | November 18, 2021 | 0.5 | 4.72 | 0.1 | 0.88 | 0.6 | 5.60 | |
| 8 | "Wisdom / Hikmat" | December 2, 2021 | 0.5 | 4.59 | 0.1 | 1.07 | 0.6 | 5.66 | |
| 9 | "Christmas / Krismis" | December 9, 2021 | 0.5 | 5.00 | 0.1 | 1.00 | 0.6 | 6.00 | |
| 10 | "Professor / Ustad" | January 6, 2022 | 0.5 | 5.47 | TBD | TBD | TBD | TBD | |
| 11 | "Punch / Musht" | January 13, 2022 | 0.5 | 5.48 | TBD | TBD | TBD | TBD | |
| 12 | "Poker / Pokar" | January 20, 2022 | 0.5 | 5.44 | TBD | TBD | TBD | TBD | |
| 13 | "Hunt / Shikar" | January 27, 2022 | 0.5 | 5.57 | TBD | TBD | TBD | TBD | |
| 14 | "Kiss / Maach" | February 24, 2022 | 0.5 | 5.03 | TBD | TBD | TBD | TBD | |
| 15 | "Tattoo / Khaal" | March 3, 2022 | 0.3 | 4.01 | TBD | TBD | TBD | TBD | |
| 16 | "Gout / Nikres" | March 10, 2022 | 0.5 | 5.14 | TBD | TBD | TBD | TBD | |
| 17 | "Virgin / Bakr" | March 31, 2022 | 0.4 | 5.02 | TBD | TBD | TBD | TBD | |
| 18 | "Divorce / Talaq" | April 14, 2022 | 0.5 | 4.91 | TBD | TBD | TBD | TBD | |
| 19 | "Guilt / Gunah" | April 21, 2022 | 0.5 | 5.19 | TBD | TBD | TBD | TBD | |
| 20 | "Sock / Jeraab" | April 28, 2022 | 0.4 | 4.62 | TBD | TBD | TBD | TBD | |
| 21 | "Desire / Khwast" | May 12, 2022 | 0.5 | 4.91 | TBD | TBD | TBD | TBD | |
| 22 | "Chaos / Aashob" | May 19, 2022 | 0.5 | 4.79 | TBD | TBD | TBD | TBD | |

United States of Al : U.S. viewers per episode (millions)

| Season | Episode number | | | | | | | | | | | | | | | | | | | | | |
| Season | 1 | 2 | 3 | 4 | 5 | 6 | 7 | 8 | 9 | 10 | 11 | 12 | 13 | 14 | 15 | 16 | 17 | 18 | 19 | 20 | 21 | 22 |
|---|---|---|---|---|---|---|---|---|---|---|---|---|---|---|---|---|---|---|---|---|---|---|
| 1 | 5.31 | 5.38 | 5.45 | 5.37 | 5.25 | 4.80 | 5.23 | 4.05 | 4.06 | 3.95 | 3.92 | 4.05 | 3.83 | – | | | | | | | | |
| 2 | 4.84 | 4.54 | 4.39 | 5.07 | 4.83 | 4.69 | 4.72 | 4.59 | 5.00 | 5.47 | 5.48 | 5.44 | 5.57 | 5.03 | 4.01 | 5.14 | 5.02 | 4.91 | 5.19 | 4.62 | 4.91 | 4.79 |

Audience measurement performed by Nielsen Media Research
