= There is no god but God =

There is no god but God may refer to:

- The beginning of the shahada, the Muslim profession of faith
- Tawhid, the Muslim concept of the oneness and uniqueness of God
- No God but God: The Origins, Evolution, and Future of Islam, a 2005 book about Islam by Reza Aslan
- A Bill Kenny song sung by Elvis Presley on the album He Touched Me (album)
