= Velton Ray Bunch =

American composer

- Born: January 22, 1948 (age 78); Goldsboro, North Carolina, US
- Occupation: Television/film musical score composer
- Years active: 1980–present
- Known for: Work on various TV series, including Quantum Leap, JAG, Walker, Texas Ranger, and Star Trek: Enterprise
- Awards: 3 Emmy Award nominations, 1 win (2004) for Star Trek: Enterprise

Velton Ray Bunch (born January 22, 1948 in Goldsboro, North Carolina) is a film and television composer. Sometimes credited as Ray Bunch. Bunch has been nominated for an Emmy three times for his work, and won the fourth time for his score to the Star Trek: Enterprise episode "Similitude".

== Career ==
Bunch has worked on dozens of television series and TV movies, as well as occasional film composition (including additional, uncredited, scoring on the film version of Lost in Space). He studied and worked under famous television composer Mike Post (Magnum, PI, The Rockford Files, Quantum Leap, Hill Street Blues, much more) in various capacities, including ghostwriting for many popular series Post worked on, and taking over as main composer for Post on various series.

Bunch's credits include the NBC television series Quantum Leap, theme music for NBC's The Pretender (Emmy Nomination, 2000), Flight 93, a biopic based on Senator John McCain's book Faith of My Fathers, and the Action Pack theme music.

== Personal life ==
Bunch resides in North Hollywood, California.

== Partial filmography ==
Year	Title	Notes
1980	Magnum, P.I.	Composer, entire series
1983	J.J. Starbuck	Episode: "Rag Doll"
1989–93	Quantum Leap	Composer, 83 episodes
1994	Walker, Texas Ranger	13 episodes (season 2)
1995	Crowfoot	TV movie
1995	JAG	6 episodes (season 1)
1996	The Outer Limits	Episode: "Afterlife"
1996–97	Mr. & Mrs. Smith	Entire series
1998	Blockbuster Entertainment Awards	TV special
1999	Blue Valley Songbird	TV movie
2000	The Pretender	10 episodes
2000–01	Nash Bridges	6 episodes and new opening/closing theme
2002–05	Star Trek: Enterprise	Composer, 13 episodes
2004	Jack	Feature film, composer, score
2005	Faith of My Fathers	TV Movie
2011	Silent Witness	TV movie
2015	Dolly Parton's Coat of Many Colors	TV movie
2016	Dolly Parton's Christmas of Many Colors: Circle of Love	TV movie

== Awards ==
Primetime Emmy Awards
Year	Award	Credit	Result	Ref.
1993	Outstanding Music Composition for a Series (Dramatic Underscore)	Quantum Leap, episode "Lee Harvey Oswald, Part I"	Nominated	
2000	Outstanding Main Title Theme Music (with Mark Leggett)	The Pretender	Nominated	
2001	Outstanding Music Composition for a Miniseries, Movie or a Special (Dramatic Underscore)	Papa's Angels	Nominated	
2004	Outstanding Music Composition for a Series (Dramatic Underscore)	Star Trek: Enterprise, episode "Similitude"	Won	
