= Maysie Hoy =

Film editor

- Born: Vancouver
- Occupation: Film editor
- Years active: 1992–present
- Known for: Dolly Parton's Coat of Many Colors (2015); A Jazzman's Blues (2023)
- Relatives: William Hoy (brother)

Maysie Hoy is a film editor who has been active since the early 1990s. She is a long-time collaborator with director Tyler Perry, having edited 16 films for him. She was nominated twice for an American Cinema Editors award, and in 2025, she received their Career Achievement Award. Hoy is also on the Board of Directors of both the Motion Picture Editors Guild and American Cinema Editors.

Hoy has a brother, William Hoy, who is also a film editor.

== Background ==
Maysie Hoy and her brother William Hoy were born in Vancouver to Chinese parents. She studied improvisational theatre in San Francisco and moved back to Vancouver, where she founded the improvisational company The Good Will Store and became its artistic director. She was cast in director Robert Altman's film McCabe and Mrs. Miller (1971), and after filming was completed, she moved to Los Angeles. She worked under Altman for eight years, doing research, costume, and production design. She also appeared in several other of Altman's films: California Split (1974), Nashville (1975), and 3 Women (1977). She became an editing apprentice on Altman's Buffalo Bill and the Indians (1976).

While working in editing, she enrolled in the American Film Institute's Directing Workshop for Women and completed the program in 1977. During the 1980s, she took eight years off to raise her two children while her husband worked as gaffer. When he was out of work, she sought work and became first assistant film editor for Major League (1989). The editing led to more work, for the film The Player (1992). One of her first solo editing credits was the film The Joy Luck Club (1993).

From the late 2000s onward, she frequently edited Tyler Perry's films.

== Credits ==
Hoy's editing credits for film
Year	Title	Notes	Ref.
1992	Bank Robber		
1993	The Joy Luck Club		
1994	There Goes My Baby	Edited with Danford B. Greene	
1995	Smoke		
1995	Mrs. Munck		
1996	Freeway		
1997	Love Jones		
1998	What Dreams May Come	Edited with David Brenner	
1999	Life Tastes Good		
1999	Crazy in Alabama	Edited with Robert C. Jones	
2003	Chasing Papi		
2005	Christmas in the Clouds	Edited with Alan Baumgarten	
2005	Smile		
2006	The Celestine Prophecy		
2006	Broken Bridges		
2007	Daddy's Little Girls		
2007	Why Did I Get Married?		
2008	Meet the Browns		
2008	The Family That Preys		
2009	Madea Goes to Jail		
2009	I Can Do Bad All by Myself		
2010	Why Did I Get Married Too?		
2010	For Colored Girls		
2011	Madea's Big Happy Family		
2012	Good Deeds		
2012	Madea's Witness Protection		
2013	Temptation: Confessions of a Marriage Counselor		
2013	A Madea Christmas		
2014	The Single Moms Club		
2015	Spare Parts		
2017	Love Beats Rhymes	Edited with Bruce Cannon	
2018	Alex & Me		
2019	Breakthrough		
2020	Mighty Oak	Edited with Matt Michael	
2021	Afterlife of the Party		
2022	A Jazzman's Blues		
2023	The Other Zoey		
2024	The Six Triple Eight		
2025	Ruth & Boaz		

Hoy's editing credits for television
Year(s)	Title	Notes	Ref.
1991	Boris and Natasha	TV movie	
2000	Freedom Song	TV movie	
2001	The Warden	TV movie	
2006	Time Bomb	TV movie; edited with Victor Du Bois	
2015	Dolly Parton's Coat of Many Colors	TV movie	
2016	Dolly Parton's Christmas of Many Colors: Circle of Love	TV movie	
2019	Dolly Parton's Heartstrings	TV series, 2 episodes	
2019	Same Time, Next Christmas	TV movie	

== Accolades ==
Hoy's accolades
Year	Film	Award	Ceremony	Result	Ref.
2015	Dolly Parton's Coat of Many Colors	American Cinema Editors Award for Best Edited Miniseries or Motion Picture for Television	January 29, 2016	Nominated	
2023	A Jazzman's Blues	American Cinema Editors Award for Best Edited Miniseries or Motion Picture for Television	March 5, 2023	Nominated	
2025		American Cinema Editors Career Achievement Award	March 14, 2025	Honored	
