= Dolly Parton's Christmas of Many Colors: Circle of Love =

2016 American television drama film

- Promotional poster
- Genre: Drama
- Screenplay by: Pamela K. Long
- Directed by: Stephen Herek
- Starring: Jennifer Nettles; Ricky Schroder; Alyvia Alyn Lind; Gerald McRaney; Dolly Parton
- Narrated by: Dolly Parton
- Composers: Velton Ray Bunch; Mark Leggett
- Country of origin: United States
- Original language: English

Production
- Executive producers: Pamela K. Long; Sam Haskell; Dolly Parton
- Producers: Hudson Hickman; Stephanie Johnson
- Cinematography: Brian J. Reynolds
- Editor: Maysie Hoy
- Running time: 120 minutes
- Production companies: Magnolia Hill Entertainment; DP Productions; Warner Bros. Television

Original release
- Network: NBC
- Release: November 30, 2016

Related
- Dolly Parton's Coat of Many Colors

Dolly Parton's Christmas of Many Colors: Circle of Love is a 2016 American made-for-television drama film based on the life of Dolly Parton, written by Pamela K. Long and directed by Stephen Herek. The film is a sequel to Coat of Many Colors and premiered on NBC on November 30, 2016.

== Plot ==
Family patriarch Lee Parton makes sacrifices to have enough money to buy his wife the wedding ring he could never afford. The children also sacrifice their own Christmas presents to give their mother this special gift. Dolly's Uncle Billy helps her begin to see that her voice and talent might extend beyond rural Tennessee. Various crisis situations, some life-threatening, make the family's Christmas a challenge.

== Cast ==
- Alyvia Alyn Lind as Dolly Parton
- Jennifer Nettles as Avie Lee Parton, the devout matriarch of the Partons
- Ricky Schroder as Robert Lee Parton, the hard-working patriarch of the Partons
- Gerald McRaney as Rev. Jake Owens, Avie Lee's father and a preacher
- Kelli Berglund as Willadeene Parton, the eldest sister of Dolly, who also strives to protect her family and siblings but her insecurities make her struggle sometimes and often feels alone.
- Stella Parton as Corla Bass, owner of the town market and a gossip
- Dolly Parton as the Painted Lady, a prostitute who befriends Dolly
- Hannah Nordberg as Judy Ogle, Dolly's schoolmate
- Mary Lane Haskell as Miss Moody, the school teacher of Dolly
- Forrest Deal as Rudy Sanders, former school bully
- Christopher Ryan Lewis as Claude Sanders, Rudy and Gloria's brother
- Hannah Goergen as Cassie Parton
- Farrah Mackenzie as Stella Parton, Dolly's younger sister
- Parker Sack as David Parton, Dolly's oldest brother
- Dylan Rowen as Denver Parton, Dolly's second-oldest brother
- Blane Crockarell as Bobby Parton, Dolly's younger brother
- Cameron Jones as Uncle Billy, a musician trying to help Dolly become a star and the brother of Dolly's mother.

== Production ==
=== Filming ===
Christmas of Many Colors was filmed in Covington, and Conyers, Georgia, and Sevier County, Tennessee, the latter at Dollywood for introductory and closing scenes from Dolly Parton. Filming took place during summer 2016.

== Reception ==
=== Ratings ===
In its initial November 30, 2016 broadcast, Christmas of Many Colors was seen by 11.53 million viewers and received a 1.7/6 rating/share in the 18-49 age demographic.

=== Accolades ===
Christmas of Many Colors was nominated for Outstanding Television Movie at the 69th Primetime Emmy Awards, which aired September 17, 2017. It also was awarded the Epiphany Prize® for Inspiring Television at the 2017 MovieGuide Awards.
