= American Cinema Editors Awards 2016 =

66th ACE Eddie Awards
- Presented by: American Cinema Editors
- Date: January 29, 2016
- Site: The Beverly Hilton, Beverly Hills, California

Highlights
- Best Film: Drama: Mad Max: Fury Road
- Best Film: Comedy: The Big Short

The 66th American Cinema Editors Eddie Awards were presented on January 29, 2016 at the Beverly Hilton Hotel, honoring the best editors in films and television.

== Winners and nominees ==
=== Film ===
Best Edited Feature Film – Dramatic:

Margaret Sixel – Mad Max: Fury Road

- Pietro Scalia – The Martian
- Stephen Mirrione – The Revenant
- Joe Walker – Sicario
- Maryann Brandon and Mary Jo Markey– Star Wars: The Force Awakens

Best Edited Feature Film – Comedy or Musical:

Hank Corwin – The Big Short

- Dan Lebental and Colby Parker, Jr. – Ant-Man
- Alan Baumgarten, Jay Cassidy, Tom Cross and Christopher Tellefsen – Joy
- David Trachtenberg – Me and Earl and the Dying Girl
- William Kerr and Paul Zucker – Trainwreck

Best Edited Animated Feature Film:

Kevin Nolting – Inside Out

- Garret Elkins – Anomalisa
- Stephen Schaffer – The Good Dinosaur

Best Edited Documentary Feature:

Chris King – Amy

- Joe Beshenkovsky and Brett Morgen – Kurt Cobain: Montage of Heck
- Andy Grieve – Going Clear: Scientology and the Prison of Belief
- Greg Finton, Brad Fuller and Brian Johnson – He Named Me Malala
- Claire Scanlon – The Wrecking Crew

=== Television ===
Best Edited Half-Hour Series for Television:

Nick Paley – Inside Amy Schumer: "12 Angry Men Inside Amy Schumer"

- Brian Merken – Silicon Valley: "Two Days of the Condor"
- Gary Dollner – Veep: "Election Night"

Best Edited One Hour Series for Commercial Television:

Tom Wilson – Mad Men: "Person to Person"

- Kelley Dixon – Better Call Saul: "Five-O"
- Skip Macdonald – Better Call Saul: "Uno"
- Skip Macdonald and Curtis Thurber – Fargo: "Did You Do This? No, You Did It!"
- Scott Vickrey – The Good Wife: "Restraint"

Best Edited One Hour Series for Non-Commercial Television:

Lisa Bromwell – House of Cards: "Chapter 39"

- Katie Weiland – Game of Thrones: "The Dance of Dragons"
- Tim Porter – Game of Thrones: "Hardhome"
- Harvey Rosenstock – Homeland: "The Tradition of Hospitality"
- Steven Soderbergh – The Knick: "Wonderful Surprises"

Best Edited Mini-Series or Motion Picture for Television:

Brian A. Kates – Bessie

- Maysie Hoy – Dolly Parton's Coat of Many Colors
- Jeffrey M. Werner – Orange Is the New Black: '"Trust No Bitch"

Best Edited Documentary for Television:

Richard Hankin, Zac Stuart-Pontier, Caitlyn Greene, Shelby Siegel – The Jinx: The Life and Deaths of Robert Durst: "Chapter 1: A Body in the Bay"

- Joshua L. Pearson – Keith Richards: Under the Influence
- Chris A. Peterson – The Seventies: "The United States vs. Nixon"

Best Edited Non-Scripted Series

Hunter Gross – Anthony Bourdain: Parts Unknown: "Bay Area"

- Josh Earl and Ben Bulatao – Deadliest Catch: "Zero Hour"
- Eric Driscoll, Nik Jamgocyan, Chris Kirkpatrick, David Michael Maurer, Greg McDonald, Marcus Miller and Alexandria Scott – Whale Wars: "The Darkest Hour"
