= Alyvia Alyn Lind =

American actress (born 2007)

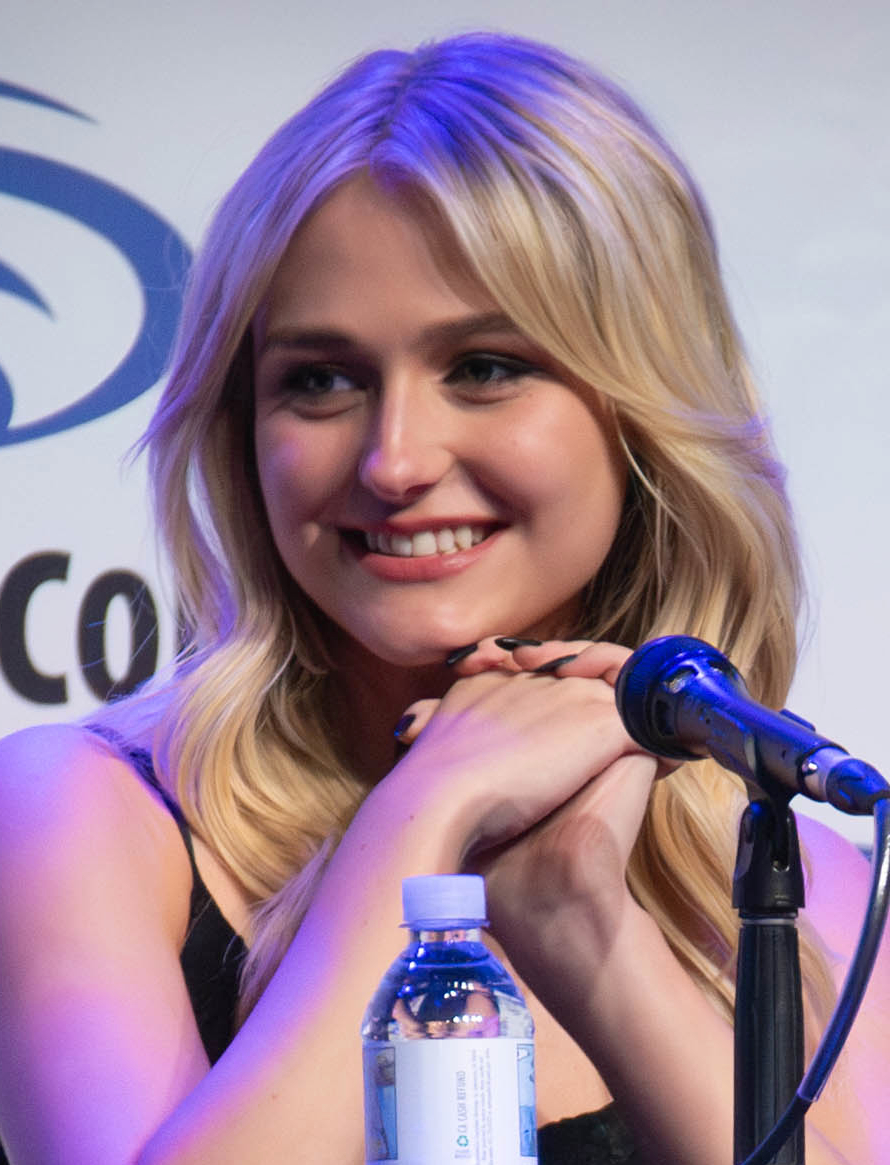
- Lind in 2024
- Born: July 27, 2007 (age 19)
- Occupation: Actress
- Years active: 2011–present
- Mother: Barbara Alyn Woods
- Relatives: Natalie Alyn Lind (sister); Emily Alyn Lind (sister)

Alyvia Alyn Lind (born July 27, 2007) is an American actress. She played the roles of Faith Newman in The Young and the Restless (2011–2021), as 9-year-old Dolly Parton in Dolly Parton's Coat of Many Colors (2015) and Dolly Parton's Christmas of Many Colors: Circle of Love (2016), Angelica Green in Daybreak (2019), Lexy Cross in Chucky (2021–2024), and Leila in Wayward (2025).

== Early life and education ==
Alyvia Alyn Lind was born July 27, 2007, the youngest daughter of actress Barbara Alyn Woods and producer John Lind. She has two older sisters, Natalie Alyn Lind and Emily Alyn Lind, who are also actresses.

== Career ==
Lind made her feature film debut in 2013 in the film Dark Skies. From 2011 to early 2021, she played Faith Newman in the television daytime soap opera The Young and the Restless. She has had recurring roles as young Amanda Clarke, in the television series Revenge, and played Grace in Transparent. In 2014, she appeared as Louise "Lou" Friedman in the feature movie Blended.

Between 2015 and 2016, she played a young Dolly Parton in the TV films Dolly Parton's Coat of Many Colors, and Christmas of Many Colors: Circle of Love. In 2016, Lind starred in the Amazon Studios special An American Girl Story – Maryellen 1955: Extraordinary Christmas, playing the role of American Girl character Maryellen Larkin. In 2019, she appeared in the Hulu series Future Man. Lind was cast in the main role of Angelica Green in the Netflix comedy-drama series Daybreak.

In 2019, she played Autumn Snyder in Walk. Ride. Rodeo.. In 2021, she appeared as Casey in the film Masquerade.

From 2021 to 2024, Lind starred as Lexy Cross in Chucky. In 2024, she appeared in the fantasy series The Spiderwick Chronicles, based on the book series of the same name by Tony DiTerlizzi and Holly Black.

In September 2025, Lind appeared alongside Toni Collette in the Netflix series Wayward as Leila.

== Filmography ==
=== Television ===
| Year | Title | Role | Notes | Ref. |
|---|---|---|---|---|
| 2011–2021 | The Young and the Restless | Faith Newman | Recurring role; 262 episodes | |
| 2012–2015 | Revenge | Young Amanda Clarke | Recurring role; 9 episodes (seasons 2 & 4) | |
| 2012–2014 | See Dad Run | Charlotte | Recurring role; 6 episodes | |
| 2013 | NCIS | Emma Daly | Episode: "Homesick" | |
| 2014–2015 | Transparent | Grace | Recurring role; 7 episodes (seasons 1–2) | |
| 2015–2016 | Masters of Sex | Jenny Masters | Recurring role; 5 episodes (seasons 3–4) | |
| 2015 | A Deadly Adoption | Sully Benson | Television film | |
| 2015 | Gamer's Guide to Pretty Much Everything | Tina | Episode: "Puddin' Party" | |
| 2015 | Dolly Parton's Coat of Many Colors | Dolly Parton | Television film | |
| 2016 | Teachers | Annika | Episode: "Hot Lunch" | |
| 2016 | Dolly Parton's Christmas of Many Colors: Circle of Love | Dolly Parton | Television film | |
| 2018 | 9-1-1 | Lily | Episode: "Pilot" | |
| 2018 | Alexa & Katie | Sasha | Episode: "Tryouts and Latte Doubts" | |
| 2019 | Future Man | Lugnut | Recurring role; 6 episodes (season 2) | |
| 2019 | Daybreak | Angelica Green | Main role; 10 episodes | |
| 2021–2024 | Chucky | Lexy Cross | Main role; 24 episodes | |
| 2024 | The Spiderwick Chronicles | Calliope | Recurring role; 7 episodes | |
| 2025 | Wayward | Leila | Miniseries; 8 episodes | |
| TBA | Cry Wolf | Mia | Upcoming miniseries | |

=== Film ===
| Year | Title | Role | Notes | Ref. |
|---|---|---|---|---|
| 2013 | Dark Skies | Young Daughter | | |
| 2014 | Blended | Louise "Lou" Friedman | | |
| 2014 | Mockingbird | Megan | | |
| 2015 | A Date to Die For | Kali Armstrong | | |
| 2015 | Fire Twister | Amber | | |
| 2015 | Shangri-La Suite | Lisa Marie Presley | | |
| 2015 | Have You Seen Charlie | Scarlet | Short film | |
| 2016 | An American Girl Story – Maryellen 1955: Extraordinary Christmas | Maryellen Larkin | Straight-to-video film | |
| 2017 | Remember Me | Little Maddy | Short film | |
| 2018 | Overboard | Olivia Sullivan | | |
| 2019 | Walk. Ride. Rodeo. | Autumn Snyder | | |
| 2021 | Masquerade | Casey | | |

== Awards and nominations ==
| Association | Year | Category | Work | Result | Ref. |
|---|---|---|---|---|---|
| Critics' Choice Television Awards | 2016 | Best Actress in a Limited Series or Television Movie | Dolly Parton's Coat of Many Colors | Nominated | |
| Daytime Emmy Awards | 2017 | Outstanding Younger Actress in a Drama Series | The Young and the Restless | Nominated | |
| Daytime Emmy Awards | 2021 | Outstanding Younger Performer in a Drama Series | The Young and the Restless | Nominated | |
| Daytime Emmy Awards | 2022 | Outstanding Younger Performer in a Drama Series | The Young and the Restless | Nominated | |
