= Gerald Downey =

American actor

- Born: October 1, 1970 (age 55); United States
- Education: Missouri State University (1994)
- Occupation: Actor
- Years active: 1998–present

Gerald Downey (born October 1, 1970) is an American actor. He is best known for playing the role of McSweeten in Leverage. Most recently, he has starred as the "Busch Guy" in a series of Anheuser-Busch's Busch commercials.

== Filmography ==
=== Films ===
Year	Title	Role	Notes
2000	Summertime's Calling Me	Robert	Short
2001	Macbeth: The Comedy	Donalbain	
2005	Partner(s)	Man in Sauna	
2006	Mud Show	Robert	TV movie
2007	Because I Said So	Cousin Dougy's Friend	
2007	Live Free or Die Hard	Hoover Agent	
2007	Evan Almighty	Staffer	
2008	Eagle Eye	Console Tech	
2005	Denial, Anger, Bargaining, Depression, Acceptance	Ben	Short
2009	Murder Squad	Agent Macfarlane	Short
2009	Broken Hart	Flower Delivery Guy	Short
2010	Open House	Seth	
2010	Sheltered	Joey	
2010	One Step Forward Two Steps Back	Fred	
2011	J. Edgar	FBI Agent	
2013	The Upside of Down	Adam	Short
2013	A Voice in the Dark	Mark Madsen	
2013	In Sickness and in Health	Evan	Short
2014	You're Not You	Bill	
2014	The Haircut	Buddy #1	Short
2014	Saving John Murphy	David Collins	Short
2015	Southbound	Daryl	
2016	An American Girl Story - Maryellen 1955: Extraordinary Christmas	Mr. Larkin	Direct-to-video
2016	Still Single	Ryan Steinke	TV Movie
2019	Flashout	Frank	
2019	Dolemite Is My Name	Bob Brooks	
2020	Birds of Prey and the Fantabulous Emancipation of One Harley Quinn	Judge (uncredited)	

=== Television ===
Year	Title	Role	Notes
2003	NCIS	Cmdr. Ray Trapp	1 episode
2003	Will & Grace	Clark	1 episode
2004	Frasier	Doctor	1 episode
2004	Summerland	Dr. Mike	2 episodes
2005	Joey	Mercedes Guy	1 episode
2005	The Suite Life of Zack & Cody	Reporter	1 episode
2006	Scrubs	Jimmy	1 episode
2006	Twins	Corey	1 episode
2006	Boston Legal	Joel Kohn	1 episode
2007	Samantha Who?	Paul	1 episode
2008–2012	Leverage	FBI Agent McSweeten	6 episodes
2008	Mad Men	Greg Harris	1 episode
2009	Surviving Suburbia	Carl	1 episode
2009	Criminal Minds	Officer Feder	1 episode
2009	Rita Rocks	Danny	5 episodes
2010	CSI: NY	Prof. William Aldicott	1 episode
2011	The Nine Lives of Chloe King	Detective Pike	2 episodes
2012	Castle	Lloyd Kurtzman	1 episode
2012	The Mentalist	Forest Ranger	1 episode
2012	Rizzoli & Isles	Alex Simmons / Morgue Tech	2 episodes
2012	It's Always Sunny in Philadelphia	Bill Larkin	1 episode
2013	NCIS: Los Angeles	Marine Captain CACO	1 episode
2013	Grey's Anatomy	Dr. Kenton Giles	1 episode
2014	Caper	Office Manager	1 episode
2014	Chop Shop	Slick Willy	1 episode
2014	The Young and the Restless	Dr. Ramsey	1 episode
2015	Hawaii Five-0	Bryan Wallace	1 episode
2015	Workaholics	Tom	2 episodes
2016	Just Add Magic	Clayton	1 episode
2016	Scorpion	Captain Braden	2 episodes
2016	General Hospital	Dr. Marsh	2 episodes
2017	Sweet/Vicious	Coach Howard	2 episodes
2017	Law & Order True Crime	Detective Boggs	1 episode
2018	The 5th Quarter	Bob O'Reilly	1 episode
2018	Unsolved: The Murders of Tupac and the Notorious B.I.G.	Guy Carson	1 episode
2018	Modern Family	Jim	1 episode
2019	Young Sheldon	Jim	1 episode
2021	Damsels	Ryan Steinke	
