= Mahyad Tousi =

Iranian filmmaker (born 1973)

- Born: 1973 (age 52–53); Portland, Oregon, U.S.
- Occupations: Scriptwriter, producer, director
- Years active: November 2015–present

Mahyad Tousi (born 1973) is an Iranian–American filmmaker, scriptwriter, producer and director. He has created/co-created, directed and produced several films and documentaries including Looking For Palladin (2008), Of Kings and Prophets (2016) and United States of Al (2021–22).

== Early life and career ==
Tousi was born in 1973, in Portland, Oregon and raised in Tehran, Iran. He emigrated to the United States as a teenager in 1986.

In 2007, along with Reza Aslan, he co-founded BoomGen Studios, an entertainment based company helping contents related to the Middle East. In 2020, he founded Starfish, an accelerator program industry.

== Filmography ==
Tousi produced Looking For Palladin (2008). He was the executive producer of the ABC Signature TV series, Of Kings and Prophets (2016), and on two seasons of the CBS primetime comedy, United States of Al.

In 2022, Tousi wrote and co-created Remote, with video artist, Mika Rottenberg. He was also among the executive producers of the virtual-reality documentary, Zikr: A Sufi Revival.

== Awards ==
- 2022 MPAC Media Award for United States of Al.
