= Farrah Mackenzie =

American actress

- Born: October 29, 2005 (age 21); Los Angeles, California
- Occupation: Actress
- Years active: 2011–present

Farrah Mackenzie (born October 29, 2005) is an American actress. She is best known for playing Alice in the sci-fi drama series Utopia and Hazel in the sitcom United States of Al.

== Early life ==
Mackenzie was born in Los Angeles, California to actors Angela Little and Andy Mackenzie. Her grandparents were also actors who met on Broadway.

== Career ==
She played Stella Parton, the younger sister of Dolly Parton in two biopics about Dolly's life, Dolly Parton's Coat of Many Colors Dolly Parton's Christmas of Many Colors: Circle of Love. Her first big role came playing Alice in the sci-fi drama series Utopia. Her biggest role so far has been playing Hazel in the sitcom United States of Al. She starred alongside huge stars such as Julia Roberts, Kevin Bacon and Ethan Hawke in the psychological thriller Leave the World Behind.

== Personal life ==
Mackenzie has had numerous health problems. Since she was 2 she had a condition that caused her body to fight itself, making breathing difficult and stunting her growth. When she was 7 she was diagnosed with Primary Immune Deficiency Disorder. She likes to draw anime, ski and snowboard, playing guitar, and has joined a rock-climbing team

== Filmography ==
=== Film ===
Year	Title	Role	Notes
2011	The Heart's Eye View (In 3D)	Little Girl	Short
2014	Sitter Cam	Chloe Kessler	
2014	Once Upon a Prince	Sadie	Short
2015	The Shrink	Young Therapist	
2015	Dolly Parton's Coat of Many Colors	Stella Parton	
2016	Alien Hunter	Skyler Lincoln	Short
2016	Apartment 407	Olivia	
2016	Dolly Parton's Christmas of Many Colors: Circle of Love	Stella Parton	
2017	You Get Me	Tiffany	
2017	Logan Lucky	Sadie Logan	
2017	Please Stand By	Young Wendy	
2018	Lawless Range	Emily Donnelly	
2018	Amanda McKay	Amanda McKay	Short
2018	Ascension	Chloe	Short
2019	Boléro	Young Maya	Short
2023	Leave the World Behind	Rose Sandford	

=== Television ===
Year	Title	Role	Notes
2014	Workaholics	Puppet Hugger	Episode; We Be Clownin
2014	Comedy Bang! Bang!	Milkmina	Episode; Amber Tamblyn Wears a Leather Jacket & Black Booties
2016	Stuck in the Middle	Sweet Girl	Episode; Stuck in Harley's Comet
2020	Utopia	Alice	8 episodes
2021-2022	United States of Al	Hazel	29 episodes
