= Masquerade (2021 film) =

- Promotional release poster
- Directed by: Shane Dax Taylor
- Written by: Shane Dax Taylor
- Produced by: Shane Dax Taylor; Steven Schneider; Kenneth Burke
- Starring: Bella Thorne; Alyvia Alyn Lind; Austin Nichols; Mircea Monroe; Skyler Samuels
- Cinematography: Mark Rutledge
- Edited by: Scott Adderton
- Music by: Ben Lovett
- Production companies: Racer Entertainment; XYZ Films
- Distributed by: Shout! Factory
- Release date: July 30, 2021
- Running time: 80 minutes
- Country: United States
- Language: English

Masquerade is a 2021 American thriller film, written and directed by Shane Dax Taylor. It stars Bella Thorne, Alyvia Alyn Lind, Austin Nichols, Mircea Monroe and Skyler Samuels. It was released on July 30, 2021, by Shout! Factory.

== Plot ==
While attending a local charity event, art broker Daniel (Austin Nichols) and his wife Olivia (Mircea Monroe) meet waitress Rose (Bella Thorne), who offers them a ride home after they decide they are too drunk to take the wheel. At home, Casey (Alyvia Alyn Lind) is being babysat by Sofia when the power goes out. When Sofia goes to investigate, she is assaulted and accidentally killed by two masked thieves, who came to steal the family's artwork. When Daniel and Olivia arrive at their home, they see it plunged in the dark; while Daniel goes to inspect the power lines for possible damage, Olivia is ambushed and knocked out. When Daniel enters the house looking for Olivia, he is attacked by a masked Rose, who incapacitates him by stabbing him in the stomach and drags him to a room where Daniel is coerced into giving the password to his safe. Casey manages to hide from the thieves and arm herself with a revolver; she fatally shoots one of the thieves, but is overpowered by the other, who takes the weapon from her and shoots her with it. As Casey lies on the floor bleeding, the masked thief proceeds to taunt her, blaming her for what has happened. He then unmasks himself, revealing himself to be Daniel, and leaves Casey to her fate. It turns out that all the scenes with Casey were flashbacks and Rose is actually an adult Casey who conspired with Sofia's sister to get revenge on Daniel for killing her parents and stealing their artwork.

== Cast ==
- Bella Thorne as Rose
- Alyvia Alyn Lind as Casey
- Austin Nichols as Daniel
- Mircea Monroe as Olivia
- Joana Metrass as Sofia
- Ana Rodas as Nanny
- Skyler Samuels as Woman

== Production ==
In December 2019, it was announced Bella Thorne, Alyvia Alyn Lind, Austin Nichols, Mircea Monroe and Skyler Samuels had joined the cast of the film, with Shane Dax Taylor directing from a screenplay he wrote, with XYZ Films set to produce the film.

Principal photography began in December 2019.

== Release ==
In March 2021, Shout! Factory acquired distribution rights to the film. It was released on July 30, 2021.

== Reception ==
The review aggregator website Rotten Tomatoes surveyed fifteen critics and, categorizing the reviews as positive or negative, assessed 2 as positive and 13 as negative for a 13% rating. Among the reviews, it determined an average rating of 3.40 out of 10.
