= Lauren Green =

American journalist and musician

- Born: Lauren Susan Green; June 30, 1958 (age 68); Minneapolis, Minnesota, U.S.
- Education: University of Minnesota; Northwestern University
- Occupations: Correspondent (Fox News)
- Height: 5 ft 10 in (178 cm)
- Spouse: Ted Nikolis

Lauren Susan Green (born June 30, 1958) is the Chief Religion Correspondent for Fox News. Previously she was a headline anchor giving weekday updates at the top and bottom of the hour during morning television show Fox & Friends. She has also appeared as a guest panelist on Fox's late-night satire show Red Eye w/ Greg Gutfeld. She is the first African-American Miss Minnesota.

== Early life ==
Green was born to Robert and Bessie Grissam Green in Minneapolis. She has two sisters, Barbara and Lois, and two brothers, Leslie and Kenneth. In an interview with Bill O'Reilly she admitted that when she was in the sixth grade, Prince had a crush on her, called her to say "I like you", and she hung up on him. She later appeared in the music video for Prince's 1992 song My Name Is Prince, playing a news anchor and using her own name of Lauren Green. She won the Miss Minnesota pageant in 1984, and was third runner-up in the Miss America 1985 pageant.

Green earned her Bachelor of Music in piano performance from the University of Minnesota in 1980, then attended graduate school at the Medill School of Journalism at Northwestern University.

Green is a practicing Christian and was raised in the African Methodist Episcopal Church.

== Interview with Reza Aslan ==
In 2011, Green asked whether Islam "makes believers more susceptible to radicalization."

Ιn a 2013 interview with Iranian-American scholar Reza Aslan about his new book, Zealot: The Life and Times of Jesus of Nazareth, Green questioned the Muslim scholar for the reasons of his research on Jesus and Christianity, in general, asking "why a Muslim would write about Jesus." Aslan defended his credentials several times throughout, and stated that his motive and interest were explicitly scholarly since religion is indeed his field of research. Green continued to press him on the same matter, appearing not to accept Aslan's explanations. Aslan stated that "anyone who thinks this book is an attack on Christianity has not read it yet."

Green received considerable criticism for her line of questioning. Erik Wemple of The Washington Post disparaged Green's questions as "dumb, loaded, and prejudicial," calling for the Fox News Channel to apologize to Aslan. Daniel Politi of Slate speculated that the interview was possibly "the single most cringe-worthy, embarrassing interview on Fox News [...] in recent memory." In a Guardian op-ed, Roy Greenslade posed the rhetorical question, if "even by Fox News's standards, is this its most embarrassing interview?" Meredith Blake, in the Los Angeles Times, wrote that, in the "cringe-inducing interview," Green seemed to object to Aslan's background more than the actual contents of the book.

Fox News' Dan Gainor defended Green, writing in an op-ed that in "the liberal media, one dare not ever question the motives of Muslims."

Τhe book, buoyed by the viral interview, went on to become a New York Times best seller.

== Music ==
In 2004, Green released an album called Classic Beauty consisting of classical piano music.

Green also played keyboards for Mike Huckabee's band called The Little Rockers on the Fox News program Huckabee.

In January 2014 Green performed in the 90th birthday concert for Georg Ratzinger, the brother of Pope Emeritus Benedict XVI, who was also in attendance. She described this in an opinion piece written for Fox News as "the honor of a lifetime."

== COVID-19 pandemic ==
Throughout the COVID-19 pandemic, Green advocated for churches who defied court orders to stop large gatherings. An editorial written by her, and published by Fox News on March 15 featured a stock photo of people holding hands when CDC guidelines at the time advised against it. The article called washing hands, sanitizing homes, and practicing physical distancing a "temporary or flimsy barrier to a raging tsunami" and said "To close the churches where people go for comfort and spiritual strength – as an act of fighting against this biological scourge – seems like a surrender to Satan."

Green interviewed Louisiana pastor Tony Spell for a Fox News piece in which she argued that "The fundamental right to freedom of religion in the United States is sacrosanct." In Green's piece Spell claimed the church closings were politically motivated, and that through faith his church members had been "healed of HIV and cancer -- diseases [that are] bigger than COVID-19."
