= An American Girl Story – Maryellen 1955: Extraordinary Christmas =

2016 film by Valerie Weiss

- Promo poster
- Directed by: Valerie Weiss
- Screenplay by: Jamie Pachino
- Based on: the Maryellen books by Valerie Tripp
- Starring: Alyvia Alyn Lind; Mary McCormack; Madison Lawlor
- Music by: Sasha Gordon
- Production companies: Jane Startz Productions; Picrow; Amazon Studios
- Distributed by: Amazon.com
- Release date: November 25, 2016
- Running time: 48 minutes
- Country: United States
- Language: English

An American Girl Story – Maryellen 1955: Extraordinary Christmas is a 2016 family-drama film starring Alyvia Alyn Lind in the title role, along with Mary McCormack and Madison Lawlor in supporting roles. The film takes place in mid-1950s Daytona Beach, Florida, centering on Maryellen Larkin's life together with her big family, longing to stand out among her siblings and other relatives, and how she helped a number of young patients at a polio ward, Maryellen herself had polio.

Extraordinary Christmas is the second in the American Girl film series to be released exclusively on an online streaming service, and is the twelfth release overall. It is also the second American Girl film to feature the Maryellen character, the first being the short Maryellen and the Brightest Star starring Harlie Galloway.

== Plot ==
In 1955, Maryellen Larkin (Lind) lives with her big family in Daytona Beach, Florida, longing to stand out among her siblings and relatives, even if it meant getting herself into certain trouble like making mischief at a store and wearing pants she took from the boys' department, or painting their house's door red.

Then one day a family friend named Benji (Faraci) arrives. Polio-stricken, Benji is unable to walk properly due to his condition and has to wear a leg brace to which Maryellen understands, as she had been a polio patient herself with one of her legs slightly withered. Moved by this, along with the plight of others with polio at the children's ward, she plans a Christmas party for the patients, only for no one from her siblings to volunteer with her, and to be impeded by the hospital's strict rules.

Maryellen's friend Davy (Donovan) also expresses his doubts about the planned party, leading to an argument and offending Maryellen's feelings. Not willing to despair, she uses her talent in drawing to cheer up the patients, and gives away her pocket money, originally meant to be spent on a trip to Georgia to see her grandparents, to Benji so his mother can pay a visit to him at the hospital. Davy reconciles with Maryellen, and surprise her with making picture frames for her drawings to be shown at the hospital.

Maryellen and her mother arrive at the house, to be met by Grandmom and Grandpop who were paying a surprise visit after hearing about their granddaughter's act of generosity towards the polio patients. They give her a box of snow as a present to make up for not being able to go to Georgia, and Maryellen learns how simple acts of kindness are the best Christmas gift one can give.

== Cast ==
- Alyvia Alyn Lind as Maryellen Larkin
- Mary McCormack as Kay Larkin
- Madison Lawlor as Joan Larkin
- Maxwell Acee Donovan as Davy Fenstermacher
- Samuel Faraci as Benji
- Jessica Belkin as Carolyn Larkin
- Alex MacNicoll as Jerry Ross
- Gerald Downey as Mr. Larkin
- Noelle E. Parker as Beverly Larkin
- Jax Daniel Morgan as Tom Larkin
- Paul Linke as Grandpop
- Mary Linda Phillips as Grandmom

== Release ==
The direct-to-video film was released to Amazon Prime subscribers on November 25, 2016.

== Reception ==
Ken Tucker of Yahoo TV gave the film a mixed review, calling it a "very careful family fare", pointing out the anachronistic language and inconsistencies in the film's historical accuracy, saying "It's so busy force-feeding its young 2016 audience with proper 2016 attitudes, it fails to capture what the 1950s were like, which might actually be entertaining to any American Girl doll owner".
