= Reza Aslan =

Iranian-American scholar of religious studies (born 1972)

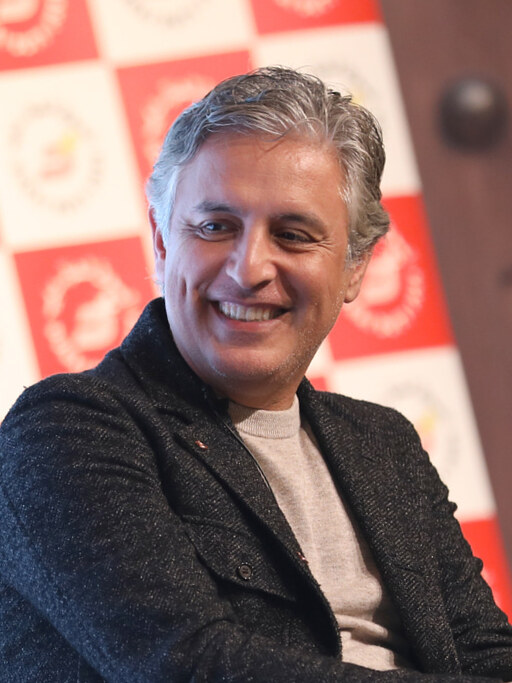
- Aslan in 2023
- Born: May 3, 1972 (age 54); Tehran, Iran
- Education: Santa Clara University (BA); Harvard University (MTS); University of Iowa (MFA); University of California, Santa Barbara (PhD)
- Occupations: Scholar; writer; TV host
- Organization(s): Aslan Media Inc., BoomGen Studios
- Notable work: No God but God; Zealot
- Spouse: Jessica Jackley (m. 2011)
- Children: 3
- Relatives: Leila Forouhar (aunt)

Reza Aslan (Persian: رضا اصلان, IPA: [ˈɾezɒː æsˈlɒːn]; born May 3, 1972) is an Iranian-American scholar of sociology, writer, and television host.

A convert to evangelical Christianity from Shia Islam as a youth, Aslan eventually reverted to Islam but continued to write about Christianity. He has written five books on religion: No God but God: The Origins, Evolution, and Future of Islam; Beyond Fundamentalism: Confronting Religious Extremism in the Age of Globalization; Zealot: The Life and Times of Jesus of Nazareth; God: A Human History; and in 2022 An American Martyr in Persia: The Epic Life and Tragic Death of Howard Baskerville.

Aslan has worked for television, including a documentary series exploring world religions on CNN called Believer, and served as an executive producer on the HBO drama series The Leftovers. Aslan is a member of the American Academy of Religion and the International Qur'anic Studies Association. He is a professor of creative writing at University of California, Riverside, and a board member of the National Iranian American Council (NIAC).

== Background ==
Aslan's family came to the United States from Tehran in 1979, fleeing the Iranian Revolution. He grew up in the San Francisco Bay Area. Aslan says that he "spent the 1980s pretending to be Mexican" due to the amount of discrimination faced by Iranian Americans. He attended Del Mar High School in San Jose, and graduated class of 1990. In the early 1990s, Aslan taught courses at De La Salle High School in Concord, California.

Aslan holds a B.A. in religious studies from Santa Clara University, a Master of Theological Studies (MTS) from Harvard Divinity School, a Master of Fine Arts (M.F.A.) in fiction writing from the University of Iowa's Writers' Workshop, and a Ph.D. in sociology from the University of California, Santa Barbara. His 2009 dissertation, "Global Jihadism as a Transnational Social Movement: A Theoretical Framework", discusses contemporary Muslim political activism.

In August 2000, while serving as the Truman Capote Fellow at the Iowa Writers' Workshop, Aslan was a visiting faculty member in Islamic and Middle Eastern Studies at the University of Iowa.

Aslan was the 2012–13 Wallerstein Distinguished Visiting professor at the Drew University Center on Religion, Culture & Conflict.

An Adjunct Senior Fellow at the Council on Foreign Relations from 2012 to 2013, he is also a member of the Los Angeles Institute for the Humanities, and the Pacific Council on International Policy. He has served as Legislative Assistant for the Friends Committee on National Legislation in Washington D.C., and was elected President of Harvard's Chapter of the World Conference of Religions for Peace. Aslan also serves on the board of directors of the Ploughshares Fund, which gives grants for peace and security issues, PEN Center USA, a writer's advocacy group, and he serves on the national advisory board of The Markaz (formerly the Levantine Cultural Center), a program to promote peace between Americans and the Arab/Muslim world. He also serves on the board of trustees for the Chicago Theological Seminary and is on the advisory board of the Yale Humanist Community.

=== Religious views ===
Aslan was born into a Twelver Shia Muslim family. He converted to evangelical Christianity at the age of 15, and converted back to Islam the summer before attending Harvard. Aslan completed his Harvard degree in 1999. In 2005, The Guardian called him "a Shia by persuasion". In a 2013 interview with WNYC host Brian Lehrer, Aslan said: "I'm definitely a Muslim and Sufism is the tradition within Islam that I most closely adhere to." In a 2013 article in The Washington Post, Aslan stated: "It's not [that] I think Islam is correct and Christianity is incorrect. It's that all religions are nothing more than a language made up of symbols and metaphors to help an individual explain faith." In 2014, in an interview with Cenk Uygur of The Young Turks, Aslan described Islam as:

a man-made institution. It's a set of symbols and metaphors that provides a language for which to express what is inexpressible, and that is faith. It's symbols and metaphors that I prefer, but it's not more right or more wrong than any other symbols and metaphors. It's a language; that's all it is.

== Career ==
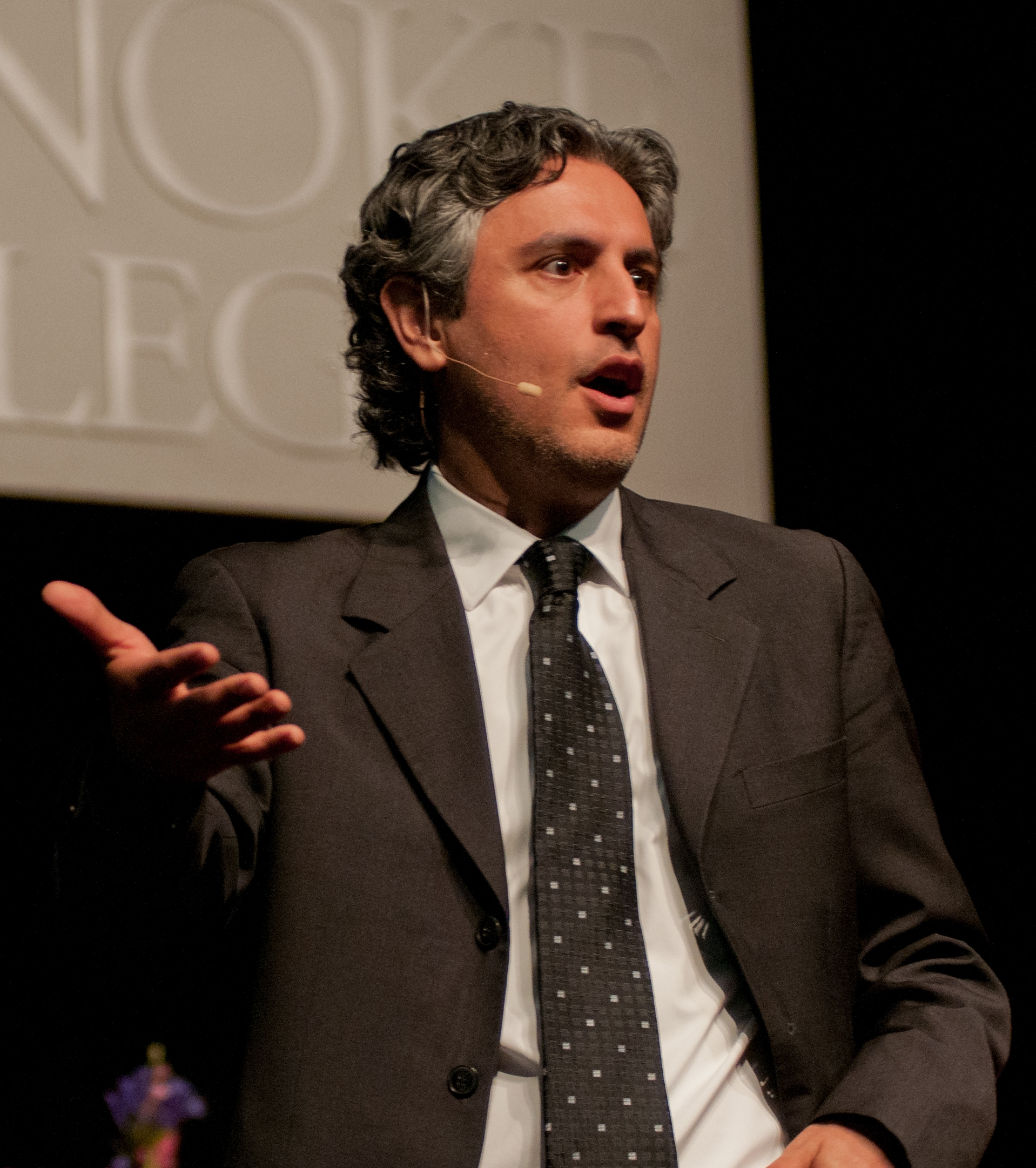
Aslan speaking at Roanoke College, 18 April 2012

=== Writing ===
Aslan has published four books, edited two anthologies, and frequently writes for different media outlets.

==== Books ====
===== No God but God: The Origins, Evolution, and Future of Islam =====
No god but God: The Origins, Evolution, and Future of Islam is a non-fiction book published in 2005. The book describes the history of Islam and argues for a liberal interpretation of the Islamic religion. It blames Western imperialism and self-serving misinterpretations of Islamic law by past scholars for the current controversies within Islam, challenging the "Clash of Civilizations" thesis.

===== How to Win a Cosmic War (a.k.a. Beyond Fundamentalism) =====
In 2009, Aslan published his second book, How to Win a Cosmic War: God, Globalization, and the End of Terror. The next year, it was re-released in paperback as Beyond Fundamentalism: Confronting Religious Extremism in the Age of Globalization. The book is both a study of the ideology fueling Al Qaeda, the Taliban and like-minded militants throughout the Muslim world, and an exploration of religious violence in Judaism, Christianity, and Islam. Aslan argues that the United States is fighting a similar war by infusing the war on terror with its religiously polarizing rhetoric. This war, he asserts, cannot be won.

Aslan refers to Al Qaeda's jihad against the West as "a cosmic war", distinct from holy war, in which rival religious groups are engaged in an earthly battle for material goals. "A cosmic war is like a ritual drama in which participants act out on earth a battle they believe is actually taking place in the heavens." American rhetoric of "war on terrorism", Aslan says, is in precise "cosmic dualism" to Al Qaeda's jihad. Aslan distinguishes Islamism and Jihadism. Islamists have legitimate goals and can be negotiated with, unlike Jihadists, who dream of an idealized past of a pan-Islamic, borderless "religious communalism". Aslan's prescription for winning the cosmic war is not to fight but to engage moderate Islamic political forces in the democratic process. "Throughout the Middle East, whenever moderate Islamist parties have been allowed to participate in the political process, popular support for more extremist groups has diminished."

The New Yorker called Beyond Fundamentalism a "thoughtful analysis of America's War on Terror". The Washington Post added that it "offers a very persuasive argument for the best way to counter jihadism."

===== Zealot: The Life and Times of Jesus of Nazareth =====
Aslan's book Zealot: The Life and Times of Jesus of Nazareth (2013) is an historical account of the life of Jesus, which analyzes the various religious perspectives on Jesus, as well as the creation of Christianity. In the book, Aslan argues that Jesus was a political, rebellious, and eschatological Jew whose proclamation of the coming kingdom of God was a call for regime change to end Roman hegemony over Roman Judea and end a corrupt and oppressive aristocratic priesthood.

===== God: A Human History =====
In this book, published by Random House in 2017, Aslan explains in an accessible scholarly style the history of religion and a theory of why and how humans started thinking about supernatural beings and eventually God.

===== An American Martyr in Persia: The Epic Life and Tragic Death of Howard Baskerville =====
On October 11, 2022, W. W. Norton & Company published Aslan's book about Howard Baskerville. Kirkus Reviews called it "an intriguing read that breathes life into a pivotal moment of Persian/Iranian history".

==== Other writing ====
Aslan has written articles for The Daily Beast as a contributing editor. He has also written for various newspapers and periodicals, including the Los Angeles Times, The New York Times and The Washington Post, Slate, The Boston Globe, The Guardian, The Nation, and The Christian Science Monitor.

=== Work as editor ===
Tablet and Pen: Literary Landscapes from the Modern Middle East, an anthology he edited and published, appeared in 2011. In collaboration with Words Without Borders, Aslan worked with a team of three regional editors and seventy-seven translators, amassing a collection of nearly 200 pieces originally written in Arabic, Persian, Urdu, and Turkish, many presented in English for the first time.

Muslims and Jews in America: Commonalities, Contentions, and Complexities (2011) co-edited with Abraham's Vision founder Aaron J. Hahn Tapper, is a collection of essays exploring contemporary Jewish–Muslim relations in the United States and the distinct ways in which these two communities interact with one another in that context.

=== Business ventures ===
==== Aslan Media ====
Aslan founded Aslan Media, a media platform offering alternative coverage of the Middle East and its global diaspora communities.

==== BoomGen Studios ====
In 2006, Aslan partnered with Iranian American cinematographer and producer Mahyad Tousi to create BoomGen Studios, a studio and production company focused on bringing stories from and about the Middle East to American audiences. Projects that they consulted on include National Geographic's Amreeka; Disney's Prince of Persia: The Sands of Time and the Broadway adaptation of Aladdin; the Weinstein Company's Miral; Relativity Media's Desert Dancer; Fork Films' The Trials of Spring; Jon Stewart's directorial debut Rosewater; and 2014 Oscar-nominated documentary The Square.

===== Of Kings and Prophets =====
In January 2015, BoomGen announced that ABC picked up its biblical epic, Of Kings and Prophets, a dramatic retelling of the central story in the Hebrew Bible: the story of King David from shepherd to king. The series followed an ensemble of characters, including Saul and David, the successive Kings of Israel, their families, and their political rivals. Of Kings and Prophets was set in the Kingdom of Israel but filmed in Cape Town, South Africa. Aslan, Tousi, and Jason Reed served as executive producers on the show.

==== TV projects ====
===== The Leftovers =====
In 2015, Aslan joined the HBO series The Leftovers as a consulting producer for both its second and third seasons. Aslan was integral to shaping protagonist Kevin Garvey's season two character arc.

===== Rough Draft =====
In March 2016, cable network Ovation premiered Rough Draft with Reza Aslan, a fast-paced talk show featuring Aslan conversing with critically acclaimed authors and writers in film, TV, and journalism.

===== Believer =====
In 2015, Aslan began production on the "spiritual travel series" Believer, a documentary series that follows Aslan as he immerses himself and experiences various religious traditions internationally, focusing on sects considered fringe and disreputable by larger religions. The program, which Aslan compared to Anthony Bourdain: Parts Unknown was part of CNN's original programming lineup and premiered in March 2017.

The first episode focused on the Aghori sect of Hinduism. Aslan was accused of sensationalism and anti-Hinduism when Aslan ate part of a human brain while meeting Aghori sadhus. The United States India Political Action Committee said in a statement that "[w]ith multiple reports of hate-fueled attacks against people of Indian origin from across the U.S., the show characterizes Hinduism as cannibalistic, which is a bizarre way of looking at the third largest religion in the world." Vamsee Juluri, professor of media studies at the University of San Francisco, described the episode as "reckless, racist, and anti-immigrant", while Aseem Shukla of the Hindu American Foundation accused Aslan of being "poorly informed", circulating "common stereotypical misconceptions" about Hinduism and indulging in "religion porn" "to grab ratings", with the "most clichéd, spurious conflations of the Hindu religion with the caste system".

US Congresswoman Tulsi Gabbard compared the show to "touring a zoo". The show has also been criticized for saying that Varanasi was called "the city of the dead", calling the immersion of ashes "dumping", presenting the Aghors as an exception in their struggle against the caste system, and claims he misunderstood the distinction between Varna and Jāti, and the notion of God in Hinduism. The organizations American Hindus Against Defamation (AHAD) and the Hindu American Foundation (HAF) have also both questioned why Aslan's show does not cover Islam, his own religion. Aslan said that he had planned to cover the Ashura festival in Pakistan but abandoned the plan because of insurance costs. He pledged to cover Islam if Believer had a second series. On June 9, 2017, CNN announced that it had "decided to not move forward with production" on Aslan's Believer series after his anti-Trump tweets were criticized because of vulgar language used shortly before June 9, 2017.

Aslan defended the episode in a Facebook post.

===== Allah in the Family =====
Aslan (along with Andrew Reich) wrote a sitcom pilot titled "Allah in the Family" based on his experiences as an Iranian immigrant growing up in Oklahoma. ABC bought the pilot but it has yet to go into production.

==== Remarks about Donald Trump ====
After the 2017 London Bridge attack, Aslan took to Twitter to call President Donald Trump "a piece of shit" and a "man-baby" for his response to the attack. On June 9, 2017, in response to his remarks, CNN decided to cut ties with Aslan and announced they would not move forward with season two of the Believer series. Aslan said of the cancellation, "I am not a journalist. I am a social commentator and scholar. And so I agree with CNN that it is best that we part ways."

=== Other media appearances ===
Aslan has made numerous appearances on TV and radio, including National Public Radio (NPR), Spirited Debate on Fox News, PBS, The Rachel Maddow Show, Meet the Press, The Daily Show with Jon Stewart, The Colbert Report, Anderson Cooper 360°, Hardball, Nightline, Real Time with Bill Maher, Fareed Zakaria GPS, and ABC Australia's Big Ideas.

==== 2013 Fox News interview ====
On July 26, 2013, Aslan was interviewed on Spirited Debate, a Fox News webcast by Chief Religion Correspondent Lauren Green about his book Zealot: The Life and Times of Jesus of Nazareth. Green was "unsatisfied with Aslan's credentials," and she pressed Aslan, questioning why a Muslim would write about Jesus. Aslan answered, "Because it's my job as an academic. I am a professor of religion, including the New Testament. That's what I do for a living." The interview lasted about ten minutes and focused "on Aslan's background more than the actual contents of the book." The video clip of the interview went viral within days and the book, which was up to that point selling "steadily", appeared at the 4th place on The New York Times print hardcover best-seller list. By late July 2013, it was topping the U.S. best-seller list on Amazon.

Following Aslan's interview with Fox News, Elizabeth Castelli, professor of religion at Barnard College, Columbia University, reported a sense of outrage in academia, writing "Those of us in the academic field of religious studies, especially biblical scholars and historians of early Christianity, found the whole business deeply cringe-worthy. The Fox News interview was not just embarrassing but downright offensive. The anti-Muslim bias of Fox is well-documented and is bad enough, whatever the specific context. For scholars of religion, Green's conflation of the academic study of religion with personal religious identification is a familiar misunderstanding."

Despite Castelli's dismissal of Fox News for questioning Aslan as a religious scholar, as she acknowledged Aslan could claim as a scholar of "history-of-religions", she dismissed his claims of being a historian. She wrote "History of religions is ... a particular disciplinary approach... often associated in the United States with the University of Chicago and the University of California at Santa Barbara, where Aslan earned his PhD in sociology. To the extent that he did coursework in the UCSB Religious Studies department, he can certainly lay claim ... But his claims are more grandiose than that and are based on his repeated public statements that he speaks with authority as a historian. He has therefore reasonably opened himself to criticism." The Atlantic concurred with Prof. Castelli's acknowledgment of Aslan's religious credentials.

In The Washington Post, the journalist Manuel Roig-Franzia concurred with Prof. Castelli's critique of Aslan's historian credentials, noting that Aslan's university does not offer degrees in the history or the sociology of religion and writing that Aslan "boasts of academic laurels he does not have." However, he quoted Aslan's dissertation adviser, Mark Juergensmeyer, who acknowledged that their departments "don't have a degree in sociology of religions as such" but said that he "doesn't have a problem with Aslan's characterization of his doctorate, noting ... [Aslan] did most of his course work in religion" and his arrangement of getting Aslan out of the religious studies department into the sociology department "was undertaken to get Aslan out of time-consuming required language courses". The Philadelphia Inquirer also noted UCSB "is famous for its interdisciplinary program—students tailor their studies around a topic, not a department. They choose a department only for the diploma."

=== Academia ===
He is a professor of creative writing at University of California, Riverside and a board member of the National Iranian American Council (NIAC).

=== Professional membership ===
Aslan is a sitting member of the advisory board for the National Iranian American Council. In 2015 as a member of the group, he joined with 73 other "prominent International Relations and Middle East scholars" in signing a statement of support for the Joint Comprehensive Plan of Action, an international agreement regarding the Iranian nuclear program.

== Political analysis ==
=== Analysis of War on Terrorism ===
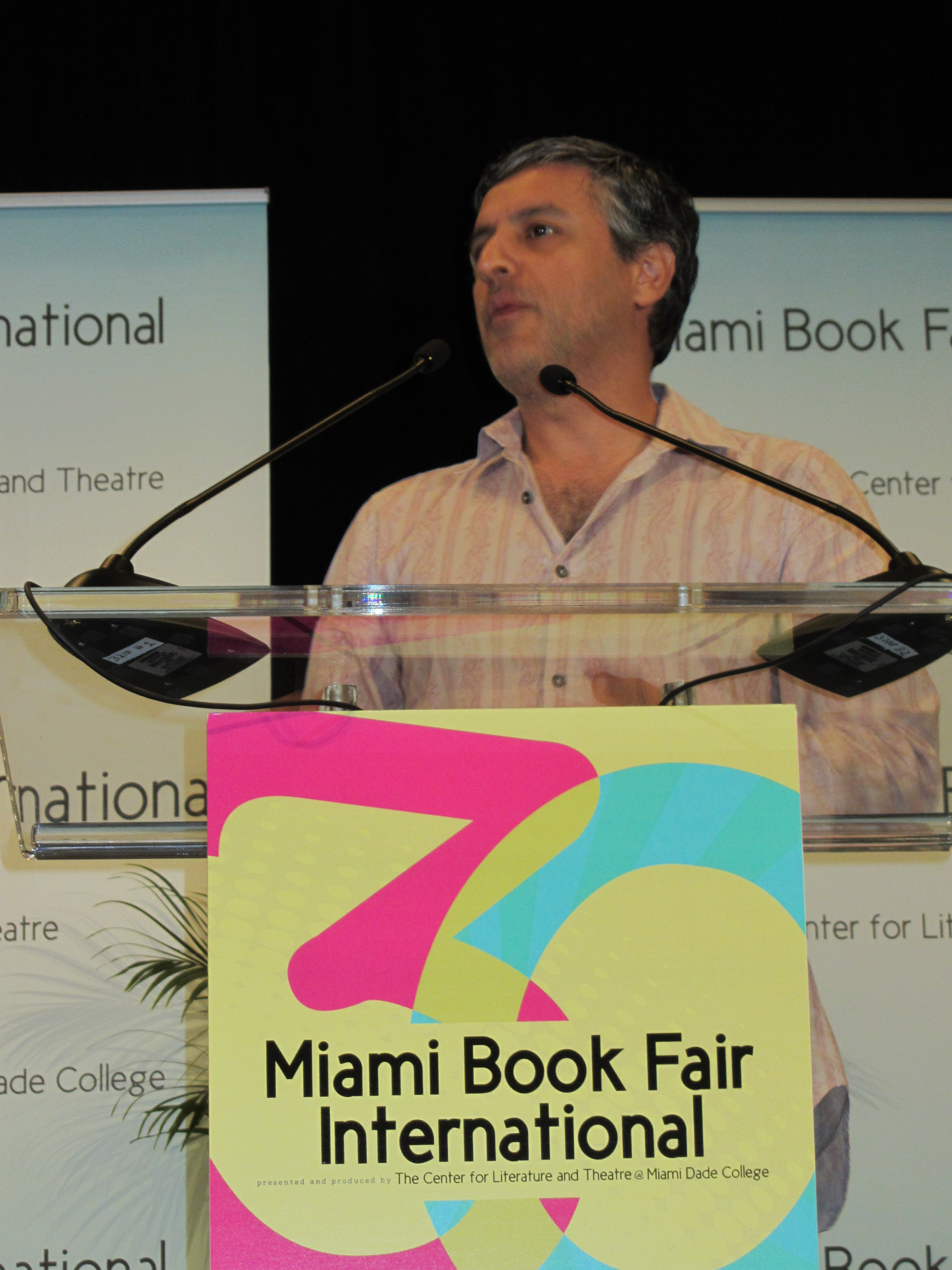
Reza Aslan at the Miami Book Fair International 2013

Aslan refers to Al Qaeda's jihad against the West as "a cosmic war", distinct from holy war, in which rival religious groups are engaged in an earthly battle for material goals. "A cosmic war is like a ritual drama in which participants act out on earth a battle they believe is actually taking place in the heavens." American rhetoric of "war on terrorism", Aslan says, opposes Al Qaeda's jihad within this very structure of "cosmic dualism". Aslan draws a distinction between Islamism and Jihadism. Islamists have legitimate goals and can be negotiated with, unlike Jihadists, who dream of an idealized past of a pan-Islamic, borderless "religious communalism". Aslan's prescription for winning the cosmic war is not to fight but to engage moderate Islamic political forces in the democratic process. "Throughout the Middle East, whenever moderate Islamist parties have been allowed to participate in the political process, popular support for more extremist groups has diminished."

=== Protection of religious freedom ===
Aslan has argued for religious freedom and protection for religious minorities throughout the Middle East. He has called for Iran to protect and stop the "horrific human rights abuses" against its Baháʼí community. Aslan has also said that the persecution and displacement of Middle Eastern Christian communities "is nothing less than a regional religious cleansing that will soon prove to be a historic disaster for Christians and Muslims alike."

=== Criticism of New Atheism ===
In a 2014 interview, Aslan criticized the "armchair atheism" of atheists like Sam Harris and Bill Maher who lack formal training in the study of religion, and who, in Aslan's opinion, are therefore unable to effectively comment on how it shapes human behavior. Sam Harris criticized Aslan for blaming individuals rather than Islam as a whole for violence in the Muslim world, calling his approach "post-modernist nonsense." Aslan has also called Richard Dawkins a "buffoon, embarrassing himself every day." He contrasts New Atheists with the "philosophical atheism" of earlier thinkers who "were experts in religion, and so they were able to offer critiques of it that came from a place of knowledge, from a sophistication of education, of research."

On September 29, 2014, Antonia Blumberg in The Huffington Post stated that Aslan, on CNN, "criticized comedian Bill Maher for characterizing female genital mutilation as an 'Islamic problem,' in addition to making several other sweeping generalizations about the faith." Aslan was reported as saying "To say 'Muslim countries', as though Pakistan and Turkey are the same ... it's frankly, and I use this word seriously, stupid!" His criticism was not just of Maher but of how Muslims are portrayed in mainstream media. Prachi Gupta, in Salon, wrote that Aslan believed that the U.S. was partnering with Saudi Arabia while simultaneously condemning ISIS.

On October 8, 2014, The New York Times published an article by Aslan, "Bill Maher Isn't the Only One Who Misunderstands Religion". In it, Aslan wrote, "Bill Maher is right to condemn religious practices that violate fundamental human rights. Religious communities must do more to counter extremist interpretations of their faith. But failing to recognize that religion is embedded in culture—and making a blanket judgment about the world's second-largest religion—is simply bigotry."

In The New Republic, Eric Sasson took issue with Aslan's claim in the CNN interview that men and women are treated equally in Indonesia and Turkey due to the countries having elected female leaders, pointing out that the Human Rights Watch reported a "significant rollback" of women's rights in both countries. Sasson also challenged Aslan's claim that female genital mutilation is a problem only in central Africa, saying that it's also an issue in the predominantly Muslim country of Malaysia. The television and radio host David Pakman also cast doubt on some of Aslan's claims from the interview.

== Personal life ==
Aslan and his ex-fiancée, journalist Amanda Fortini, ended their engagement in 2008. He married entrepreneur and author Jessica Jackley, a Christian, in 2011, forming an interfaith family. They have four children, three sons and one daughter. After having lived in Santa Monica, California, they currently live in Hollywood Hills. His aunt is the Iranian-American pop singer Leila Forouhar. Aslan is a fan of the professional football team the Las Vegas Raiders.

== Awards and honors ==
- 2014 Intersections Honoree, Intersections International
- 2013 Media Bridge-Builder Award, Tanenbaum Center for Interreligious Understanding
- 2013 Peter J. Gomes Memorial Honor, Harvard Divinity School
- 2012 East–West Media Award, The Levantine Center

== Publications ==
- "The Struggle for Islam's Soul", in Will Marshall (ed.), With All Our Might: A Progressive Strategy for Defeating Jihadism and Defending Liberty, Rowman & Littlefield Publishers, Inc., 2006.
- "Beyond Fundamentalism: Confronting Religious Extremism in the Age of Globalization", Penguin Random House, 2010.
- "From Here to Mullahcracy", in Lila Azam Zanganeh (ed.), My Sister, Guard Your Veil; My Brother, Guard Your Eyes: Uncensored Iranian Voices, Beacon Press, 2006.
- "Losing the War", in Gilbert H. Muller (ed.), The New World Reader, CUNY Press, 2010.
- How to Win a Cosmic War, published in paperback as Beyond Fundamentalism: Confronting Religious Extremism in a Globalized Age, Random House, 2010.
- Tablet & Pen: Literary Landscapes from the Modern Middle East (editor), W. W. Norton, 2011.
- Muslims and Jews in America: Commonalities, Contentions, and Complexities (co-editor), Palgrave Macmillan, 2011.
- Zealot: The Life and Times of Jesus of Nazareth, Random House, 2013.
- No god but God: The Origins, Evolution, and Future of Islam, Delacorte Books for Young Readers, 2012.
- God: A Human History, Random House, 2017.
- A Kid's Book About Israel and Palestine, A Kids Co., 2024.
