= Dolly Parton's Coat of Many Colors =

2015 American television film directed by Stephen Herek

- Promotional poster
- Genre: Drama
- Screenplay by: Pamela K. Long
- Directed by: Stephen Herek
- Starring: Alyvia Alyn Lind; Jennifer Nettles; Ricky Schroder; Gerald McRaney
- Narrated by: Dolly Parton
- Composers: Velton Ray Bunch; Mark Leggett
- Country of origin: United States
- Original language: English

Production
- Executive producers: Pamela K. Long; Sam Haskell; Dolly Parton
- Producers: Hudson Hickman; Stephanie Johnson
- Cinematography: Brian J. Reynolds
- Editor: Maysie Hoy
- Running time: 120 minutes
- Production companies: Magnolia Hill Productions; DP Productions; Warner Bros. Television

Original release
- Network: NBC
- Release: December 10, 2015

Related
- Dolly Parton's Christmas of Many Colors: Circle of Love

Dolly Parton's Coat of Many Colors is a 2015 American made-for-television drama film based on the life of Dolly Parton, written by Pamela K. Long and directed by Stephen Herek. The film premiered on NBC on December 10, 2015. The film received generally positive reviews from critics.

== Plot ==
Coat of Many Colors details Dolly Parton's upbringing in 1955 as her family struggles to live in Tennessee's Great Smoky Mountains, putting a strain on love and faith. Dolly aspires to be something greater but must cope with family troubles, including the premature birth and death of a baby brother. Dolly's mother, Avie Lee Parton uses the baby's blanket to make Dolly her patchwork coat of many colors. Although Dolly is at first proud of it, she changes her mind after school bullies make fun of her. Meanwhile, Dolly's father, Lee Parton suffers a personal crisis brought about by the baby's death combined with the depression of his wife and a drought which threatened his tobacco crop. Eventually, faith brings the family together again.

== Cast ==
- Alyvia Alyn Lind as Dolly Parton, a precocious nine-year-old who hopes to be a famous singer
- Jennifer Nettles as Avie Lee Parton, the devout matriarch of the Partons living in the mountains
- Ricky Schroder as Robert Lee Parton, the hard-working patriarch of the Partons with faith issues
- Gerald McRaney as Rev. Jake Owens, Avie Lee's father and preacher
- Carson Meyer as Willadeene Parton, Dolly's oldest sister
- Hannah Nordberg as Judy Ogle, Dolly's schoolmate-turned-friend
- Mary Lane Haskell as Miss Moody, school teacher who is firm yet supportive of Dolly's aspiration
- Stella Parton as Corla Bass, owner of the town market and a gossip
- Forrest Deal as Rudy Sanders, a school bully
- Kennedy Brice as Gloria Sanders, Rudy's sister and another bully
- Farrah Mackenzie as Stella Parton, Dolly's younger sister
- Parker Sack as David Parton, Dolly's oldest brother
- Dylan Rowen as Denver Parton, Dolly's second-oldest brother
- Blane Crockarell as Bobby Parton, Dolly's younger brother
- Christopher Ryan Lewis as Claude Sanders, Rudy and Gloria's brother

== Production ==
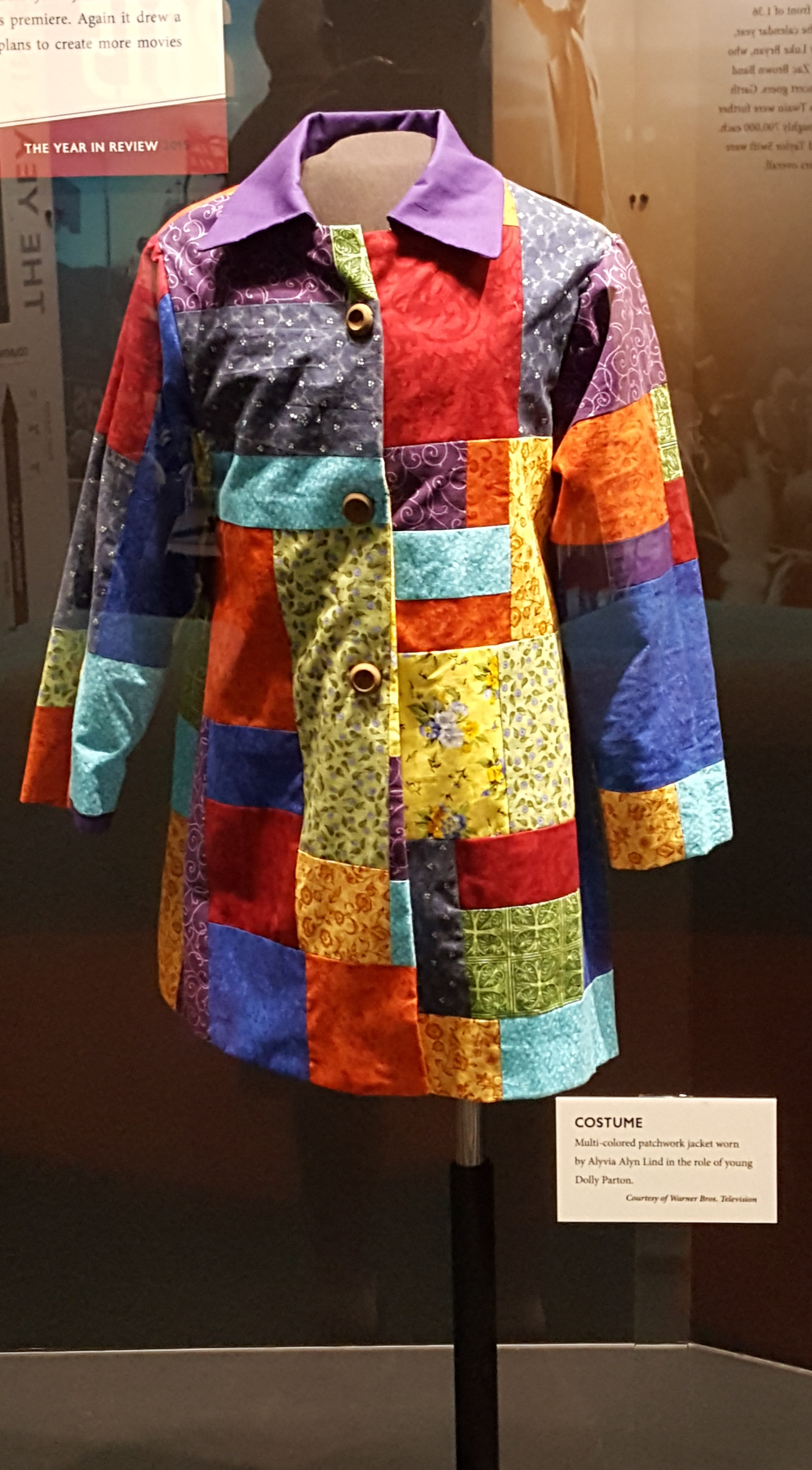
The coat used in the movie that is displayed in the Country Music Hall of Fame and Museum in Nashville, Tennessee.

=== Filming ===
Coat of Many Colors was filmed in Covington and Conyers, Georgia, and Sevier County, Tennessee, the latter at Dollywood for introductory and closing scenes from Dolly Parton.

=== Casting ===
Parton, whose childhood is told in the film's story written by her, is also executive producer. She spoke about the casting process, beginning with singer Jennifer Nettles, who plays her mother: "When she started reading I thought, Oh my Lord, that's momma. And, she is incredible ... I didn't even know she acted." For her father, Parton already had someone in mind, Ricky Schroder, because "he reminds me so much of my daddy." In casting the younger Dolly, several hundred children auditioned. Parton stated "God's going to send her." Alyvia Alyn Lind auditioned and could "sing...act" and "cry on cue", said Parton, adding, "When she came in, it just kind of blew it all out of the water and she got the part." In addition, Dolly's younger sister Stella Parton appears in the film, playing town gossip Corla Bass.

== Reception ==
=== Critical reception ===
Coat of Many Colors received favorable reviews from critics. On Rotten Tomatoes, it has received a 78% rating from nine critics. Among eight reviews at Metacritic, it holds a "generally favorable" score of 65 out of 100.

Ken Tucker of Yahoo TV gave the film its highest praise, stating "The pastoral nostalgia that this TV-movie taps into is powerful, if maudlin, stuff. This is the time of year when sentimentality can be a warming thing, and Parton's Coat will keep an awful lot of people warm this winter."

The Guardian's Brian Moylan commented on the film's faith storyline: "For those who don’t regularly visit the house of the Lord, it will make your eyes roll like loose marbles in the back of a station wagon."

David Wiegand of the San Francisco Chronicle was the most critical but commented: "Although it's a struggle at times, you do suspend disbelief and go with it because Lind is so adorable, and you want to accept that the saccharine story line could have played out in real life just the way it's depicted in the film."

=== Ratings ===
In its initial December 10, 2015 broadcast, Coat of Many Colors was seen by 13.03 million viewers and received a 1.8/6 rating/share in the 18-49 age demographic. This marks the highest viewership for any television film (made for TV or theatrical) or miniseries on the broadcast networks since 2012.

=== Awards ===
On April 3, 2016, Coat of Many Colors was honored during the Academy of Country Music Awards ceremony with the Tex Ritter Award, which is presented to a film released in the previous year that features country music. Dolly Parton accepted the award. At the 6th Critics' Choice Television Awards, Alyvia Alyn Lind was nominated for Best Actress in a Limited Series or Television Movie. It was also awarded the Epiphany Prize during the 2016 MovieGuide Awards.

== Sequel ==
In May 2016, it was announced that a sequel to the film was in the works. In Dolly Parton's Christmas of Many Colors: Circle of Love, Jennifer Nettles, Ricky Schroder, Gerald McRaney and Alyvia Alyn Lind reprised their roles. Stephen Herek returned to direct the sequel written by Pamela K. Long. Dolly Parton herself also had a cameo. The film aired on NBC on November 30, 2016.
