= No God but God: The Origins, Evolution, and Future of Islam =

2005 non-fiction book by Reza Aslan

No god but God
- Author: Reza Aslan
- Language: English
- Genre: Non-fiction
- Publisher: Random House
- Publication date: March 15, 2005
- Publication place: United States
- Media type: Print
- Pages: 310 pages
- ISBN: 1-4000-6213-6
- OCLC: 56367491
- Dewey Decimal: 297 22
- LC Class: BP161.3 .A79 2005

No god but God: The Origins, Evolution, and Future of Islam is a 2005 non-fiction book written by Iranian-American Muslim scholar Reza Aslan. The book describes the history of Islam and argues for a liberal interpretation of the religion. It blames Western imperialism and self-serving misinterpretations of Islamic law by past scholars for the current controversies within Islam, challenging the "clash of civilizations" thesis.

According to conservative columnist Reihan Salam, the book has received a favorable response within the Muslim world.

== Contents ==
Each chapter of the book covers a specific topic within Islam. For example, one chapter is entirely dedicated to the issue of jihad. Over all, the book covers the history of Islam from the point of view of the Islamic prophet, Muhammad as a social reformer struggling for egalitarianism between people. It argues that the Quran does not order the veiling of women and that the concept of jihad was intended to be solely defensive. Aslan focuses primarily on the early practices of Islam, but he also discusses life within the Abbasid Empire, the Ottoman Empire, and in the modern Muslim World.

According to Aslan, Islam is experiencing a struggle between individualistic reform and traditional clerical authority similar to that which took place during the 16th-century Reformation in Christianity. He writes,

the notion that historical context should play no role in the interpretation of the Quran – that what applied to Muhammad's community applies to all Muslim communities for all time – is simply an untenable position in every sense.

== Reception ==
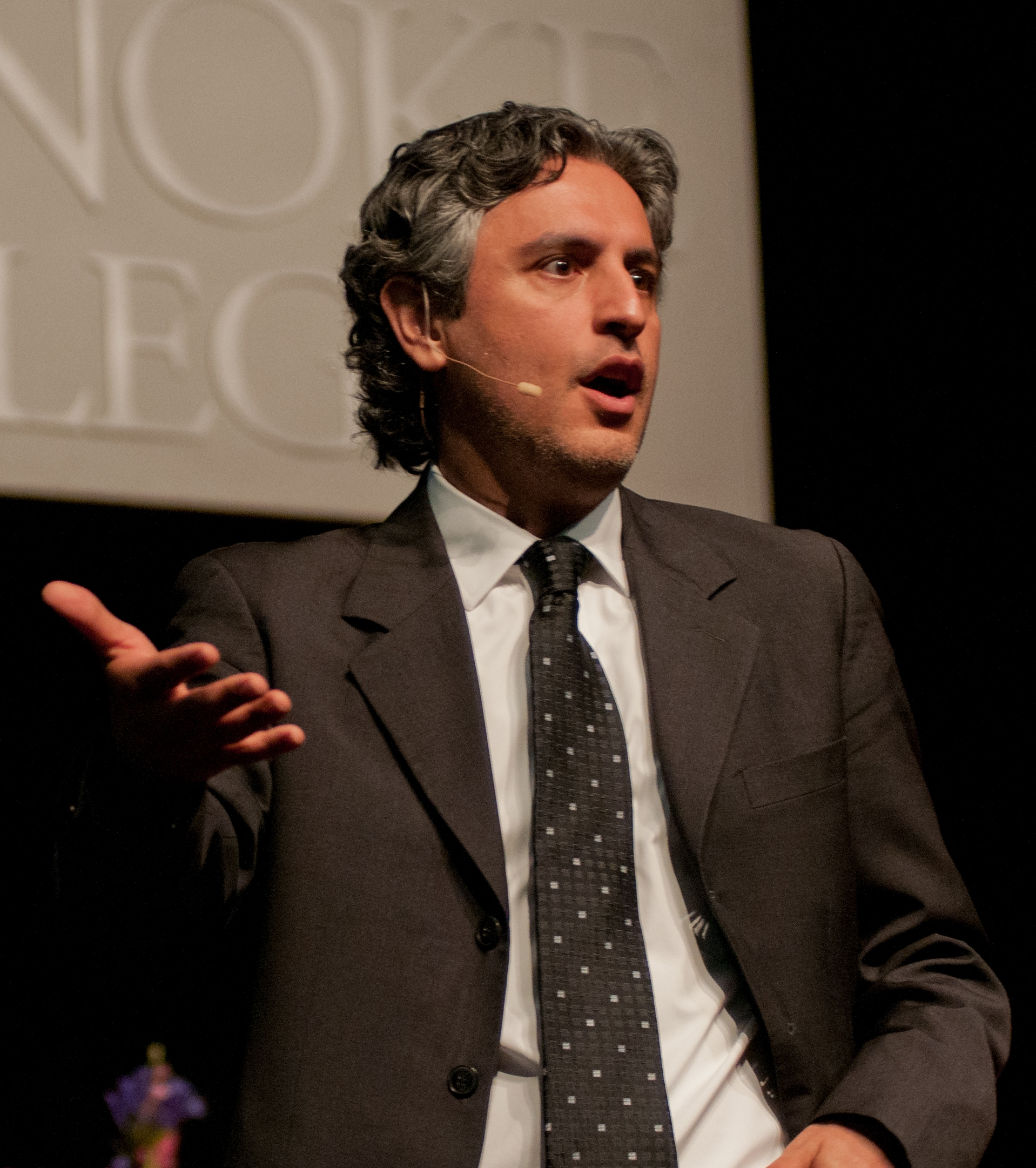
Reza Aslan, the author

The book was chosen "Best Book of the Year" in its category by the Financial Times. The Los Angeles Times dubbed it a "favorite book of the year". Journalist Fareed Zakaria called the book "a textured, nuanced account that presents a living, breathing religion shaped by centuries of history and culture". Professor and author Noah Feldman called it "[e]legant, accessible, and informed by historical scholarship" and "a wonderful view into the rich world of early Islam". A scholarly review in International Journal of Kurdish Studies reported that "[s]uch clarity is a welcome and refreshing antidote to the endless obfuscations that emanate from partisans on both sides of the issue." Also, Muslim journalist Reihan Salam called the book "fascinating", and he has said that he considers it to be one of the most important books of the decade. The New York Review of Books wrote that "[o]ne of the achievements of Reza Aslan's book is that it gives Islam as much internal complexity and diversity as the concepts 'the West' and 'America' possess in our eyes". The New York Times gave a favorable review, describing it as a "wise and passionate book", stating that "his arguments for reintroducing rationalism, for accepting the utility of secularization, and for contextualizing the historical understanding of the faith all put him in distinguished company among contemporary Muslims".

The Washington Post published a mixed review by Nikki R. Keddie, an author and professor emerita of history at UCLA. She contends that Aslan's book is "one of the most readable" and that Aslan presents "a liberal and optimistic view of Islam". She states that Aslan sometimes relies on doubtful sources, that Aslan's "good storytelling occasionally interferes with accuracy", that he minimizes "gender inequalities enshrined in the Koran", and he "ascribes undocumented feelings and motives not only to Muhammad but also to later figures—a technique sometimes endorsed in creative nonfiction courses but not recommended for historians". Aslan gives the most space to Islam's early era, for which the documentation is relatively less. Overall, Keddie stated that "Aslan provides a lively, enjoyable, and mostly accurate picture, but parts of the book are shaky".

The book also received a positive review from The Independent stating that the book is "a fascinating guide" for non-Muslim readers.

The Guardian published a negative review by Tariq Ali, stating that "Aslan's account of early Islam is too literalist" and "Shia sects and some of their more esoteric beliefs have little to do with Islamic theology". It concluded that the book's "aim is to appease western ideologues", and liberal Islam as Aslan sees it is only a "phase and it will pass".

== Promotion ==
According to the San Jose Mercury News, the book turned its author into "a minor celebrity on the cable news circuit". Aslan has spoken about the book across the world. He appeared on HBO's Real Time with Bill Maher on September 22, 2006, to talk about the book.

== See also ==
- Liberal movements within Islam
