= Pam Long =

American television writer and producer

Pamela K. Long is an American writer and executive producer. Long won several Emmys for her work on CBS soap opera Guiding Light from 1983 to 1990. She was also writer and executive producer on the NBC film Dolly Parton's Coat of Many Colors.

== Career ==
Before writing and acting, Long won the title of Miss Alabama in 1974 and competed for the title of Miss America 1975. At the time, she was attending the University of North Alabama, and was involved in the Phi Mu sorority.

After graduation, she moved to New York City and landed the role of Ashley Linden on Texas from 1981 to 1982. She began writing scripts for the show while she was still part of the cast, and in 1982, Long was named head writer of Texas. Ratings in the U.S. were low, but in Canada, Texas topped the daytime ratings charts for many weeks. The last episode of Texas aired on December 31, 1982.

In March 1983, Long became head writer of CBS Daytime's Guiding Light, and Gail Kobe, Long's former executive producer at Texas, joined the show in the same role.

Long created several key characters on Guiding Light, including vixen Reva Shayne, complicated Alexandra Spaulding, and rough-around-the-edges ingenue Harley Davidson Cooper. Long left her role as head writer in 1985, but returned for a second stint from 1987 to 1990. She had stints as head writer for several other daytime soap operas during her career.

Long was creator and executive producer of the prime-time drama Second Noah for ABC, for which she won the Child Advocate Award. She also wrote and produced the critically acclaimed Christy for CBS, winning the Templeton Prize. Numerous pilot developments, TV movies and a feature film followed, as well as writing and producing the first scripted drama series for MTV, Undressed, with Roland Joffe.

Long was named lead consultant for the launch of all of MTV's scripted dramas, and was executive producer and head writer for PAX's Twice in a Lifetime, winning multiple Gemini nominations, including best drama.

In 2015, Long was writer and executive producer of the film Dolly Parton's Coat of Many Colors which garnered over 15 million viewers its first showing, NBC's highest ratings for a film in seven years.

== Personal life ==
Long was once married to actor Jay Hammer and was credited for a time as Pamela Long Hammer. They had two sons together.

== Positions held ==
Guiding Light

- Head Writer: November 21, 1983 – January 20, 1984; September 10, 1987 - December 21, 1990
- Co-Head Writer:
  - (with Richard Culliton): May 2 – November 18, 1983
  - (with Jeff Ryder): January 23, 1984 – February 21, 1986
  - (with James E. Reilly): December 24, 1990 – January 11, 1991

One Life to Live

- Head Writer: March 30, 1998 – December 31, 1998

Santa Barbara

- Head Writer: February 25, 1992 – January 15, 1993

Search for Tomorrow

- Executive Story Consultant: July 28 – December 26, 1986;

Texas

- Actress: February 1981 to December 1982
- Head and Script Writer: October 1982 to December 1982

Her Hidden Truth

- Script Writer: November 1995
- Producer: November 1995

Second Noah

- Producer

== Awards and nominations ==
Daytime Emmy Awards

- Wins: 1986 & 1990, Best Writing, Guiding Light
- Nominations: 1985 & 1989, Best Writing, Guiding Light

Writers Guild of America Award

- Nominations: 1985 & 1989 seasons, Guiding Light; 1993 season, Santa Barbara
