= Stephen Herek =

American film director (born 1958)

- Born: November 10, 1958 (age 67); San Antonio, Texas, U.S.
- Occupations: Film director; producer; screenwriter
- Years active: 1986–present
- Notable work: Critters; Bill & Ted's Excellent Adventure; The Mighty Ducks; The Three Musketeers; Mr. Holland's Opus; 101 Dalmatians

Stephen Herek (born November 10, 1958) is an American film director. Born in San Antonio, Texas, he studied film at the University of Texas at Austin. He is best known for directing the 1989 film Bill & Ted's Excellent Adventure.

== Career ==
His career as a film director took off in 1986 with the cult horror classic Critters followed by the hit comedy Bill and Ted's Excellent Adventure in 1989. He then directed Don't Tell Mom the Babysitter's Dead in 1991 and became a regular director for The Walt Disney Company throughout the decade, helming The Mighty Ducks in 1992, The Three Musketeers in 1993, the highly successful live-action 1996 remake of 101 Dalmatians starring Glenn Close, and the Eddie Murphy comedy Holy Man in 1998. He also directed the critically acclaimed drama Mr. Holland's Opus in 1995.

In the 2000s, Herek directed the 2001 movie Rock Star, a film about a rockstar wannabe and his favorite rock group, Steel Dragon, starring Mark Wahlberg and Jennifer Aniston. After the underwhelming performances of Life or Something Like It in 2002 and Man of the House in 2005, Herek has stayed mainly in the television and direct-to-DVD market, directing films like Picture This, Into the Blue 2: The Reef, and The Chaperone, as well as two Dolly Parton TV specials.

== Filmography ==
=== Film ===
Director

Year	Title	Notes
1986	Critters	Also writer
1989	Bill & Ted's Excellent Adventure	
1991	Don't Tell Mom the Babysitter's Dead	
1992	The Mighty Ducks	
1993	The Three Musketeers	
1995	Mr. Holland's Opus	
1996	101 Dalmatians	
1998	Holy Man	Also producer
1999	Black Sabbath: Time Machine	Short film/music video
2001	Rock Star	
2002	Life or Something Like It	
2005	Man of the House	
2008	Picture This	Direct-to-video
2009	Dead Like Me: Life After Death	Direct-to-video
2009	Into the Blue 2: The Reef	Direct-to-video
2011	The Chaperone	
2015	The Great Gilly Hopkins	
2021	Afterlife of the Party	
2023	Dog Gone	
2024	Our Little Secret	

Executive producer

- Reverse Runner (2012)

=== Television ===
TV movies

- The Gifted One (1989)
- Young MacGyver (2003)
- The Cutting Edge: Fire and Ice (2010)
- Jinxed (2013)
- Dolly Parton's Coat of Many Colors (2015)
- Dolly Parton's Christmas of Many Colors: Circle of Love (2016)
- Same Time, Next Christmas (2019)

TV series

Year	Title	Notes
2002	The Mind of the Married Man	Episode "The Pony Ride"
2013	Dallas	Episode: "False Confessions"
2013	Lucky 7	Episode "All In"
2014	Betrayal	Episode "Sharper Than a Serpant's Tooth..."
2015	Rush Hour	Episode "The Dark Night"
2015–2016	Hawaii Five-0	3 episodes
2016–2018	MacGyver	7 episodes Also co-executive producer of 40 episodes

== Awards and nominations ==
Year	Title	Association	Results
1988	Critters	Fantasporto Award for Best Film	Nominated
1990	Bill & Ted's Excellent Adventure	Fantasporto Award for Best Film	Nominated
1997	Mr. Holland's Opus	Christopher Award for Motion Pictures	Won
2014	Jinxed	DGA for Outstanding Directorial Achievement in Children's Programs	Nominated
2016	Dolly Parton's Coat of Many Colors	Christopher Award for TV & Cable Programs	Won
2016	Dolly Parton's Coat of Many Colors	Georgia Film Critics Association Award for Excellence in Georgia Cinema	Nominated
2016	The Great Gilly Hopkins	Heartland Film Award for Truly Moving Picture award	Won
2016	Dolly Parton's Coat of Many Colors	MovieGuide Award for Most Inspiring TV Program	Won
2017	Dolly Parton's Christmas of Many Colors: Circle of Love	MovieGuide Award for Most Inspiring TV Program	Won
