= Elizabeth Castelli =

American professor of religion and author

Academic background
- Education: Brown University; Claremont Graduate School

Academic work
- Discipline: Religious studies
- Institutions: Barnard College

Elizabeth Castelli is an author and Professor of Religion at Barnard College. She specializes in biblical studies, late ancient Christianity, feminist studies in religion along with theory and method in the study of religion, with a particular focus on the after-effects of biblical and early Christian texts, including the citation of the Bible and ancient Christian sources in debates concerning cultural and political expression.

Castelli is an Editorial Director of The Marginalia Review of Books, a channel of the Los Angeles Review of Books She is also on the advisory board of the Center for Religion and Media at New York University, on the board of the Brooklyn Institute for Social Research, and a member of the board of the Center of Constitutional Rights.

== Education ==
Castelli attended Brown University, where she earned an Honors Bachelor in English and American Literature in 1979, and Claremont Graduate School, where she earned her Masters and Doctorate in Religion during 1986 and 1987, respectively. For her Doctorate Castelli focused on Christian origins.

== Career ==
During her early career Castelli worked as an executive director on domestic violence on the Rhode Island Council and a staff coordinator at Brown University from 1979-1981. She then worked as an instructor at Mount St. Mary's College in the spring of 1987 and as an assistant professor at three schools, including College of Wooster, University of California at Berkeley and at Occidental College, all in the department of Religious Studies.

Castelli is a professor in the department of Religion at Bernard College. She began working at the college in 1995 as an assistant professor, became an associate professor in 2002 and a professor in 2013.

=== Academic and professional honors ===
- Studiorum Novi Testamenti Societas, elected, August 2000
- "Society of Biblical Literature, Committee on the Status of Women in the Profession", Senior Scholar as Mentor Award, November 2001
- Gladys Brooks Excellence in Teaching Award, Barnard College, Spring 2002
- American Society of the Study of Religion, elected, April 2007

== Publications ==
=== Books, edited collections and screenplays ===
- Imitating Paul: A Discourse of Power. Literary Currents in Biblical Interpretation Series. Louisville, KY: Westminster/John Knox Press, 1991
- The Postmodern Bible. Co-editor and co-author as member of the Bible and Culture Collective. New Haven: Yale University Press, 1995.
- Reimagining Christian Origins: A Colloquium Honoring Burton L. Mack. Edited with Hal Taussig. Philadelphia: Trinity Press International, 1996.
- Women, Gender, Religion: A Reader. Edited with the assistance of Rosamond C. Rodman. New York: Palgrave/St. Martin’s Press, 2001.
- Interventions: Activists and Academics Respond to Violence. Edited with Janet R. Jakobsen. New York: Palgrave/Macmillan, 2004.
- Martyrdom and Memory: Early Christian Culture Making. New York: Columbia University Press, 2004. Paperback edition, 2007.
- Pier Paolo Pasolini, Saint Paul: A Screenplay. Authorized English translation from Italian. London: Verso Books, 2014.

=== Special issues of scholarly journals ===
Special issues of scholarly journals by Elizabeth Castelli
2001	"Sexuality in Late Antiquity", guest editor with Daniel Boyarin, Journal of the History of Sexuality 10:3-4 (July/October 2001) University of Texas Press
2004	"Reverberations: On Violence", guest editor, Scholar & Feminist Online 2:2 (Winter 2004) Barnard Center for Research on Women
2007	"God and Country", guest editor, Differences: a Journal of Feminist Cultural Studies 18.3 (Fall 2007) Duke University Press
2017	"Queer/Religion", guest editor, Scholar & Feminist Online 14.2 (Winter 2017) Barnard Center for Research on Women
