= Mark Leggett =

American composer (born 1954)

Mark Leggett is an American guitarist/composer who has composed music for hundreds of television and documentary productions in the United States.

Leggett's credits include television series My Name Is Earl, theme music for The Pretender (Emmy nominated), the Dolly Parton television film Coat of Many Colors, and the independent feature film American Romance.

Documentary credits include Anne Frank's Holocaust, Conquistador: A Day In Their Lives (Emmy nominated), Nazi America: A Secret History, and Wage Slaves: Not Getting By in America, as well as many other broad-ranging documentary series and programs.

Past work includes scoring the Werner Herzog narrated film Dinotasia, composing theme music recorded by Levon Helm and The Band, and scoring documentaries with guitarist/songwriter Richard Thompson.

In 2023, he released Guitars & Blackbirds, an album of Beatles covers, and Folkstown, his first album of original acoustic guitar compositions.
