= The Conversations =

2002 book by Michael Ondaatje

The Conversations: Walter Murch and the Art of Editing Film
- Editors: Michael Ondaatje
- Language: English
- Genre: Nonfiction
- Published: 5 October 2002
- Publisher: Alfred A. Knopf
- Publication place: United States
- Media type: Paperback
- Pages: 339
- ISBN: 978-0-375-709821

The Conversations: Walter Murch and the Art of Editing Film (2002) is a book of interviews between novelist Michael Ondaatje and film editor and sound designer Walter Murch. Ondaatje met Murch when he was editing the adaptation of Ondaatje's novel The English Patient. Throughout the book, Murch offers insight into films he worked on, including The Godfather, The Godfather Part II, The Conversation, Apocalypse Now and Apocalypse Now Redux. The book is divided into five "conversations" and contains contributions from directors and producers Murch has worked with, including George Lucas, Coppola, Rick Schmidlin and Anthony Minghella and stills from the films discussed.

== Contents ==
=== First Conversation ===
Ondaatje talks to Murch about the editing of Apocalypse Now Redux, an extended version of Coppola's Apocalypse Now. Ondaatje mentions three major scenes that were cut from the original and integrated into Redux: "a medevac scene involving Playboy Bunnies; further scenes with Brando in the Kurtz compound; and a ghostly, funereal dinner and love scene at a French rubber plantation" in addition to several smaller changes: "There is more humour, and with the addition of bridges between episodes that had been cut because of time concerns the film has become less fragmentary."

Murch recalls his early interest in sound; as a child he was nicknamed "Walter McBoing-Boing" after Gerald McBoing-Boing, a cartoon character who expressed himself using sound effects. His parents bought him a tape recorder, and he became fascinated by what he could do with it. He says that upon discovering the musique concrète composers like Pierre Schaeffer, he "felt like Robinson Crusoe finding Friday's footprints in the sand." He recalls his early film influences: "The Seventh Seal was the film where I suddenly understood the concept that somebody made this film, and that there was a series of decisions that could have been different if someone else had made the film... Of course, buried in the realization that somebody made this film was the corollary that I could make a film. Godard's Breathless and Truffaut's Shoot the Piano Player reinforced this idea for me." He says that "If I had to pick one American film that had a big impact on me from that period, it would be The Hustler", particularly praising the editing by Dede Allen. The conversation returns to the editing of Apocalypse Now Redux and how it differs from the original version.

=== Second Conversation ===
Murch talks about the "Three Fathers of film": Thomas Edison, who he uses "to stand in for all the technical geniuses of early film" and also Gustave Flaubert, who showed "there's meaning to be got out of the very closely observed elements of ordinary reality" and Ludwig Van Beethoven, who found that "by aggressively expanding, contracting and transforming the rhythmic and orchestral structure of music you could extract great emotional resonance and power." He credits Flaubert and Beethoven with discovering realism and dynamism, respectively, both of which would prove important for film. Murch discusses the history of sound in film, and his efforts to reconstruct the 1894 Dickson Experimental Sound Film. He discusses the contributions to sound made by Alfred Hitchcock, whose Blackmail was the first talkie made in the UK, and Orson Welles, who "found that his radio techniques could be transposed quite well to film, and that he could combine the aesthetics of radio play and cinema. That's one of the signal contributions of his first film, Citizen Kane." Murch talks about mixing sound for The Godfather, and how he convinced the studio to keep the score Coppola commissioned from Nino Rota. They discuss the difficulties of adapting a film from a novel, based on Murch's work on adaptations of Kundera's The Unbearable Lightness of Being and Ondaatje's The English Patient.

=== Third Conversation ===
Ondaatje and Murch discuss The Conversation, the first film on which Murch edited picture. Specifically, they talk about the similarities between Murch and the film's protagonist, Harry Caul, and the voyeuristic nature of film. Regarding film music, Murch says that "music seems to function best when it channels an emotion that has already been created out of the fabric of the story and film." In The Godfather, he uses dramatic music after Michael kills Sollozzo and McCluskey, and in The Conversation, he uses David Shire's music after Harry discovers the message on the tape. Murch discusses his role in the restoration of Orson Welles's Touch of Evil. Welles wrote a 58-page memo to Universal about the editing of his film, which they disregarded. Producer Rick Schmidlin determined to re-edit it according to the Welles's specifications, and after hearing Murch speak on sound in film, chose him as his editor. Murch says that Welles made about fifty practical suggestions for the editing of Touch of Evil, and that he and Schmidlin were able to accommodate all of them. Regarding the restored version of Touch of Evil, Murch says, "at the time the memo didn't achieve its ends. Welles didn't get what he wanted. But forty years later we were able to do everything that he asked. It's not a completely different film, it's a more fully realized version of itself, which is what a good film should be."

=== Fourth Conversation ===
Murch discusses the merits of planning and improvisation, and how art can incorporate both. He discusses his work with Fred Zinneman on his film Julia, the first time he had worked with a director who was not of the "Film Generation", and the influence of his father, the painter Walter Tandy Murch. They discuss approaches to narrative, such as the alternating narrative of The Godfather Part II. Murch says that "Every shot is a series of thoughts, expressed visually. When a thought begins to run out of steam, that's the point at which you cut. You want that to be the moment at which the impulse to go the next scene is at its strongest, so you are propelled into it... The key, on an operational level, is that I have to be able to duplicate that flinch point, exactly, at least two times in a row. So I run the shot once and hit a mark. Then run it back, look at it, and flinch again. Now I'm able to compare: Where did I stop the first time, and where did I stop the second? If I hit exactly the same frame both times, that's proof to me that there's something organically true about that moment... This is the most significant thing that I think I do. If I had to abstract one element from the way I work, I'd say that no matter how you work as an editor, this is a good thing to do. You can have completely different approaches to everything else, but do this."

=== Last Conversation ===
Ondaatje begins by asking Murch about his one experience directing film, with Return to Oz, which Murch describes as "a fusion of the reality of Wisconsin Death Trip and the fantasy of Ozma of Oz"; it was also influenced by Willa Cather's My Antonia. They discuss the Oz books, which were an early influence on Murch. Murch discusses his work towards a notation for film editing. They close by describing the relation between film and dreams.

== Reception ==
In the Los Angeles Times, director John Boorman wrote, "This book should be required reading for anyone working in film and a pleasurable option for moviegoers who want to deepen and enrich the experience."

David Thomson called it "an excellent inquiry into film" in his entry on Murch in The New Biographical Dictionary of Film.

Devin Crawley, reviewing the book for the Quill & Quire, wrote that "The Conversations should be required reading for every aspiring writer—and anyone else involved in learning to shape a work of art."

Patricia Schultheis, a fiction writer, in her review at The Missouri Review writes, "To read Michael Ondaatje's [book] is to eavesdrop on two artists of almost boundless powers discussing their respective creative passions."

Writing for The Capilano Review, Bob Sherrin writes, "Like an elegantly edited film, The Conversations leave much room for the reader to layer comments over images, to place Murch's and Ondaatje's insights and queries against statements from Coppola, Lucas, Rick Schmidlin, and Anthony Minghella; to savour the leaps and linkages that these discussions engender; to tend the desire to read, think, reread, and rethink. The final pleasure is one that some readers will experience beyond the frame of the book itself, when they sit in a cinema and enjoy the invisible specifics that Ondaatje and Murch have revealed to them."

== See also ==
- In the Blink of an Eye, a non-fiction book by Walter Murch about film editing
- Hearts of Darkness, a documentary by George Hickenlooper and Eleanor Coppola about the making of Apocalypse Now
- The Cutting Edge: The Magic of Movie Editing, a documentary about film editing, featuring Murch
- Making Waves: The Art of Cinematic Sound, a documentary by Midge Costin about film sound, featuring Murch
- This is Orson Welles, a book of interviews between Peter Bogdanovich and Orson Welles
