= The Cutting Edge: The Magic of Movie Editing =

- DVD cover
- Directed by: Wendy Apple
- Written by: Mark Jonathan Harris
- Produced by: Wendy Apple
- Starring: Zach Staenberg; Jodie Foster; Michael Tronick; Anthony Minghella; Sean Penn; Martin Scorsese; Steven Spielberg; Quentin Tarantino
- Narrated by: Kathy Bates
- Cinematography: John Bailey
- Edited by: Tim Tobin
- Music by: Nic. tenBroek
- Production companies: TCEP, Inc.
- Distributed by: Starz Encore
- Release dates: October 12, 2004 (Hollywood Film Festival); October 20, 2004 (Japan); December 12, 2004 (United States)
- Running time: 97 minutes
- Language: English
- Budget: <$1,000,000

The Cutting Edge: The Magic of Movie Editing is a 2004 documentary film about the history and art of film editing, directed by filmmaker Wendy Apple. The film brings up many topics, including the collaborative nature of filmmaking, female representation in the editing field, and emerging technologies of the 21st century. Clips shown in the documentary were taken from feature films of the past century noted for their innovations in editing, ranging from 1903's Life of an American Fireman to 2003's Cold Mountain.

The documentary was produced in response to the 1992 documentary film on cinematography, Visions of Light, and the lack of good documentaries focusing on film editors. Apple and her executive producer, Alan Heim, struck a deal with Warner Bros. to license nearly 300 film clips for free. The documentary was filmed all over California, featuring interviews with dozens of film editors, directors, actors, and producers. These interviews were later transcribed for the Academy of Motion Picture Arts and Sciences.

The Cutting Edge premiered at the Hollywood Film Festival on October 12, 2004. The documentary later aired on the Japanese television station NHK on October 20, 2004, and was released on the premium cable channel Encore on December 12, 2004. The documentary was well-received for its choice of interviewees, especially with the stories of its director-editor collaborations. However, the film was criticized for its choice of recent films and an oversimplified history of film editing.

== Synopsis ==
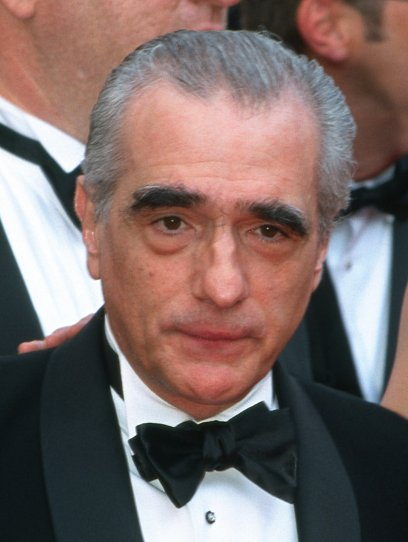
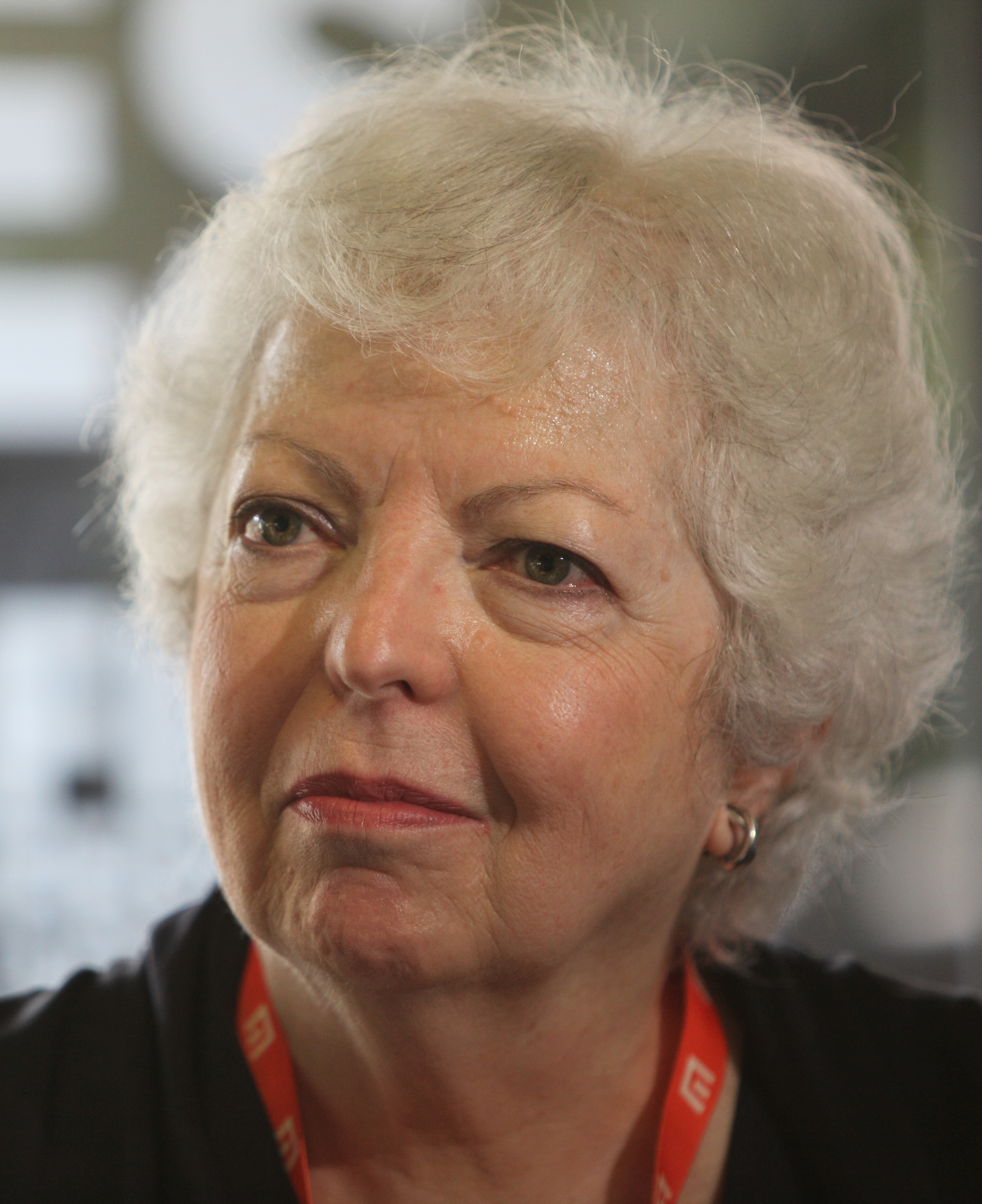
Martin Scorsese and Thelma Schoonmaker are among the director-editor collaborators appearing in the documentary. They were interviewed in March 2004.

The documentary features interviews with 30 contemporary film editors as well as 17 other individuals, including directors, actors, and producers. Throughout these interviews, many personal stories between the directors and editors are mentioned, such as Steven Spielberg and the late Verna Fields, Quentin Tarantino and Sally Menke, Martin Scorsese and Thelma Schoonmaker, and Alexander Payne and Kevin Tent, among others.

The documentary also explores the history of editing techniques, bringing up pioneers of the field such as Edwin S. Porter, D.W. Griffith, Dziga Vertov, and Lev Kuleshov, the latter of whom innovated the Kuleshov Effect. Editing techniques mentioned in the documentary include cross-cutting (shown through footage of Life of an American Fireman), close-ups and cutting on action (shown through footage of Orphans of the Storm and The Matrix), as well as jump cuts (shown through footage of Breathless). Behind-the-scenes footage of The Matrix Reloaded and Cold Mountain is showcased; the latter depicts Walter Murch standing up while he edits the film.

The documentary also notes that many early film editors were women and that their tasks were seen as similar to sewing. In the words of editor Walter Murch, "you took these pieces of fabric...and you put them together". Since the rise of sound films in the 1930s, the editing field has become dominated by men since sound was seen as more technical and electrical. Despite this, some female editors thrived. The film highlights Margaret Booth's long career as a supervising film editor. The film also features interviews with several contemporary female film editors, such as Anne V. Coates, Tina Hirsch, Lynzee Klingman, Carol Littleton, Sally Menke, and Thelma Schoonmaker.

Near the end, the documentary cites filmmaking trends of the early 2000s. These include the prevalence of quicker-cutting editing and computer-generated imagery in films, as well as the use of these technologies to simplify both previsualization and the use of virtual actors. The documentary concludes by showcasing the importance of the collaboration between the director and the film editor, especially with editors essentially "re-writing" a film already shot. Examples the documentary brings up are Kevin Tent's cutting of Alexander Payne's Election after paying $75 to the director, Alan Heim's cutting of Bob Fosse's Lenny, and Richard Marks' and Walter Murch's cutting of Francis Ford Coppola's Apocalypse Now. The documentary ends with a montage of film editors holding up their Academy Awards, as well as a speech by Robert Zemeckis after winning the "Golden Eddie Filmmaker of the Year" at the 2001 American Cinema Editors Awards.

== Production ==
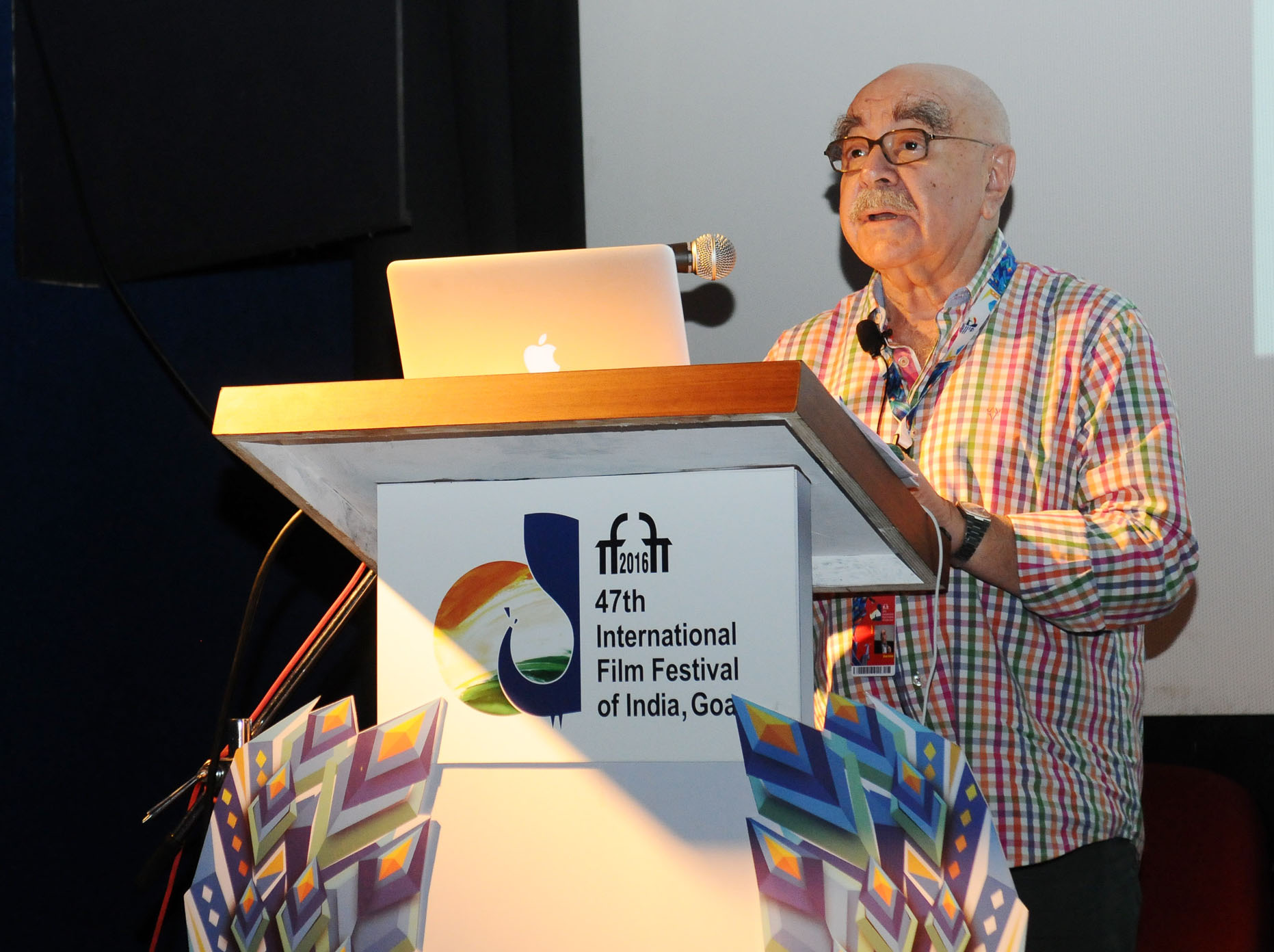
Film editor Alan Heim (pictured in 2016) was the executive producer of The Cutting Edge: The Magic of Movie Editing.

The documentary was originally conceptualized by director Wendy Apple and executive producer Alan Heim in 2001 after being inspired by the 1992 documentary film Visions of Light. Apple attempted to find any books or documentaries about film editors, but could not find any useful sources. Heim, who was the president of American Cinema Editors at the time, told CineMontage Magazine that "[i]t's the editors' shot at getting some airtime." In an attempt to secure the rights to the nearly 300 clips featured in the documentary, Apple and Heim were given the rights for free by Judith Singer. Singer, the head of clips at Warner Bros., thought the documentary was a great idea. Normally, the clips would have cost the production millions of dollars.

The budget of the documentary was less than a million dollars. An additional $20,000 was added to secure the music rights, although the filmmakers had to remove a track from the 1980 film Raging Bull. The companies that helped fund the film included the Japanese broadcasting company NHK, the Dutch channel AVRO, the BBC, Warner Home Video, and Starz Encore. NHK was particularly interested in the documentary because it was shot in high-definition. George Feltenstein, who led Warner Home Video, was extremely fascinated by the documentary due to the use of classic films. The film also featured volunteer work from students at the University of Southern California as well as the sound department from the 2004 film, The Notebook.

The documentary was shot in Los Angeles, San Francisco, and Santa Barbara. Martin Scorsese and Thelma Schoonmaker, who were working on The Aviator at the time, recorded their interviews just as the film was locked in March 2004. In an interview with CineMontage, Heim revealed that his favorite interview was with Steven Spielberg, who gave him around an hour of interesting stories for the documentary. Apple recorded over a hundred hours of interviews and sent all the transcripts to the Margaret Herrick Library, which hosted research materials for the Academy of Motion Picture Arts and Sciences.

On March 22, 2004, the documentary was announced in a press release for the HD simulcast Encore HD. The press release writes, "Encore HD features star interviews, movie trivia between films, Encore original series geared towards movie lovers".

== Films examined ==
- Life of an American Fireman (1903)
- The Great Train Robbery (1903)
- The Birth of a Nation (1915)
- Battleship Potemkin (1925)
- Man with a Movie Camera (1929)
- Triumph of the Will (1935)
- The Adventures of Robin Hood (1938)
- Schichlegruber Doing the Lambeth Walk (1942)
- Why We Fight (1942–1945)
- Vertigo (1958)
- Psycho (1960)
- The Good, the Bad and the Ugly (1966)
- Bonnie and Clyde (1967)
- 2001: A Space Odyssey (1968)
- Bullitt (1968)
- Easy Rider (1969)
- The French Connection (1971)
- Lenny (1974)
- Jaws (1975)
- The Last Tycoon (1976)
- Apocalypse Now (1979)
- Raging Bull (1980)
- Body Heat (1981)
- Places in the Heart (1984)
- The Untouchables (1987)
- The Silence of the Lambs (1991)
- Terminator 2: Judgment Day (1991)
- JFK (1991)
- Grand Canyon (1991)
- Reservoir Dogs (1992)
- Basic Instinct (1992)
- Schindler's List (1993)
- Pulp Fiction (1994)
- Under Siege 2: Dark Territory (1995)
- Home for the Holidays (1995)
- Scream (1996)
- Dante's Peak (1997)
- Titanic (1997)
- Starship Troopers (1997)
- Kundun (1997)
- The Horse Whisperer (1998)
- Out of Sight (1998)
- Election (1999)
- The Matrix (1999)
- Sleepy Hollow (2000)
- Gladiator (2000)
- Black Hawk Down (2001)
- The Fast and the Furious (2001)
- The Pledge (2001)
- Star Wars: Episode II – Attack of the Clones (2002)
- XXX (2002)
- The Matrix Reloaded (2003)
- Cold Mountain (2003)

== Cast ==
Every interviewee (listed alphabetically below) appears as themselves.

=== Film editors ===
- Dede Allen – Bonnie and Clyde (1967)
- Conrad Buff IV – Terminator 2: Judgment Day (1991) and Dante's Peak (1997)
- Donn Cambern – Easy Rider (1969)
- Jay Cassidy – The Pledge (2001)
- Richard Chew – One Flew Over the Cuckoo's Nest (1975) and Star Wars (1977)
- Anne V. Coates – Out of Sight (1998)
- Antony Gibbs – Tom Jones (1963) and Ronin (1998)
- Mark Goldblatt – Terminator 2: Judgment Day (1991)
- Alan Heim – Lenny (1974)
- Paul Hirsch – Star Wars (1977)
- Tina Hirsch – Dante's Peak (1997)
- Peter Honess – The Fast and the Furious (2001)
- Joe Hutshing – JFK (1991)
- Michael Kahn – Schindler's List (1993)
- Lynzee Klingman – Home for the Holidays (1995)
- Chris Lebenzon – Top Gun (1986) and Days of Thunder (1990)
- Carol Littleton – Body Heat (1981) and Places in the Heart (1984)
- Richard Marks – The Last Tycoon (1976) and Apocalypse Now (1979)
- Craig McKay – The Silence of the Lambs (1991)
- Sally Menke – Reservoir Dogs (1992) and Pulp Fiction (1994)
- Walter Murch – Apocalypse Now (1979) and Cold Mountain (2003)
- Tom Rolf – The Horse Whisperer (1998)
- Pietro Scalia – Black Hawk Down (2001)
- Thelma Schoonmaker – Raging Bull (1980) and Kundun (1997)
- Howard Smith – Dante's Peak (1997)
- Zach Staenberg – The Matrix Reloaded (2003)
- Kevin Tent – Election (1999) and About Schmidt (2002)
- Dylan Tichenor – Boogie Nights (1998) and The Royal Tenenbaums (2001)
- Michael Tronick – Under Siege 2: Dark Territory (1995)
- Frank J. Urioste – Robocop (1987) and Basic Instinct (1992)

=== Directors and producers ===
- Jerry Bruckheimer – Top Gun (1986) and Black Hawk Down (2001)
- James Cameron – Terminator 2: Judgment Day (1991) and Titanic (1997)
- Rob Cohen – The Fast and the Furious (2001) and XXX (2002)
- Chris Columbus – Home Alone (1990) and Harry Potter and the Sorcerer's Stone (2001)
- Wes Craven – Scream (1996)
- Joe Dante – Gremlins (1984) and Matinee (1993)
- Jodie Foster – Home for the Holidays (1995)
- Lawrence Kasdan – Body Heat (1981)
- George Lucas – American Graffiti (1973) and Star Wars (1977)
- Anthony Minghella – Cold Mountain (2003)
- Alexander Payne – Election (1999) and About Schmidt (2002)
- Sean Penn – The Pledge (2001)
- Martin Scorsese – Raging Bull (1980) and Kundun (1997)
- Ridley Scott – Gladiator (2000)
- Steven Spielberg – Jaws (1975) and Schindler's List (1993)
- Quentin Tarantino – Reservoir Dogs (1992) and Pulp Fiction (1994)
- Paul Verhoeven – RoboCop (1987), Basic Instinct (1992), and Starship Troopers (1997)

Actress Kathy Bates narrates the documentary. Editors mentioned in the documentary include Margaret Booth, Verna Fields, and Owen Marks.

== Release ==
The Cutting Edge premiered as the Hollywood Film Festival's opening film on the night of October 12, 2004. The film was later screened at the Mill Valley Film Festival on October 15–16, 2004. Afterwards, the film had a special screening at the Museum of Television & Radio on December 9, 2004. Panelists for the museum screening included director Wendy Apple with editors Carol Littleton, Craig McKay, Thelma Schoonmaker, and Tim Tobin. The documentary later premiered on Encore on December 12, 2004.

The special also premiered in Japan on October 20, 2004. It was broadcast on NHK as part of its Hi-Vision Special Feature program.

== Reception ==
The film was well received for its choice of interviewees. Jim Hemphill of American Cinematographer praised the choice of the film's interviewees. He also compared The Cutting Edge to the 1992 documentary Visions of Light, calling both films "an entertaining and inspiring overview of the history of an art form." Writing for High-Def Digest, Peter M. Bracke also praised the interviewees featured in the documentary. He also notes that it is the only high-definition bonus feature included in the Bullitt Blu-ray. Scott Foundas of Variety gave The Cutting Edge a positive review, calling it "a lively, occasionally illuminating tour" through its choice of interviewees. Foundas especially praised the documentary for highlighting director-editor collaborations, such as director Bob Fosse and editor Alan Heim in their film Lenny.

Critics also liked the personal stories and opinions told in the documentary. Gerald Perry of Boston Phoenix and Scott Foundas of Variety liked the lively stories of the profession throughout the movie, giving special note to Steven Spielberg's quote to editor Verna Fields upon cutting Jaws: "The shark would only look good at 36 frames, not 38 frames, the difference between something scary and a floating turd." Scott Foundas also humored Martin Scorsese's reaction to Goddard's Breathless, calling the use of jump cuts "too hip for me". Christopher Null liked James Cameron's one-frame removal trick seen in Terminator 2: Judgment Day. Null adds that the stories may be "all a little bit insidery and self-congratulatory," but they work well for the documentary.

Matt Roush of TV Guide Magazine praised the documentary, calling it "a celebration and history of a highly technical yet fiercely intuitive craft". He gave the documentary a perfect 10/10 score. Reviewing the DVD release of the film, Ken Korman of Sound & Vision praised the film, writing that it is more in-depth than many behind-the-scenes bonus features. He especially praised the documentary for letting editors speak, including Thelma Schoonmaker, Martin Scorsese's editor. He ended his review by writing, "You'll come away with a deeper understanding of how movie magic is made, and you'll want to watch your favorites again with new eyes." Korman gave the overall film 4/5 stars.

However, many critics felt that the history presented in the documentary was simplified. Scott Foundas noted that the choice of films weighed heavily towards the last thirty years. He also wrote that the film maintained "an academic distance" from film editing while not showcasing many possible ways to edit a single film. In particular, critics did not like the documentary's focus on Walter Murch's work on Cold Mountain. Gerald Perry of the Boston Phoenix wrote that Murch was "a bit windy," while Christopher Null wrote, "I can't help but wish it hadn't been a more exciting scene in a more noteworthy movie." In addition, Null criticized director Wendy Apple's mixed choice of movies, such as Under Siege 2: Dark Territory and XXX. But mixed with his praises towards the documentary, Null gave the film 3.5/5 stars.

=== Legacy ===
The documentary was featured on several "must-watch" lists, including /Film and 20 Minutos. The American Cinema Editors features the entire documentary on the ACE Educational Center, which is a "curated collection of instructive videos and podcasts for those in the profession of film and television editing." In an interview with KPBS in 2016, Alan Heim told Beth Accomando that the documentary had "taken me to Moscow and [...] Siberia. Willingly", adding that the film is "a very good teaching tool." Srujana Adusumilli, who edited the 2023 Indian film Mem Famous, told The New Indian Express that the documentary inspired her to become a film editor.

== Home video ==
The documentary was originally included in a 2-disc release of the 1968 film Bullitt, which was released on March 31, 2005. The documentary was also included in the Blu-ray version of Bullitt, released on February 27, 2007. The documentary was later released as a stand-alone DVD by Warner Home Video on September 6, 2005.

== See also ==
- In the Blink of an Eye (1992) – A non-fiction book about film editing by Walter Murch, one of the interviewees featured in The Cutting Edge
- Visions of Light (1992) – A similar documentary featuring interviews from cinematographers
- The Conversations (2002) – A non-fiction book by Michael Ondaatje featuring interviews with Walter Murch
- Score: A Film Music Documentary (2016) – A similar documentary featuring interviews from film composers
- 78/52: Hitchcock's Shower Scene (2017) – A film about the shower scene in the Alfred Hitchcock film Psycho, which was mentioned in The Cutting Edge
- Making Waves: The Art of Cinematic Sound (2019) – A similar documentary featuring interviews from sound designers
