= Visions of Light =

1992 documentary film

- Promotional release poster
- Directed by: Arnold Glassman; Todd McCarthy; Stuart Samuels
- Written by: Todd McCarthy
- Produced by: Terry Lawler; Yoshiki Nishimura
- Cinematography: Nancy Schreiber
- Edited by: Arnold Glassman
- Distributed by: Kino International, CBS/FOX Video (home video)
- Release date: 1992
- Running time: 92 minutes
- Countries: Japan; United States
- Language: English

Visions of Light (also known as Visions of Light: The Art of Cinematography) is a 1992 documentary film directed by Arnold Glassman, Todd McCarthy and Stuart Samuels. The film covers the art of cinematography since the conception of cinema at the turn of the 20th century. It features numerous filmmakers and cinematographers as interview subjects, presenting their views and discussing the importance of cinematography in the craft of filmmaking.

== Synopsis ==
The film includes interviews with many modern-day directors of photography and cinematographers, who illustrate via examples their best work and the scenes from films that influenced them to pursue their art. These subjects include Néstor Almendros, John Bailey, Conrad Hall, Michael Chapman, and László Kovács.

Among the pioneers they pay homage are Gregg Toland, Billy Bitzer, James Wong Howe and John Alton. The practitioners also explain the origins behind many of their most indelible images in cinema history.

== Cinematographer interviews ==
- Sandi Sissel
- Ernest Dickerson
- Michael Chapman
- Allen Daviau
- Caleb Deschanel
- Conrad Hall
- William A. Fraker
- John Bailey
- Néstor Almendros
- Vilmos Zsigmond
- Stephen H. Burum
- Charles Lang
- Sven Nykvist
- László Kovács
- James Wong Howe
- Haskell Wexler
- Vittorio Storaro
- John A. Alonzo
- Victor J. Kemper
- Owen Roizman
- Gordon Willis
- Bill Butler
- Michael Ballhaus
- Frederick Elmes

== Filmography ==
The following films are featured in clips or discussed:

- The Dickson Experimental Sound Film (1895)
- Repas de bébé (1895)
- L'Arrivée d'un train à la Ciotat (1895)
- The Kiss (1896)
- Le Spectre rouge (1907)
- The Birth of a Nation (1915)
- Intolerance (1916)
- The Cabinet of Dr. Caligari (1920)
- Way Down East (1920)
- Der Letzte Mann (1924)
- Ben-Hur (1925)
- Napoléon (1927)
- Sunrise: A Song of Two Humans (1927)
- The Crowd (1928)
- The Cameraman (1928)
- The Cocoanuts (1929)
- Applause (1929)
- The Locked Door (1929)
- Possessed (1931)
- Dr. Jekyll and Mr. Hyde (1931)
- Shanghai Express (1932)
- As You Desire Me (1932)
- What Price Hollywood? (1932)
- Red Dust (1932)
- Mystery of the Wax Museum (1933)
- Gold Diggers of 1933 (1933)
- Queen Christina (1933)
- Becky Sharp (1935)
- Peter Ibbetson (1935)
- Desire (1936)
- Camille (1936)
- Jezebel (1938)
- The Adventures of Robin Hood (1938)
- Midnight (1939)
- The Story of Vernon and Irene Castle (1939)
- The Wizard of Oz (1939)
- Gone with the Wind (1939)
- The Grapes of Wrath (1940)
- Rebecca (1940)
- The Sea Hawk (1940)
- The Long Voyage Home (1940)
- Citizen Kane (1941)
- How Green Was My Valley (1941)
- The Magnificent Ambersons (1942)
- Meet Me in St. Louis (1944)
- Mildred Pierce (1945)
- The Killers (1946)
- Out of the Past (1947)
- T-Men (1947)
- The Naked City (1948)
- Oliver Twist (1948)
- She Wore a Yellow Ribbon (1949)
- Young Man with a Horn (1950)
- Sunset Boulevard (1950)
- On the Waterfront (1954)
- The Big Combo (1955)
- The Night of the Hunter (1955)
- Picnic (1955)
- Sweet Smell of Success (1957)
- Touch of Evil (1958)
- Jules et Jim (1962)
- Lawrence of Arabia (1962)
- Hud (1963)
- Who's Afraid of Virginia Woolf? (1966)
- The Professionals (1966)
- Cool Hand Luke (1967)
- In Cold Blood (1967)
- The Graduate (1967)
- 2001: A Space Odyssey (1968)
- Rosemary's Baby (1968)
- Easy Rider (1969)
- Midnight Cowboy (1969)
- The Conformist (1970)
- McCabe & Mrs. Miller (1971)
- The French Connection (1971)
- The Godfather (1972)
- Fat City (1972)
- Chinatown (1974)
- The Godfather Part II (1974)
- The Day of the Locust (1975)
- Jaws (1975)
- Dog Day Afternoon (1975)
- Taxi Driver (1976)
- Eraserhead (1977)
- Annie Hall (1977)
- Star Wars (1977)
- Days of Heaven (1978)
- Apocalypse Now (1979)
- Raging Bull (1980)
- E.T. the Extra-Terrestrial (1982)
- Blade Runner (1982)
- Mishima: A Life in Four Chapters (1985)
- Blue Velvet (1986)
- The Last Emperor (1987)
- Empire of the Sun (1987)
- The Unbearable Lightness of Being (1988)
- The Last Temptation of Christ (1988)
- Do the Right Thing (1989)
- Goodfellas (1990)

== Reception ==
On the review aggregator website Rotten Tomatoes, 95% of 20 critics' reviews are positive, with an average rating of 8.4/10.

=== Awards ===
Wins

- New York Film Critics Circle Awards: NYFCC Award; Best Documentary; 1993.
- Boston Society of Film Critics Awards: BSFC Award Best Documentary; 1993.
- National Society of Film Critics Awards: NSFC Award; Best Documentary; 1994.

Nominations

- American Cinema Editors: Eddie; Best Edited Documentary, Arnold Glassman; 1994.

== See also ==
- Cinematographer Style (2006)
- No Subtitles Necessary: Laszlo & Vilmos (2008)
- The Cutting Edge: The Magic of Movie Editing (2004) – A similar documentary featuring interviews from film editors
- Score: A Film Music Documentary (2016) – A similar documentary featuring interviews from film composers
- Making Waves: The Art of Cinematic Sound (2019) – A similar documentary featuring interviews from sound designers
