= This Is Orson Welles =

Book by Orson Welles

This is Orson Welles
- Editor: Jonathan Rosenbaum
- Author: Orson Welles; Peter Bogdanovich
- Language: English
- Genre: Biography; Filmmaking
- Publisher: HarperCollins
- Publication date: September 1992
- Publication place: United States
- Media type: Print (Hardcover), Audiobook
- Pages: 533 pp. (first edition)
- ISBN: 0-06-016616-9

This Is Orson Welles is a 1992 book by Orson Welles and Peter Bogdanovich that comprises conversations between the two filmmakers recorded over several years, beginning in 1969. The wide-ranging volume encompasses Welles's life and his own stage, radio, and film work as well as his insights on the work of others. The book was edited after Welles's death, at the request of Welles's longtime companion and professional collaborator, Oja Kodar. Jonathan Rosenbaum drew from several incomplete drafts of the manuscript and many reel-to-reel tapes, most of which had already been transcribed. Much of the dialogue, however, had been rewritten by Welles, often in several drafts.

In addition to more than 300 pages of interviews, the book includes an annotated chronology of Welles's career, a summary of the alterations made to Welles's 1942 drama The Magnificent Ambersons and notes on each chapter by Rosenbaum.

A second edition of This Is Orson Welles was published in paperback in 1998, with a new introduction by Bogdanovich and excerpts of a 58-page memo Welles wrote Universal Pictures about the editing of his 1958 film Touch of Evil, in which he made close to fifty practical suggestions. The studio disregarded Welles's memo, but in 1998 editor Walter Murch reedited the film according to Welles's specifications.

The 1992 audiobook version of This Is Orson Welles was nominated for a Grammy Award for Best Spoken Word or Non-Musical Album.

== Origin ==
In 1961 Peter Bogdanovich organized a retrospective of Orson Welles's films, the first in the United States, for the Museum of Modern Art. Welles was not able to attend — he was in Europe, preparing a film — but he did read the monograph Bogdanovich had written to accompany the screening and was favorably impressed by it. In 1968 Welles phoned Bogdanovich to invite him for coffee at the Beverly Hills Hotel. Over the space of two hours the two filmmakers found themselves completely at ease with each other. As they left the restaurant, Welles flipped through the pages of a book Bogdanovich had just written about John Ford, Welles's favorite director; Bogdanovich had brought a copy as a gift, since Welles was quoted in its pages. "Isn't it too bad," Welles said, "that you can't do a nice little book like this about me." They decided to do a book of interviews together.

"Of course it was Welles who suggested the shape of 'the book,' as we called it — we never did arrive at a title we both liked," Bogdanovich wrote. Recorded at intervals in the United States, Mexico and Europe, the interviews were not to be forced into the chronological order of Welles's life. Welles felt they should be more loosely organized, like their conversations. Bogdanovich transcribed the reel-to-reel tapes, organized the interviews into a chapter, and mailed the typed copy to Welles. Months later, Bogdanovich would get the chapter back from Welles, revised and sometimes rewritten. Some chapters were revised two or three times in this manner.

In 1974, Orson Welles cast Bogdanovich in the role of Brooks Otterlake, a successful director, in the unreleased film The Other Side of the Wind. Welles filmed partly in Bogdanovich's Bel Air home, where Welles and actress Oja Kodar lived off and on for two years. Work on the book continued intermittently through 1975; later in the 1970s the two directors "drifted apart a bit," Bogdanovich later wrote.

For a time, the book was put on hold by Welles when he received a separate offer of $250,000 to write his memoirs. "He had no choice but to agree," Bogdanovich wrote. "This was OK with me; it was his life and one of the few ways he had of getting money to pay not only for his family's expenses, but also for the real work he was doing — his many directing projects." Then, Bogdanovich wrote, the book was literally lost for five years:

Orson never did write his memoirs. Eventually, when he asked what had become of our book, it was lost somewhere in the depths of a storage facility while I was going through a personal and financial crisis (leading to bankruptcy and a kind of general breakdown in the summer of 1985, just a few months before Orson died). During one phone conversation he had said he hoped I wouldn't "just publish" the book after he was dead — implying that I knew where it was and was just hanging on to it. That upset me and so when we finally could get back into storage, and the boxes turned up, I sent all of them over to Orson — not keeping copies of anything — with a note saying, in effect, it was his life, and here it was for him to do as he saw fit. Orson called me as soon as he got it —he was very touched, he said, and thanked me profusely. He went on to explain that there wasn't much he could leave to Oja, and if anything happened to him, he was planning to will the book to her."

After Welles died in October 1985, Oja Kodar asked Bogdanovich to help prepare the book for publication. He transcribed the materials, resulting in 1,400 pages that were then edited by Jonathan Rosenbaum into the 300 pages of interviews in the book. The revised edition contains a new introduction by Bogdanovich ("My Orson") and excerpts from Welles's memo to Universal about the editing of Touch of Evil.

Welles opines on a number of topics. He says "There are only a few artists in all the arts who can be called the best without any argument. I can only think of two—Mozart and Shakespeare. . . . Velazquez, for my money, but there you can get arguments." Among directors, Welles says his favorites are John Ford and Jean Renoir. He also praises Buster Keaton ("a very great artist, and one of the most beautiful men I ever saw on the screen") and Kenji Mizoguchi, who "can't be praised enough, really."

== Reception ==
=== Reviews and commentary ===
- Todd McCarthy, Variety — The book in question, which is based on hours of conversation between Welles and Peter Bogdanovich, is one I have been eagerly awaiting for fully 20 years, since Bogdanovich first told me about it on the set of Paper Moon. ... The extravagantly rich result represents as detailed a reading of Welles' view of his own screen career as I could ever hope for. ... The publisher, HarperCollins, has simultaneously released a four-pack volume of audio cassettes under the same title that includes four hours of the Welles–Bogdanovich interview. Some of the material overlaps, but much of it is different from what can be found in the book. And, in any event, it is great just to hear Welles telling these revealing stories himself, in his deep voice and with his infectious laugh.
- Michael Dwyer, The Irish Times — A lively, entertaining and fascinating collection of conversations between Welles and the critic turned director, Peter Bogdanovich, who initiated the project partly to redress the balance after "three very damaging books" about Welles appeared in the late 1960s. ... This is the best book of its kind since François Truffaut's classic book of interviews with Alfred Hitchcock.
- The Observer — The creation of this book was itself uncannily like a Welles film: created in fragments, abandoned, then lost, then finally restored by another hand. Welles was always his own shrewdest, most lacerating analyst, as well as his most grandiloquent yarn spinner, and this is a wonderfully eloquent, elegiac book, a meditation on a 'failed' career worth dozens of orthodox successes.
- David Thomson named it one of his five favorite books on film, calling it "Endlessly fascinating, a book of record that is bursting to be a novel."
- Filmink magazine called it "one of Bogdanovich’s two stone-cold classics as a writer (the other one is Who the Devil Made It?, with an honourable mention for Pieces of Time)."

=== Awards ===
- The 1992 audiobook version of This Is Orson Welles was nominated for a Grammy Award for Best Spoken Word or Non-Musical Album.

== See also ==
- Hitchcock/Truffaut, a book of interviews between François Truffaut and Alfred Hitchcock
- The Conversations, a book of interviews between Michael Ondaatje and Walter Murch, including discussion of the restoration of Touch of Evil
- Magician: The Astonishing Life and Work of Orson Welles, a documentary by Chuck Workman featuring Bogdanovich
