= Alan Heim =

American film editor (born 1936)

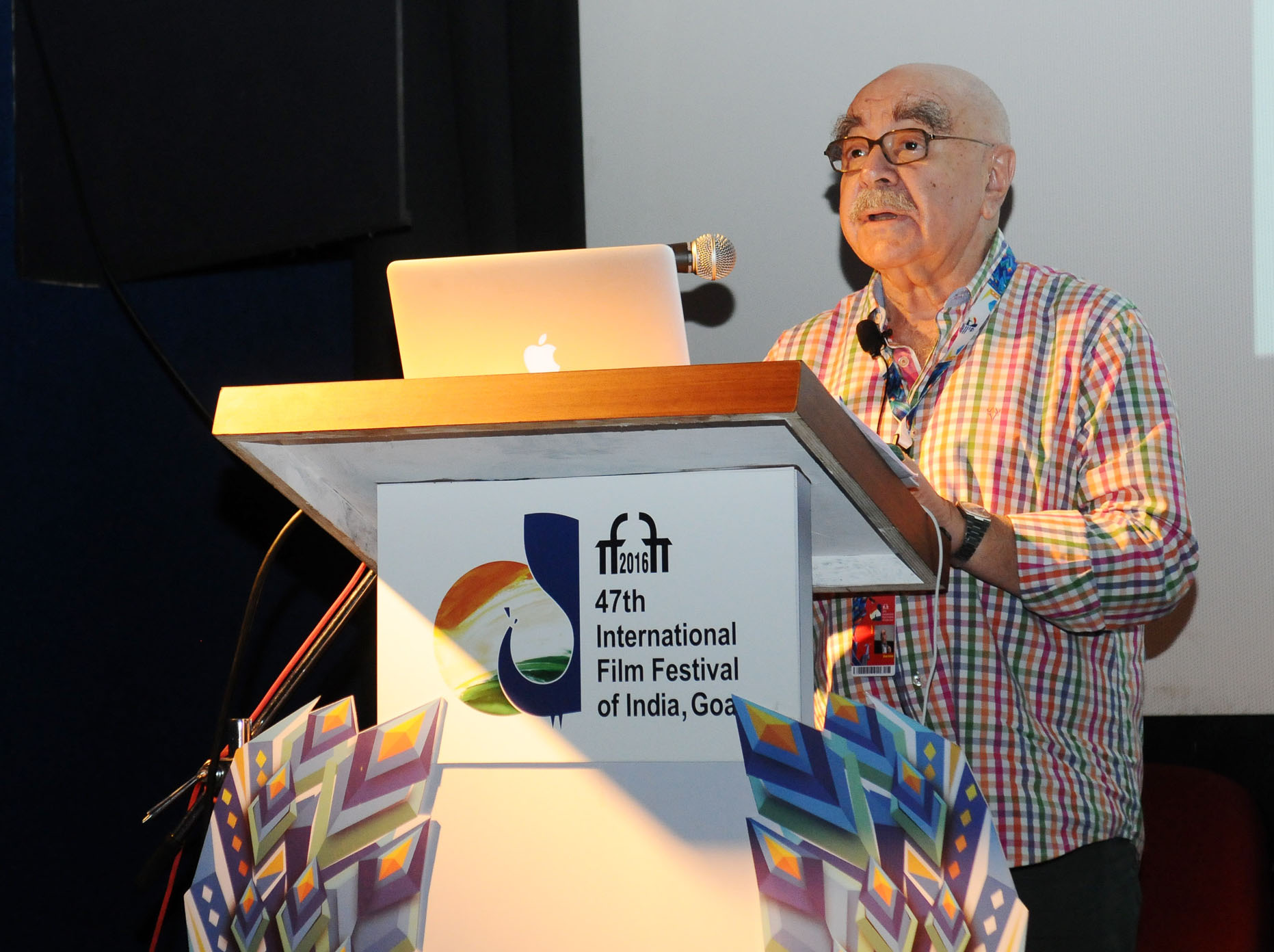
- Heim in Panaji, Goa, India, 2016
- Born: May 21, 1936 (age 89); The Bronx, New York, U.S.
- Other names: Allan Heim
- Occupation: Film editor
- Years active: 1963–present

Alan Heim, ACE (born May 21, 1936) is an American film editor. He won an Academy Award for editing All That Jazz (1979).

== Biography ==
Heim was born in the Bronx, New York.

He has more than thirty feature-film credits to his name, and has been elected to membership in the American Cinema Editors (ACE). Heim has also served as President of the ACE organization and as President of the Motion Picture Editors Guild (MPEG), the IATSE union that represents film editors, sound mixers and post-production craftspeople.

Heim had an extended collaboration with director Bob Fosse. For his work on All That Jazz (1979), Heim received the Academy Award for Best Film Editing, the BAFTA Award for Best Editing, and the American Cinema Editors Eddie Award. All That Jazz is the fourth best-edited film of all time on a 2012 list compiled by the Motion Picture Editors Guild, and Edward Ländler wrote a summary of the editing for that listing.

== Selected filmography ==
Editor
Year	Film	Director	Notes
1968	The Sea Gull	Sidney Lumet	Fourth collaboration with Sidney Lumet
1970	Last of the Mobile Hot Shots	Sidney Lumet	Fifth collaboration with Sidney Lumet
1970	The Twelve Chairs	Mel Brooks	Second collaboration with Mel Brooks
1971	Doc	Frank Perry	
1973	Godspell	David Greene	
1974	Lenny	Bob Fosse	First collaboration with Bob Fosse
1976	Network	Sidney Lumet	Sixth collaboration with Sidney Lumet
1979	Hair	Miloš Forman	First collaboration with Miloš Forman
1979	All That Jazz	Bob Fosse	Second collaboration with Bob Fosse
1981	The Fan	Edward Bianchi	
1981	So Fine	Andrew Bergman	
1983	Star 80	Bob Fosse	Third collaboration with Bob Fosse
1985	Goodbye, New York	Amos Kollek	
1985	Beer	Patrick Kelly	
1988	She's Having a Baby	John Hughes	
1988	Funny Farm	George Roy Hill	
1989	Valmont	Miloš Forman	Second collaboration with Miloš Forman
1990	Quick Change	Howard Franklin; Bill Murray	
1991	Billy Bathgate	Robert Benton	
1993	Dennis the Menace	Nick Castle	
1995	Copycat	Jon Amiel	
1997	Leave It to Beaver	Andy Cadiff	
1998	American History X	Tony Kaye	
2000	Bless the Child	Chuck Russell	
2002	The Adventures of Pluto Nash	Ron Underwood	
2003	Carolina	Marleen Gorris	
2004	The Notebook	Nick Cassavetes	First collaboration with Nick Cassavetes
2006	Alpha Dog	Nick Cassavetes	Second collaboration with Nick Cassavetes
2007	The Last Mimzy	Robert Shaye	
2009	My Sister's Keeper	Nick Cassavetes	Third collaboration with Nick Cassavetes
2010	Janie Jones	David M. Rosenthal	
2012	Bless Me, Ultima	Carl Franklin	
2013	Gods Behaving Badly	Marc Turtletaub	
2014	The Other Woman	Nick Cassavetes	Fourth collaboration with Nick Cassavetes
2015	I Saw the Light	Marc Abraham	

Editorial department
Year	Film	Director	Role
1989	Bloodhounds of Broadway	Howard Brookner	Editorial consultant
1996	The Mirror Has Two Faces	Barbra Streisand	Additional editor
2004	The Alamo	John Lee Hancock	Additional film editor
2008	Forever Plaid: The Movie	Stuart Ross	Supervising editor

Actor
Year	Film	Director	Role	Notes
1979	All That Jazz	Bob Fosse	Eddie	
2013	Return to Babylon	Alex Monty Canawati	Landlord	Scenes deleted

Music department
Year	Film	Director	Role
1966	The Fat Spy	Joseph Cates	Music editor

Sound department
Year	Film	Director	Role	Notes
1964	The Pawnbroker	Sidney Lumet	Sound editor	First collaboration with Sidney Lumet
1966	The Group	Sidney Lumet	Sound editor	Second collaboration with Sidney Lumet
1966	The Fat Spy	Joseph Cates	Sound effects editor	
1967	The Producers	Mel Brooks	Sound editor	First collaboration with Mel Brooks
1968	Bye Bye Braverman	Sidney Lumet	Sound editor	Third collaboration with Sidney Lumet
1968	Rachel, Rachel	Paul Newman	Sound editor	

Thanks
Year	Film	Director	Role
2009	The Red Machine	Stephanie Argy; Alec Boehm	Special thanks

Documentaries

Editorial department
Year	Film	Director	Role
1967	Festival	Murray Lerner	Associate editor

Producer
Year	Film	Director	Credit
2004	The Cutting Edge: The Magic of Movie Editing	Wendy Apple	Executive producer: TCEP

Sound department
Year	Film	Director	Role
1965	The Eleanor Roosevelt Story	Richard Kaplan	Sound effects editor

Thanks
Year	Film	Director	Role
2009	It Takes a Cult	Eric Johannsen	Thanks
2017	The Fabulous Allan Carr	Jeffrey Schwarz	Special thanks

TV documentaries

Editorial department
Year	Film	Director	Role
2005	Pretty Things	Liz Goldwyn	Supervising editor

TV movies

Editor
Year	Film	Director
1975	The Silence	Joseph Hardy
1978	Holocaust	Marvin J. Chomsky
1986	Nobody's Child	Lee Grant
1999	Introducing Dorothy Dandridge	Martha Coolidge
2008	Skip Tracer	Stephen Frears
2009	Grey Gardens	Michael Sucsy

TV series

Editor
Year	Title	Notes
1978	Holocaust	2 episodes

Music department
Year	Title	Role	Notes
1963−64	East Side West Side	Music editor	13 episodes
1964	Mr. Broadway	Music editor	2 episodes

Sound department
Year	Title	Role	Notes
1963	The Nurses	Sound effects Sound effects editor	5 episodes
1963−64	East Side West Side	Sound editor Sound effects editor Sound mixer	8 episodes
1964	Mr. Broadway	Sound effects editor	2 episodes
1966	ABC Stage 67	Sound editor	1 episode

TV specials

Editor
Year	Film	Director	Notes
1972	Liza with a Z	Bob Fosse	Concert film

== Awards and nominations ==
- 2012 - CameraImage Special Award - Lifetime Achievement award "Editor with Unique Visual Sensitivity"
- 2010 - American Cinema Editors ACE Eddie award winner - "Best Edited Miniseries or Motion Picture for Television" - Grey Gardens (2009) (Shared with editor Lee Percy)
- 2009 - Primetime Emmy Nomination - "Outstanding Single Camera Picture Editing for a Miniseries or a Movie" -
  Grey Gardens (2009) (shared with editor Lee Percy)
- 2000 - American Cinema Editors ACE Eddie award winner - "Best Edited Motion Picture for Non-Commercial Television" - Introducing Dorothy Dandridge
- 2000 - Primetime Emmy Nomination - "Outstanding Single Camera Picture Editing for a Miniseries, Movie or a Special" Introducing Dorothy Dandridge
- 1981 - BAFTA Award winner - "Best Editing" - All That Jazz
- 1980 - Academy Award winner - "Best Film Editing" - All That Jazz
- 1980 - American Cinema Editors ACE Eddie award winner "Best Edited Feature Film" - All That Jazz
- 1979 - American Cinema Editors ACE Eddie award nominee - "Best Edited Episode from a Television Mini-Series" - Holocaust TV series (shared with editors Stephen A. Rotter, and Brian Smedley-Aston)
- 1978 - BAFTA Award nomination - "Best Film Editing" - Network
- 1978 - Primetime Emmy Winner - "Outstanding Film Editing in a Drama Series Holocaust TV series (shared with editors Stephen A. Rotter, Robert M. Reitano, Craig McKay, and Brian Smedley-Aston)
- 1977 - Academy Award nomination "Best Film Editing" - Network
- 1977 - American Cinema Editors ACE Eddie award nominee "Best Edited Feature Film" - Network
- 1973 - Primetime Emmy Nomination - "Outstanding Achievement in Film Editing for Entertainment Programming for a Special or Feature Length Program of a Series" Liza with a Z (1972)

== See also ==
- List of film director and editor collaborations
