= Blockbuster (podcast) =

Documentary biopic podcast

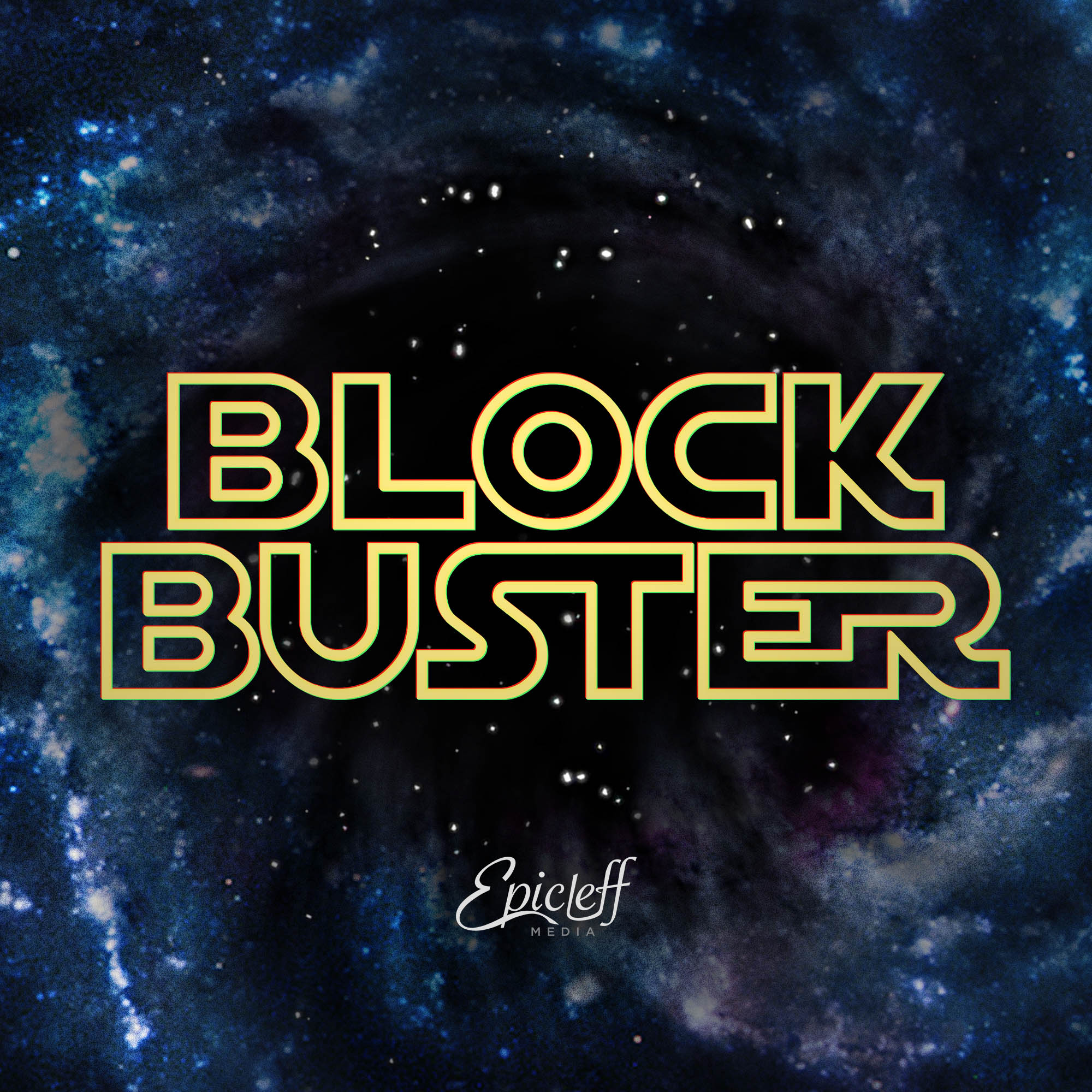
- Cover art for Blockbuster.
- Genre: Audio drama; True story biopic; Documentary

Creative team
- Created by: Matt Schrader
- Written by: Matt Schrader
- Creative director: Peter Bawiec

Cast and voices
- Starring: Ray Chase; Max Mittelman; Matthew Bohrer; Julia McIlvaine; Lex Lang

Music
- Composed by: Ryan Taubert; Benjamin Botkin

Production
- Production: Epicleff Media
- Length: Variable (20–31 minutes)

Technical specifications
- Audio format: 320kbps 48K MP3

Publication
- No. of seasons: 2
- No. of episodes: 28
- Original release: April 16, 2019
- Updates: Limited series

Related
- Website: http://GetBlockbuster.com

Blockbuster is a 2019 original dramatic podcast created by Matt Schrader detailing the friendship and rise of early Steven Spielberg and George Lucas in the 1970s Hollywood.

The series is structured like a biopic film in the years before Spielberg and Lucas came to prominence as they struggled to complete Jaws (1975) and Star Wars (1977), as well as Close Encounters (1977). It also follows the rise of composer John Williams in the years following the death of his wife, when he earned his first Academy Awards for his original scores.

The series stars Ray Chase, Max Mittelman, Matthew Bohrer, Lex Lang and Julia McIlvaine, and is narrated by Schrader, an Emmy Award-winning investigative journalist and documentary filmmaker.

== Production ==
The idea for Blockbuster began while Schrader was doing research for his film Score: A Film Music Documentary (2017). "We were really inspired in making the first scripted biopic for the podcast platform," Schrader said. "We took a large-scale 'feature film' approach to research, script development, casting, design and music, and really wanted to create a 2.5-hour movie for your ears."

The script and story for Blockbuster were finished in July 2018, according to the "making of" interviews at the end of each episode of the series. From August 2018 to April 2019, Schrader and film sound designer Peter Bawiec worked together with composers Ryan Taubert and Benjamin Botkin.

Notably, Blockbuster forgoes traditional in-episode advertisements for a more immersive experience, and instead asks listeners to consider voluntarily supporting the production via its own website.

Voice actors Ray Chase and Max Mittelman were cast to play George and Steven, respectively. Also cast were television actor Matthew Bohrer (John Williams), Lex Lang (Harrison Ford), Julia McIlvaine (Marcia Lucas), and Kenny Holmes (Sylvester Stallone).

== Episodes ==
Blockbuster premiered on all podcast platforms on April 16, 2019, and was featured by Apple Podcasts upon its release and on strategic dates, including "May The Fourth."

The six episodes of Blockbuster use a Roman numeral format as part of the title, similar to the names of the Star Wars films.

Each episode follows a chronological narrative structure over the years 1971 to 1977, with an occasional flashback scene. These flashback scenes include the world premiere of King Kong (1933) at The Chinese Theatre, 10-year-old George Lucas falling in love with Flash Gordon reruns on KRON-TV, and Steven Spielberg's first experience seeing a meteor shower with his father.

The episodes released weekly, and were preceded by an orchestral music-only track titled "Overture."

No.	Title	Length (minutes:seconds)	Original release date
1	"Episode I: The World Builders"	24:34	April 16, 2019
Steven and George become allies. A tragedy stuns composer John Williams. Producers at Universal take a risk on a big idea.
2	"Episode II: The Shark"	27:07	April 23, 2019
The open ocean devours Steven. George finds a home for his space adventure. John Williams returns to film scoring with an inspired idea.
3	"Episode III: Another World"	30:01	April 30, 2019
Jaws is an international sensation. John Williams attends the Oscars. George and Steven embark on rival projects out of this world.
4	"Episode IV: Dreams Have Limits"	29:04	May 7, 2019
George and Steven struggle with crews, imploding budgets and nature itself. A $40-million handshake. "The Star Wars" faces its biggest threat.
5	"Episode V: The Music Calls"	25:39	May 14, 2019
George invites Steven and friends for a screening. John Williams records a masterpiece. Theaters reject George's film.
6	"Episode VI: May 25, 1977"	26:53	May 21, 2019
George and Steven first meet. A startling surprise on Hollywood Boulevard. George and Steven build a sandcastle.

=== Music ===
The original score for Blockbuster employs the use of leitmotif as themes for each major character, including Steven's Theme, George's Theme and John's Theme. Schrader says he hoped to unlock a John Williams feeling in the music without imitating directly. It also merges these for dramatic effect in scenes to create unique situations and settings. Composers Ryan Taubert and Benjamin Botkin's score was praised as an immersive elements that takes listeners "into movie land" of the 1970s. Select tracks from the original score were made available as bonus content to supporters of the series.

== Reception ==
The series was announced April 11 in The Hollywood Reporter, and became a Top 10 series on Apple Podcasts during its initial release. Blockbuster was received with positive reviews.

=== Awards ===
Award	Date	Category	Result	Ref.
Adweek Podcast Awards	2019	Creativity Podcast of the Year	Won	
Adweek Podcast Awards	2020	Creativity Podcast of the Year	Won	
Webby Awards	2021	Podcasts - Best Limited Series	Honoree	
Shorty Awards	2021	Podcast Mini Series	Gold	
