= Matthew Bohrer =

American actor, writer, and producer

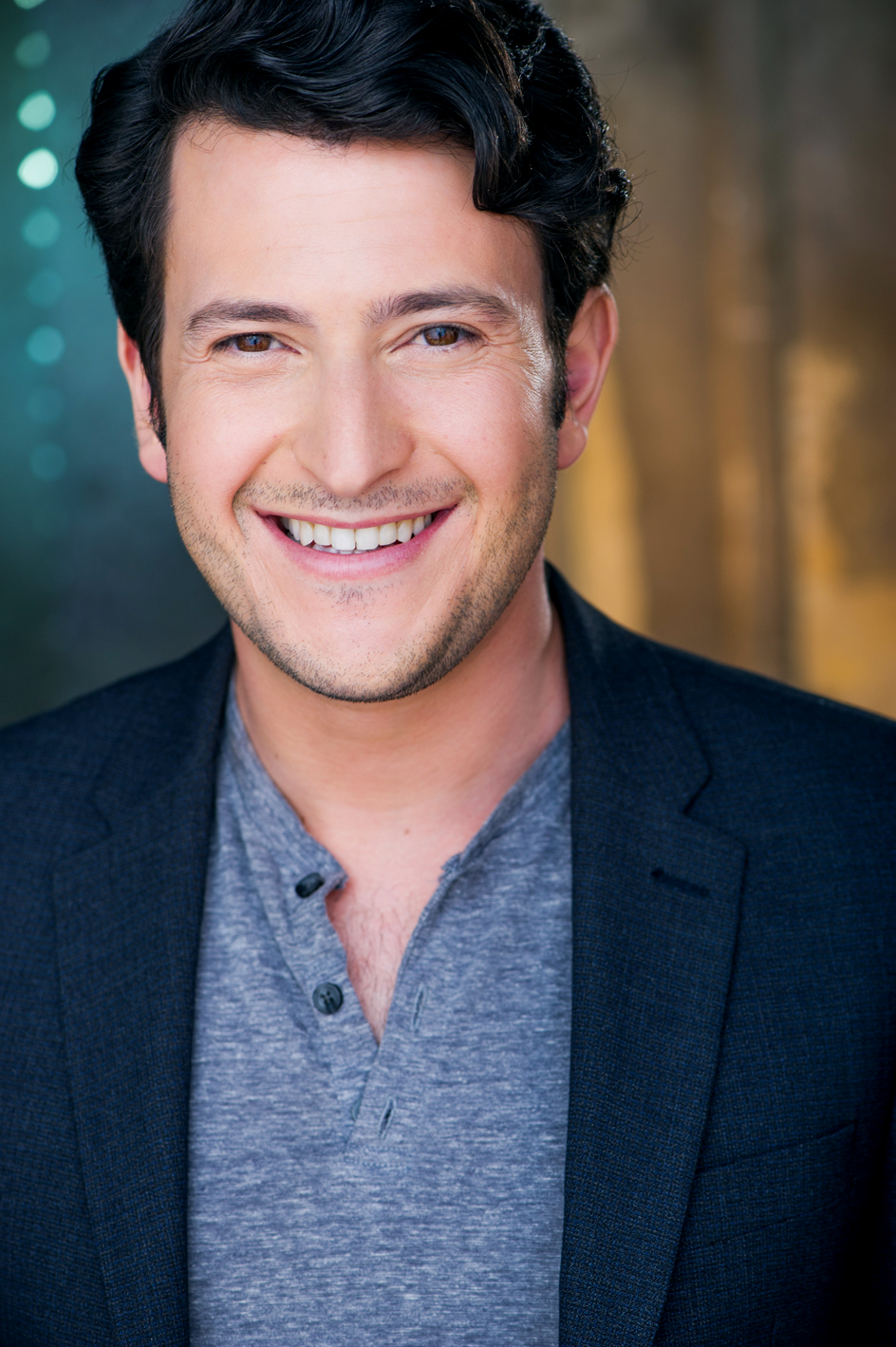
- Bohrer in 2016
- Born: San Diego, California, U.S.
- Education: Harvard University
- Website: matthewbohreractor.com

Matthew Bohrer is an American entertainment professional best known for roles in the television shows Lucifer, Goliath, and Masters of Sex. Before entering the field of law, he acted in, wrote, and produced television, film, and theater.

== Early life ==
While growing up in San Diego, Matthew Bohrer performed in multiple plays with the Playwrights Project at the Tony Award-Winning Old Globe Theatre.

Bohrer graduated from Harvard University with a B.A. in English and a minor in Dramatic Arts. While at Harvard, he was a member of the Hasty Pudding Theatricals and the Signet Society of Arts and Letters, and sang with the Krokodiloes, Harvard's oldest a cappella group. In 2025, he enrolled in UCLA School of Law in pursuit of a J.D. in Media, Entertainment, Technology & Sports Law and Policy. At UCLA, he serves as a staff editor of the UCLA Entertainment Law Review.

== Career ==
After college, Bohrer began his acting career on stage, appearing as “Eddie” in Center Theatre Group's production of The Sunshine Boys at the Ahmanson Theatre, opposite Danny DeVito and Judd Hirsch. He returned to Center Theatre Group in the world premiere of Marjorie Prime at the Mark Taper Forum.

On screen, Bohrer's notable roles include AUSA Ira Fuchstein opposite Billy Bob Thornton in David E. Kelley's Amazon series Goliath. He also played aspiring sex therapist Roger Fleming opposite Lizzy Caplan and Betty Gilpin on the award-winning Showtime drama, Masters of Sex.

Bohrer's other television credits include Lucifer, Grown-ish, Modern Family, Grey's Anatomy, Scandal, House of Lies, and I Didn't Do It, and has played hot-shot attorney "Henry Sullivan" on General Hospital since 2014. He made his feature film debut in the Universal release, Unfriended. He also starred as renowned physicist Richard Feynman in the film, D'Arline, which received a Sloan Foundation award, and played the title role of a Romanian Holocaust survivor in the award-winning film, Elie's Overcoat.

Bohrer has also maintained a presence in the Los Angeles theater scene, winning plaudits for roles such as "Josh" in the Rockwell musical production of Clueless, "Petty" in Disasteroid at Sacred Fools Theater, and "Romeo" in Romeo and Juliet.

== Filmography ==
Selected filmography

Year	Title	Role	Notes
2021	Teach Me, Bitch!	Josh	Series Lead, Creator
2014-2021	General Hospital	Henry Sullivan	Recurring Role
2020	Lucifer	Donovan Glover	Episode: Lucifer! Lucifer! Lucifer!
2019	Blockbuster	John Williams	Podcast
2019	Grown-ish	Alex Kirschbaum	Episode: Better
2018	Modern Family	Kevin	Episode: A Sketchy Area
2017	Five Minutes	Burt	Short Film
2016	Masters of Sex	Roger Fleming	Episode: In to Me You See
2016	Goliath	Asst. U.S. Atty. Ira Fuchstein	Recurring Role
2016	D'Arline	Richard Feynman	Short Film
2016	Successful People	Todd	Episode: Successful People Are A$$holes
2015	Masters of Sex	Ted	Episode: The Excitement of Release (Deleted Scene)
2015	I Didn't Do It	Tim Thomas	Episode: The Doctor is In
2015	House of Lies	Idiot Employee	Episode: Praise Money! Hallowed Be Thy Name
2014	Scandal	Male Staffer	Episode: The State of the Union
2014	Unfriended	Matt	
2014	Grey's Anatomy	Reporter Byron	Episode: Fear (of the Unknown)
