= In the Blink of an Eye (Murch book) =

Film editing book by Walter Murch

- 2nd Edition
- Author: Walter Murch
- Language: English
- Subject: Filmmaking, Film Editing
- Publisher: Silman-James Press
- Publication date: 1992; 2001 (second edition)
- ISBN: 978-1879505629

In the Blink of an Eye: A Perspective on Film Editing is a 1992 non-fiction filmmaking book on the art and craft of editing authored by Walter Murch. The book suggests editors prioritize emotion over the pure technicalities of editing. According to The Film Stage, the book “is often considered the essential literary source on film editing.”

The book is based on a transcription of a lecture Murch gave about editing in 1988. In 2001, it was revised to reflect changes in digital editing.

In particular, Murch uses his experience editing The English Patient to explore the digital side of editing.

Much of the book references experiences Murch had editing The English Patient, Apocalypse Now, and The Godfather.

== See also ==
- The Conversations (2002) – A book by Michael Ondaatje featuring interviews with Walter Murch
- The Cutting Edge: The Magic of Movie Editing (2004) – Features Walter Murch as an interviewee
