= Score: A Film Music Documentary =

- Theatrical release poster
- Directed by: Matt Schrader
- Written by: Matt Schrader
- Produced by: Robert Kraft; Trevor Thompson; Kenny Holmes; Nate Gold; Jonathan Willbanks
- Starring: Danny Elfman; Hans Zimmer; James Cameron; Quincy Jones; Rachel Portman; Trent Reznor
- Cinematography: Kenny Holmes; Nate Gold
- Edited by: Matt Schrader; Kenny Holmes
- Music by: Ryan Taubert
- Production company: Epicleff Media
- Distributed by: Gravitas Ventures
- Release dates: October 8, 2016 (Hamptons International Film Festival); June 16, 2017
- Running time: 93 minutes
- Country: United States
- Language: English
- Box office: $101,382 (United States)

Score: A Film Music Documentary is a 2016 American documentary film directed by Matt Schrader about film scores, featuring Hans Zimmer, Danny Elfman, John Williams, Quincy Jones, Rachel Portman, Trent Reznor, and others. The film was released theatrically by Gravitas Ventures on June 16, 2017, and on Blu-ray and download on September 5, 2017.

The film inspired Score: The Podcast, a weekly show on Apple Podcasts hosted by the producers and featuring prominent Hollywood composers as guests, which launched on April 3, 2018.

== Cast ==
Schrader and the filmmakers interviewed more than 60 composers, directors, orchestrators, agents, executives and experts for the documentary. Schrader says he started with the idea of having only three composers featured, but realized the diversity of musical opinions present in the film composing world.

=== Film composers ===
- Hans Zimmer
- Danny Elfman
- John Williams
- Quincy Jones
- Rachel Portman
- Trent Reznor
- Steve Jablonsky
- Brian Tyler
- Bear McCreary
- John Debney
- Joe Kraemer
- Marco Beltrami
- Howard Shore
- Alexandre Desplat
- Harry Gregson-Williams
- Thomas Newman
- Patrick Doyle
- Atticus Ross
- John Powell
- Mark Mothersbaugh
- Dario Marianelli
- Trevor Rabin
- Henry Jackman
- Jerry Goldsmith
- Max Richter
- Christophe Beck
- Tyler Bates
- David Arnold
- Christopher Young
- Ennio Morricone
- David Newman
- Heitor Pereira
- Mychael Danna
- Elliot Goldenthal
- Bernard Herrmann
- Conrad Pope
- Alfred Newman
- Joseph Trapanese
- Max Steiner
- Mervyn Warren
- Christopher Lennertz
- Deborah Lurie
- J. Ralph
- Buck Sanders
- John Barry
- J.A.C. Redford
- Alex North
- Junkie XL

=== Directors ===
- James Cameron
- Garry Marshall
- Steven Spielberg
- Christopher Nolan
- George Lucas

=== Other cast ===
- Leonard Maltin
- Jon Burlingame
- Robert Kraft
- Moby
- Siu-Lan Tan
- Amos Newman
- Robert Townson
- Mitchell Leib
- Paul Broucek
- Doreen Ringer Ross
- Shawn LeMone

== Production ==
In 2014, director Schrader left his career as an investigative journalist for CBS News to pursue a feature documentary about film composers. Bankrolling budget camera lenses and editing equipment from his own savings, Schrader recruited friends to join his team, including producers Trevor Thompson, Jonathan Willbanks and Nate Gold, and former KOVR-TV news photographer, Kenny Holmes.

In February 2015, SCORE launched a campaign on the crowdfunding website Kickstarter, which garnered attention and raised $120,930 in 30 days — more than triple the initial goal of $40,000.

Former President of Fox Music Robert Kraft joined after hearing about the project, and by early 2016, Schrader had completed more than 60 interviews with composers, directors, orchestrators, agents and more in the film music industry.

The film was acquired by Gravitas Ventures, which released it in theaters June 2017, earning $101,382 box office in the United States. The film was then released on Blu-ray, DVD and digital in September 2017, and was the #1 iTunes documentary for four consecutive weeks.

The film's website says it is available in other territories including Estonia, Finland, Iceland, Japan, Latvia, Lithuania, Norway, Sweden, Spain, Austria, Australia, Denmark, Germany, Italy, Liechtenstein, Luxembourg, Netherlands, South Korea, Switzerland, United Kingdom and Israel.

== Reception ==
=== Critical reception ===
Score received positive reviews from critics. Film review aggregator Rotten Tomatoes reported that 91% of critics gave it a positive review, based on 35 reviews with an average rating of 7.1/10. The website's critical consensus reads, "Score: A Film Music Documentary offers a long-overdue look at an integral component of cinema whose abbreviated overview of the subject should only leave viewers ready for more." On Metacritic, the film has a weighted average score of 67 out of 100, based on 9 critics, indicating "generally favorable reviews".

Gary Goldstein of the Los Angeles Times called the film "a feast for the eyes and ears," while film critic Richard Roeper of the Chicago Sun-Times said Score was "a celebration of the artists who create the musical heartbeat of the movies we love." Critic and historian Leonard Maltin (who appears in the film) said Schrader produced "a cohesive and fascinating film", adding the film "doesn’t miss a beat." The New York Times selected the film as a Critics Pick in June 2017.

=== Awards ===
Score premiered at the Hamptons International Film Festival in October 2016 and won awards at eight film festivals, including the Boulder International Film Festival, Chicago Critics Film Festival, Cleveland International Film Festival, Gasparilla International Film Festival, Nashville Film Festival, Newport Beach Film Festival, Sedona Film Festival and Tacoma Film Festival. It was also an official selection to the 2017 San Francisco International Film Festival. In October 2017, the film was nominated for the Hollywood Music in Media Awards in the Music Documentary category.

Score was named Best Documentary at the 2017 Chicago Critics Film Festival.

== See also ==
- Visions of Light (1992) – A similar documentary featuring interviews from cinematographers
- The Cutting Edge: The Magic of Movie Editing (2004) – A similar documentary featuring interviews from film editors
- Making Waves: The Art of Cinematic Sound (2019) – A similar documentary featuring interviews from sound designers
