= Web of Stories =

Video-story website

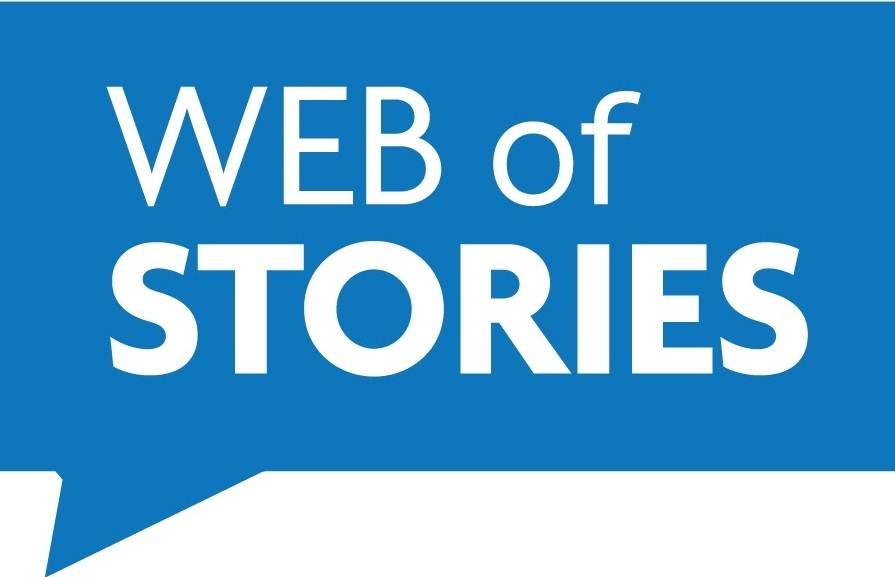
- Available in: English
- Website: webofstories.com

Web of Stories is an online collection of thousands of autobiographical video-stories. Web of Stories, originally known as Science Archive, was set up to record the life stories of scientists. When it expanded to include the lives of authors, movie makers, artists and others, it was renamed Peoples Archive, finally evolving to become Web of Stories in 2008.

The website features the video recordings of a broad range of the acknowledged leaders of our time telling their life stories. People recorded include: biologists Francis Crick and James Watson, physicist John Wheeler, neurologist Oliver Sacks, film editor Walter Murch, and authors Doris Lessing and Philip Roth, who are included among the 16 Nobel Prize winners, 19 Fellows of the Royal Society, 4 Pulitzer Prize winners, and 3 Academy Award winners.

Web of Stories is based in London.
