= The New Biographical Dictionary of Film =

Reference book by David Thomson (1975)

- Cover of the 2004 paperback edition, featuring a still from the film To Have and Have Not
- Author: David Thomson
- Language: English
- Genre: Film criticism, reference work
- Publisher: Knopf
- Publication date: November 16, 2004
- Publication place: United States
- Pages: 1008
- ISBN: 0-375-70940-1
- OCLC: 57691971
- Dewey Decimal: 791.4302/8/0922 22
- LC Class: PN1998.2 .T49 2004
- Preceded by: A Biographical Dictionary of Film, Third Edition
- Followed by: The New Biographical Dictionary of Film, Fifth Edition

The New Biographical Dictionary of Film is a reference book written by film critic David Thomson, originally published by Martin Secker & Warburg Ltd in 1975 under the title A Biographical Dictionary of Cinema.

Organized by personality, it is an almost exhaustive inventory of those involved in international cinema, whether contemporary or historical, elite or esoteric, "from Abbott and Costello to Crumb's Terry Zwigoff", in the words of critic Richard Corliss. By the fifth edition, Thomson had expanded his scope to include a film composer (Bernard Herrmann), a graphic artist (Saul Bass), a critic (Pauline Kael), a sound designer (Walter Murch), a cinematographer (Gordon Willis) and even an animal actor (Rin Tin Tin) who he thinks are among the best in their fields, as well as writers like James Agee, Graham Greene, Harold Pinter and Tom Stoppard who have written for or about film. Beyond its scope, the tome is most notable for infusing subjectivity into its fact-based form; the technique may best be described as a playful deconstruction of the "reference book." Thomson's writing is highly personal, as he mixes biography and criticism with his own memories of seeing the films he describes: "The Third Man has one of the most intense atmospheres the screen has ever delivered—seeing it again always brings back the scent of the grandmother who took me to see it." It is currently available in its sixth edition, released in May 2014.

The New Biographical Dictionary of Film has garnered wide acclaim throughout the releases of its various editions; in a 2010 poll by the British Film Institute in Sight & Sound, it was voted the greatest of all books about film. Roger Ebert wrote that "When a great star or a director dies, critics all over the world haul down David Thomson's big Biographical Dictionary of Film, because it does the best job in the fewest words of summing up the essence of its hundreds of subjects", citing Thomson's entry on Robert Mitchum.

== Overview ==
Although it looks very much like a dictionary or encyclopedia, each of the book's roughly 5,000 brief biographical sketches is highly subjective; a typical entry may begin with a birthplace and filmography, but concludes with something closer to criticism and memoir, as the author examines his connection to the subject's career both academically and personally.

Of Cary Grant, he writes: "There is a major but very needed difficult realization that needs to be made about Grant—difficult, that is, for many people who like to think they take the art form of film seriously. As well as being a leading box-office draw for some thirty years, the epitome of the man-about-town, as well as being the ex-husband of Virginia Cherell, Barbara Hutton, Betsy Drake, and Dyan Cannon, as well as being the retired actor, still handsome executive of a perfume company—as well as all these things, he was the best and most important actor in the history of the cinema." Thomson makes no attempt to hide his preferences; he begins his piece on Angie Dickinson by writing "The author is torn between his duty to everyone from Throlod Dickinson to Zinneman and the plain fact that Angie is his favorite actress." The book is notable for the attention given to supporting and character actors; in his entry on John Cazale, Thomson writes that "In heaven, I hope, there will be no stars, just supporting actors. And one of the great strengths of American film is such people."

The entries range in length from a few sentences to several pages. They are written in various forms; Thomson's piece on W. C. Fields begins with an imagined letter from Charles Dickens to Wilkie Collins about the death of Fields, as Fields acted in adaptations of Dickens, was something of a Dickensian character, and because he died on Christmas: "Nor could even your own ingenuity for narrative, my dear Collins—and you know what honest admiration I have for it—begin to trace the anxiety with which Fields hid away his money in some several hundred separate bank accounts, nor invent the strange names in which those accounts were lodged."

Thomson is notable for his literary style, which often imitates his subjects, and for his humor. His entry on Hoagy Carmichael imagines how Howard Hawks asked Carmichael to appear in To Have and Have Not. Thomson looks at images and themes that feature in a director's films; his entry on Jean Renoir describes how the image of the river recurs in his work, and closes with Rumer Godden's narration in Renoir's The River: "The river runs, the round world spins/ Dawn and lamplight, midnight, noon./ Sun follows day, night stars and moon./ The day ends, the end begins." In the entry on Michael Powell, Thomson writes: "Black Narcissus is that rare thing, an erotic English film about the fantasies of nuns."

== History ==
The Martin Secker & Warburg Ltd-published first edition—the 600-page Biographical Dictionary of Cinema—was followed by Biographical Dictionary of Film, published by William Morrow & Co in June, 1980; the third, entitled A Biographical Dictionary of Film, was released on November 17, 1994, by Andre Deutsch Ltd; 328 pages longer than the first edition, it added 200 new entries, including Molly Ringwald.

The 2004 edition was a major overhaul. Although the book's first edition contained 600 pages, the fourth was enlarged to 1,080 pages, updating older entries and adding 30 new personalities. The book's cover art was reworked, and the word "new" was added to its title. The 4th edition cover featured Lauren Bacall and Hoagy Carmichael in a scene from To Have and Have Not; the 5th edition cover had Daniel Day-Lewis in There Will Be Blood and the 6th has Marilyn Monroe from Some Like It Hot. The epigraphs come from Ingmar Bergman's autobiography The Magic Lantern and Howard Hawks's comment on Katharine Hepburn in Bringing Up Baby: "The great trouble is people trying to be funny. If they don't try to be funny, then they are funny."

In the Acknowledgments, Thomson thanks "all the people who, one way or another, have shared in the ongoing 'conversation' about movies. All at once, he realizes that he has such lively company, such friends and arguers. Moreover, the thanking has become the more enjoyable since I stumbled into the game of asking people for their favorite films." Thomson asked people involved with the book's production, fellow critics, and members of his family to name their three favorite films. In the 2010 edition, he writes "After careful tabulation, the poll (with an electorate of 72) has three favorite films in second place (with 4 votes): Vertigo, Sunrise and Madame de..., but our winner, with 5, are His Girl Friday and Citizen Kane." Thomson lists his own three favorites as His Girl Friday, Mississippi Mermaid and Celine and Julie Go Boating.
