= Matt Schrader =

American filmmaker

- Born: Burbank, California
- Education: University of Southern California
- Occupations: Filmmaker; Journalist
- Years active: 2014–present

Matt Schrader is an American filmmaker. He is best known for writing and directing Score: A Film Music Documentary (2016) and creating the biopic podcast series Blockbuster. He's credited with Emmy Award-winning investigative journalism for CBS News and NBC News. He has been nominated for various awards, including three Emmy Awards.

Score: A Film Music Documentary was one of 170 films considered for the 2018 Academy Award for Best Documentary Feature. The film won eight awards at film festivals and made $101,382 at the US box office before being released as the #1 documentary on iTunes for four weeks straight.

Schrader is executive producer of the weekly Score: The Podcast, which interviews leading composers in Hollywood about their craft.

== Early life and education ==
Schrader was born in Burbank, California, in 1988, the son of accountant Brad Schrader and former news producer Diane Bear. He grew up in Seattle, Boise, and Colorado Springs before returning to Southern California to attend the University of Southern California, where he earned degrees from both the School of Cinematic Arts and the Annenberg School for Communication and Journalism.

== Career ==
After graduating, Schrader accepted a job as an investigative news producer for CBS News in Sacramento and NBC News in Los Angeles where he won three Emmy Awards for his reports and a Golden Mike Award for editing, before leaving in 2014 to pursue principal photography for Score: A Film Music Documentary. Schrader says he spent $11,000 of his own savings to purchase the original camera equipment for Score, before launching a successful crowdfunding campaign on Kickstarter that raised over $120,000 for the film’s production. Distributor Gravitas Ventures acquired Score in January 2017 and released it theatrically June 16, 2017. The film earned $101,382 at the US box office and became the #1 documentary on iTunes for four consecutive weeks.

After the release of Score, Schrader created the original podcast drama series Blockbuster, which premiered on April 16, 2019.

== Filmography ==
- Score: A Film Music Documentary (2016)
- Mosul (2019)
