= Midge Costin =

Hollywood sound designer

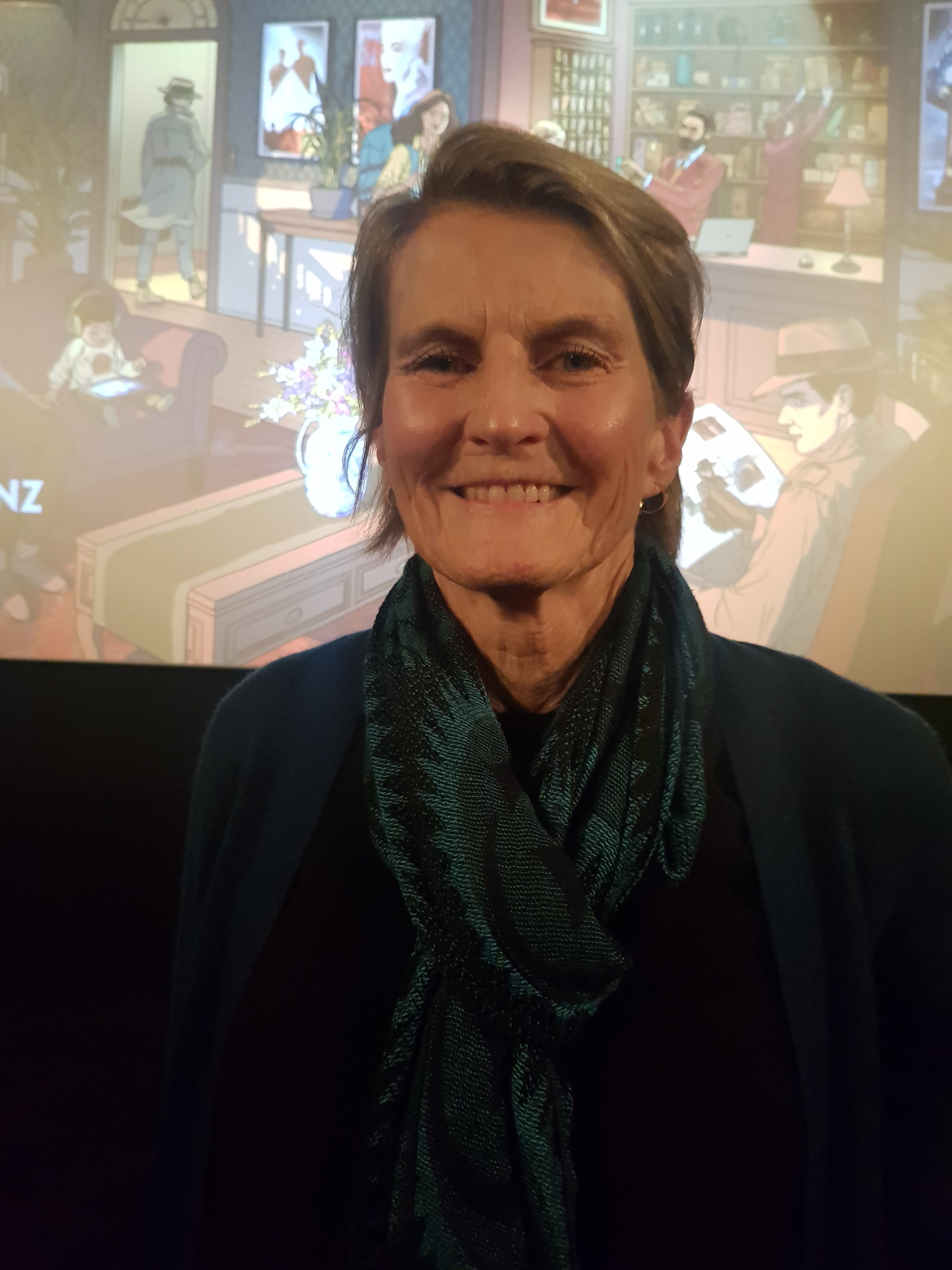
I mage of Midge Costin at the New Zealand International Film Festival

Midge Costin is a retired Hollywood sound designer on action movies in the 1990s. She is now a professor in the School of Cinematic Arts at the University of Southern California.

== Education ==
Costin is originally from Massachusetts, and studied for her degree in art history at Smith College in the state. In 1982, she gained a masters in cinema production at the USC School for Cinematic Arts.

== Hollywood career ==
Costin's first professional job in Hollywood was on Ridley Scott's Days of Thunder. She "had the bad guys' car," doing the sound effects for any car challenging Tom Cruise. At that time there were few women cutting sound effects in Hollywood and the work led to a career in loud action-adventure movies. Other credits include Cry-Baby (1990), Dead Again (1991), Crimson Tide (1995), The Rock (1996) and Armageddon (1998). She has been nominated several times for Golden Reel Awards from the Motion Picture Sound Editors and Crimson Tide won for Best Feature Film Sound Editing.

== Personal life ==
Costin is a lesbian.

== Academic career ==
In 2000, Costin took up a teaching post at USC School for Cinematic Arts. Five years later, she became the first holder of the Kay Rose professorship in the art of sound editing, a chair endowed by George Lucas and Steven Spielberg. In 2019, she produced and directed the "wonkishly engaging" feature documentary Making Waves: The Art of Cinematic Sound, which explores innovation in film sound.

In 2005, Costin was a member of a world champion surf kayaking team.

== Externals links ==
- Midge Costin at IMDb
- Making Waves website.
