= Walter Tandy Murch =

Canadian born American painter (1907–1967)

Gravity Experiment 1961

Enlarged Doll 1965

Walter Tandy Murch (August 17, 1907 – December 11, 1967) was a painter whose still life paintings of machine parts, brick fragments, clocks, broken dolls, hovering light bulbs and glowing lemons are an unusual combination of realism and abstraction. His style of painting objects as though they are being seen through frosted glass has been compared to 18th-century painters such as Chardin, while his oddly marred and pitted surfaces tend to evoke the 20th-century's abstract expressionists. He is the father of sound designer and film editor Walter Scott Murch and Louise Tandy Schablein.

== Life and career ==
Murch was born and grew up in Toronto, Ontario, the son of Clara Louise (Tandy) and Walter Murch. He attended the Ontario College of Art in the mid-1920s, studying under Arthur Lismer, a member of the Group of Seven, a group of Impressionist to Post-Impressionist painters mostly active from 1910 to 1940. Murch moved to New York City in 1927 and studied at the Art Students League of New York under Kenneth Hayes Miller and later, with Arshile Gorky at the Grand Central School of Art.

In 1929 he married Katharine Scott, and from then until 1950 Murch supported himself and his family through a number of jobs on the fringes of the art world including department-store window design, book illustration, restaurant murals, freelance illustrations (notably covers for the magazines Fortune and Scientific American) and advertising commissions while he continued painting and studying contemporary art. In 1941 Betty Parsons presented Murch's first one-man exhibition at the Wakefield Gallery in New York City. When Parsons established her own gallery in the mid-1940s, Murch moved with her, mounting one-man shows every two years until his death in 1967. After 1950, he also began teaching at Pratt Institute and later at New York University, Columbia University and Boston University. In 1966, Murch had a one-man show at Lehigh University under the aegis of Francis Quirk. Later that year Daniel Robbins at The Rhode Island School of Design organized Murch's first major retrospective, a year before his death from a heart attack on December 11, 1967.

Murch's style remains difficult to classify, although he has been variously described as a Magic Realist, Surrealist, Romantic Realist or just plain Realist. For subjects, he favored motors, tools and scientific equipment which would often be incongruously arranged with more traditional still life elements such as fruit, bread and fragments of rock. These mysterious and eccentric juxtapositions seem to imply poetic associations although Murch himself tended to dismiss this sort of interpretation of his work, saying of the objects he chose to paint that they were simply an excuse to paint. This response seems perfectly appropriate because the broken surface of his work gives it a visibility equal to the virtual image (the objects depicted), which themselves are depicted with undistorted clarity and geometric precision. This creates a fascinating ambiguity, and as Clement Greenberg said, "ambiguity is precisely one of the largest sources of pleasure in art," from "Cézanne: Gateway to Contemporary Painting" in Clement Greenberg, The Collected Essays and Criticism Vol. 3, John O'Brian ed., The University of Chicago Press, Chicago and London, 1995, p. 117.

In 2009 and 2010, Ihor Holubizky and Bill Jeffries curated a traveling exhibit entitled: Walter Tandy Murch: The Spirit of Things. This exhibit was circulated by the Robert McLaughlin Gallery and partially funded by the Government of Canada through the Department of Canadian Heritage, Museums Assistance Program. The exhibit was displayed in the Robert McLaughlin Gallery in Toronto (Ontario) 4 July to 30 August 2009, the Confederation Centre Art Gallery in Charlottetown (Prince Edward Island) January 2010, Owens Art Gallery in Sackville (New Brunswick) 26 February to 18 April 2010, and Simon Fraser University Gallery in Vancouver (British Columbia) September 11 to October 30, 2010. A book, Walter Tandy Murch: The Spirit of Things, has been published of the traveling exhibit and is available for sale.

A Monograph of his work has been published by Rizzoli in September 2021, titled "Paintings and Drawings, 1925–1967". Contributing authors include George Lucas, Walter Scott Murch, Judy Collischan, Robert Storr, and Winslow Myers.

== Retrospective at the Brooklyn Museum, Dec 19 1967- Jan 28, 1968 ==
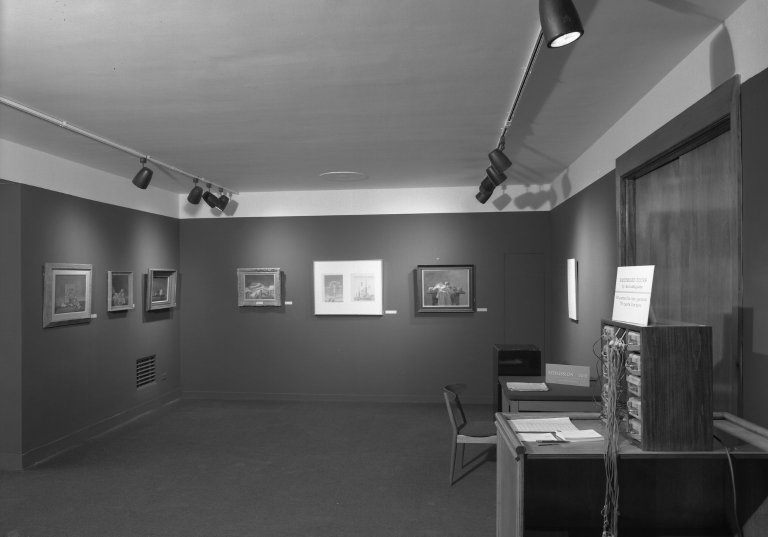
Brooklyn Museum Archives

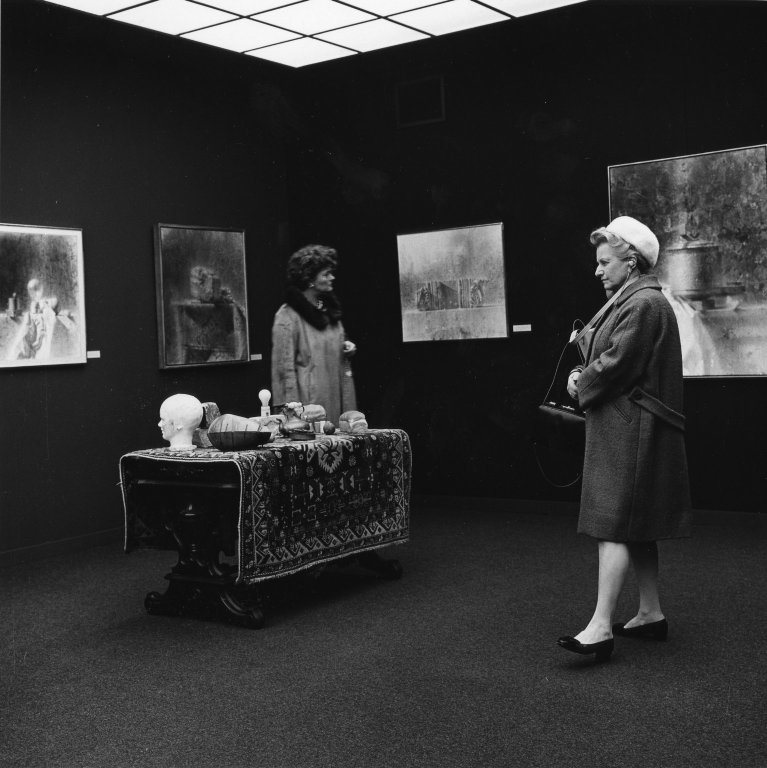
Brooklyn Museum Archives

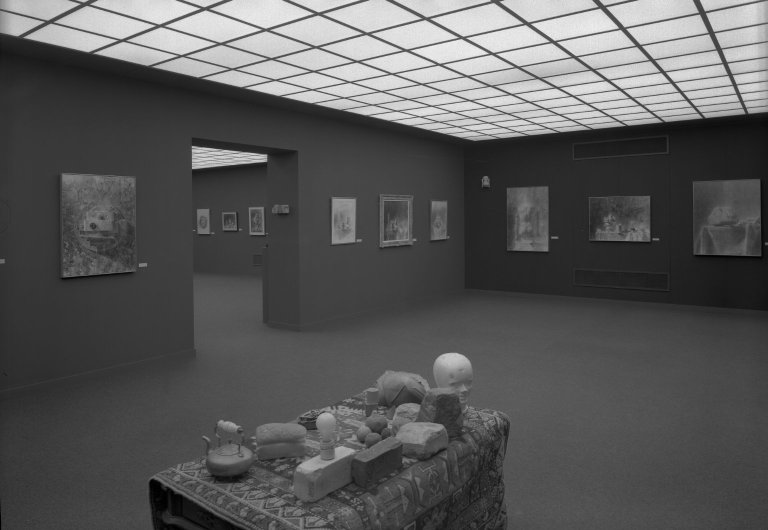
Brooklyn Museum Archives

== Sources ==
- timlowly.com - Walter Murch Biographical Timeline
