= Motion Picture Editors Guild =

American guild for film editors and others

Coordinates: 34.098266°N 118.357976°W

The Motion Picture Editors Guild (MPEG; IATSE Local 700) is the guild that represents freelance and staff motion picture and television editors and other post-production professionals and story analysts throughout the United States. The Motion Picture Editors Guild (Union Local 700) is a part of the 500 affiliated local unions of the International Alliance of Theatrical Stage Employees (IATSE), a national labor organization with 104,000-plus members. There are more than 8,000 members of the Editors Guild.

== Function ==
The MPEG negotiates collective bargaining agreements (union contracts) with producers and major motion picture movie studios and enforces existing agreements with employers involved in post-production. The MPEG provides assistance for securing better working conditions, including but not limited to, salary, medical benefits, safety (particularly "turnaround time") and artistic (assignment of credit) concerns.

== History ==
On April 12, 1937, the US Supreme Court upheld the constitutionality of the National Labor Relations Act.

On May 20, 1937, the Society of Motion Picture Film Editors was founded by I. James Wilkinson (sound editor), Ben Lewis (film editor) and Philip Cahn (film editor), when film editors earned a mere $100 per week.

On June 7 1937, membership totaled 571, men and women, as picture editors, sound editors, assistants, apprentices and librarians.

In 1938, the first contract talks garnered a 10% wage increase.

In 1943, film editors and assistant editors are offered their own local by the IATSE. Many Society members sought to align themselves with this larger national organization, hoping for greater negotiating clout. The editors, assistant editors, and sound and music editors voted to join IATSE.

In 1944, the Society of Motion Picture Film Editors underwent a name change and became the Motion Picture Editors Guild, Local 776 of the IATSE.

In 1998, at the direction of the IATSE, the Sound Technicians Union, Local 695 ceded jurisdiction of post-production sound mixers, recordists and engineers, to the Motion Picture Editors Guild. A year later Local 771 representing editors working in New York merged with, and Locals 780 and 52 ceded their respective jurisdictions of editors and sound technicians to Local 776. The greatly expanded Editors Guild now Local 700, is only the second local granted a national rather than a regional charter. By the year 2000 their ranks had been joined by the Story Analysts local and the Laboratory Film /Video Technicians-Cinetechnicians local in late 2010. Today the Motion Picture Editors Guild, Local 700 has offices in New York and Hollywood and represents more than 7000 post-production media professionals nationwide making it the second largest local in the IATSE.

== Publications ==
CineMontage Magazine is the Journal of the Motion Picture Editors Guild, IATSE Local 700. The Leader, the quarterly bulletin of the Society of Motion Picture Film Editors, was first published January 1, 1943. The Editors Guild Newsletter was launched in 1979, later changed to a magazine, and in 2000, was retitled Editors Guild Magazine.

== Archive ==
The Academy Film Archive houses the Motion Picture Editors Guild Legacy Archive Collection. The collection includes interviews focusing on the life and career history of Motion Picture Editors Guild members.
