= The Dickson Experimental Sound Film =

1894/95 American film

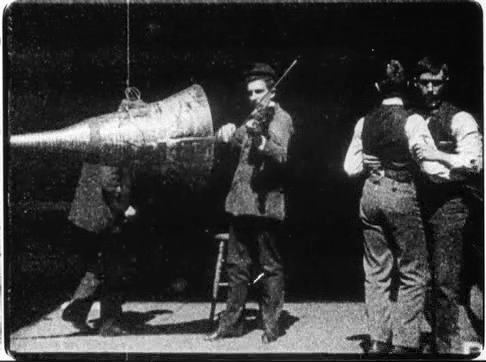
- Frame from restored version of The Dickson Experimental Sound Film (1894/95)
- Directed by: William Dickson
- Starring: William Dickson
- Cinematography: William Heise
- Music by: Robert Planquette
- Distributed by: Thomas A. Edison, Inc.
- Running time: 16 seconds
- Country: United States
- Language: English (Note: On the cylinder, before the camera starts rolling, a man's voice can be heard to say, "I asked if it's working. Is it working already? Go ahead.")

The Dickson Experimental Sound Film is a film made by William Dickson in late 1894 or early 1895. It is the first known film with live-recorded sound and appears to be the first motion picture made for the Kinetophone, the proto-sound-film system developed by Dickson and Thomas Edison. (The Kinetophone, consisting of a Kinetoscope accompanied by a cylinder-playing phonograph, was not a true sound-film system, for there was no attempt to synchronize picture and sound throughout playback.) The film was produced at the "Black Maria", Edison's New Jersey film studio. There is no evidence that it was ever exhibited in its original format.

In 2003, The Dickson Experimental Sound Film was selected for preservation in the National Film Registry of the Library of Congress, being deemed "culturally, historically, or aesthetically significant".

== Synopsis ==
The film features Dickson playing a violin into a recording horn for an off-camera wax cylinder. The melody is from a barcarolle, "Song of the Cabin Boy", from Les Cloches de Corneville (literally The Bells of Corneville; presented in English-speaking countries as The Chimes of Normandy), a light opera composed by Robert Planquette in 1877. In front of Dickson, two men dance to the music. In the final seconds, a fourth man briefly crosses from left to right behind the horn. The running time of the restored film is seventeen seconds; the accompanying cylinder contains approximately two minutes of sound, including twenty-three seconds of violin music, encompassing the film's soundtrack.

== Rediscovery ==
The Dickson Experimental Sound Film (1894)

A soundless 35mm nitrate print of the movie, described as precisely forty feet long, was acquired by the Museum of Modern Art and transferred to safety film in 1942. Thomas A. Edison, Incorporated donated the Edison Laboratory to the U.S. National Park Service in 1956. The soundtrack was inventoried at the Edison National Historic Site in the early 1960s when a wax cylinder in a metal canister labeled "Dickson—Violin by W.K.L. Dixon with Kineto" was found in the music room of the Edison laboratory. In 1964, researchers opened the canister only to find that the cylinder was broken in two; that year, as well, all nitrate film materials remaining at the facility were removed to the Library of Congress for conservation. Among the filmstrips was a print that the Library of Congress catalogued as Dickson Violin. According to Patrick Loughney, the library's film and TV curator, this print is "thirty-nine feet and fourteen frames [two frames short of 40 feet]."

== Restoration ==
The connection between the film and the cylinder was not made until 1998 when Loughney and Edison NHS sound recordings curator Jerry Fabris arranged for the cylinder to be repaired and its contents recovered at the Rodgers and Hammerstein Archive of Recorded Sound in New York. A new reel-to-reel master was created, allowing for fidelity reproduction onto digital audio tape. As the library was not equipped to synchronize the recovered soundtrack with the film element, producer and restoration specialist Rick Schmidlin suggested that award-winning film editor Walter Murch be enlisted on the project (the two had worked together on the 1998 restoration of Orson Welles's Touch of Evil). Murch was given the short piece of film and the two minutes of sound recovered from the cylinder to work with. By digitally converting the film and editing the media together, Murch synchronized the visual and audio elements. Industrial Light & Magic also had an unspecified role in the film's restoration. This version was projected on a 20' screen at the Edison National Historic Site on June 1, 2002, as part of the Black Maria Film Festival.

On the cylinder, before the camera starts rolling, a man's voice can be heard to say, "I asked if it's working. Is it working already? Go ahead." This extra sound is included on the version of the film that was distributed in the early 2000s. However, since filming had not yet begun when the words were uttered, this cannot be claimed as the first incidence of the spoken word on film.

== Uncertainty on intended frame per second ==
One question that remains unanswered is how the eventual running time of just over 17 seconds was arrived at. Per the curatorial reports, the 35-mm prints have a standard 16 frames per foot of film—39 feet (12 m) plus 14 frames thus equals a total of 638 frames. Murch describes the film as having been shot at 40 frames per second (fps); Loughney describes it as 46 fps. At 40 fps, 638 frames would run 15.95 seconds, which should be the maximum length of the restored film if all other reports are correct; as Loughney notes, at 46 fps, the film would last 13.86 seconds. If the latter figure is correct, as many as 9 seconds of film are missing from both extant prints if the entire violin performance was filmed. On the basis of his own tests of eighteen Kinetoscope films, scholar Gordon Hendricks argued that no Kinetoscope films were shot at 46 fps, making the speed of 40 fps reported by Murch more likely. The clip that runs with this Wikipedia page is ~16 seconds long, which confirms Murch's analysis. Dickson himself, in his 1895 book The History of the Kinetoscope says that the Edison camera ran at 40 fps.

== Interpretations ==
In his book The Celluloid Closet (1981), film historian Vito Russo discusses the film, claiming, without attribution, that it was titled The Gay Brothers. Russo's unsupported naming of the film has been adopted widely online and in at least three books, and his unsubstantiated assertions that the film's content is homosexual are frequently echoed. In addition to there being no evidence for the title Russo gives the film, in fact, the word "gay" was not generally used as a synonym for "homosexual" at the time the film was made. There is also no evidence that Dickson intended to present the men—presumably employees of the Edison studio—as a romantic couple. Given the lyrics of the song Dickson plays, which describes life at sea without women, it is more plausible that he intended a joke about the virtually all-male environment of the Black Maria. Also, in some areas of life it was acceptable in the 19th century for men to dance with men without homosexual overtones being perceived; all-male "stag dances," for instance, were a standard part of life in the 19th-century U.S. Army and were even part of the curriculum at West Point.

== See also ==
- Treasures from American Film Archives

== Sources ==
=== Published ===
- Dixon, Wheeler Winston (2003). Straight: Constructions of Heterosexuality in the Cinema (Albany: State University of New York Press, 2003). ISBN 0-7914-5623-4
- Hendricks, Gordon (1966). The Kinetoscope: America's First Commercially Successful Motion Picture Exhibitor. New York: Theodore Gaus' Sons. Reprinted in Hendricks, Gordon (1972). Origins of the American Film. New York: Arno Press/New York Times. ISBN 0-405-03919-0
- Loughney, Patrick (2001). “Domitor Witnesses the First Complete Public Presentation of The Dickson Experimental Sound Film in the Twentieth Century,” in The Sounds of Early Cinema, ed. Richard Abel and Rick Altman (Bloomington: Indiana University Press), 215–219. ISBN 0-253-33988-X
- Russo, Vito (1987). The Celluloid Closet: Homosexuality in the Movies, rev. ed. (New York: Harper & Row). ISBN 0-06-096132-5

=== Online ===
- Dickson Sound Film short, scholarly discussion; part of the UNLV Short Film Archive
- "The Three Fathers of Cinema & The Edison/Dickson Experiment" interview with restoration editor Walter Murch by William Kallay, September 27, 2004; part of the 'from Script to DVD' website
