= David Thomson (film critic) =

British film critic and historian

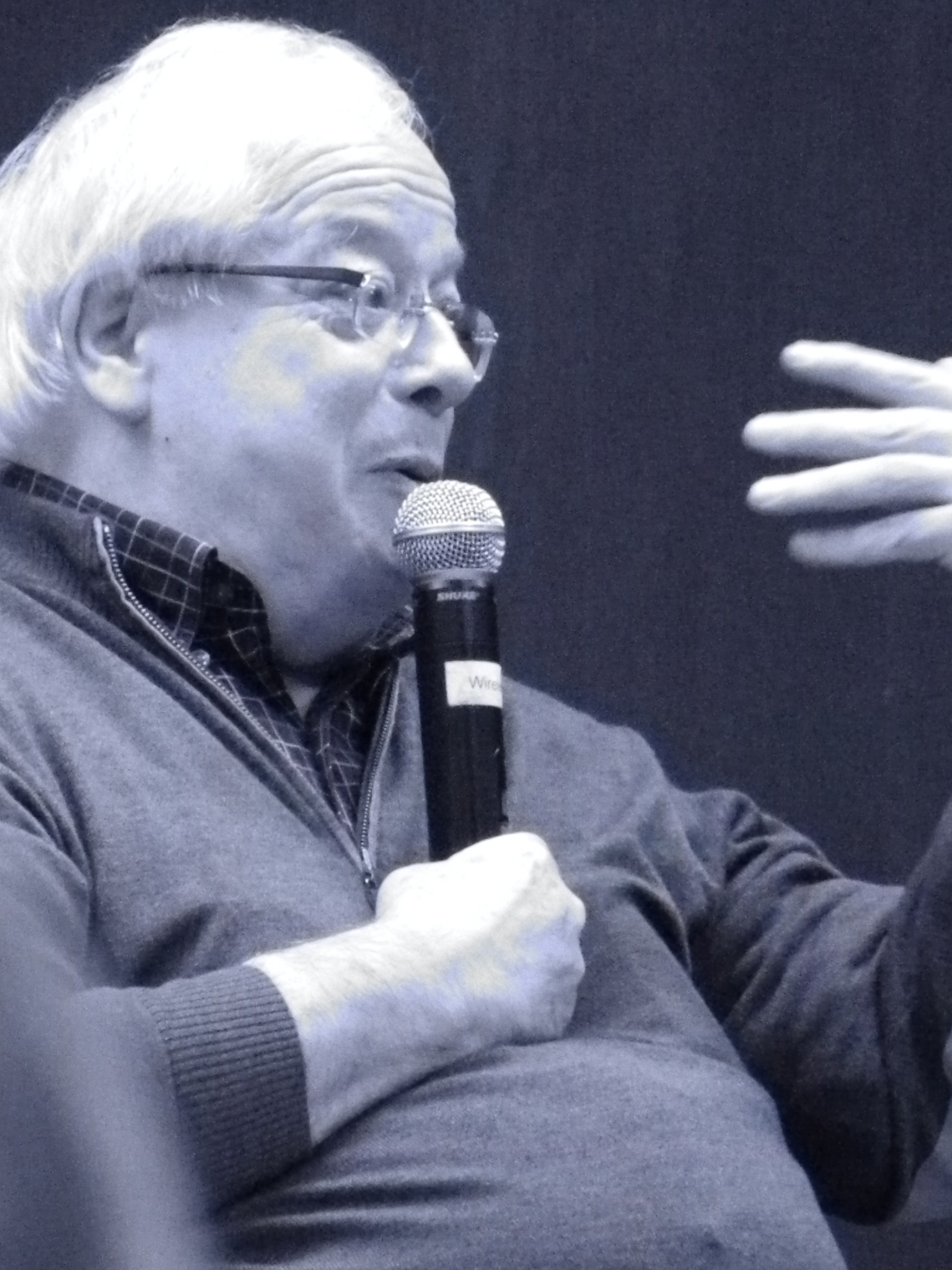
- Thomson speaking in New York, 2013
- Born: 18 February 1941 (age 85) London, England
- Occupation: Film critic; historian

David Thomson (born 18 February 1941) is a British film critic and historian based in the United States, and the author of more than 40 books.

His reference works in particular – Have You Seen...?: A Personal Introduction to 1,000 Films (2008) and The New Biographical Dictionary of Film (6th edition, 2014) – have been praised as works of high literary merit and eccentricity despite some criticism for self-indulgence. Benjamin Schwarz, writing in The Atlantic Monthly, called him "probably the greatest living film critic and historian" who "writes the most fun and enthralling prose about the movies since Pauline Kael". John Banville called him "the greatest living writer on the movies" and Michael Ondaatje said he "is our most argumentative and trustworthy historian of the screen." In 2010, The New Biographical Dictionary of Film was named the greatest book on the cinema by a poll in Sight and Sound; his novel Suspects also received multiple votes. Guillermo Cabrera Infante of The New Republic wrote "Thomson is the Dr. Johnson of film."

== Biography ==
Thomson was born in London. He was admitted to Oxford but attended the London School of Film Technique. He taught film studies at Dartmouth College, and has been a regular contributor to The New York Times, Film Comment, Movieline, The New Republic, and Salon. Thomson has served on the selection committee for the New York Film Festival, and scripted an award-winning documentary, The Making of a Legend: Gone with the Wind. In 1975, he published A Biographical Dictionary of Cinema, now in its sixth edition as The New Biographical Dictionary of Film.

Thomson helped to revive interest in the director Michael Powell (along with Emeric Pressburger, one half of the film duo the Archers.) Roger Ebert writes: "Powell was rescued from obscurity and relative poverty first by the film critic David Thomson, whose Biographical Dictionary of Film contained a glowing entry about the director. Powell wrote thanking Thomson, who invited him to teach at Dartmouth College. The trip to America led to Powell's meeting Martin Scorsese, a devotee of the Archers films since he was eleven or twelve years old, and Scorsese's editor, Thelma Schoonmaker, who eventually became Powell's wife." Thomson recalls: "Michael was very interested in trying to do a film from a novel by Ursula Le Guin. He said, 'Why don’t we do an extract from that film??' We did so, and we shot it on 35mm. He came to campus in the winter of 1980, arriving in a pink Harris tweed suit. He was, you know, a great, eccentric character. He possessed absolute assurance. He was not really interested in the academic process per se, but I think he knew that if he acted the way he wanted, bright students would learn a great deal from it, which is really what happened. They shot an extract, and it was an amazing time. We also ran a series of his films, and he began writing his autobiography while he was at Dartmouth. His presence on campus was a major event in the lives of people who went on to big careers, like Chris Meledandri of Illumination. Meledandri actually made a film about Michael at Dartmouth, a short documentary."

Thomson penned Suspects (1985), a metafictional work imagining the secret histories of film noir characters like Sunset Boulevard's Norma Desmond and Chinatown's Noah Cross. Charles Champlin called Suspects "the wildest and most imaginative use of the movies as material I have ever read." Graham Fuller named it one of his favorite books on film, saying "Thomson was a historian writing like a novelist and so it was logical that he would eventually weave fiction with history in the serpentine Suspects, from which one can learn more about the iconography of film noir than from many worthy textbooks." In 1990, he followed it with Silver Light, which mixes real and fictional people from the history of the Western; Publishers Weekly notes that the "cast includes Willa Cather, Montgomery Clift, Charles Ives, Judge Roy Bean and numerous characters smuggled in from such movies as The Man Who Shot Liberty Valance and McCabe & Mrs. Miller. Thomson has written screenplays, including Fierce Heat, which was to be produced by Martin Scorsese and directed by Stephen Frears. He recalls "I wrote a script for Scorsese, which was a very enjoyable experience. It didn’t get made, although I think it helped lead him to Casino. It was about Las Vegas, which my wife and I love and is a totally insane, very American place." With Ian Christie, Thomson edited Scorsese on Scorsese (1989), a book of conversations with Scorsese. He went on to edit Levinson on Levinson (1992), a book of conversations with Barry Levinson. In 1997, he wrote about The Big Sleep for the British Film Institute Classics series. Publishers Weekly calls his 2026 book A Sudden Flicker of Light "a feast for cinephiles." He completed his genre trilogy with Connecticut (2023), which looks at charcters from screwball comedy.

Thomson has written several biographies, notably Rosebud: The Story of Orson Welles (1996). Thomson has written books that combine biography and fiction, such as Warren Beatty and Desert Eyes (1987), which combines a biography of Warren Beatty with speculative fiction. Publishers Weekly wrote that "Thomson's analysis of Beatty's work is perceptive" but criticized the "silly futuristic story of a California peopled with earthquake survivors." Champlin called the book "stunning and unprecedented." He has also written a controversial book about Nicole Kidman, which Peter Conrad wrote "slithers from critical observation to subjunctive daydreaming", including ventures into "territory best left to pornography." Lawrence Levi called it a "weird and unseemly mash note."

In The New Biographical Dictionary of Film, Thomson memorializes his friend Kieran Hickey, a documentary filmmaker. Thomson wrote some of Hickey's films, including Faithful Departed, a short documentary on the Dublin of James Joyce's Ulysses. Thomson credits Hickey with shaping his book: "I do not mean to shift the responsibility. Kieran helped in the research on all editions of this book; he commented and improved it at every page. But his deepest contribution was to the years of talk, the climate of taking pictures seriously, that made me think this book possible. If you feel the urge to talk back to this book, then know that Kieran paved the way." Hickey died in 1993, and Thomson writes that "in a way I feel the movies are over now that he's gone."

He has confessed that he prefers writing books to film writing.

Thomson lives in San Francisco with his wife and sons. In 2014, the San Francisco International Film Festival announced that Thomson would receive the Mel Novikoff Award at their 57th annual festival. This is given to those making significant contributions to the Bay Area's film community. He has turned his interest to television, writing Breaking Bad: The Official Book (2015) and Television: A Biography (2016).

== Favorite films ==
Thomson participated in the Sight and Sound poll in 2002, 2012 and 2022. In 2002, he prefaced his list with a "Love You, Too" to Sunrise, The Passenger, The Umbrellas of Cherbourg, In a Lonely Place, L'Atalante, Madame de..., The Red Shoes, Point Blank, Persona, The Lady Eve, The Awful Truth, The Shop Around the Corner, Rear Window, Meet Me in St. Louis, Pat Garrett and Billy the Kid, The Night of the Hunter, The Eclipse, Providence, Belle de Jour, Chinatown, Mulholland Drive and "just about everything by Howard Hawks except the one I will come to, eventually" before naming his top ten.

2002: Blue Velvet, Celine and Julie Go Boating, Citizen Kane, The Conformist, His Girl Friday, A Man Escaped, The Rules of the Game, Pierrot le Fou, That Obscure Object of Desire and Ugetsu Monogatari.

2012: Blue Velvet, Celine and Julie Go Boating, Citizen Kane, The Conformist, Hiroshima mon amour, His Girl Friday, Pierrot le Fou, The Rules of the Game, The Shop Around the Corner and Ugetsu Monogatari.

2022: The Big Sleep, Celine and Julie Go Boating, Citizen Kane, Fists in the Pocket, Magnolia, A Man Escaped, Pierrot le Fou, The Shop Around the Corner, The Underground Railroad and The Vietnam War.

== Bibliography ==
- Movie Man (1967)
- A Bowl of Eggs (1970)
- Hungry as Hunters (1972)
- Wild Excursions: The Life and Fiction of Laurence Sterne (1972)
- A Biographical Dictionary of Film (1975; 6th ed., 2014)
- Scott's Men (1977, reissued in 2002 as Scott, Shackleton and Amundsen)
- America in the Dark: Hollywood and the Gift of Unreality (1978)
- Overexposures: A Crisis in American Filmmaking (1981)
- Suspects (1985)
- Warren Beatty and Desert Eyes (1987)
- Silver Light (1990)
- Showman: The Life of David O. Selznick (1993)
- 4-2 (1996)
- Rosebud: The Story of Orson Welles (1996)
- Beneath Mulholland: Thoughts on Hollywood and Its Ghosts (1998)
- The Alien Quartet: A Bloomsbury Movie Guide (Bloomsbury Publishing, 1999), ISBN 1-58234-030-7, as The Alien Quartet (Pocket Movie Guide), 2000 ISBN 0-7475-5181-2
- The Big Sleep (BFI guide) (2000)
- In Nevada: The Land, The People, God, and Chance (2001)
- Hollywood: A Celebration (DK, 2001)
- Cinema: Year by Year (Intro only) (DK, 2005)
- Marlon Brando (2003)
- The Whole Equation: A History of Hollywood (2004)
- Fan Tan (introduction; a novel written by Donald Cammell and Marlon Brando) (2005)
- Nicole Kidman (2006)
- "Have You Seen...?": A Personal Introduction to 1,000 Films (2008)
- Try to Tell the Story (2009)
- The Moment of Psycho: How Alfred Hitchcock Taught America to Love Murder (2009)
- Humphrey Bogart (Great Stars) (2009)
- Ingrid Bergman (Great Stars) (2009)
- Gary Cooper (Great Stars) (2009)
- Bette Davis (Great Stars) (2009)
- The Big Screen: The Story of the Movies and What They Did to Us (2012)
- Moments That Made the Movies (2013)
- Why Acting Matters (2015)
- How to Watch a Movie (2015)
- Breaking Bad: The Official Book (2015)
- Television: A Biography (2016)
- Sleeping With Strangers: How the Movies Shaped Desire (2019)
- Murder and the Movies (2020)
- A Light in the Dark: A History of Film Directors (2021)
- Disaster Mon Amour (2022)
- Connecticut (2023)
- The Fatal Alliance: A Century of War on Film (2023)
- Remotely: Travels in the Binge of TV (2024)
- A Sudden Flicker of Light: A Revisionist History of Movies (2026)
