= Walter Murch =

American film editor and sound designer

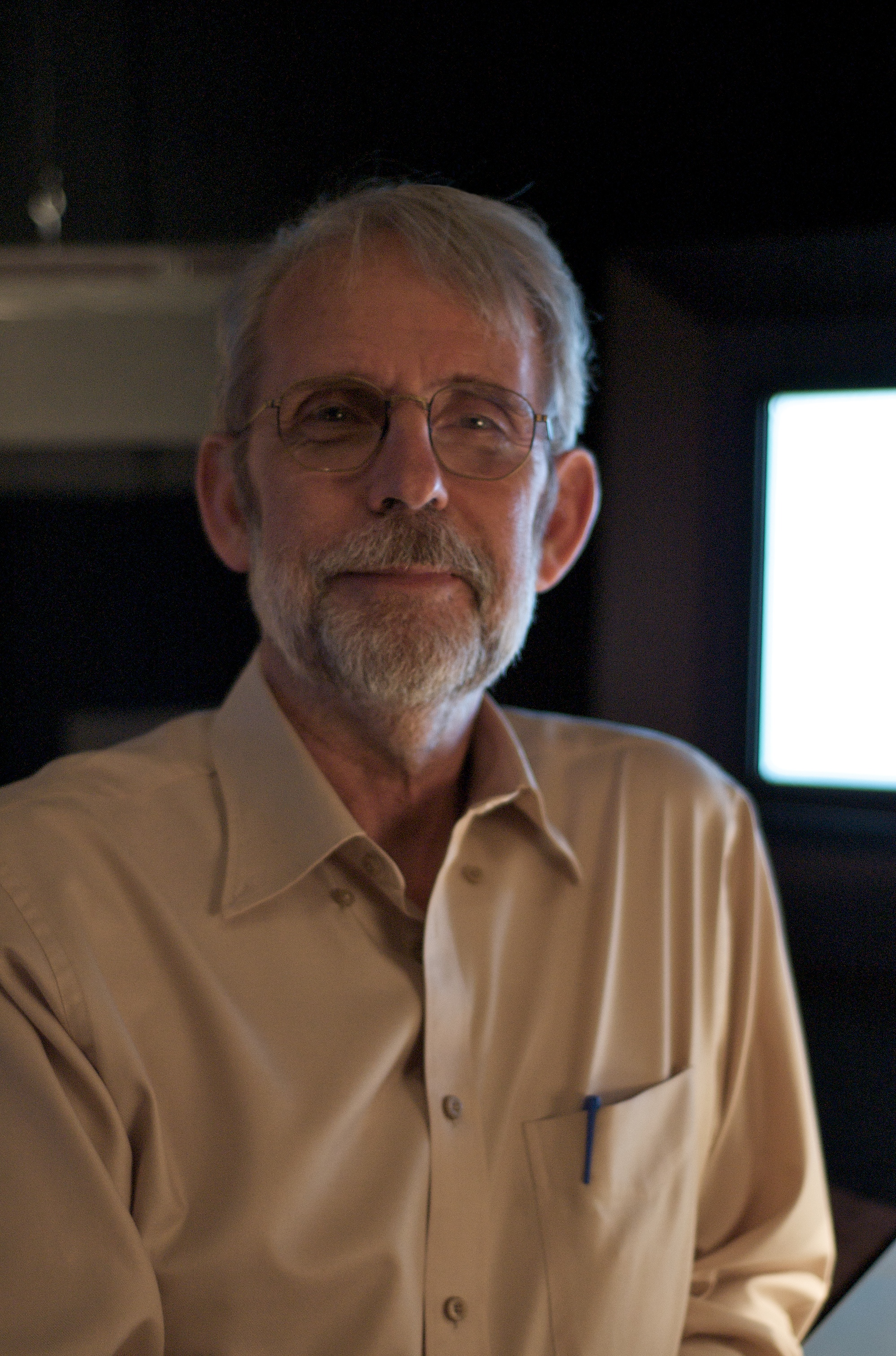
- Murch in Buenos Aires, Argentina, December 21, 2008
- Born: Walter Scott Murch; July 12, 1943 (age 83); New York City, U.S.
- Education: Johns Hopkins University; USC School of Cinematic Arts
- Occupations: Film editor; director; writer; sound designer
- Years active: 1969–present
- Spouse: Aggie Slater (m. 1965)
- Children: 4
- Father: Walter Tandy Murch

Walter Scott Murch (born July 12, 1943) is an American film editor, director, writer and sound designer. His work includes THX 1138, Apocalypse Now, The Godfather I, II, and III, American Graffiti, The Conversation, Ghost and The English Patient, with three Academy Award wins (from nine nominations: six for picture editing and three for sound mixing).

For his work on Apocalypse Now, Murch was the first person to receive a credit as "Sound Designer." Murch was also the editor and re-recording mixer of Apocalypse Now Redux. In 1998, producer Rick Schmidlin chose Murch as his editor for the restoration of Orson Welles's Touch of Evil. Murch is the author of a popular book on film editing, In the Blink of an Eye, and is the subject of Michael Ondaatje's 2002 book The Conversations. Famed movie critic Roger Ebert called Murch "the most respected film editor and sound designer in the modern cinema". David Thomson calls Murch "the scholar, gentleman and superb craftsman of modern film", adding that in sound and editing, "he is now without a peer."

== Early life and education ==
External videos
- Walter Murch, Film-maker, Web of Stories, March 1, 2017

Murch was born in New York City, New York, the son of Katharine (née Scott) and Canadian-born painter Walter Tandy Murch (1907–1967). He is the grandson of Louise Tandy Murch, a music teacher who was the subject of the 1975 documentary film At 99: A Portrait of Louise Tandy Murch and of Mary Elizabeth MacCallum Scott, a Canadian physician, educator and Christian medical missionary, who with her husband Thomas Beckett Scott MD, established the Green Memorial Hospital in Manipay, Sri Lanka (then Ceylon).

As a boy, he began to experiment with sound recording, taping unusual sounds and layering them into new combinations. He attended The Collegiate School, a private preparatory school in Manhattan, from 1949 to 1961. In the summer of 1961 he worked as a music librarian and production assistant at Riverside Church's newly founded radio station WRVR, now WLTW. He assisted with the July 29th 1961 live broadcast of a 12-hour folk music Hootenanny produced by Izzy Young. This featured, among many other acts, the first radio performance of the 20-year-old Bob Dylan. Murch then attended Johns Hopkins University from 1961 to 1965, graduating Phi Beta Kappa in the liberal arts. Murch spent the university school year 1963–1964 in Europe, studying Romance Languages and the History of Art in Italy at Perugia and in France at the Sorbonne.

While at Johns Hopkins, he met future director/screenwriter Matthew Robbins, cinematographer Caleb Deschanel, and philosopher Andrew Feenberg, with whom he staged a number of happenings. In 1965, Murch and Robbins enrolled in the graduate program of the University of Southern California's Department of Cinema, encouraging Deschanel to follow them. There all three encountered, and became friends with, fellow students such as George Lucas, Hal Barwood, Robert Dalva, Willard Huyck, Don Glut and John Milius; all of these men would go on to be successful filmmakers. Not long after film school, in 1969, Murch and others joined Francis Ford Coppola and Lucas at American Zoetrope in San Francisco. Murch and his family settled in Bolinas, California, in 1972.

== Career ==
Murch started editing and mixing sound with Francis Ford Coppola's The Rain People (1969). Subsequently, he worked on George Lucas's THX 1138 and American Graffiti and Coppola's The Godfather before editing picture and mixing sound on Coppola's The Conversation, for which he received an Academy Award nomination in sound in 1974. Murch also mixed the sound for Coppola's The Godfather Part II which was released in 1974, the same year as The Conversation. He did picture editing and sound design work on Apocalypse Now, for which he won his first Academy Award in 1979 and he was also significantly involved in the re-editing work that resulted in the extended Apocalypse Now Redux in 2001.

In 1985, he directed his only feature film, Return to Oz, which he co-wrote with Gill Dennis. After the film failed at the box office and displeased many critics with its dark and surreal imagery, he never directed another film.

In 1988, Murch was one of the editors on The Unbearable Lightness of Being, directed by Philip Kaufman.

Murch edits in a standing position, comparing the process of film editing to "conducting, brain surgery and short-order cooking" since all conductors, cooks, and surgeons stand when they work. In contrast, when writing, he does so lying down. His reason for this is that where editing film is an editorial process, the creative process of writing is opposite that, and so he lies down rather than sit or stand up, to separate his editing mind from his creating mind.

Murch has written one book on film editing, In the Blink of an Eye (1995), which has been translated into many languages including Chinese, Italian, Hebrew, Spanish, French, German, Hungarian and Persian. His book describes many of his notable techniques used in his film editing. One of his most praised techniques he refers to as "the rule of six" referring to the six criteria in a film that he examines when making a cut. In his book, Murch also describes editing as more of a psychological practice with a goal of anticipating and controlling the thoughts of the audience.

Before this, he wrote the foreword to Michel Chion's Audio-Vision: Sound on Screen (1994). He was also the subject of Michael Ondaatje's book The Conversations (2002), which consists of several conversations between Ondaatje and Murch; the book emerged from Murch's editing of The English Patient, which was based on Ondaatje's novel of the same name.

In 2007, the documentary Murch premiered at the San Francisco International Film Festival, which centered on Murch and his thoughts on filmmaking.

In 2012, Murch's translations of short stories by the Italian writer Curzio Malaparte were published as The Bird That Swallowed Its Cage.

== Innovations and awards ==
While he was editing directly on film, Murch took notice of the crude splicing used for the daily rough-cuts. In response, he invented a modification which concealed the splice by using extremely narrow but strongly adhesive strips of special polyester-silicone tape. He called his invention "N-Vis-O".

In 1979, he won an Oscar for the sound mix of Apocalypse Now as well as a nomination for picture editing. The movie was among the first stereo films to be mixed using an automated console. Additionally, the film is the first to credit anyone as Sound Designer, a professional designation that Murch is widely attributed to have coined as a means to help legitimize the field of post-production sound, much in the way William Cameron Menzies coined the term "Production Designer" in the 1930s.

Apocalypse Now was also notable for being the second film released in a Dolby sound system that has come to be known as 5.1, with three screen speaker channels, low-frequency enhancement, and two surround channels (one more channel than standard surround sound arrangements at the time). The movie was initially seen and heard in this 70mm six-track format in only 17 theaters, some of which also featured prototypes of the Model 650 subwoofer developed by John and Helen Meyer. In recent years, Murch has asserted that the Meyer Sound subwoofers were more "emotionally significant" to the film's presentations than were the two surround channels.

In 1996, Murch worked on Anthony Minghella's The English Patient, which was based on Michael Ondaatje's novel of the same name. Murch won Oscars both for his sound mixing and for his editing. Murch's editing Oscar was the first to be awarded for an electronically edited film (using the Avid system), and he is the only person ever to win Oscars for both sound mixing and film editing.

In 2003, Murch edited another Anthony Minghella film, Cold Mountain on Apple's sub-$1000 Final Cut Pro software using off the shelf Power Mac G4 computers. This was a leap for such a big-budget film, where expensive Avid systems were usually the standard non-linear editing system. He received an Academy Award nomination for this work; his efforts on the film were documented in Charles Koppelman's 2004 book Behind the Seen.

In 2006, he was awarded an honorary doctorate of letters by the Emily Carr Institute of Art and Design in Vancouver, Canada.

In 2009, Murch's work was the subject of a tribute, "The Art of Walter Murch", a program in "The Professionals", a series by the California Film Institute at the Christopher B. Smith Rafael Film Center.

In 2012, Murch was invited to serve as a mentor for the Rolex Mentor and Protégé Arts Initiative, an international philanthropic program that pairs masters in their disciplines with emerging talents for a year of one-to-one creative exchange. Murch chose Italian film editor Sara Fgaier as his protégée. Previous film mentors for the initiative include Mira Nair (2004), Stephen Frears (2006), Martin Scorsese (2008) and Zhang Yimou (2010).

Murch is the 2012 recipient of the Nikola Tesla Award given by the International Press Academy Satellite Awards for "Visionary Achievement in Filmmaking Technology". Previous recipients have included Douglas Trumbull, James Cameron, Roger Deakins, Dennis Muren and George Lucas.

In 2015, Murch was presented with the Vision Award Nescens, at the 68th Locarno Film Festival, for his contributions to cinema. The two previous recipients of the award, initiated in 2013, were Douglas Trumbull and Garrett Brown.

In 2016, he was awarded an honorary doctorate of media by the Southampton Solent University in Southampton, England along with Anne Coates who received an honorary Doctorate of Arts.

Murch has a long term association with the University of Hertfordshire; initially contributing an oral history interview with The Elstree Project in 2013. There is a dedicated post-production lab on the Hertfordshire campus named for Murch which opened in 2015. In 2018, Murch was awarded an honorary doctorate of arts by the University, for his contribution to the film industry in the county of Hertfordshire, his contribution towards The Elstree Project, and the Film and Television Production degrees. Murch and Hertfordshire's Head of Post-Production lecturer Howard Berry teamed up to create the documentary Her Name Was Moviola, which received its premiere in 2024. Students from Berry's film degree worked on the film as crew.

In 2024 he was awarded the ACE Career Achievement Award at the 74th American Cinema Editors Eddie Awards in March. In May of that same year, he was awarded an honorary doctorate by Ravensbourne University London for his outstanding contribution to cinema and his seminal writings on the craft of film editing.

In August 2025, Murch was awarded an Honorary Degree by the AFI.

Murch is also Honorary Associate of London Film School.

He is the only film editor to have received Academy Award nominations for films edited on four different systems:

- Julia (1977) using upright Moviola
- Apocalypse Now (1979), Ghost (1990), and The Godfather Part III (1990) using KEM flatbed
- The English Patient (1996) using Avid
- Cold Mountain (2003) using Final Cut Pro 4

== Personal life ==
Murch married Muriel Ann "Aggie" Slater at Riverside Church, New York City on August 6, 1965. Directly after marrying, the couple took a 6,000 mile motorcycle trip zig-zagging across the United States and Canada. They have four children and have lived in Bolinas, California since 1972.

== Filmography ==
=== Feature films ===
Year	Title	Editor	Sound	Writer	Director	Notes
1969	The Rain People	No	Yes	No	No	Sound Montage and Re-recording.
1971	THX-1138	No	Yes	Yes	No	Co-wrote the screenplay with George Lucas. Also credited with Sound Montage and Re-recording.
1972	The Godfather	No	Yes	No	No	Post-production consultant. Murch was the sound effects supervisor on "The Godfather", but he was not in the LA union at the time, so his credit on the film does not reflect his actual job.
1973	American Graffiti	No	Yes	No	No	Sound Montage and Re-recording.
1974	The Conversation	Yes	Yes	No	No	Nominated – Academy Award for Best Sound with Art Rochester. Sound Montage and Re-recording.
1974	The Godfather Part II	No	Yes	No	No	Sound Montage and Re-recording.
1977	Julia	Yes	No	No	No	Nominated — Academy Award for Best Film Editing. Co-edited with Marcel Durham
1979	Apocalypse Now	Yes	Yes	No	No	Academy Award for Best Sound with Mark Berger, Richard Beggs, and Nat Boxer. Nominated — Academy Award for Best Film Editing with Gerald B. Greenberg, Lisa Fruchtman and Richard Marks
1985	Return to Oz	No	No	Yes	Yes	Co-wrote with Gill Dennis
1988	The Unbearable Lightness of Being	Yes	No	No	No	
1990	Ghost	Yes	Yes	No	No	Nominated — Academy Award for Best Film Editing
1990	The Godfather Part III	Yes	Yes	No	No	Nominated — Academy Award for Best Film Editing with Barry Malkin and Lisa Fruchtman
1993	House of Cards	Yes	No	No	No	
1993	Romeo Is Bleeding	Yes	Yes	No	No	
1994	I Love Trouble	Yes	No	No	No	
1995	First Knight	Yes	Yes	No	No	
1996	The English Patient	Yes	Yes	No	No	Academy Award for Best Film Editing; Academy Award for Best Sound Mixing with Mark Berger, David Parker, and Christopher Newman
1999	The Talented Mr. Ripley	Yes	Yes	No	No	
2002	K-19: The Widowmaker	Yes	Yes	No	No	
2003	Cold Mountain	Yes	Yes	No	No	Nominated — Academy Award for Best Film Editing
2005	Jarhead	Yes	Yes	No	No	
2007	Youth Without Youth	Yes	Yes	No	No	
2009	Tetro	Yes	Yes	No	No	
2010	The Wolfman	Yes	No	No	No	Co-edited with Dennis Virkler and Mark Goldblatt
2013	Particle Fever	Yes	Yes	No	No	Feature documentary on the search for the Higgs Boson
2015	Tomorrowland	Yes	No	No	No	Co-edited with Craig Wood
2019	Coup 53	Yes	No	Yes	No	Murch is credited as editor and co-author of this feature-length documentary on Iran.
2024	Her Name Was Moviola	No	No	Yes	No	Murch also stars in this documentary about Moviola film editing.

=== Restorations and Re-edits ===
Year	Title	Editor	Sound	Writer	Director	Notes
1998	Touch of Evil	Yes	Yes	No	No	Originally released in 1958. Murch's restoration and re-edit was completed in 1998 for the film's forty-year anniversary re-release.
2000	The Dickson Experimental Sound Film	Yes	Yes	No	No	Originally released in 1894, Murch's restoration was completed in 2000. One of several attempts to marry the archival film's sound and picture. It was later shown to be incomplete and has since been re-synchronized by professional motion picture archivists.
2001	Apocalypse Now Redux	Yes	Yes	No	No	A re-edited version of Coppola's 1979 film with 49 minutes of deleted sequences added back into the film.

=== Television ===
Year	Title	Director	Editor	Notes
2011	Star Wars: The Clone Wars	Yes	No	Episode "The General" of Lucasfilm animated series
2012	Hemingway & Gellhorn	No	Yes	HBO Television movie, Phil Kaufman, director
