= Making Waves: The Art of Cinematic Sound =

2019 documentary film

- Directed by: Midge Costin
- Written by: Bobette Buster
- Produced by: Bobette Buster; Karen Johnson; Midge Costin
- Cinematography: Sandra Chandler
- Edited by: David J. Turner
- Music by: Allyson Newman
- Production companies: Ain't Heard Nothin' Yet; GoodMovies Entertainment; Busterfilms
- Release dates: April 29, 2019 (Tribeca); October 25, 2019
- Running time: 94 minutes
- Country: United States
- Language: English

Making Waves: The Art of Cinematic Sound is a 2019 documentary film about the history of sound design in cinema of the United States. It is directed by Midge Costin.

== Interviewees ==
- Walter Murch
- Ben Burtt
- Gary Rydstrom
- George Lucas
- Steven Spielberg
- Robert Redford
- Barbra Streisand
- Ryan Coogler
- Christopher Nolan
- Hans Zimmer
- David Lynch
- Ang Lee
- Sofia Coppola
- Peter Weir

== Critical reception ==
The review aggregator website Rotten Tomatoes wrote of the critics' consensus, "Making Waves: The Art of Cinematic Sound pays an all-too-rare tribute to an aspect of filmmaking that's utterly fascinating but often overlooked." The website assigned the film an approval rating of 97%, based on 66 reviews assessed as positive or negative; the average rating among the reviews is 7.5/10. The similar website Metacritic surveyed 12 critics and assessed 11 reviews as positive and 1 as mixed. It gave a weighted average score of 80 out of 100, which it said indicated "generally favorable reviews".
