= American Cinema Editors Award for Best Edited Drama Series =

Annual US television award

- Awarded for: Best Editing in a Drama Series
- Country: United States
- Presented by: American Cinema Editors (ACE)
- Currently held by: Timothy A. Good – The Last of Us (2023)
- Website: americancinemaeditors.org

The American Cinema Editors Award for Best Edited Drama Series for Commercial Television is one of the annual awards given by the American Cinema Editors. It has evolved throughout the history of the American Cinema Editors Awards, narrowing it's eligibility field numerous times.

- From 1962 to 1972, the award did make any distinctions between continual series and/or miniseries or television movies, or the genres of comedy and drama.
- In 1973, the award became Best Edited Episode from a Television Series, which it would remain from 20 years.
- In 1993, the award started separating series based on their running time, becoming Best Edited One-Hour Series for Television.
- In 2006, a distinction was made between commercial and non-commercial series, resulting in another split.
- In 2018, the category dropped running time distinctions, becoming Best Edited Drama Series for Commercial Television and Best Edited Drama Series for Non-Commercial Television
- In 2021, the category was awarded as Best Edited Drama Series, dropping any distinction between drama series.

== Winners and nominees ==
- † – indicates the winner of a Primetime Emmy Award.
- ‡ – indicates a nomination for a Primetime Emmy Award.

=== 1960s ===
Best Edited Television Program

Year	Program	Episode(s)	Nominees	Network
1961
1961	The Dick Powell Show	"Ricochet"	Desmond Marquette	NBC
1961	Bus Stop	"A Lion Walks Among Us"	Richard L. Van Enger	ABC
1961	The Gertrude Berg Show	"Lonely Sunday"	Chandler House	CBS
1961	Thriller	"A Third for Pinochle"	Danny B. Landres	NBC
1961	The Twilight Zone	"Once Upon a Time"	Jason H. Bernie	CBS
1962
1962	The Dick Powell Show	"The Court Martial of Captain Wycliff"	Desmond Marquette	NBC
1962	Combat!	"Escape to Nowhere"	William Mace	ABC
1962	The Eleventh Hour	"Of Roses and Nightingales and Other Lovely Things"	Joseph Dervin	NBC
1962	It's a Man's World	"The Beavers and the Otters"	Danford B. Greene	NBC
1962	McHale's Navy	"A Purple Heart for Gruber"	Sam E. Waxman	ABC
1963
1963	Dr. Kildare	"Four Feet in the Morning (Part 1)"	Harry V. Knapp	NBC
1963	The Eleventh Hour	"Four Feet in the Morning (Part 2)"	Joseph Dervin	NBC
1963	Bonanza	"Hoss and the Leprechauns"	Marvin Coil	NBC
1963	Breaking Point	"And James Was a Very Small Snail"	William Mace	ABC
1963	The Richard Boone Show	"The Wall to Wall War"	Jason H. Bernie	NBC
1964
1964	Rawhide	"No Dogs or Drovers"	Gene Fowler Jr.	CBS
1964	Bewitched	"I, Darrin, Take This Witch, Samantha"	Michael Luciano and Gerard Wilson	ABC
1964	The Man from U.N.C.L.E.	"The Deadly Games Affair"	Joseph Dervin	NBC
1964	Slattery's People	"Do the Ignorant Sleep in Pure White Beds?"	Daniel A. Nathan	CBS
1964	Wagon Train	"Little Girl Lost"	Gene Palmer	NBC
1965
1965	The Big Valley	"40 Rifles"	Sherman A. Rose	ABC
1965	A Slice of Sunday		Harry Coswick	KNXT
1965	I Spy	"The Loser"	Bud Molin	NBC
1965	Rawhide	"Encounter at Boot Hill"	Gene Fowler Jr.	CBS
1965	Wagon Train	"Silver Lady"	Gene Palmer	NBC
1966
1966	Twelve O'Clock High	"The All American"	Jodie Copelan	ABC
1966	The Big Valley	"Day of Terror"	Desmond Marquette	ABC
1966	Fame Is the Name of the Game		Joseph Dervin	NBC
1966	The F.B.I.	"The Camel's Nose"	Thomas Neff	ABC
1966	I Spy	"Court of the Lion"	Bud Molin	NBC
1967
1967	The Big Valley	"Disappearance"	Desmond Marquette	ABC
1967	Bewitched	"A Most Unusual Wood Nymph"	Aaron Nibley	ABC
1967	Daniel Boone	"Tanner"	Harry Coswick	NBC
1967	The Fugitive	"The Judgment: Part 2"	Jodie Copelan	ABC
1967	Gunsmoke	"A Hat"	Gerard Wilson	CBS
1967	The High Chaparral	"The Widow From Red Rock"	Harry Gerstad	NBC
1967	Ironside	"A Very, Cool, Hot Car"	Edward W. Williams	NBC
1968
1968	The Outcasts	"Take Your Lover In The Ring"	Norman Colbert	ABC
1968	The Bob Hope Christmas Special		Richard K. Brockway, Donn Cambern, John Fuller, Igo Kantor	NBC
1968	The High Chaparral	"Follow Your Heart"	George A. Gittens	NBC
1968	Ironside	"Split Second to an Epitaph"	Edward W. Williams	NBC
1968	Julia	"Mama's Man"	John Ehrin	NBC
1969
1969	Marcus Welby, M.D.	"A Matter of Humanities"	Gene Palmer	ABC
1969	The Bob Hope Christmas Special: Around the World with the USO		John C. Fuller, Igo Kantor, Patrick Kennedy, Frank McKelvey	NBC
1969	Bonanza	"Dead Wrong"	Danny B. Landres	NBC
1969	The Ghost & Mrs. Muir	"The Great Power Failure"	Axel Hubert Sr.	ABC
1969	Hollywood: The Selznick Years		David Blewitt and Graham Lee Mahin	NBC
1969	The Mystery of Animal Behavior		Peter C. Johnson	CBS
1969	My World and Welcome to It	"Rally Round the Flag"	Hugh Chaloupka	NBC
1969	Room 222	"Richie's Story"	Frank P. Keller	ABC

=== 1970s ===
Year	Program	Episode(s)	Nominees	Network
1970
1970	Medical Center	"Death Grip"	Richard Cahoon	CBS
1970	Gunsmoke	"Snow Train: Part 1"	Thomas J. McCarthy	CBS
1970	Storefront Lawyers	"A Man's Castle"	Ira Heymann	CBS
1970	The Tragedy of the Red Salmon		David Blewitt	
1970	The Young Lawyers	"The Glass Prison"	Joseph Dervin	ABC
1971
1971	Medical Center	"The Imposter"	Richard Cahoon	CBS
1971	Brian's Song		Bud S. Isaacs	ABC
1971	Ironside	"The Priest Killer"	Robert L. Kimble	NBC
1971	Longstreet	"Spell Legacy Like Death"	David Blewitt	ABC
1971	The Waltons	"The Homecoming: A Christmas Story"	Gene Fowler Jr. & Marjorie Fowler	CBS

Best Edited Episode from a Television Series

Year	Program	Episode(s)	Nominees	Network
1972
1972	M*A*S*H	"Bananas, Crackers and Nuts"	Fred W. Berger	CBS
1972	Anna and the King	"Pilot"	Richard L. Van Enger	CBS
1972	M*A*S*H	"Pilot"	Stanford Tischler	CBS
1973
1973	M*A*S*H	"The Trial of Henry Blake"	Fred W. Berger and Stanford Tischler	CBS
1973	Hawaii Five-O	"One Big Happy Family"	Jack Gleason	CBS
1973	Kung Fu	"The Chalice"	Joseph Dervin	ABC
1973	The Waltons	"The Thanksgiving Story"	Alan Jaggs, Bill Lewis and Gene Fowler Jr.	CBS
1974
1974	M*A*S*H	"A Full Rich Day"	Fred W. Berger and Stanford Tischler	CBS
1974	Kojak	"The Best Judge Money Can Buy"	Bill Brame	CBS
1974	The New Land	"The World Is: Persistence"	Jodie Copelan	ABC
1975
1975	The Wonderful World of Disney	"The Sky's the Limit: Parts 1 & 2"	Bob Bring	NBC
1975	Hawaii Five-O	"Turkey Shoot"	Jack Gleason	CBS
1975	M*A*S*H	"Welcome to Korea"	Fred W. Berger and Stanford Tischler	CBS
1975	The Streets of San Francisco	"Web of Lies"	Howard Kunin	ABC
1976
1976	The Streets of San Francisco	"Dead or Alive"	Howard Kunin	ABC
1976	M*A*S*H	"Dear Sigmund"	Samuel E. Beetley and Stanford Tischler	CBS
1976	Police Story	"Monster Manor"	Richard L. Van Enger	NBC
1977
1977	M*A*S*H	"Fade Out, Fade In"	Larry L. Mills and Stanford Tischler	CBS
1977	Charlie's Angels	"Pretty Angels All in a Row"	Joseph Dervin	ABC
1977	Police Story	"Pressure Point"	Richard L. Van Enger and David Wages	NBC
1977	Rich Man, Poor Man Book II	"Episode 15"	Jerrold L. Ludwig	ABC
1978
1978	Lou Grant	"Hooker" ‡	James Galloway	CBS
1978	Kaz	"Kaz"	David Blangsted and Howard Terrill	CBS
1978	M*A*S*H	"The Billfold Syndrome" ‡	Larry L. Mills and Stanford Tischler	CBS
1979
1979	M*A*S*H	"The Yalu Brick Road" ‡	Larry L. Mills and Stanford Tischler	CBS
1979	Hart to Hart	"Max in Love"	Bob Bring	ABC
1979	The Rockford Files	"No Fault Affair"	Rod Stephens	NBC

=== 1980s ===
Year	Program	Episode(s)	Nominees	Network
1980
1980	Dallas	"A House Divided"	Fred W. Berger	CBS
1980	Lou Grant	"Brushfire"	James Galloway	CBS
1980	M*A*S*H	"Dreams"	Larry L. Mills and Stanford Tischler	CBS
1981
1981	Magnum, P.I.	"Memories Are Forever"	Michael Berman and Ed Guidotti	CBS
1981	Dallas	"The Split" ‡	Fred W. Berger	CBS
1981	Lou Grant	"Strike" ‡	James Galloway	CBS
1982
1982	Fame	"Passing Grade" ‡	Michael A. Hoey	NBC
1982	Hill Street Blues	"Phantom of the Hill" †	Ray Daniels	NBC
1982	Hill Street Blues	"The World According to Freedom"	David Rosenbloom	NBC
1982	Lou Grant	"Recovery"	James Galloway	CBS
1983
1983	Hill Street Blues	"Here's Adventure, Here's Romance"	David Saxon	NBC
1983	Cagney & Lacey	"Burn Out"	Geoffrey Rowland	CBS
1983	Wild Kingdom	"New Zealand Deer Lift"	Bernard Braham	Syndication
1984
1984	Cagney & Lacey	"Heart"	Geoffrey Rowland	CBS
1984	Cheers	"Fairy Tales Can Come True"	Douglas Hines	NBC
1984	Hill Street Blues	"Blues for Mr. Green"	David Saxon	NBC
1985
1985	St. Elsewhere	"Haunted"	Robert P. Seppey	NBC
1985	Cagney & Lacey	"Rules of the Game"	Geoffrey Rowland	CBS
1985	Cheers	"The Executive's Executioner"	Douglas Hines	NBC
1985	Miami Vice	"Smuggler's Blues" ‡	Michael B. Hoggan	NBC
1986
1986	Hill Street Blues	"Two Easy Pieces"	Geoffrey Rowland	NBC
1986	Cheers	"The Peterson Principle"	Douglas Hines	NBC
1986	St. Elsewhere	"Afterlife" ‡	John Heath	NBC
1987
1987	St. Elsewhere	"The Idiot and the Odyssey"	Robert P. Seppey	NBC
1987	Cagney & Lacey	"Turn, Turn, Turn: Part 2"	Christopher Cooke	CBS
1987	Tour of Duty	"Pilot"	John Duffy and Douglas Ibold	CBS
1988
1988	Thirtysomething	"Accounts Receivable"	Victor Du Bois and David Rosenbloom	ABC
1988	Hooperman	"Nick Derringer, P.I."	Noelle Imparato	ABC
1988	In the Heat of the Night	"The Hammer and the Glove"	Buford F. Hayes	NBC
1989
1989	In the Heat of the Night	"These Things Take Time"	Buford F. Hayes and Victor B. Lackey	NBC
1989	L.A. Law	"His Suit is Hirsute" ‡	Paul Dixon	NBC
1989	Murder, She Wrote	"Night of the Tarantula"	John C. Horger	CBS

=== 1990s ===
Year	Program	Episode(s)	Nominees	Network
1990
1990	DEA	"DEA" ‡	Fred W. Berger	Fox
1990	L.A. Law	"God Rest Ye Murray Gentleman" ‡	Paul Dixon and Mervin B. Dayan	NBC
1990	The Wonder Years	"Good-bye" ‡	Dennis C. Vejar	ABC
1991
1991	Brooklyn Bridge	"War of the Worlds" ‡	Roger Bondelli, Jerry U. Frizell and Ron Volk	CBS
1991	Homefront	"S.N.A.F.U." ‡	Michael B. Hoggan and William B. Stich	ABC
1991	I'll Fly Away	"Pilot" ‡	David Rosenbloom and Karen I. Stern	NBC

Best Edited One-Hour Series for Television

Year	Program	Episode(s)	Nominees	Network
1992
1992	Quantum Leap	"A Song for the Soul"	Jon Koslowsky	NBC
1992	L.A. Law	"Say Goodnight Gracie"	Randy Roberts and Wendy J. Plump	NBC
1992	Northern Exposure	"Cicely" ‡	Briana London	CBS
1992	Sisters	"Portrait of the Artists"	Philip Carr Neel	NBC
1993
1993	Northern Exposure	"Kaddish for Uncle Manny"	Briana London and Sharon Silverman	CBS
1993	Lois & Clark: The New Adventures of Superman	"The Green, Green Glow of Home"	M. Edward Salier	ABC
1993	NYPD Blue	"Pilot" ‡	Lawrence Jordan	ABC
1994
1994	Chicago Hope ‡	"Pilot"	Lori Jane Coleman	CBS
1994	My So-Called Life	"Why Jordan Can't Read"	Robert Frazen	ABC
1994	Northern Exposure	"Lovers and Madmen"	Briana London	CBS
1995
1995	ER	"Love's Labor Lost" †	Randy Jon Morgan and Rick Tuber	NBC
1995	Chicago Hope	"Love and Hope"	Alec Smight	CBS
1995	Chicago Hope	"Quarantine" ‡	Randy Roberts	CBS
1995	Homicide: Life on the Street	"The Gas Man"	Cindy Mollo	NBC
1996
1996	Chicago Hope	"Transplanted Affection"	Randy Roberts	CBS
1996	ER	"The Healers" ‡	Randy Jon Morgan	NBC
1996	The X-Files	"Unruhe"	Heather MacDougall	Fox
1997
1997	ER	"The Long Way Around" †	Randy Jon Morgan	NBC
1997	Early Edition	"The Wall (Part 2)"	Randy Roberts and Warren Bowman	CBS
1997	The X-Files	"The Post-Modern Prometheus" ‡	Lynne Willingham	Fox
1998
1998	NYPD Blue	"Hearts and Souls"	Jane Kass	ABC
1998	Chicago Hope	"Gun with the Wind"	Alec Smight	CBS
1998	Felicity	"Pilot"	Stan Salfas and Warren Bowman	The WB
1999
1999	Ally McBeal	"Car Wash"	Philip Carr Neel	Fox
1999	The Sopranos	"I Dream of Jeannie Cusamano"	William B. Stich	HBO
1999	The West Wing	"Pilot"	Christopher Nelson	NBC

=== 2000s ===
Year	Program	Episode(s)	Nominees	Network
2000
2000	The West Wing	"What Kind of Day Has It Been" ‡	Tina Hirsch	NBC
2000	CSI: Crime Scene Investigation	"Pilot" ‡	Alex Mackie and Alec Smight	CBS
2000	The Sopranos	"Funhouse" ‡	Sidney Wolinsky	HBO
2001
2001	The Sopranos	"Pine Barrens" ‡	Conrad M. Gonzalez	HBO
2001	24	"4:00 a.m. – 5:00 a.m."	Chris G. Willingham	Fox
2001	Alias	"Truth Be Told"	Stan Salfas and Quincy Z. Gunderson	ABC
2002
2002	The Sopranos	"Whitecaps"	Sidney Wolinsky	HBO
2002	24	"Day 2: 2:00 p.m.-3:00 p.m."	Chris G. Willingham	Fox
2002	The West Wing	"Election Night"	Janet Ashikaga	NBC
2003
2003	24	"Day 2: 10:00 p.m. – 11:00 p.m."	Scott Powell	Fox
2003	Law & Order: Special Victims Unit	"Loss"	Douglas Ibold and Bonnie Koehler	NBC
2003	The West Wing	"Twenty Five" ‡	Janet Ashikaga	NBC
2004
2004	Boston Legal	"Hired Guns"	Philip Carr Neel	ABC
2004	Desperate Housewives	"Pilot" †	Michael Berenbaum	ABC
2004	The Sopranos	"Long Term Parking" ‡	William B. Stich	HBO

Best Edited One-Hour Series for Commercial and Non-Commercial Television

Year	Program	Episode(s)	Nominees	Network
2005	Best Edited One-Hour Series for Commercial Television			
2005	Lost	"Outlaws"	Stephen Semel	ABC
2005	24	"Day 4: 10:00 a.m.-11:00 a.m."	Chris G. Willingham	Fox
2005	Boston Legal	"The Ass Fat Jungle"	Philip Carr Neel	ABC
2005	Prison Break	"Pilot"	Mark Helfrich	Fox
2005	Best Edited One-Hour Series for Non-Commercial Television			
2005	Deadwood	"A Lie Agreed Upon (Part I)" ‡	Stephen Mark	HBO
2005	Carnivàle	"Creed, OK"	David Siegel	HBO
2005	Six Feet Under	"Everyone's Waiting"	Michael Ruscio	HBO
2006	Best Edited One-Hour Series for Commercial Television			
2006	Friday Night Lights	"Pilot"	Conrad M. Gonzalez, Keith Henderson and Stephen Michael	NBC
2006	24	"Day 5: 7:00 a.m. – 8:00 a.m." †	David Latham	Fox
2006	Grey's Anatomy	"It's the End of the World"	Edward Ornelas	ABC
2006	Best Edited One-Hour Series for Non-Commercial Television			
2006	The Wire	"Boys of Summer"	Kate Sanford	HBO
2006	Deadwood	"Tell Your God to Ready for Blood"	Stephen Mark	HBO
2006	The Sopranos	"Members Only"	Sidney Wolinsky	HBO
2007	Best Edited One-Hour Series for Commercial Television			
2007	Chuck	"Chuck Versus the Intersect"	Norman Buckley	NBC
2007	Damages	"Get Me a Lawyer"	Malcolm Jamieson	FX
2007	Law & Order: Special Victims Unit	"Paternity"	Karen I. Stern	NBC
2007	Best Edited One-Hour Series for Non-Commercial Television			
2007	The Sopranos	"Made in America"	Sidney Wolinsky	HBO
2007	Dexter	"It's Alive!"	Stewart Schill	Showtime
2007	Rome	"De Patre Vostro (About Your Father)"	David Siegel	HBO
2008
2008	Best Edited One-Hour Series for Commercial Television			
2008	Breaking Bad	"Pilot" †	Lynne Willingham	AMC
2008	Boston Legal	"True Love"	Craig Bench	ABC
2008	Law & Order: Special Victims Unit	"Authority"	Karen I. Stern	NBC
2008	Best Edited One-Hour Series for Non-Commercial Television			
2008	True Blood	"Strange Love"	Michael Ruscio and Andy Keir	HBO
2008	Crash	"Los Muertos"	Eric A. Sears	Starz
2008	The Wire	"More with Less"	Kate Sanford	HBO
2009	Best Edited One-Hour Series for Commercial Television			
2009	Breaking Bad	"ABQ" †	Lynne Willingham	AMC
2009	24	"Day 7: 8:00 a.m.-9:00 a.m."	David Latham	Fox
2009	ER	"And in the End..."	Randy Jon Morgan andJacque Elaine Toberen	NBC
2009	Law & Order: Special Victims Unit	"Hardwired"	Karen I. Stern	NBC
2009	Lost	"The Life and Death of Jeremy Bentham"	Christopher Nelson	ABC
2009	Best Edited One-Hour Series for Non-Commercial Television			
2009	Dexter	"Remains to Be Seen"	Louis Cioffi	Showtime
2009	True Blood	"Hard-Hearted Hannah"	Louise Innes	HBO
2009	Dexter	"Living the Dream"	Stewart Schill	Showtime

=== 2010s ===
Year	Program	Episode(s)	Nominees	Network
2010	Best Edited One-Hour Series for Commercial Television			
2010	The Walking Dead	"Days Gone By"	Hunter M. Via	AMC
2010	Breaking Bad	"Sunset"	Kelley Dixon	AMC
2010	Friday Night Lights	"I Can't"	Mark Conte	The 101 Network
2010	Glee	"Journey to Regionals"	Bradley Buecker, Doc Crotzer, Joe Leonard and John Roberts	Fox
2010	The Good Wife	"Running"	Scott Vickrey	CBS
2010	Best Edited One-Hour Series for Non-Commercial Television			
2010	Treme	"Do You Know What It Means"	Alex Hall and Kate Sanford	HBO
2010	Boardwalk Empire	"Boardwalk Empire" †	Sidney Wolinsky	HBO
2010	Dexter	"Take It!" ‡	Louis Cioffi	Showtime
2011	Best Edited One-Hour Series for Commercial Television			
2011	Breaking Bad	"Face Off" ‡	Skip Macdonald	AMC
2011	Friday Night Lights	"Always"	Angela M. Catanzaro	The 101 Network
2011	Breaking Bad	"End Times" ‡	Kelley Dixon	AMC
2011	The Good Wife	"Real Deal"	Hibah Schweitzer	CBS
2011	The Walking Dead	"Save the Last One"	Hunter M. Via	AMC
2011	Best Edited One-Hour Series for Non-Commercial Television			
2011	Homeland	"Pilot" †	Jordan Goldman & David Latham	Showtime
2011	Boardwalk Empire	"To the Lost"	Sidney Wolinsky	HBO
2011	Game of Thrones	"Baelor"	Frances Parker	HBO
2012	Best Edited One-Hour Series for Commercial Television			
2012	Breaking Bad	"Dead Freight" ‡	Skip Macdonald	AMC
2012	Nashville	"Pilot"	Keith Henderson	ABC
2012	Breaking Bad	"Gliding Over All" †	Kelley Dixon	AMC
2012	Mad Men	"The Other Woman"	Tom Wilson	AMC
2012	Smash	"Pilot"	Andrew Weisblum	NBC
2012	Best Edited One-Hour Series for Non-Commercial Television			
2012	The Newsroom	"We Just Decided To"	Anne McCabe	HBO
2012	Homeland	"The Choice"	Terry Kelley	Showtime
2012	Homeland	"State of Independence"	Jordan Goldman	Showtime
2013	Best Edited One-Hour Series for Commercial Television			
2013	Breaking Bad	"Felina" †	Skip Macdonald	AMC
2013	The Good Wife	"Hitting the Fan"	Scott Vickery	CBS
2013	Breaking Bad	"Buried"	Skip Macdonald and Sharidan Williams-Sotelo	AMC
2013	Breaking Bad	"Ozymandias"	Skip Macdonald	AMC
2013	Breaking Bad	"Granite State" ‡	Kelley Dixon and Chris McCaleb	AMC
2013	Best Edited One-Hour Series for Non-Commercial Television			
2013	Homeland	"Big Man in Tehran"	Terry Kelley	Showtime
2013	Game of Thrones	"The Rains of Castamere" ‡	Oral Norrie Ottey	HBO
2013	House of Cards	"Chapter 1" ‡	Kirk Baxter	Netflix
2014	Best Edited One-Hour Series for Commercial Television			
2014	Sherlock	"His Last Vow" †	Yan Miles	PBS
2014	24: Live Another Day	"Day 9: 10:00 p.m. – 11:00 a.m." ‡	Scott Powell	Fox
2014	The Good Wife	"A Few Words"	Scott Vickery	CBS
2014	Madam Secretary	"Pilot"	Elena Maganini and Michael D. Ornstein	CBS
2014	Mad Men	"Waterloo"	Christopher Gay	AMC
2014	Best Edited One-Hour Series for Non-Commercial Television			
2014	True Detective	"Who Goes There" ‡	Affonso Gonçalves	HBO
2014	House of Cards	"Chapter 14" ‡	Byron Smith	Netflix
2014	True Detective	"The Secret Fate of All Life"	Alex Hall	HBO
2015	Best Edited One-Hour Series for Commercial Television			
2015	Mad Men	"Person to Person" ‡	Tom Wilson	AMC
2015	Better Call Saul	"Uno"	Skip Macdonald	AMC
2015	Better Call Saul	"Five-O" ‡	Kelley Dixon	AMC
2015	Fargo	"Did You Do This? No, You Did It!" ‡	Skip Macdonald and Curtis Thurber	FX
2015	The Good Wife	"Restraint"	Scott Vickery	CBS
2015	Best Edited One-Hour Series for Non-Commercial Television			
2015	House of Cards	"Chapter 39"	Lisa Bromwell	Netflix
2015	Game of Thrones	"The Dance of Dragons" †	Katie Weiland	HBO
2015	Game of Thrones	"Hardhome" ‡	Tim Porter	HBO
2015	Homeland	"The Tradition of Hospitality"	Harvey Rosenstock	Showtime
2015	The Knick	"Wonderful Surprises"	Steven Soderbergh	Cinemax
2016	Best Edited One-Hour Series forCommercial Television			
2016	This Is Us	"Pilot"	David L. Bertman	NBC
2016	Better Call Saul	"Fifi"	Skip Macdonald	AMC
2016	Better Call Saul	"Nailed" ‡	Kelley Dixon and Chris McCaleb	AMC
2016	Better Call Saul	"Klick"	Skip Macdonald and Curtis Thurber	AMC
2016	Mr. Robot	"eps2.4_m4ster-s1ave.aes"	Philip Harrison	USA
2016	Best Edited One-Hour Series for Non-Commercial Television			
2016	Game of Thrones	"Battle of the Bastards" †	Tim Porter	HBO
2016	The Crown	"Assassins"	Yan Miles	Netflix
2016	Stranger Things	"Chapter One: The Vanishing of Will Byers" †	Dean Zimmerman	Netflix
2016	Stranger Things	"Chapter Seven: The Bathtub" ‡	Kevin D. Ross	Netflix
2016	Westworld	"The Original"	Stephen Semel and Marc Jozefowicz	HBO

Best Edited Drama Series for Commercial and Non-Commercial Television

Year	Program	Episode(s)	Nominees	Network
2017	Best Edited Drama Series for Commercial Television			
2017	Fargo	"Who Rules the Land of Denial?"	Andrew Seklir	FX
2017	Better Call Saul	"Witness" ‡	Kelley Dixon, Skip Macdonald	AMC
2017	Better Call Saul	"Chicanery" ‡	Skip Macdonald	AMC
2017	Fargo	"Aporia" ‡	Henk Van Eeghen	FX
2017	Best Edited Drama Series for Non-Commercial Television			
2017	The Handmaid's Tale	"Offred"	Julian Clarke & Wendy Hallam Martin	Hulu
2017	Big Little Lies	"You Get What You Need" ‡	Véronique Barbe, David Berman, Justin Lachance, Sylvain Lebel, Maxime Lahaie and Jean-Marc Vallée	HBO
2017	Game of Thrones	"Beyond the Wall" ‡	Tim Porter	HBO
2017	Stranger Things	"Chapter Nine: The Gate" ‡	Kevin D. Ross	Netflix
2018	Best Edited Drama Series for Commercial Television			
2018	Killing Eve	"Nice Face"	Gary Dollner	BBC America
2018	The Americans	"START"	Daniel A. Valverde	FX
2018	Better Call Saul	"Something Stupid"	Kelley Dixon, Skip Macdonald	AMC
2018	Better Call Saul	"Winner"	Chris McCaleb	AMC
2018	Best Edited Drama Series for Non-Commercial Television			
2018	Bodyguard	"Episode 1"	Steve Singleton	Netflix
2018	Homecoming	"Redwood"	Rosanne Tan	Amazon
2018	Ozark	"One Way Out"	Cindy Mollo and Heather Goodwin Floyd	Netflix
2018	Westworld	"The Passenger"	Andrew Seklir, Anna Hauger and Mako Kamitsuna	HBO
2019	Best Edited Drama Series for Commercial Television			
2019	Killing Eve	"Desperate Times"	Dan Crinnion	BBC America
2019	Chicago Med	"Never Going Back to Normal"	David Siegel	NBC
2019	Killing Eve	"Smell Ya Later"	Al Morrow	BBC America
2019	Mr. Robot	"401 Unauthorized"	Rosanne Tan	USA
2019	Best Edited Drama Series for Non-Commercial Television			
2019	Game of Thrones	"The Long Night" †	Tim Porter	HBO
2019	Euphoria	"Pilot"	Julio Perez IV	HBO
2019	Mindhunter	"Episode 2"	Kirk Baxter	Netflix
2019	Watchmen	"It's Summer and We're Running Out of Ice"	David Eisenberg	HBO

=== 2020s ===
Year	Program	Episode(s)	Nominees	Network
2020	Best Edited One-Hour Series for Commercial Television			
2020	Better Call Saul	"Bad Choice Road"	Joey Liew, Chris McCaleb	AMC
2020	Killing Eve	"Still Got It"	Dan Crinnion	BBC America
2020	Mr. Robot	"405 Method Not Allowed"	Rosanne Tan	USA
2020	This Is Us	"Forty: Part Two"	Julia Grove, Lai-San Ho	NBC
2020	Best Edited One-Hour Series for Non-Commercial Television			
2020	Ozark	"Wartime"‡	Cindy Mollo	Netflix
2020	Bosch	"The Ace Hotel"	Steven Cohen	Amazon
2020	Euphoria	"Trouble Don't Last Always"	Julio C. Perez IV	HBO
2020	The Mandalorian	"Chapter 4: Sanctuary"‡	Dana E. Glauberman	Disney+

Best Edited Drama Series

Year	Program	Episode(s)	Nominees	Network
2021	Succession	"All the Bells Say"	Ken Eluto	HBO
2021	Lupin	"Chapter 1"	Jean-Daniel Fernandez-Qundez	Netflix
2021	Squid Game	"Gganbu"	Nam Na-young	Netflix
2021	Euphoria	"Fuck Anyone Who's Not a Sea Blob"	Nikola Boyanov and Julio C. Pérez IV	HBO
2021	Succession	"Chiantishire"	Jane Rizzo	HBO
2022	Andor	"One Way Out"	Simon Smith	Disney+
2022	Euphoria	"Stand Still Like the Hummingbird"	Julio C. Pérez IV and Aaron I. Butler	HBO
2022	Euphoria	"The Theater and Its Double"	Julio C. Pérez IV, Laura Zempel, and Nikola Boyanov	HBO
2022	Severance	"In Perpetuity"	Geoffrey Richman and Erica Freed Marker	Apple TV+
2022	Severance	"The We We Are"	Geoffrey Richman	Apple TV+
2023	The Last of Us	"Long, Long Time"	Timothy A. Good	HBO
2023	Ahsoka	"Fallen Jedi"	Dana E. Glauberman	Disney+
2023	Slow Horses	"Strange Games"	Sam Williams	Apple TV+
2023	Succession	"Connor's Wedding"	Bill Henry	HBO
2023	Succession	"With Open Eyes"	Ken Eluto	HBO

== Programs with multiple awards ==
5 awards

- Breaking Bad (AMC)
- M*A*S*H (CBS)

2 awards

- The Big Valley (ABC)
- Chicago Hope (CBS)
- The Dick Powell Show (NBC)
- ER (NBC)
- Hill Street Blues (NBC)
- Killing Eve (BBC America)
- Medical Center (CBS)
- The Sopranos (HBO)
- St. Elsewhere (NBC)

== Programs with multiple nominations ==
11 nominations

- Breaking Bad (AMC)

10 nominations

- Better Call Saul (AMC)
- M*A*S*H (CBS)

7 nominations

- 24 (Fox)

5 nominations

- Chicago Hope (CBS)
- The Good Wife (CBS)
- Hill Street Blue (NBC)
- The Sopranos (HBO)

4 nominations

- Cagney & Lacey (CBS)
- ER (NBC)
- Killing Eve (BBC America)
- Law & Order: Special Victims Unit (NBC)
- Lou Grant (CBS)
- Succession (HBO)
- The West Wing (NBC)

3 nominations

- The Big Valley (ABC)
- Boston Legal (ABC)
- Cheers (NBC)
- Fargo (FX)
- Friday Night Lights (NBC/The 101 Network)
- Ironside (NBC)
- L.A. Law (NBC)
- Mad Men (AMC)
- Mr. Robot (USA)
- Northern Exposure (CBS)
- St. Elsewhere (NBC)

2 nominations

- Bewitched (ABC)
- Bonanza (NBC)
- Dallas (CBS)
- The Dick Powell Show (NBC)
- The Eleventh Hour (NBC)
- Gunsmoke (CBS)
- Hawaii Five-O (CBS)
- The High Chaparral (NBC)
- In the Heat of the Night (NBC)
- I Spy (NBC)
- Lost (ABC)
- Medical Center (CBS)
- NYPD Blue (ABC)
- Police Story (NBC)
- Rawhide (CBS)
- The Streets of San Francisco (ABC)
- Wagon Train (NBC)
- The Walking Dead (AMC)
- The Waltons (CBS)
- The X-Files (Fox)
- This Is Us (NBC)

== See also ==
- American Cinema Editors Award for Best Edited Half-Hour Series for Television (1992–2016)
- American Cinema Editors Award for Best Edited Comedy Series for Commercial Television (2017–2020)
- American Cinema Editors Award for Best Edited Comedy Series for Non-Commercial Television (2017–2020)
- American Cinema Editors Award for Best Edited Single-Camera Comedy Series (2021–present)
- American Cinema Editors Award for Best Edited Multi-Camera Comedy Series (2021–present)
