= William Lincoln =

William Lincoln may refer to:

- William S. Lincoln (1813–1893), U.S. Representative from New York
- William Wallace Lincoln (1850–1862), son of Abraham Lincoln
- J. William Lincoln (born 1940), Pennsylvania politician
- W. J. Lincoln (1870–1917), Australian dramatist and filmmaker
- William Lincoln, a perpetrator of the 2015 Hatton Garden safe deposit burglary
