= McNichols =

McNichols is a surname. Notable people with the surname include:

- Jeremy McNichols (born 1995), American football player
- John J. McNichols (1927–2020), American politician and lawyer
- John P. McNichols (1875–1932), American Jesuit priest
- Raymond Clyne McNichols (1914–1985), United States federal judge
- Robert James McNichols (1922–1993), United States federal judge
- Stephen McNichols (1914–1997), American politician, governor of Colorado
- Walter McNichols (1863–1924), American politician and businessman
- William Hart McNichols (born 1949), American Roman Catholic priest and artist
- William H. McNichols Jr. (1910–1997), American politician

== See also ==
- McNichols Sports Arena ("Big Mac"), indoor arena in Denver, Colorado, USA
