= List of awards and nominations received by Lou Grant =

List of awards won by Lou Grant
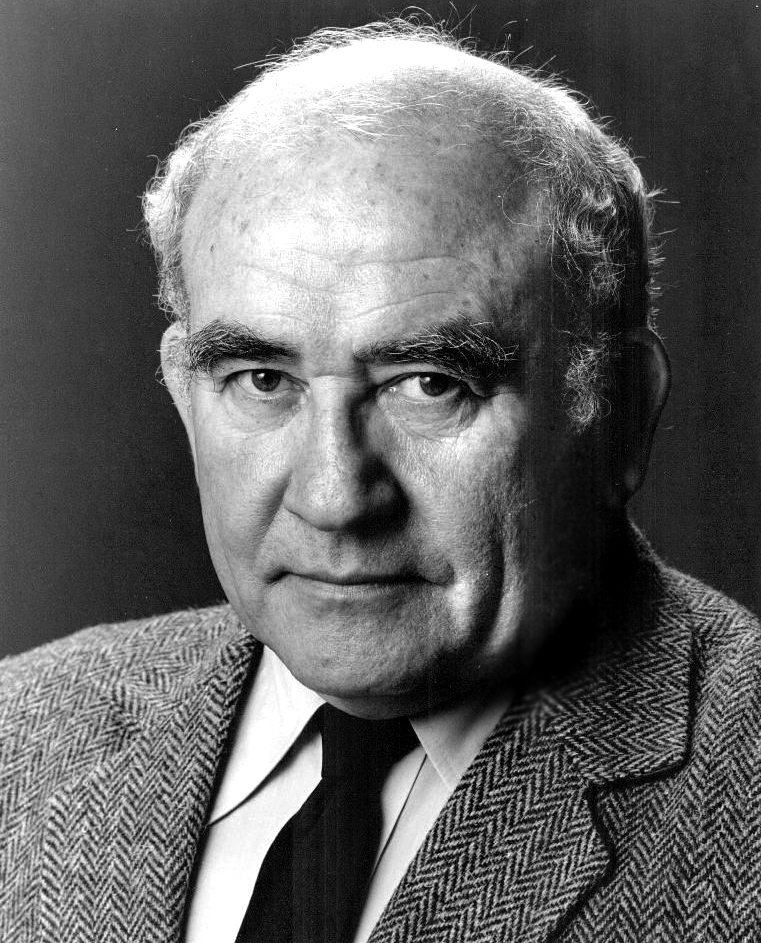
- Ed Asner received many awards and nominations for his performance as Lou Grant.
Awards and nominations
Award	Won	Nominated
ACE Eddie Awards	1	4
Broadcasting Press Guild Awards	1	1
Directors Guild of America Awards	3	5
Emmy Awards	13	56
Golden Globe Awards	3	12
Golden Reel Awards	1	1
Edgar Awards	0	1
Humanitas Prize	2	4
Peabody Awards	1	1
Writers Guild of America Award	2	14
- Total number of wins and nominations
Totals	27	99
- References

Lou Grant is an American television drama series created by James L. Brooks, Allan Burns and Gene Reynolds and produced by MTM Productions. The show originally aired in the United States on CBS between September 20, 1977, and September 12, 1982, with 114 episodes split over five seasons. A spin off of the 1970s comedy series The Mary Tyler Moore Show, the series follows Lou Grant, played by Ed Asner, as he moves to Los Angeles to work as city editor for the fictional Los Angeles Tribune.

Lou Grant garnered acclaim and amassed 99 nominations for various industry awards, winning 27 awards. This includes 56 Emmy Awards (with 13 wins), 12 Golden Globe Awards (with 3 wins), 5 Directors Guild of America Awards (with 3 wins), and 14 Writers Guild of America Awards (with 2 wins). Asner and Nancy Marchand won the most awards for their performances in the series, with Asner winning 2 Emmy Awards and 2 Golden Globe Awards while Marchand won 4 Emmy Awards for Outstanding Supporting Actress.

== Awards and nominations ==
=== ACE Eddie Awards ===
The Eddie Award is an annual accolade that was created by American Cinema Editors in 1962 to award outstanding achievements in editing in television and film. Lou Grant won an award from four nominations for Best Edited Episode from a Television Series.

Year	Category	Nominee(s)	Episode(s)	Result	Ref
1979	Best Edited Episode from a Television Series	James Galloway	for "Hooker"	Won	
1981	Best Edited Episode from a Television Series	James Galloway	for "Brushfire"	Nominated	
1982	Best Edited Episode from a Television Series	James Galloway	for "Strike"	Nominated	
1983	Best Edited Episode from a Television Series	James Galloway	for "Recovery"	Nominated	

=== Broadcasting Press Guild Awards ===
The Broadcasting Press Guild Awards is an annual accolade awarded by the Broadcasting Press Guild that recognizes "outstanding programmes and performances seen or heard in the preceding year." Lou Grant received the award for Best Imported Programme in 1979.

Year	Category	Nominee(s)	Result	Ref
1979	Best Imported Programme		Won	

=== Directors Guild of America Awards ===
The Directors Guild of America Award, presented by the Directors Guild of America, is an annual accolade that honors excellence among directors in film and television. Lou Grant received 5 nominations, winning three awards for Outstanding Directorial Achievement in Drama Series.

Year	Category	Nominee(s)	Episode(s)	Result	Ref
1978	Outstanding Directorial Achievement in Drama Series	Gene Reynolds	for "Prisoner"	Won	
1979	Outstanding Directorial Achievement in Drama Series	Gene Reynolds	for "Bomb"	Nominated	
1979	Outstanding Directorial Achievement in Drama Series	Roger Young	for "Cop"	Won	
1980	Outstanding Directorial Achievement in Drama Series	Gene Reynolds	for "Nightside"	Nominated	
1980	Outstanding Directorial Achievement in Drama Series	Roger Young	for "Lou"	Won	

=== Emmy Awards ===
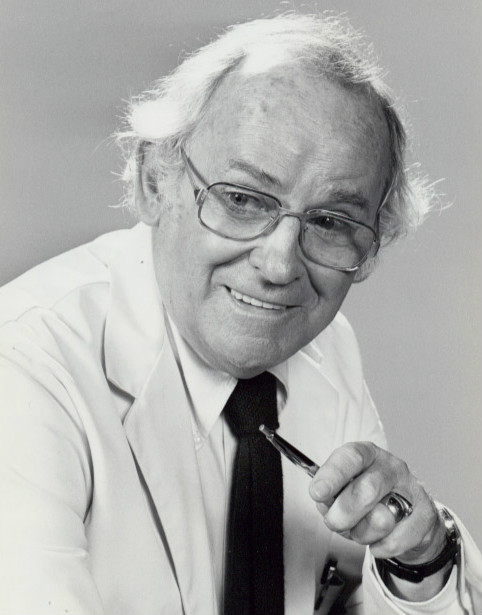
Barnard Hughes received an Emmy award for his guest starring role on the series.

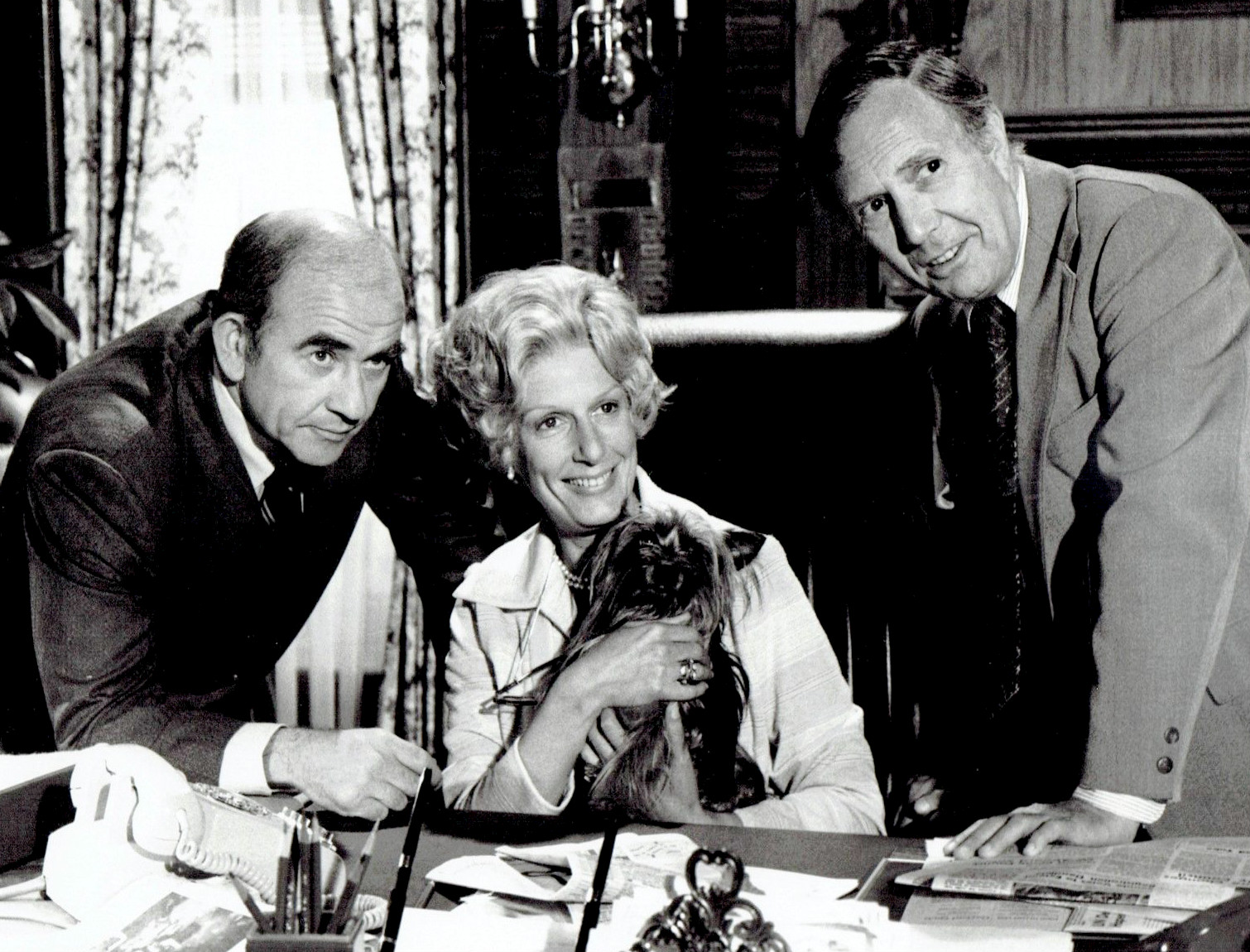
Nancy Marchand won four Emmy award for her performance as Margaret Pynchon.

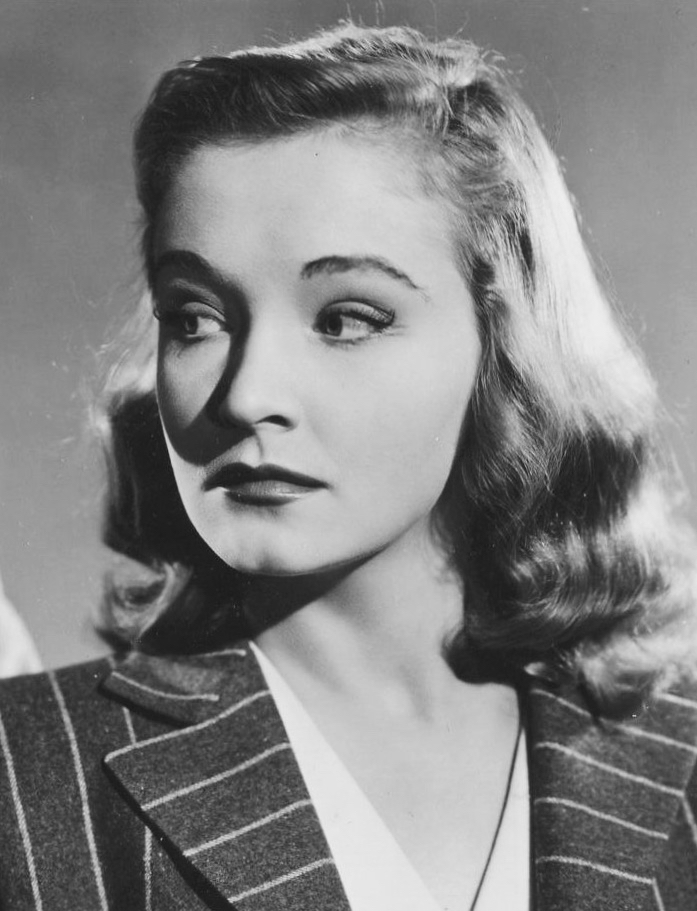
Nina Foch received an Emmy nomination for her performance as Mrs. Polk.

Presented by the Academy of Television Arts & Sciences since 1949, the Primetime Emmy Award is an annual accolade that honors outstanding achievements in various aspects of television such as acting, directing and writing. Lou Grant received 56 nominations, winning 13 awards, including four awards for Outstanding Continuing Performance by a Supporting Actress in a Drama Series (Nancy Marchand), two awards for Outstanding Drama Series, two awards for Outstanding Lead Actor in a Drama Series (Ed Asner), two awards for Outstanding Writing in a Drama Series, an award for Outstanding Lead Actor for a Single Appearance in a Drama or Comedy Series, an award for Outstanding Directing in a Drama Series (Roger Young), and an award for Outstanding Music Composition for a Series (Dramatic Underscore) (Patrick Williams).

==== Primetime Emmy Awards ====
Year	Category	Nominee(s)	Episode(s)	Result	Ref
1978	Outstanding Drama Series	James L. Brooks, Allan Burns and Gene Reynolds		Nominated	
1978	Outstanding Lead Actor in a Drama Series	Ed Asner as Lou Grant		Won	
1978	Outstanding Continuing Performance by a Supporting Actress in a Drama Series	Linda Kelsey as Billie Newman		Nominated	
1978	Outstanding Continuing Performance by a Supporting Actress in a Drama Series	Nancy Marchand as Margaret Pynchon		Won	
1978	Outstanding Lead Actor for a Single Appearance in a Drama or Comedy Series	Barnard Hughes as Judge Felix Rushman	for "Judge"	Won	
1979	Outstanding Drama Series	Seth Freeman, Gary David Goldberg and Gene Reynolds		Won	
1979	Outstanding Lead Actor in a Drama Series	Ed Asner as Lou Grant		Nominated	
1979	Outstanding Supporting Actor in a Drama Series	Mason Adams as Charles Hume		Nominated	
1979	Outstanding Supporting Actor in a Drama Series	Robert Walden as Joe Rossi		Nominated	
1979	Outstanding Continuing Performance by a Supporting Actress in a Drama Series	Linda Kelsey as Billie Newman		Nominated	
1979	Outstanding Continuing Performance by a Supporting Actress in a Drama Series	Nancy Marchand as Margaret Pynchon		Nominated	
1979	Outstanding Directing in a Drama Series	Burt Brinckerhoff	for "Schools"	Nominated	
1979	Outstanding Directing in a Drama Series	Mel Damski	for "Murder"	Nominated	
1979	Outstanding Directing in a Drama Series	Gene Reynolds	for "Prisoner"	Nominated	
1979	Outstanding Writing in a Drama Series	Michele Gallery	for "Dying"	Won	
1979	Outstanding Writing in a Drama Series	Gene Reynolds	for "Marathon"	Nominated	
1979	Outstanding Writing in a Drama Series	Leon Tokatyan	for "Vet"	Nominated	
1980	Outstanding Drama Series	Seth Freeman and Gene Reynolds		Won	
1980	Outstanding Lead Actor in a Drama Series	Ed Asner as Lou Grant		Won	
1980	Outstanding Supporting Actor in a Drama Series	Mason Adams as Charles Hume		Nominated	
1980	Outstanding Supporting Actor in a Drama Series	Robert Walden as Joe Rossi		Nominated	
1980	Outstanding Supporting Actress in a Drama Series	Nina Foch as Mrs. Polk	for "Hollywood"	Nominated	
1980	Outstanding Supporting Actress in a Drama Series	Linda Kelsey as Billie Newman		Nominated	
1980	Outstanding Supporting Actress in a Drama Series	Nancy Marchand as Margaret Pynchon		Won	
1980	Outstanding Directing in a Drama Series	Burt Brinckerhoff	for "Hollywood"	Nominated	
1980	Outstanding Directing in a Drama Series	Peter Levin	for "Andrew, Part II: Trial"	Nominated	
1980	Outstanding Directing in a Drama Series	Gene Reynolds	for "Influence"	Nominated	
1980	Outstanding Directing in a Drama Series	Roger Young	for "Cop"	Won	
1980	Outstanding Writing in a Drama Series	Allan Burns and Gene Reynolds	for "Brushfire"	Nominated	
1980	Outstanding Writing in a Drama Series	Seth Freeman	for "Cop"	Won	
1980	Outstanding Writing in a Drama Series	Michele Gallery	for "Lou"	Nominated	
1981	Outstanding Drama Series	Seth Freeman and Gene Reynolds		Nominated	
1981	Outstanding Lead Actor in a Drama Series	Ed Asner as Lou Grant		Nominated	
1981	Outstanding Supporting Actor in a Drama Series	Mason Adams as Charles Hume		Nominated	
1981	Outstanding Supporting Actor in a Drama Series	Robert Walden as Joe Rossi		Nominated	
1981	Outstanding Supporting Actress in a Drama Series	Linda Kelsey as Billie Newman		Nominated	
1981	Outstanding Supporting Actress in a Drama Series	Nancy Marchand as Margaret Pynchon		Won	
1981	Outstanding Directing in a Drama Series	Burt Brinckerhoff	for "Pack"	Nominated	
1981	Outstanding Directing in a Drama Series	Gene Reynolds	for "Strike"	Nominated	
1981	Outstanding Writing in a Drama Series	Seth Freeman	for "Rape"	Nominated	
1981	Outstanding Writing in a Drama Series	April Smith	for "Strike"	Nominated	
1982	Outstanding Drama Series	Seth Freeman and Gene Reynolds		Nominated	
1982	Outstanding Lead Actor in a Drama Series	Ed Asner as Lou Grant		Nominated	
1982	Outstanding Supporting Actress in a Drama Series	Linda Kelsey as Billie Newman		Nominated	
1982	Outstanding Supporting Actress in a Drama Series	Nancy Marchand as Margaret Pynchon		Won	
1982	Outstanding Directing in a Drama Series	Gene Reynolds	for "Hometown"	Nominated	
1982	Outstanding Writing in a Drama Series	Seth Freeman	for "Blacklist"	Nominated	

==== Creative Arts Emmy Awards ====
Year	Category	Nominee(s)	Episodes(s)	Result	Ref
1978	Outstanding Achievement in Film Sound Editing for a Series	Ron Clark, Tony Garber, and Dale Johnston	for "Nazi"	Nominated	
1979	Outstanding Film Editing for a Series	James Galloway	for "Hooker"	Nominated	
1979	Outstanding Music Composition for a Series	Patrick Williams	for "Prisoner"	Nominated	
1980	Outstanding Music Composition for a Series (Dramatic Underscore)	Patrick Williams	for "Hollywood"	Won	
1981	Outstanding Achievement in Film Editing for a Series	James Galloway	for "Strike"	Nominated	
1981	Outstanding Achievement in Hairstyling	Jean Austin	for "Stroke"	Nominated	
1981	Outstanding Achievement in Music Composition for a Series (Dramatic Underscore)	Patrick Williams	for "Stroke"	Nominated	
1982	Outstanding Cinematography for a Series	Robert F. Liu	for "Ghosts"	Nominated	
1982	Outstanding Achievement in Music Composition for a Series (Dramatic Underscore)	Patrick Williams	for "Stroke"	Nominated	

=== Golden Globe Awards ===
The Golden Globe Award is an annual accolade presented by the Hollywood Foreign Press Association (HFPA) which honors the best performances in television and film. Lou Grant received 12 nominations, winning three awards – two for Best Actor – Television Series Drama (Ed Asner) and one for Best Television Series – Drama.

Year	Category	Nominee(s)	Result	Ref
1977	Best Actor – Television Series Drama	Ed Asner as Lou Grant	Won	
1978	Best Television Series – Drama		Nominated	
1978	Best Actor – Television Series Drama	Ed Asner as Lou Grant	Nominated	
1978	Best Supporting Actress – Series, Miniseries or Television Film	Linda Kelsey as Billie Newman	Nominated	
1979	Best Television Series – Drama		Won	
1979	Best Actor – Television Series Drama	Ed Asner as Lou Grant	Won	
1979	Best Supporting Actress – Series, Miniseries or Television Film	Linda Kelsey as Billie Newman	Nominated	
1980	Best Television Series – Drama		Nominated	
1980	Best Actor – Television Series Drama	Ed Asner as Lou Grant	Nominated	
1980	Best Supporting Actress – Series, Miniseries or Television Film	Linda Kelsey as Billie Newman	Nominated	
1981	Best Television Series – Drama		Nominated	
1981	Best Actor – Television Series Drama	Ed Asner as Lou Grant	Nominated	

=== Golden Reel Awards ===
The Golden Reel Award is an annual award presented by the Motion Picture Sound Editors (MPSE) in recognition of sound editors in film and television. Lou Grant won an award for Television One Hour Series: Sound Editing.

Year	Category	Nominee(s)	Episode(s)	Result	Ref
1980	Television One Hour Series: Sound Editing	Dale Johnston and Jayme S. Parker		Nominated	

=== Edgar Awards ===
The Edgar Awards, presented by the Mystery Writers of America since 1946, recognizes the best in mystery fiction, non-fiction, television, film, and theater. Lou Grant received a nomination for Best Television Episode.

Year	Category	Nominee(s)	Episode(s)	Result	Ref
1980	Best Television Episode	Michele Gallery	for "A Hollywood Whodunit"	Nominated	

=== Humanitas Prize ===
Awarded since 1974, the Humanitas Prize is an annual accolade that recognizes outstanding achievement of writers in film and television whose work promotes human dignity, meaning and freedom. Receiving four nominations for the 60 Minute Category, Lou Grant received two awards.

Year	Category	Nominee(s)	Episode(s)	Result	Ref
1979	60 Minute Category	Michele Gallery	for "Dying"	Nominated	
1979	60 Minute Category	Leon Tokatyan		Won	
1981	60 Minute Category	Bud Freeman	for "Streets"	Nominated	
1982	60 Minute Category	Gene Reynolds		Won	

=== Peabody Awards ===
Awarded since 1940, the Peabody Award, named after American banker and philanthropist George Peabody, is an annual award the recognizes excellence in storytelling across mediums including television, radio, television networks, and online videos. Lou Grant won in 1978, with the board praising Ed Asner's portrayal of the titular character as well as the cast and crew.

Year	Nominee(s)	Episode(s)	Result	Ref
1978	MTM Productions, CBS-TV		Won	

=== Writers Guild of America Awards ===
The Writers Guild of America Award, presented by the Writers Guild of America, is an annual accolade that honors excellence among writers in film, television, radio, promotional writing and videogames. Lou Grant received 14 nominations, winning two awards for Television: Episodic Drama.

Year	Category	Nominee(s)	Episode(s)	Result	Ref
1977	Television: Episodic Drama	David Lloyd	for "Christmas"	Nominated	
1977	Television: Episodic Drama	Leonora Thuna	for "Housewarming"	Nominated	
1978	Television: Episodic Drama	Seth Freeman	for "Prisoner"	Won	
1978	Television: Episodic Drama	Gary David Goldberg	for "Murder"	Nominated	
1979	Television: Episodic Drama	Johnny Dawkins	for "Slammer"	Nominated	
1979	Television: Episodic Drama	Gary David Goldberg	for "Home"	Nominated	
1979	Television: Episodic Drama	David Lloyd	for "Exposé"	Nominated	
1979	Television: Episodic Drama	Leon Tokatyan	for "Vet"	Won	
1980	Television: Episodic Drama	Allan Burns and Gene Reynolds	for "Brushfire"	Nominated	
1980	Television: Episodic Drama	Steve Kline	for "Blackout"	Nominated	
1980	Television: Episodic Drama	April Smith	for "Inheritance"	Nominated	
1981	Television: Episodic Drama	April Smith	for "Strike"	Nominated	
1981	Television: Episodic Drama	Michael Vittes	for "Campesinos"	Nominated	
1982	Television: Episodic Drama	Jeffrey Lane	for "Review"	Nominated	
