= David Blewitt =

American cinematographer and film editor

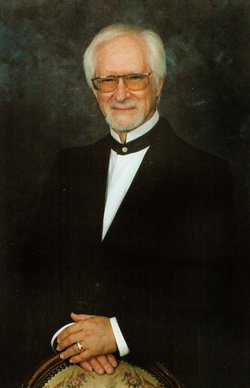
- Born: August 7, 1928; Los Angeles, California, United States
- Died: July 8, 2010 (aged 81); Sherman Oaks, Los Angeles, California, United States
- Occupation: Film editor
- Relatives: Edward Francis Blewitt (paternal grandfather); Joe Biden (first cousin once removed)

David Edward Blewitt (August 7, 1928 – July 8, 2010) was an American Academy Award-nominated and Emmy-winning film editor, whose credits included Ghostbusters in 1984. Blewitt earned an Academy Award nomination for his work on The Competition in 1980.

== Early life ==
Blewitt was born in Los Angeles, California, on August 7, 1928. He began his career in the entertainment industry by working as an usher at the Orpheum Theatre in Los Angeles when he was 15 years old. Blewitt enlisted in the United States Army Air Forces during World War II, where he worked as an aerial reconnaissance photographer. Blewitt returned to Los Angeles after World War II, where he initially worked as a cinematographer. His cinematography television credits included Hollywood and the Stars.

He transitioned to film editing when he joined David L. Wolper Productions where he met, and often collaborated with, Jack Haley Jr. Their joint productions included That's Entertainment! in 1974, That's Entertainment, Part II in 1976 and Life Goes to War: Hollywood and the Home Front. Blewitt's other credits with Wolper Prods. included Movin' with Nancy and The Undersea World of Jacques Cousteau.

Blewitt's larger, feature film credits included Butterflies Are Free, a 1972 film starring Goldie Hawn, and The Buddy Holly Story in 1978. He received an Academy Award nomination for The Competition, directed by Joel Oliansky. Blewitt was best associated with his editing in the 1984 blockbuster, Ghostbusters.

Blewitt's later television work included Hercules: The Legendary Journeys.

Blewitt won an Emmy Award in 1993 for editing in the television special, Bob Hope: The First 90 Years. In addition to his Emmy and Academy Award nominations, Blewitt received two ACE Eddie Awards from the American Cinema Editors, out of a total five nominations during his 40-year career. He was also a recipient of the American Cinema Editors Career Achievement Award in 2004.

David Blewitt died of complications from Parkinson's disease on July 8, 2010, at his home in Sherman Oaks, California, at the age of 81. He was survived by his wife, Ann; daughter, Risa Bastien, and Risa's husband, Steve Bastien; and his granddaughter, Annabel.

Blewitt was a first cousin once removed of U.S. President Joe Biden through his grandfather Edward Francis Blewitt, who was the maternal grandfather of Biden's mother Catherine Eugenia Finnegan.

== Filmography ==
Editor
| Year | Film | Director | Notes |
|---|---|---|---|
| 1971 | The Love Machine | Jack Haley Jr. | |
| 1972 | Hammersmith Is Out | Peter Ustinov | |
| 1972 | Butterflies Are Free | Milton Katselas | First collaboration with Milton Katselas |
| 1973 | 40 Carats | Milton Katselas | Second collaboration with Milton Katselas |
| 1975 | Report to the Commissioner | Milton Katselas | Third collaboration with Milton Katselas |
| 1978 | The Buddy Holly Story | Steve Rash | First collaboration with Steve Rash |
| 1979 | Steel | Steve Carver | |
| 1980 | In God We Trust | Marty Feldman | |
| 1980 | The Competition | Joel Oliansky | |
| 1981 | Under the Rainbow | Steve Rash | Second collaboration with Steve Rash |
| 1983 | Smokey and the Bandit Part 3 | Dick Lowry | |
| 1983 | D.C. Cab | Joel Schumacher | First collaboration with Joel Schumacher |
| 1984 | Ghostbusters | Ivan Reitman | |
| 1985 | Fast Forward | Sidney Poitier | |
| 1986 | Psycho III | Anthony Perkins | |
| 1987 | Hell Hunters | Ernst R. von Theumer | |
| 1988 | Moonwalker | Colin Chilvers | "Smooth Criminal" segment |

Editorial department
| Year | Film | Director | Role | Notes |
|---|---|---|---|---|
| 1990 | Flatliners | Joel Schumacher | Additional editor | Second collaboration with Joel Schumacher |
| 1991 | Dying Young | Joel Schumacher | Additional editor | Third collaboration with Joel Schumacher |

Additional crew
| Year | Film | Director | Role |
|---|---|---|---|
| 1961 | Night Tide | Curtis Harrington | Production assistant |

Documentaries

Editor
| Year | Film | Director |
|---|---|---|
| 1973 | Wattstax | Mel Stuart |
| 1974 | That's Entertainment! | Jack Haley Jr. |
| 1976 | That's Entertainment, Part II | Gene Kelly |
| 1977 | Life Goes to War: Hollywood and the Home Front | Jack Haley Jr. |

Camera and electrical department
| Year | Film | Director | Role |
|---|---|---|---|
| 1973 | Wattstax | Mel Stuart | Photography: Concert |

Shorts

Cinematographer
| Year | Film | Director |
|---|---|---|
| 1974 | Just One More Time | Michael J. Shapiro |

TV documentaries

Editor
| Year | Film | Director |
|---|---|---|
| 1965 | The Way Out Men | Mel Stuart |
| 1965 | The Teenage Revolution | Kent Mackenzie |
| 1965 | Pro Football: Mayhem on a Sunday Afternoon | William Friedkin |
| 1965 | In Search of Man | Eugene S. Jones |
| 1966 | The Thin Blue Line | William Friedkin |
| 1966 | Wall Street: Where the Money Is | Mel Stuart |
| 1966 | The World of Animals: It's a Dog's World | Alan Landsburg; Joseph L. Scanlan |
| 1966 | The Making of a President: 1964 | Mel Stuart |
| 1967 | A Nation of Immigrants | Robert Abel; Aram Boyajian; Mel Stuart |
| 1968 | The World of Animals: The World of Horses | Joseph L. Scanlan |
| 1969 | Hollywood: The Selznick Years | Marshall Flaum |
| 1970 | The Undersea World of Jacques Cousteau: Tragedy of the Red Salmon | Jacques Renoir |
| 1982 | Hollywood: The Gift of Laughter | Jack Haley Jr. |
| 1990 | The Wonderful Wizard of Oz: 50 Years of Magic | Jack Haley Jr. |
| 1993 | Bob Hope: The First 90 Years | Allan Kartun |

Camera and electrical department
| Year | Film | Director | Role |
|---|---|---|---|
| 1965 | The Incredible World of James Bond | Jack Haley Jr. | Cinematographer: Hollywood |

Cinematographer
| Year | Film | Director |
|---|---|---|
| 1965 | Revolution in Our Time | David H. Vowell |
| 1965 | Pro Football: Mayhem on a Sunday Afternoon | William Friedkin |
| 1968 | The World of Animals: The World of Horses | Joseph L. Scanlan |
| 1968 | The World of Animals: Big Cats, Little Cats | Bud Wiser |

TV series

Editor
| Year | Title | Notes |
|---|---|---|
| 1965 | Men in Crisis | 1 episode |
| 1965−66 | Time-Life Specials: The March of Time | 9 episodes |
| 1967 | Untamed Frontier | 1 episode |
| 1967−69 | National Geographic Specials | 4 episodes |
| 1970 | The Undersea World of Jacques Cousteau | 2 episodes |
| 1993 | Key West | 1 episode |
| 1995−99 | Hercules: The Legendary Journeys | 3 episodes |
| 2000 | Xena: Warrior Princess | 1 episode |

Editorial department
| Year | Title | Role | Notes |
|---|---|---|---|
| 1963−64 | Hollywood and the Stars | Assistant editor | 6 episodes |

Camera and electrical department
| Year | Title | Role | Notes |
|---|---|---|---|
| 1974 | ABC Late Night | Special photography | 1 episode |

Cinematographer
| Year | Title | Notes |
|---|---|---|
| 1964 | Hollywood and the Stars | 6 episodes |

Producer
| Year | Title | Credit | Notes |
|---|---|---|---|
| 1993 | Key West | Associate producer | 12 episodes |

TV specials

Editor
| Year | Title | Director |
|---|---|---|
| 1967 | With Love, Sophia | Michael Pfleghar |
| 1967 | Movin' with Nancy | Jack Haley Jr. |
| 1968 | Monte Carlo: C'est La Rose | Michael Pfleghar |
| 1968 | The Beat of the Brass | Jack Haley Jr. |

Camera and electrical department
| Year | Film | Director | Role |
|---|---|---|---|
| 1965 | The Incredible World of James Bond | Jack Haley Jr. | Cinematographer: Hollywood |
