= Arthur Piasecki =

American politician

Arthur A. Piasecki

Member of the Pennsylvania Senate from the 22nd district
- In office January 7, 1967 – November 30, 1970
- Preceded by: Bob Casey
- Succeeded by: Bob Mellow

Personal details
- Born: May 5, 1917 Scranton, Pennsylvania, U.S.
- Died: August 13, 1986 (aged 69) Scranton, Pennsylvania, U.S.
- Party: Republican

Arthur A. Piasecki (May 5, 1917 – August 13, 1986 ) was an American politician from Pennsylvania who served as a Republican member of the Pennsylvania State Senate for the 22nd district from 1969 to 1970.
