= James Shaner =

American politician

James E. Shaner

Member of the Pennsylvania House of Representatives from the 52nd district
- In office January 3, 1995 – November 30, 2006
- Preceded by: Rich Kasunic
- Succeeded by: Deberah Kula

Personal details
- Born: September 21, 1936 Connellsville, Pennsylvania
- Died: April 15, 2012 (aged 75) Uniontown, Pennsylvania
- Party: Democratic
- Spouse: Mabel Jeanette
- Children: 1 child
- Education: Fairmont State University

James Edward Shaner (September 21, 1936 – April 15, 2012) was a Democratic member of the Pennsylvania House of Representatives.

== Biography ==
Shaner graduated from Uniontown Senior High School. He earned a bachelor's degree from Fairmont State College and a Master's degree from West Virginia University. He also attended classes at California University of Pennsylvania.

He was first elected to represent the 52nd legislative district in 1994. Shaner underwent heart bypass surgery in October 2005. He announced his retirement in February 2006, citing health concerns.

In 2007, it was revealed that Shaner, as a lame duck legislator, attended legislative training trips at the public's expense after his defeat.

== Death ==
Shaner died on April 15, 2012, in LaFayette Manor in Uniontown, Pennsylvania.
