= Ryan Warner =

American politician

Member of the Pennsylvania House of Representatives from the 52nd district
- Incumbent
- Assumed office January 6, 2015
- Preceded by: Deberah Kula

Personal details
- Party: Republican
- Spouse: Leslie
- Children: Ben and Paloma
- Education: Penn State
- Occupation: State Representative
- Website: www.repwarner.com

Ryan Warner is a member of the Pennsylvania House of Representatives, representing the 52nd House district in Fayette County and Westmoreland County, Pennsylvania.

== Career ==
=== Committee assignments ===
- Appropriations
- Consumer Affairs
- Environmental Resources & Energy, Subcommittee on Energy - Chair
- Transportation

== Personal ==
Ryan graduated from Frazier High School in Perryopolis in 2001.

== Political positions ==
Warner is considered politically conservative. The American Conservative Union's Center for Legislative Accountability gives him a lifetime rating of 91.78.
