= Harry Young Cochran =

American politician

Member of the Pennsylvania House of Representatives from the 52nd district
- In office 1979–1982
- Preceded by: J. William Lincoln
- Succeeded by: Rich Kasunic

Personal details
- Born: September 1, 1948 (age 77)
- Party: Democratic

Harry Young Cochran (born September 1, 1948) is an American politician who was a Democratic member of the Pennsylvania House of Representatives.
