= Pennsylvania's 22nd Senate district =

American legislative district

Pennsylvania's 22nd State Senate district
Senator
Marty Flynn; D–Scranton
- Population (2021): 251,084

Pennsylvania State Senate District 22 includes parts of Lackawanna County and Luzerne County. It is currently represented by Democrat Marty Flynn.

== District profile ==
The district includes the following areas:

Lackawanna County

- Benton Township
- Clarks Green
- Clarks Summit
- Dalton
- Dickson City
- Dunmore
- Glenburn Township
- Greenfield Township
- La Plume Township
- Moosic
- Newton Township
- North Abington Township
- Old Forge
- Ransom Township
- Scott Township
- Scranton
- South Abington Township
- Taylor
- Throop
- Waverly Township
- West Abington Township

Luzerne County

- Avoca
- Dupont
- Duryea
- Hughestown
- Jenkins Township
- Laflin
- Laurel Run
- Pittston
- Pittston Township
- Plains Township
- West Pittston
- Wilkes-Barre City
- Wilkes-Barre Township
- Wyoming
- Yatesville

== Popular culture ==
This seat is the one represented by Robert Lipton and later competed for by Oscar Martinez on NBC's hit show The Office.

== Senators ==
Representative	Party	Years	District home	Note
William Piper	Democratic-Republican	1821 – 1832		Pennsylvania State Senator for the 14th district from 1817 to 1820. U.S. Representative for Pennsylvania's 7th congressional district from 1811 to 1813 and Pennsylvania's 8th congressional district from 1813 to 1817
David Mann	Democratic-Republican	1823 – 1824		Pennsylvania State Senator for the 14th district from 1821 to 1822
Chauncey Forward	Democratic-Republican	1823 – 1826		Pennsylvania State Representative from 1820 to 1822. U.S. Representative for Pennsylvania's 13th congressional district from 1826 to 1831.
Alexander Ogle	Jackson Democrat	1827 – 1828		Pennsylvania State Representative from 1803-1804, 1807-1808, 1811 and 1817-1823. Major General in the Pennsylvania militia during the war of 1812. U.S. Representative for Pennsylvania's 8th congressional district from 1817 to 1819.
Henry Humbert Fore	Democratic	1833 – 1836		
Samuel Hays	Democratic	1839 – 1842		Pennsylvania State Representative in 1813, 1816, 1823 and 1825. U.S. Representative for Pennsylvania's 22nd congressional district from 1843 to 1845
Charles Alexander Black	Democratic	1845 – 1848		Pennsylvania State Senator for the 18th district from 1843 to 1844
Maxwell McCaslin	Democratic	1849 – 1852		Pennsylvania State Senator for the 23rd district from 1853 to 1854
James Carothers	Whig	1851 – 1852		
George Darsie	Republican	1853 – 1854		Pennsylvania State Senator for the 19th district from 1841 to 1842 and the 24th district from 1843 to 1850
Jonas Roup McClintock	Democratic	1853 – 1856		8th mayor of Pittsburgh from 1836 to 1839. Pennsylvania State Representative from 1850 to 1854
William Wilkins	Democratic	1857 – 1858		Pennsylvania State Representative from 1819 to 1820. Judge of the United States District Court for the Western District of Pennsylvania from 1824 to 1831. U.S. Senator from Pennsylvania from 1831 to 1834. U.S. Minister to Russia from 1834 to 1835. U.S. Congressman for Pennsylvania's 21st congressional district from 1843 to 1844. 19th U.S. Secretary of War from 1844 to 1845.
Jacob Turney	Democratic	1857 – 1860		Elected President of the Senate in 1859. U.S. Representative for Pennsylvania's 21st congressional district from 1875 to 1879.
Smith Fuller	Republican	1861 – 1862		
John Latta	Democratic	1863 – 1864		Pennsylvania State Senator for the 23rd district from 1865 to 1866. Pennsylvania State Representative from 1872 to 1873. First Lieutenant Governor of Pennsylvania from 1875 to 1879.
Thomas St. Clair	Republican	1865 – 1866		Pennsylvania State Senator for the 37th district from 1877 to 1880
Robert Bruce Petriken	Democratic	1873 – 1874		Pennsylvania State Senator for the 21st district from 1871 to 1872
David McLean Crawford	Democratic	1873 – 1874		Pennsylvania State Senator for the 21st district from 1871 to 1872 and the 31st district from 1877 to 1880
Joseph S. Waream	Democratic	1873 – 1876		
Charlton Burnett	Democratic	1877 – 1878		Pennsylvania State Senator for the 10th district from 1867 to 1868
Allen Craig	Democratic	1879 – 1882		
John D. Biddis	Democratic	1883 – 1886		
Joseph Horace Shull	Democratic	1887 – 1890		U.S. Representative for Pennsylvania's 26th congressional district from 1903 to 1905
William M. Rapsher	Democratic	1891 – 1894		
Lafayette Rowland	Democratic	1895 – 1898		
David S. Lee	Democratic	1899 – 1902		
Jacob Gilbert Zern	Fusion Democrat	1903 – 1906		
Edward Francis Blewitt	Democratic	1907 – 1910		Maternal great-grandfather to Joe Biden
Walter McNichols	Republican	1911 – 1914		
William M. Lynch	Republican	1915 – 1918		
Albert J. Davis	Republican	1919 – 1930		
John W. Howell	Republican	1931 – 1938		
Edward J. Coleman	Democratic	1939 – 1946		
Fraser P. Donlan	Republican	1947 – 1950		
Hugh J. McMenamin	Democratic	1951 – 1962		
Robert P. Casey	Democratic	1963 – 1968		Auditor General of Pennsylvania from 1969 to 1977. 42nd Governor of Pennsylvania from 1987 to 1995. Father to Bob Casey Jr., Senator from Pennsylvania.
Arthur A. Piasecki	Republican	1969 – 1970		
Robert J. Mellow	Democratic	1971 – 2010		Minority floor leader from 1994 to 2010. President pro tempore from 1992 to 1994. Served 16 months in prison for conspiracy to commit mail fraud and filing a false tax return
John P. Blake	Democratic	2011 – 2021		Resigned to work for Congressman Matt Cartwright.
Marty Flynn	Democratic	2021 – present	Scranton	Incumbent
