= Bob Casey Sr. =

Governor of Pennsylvania from 1987 to 1995

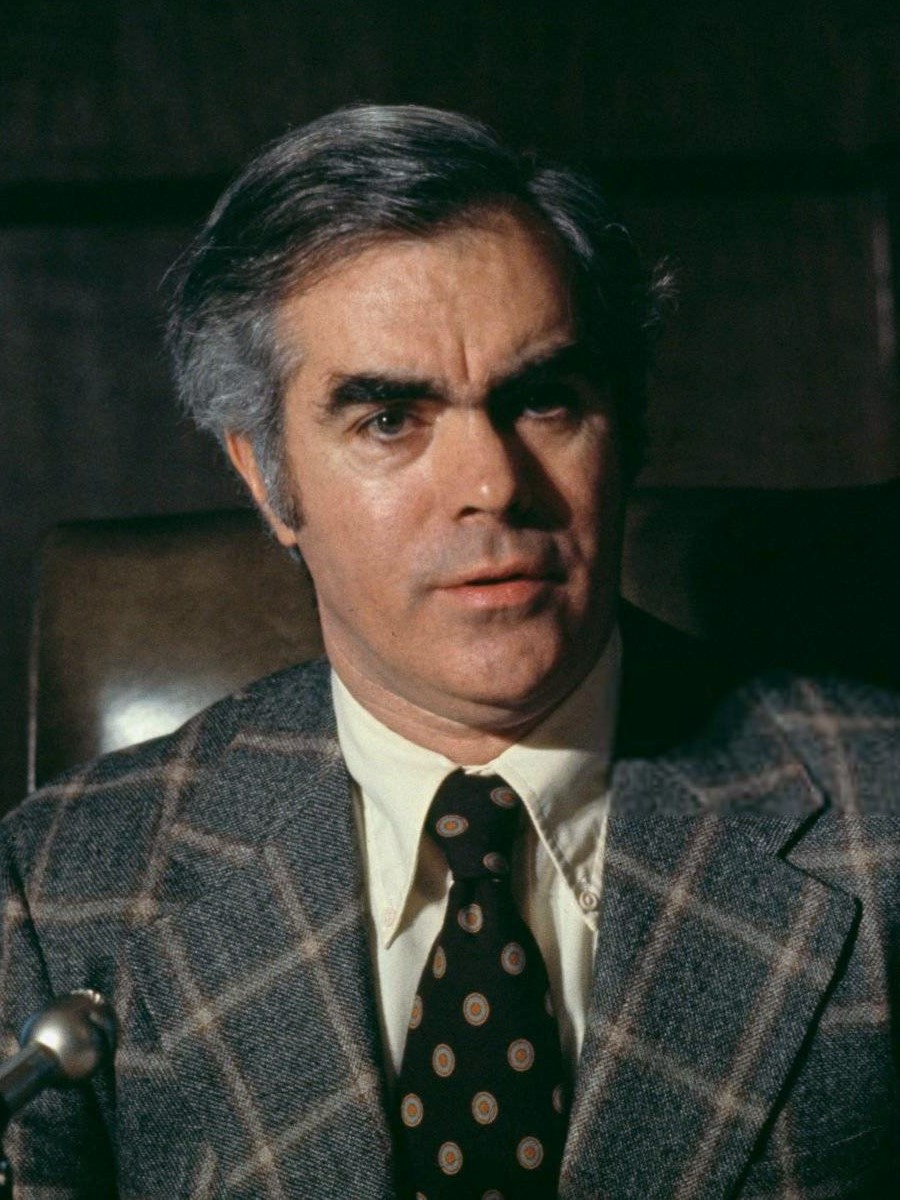
- Casey in 1974

42nd Governor of Pennsylvania
- In office January 20, 1987 – January 17, 1995
- Lieutenant: Mark Singel
- Preceded by: Dick Thornburgh
- Succeeded by: Tom Ridge

43rd Auditor General of Pennsylvania
- In office January 18, 1969 – January 21, 1977
- Governor: Raymond P. Shafer; Milton Shapp
- Preceded by: Grace M. Sloan
- Succeeded by: Al Benedict

Member of the Pennsylvania Senate from the 22nd district
- In office January 1, 1963 – November 30, 1968
- Preceded by: Hugh J. McMenamin
- Succeeded by: Arthur Piasecki

Personal details
- Born: Robert Patrick Casey; January 9, 1932 New York City, U.S.
- Died: May 30, 2000 (aged 68) Scranton, Pennsylvania, U.S.
- Resting place: Saint Catherine's Cemetery, Moscow, Pennsylvania, U.S.
- Party: Democratic
- Spouse: Ellen Harding (m. 1953)
- Children: 8, including Bob Jr.
- Education: College of the Holy Cross (BA); George Washington University (JD)

Robert Patrick Casey (January 9, 1932 – May 30, 2000) was an American lawyer and politician from Pennsylvania who served as the 42nd governor of Pennsylvania from 1987 to 1995. He served as a member of the Pennsylvania Senate for the 22nd district from 1963 to 1968 and as Auditor General of Pennsylvania from 1969 to 1977.

Casey was best known for leading the anti-abortion wing of the Democratic Party, spearheading the opposition against Planned Parenthood v. Casey, a landmark Supreme Court decision on abortion. He championed unions, believed in government as a beneficent force, and supported gun rights.

His son, Bob Casey Jr., also served as Auditor General of Pennsylvania and went on to serve as Pennsylvania Treasurer and as a U.S. Senator, from 2007 to 2025.

== Early life and education ==
Robert Patrick Casey was born on January 9, 1932, in Jackson Heights, Queens, the son of Alphonsus Liguori and Marie (née Cummings) Casey. His family, of Irish descent, was originally from Scranton, Pennsylvania, but his parents moved to New York in order for his father, a devoutly Roman Catholic former coal miner who began working as a coal miner at age 10, to attend Fordham University School of Law. The family returned to Scranton following Casey's birth.

After graduating from Scranton Preparatory School, Casey received an offer to play for the Philadelphia Phillies in 1949, but refused. He attended the College of the Holy Cross on a basketball scholarship instead and became the president of his senior class. As an undergraduate at Holy Cross, he played for the Holy Cross Crusaders with future NBA player Bob Cousy. He graduated with a Bachelor of Arts, cum laude, in 1953, then earned his Juris Doctor from George Washington University in 1956.

Upon graduation and admission to the bar, Casey worked for the Washington, D.C., law firm Covington & Burling, where he remained until returning to Scranton in 1958 to enter solo practice.

== Political career ==
=== State senate ===
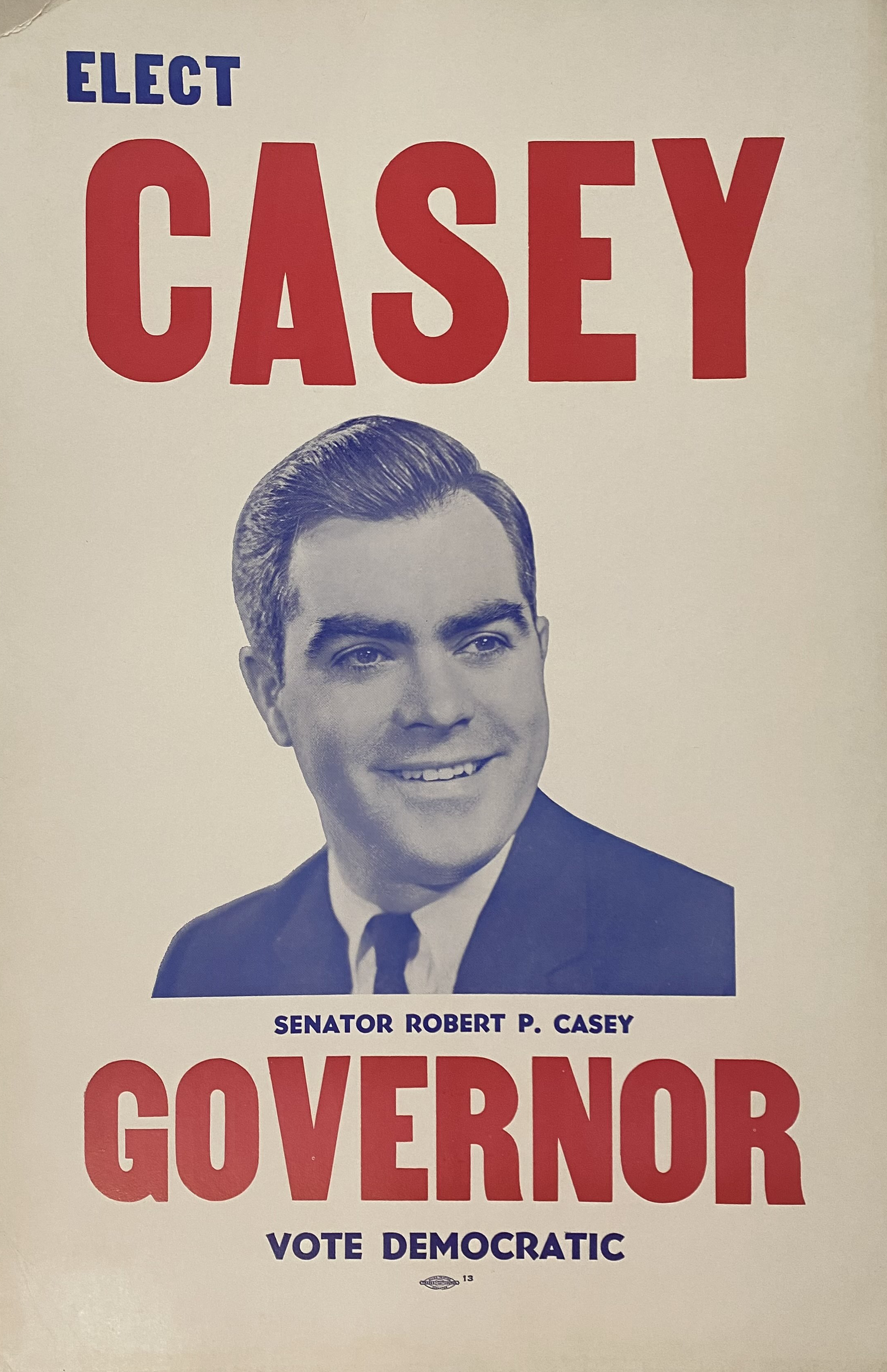
"Elect Casey Governor" poster, 1966

Casey served as a Democratic Party member of the Pennsylvania State Senate for the 22nd district from 1963 to 1968. He first sought the office of Governor of Pennsylvania in 1966, losing the Democratic Party primary to Milton Shapp. Casey was the candidate of the party establishment, but the independently wealthy Shapp ran a successful insurgent campaign for the nomination. Casey tried on two other occasions without success, in 1970 (again losing to Shapp) and again in 1978 (losing to Pete Flaherty). Considered a moderate and despite growing frustration with Democratic Party policies, Casey rejected Republican offers to run for governor on their ticket on two occasions.

=== Auditor general ===
In 1968 and 1972 Casey was elected to the post of Auditor General of Pennsylvania. Paul Beers in his 1980 book "Pennsylvania Politics Today and Yesterday: The Tolerable Accommodation", wrote that Casey was "regarded as the finest auditor general the Commonwealth ever had." During his term as Auditor General, Casey was noted for feuding with then-governor Shapp over Pennsylvania's pension system and exposing corruption. Before Casey, the auditor general's office had no public accountants, who hired 24 of them. Beers notes that during his two terms, "Contracts for day care, Medicare, the Farm Show, highways, [Milton] Shapp's pet dream of a Pocono Arts Center, and property leases were all investigated and audited thoroughly by Casey, with accompanying headlines when he uncovered mistakes or petty corruptions."

=== Third gubernatorial run and mistaken identity ===
Restricted from seeking another term as Auditor General of Pennsylvania, Casey declined to seek the office of Pennsylvania Treasurer in 1976. Instead, a Cambria County recorder of deeds named Robert E. Casey won the Democratic primary and the general election, spending virtually no money and doing virtually no campaigning; voters merely assumed they were voting for the outgoing auditor general.

In 1978, Casey ran in the Democratic primary for governor, losing to Pete Flaherty. Some attributed his loss to the fact that another candidate named Robert P. Casey, this one a teacher and ice cream parlor owner from Monroeville, Pennsylvania, ran in the same primary for lieutenant governor. Casey the teacher received the Democratic party's nomination for lieutenant governor, again with a no-spending, no-campaigning strategy. This Casey, who then joined Democratic ticket with gubernatorial nominee Pete Flaherty, narrowly lost to Richard Thornburgh and William Scranton III.

There was also a Robert J. Casey who sought a congressional seat in Western Pennsylvania and a Dennis Casey who ran for Pennsylvania State Senate.

In 1980 the Republicans launched an extensive advertising campaign to clarify that "Casey isn't Casey," and the Democratic state treasurer was defeated for re-election, losing to R. Budd Dwyer.

=== Fourth gubernatorial run and election ===
After a decade practicing law, Casey made a fourth bid for governor in 1986, billing himself as the "real Bob Casey" to distinguish himself and make light of the mistaken identity follies of the past. Dubbed "the three-time loss from Holy Cross" by detractors, Casey hired two then generally unknown political strategists, James Carville and Paul Begala, to lead his campaign staff.

Unlike his three previous tries, Casey won the Democratic primary, defeating Philadelphia district attorney (and future Philadelphia Mayor and two term governor) Ed Rendell. He then faced Thornburgh's lieutenant governor, Bill Scranton in the general election. The race was considered too close to call until three weeks before the election, when a poster appeared statewide, depicting Scranton as a "dope smoking hippie". Casey condemned this poster in The Pittsburgh Press on October 18, 1986. On the Saturday before election day, however, Carville launched the now infamous "guru ad", a TV advert which attacked Scranton's practice of transcendental meditation. Casey defeated Scranton by 79,216 votes.

== Governorship ==
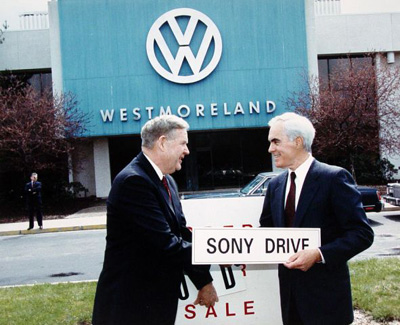
Casey (right) with Congressman John Murtha

Inaugurated on January 20, 1987, Casey was immediately confronted with several serious issues. Just two days into his term, R. Budd Dwyer, the state treasurer who had been convicted on charges of accepting kickbacks, committed suicide at a televised press conference in the Pennsylvania State Capitol Complex. Casey brought what he called an "activist government" to Pennsylvania, expanding health care services for women, introducing reforms to the state's welfare system, and introducing an insurance program for uninsured children (which became a model for the successful SCHIP program later adopted nationwide). House Bill 20, entitled the Children's Health Insurance Act, created the Children's Health Insurance Program (CHIP) in Pennsylvania. According to PA's CHIP website, "Pennsylvania's CHIP program would later be used as the model for the federal government's SCHIP program. Legislation for the federal CHIP program was signed into law August 5, 1997, by former president Bill Clinton."

Casey also introduced a "capital for a day" program, where the state's official business was conducted from eighteen different communities throughout the state. Despite charges that his administration squandered a budget surplus and ran the state into record annual budget deficits, Casey remained popular with voters, easily winning re-election in 1990 against abortion-rights Republican nominee Barbara Hafer. Polling data showed that abortion attitudes were a stronger predictor of vote choice than party affiliation.

=== Abortion ===
Governor Casey was well known as a staunch Roman Catholic anti-abortion advocate. In 1989, Casey pushed through the legislature the "Pennsylvania Abortion Control Act", which placed limitations on abortion, including the notification of parents of minors, a twenty-four-hour waiting period, and a ban on partial-birth procedures except in cases of risk to the life of the mother. Planned Parenthood of Southeastern Pennsylvania sued, with Casey as the named defendant, asserting that the law violated Roe v. Wade.

The case went to the United States Supreme Court in April 1992. On June 29, 1992, in the case of Planned Parenthood v. Casey, the Supreme Court upheld all of Pennsylvania's restrictions except one (the requirement for spousal notification) allowing states to impose certain restrictions, but still affirming the right to an abortion found in Roe.

==== 1992 Democratic National Convention controversy ====
Considering abortion a key social issue for the 1992 presidential election, Casey tried to get a speaking slot to give a minority plank on the topic at the 1992 Democratic National Convention. He was not given a speaking slot and said in a series of news conferences the party was censoring his anti-abortion views even though he agreed with the party on nearly all other issues. And after a speech by another abortion-rights supporter from Pennsylvania, DNC supporters actually sent a camera crew in search of Casey to humiliate him.

After the convention, convention organizers tried to say that Casey was not allowed to speak because he did not support the Democratic ticket. Al Gore called Casey the next day to apologize.

Casey in his memoir correctly claimed that convention speaker Kathleen Brown had not endorsed the ticket due to bitterness over her brother Jerry Brown's losing the nomination. Despite holding out for a while, and even vowing to promote his own party platform even a few days prior to the start of the convention, Brown had come to quietly support the Clinton ticket as the convention got underway.

Several anti-abortion Democrats such as John Breaux addressed the convention, though did not speak directly on the issue of abortion. After the convention, Casey went on vacation rather than campaign for Clinton in Pennsylvania, which was a key swing state. He also refused to say whether he would campaign for the Democratic nominee, though he told The New York Times, "I support the ticket. Period." Several anti-abortion Democrats spoke at the convention, but they did not focus their remarks on abortion, and the issue was not debated the way that Casey had wanted.

=== Death penalty ===
Regarding capital punishment, Governor Casey's administration came under much criticism. In an interview with C-Span in 1992, Governor Casey stated: "I support the death penalty." However, Casey was criticized as being "wishy-washy" on the death penalty. Governor Casey during his term signed 21 execution warrants, but none of those were carried out, and upon entering office in 1987, dissolved a death warrant signed by his predecessor Dick Thornburgh, five days before it was stated to occur.

For a period of four years during his administration from May 1991 on, Casey refused to sign any death penalty warrants. In 1994, Casey vetoed a bill that would "require Casey and future governors to sign death warrants for condemned killers within 60 days after their death sentences are upheld by the state Supreme Court."

Casey would be forced to sign two death warrants after May 1991, after a lawsuit was brought by Northampton County District Attorney John Morganelli. The court ruled in Morganelli v. Casey, that Casey did not have the power to ignore death warrants. Pennsylvania resumed executions once Casey's successor, Tom Ridge, took office.

On November 29, 1990, Governor Casey signed a bill that eliminated the electric chair as a method of executions in Pennsylvania and replaced it by lethal injection.

=== U.S. Senate politics ===
On April 4, 1991, Casey was faced with filling a vacancy in the U.S. Senate when Republican U.S. Senator John Heinz died in a plane crash. After briefly considering appointing Chrysler Corporation Chairman Lee Iacocca, an Allentown native, Casey settled on state Secretary of Labor and Industry, and former Kennedy functionary Harris Wofford (despite private fears that he was too liberal for rural Pennsylvania voters). According to former Casey press secretary Vince Carocci, the Governor insisted on two conditions:

First, that Wofford would bring Carville and company on to manage his campaign for election; second, when the issue of abortion came up as it inevitably would, Harris would proclaim his support for the Pennsylvania Abortion Control Act, which already had its constitutionality upheld by the U.S. Supreme Court.

With those assurances in hand, Governor Casey appointed Wofford to the Senate, and then vigorously supported him in Wofford's uphill fight to remain in the Senate against former Pennsylvania Governor and U.S. Attorney General Dick Thornburgh in the special election held that fall. Thanks in large part to Casey's fundraising prowess and Carville's political ability, Senator Wofford scored an upset victory over Thornburgh. However, Casey and Wofford came into conflict during the early Clinton administration, when Wofford refused a personal plea by Casey to support an amendment similar to a provision in Casey's Pennsylvania Abortion Control Act. Casey made it very clear that if Wofford opposed the amendment, the Governor would withhold his support in Wofford's next Senate election. Wofford supported the amendment, but still was defeated in the 1994 election by two-term conservative Congressman Rick Santorum.

The footnote to this story came years after Governor Casey's death. By 2005, the Governor's son, Bob Casey Jr., had served two terms as auditor general and had been elected state treasurer the year before, crushing his opponent with over 3.3 million votes. Despite the younger Casey's anti-abortion views, National Democrats, led by Chuck Schumer, heavily recruited him to run in the 2006 election against Santorum, by now the number-three Republican in the Senate. Casey went on to win a landslide victory over Santorum.

=== Health issues ===
In October 1987, Casey suffered a heart attack and underwent quadruple coronary artery bypass surgery.

In 1991, during his second term, Casey was diagnosed with hereditary amyloidosis, an inherited condition characterized by the deposition of insoluble proteins in organs and tissues. Though rare, the disease had also claimed the lives of Pittsburgh Mayor Richard Caliguiri and Erie Mayor Louis Tullio in 1988 and 1990, respectively. To combat the disease, he underwent an extremely rare heart-liver transplant on the morning of June 14, 1993, at the University of Pittsburgh Medical Center.

Before undergoing the operation, he transferred executive authority to Lieutenant Governor Mark Singel, marking the first time Pennsylvania was under the leadership of an acting governor. Casey resumed his duties on December 13, 1993, almost six months to the day after he underwent the operation.

Following his operation, Casey strongly supported legislation that encouraged organ transplants by guaranteeing access to the families of potential organ donors by organ recovery organizations, providing drivers' license identification of potential donors, and establishing an organ donation trust fund from voluntary donations to promote the benefits of organ donation. The organ donation trust fund was named in his honor.

== Post-political career and death ==
Prohibited from seeking a third term, Casey left office on January 17, 1995. He contemplated a run for president to oppose Bill Clinton in the 1996 Democratic primaries, even going as far as to file paper needed to raise money for a presidential campaign in March 1995. However, he declined due to failing health.

In 1996, Casey published an autobiography titled "Fighting for Life".

Despite the transplants, Casey continued to suffer long-term effects of his disease and died of a viral infection on May 30, 2000, at age 68 in Mercy Hospital in Scranton. He is interred in Saint Catherine's Cemetery in Moscow, Pennsylvania.

He and his wife of forty-seven years, Ellen (née Harding) had eight children, including Bob Jr. Ellen died on August 11, 2023, at age 91.

Political offices
Preceded by Grace M. Sloan	Auditor General of Pennsylvania; 1969–1977	Succeeded by Al Benedict
Preceded by Dick Thornburgh	Governor of Pennsylvania; 1987–1995	Succeeded by Tom Ridge
Party political offices
Preceded by Grace M. Sloan	Democratic nominee for Auditor General of Pennsylvania; 1968, 1972	Succeeded by Al Benedict
Preceded by Allen Ertel	Democratic nominee for Governor of Pennsylvania; 1986, 1990	Succeeded by Mark Singel
