= Jacob Zern =

American politician (1845–1926)

Member of the Pennsylvania Senate from the 22nd district
- In office 1902–1906
- Succeeded by: Edward Francis Blewitt

Member of the Pennsylvania House of Representatives
- In office 1879–1882

Personal details
- Born: February 24, 1845 New Hanover Township, Pennsylvania, U.S.
- Died: March 20, 1926 (aged 81) Lehighton, Pennsylvania, U.S.
- Party: Democratic
- Other political affiliations: Fusion
- Education: University of Pennsylvania (MD)

Military service
- Branch/service: United States Army
- Battles/wars: American Civil War

Jacob Zern (February 24, 1845 – March 20, 1926) was an American physician, judge, and politician who served as a member of the Pennsylvania House of Representatives and Pennsylvania State Senate.

== Early life and education ==
Zern was born in New Hanover Township, Pennsylvania. Zern's father was a reverend. Zern was the descendant of immigrants from Germany. He attended local public schools and the Millersville State Normal School. Zern served in the American Civil War, where he was assigned to guard rail lines in Berkeley County, West Virginia. After he was discharged, Zern earned a Doctor of Medicine from the School of Medicine at the University of Pennsylvania.

== Career ==
In 1868, Zern established a private medical practice in Weissport, Pennsylvania. From 1879 to 1882, he served as a member of the Pennsylvania House of Representatives. He was then appointed to serve as a judge of Carbon County, Pennsylvania, from 1894 to 1899. In 1900, Zern launched an unsuccessful bid for Pennsylvania State Senate as a member of the Democratic Party. Zern then re-registered as a member of the Fusion Party and was elected in 1902, serving until 1906.

== Death ==
Zern died on March 20, 1926, in Lehighton, Pennsylvania.
