= John Blake (Pennsylvania politician) =

American politician (born 1960)

Member of the Pennsylvania Senate from the 22nd district
- In office January 4, 2011 – February 15, 2021
- Preceded by: Bob Mellow
- Succeeded by: Marty Flynn

Personal details
- Born: August 1, 1960 (age 66) Scranton, Pennsylvania, U.S.
- Party: Democratic
- Education: Villanova University; University of Scranton; Harvard University
- Profession: Legislator

John Blake (born August 1, 1960) is an American politician from Pennsylvania, United States, who served as a Democratic member of the Pennsylvania State Senate for the 22nd District from 2011 to 2021. He is currently the District Director and Senior Economic Development Specialist for Congressman Matt Cartwright.

== Early life and education ==
Blake received a bachelor's degree from Villanova University while playing on the school's football team. He also received a master's in social work from Marywood College and a master's in business administration from the University of Scranton.

Blake also completed Executive Education in Public Management at Harvard University's John F. Kennedy School of Government.

== Career ==
Blake began working in housing policy as director of the Lackawanna County Redevelopment Authority. Prior to entering electoral politics, he also held a two-year fellowship position under the U.S Department of Housing and Urban Development, a job as vice president for community development with PNC Bank, and an appointment as the Ed Rendell administration's director of policy for Northeastern Pennsylvania.

On February 15, 2021, Blake resigned from the Pennsylvania Senate to take a position leading economic development from Congressman Matt Cartwright.
