= Russell Blair =

American politician

Russell J. Blair

Member of the Pennsylvania House of Representatives from the 52nd district
- In office January 7, 1969 – November 30, 1972
- Preceded by: District Created
- Succeeded by: William Lincoln

Member of the Pennsylvania House of Representatives from the Fayette County district
- In office 1967–1968

Personal details
- Born: October 1, 1907 Perryopolis, Pennsylvania
- Died: March 12, 1994 (aged 86) Perryopolis, Pennsylvania
- Party: Democratic

Russell J. Blair (October 1, 1907 – March 12, 1994) was a Democratic member of the Pennsylvania House of Representatives.
