= Hugh J. McMenamin =

American politician (born 1916)

Member of the Pennsylvania Senate from the 22nd district
- In office 1951–1962
- Preceded by: Fraser P. Donlan
- Succeeded by: Bob Casey Sr.

Personal details
- Born: September 24, 1916 Scranton, Pennsylvania, U.S.
- Died: January 13, 1978 (aged 61) Scranton, Pennsylvania, U.S.
- Party: Democratic
- Spouse(s): Ann Drobnis (m. 1941) Edith Noone Bialkowski (m. 1977)
- Children: 2

Military service
- Allegiance: United States
- Branch/service: United States Navy
- Years of service: 1943-1946
- Rank: lieutenant junior grade
- Unit: USS O'Neill
- Battles/wars: World War II

Hugh Jennings McMenamin Sr. (September 24, 1916 – January 13, 1978) was an American politician of the Democratic Party who represented the 22nd district in the Pennsylvania Senate from 1951 to 1962.

== Early life and military service ==
McMenamin was born on September 24, 1916 in Scranton, Pennsylvania. He was the son of Hugh Aloysious McMenamin, a dentist, and Kathryn R. McMenamin (née Jennings). McMenamin graduated from Central High School. He later attended Mercersburg Academy and Sheffield Scientific College of Yale University. McMenamin graduated from Yale Law School in 1941. He served as an FBI agent in Seattle, New York City, and Washington, D.C.

Joining the United States Navy in 1943, McMenamin briefly toured in the North Atlantic on anti-submarine duty during World War II. He then served on the USS O'Neill as a supply disbursement officer in the Pacific theatre, participating in the battles of Luzon, Iwo Jima, and Okinawa. He ended his military service as a lieutenant junior grade in 1946.

== Career ==
McMenamin passed the bar in 1947. He was a member of the law firm of Henkelman, McMenamin, Kreder & O'Connell.

=== Pennsylvania Senate ===
McMenamin was elected as a Democrat to represent the 22nd district in the Pennsylvania Senate from 1951. In 1956, he was co-chairman of the Senate Investigating Committee. He introduced bills that would increase pensions for firefighters and policemen. He retired from the senate in 1962.

== Personal life and death ==
McMenamin married Ann Drobnis in 1941. They had two sons. He later married Edith Noone Bialkowski in 1977.

He was elected as state advocate to the Knights of Columbus in 1952.

McMenamin died at Moses Taylor Hospital in Scranton, Pennsylvania on January 13, 1978. He was buried in Cathedral Cemetery.
