= Deberah Kula =

American politician (born 1949)

Member of the Pennsylvania House of Representatives from the 52nd district
- In office January 2, 2007 – January 6, 2015
- Preceded by: James E. Shaner
- Succeeded by: Ryan Warner

Personal details
- Born: March 2, 1949 (age 77) Uniontown, Pennsylvania, U.S.
- Party: Democratic
- Spouse: Frank
- Children: 3

Deberah Kula (born March 2, 1949) is a former Democratic member of the Pennsylvania House of Representatives for the 52nd legislative district. Elected in 2006, she was reelected in 2008, 2010, and 2012.

== Formative years ==
Born in Uniontown, Pennsylvania on March 22, 1949, Kula graduated from Fairchance-George High School in 1967, and was subsequently employed as a secretary with the Fayette Bank and Trust Company.

== Public service career ==
Prior to her legislative career, Kula served as Magisterial District Judge in North Union Township, Pennsylvania from 1991 to 2004. She also served as Court Administrator for the Fayette County Court of Common Pleas.

A member of the Democratic Party who was elected to the Pennsylvania House of Representatives in 2006, Kula represented the 52nd legislative district. She was subsequently reelected in 2008, 2010, and 2012. After successfully winning the primary election for the Pennsylvania State Senate in 2014, she was defeated in the general election on November 4 by Patrick J. Stefano.

=== Committee assignments ===
During her legislative career, Kula served on the following committees:

- Aging and Adult Older Services (2009-2010)
- Agriculture and Rural Affairs (committee member, 2011-2012; democratic vice chair, 2013-2014)
- Appropriations (2009-2010, 2011-2012, 2013–2014)
- Game and Fisheries (2009-2010, 2011-2012, 2013–2014)
- Judiciary (secretary of the committee, 2009-2010; committee member, 2011-2012; democratic secretary, 2013-2014)
- Rules (2013-2014)
- Veterans Affairs and Emergency Preparedness (2009-2010)
