= Bob Mellow =

American politician (born 1942)

President pro tempore of the Pennsylvania Senate
- In office November 18, 1992 – March 15, 1994
- Preceded by: Robert Jubelirer
- Succeeded by: Robert Jubelirer

Democratic Leader of the Pennsylvania Senate
- In office March 15, 1994 – November 30, 2010
- Preceded by: William Lincoln
- Succeeded by: Jay Costa
- In office January 3, 1989 – November 18, 1992
- Preceded by: Edward Zemprelli
- Succeeded by: William Lincoln

Member of the Pennsylvania Senate from the 22nd district
- In office January 5, 1971 – November 30, 2010
- Preceded by: Arthur Piasecki
- Succeeded by: John Blake

Personal details
- Born: December 10, 1942 (age 83) Scranton, Pennsylvania, U.S.
- Party: Democratic
- Education: Lackawanna College Bethel College

Robert J. Mellow is an American politician from Pennsylvania who served as a Democratic member of the Pennsylvania State Senate for the 22nd District from 1971 to 2010. He also served as the Minority Floor Leader from 1994 to 2010 and President pro tempore from 1992 to 1994.

In 2012, he pleaded guilty to federal charges of conspiracy to commit mail fraud and filing a false tax return and was sentenced to 16 months in federal prison.

== Early life and education ==
Mellow was born on December 10, 1942, in Peckville, Pennsylvania, to James and Alice Mellow. Mellow served in the National Guard from 1962 to 1968 and, afterwards, attended Lackawanna Junior College and University of Scranton. He earned his BS in accounting from Bethel College.

== Career ==
He was elected to the State Senate in 1970, defeating Republican incumbent Arthur Piasecki, and was the Democratic caucus leader 1989 through 2010. Mellow represented the 22nd district, which included all of Lackawanna County and neighboring portions of Monroe County and Luzerne County. When the Democrats held the majority in the Senate from 1992 to 1994, Mellow served as the President Pro Tempore.

Mellow is a supporter of efforts to establish a medical school in Scranton. He successfully appropriated $35 million of the estimated $100 million cost in the state capital budget.

In the 1980s, Mellow was under investigation by the FBI for allegedly taking kickback from Mount Airy Lodge, however charges were never filed. He was also known to be good friends with the former owner of Mount Airy Lodge, Louis DeNaples, who had suspected ties to the Bufalino crime family.

As president pro tempore, Mellow was the first lawmaker to authorize the use of television cameras on the state Senate floor to broadcast live Senate sessions.

Mellow indicated interest in running for the Governor's office in 2010. However, he ultimately did not run for governor, and announced his intention not to seek re-election to the Senate in 2010. He was succeeded as the Democratic floor leader by Jay Costa.

=== 2005 Pay Raise ===
Mellow was one of the leaders of the ill-fated legislative pay raise in 2005. He told constituent Bill McIntyre to "Get a life" in an email exchange about the pay raise bill. This phrase became a rallying cry for reformers that year.

== Federal investigation ==
In March 2012, Mellow agreed to plead guilty to charges of conspiracy to commit mail fraud and filing a false income tax return. Mellow formally pleaded guilty on May 9, 2012, to a conspiracy charge related to using Senate staff members to do political work and filing a false tax return.

During the proceedings, U.S. District Judge Joel H. Slomsky thoroughly laid out the charges and the plea agreement for the former senator, making sure Mellow understood the plea agreement and the consequences of it. Asked if he understood that he could receive a maximum prison sentence of five years, Mellow replied "I do". He gave the same answer when asked if he understood he was pleading guilty to a felony and that it would affect his ability to vote and hold a political office. He was sentenced to 16 months in federal prison on November 30, 2012. He forfeited his state-funded pension when he was sent to federal prison after his political corruption and tax evasion convictions. However, his pension was later restored in 2017, in a narrow 6-5 decision.

After serving his sentence, in 2014 all other charges were dismissed.

In 2016, Mellow released a book titled "Used, Abused & Forgotten - Bob Mellow: A Targeted Senator" which chronicled his life in politics and his time in federal prison.

== Notes and references ==
Political offices
Preceded by Robert Jubelirer	President pro tempore of the Pennsylvania Senate; 1992–1994	Succeeded by Robert Jubelirer
Party political offices
Preceded by Edward Zemprelli	Democratic Leader of the Pennsylvania Senate; 1989–1992	Succeeded by William Lincoln
Preceded by William Lincoln	Democratic Leader of the Pennsylvania Senate; 1994–2010	Succeeded by Jay Costa
Pennsylvania State Senate
Preceded by Arthur Piasecki	Member of the Pennsylvania Senate for the 22nd District; 1971–2010	Succeeded by John Blake
