= Rich Kasunic =

American politician (born 1947)

Richard A. Kasunic

Member of the Pennsylvania Senate from the 32nd district
- In office January 3, 1995 – January 2015
- Preceded by: J. William Lincoln
- Succeeded by: Patrick J. Stefano

Member of the Pennsylvania House of Representatives from the 52nd district
- In office January 4, 1983 – November 29, 1994
- Preceded by: Harry Young Cochran
- Succeeded by: James E. Shaner

Personal details
- Born: January 8, 1947 (age 79) Dunbar Township, Pennsylvania
- Party: Democratic
- Education: Youngstown State University

Richard A. "Rich" Kasunic (born January 8, 1947) is a former Democratic member of the Pennsylvania State Senate who represented the 32nd District from 1995 to 2015. He was a member of the Pennsylvania House of Representatives from 1983 through 1994.

Kasunic attended Robert Morris College, receiving an associate degree in business. Two years later, he received a bachelor's degree in the same field upon graduation from Youngstown State University. Prior to running for office, Kasunic ran a small business and was a member of the Army National Guard.
