= Pennsylvania House of Representatives, District 52 =

American legislative district

Pennsylvania's 52nd State House of Representatives district
Representative
Ryan Warner; R–Perryopolis
- Population (2022): 63,125

The 52nd Pennsylvania House of Representatives District is located in southwest Pennsylvania and has been represented by Ryan Warner since 2015.

== District profile ==
The 52nd District is located in Fayette County and includes the following areas:

- Belle Vernon
- Bullskin Township
- Brownsville
- Brownsville
- Connellsville
- Connellsville Township
- Dawson
- Dunbar
- Dunbar Township
- Everson
- Fayette City
- Franklin Township
- Jefferson Township
- Lower Tyrone Township
- Luzerne Township
- Newell
- Ohiopyle
- Perry Township
- Perryopolis
- Redstone Township
- Saltlick Township
- Seven Springs (Fayette County Portion)
- South Connellsville
- Springfield Township
- Stewart Township
- Upper Tyrone Township
- Vanderbilt
- Washington Township

== Representatives ==
Representative	Party	Years	District home	Note
Prior to 1969, seats were apportioned by county.
Russell J. Blair	Democrat	1969 – 1972		
J. William Lincoln	Democrat	1973 – 1978		
Harry Young Cochran	Democrat	1979 – 1982		
Rich Kasunic	Democrat	1983 – 1994		Elected to the Pennsylvania State Senate
James E. Shaner	Democrat	1995 – 2006		
Deberah Kula	Democrat	2007 – 2014	North Union Township	
Ryan Warner	Republican	2015 –	Perryopolis	Incumbent

== Recent election results ==
PA House election, 2024: Pennsylvania House, District 52
Party	Candidate	Votes	%
Republican	Ryan Warner (incumbent)	Unopposed	
Total votes		25,794	100.00
Republican hold			

PA House election, 2022: Pennsylvania House, District 52
Party	Candidate	Votes	%
Republican	Ryan Warner (incumbent)	Unopposed	
Total votes		17,962	100.00
Republican hold			

PA House election, 2020: Pennsylvania House, District 52
Party	Candidate	Votes	%
Republican	Ryan Warner (incumbent)	21,219	70.40
Democratic	Harry Young Cochran	8,923	29.60
Total votes		30,142	100.00
Republican hold			

PA House election, 2018: Pennsylvania House, District 52
Party	Candidate	Votes	%
Republican	Ryan Warner (incumbent)	12,252	61.17
Democratic	Ethan Earl Keedy	7,778	38.83
Total votes		20,030	100.00
Republican hold			

PA House election, 2016: Pennsylvania House, District 52
Party	Candidate	Votes	%
Republican	Ryan Warner (incumbent)	16,578	63.91
Democratic	James Mari	9,360	36.09
Total votes		25,938	100.00
Republican hold			
