= Special circumstances =

The term special circumstances can have various meanings:

- A defense to legal charges
- Special circumstances (criminal law), actions or involvement of an accused deserving a more severe punishment
- "Special Circumstances", episode of The Law (TV series)
- "Special Circumstances” a fictional intelligence and espionage agency in the Culture novels by Iain M. Banks
