= Edward Francis Blewitt =

American politician (1859–1926)

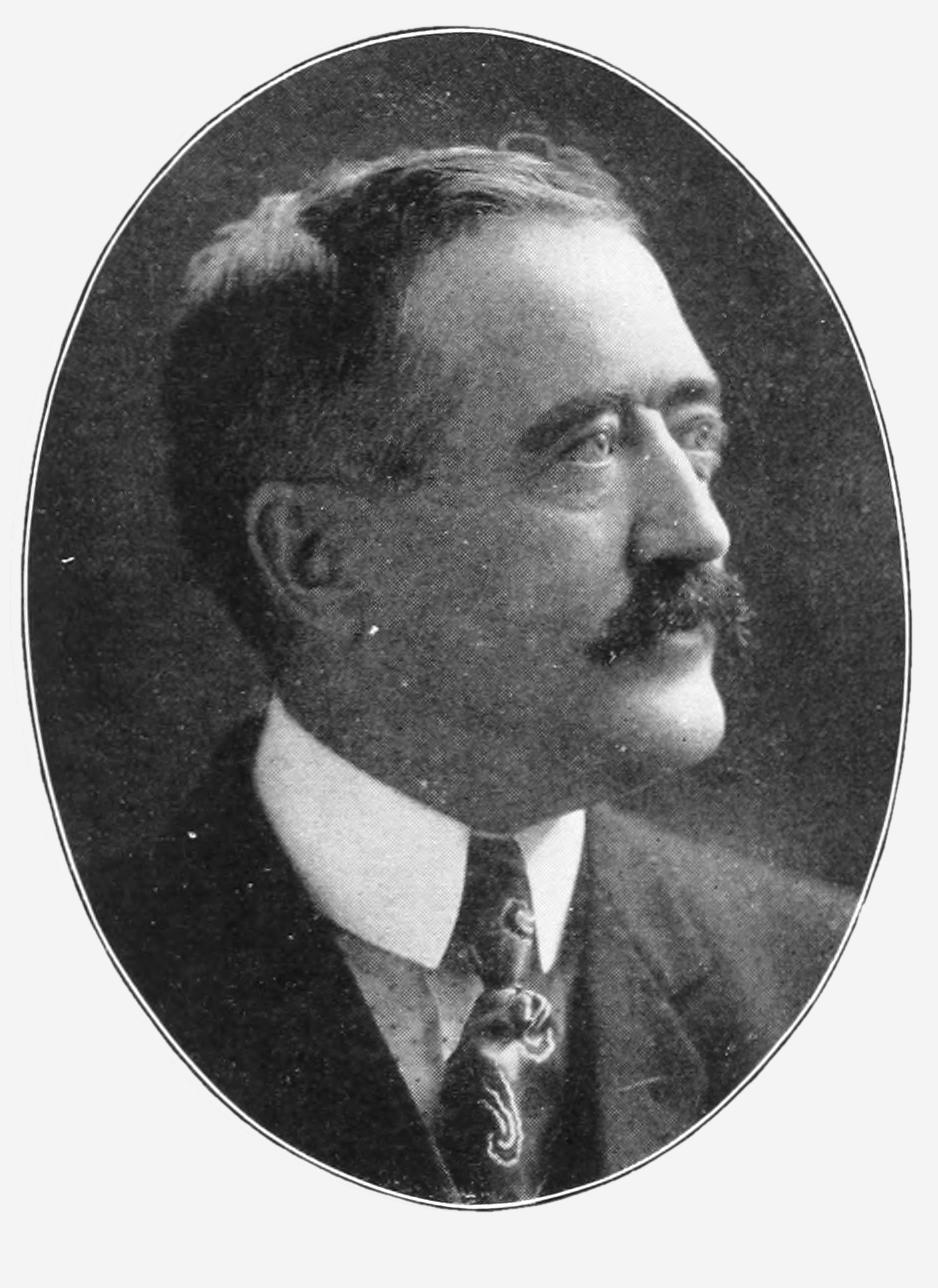
- Blewitt in 1906

Member of the Pennsylvania Senate from the 22nd district
- In office 1907–1910
- Preceded by: Jacob Zern
- Succeeded by: Walter McNichols

Personal details
- Born: January 2, 1859 New Orleans, Louisiana, U.S.
- Died: May 26, 1926 (aged 67) Scranton, Pennsylvania, U.S.
- Party: Democratic
- Spouse(s): Mary Ellen Stanton (m. 1879; died 1887) Mary Ann Blackwell (m. 1891)
- Children: 4
- Relatives: David Blewitt (grandson); Joe Biden (great-grandson)
- Education: Lafayette College (BS)

Edward Francis Blewitt (January 2, 1859 – May 26, 1926) was an American civil engineer, businessman, and politician who served as a Democratic member of the Pennsylvania State Senate for the 22nd district from 1907 to 1910. He was a maternal great-grandfather of Joe Biden, the 46th president of the United States.

== Early life and education ==
Blewitt was born in New Orleans, Louisiana, to Patrick and Catherine (née Scanlon) Blewitt, who were emigrants from Ballina, County Mayo, Ireland. Edward Francis Blewitt's grandfather Edward Blewitt had been an estate agent and construction project manager in Ballina. Blewitt attended Lafayette College, serving as class president, and earned a Bachelor of Science degree in civil engineering in 1879.

== Career ==
Blewitt worked as an engineer in Lehigh Valley, Pennsylvania mining operations. He worked as the City Engineer of Scranton, Pennsylvania, and as chief engineer of the Guadalajara, Mexico sewer and water system from 1883 to 1893. In 1883, he was elected to one term as school controller of Scranton ending in 1884. He worked as state engineer of the State of Jalisco, Mexico from 1900 to 1901.

In 1906, Blewitt was elected as a member of the Pennsylvania Senate for the 22nd district from 1907 to 1910. Blewitt was the first Irish-Catholic to serve in the Pennsylvania General Assembly.

In 1903, he founded the Edward F. Gold Mining Company, a silver and gold mining operation in Montana.

Blewitt was the co-founder of the Friendly Sons of St. Patrick in Scranton in 1908 and was a member of the Benevolent and Protective Order of Elks.

== Personal life ==
He married Mary Ellen Stanton in 1879. They had four children together: Gertrude, Patrick, Arthur, and Geraldine. From this marriage (through their daughter Geraldine), Blewitt is the matrilineal great-grandfather of Joe Biden, the 46th president of the United States. Through Blewitt's son Patrick, he is the grandfather of Ghostbusters editor David Blewitt. His wife died in 1887, and in 1891 Blewitt was remarried to Mary Ann Blackwell.

Blewitt died on May 26, 1926.

== See also ==
- Family of Joe Biden

Pennsylvania State Senate
Preceded by Jacob Zern	Member of the Pennsylvania State Senate from the 22nd district 1907–1910	Succeeded by Walter McNichols
