= The Competition (1980 film) =

1980 film directed by Joel Oliansky

- Directed by: Joel Oliansky
- Screenplay by: Joel Oliansky
- Story by: Joel Oliansky; William Sackheim
- Produced by: William Sackheim
- Starring: Richard Dreyfuss; Amy Irving; Lee Remick; Sam Wanamaker
- Cinematography: Richard H. Kline
- Edited by: David Blewitt
- Music by: Lalo Schifrin
- Color process: Metrocolor
- Production company: Rastar Films
- Distributed by: Columbia Pictures
- Release date: December 3, 1980
- Running time: 126 minutes
- Country: United States
- Language: English
- Budget: $10.1 million
- Box office: $14.3 million

The Competition is a 1980 American drama musical film starring Richard Dreyfuss, Amy Irving, and Lee Remick, and written and directed by Joel Oliansky.

== Plot ==
Paul Dietrich, a gifted but disillusioned classical pianist, is nearly 30 years old. He has never won a major piano competition and will soon be past the age limit to compete. Paul has accepted a job as a music teacher at a college-preparatory school in his hometown of Chicago, needing to help his mother and ailing father. He decides to compete one final time at an international piano competition in San Francisco, though it could cost him the job.

The competition for a financial grant and two years of concert engagements pits the intense and arrogant Paul against a select group of talented artists. He advances to the final round of six, which includes brash New Yorker Jerry DiSalvo, who can only play one concerto; Michael Humphries; Canadian pianist Mark Landau; and a meek Kazakh girl, Tatiana Baronova.

Another contestant, Heidi Joan Schoonover, is a confident 23-year-old from Massachusetts,who was romantically attracted to Paul after meeting him at an earlier music festival. Heidi's esteemed music teacher, Greta Vandemann, advises her to avoid letting personal matters hinder her concentration. Heidi is rebuffed by Paul, who also wants to avoid any distraction.

Before the finals, Tatiana's music teacher defects, causing the emotionally fragile Tatiana to have a nervous breakdown and the competition to be postponed for a week. Meanwhile, Paul's mother wants him to withdraw from the competition and focus on the teaching job, as his father is very ill and should no longer be working to support Paul's musical ambitions. Paul stays in the competition but feels guilty. He lashes out at Heidi during a meeting with the other contestants and the arrogant conductor.

Paul later apologizes to Heidi, and they have a coffee date. Afterwards, at his hotel room, he pours his heart out to her about his family situation. Greta worries that Heidi and Paul's relationship may cost Heidi her competitive edge.

The competition is rescheduled. A reception for the contestants unexpectedly turns into a press conference for Tatiana, who is returning to the competition after meeting with her teacher. Paul is infuriated, believing sympathy for Tatiana is making her the favorite to win the competition. He criticizes Heidi for defending Tatiana and accuses her of not taking the competition seriously. Heidi realizes how much winning means to Paul and wants to drop out. Greta angrily chastises Paul, blaming him for exploiting Heidi's guilt over competing against him.

Paul tells Heidi that he loves her and persuades her to stay in the competition. Partway through her performance, Heidi's piano develops a technical problem, forcing her to stop. Rather than folding under pressure, Heidi demands to play a different, more difficult and dramatic concerto, requiring a larger orchestra. She performs magnificently and wins the competition; Paul finishes in second place.

Heidi is ecstatic because she and Paul had agreed to form a partnership, combining their talents and resources to help one another, no matter who won. To her dismay, Paul is upset to realize that she is a more proficient player. He tells her he is unable to honor their partnership and leaves. However, Paul finally arrives at the celebration party following the competition, ready to take part in Heidi's victory and to be in her life.

== Cast ==
- Richard Dreyfuss as Paul Dietrich
- Amy Irving as Heidi Joan Schoonover
- Lee Remick as Greta Vandemann
- Sam Wanamaker as Andrew Erskine
- Joseph Cali as Jerry DiSalvo
- Ty Henderson as Michael Humphries
- Vicki Kriegler as Tatiana Baronova
- Adam Stern as Mark Landau
- Bea Silvern as Madame Gorshev
- Gloria Stroock as Mrs. Dietrich
- Philip Sterling as Mr. Dietrich
- Priscilla Pointer as Mrs. Donellan
- James B. Sikking as Brudenell
- Delia Salvi as Mrs. DiSalvo

== Music ==
- The Los Angeles Philharmonic Orchestra
  Conducted by Lalo Schifrin
- Alberto Ginastera, Piano Sonata No. 1
  Eduardo Delgado, Pianist
- Johannes Brahms, Piano Concerto No. 1
  Ralph Grierson, Pianist
- Frédéric Chopin, Piano Concerto in E Minor
  Lincoln Mayorga, Pianist
- Sergei Prokofiev, Piano Concerto No. 3 in C Major
  Daniel Pollack, Pianist
- Ludwig van Beethoven, Piano Concerto No. 5
  Chester B. Swiatkowski, Pianist
- "People Alone"
  Music by Lalo Schifrin
  Lyrics by Wilbur Jennings
  Sung by Randy Crawford

== Awards and nominations ==
Award	Category	Recipient	Result
Academy Awards	Best Film Editing	David Blewitt	Nominated
Academy Awards	Best Original Song	"People Alone"; Music by Lalo Schifrin; Lyrics by Will Jennings	Nominated
Golden Globe Awards	Best Original Score	Lalo Schifrin	Nominated
Golden Raspberry Awards	Worst Actor	Richard Dreyfuss	Nominated
Stinkers Bad Movie Awards	Worst On-Screen Couple	Richard Dreyfuss and Amy Irving	Nominated
