= Walter McNichols =

American politician and businessman

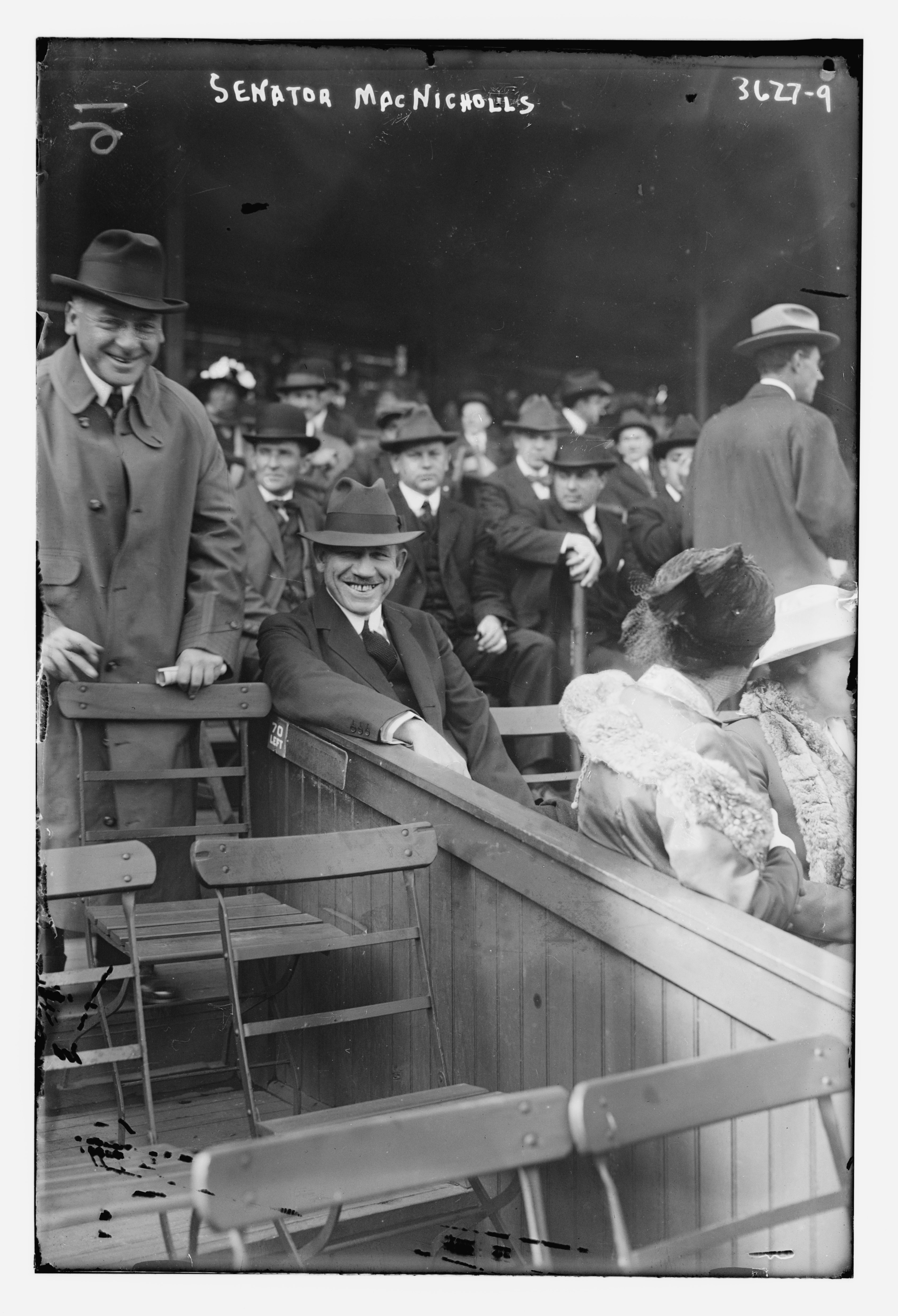

Member of the Pennsylvania Senate from the 22nd district
- In office 1911–1914
- Preceded by: Edward Francis Blewitt
- Succeeded by: William M. Lynch

Personal details
- Born: January 10, 1863 Scranton, Pennsylvania
- Died: January 11, 1924 (aged 61) Scranton, Pennsylvania
- Party: Republican

Military service
- Branch/service: Pennsylvania National Guard

Walter McNichols (January 10, 1863 – January 11, 1924) was an American politician and businessman who served as a member of the Pennsylvania State Senate from 1911 to 1914.

== Background ==
McNichols was born in Scranton, Pennsylvania, in 1863. He attended local public schools.

McNichols worked at his father's grocery story and for the United States Postal Service. He later served in the Pennsylvania National Guard. McNichols established the Retail Merchants Association and operated his father's store. He was elected to the Pennsylvania State Senate for the 22nd district in November 1910, succeeding Edward Francis Blewitt. McNichols served until 1914, and was defeated for re-election by William M. Lynch. McNichols later served as acting Commissioner of the Pennsylvania Department of Labor and Industry.

He died of a heart attack on January 11, 1924.
