= Jacques Renoir =

French photographer and cinematographer (1942–2024)

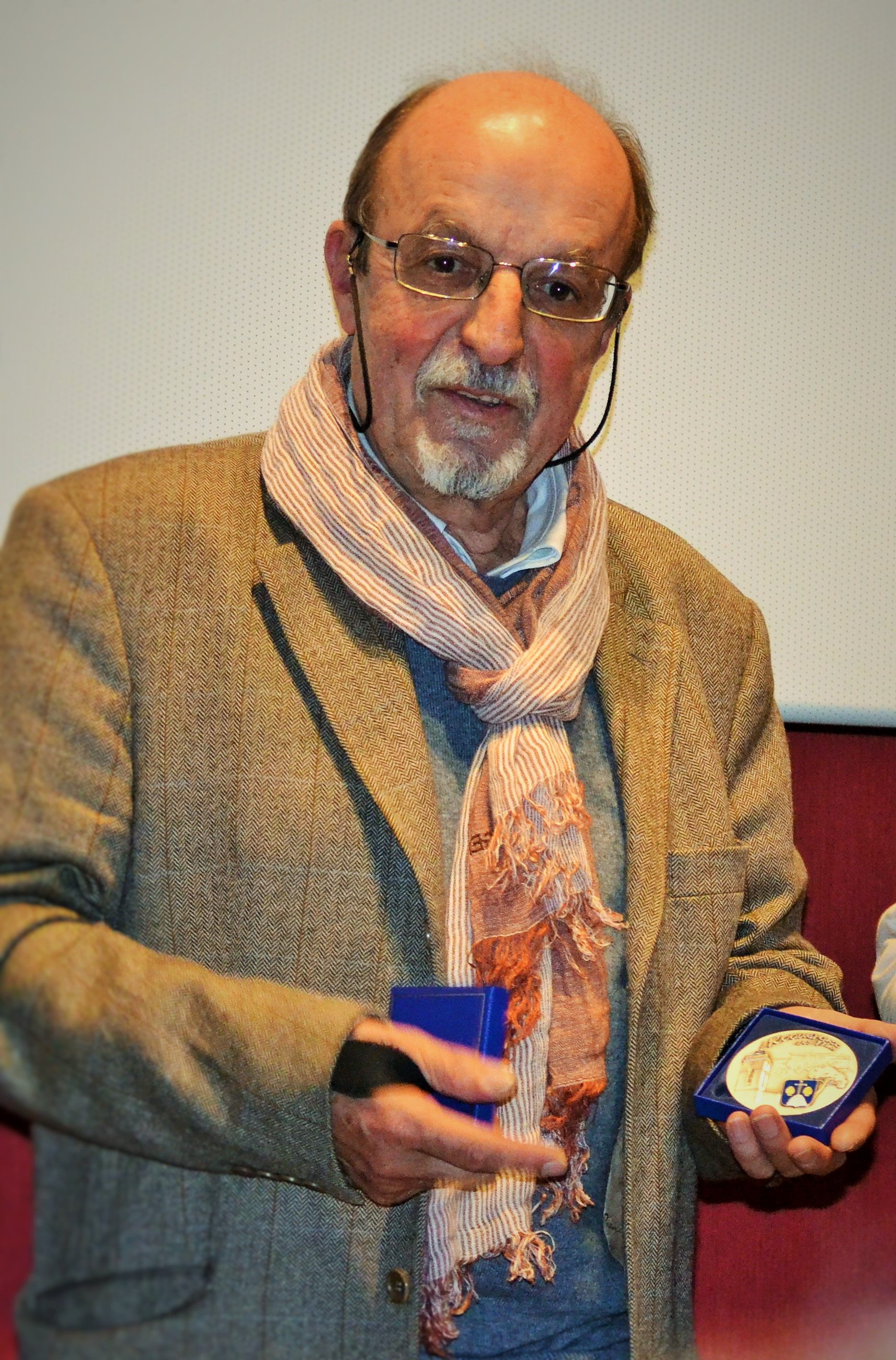
- Renoir in 2011
- Born: 30 December 1942
- Died: 7 November 2024 (aged 81); Nice, France
- Education: École nationale supérieure Louis-Lumière
- Occupations: Photographer; Cinematographer

Jacques Renoir (30 December 1942 – 7 November 2024) was a French photographer and cinematographer.

== Life and career ==
Born on 30 December 1942, Renoir was the great-grandson of painter Pierre-Auguste Renoir and model Aline Charigot, the grandson of actor Pierre Renoir, the son of Claude Renoir, and the grand-nephew of director Jean Renoir. He was also the half-brother of actress Sophie Renoir. A graduate of the École nationale supérieure Louis-Lumière, he worked as an assistant film director alongside Roger Vadim, Claude Sautet, and Pierre Granier-Deferre. He also took part in voyages on the Calypso with Jacques Cousteau. As a photographer, he produced several reports for television.

Renoir died in Nice on 7 November 2024, at the age of 81.

== Filmography ==
- À l'ombre d'un été (1976)
- Les Malheurs d'Octavie (1980)
- Polar (1984)
- Le Déclic (1985)

== Expositions ==
- Beddington Fine Art (Bargemon)
- Zeit-foto salon (Tokyo)
- Chateau musée (Cagnes-sur-Mer)
- Abbey of St. Philibert (Tournus)

== Book ==
- Le Tableau amoureux
