= Joel Oliansky =

American screenwriter

Joel Oliansky (October 11, 1935 – July 29, 2002) an Emmy-winning director and screenwriter, was best known for the screenplay of Bird (the 1988 biographic film about Charlie Parker), as well as writing and directing episodes of TV series including The Law, and Kojak.

== Early life ==
Oliansky was born in Brooklyn, New York and attended Hofstra University, graduating in 1959. In his last year, he wrote the book for the Hofstra University Kaleidoscopians' musical Inertia which featured music by Steve Lawrence, lyrics by Francis Ford Coppola and starred fellow-student Lainie Kazan; a drama scholarship at Hofstra is named in his memory. He pursued a master's degree at Yale, during which course his 1962 play Here Comes Santa Claus was written and produced. He remained as playwright-in-residence at Yale until 1964, and directed two of the four plays comprising the initial season of the Hartford Stage Company, as well. During this period he also wrote Shame, Shame On the Johnson Boys (published in 1966), a humorous novel about the folk-singing scene.

== Hollywood ==
Late in 1964, at the urging of fellow Hofstra alumnus Coppola he moved to California to work as a screenwriter at Seven Arts. Although early in his L.A. stay he was largely involved in finishing his novel, he was able to establish industry connections. By 1967 he was being credited as a writer and director for the Daniel Boone TV series. He also wrote screenplays for films, including 1968's Counterpoint and The Todd Killings in 1971. He continued to work in both film and television, directing the 1990 TV movie In Defense of a Married Man, and writing his final work in 1996, the poorly-received: Abducted: A Father's Love.

== Recognition ==
In 1971, Oliansky won the Emmy Award for Outstanding Writing Achievement in Drama, won the Writers Guild Award (Long Form: Multi-part) for the 1981 series Masada, and was nominated for these awards several other times. He wrote and directed the Oscar-nominated 1980 film The Competition, and wrote the screenplay for Bird which was directed by Clint Eastwood and won an Oscar, and a Golden Globe.

== Personal life ==
He married Patricia Godfrey the year after graduating from Hofstra; they were later divorced. He died from complications of Guillain–Barré syndrome, leaving two adult children. He is buried in the Hollywood Forever Cemetery.
