= J. William Lincoln =

American politician (born 1940)

Member of the Pennsylvania Senate from the 32nd district
- In office January 2, 1979 – November 30, 1994
- Preceded by: William Duffield
- Succeeded by: Rich Kasunic

Chair of the Pennsylvania Democratic Party
- In office October 1, 1991 – June 17, 1994
- Preceded by: Larry Yatch
- Succeeded by: Linda Rhodes

Democratic Leader of the Pennsylvania Senate
- In office November 18, 1992 – March 15, 1994
- Preceded by: Bob Mellow
- Succeeded by: Bob Mellow

Democratic Whip of the Pennsylvania Senate
- In office January 1, 1985 – November 18, 1992
- Preceded by: Eugene Scanlon
- Succeeded by: Leonard Bodack

Member of the Pennsylvania House of Representatives from the 52nd district
- In office January 2, 1973 – November 30, 1978
- Preceded by: Russell Blair
- Succeeded by: Harry Young Cochran

Personal details
- Born: October 27, 1940 (age 85) Lemont Furnace, Pennsylvania
- Party: Democratic

J. William Lincoln (born October 27, 1940) is a former member of the Pennsylvania State Senate, serving from 1979 to 1994.
