= Stanford Tischler =

American film producer (1921–2014)

- Born: December 25, 1921; Wilkes-Barre, Pennsylvania
- Died: January 15, 2014 (aged 92)
- Occupations: film editor, producer

Stanford Tischler (December 25, 1921, in Wilkes-Barre, Pennsylvania – January 15, 2014) was an American film editor and producer.

His first recorded credit as an editor was for The Bigamist (1953), but he was also the sound effects editor for the Frank Capra film It's a Wonderful Life (1946). Tischler won an Emmy Award in 1976 for his work on M*A*S*H, for which he edited and co-produced 130 episodes and was also nominated for a further eight Emmys, also for M*A*S*H. He also won at least two Eddie Awards, in 1974 and 1975, presented by the American Cinema Editors honorary society for his work on M*A*S*H.

Tischler died on January 15, 2014. He was 92.

== See also ==
- Larry Gelbart
