= James Galloway (film editor) =

- Born: February 16, 1928
- Died: November 13, 1996 (aged 68)
- Occupation: film editor
- Years active: 1969–1995

James Galloway (February 16, 1928 – November 13, 1996) was a film editor who was nominated at the 46th Academy Awards. He was nominated for the film Jonathan Livingston Seagull. This was in the category of Best Film Editing.

He also has been nominated for multiple Emmy awards for made for TV films. He also contributed to TV shows like Remington Steele. Galloway died in 1996.

== Partial filmography ==
- Annie: A Royal Adventure! (1995)
- Queen (1993)
- Switched at Birth (1991)
- The Taking of Flight 847: The Uli Derickson Story (1988)
- Jonathan Livingston Seagull (1973)
- Gargoyles (1972)
