= American Cinema Editors Award for Best Edited Feature Film =

Annual US film award

- Awarded for: Best Editing for a Feature Film
- Country: United States
- Presented by: American Cinema Editors (ACE)
- Website: americancinemaeditors.org

The American Cinema Editors Award for Best Edited Feature Film is one of the first annual awards given by the American Cinema Editors, awarded to what members of the American Cinema Editors Guild deem as the best edited film for a given year. It was split into two categories – Best Edited Comedy or Musical Film and Best Edited Dramatic Film – in 2000.

== Winners and nominees ==
=== 1960s ===
Best Edited Feature Film

Year	Film	Editor(s)
1961	The Parent Trap	Philip W. Anderson
1961	Fanny	William H. Reynolds
1961	The Hustler	Dede Allen
1961	Judgment at Nuremberg	Frederic Knudtson
1961	Pocketful of Miracles	Frank P. Keller
1962	The Longest Day	Samuel E. Beetley
1962	Lawrence of Arabia	Anne V. Coates
1962	Mutiny on the Bounty	John McSweeney Jr.
1962	To Kill a Mockingbird	Aaron Stell
1962	The Wonderful World of the Brothers Grimm	Walter Thompson
1963	How the West Was Won	Harold F. Kress
1963	Cleopatra	Dorothy Spencer
1963	Hud	Frank Bracht
1963	It's a Mad, Mad, Mad, Mad World	Frederic Knudtson, Robert C. Jones, and Gene Fowler Jr.
1963	Tom Jones	Antony Gibbs
1964	Mary Poppins	Cotton Warburton
1964	Becket	Anne V. Coates
1964	My Fair Lady	William H. Ziegler
1964	The Unsinkable Molly Brown	Fredric Steinkamp
1964	What a Way to Go!	Marjorie Fowler
1965	The Sound of Music	William H. Reynolds
1965	Dear Brigitte	Marjorie Fowler
1965	The Flight of the Phoenix	Michael Luciano
1965	A Thousand Clowns	Ralph Rosenblum
1965	Tokyo Olympiad	Richard L. Van Enger
1966 (Note: Fantastic Voyage and Grand Prix were both given the "Best Edited Feature Film" award.)	Fantastic Voyage (TIE)	William B. Murphy
1966	Grand Prix (TIE)	Fredric Steinkamp (supervising editor), Henry Berman, Stu Linder, and Frank Santillo
1966	The Professionals	Peter Zinner
1966	The Sand Pebbles	William H. Reynolds
1966	Who's Afraid of Virginia Woolf?	Sam O'Steen
1967	The Dirty Dozen	Michael Luciano
1967	Beach Red	Frank P. Keller
1967	Bonnie and Clyde	Dede Allen
1967	Doctor Dolittle	Samuel E. Beetley and Marjorie Fowler
1967	In the Heat of the Night	Hal Ashby
1967	Guess Who's Coming to Dinner	Robert C. Jones
1968	Bullitt	Frank P. Keller
1968	The Boston Strangler	Marion Rothman
1968	Funny Girl	William Sands, Robert Swink, and Maury Winetrobe
1968	The Odd Couple	Frank Bracht
1968	Oliver!	Ralph Kemplen
1969 (Note: Hello, Dolly! and True Grit were both given the "Best Edited Feature Film" award.)	Hello, Dolly! (TIE)	William H. Reynolds
1969	True Grit (TIE)	Warren Low
1969	Anne of the Thousand Days	Richard Marden
1969	Butch Cassidy and the Sundance Kid	John C. Howard and Richard C. Meyer
1969	The Secret of Santa Vittoria	Earle Herdan and William A. Lyon

=== 1970s ===
Year	Film	Editor(s)
1970	Patton	Hugh S. Fowler
1970	Airport	Stuart Gilmore
1970	The Great White Hope	William H. Reynolds
1970	M*A*S*H	Danford B. Greene
1970	Tora! Tora! Tora!	Inoue Chikaya, Pembroke J. Herring, and James E. Newcom
1971	Summer of '42	Folmar Blangsted
1971	The African Elephant	Alan Jaggs
1971	Fiddler on the Roof	Antony Gibbs and Robert Lawrence
1971	The French Connection	Gerald B. Greenberg
1971	Kotch	Ralph E. Winters
1971	Willard	Warren Low
1972	Cabaret	David Bretherton
1972	The Godfather	Peter Zinner
1972	The Poseidon Adventure	Harold F. Kress
1973	The Sting	William H. Reynolds
1973	The Day of the Jackal	Ralph Kemplen
1973	Jonathan Livingston Seagull	Frank P. Keller and James Galloway
1974	The Longest Yard	Michael Luciano
1974	Earthquake	Dorothy Spencer
1974	The Towering Inferno	Harold F. Kress and Carl Kress
1975	Jaws	Verna Fields
1975	The Hindenburg	Donn Cambern
1975	One Flew Over the Cuckoo's Nest	Richard Chew, Lynzee Klingman, and Sheldon Kahn
1976	Rocky	Richard Halsey and Scott Conrad
1976	All the President's Men	Robert L. Wolfe
1976	Network	Alan Heim
1977	The Turning Point	William H. Reynolds
1977	Close Encounters of the Third Kind	Michael Kahn
1977	Star Wars	Paul Hirsch, Marcia Lucas, and Richard Chew
1978	The Deer Hunter	Peter Zinner
1978	Hooper	Donn Cambern
1978	Superman	Stuart Baird
1979	All That Jazz	Alan Heim
1979	Apocalypse Now	Richard Marks, Walter Murch, Gerald B. Greenberg, and Lisa Fruchtman
1979	The Black Stallion	Robert Dalva

=== 1980s ===
Year	Film	Editor(s)
1980	Raging Bull	Thelma Schoonmaker
1980	Coal Miner's Daughter	Arthur Schmidt
1980	Fame	Gerry Hambling
1981	Raiders of the Lost Ark	Michael Kahn
1981	On Golden Pond	Robert L. Wolfe
1981	Reds	Dede Allen and Craig McKay
1982	Gandhi	John Bloom
1982	E.T. the Extra-Terrestrial	Carol Littleton
1982	Tootsie	Fredric Steinkamp and William Steinkamp
1983	WarGames	Tom Rolf
1983	Flashdance	Bud S. Smith and Walt Mulconery
1983	The Right Stuff	Glenn Farr, Lisa Fruchtman, Stephen A. Rotter, Douglas Stewart, and Tom Rolf
1984	Amadeus	Nena Danevic and Michael Chandley
1984	The Killing Fields	Jim Clark
1984	Romancing the Stone	Donn Cambern and Frank Morriss
1985	Witness	Thom Noble
1985	Out of Africa	Fredric Steinkamp, William Steinkamp, Pembroke J. Herring, and Sheldon Kahn
1985	Runaway Train	Henry Richardson
1986	Platoon	Claire Simpson
1986	Hoosiers	C. Timothy O'Meara
1986	The Mission	Jim Clark
1987	The Last Emperor	Gabriella Cristiani
1987	Broadcast News	Richard Marks
1987	Fatal Attraction	Michael Kahn and Peter E. Berger
1988	Mississippi Burning (TIE)	Gerry Hambling
1988	Rain Man (TIE)	Stu Linder
1988	Who Framed Roger Rabbit	Arthur Schmidt
1989	Glory	Steven Rosenblum
1989	Born on the Fourth of July	David Brenner and Joe Hutshing
1989	Field of Dreams	Ian Crafford

=== 1990s ===
Year	Film	Editor(s)
1990	Dances with Wolves	Neil Travis
1990	Ghost	Walter Murch
1990	Goodfellas	Thelma Schoonmaker
1991	JFK	Joe Hutshing and Pietro Scalia
1991	The Silence of the Lambs	Craig McKay
1991	Terminator 2: Judgment Day	Conrad Buff IV, Mark Goldblatt, and Richard A. Harris
1992	Unforgiven	Joel Cox
1992	A Few Good Men	Robert Leighton
1992	The Last of the Mohicans	Dov Hoenig and Arthur Schmidt
1992	The Player	Geraldine Peroni
1992	Scent of a Woman	William Steinkamp, Michael Tronick, and Harvey Rosenstock
1993	Schindler's List	Michael Kahn
1993	The Fugitive	Dennis Virkler, David Finfer, Dean Goodhill, Don Brochu, Richard Nord, and Dov Hoenig
1993	In the Line of Fire	Anne V. Coates
1993	In the Name of the Father	Gerry Hambling
1993	The Piano	Veronika Jenet
1994	Forrest Gump	Arthur Schmidt
1994	Pulp Fiction	Sally Menke
1994	The Shawshank Redemption	Richard Francis-Bruce
1994	Speed	John Wright
1994	True Lies	Conrad Buff IV, Mark Goldblatt, and Richard A. Harris
1995	Braveheart	Steven Rosenblum
1995	Apollo 13	Daniel P. Hanley and Mike Hill
1995	Casino	Thelma Schoonmaker
1995	Crimson Tide	Chris Lebenzon
1995	The Usual Suspects	John Ottman
1996	The English Patient	Walter Murch
1996	Evita	Gerry Hambling
1996	Fargo	Roderick Jaynes
1996	The Rock	Richard Francis-Bruce
1996	Shine	Pip Karmel
1997	Titanic	Conrad Buff IV, James Cameron, and Richard A. Harris
1997	Air Force One	Richard Francis-Bruce
1997	As Good as It Gets	Richard Marks
1997	Good Will Hunting	Pietro Scalia
1997	L.A. Confidential	Peter Honess
1998	Saving Private Ryan	Michael Kahn
1998	The Horse Whisperer	Hank Corwin, Freeman Davies, and Tom Rolf
1998	Out of Sight	Anne V. Coates
1998	Shakespeare in Love	David Gamble
1998	The Thin Red Line	Billy Weber, Leslie Jones, and Saar Klein
