= American Cinema Editors Awards 1983 =

33rd ACE Eddie Awards
- Presented by: American Cinema Editors
- Date: March 1983

Highlights
- Best Film: Gandhi

The 33rd American Cinema Editors Awards, which were presented in March 1983, honored the best editors in films and television. The keynote speaker was film director Daniel Petrie.

== Winners and nominees ==
=== Film ===
Best Edited Feature Film	Best Edited Documentary
Gandhi – John Bloom; E.T. the Extra-Terrestrial – Carol Littleton; Tootsie – Fredric Steinkamp and William Steinkamp	The Thames – Peter C. Johnson; Burden of Dreams – Maureen Gosling

=== Television ===
Best Edited Episode from a Television Series
Fame: "Passing Grade" – Michael A. Hoey; Hill Street Blues: "Phantom of the Hill" – Ray Daniels; Hill Street Blues: "World According to Freedom" – David Rosenbloom; Lou Grant: "Recovery" – James Galloway; It's a Man's World: "The Beavers and the Otters" – Danford B. Greene
Best Edited Television Special	Best Edited from a Television Mini-Series
A Piano for Mrs. Cimino – Rita Roland; Mae West – George Jay Nicholson; Missing Children: A Mother's Story – Byron 'Buzz' Brandt	The Blue and the Gray: "Part I" – Fred A. Chulack and Bud Friedgen; Marco Polo: "Part III" – John A. Martinelli; A Woman Called Golda: "Part I" – Robert F. Shugrue
