= List of film director and editor collaborations =

This list includes longstanding, notable collaborations of directors and editors. The list's importance is that directors and editors typically work together on the editing of a film, which is the ultimate step of filmmaking during which the dozens or hundreds of hours of raw film footage are pruned and woven into the final film. Film critic Walter Kerr has argued that editing is comparable in its importance to directing itself, and should be credited as such; he wrote "At the very least, it seems to me, the editor's credit should be rescued from its place near the bottom of the list, an area we may call Oblivion. And I don't mean the editor should be given a mere half-a-leg up, nudged one inch higher in the Pantheon of creative people who do things. The best he ever gets now is fourth or fifth spot, somewhere after the principal photographer and two or three screenwriters. Second position is where he belongs, and no lower, if we're still going to hold him to also-ran status." Quentin Tarantino has been quoted as saying, "The best collaborations are the director-editor teams, where they can finish each other's sentences," and that his own editor, Sally Menke, was his "only, truly genuine collaborator."

Crediting the editing of a film is made more difficult by the fact that the relative contributions of the director and the editor vary enormously. At one extreme lies the old Hollywood studio system; as described by Lizzie Francke, this was the "period when the editor was often left to his or her own devices in the cutting room. The pressures of production turn-over during the hey-day of the studio system often meant that the director could not be around to supervise since they were on to their next production." Editors such as Margaret Booth (Metro-Goldwyn-Mayer Studios) and Barbara McLean (20th Century Fox) worked nearly autonomously. At the other extreme lie "auteur" directors who personally edit their own films. Akira Kurosawa both directed and edited many of his best-known films (cf. Seven Samurai (1954), Kagemusha (1980)); Hiroshi Nezu, Kurosawa's production chief, was quoted as saying, "Among ourselves we think that he is Toho’s best director, that he is Japan’s best scenarist, and that he is the best editor in the world."

== Criteria for listings ==
The following list of notable director and editor collaborations does not attempt to parse the relative contributions of the individuals. The feature film collaborations on this list have each extended over a decade or more, and have produced at least one film nominated for an Academy Award or BAFTA Award in one or more of the following categories: best film; best directing; or best editing. One such film is noted for each collaboration. The restriction to Oscar-nominated or BAFTA-nominated films does exclude most directors and editors whose films are not in English. The dates listed for each collaboration are based on searches of the Internet Movie Database.

== 35 years and more ==
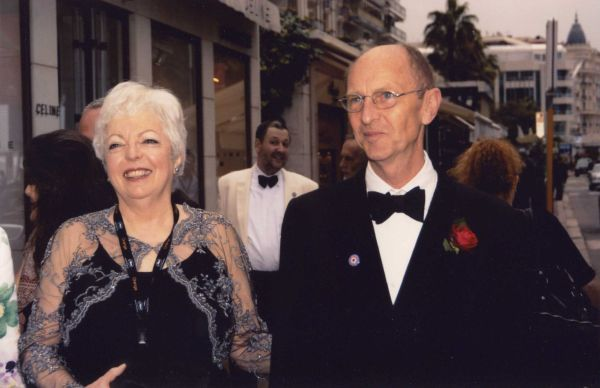
Thelma Schoonmaker and Columba Powell at the Cannes Film Festival (2009). Schoonmaker is among the deans of film editing; Columba Powell is the son of Michael Powell, a prominent film director to whom Schoonmaker was married until his death in 1990.

- Pedro Almodóvar: José Salcedo (1980–2016), Talk to Her (2002).
- Gillian Armstrong: Nicholas Beauman (1977–present), Women He's Undressed (2015).
- Charles Band: Ted Nicolaou (1983–present), Death Streamer (2024).
- Francis Ford Coppola: Walter Murch (1974–2009), Apocalypse Now (1979).
- Francis Ford Coppola: Robert Schafer (1984–present), Twixt (2011).
- David Cronenberg: Ronald Sanders (1979–2014), Eastern Promises (2007).
- Cecil B. DeMille: Anne Bauchens (1918–1956), The Ten Commandments (1956).
- Brian De Palma: Bill Pankow (1970–present), Femme Fatale (2002).
- Clint Eastwood: Joel Cox (1977–present), Million Dollar Baby (2004).
- Roman Polanski: Hervé de Luze (1986–present), The Pianist (2002).
- Dino Risi: Alberto Gallitti (1959–1996), Giovani e belli (1996).
- Martin Scorsese: Thelma Schoonmaker (1967–present), The Departed (2006).
- Ridley Scott: Claire Simpson (1987–present), Gladiator II (2024).
- Steven Spielberg: Michael Kahn (1977–present), Schindler's List (1993).

== 30–34 years ==
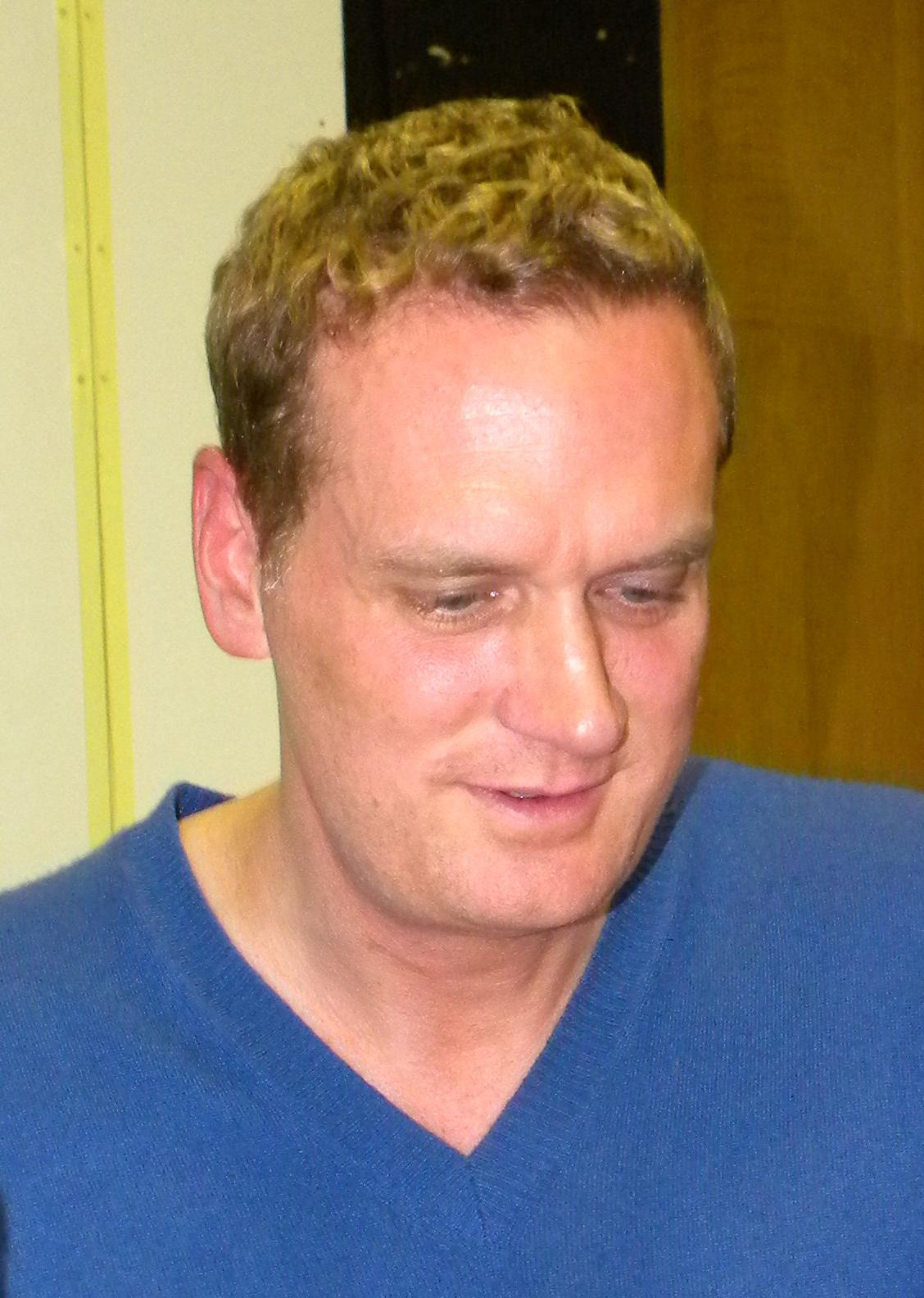
John Ottman has had a long collaboration with director Bryan Singer, and is also noted for his musical scoring of many films and television programs.

- John Badham: Frank Morriss (1974–2004), Blue Thunder (1983).
- Bob Clark: Stan Cole (1974–2005), The Karate Dog (2005).
- Bill Condon: Virginia Katz (1987–present), Dreamgirls (2006).
- Francis Ford Coppola: Glen Scantlebury (1984–present), Bram Stoker's Dracula (1992).
- Martha Coolidge: Richard Chew (1985–present), I'll Find You (2019).
- Brian De Palma: Paul Hirsch (1970–2000), Mission to Mars (2000).
- Stephen Frears: Mick Audsley (1982–2013), Dangerous Liaisons (1988).
- Ron Howard: Daniel P. Hanley (1982–2016) and Mike Hill (1982–2015), A Beautiful Mind (2001).
- Lawrence Kasdan: Carol Littleton (1981–2012), The Accidental Tourist (1988).
- Spike Lee: Barry Alexander Brown (1988–present), BlacKkKlansman (2018).
- Mike Leigh: Jon Gregory (1988–2018), Secrets & Lies (1996).
- Terrence Malick: Billy Weber (1978–2011), The Thin Red Line (1998).
- Otto Preminger: Louis Loeffler (1943–1967), The Cardinal (1963).
- Sam Raimi: Bob Murawski (1992–present), Doctor Strange in the Multiverse of Madness (2022).
- Ivan Reitman: Sheldon Kahn (1984–2014), Draft Day (2014).
- Andy Sidaris: Craig Stewart (1973–1994), The Dallas Connection (1994).
- Bryan Singer: John Ottman (1988–present), Bohemian Rhapsody (2018).

== 25–29 years ==
- Josh Becker: Kaye Davis (1991–present), Morning, Noon & Night (2018).
- Bruce Beresford: Mark Warner (1989–present), Driving Miss Daisy (1989).
- Brad Bird: Darren T. Holmes (1999–present), Ray Gunn (2026).
- James L. Brooks: Richard Marks (1983–2010), As Good as It Gets (1997).
- Tim Burton: Chris Lebenzon (1992–2019), Big Fish (2003).
- James Cameron: (1997–present), Titanic (1997).
- Francis Ford Coppola: Barry Malkin (1969–1997), The Godfather Part III (1990).
- Costa-Gavras: Françoise Bonnot (1969–1997), Z (1969).
- Joe Dante: Marshall Harvey (1987–2014), Burying the Ex (2014).
- Jacques Deray: Henri Lanoe (1966–1993), Un crime (1993).
- John Ford: Otho Lovering (1939–1966), Stagecoach (1939).
- John Ford: Jack Murray (1936–1961), The Quiet Man (1952).
- Antoine Fuqua: Conrad Buff IV (2001–present), Michael (2026).
- John D. Hancock: Dennis H. O'Connor (1987–2015), Steal the Sky (1988).
- Walter Hill: Freeman A. Davies (1979–2006), Broken Trail (2006).
- Arthur Hiller: Robert C. Jones (1967–1992), Love Story (1970).
- Ang Lee: Tim Squyres (1993–present), Crouching Tiger, Hidden Dragon (2000).
- Richard Lester: John Victor Smith (1965–1991), The Three Musketeers (1973).
- Joseph Losey: Reginald Beck (1958–1985), The Go-Between (1970).
- Delbert Mann: Ralph E. Winters (1967–1994), Lily in Winter (1994).
- Paul Mazursky: Stuart H. Pappe (1969–1998), Winchell (1998).
- Paul Mazursky: Richard Halsey (1974–2003), Coast to Coast (2003).
- Sean McNamara : Gregory Hobson (1998–present), Bau: Artist at War (2024).
- George Miller: Margaret Sixel (1998–present), Mad Max: Fury Road (2015).
- Hayao Miyazaki: Takeshi Seyama (1984–present), The Boy and the Heron (2023).
- Mike Nichols: Sam O'Steen (1966–1994), The Graduate (1967).
- Alan Parker: Gerry Hambling (1974–2003), Mississippi Burning (1988).
- Alexander Payne: Kevin Tent (1996–present), The Descendants (2011).
- Sean Penn: Jay Cassidy (1991–present), Into the Wild (2007).
- Sydney Pollack: Fredric Steinkamp (1969–1995), Tootsie (1982).
- Rob Reiner: Robert Leighton (1984–2010), A Few Good Men (1992).
- Éric Rohmer: Cécile Decugis (1959–1984), My Night at Maud's (1969).
- Kevin Reynolds: Peter Boyle (1988–2006), Tristan & Isolde (2006).
- Joseph Sargent: Michael Brown (1980–2008), Something the Lord Made (2004).
- Fred Schepisi: Peter Honess (1985–2013), Words and Pictures (2013).
- Franklin J. Schaffner: Robert Swink (1964–1989), The Boys from Brazil (1978).
- Ron Shelton: Paul Seydor (1992–present), Just Getting Started (2017).
- John Singleton: Bruce Cannon (1991–2017), Boyz n the Hood (1991).
- Wong Kar-wai: William Chang (1988–present), In the Mood for Love (2000).
- Anthony Waller: Peter Adam (1995–present), The Piper (2023).
- Edward Zwick: Steven Rosenblum (1989–present), Glory (1989).
- Gina Prince-Bythewood: Terilyn A. Shropshire (2000-present), Love and Basketball (2000), The Woman King (2022), Children of Blood and Bone (film) (2027)

== 20–24 years ==
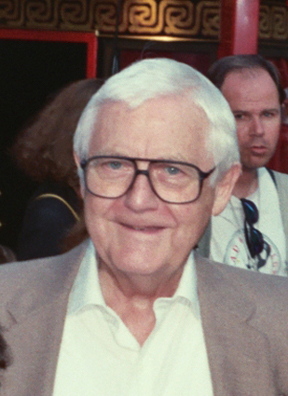
1990 photograph of Robert Wise, the editor of Citizen Kane (1941) and the director of West Side Story (1961)

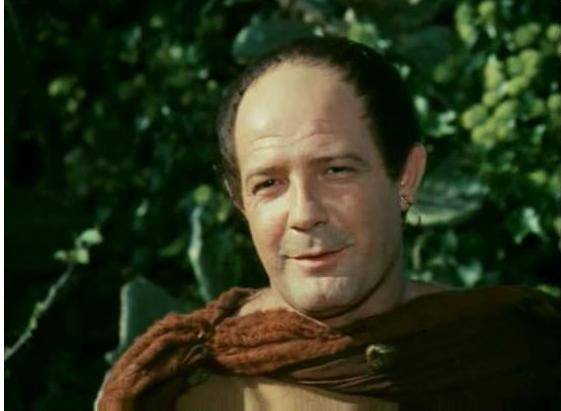
Ruggiero Mastroianni, the editor of Amarcord (1973)

- Woody Allen: Alisa Lepselter (1999–present), Midnight in Paris (2011).
- Paul Thomas Anderson: Dylan Tichenor (1997–2017), There Will Be Blood (2007).
- Robert Aldrich: Michael Luciano (1955–1977), The Dirty Dozen (1967).
- Woody Allen: Susan E. Morse (1977–1998), Hannah and Her Sisters (1986).
- Richard Attenborough: Lesley Walker (1987–2007), Cry Freedom (1987).
- Warren Beatty: Robert C. Jones (1978–1998), Bulworth (1998).
- Donald Cammell: Frank Mazzola (1977–1999), The Argument (1999).
- Kevin Costner: Miklos Wright (2003–present), Horizon: An American Saga (2024-present).
- Sean S. Cunningham: Nelson Torres (2001–2022), The Connection (2022).
- Michael Curtiz: Owen Marks (1930–1953), Casablanca (1942).
- Jonathan Demme: Craig McKay (1980–2004), The Silence of the Lambs (1991).
- Blake Edwards: Ralph E. Winters (1963–1984), Victor Victoria (1982).
- Antoine Fuqua: Conrad Buff IV (2001–present), The Equalizer 3 (2023).
- Federico Fellini: Ruggero Mastroianni (1965–1986), Amarcord (1973).
- James Goldstone: Edward A. Biery (1968–1988), Earth Star Voyager (1988).
- Lasse Hallström: Andrew Mondshein (1991–present), Chocolat (2000).
- Henry Hathaway: Dorothy Spencer (1941–1964), Circus World (1964).
- Jean-Pierre Jeunet: Hervé Schneid (1991–present), Amélie (2001).
- Walter Lang: Robert L. Simpson (1940–1960), The King and I (1956).
- Yorgos Lanthimos: Yorgos Mavropsaridis (2001–present), The Favourite (2018).
- Barry Levinson: Stu Linder (1982–2004), Rain Man (1988).
- Mitchell Leisen: Doane Harrison (1935–1958), Hold Back the Dawn (1941).
- Richard Linklater: Sandra Adair (1993–present), Boyhood (2014).
- Tom McCarthy: Tom McArdle (2003–present), Spotlight (2015).
- Sean McNamara: Jeffey Canavan (2004–present), On a Wing and a Prayer (2023).
- Alan J. Pakula: Sam O'Steen (1969–1992), Consenting Adults (1992).
- Park Chan-wook: Kim Sang-bum (1999–present), Decision to Leave (2022).
- Tyler Perry: Maysie Hoy (2001–present), A Jazzman's Blues (2022).
- Roman Polanski: Sam O'Steen (1968–1988), Chinatown (1974).
- Sydney Pollack: William Steinkamp (1982–2005), Out of Africa (1985).
- Fred Olen Ray: Randy Carter (1998–2018), A Wedding for Christmas (2018).
- Fred Olen Ray: Christopher Roth (1989–2014), A Perfect Christmas List (2014).
- Matt Reeves: Stan Salfas (1996–2017), War for the Planet of the Apes (2017).
- Michael Ritchie: Richard A. Harris (1969–1989), Fletch Lives (1989).
- John Schlesinger: Richard Marden (1971–1993), Sunday Bloody Sunday (1971).
- Ridley Scott: Pietro Scalia (1997–2017), Gladiator (2000).
- Tony Scott: Chris Lebenzon (1986–2010), Top Gun (1986).
- Oliver Stone: David Brenner (1988–2010) and Joe Hutshing (1988–2012), Born on the Fourth of July (1989).
- John Sturges: Ferris Webster (1950–1972), The Great Escape (1963).
- Duccio Tessari: Mario Morra (1969–1991), Beyond Justice (1991).
- Robert Wise: William H. Reynolds (1951–1973), The Sound of Music (1965).
- Stephen Sommers: Bob Ducsay (1989–2009), The Mummy (1999).

== 15–19 years ==
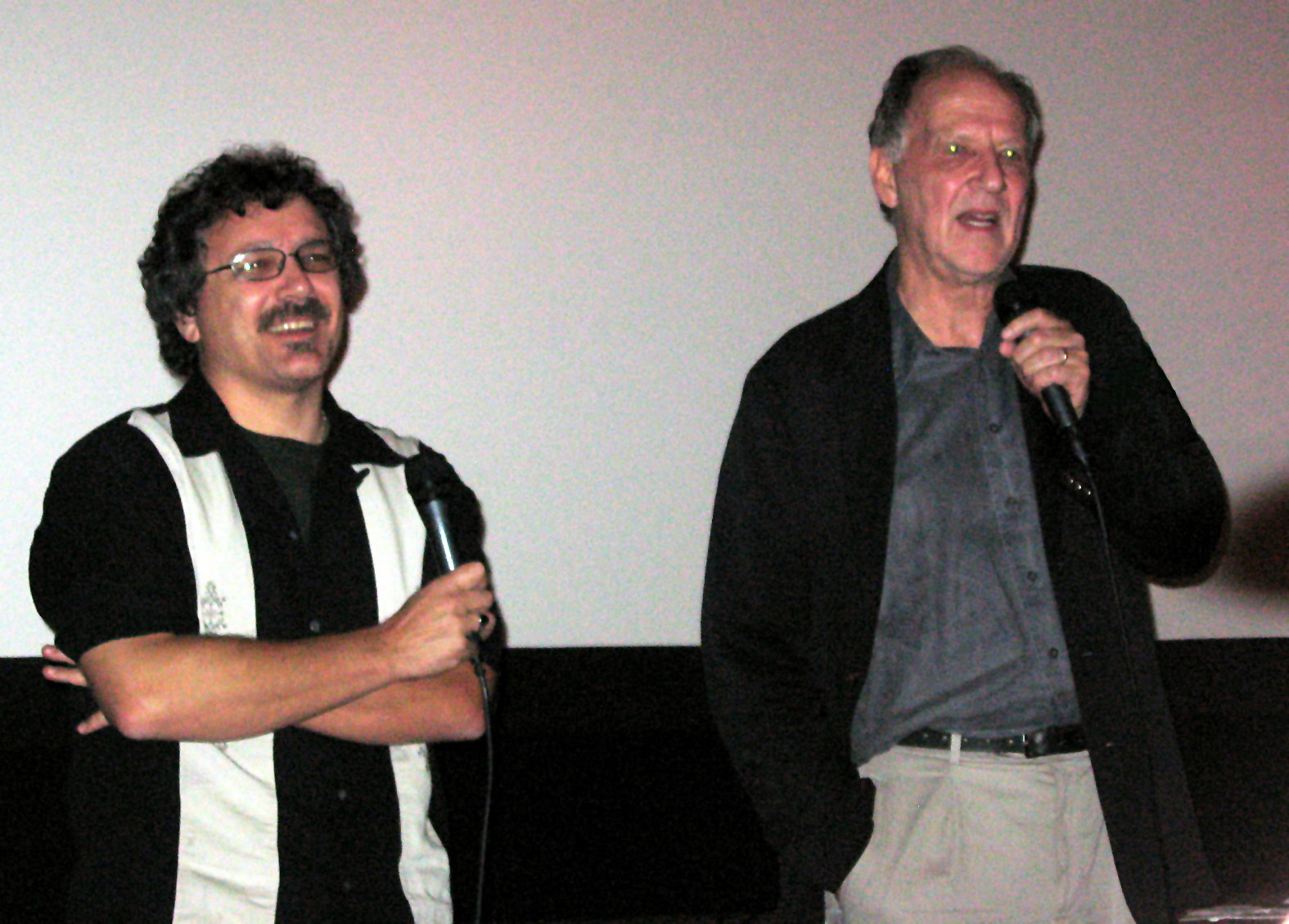
Joe Bini and Werner Herzog in 2008, following the release of the documentary film Encounters at the End of the World

- Ben Affleck: William Goldenberg (2007–present), Argo (2012).
- Wes Anderson: Andrew Weisblum (2007–present), Isle of Dogs (2018).
- Michaelangelo Antonioni: Eraldo Da Roma (1950–1965), L'Avventura (1960).
- Michael Apted: Jim Clark (1979–1994), Nell (1994).
- Dario Argento: Franco Fraticelli (1970–1987), Opera (1987).
- Michael Bay: Roger Barton (2001–present), 6 Underground (2019).
- Claude Berri: Hervé de Luze (1981–1999), Jean de Florette (1986).
- Thomas Bezucha: Jeffrey Ford (2005–present), Let Him Go (2020).
- Clarence Brown: Robert J. Kern (1934–1952), National Velvet (1944).
- Jane Campion: Veronika Jenet (1983–1999), The Piano (1993).
- William Dieterle: Warren Low (1936–1951), Red Mountain (1951).
- Richard Donner: Stuart Baird (1976–1994), Superman (1978).
- Stanley Donen: Richard Marden (1967–1984), Blame It on Rio (1984).
- David Fincher: Kirk Baxter (2008–present), The Social Network (2010).
- David Frankel: Steven Weinberg (1995–2012), Hope Springs (2012).
- William Graham: Ronald J. Fagan (1974–1991), Return to the Blue Lagoon (1991).
- F. Gary Gray: Christian Wagner (1998–present), The Fate of the Furious (2017).
- Luca Guadagnino: Walter Fasano (1999–present), Call Me by Your Name (2017).
- Werner Herzog: Beate Mainka-Jellinghaus (1968–1984), Fitzcarraldo (1982).
- Werner Herzog: Joe Bini (1997–present), Encounters at the End of the World (2007).
- Scott Hicks: Pip Karmel (1988–2007), Shine (1996).
- John Huston: Russell Lloyd (1956–1975), The Man Who Would Be King (1975).
- John Huston: Ralph Kemplen (1951–1966), The African Queen (1951).
- Peter Hyams: James Mitchell (1972–1990), Narrow Margin (1990).
- Peter Jackson: Jamie Selkirk (1987–2005), The Lord of the Rings: The Return of the King (2003).
- Norman Jewison: Antony Gibbs (1971–1989), Fiddler on the Roof (1971).
- Spike Jonze: Eric Zumbrunnen (1997–2013), Being John Malkovich (1999).
- Neil Jordan: Tony Lawson (1996–present), The End of the Affair (1999).
- Henry King: Barbara McLean (1936–1955), Twelve O'Clock High (1949).
- David Koepp: Jill Savitt (1996–2015), Mortdecai (2015).
- Andrei Konchalovsky: Henry Richardson (1985–2003), Runaway Train (1985).
- John Landis: George Folsey Jr. (1973–1988), Coming to America (1988).
- Sergio Leone: Nino Baragli (1968–1984), Once Upon a Time in America (1984).
- Kevin Macdonald: Justine Wright (1999–present), The Last King of Scotland (2006).
- James Mangold: Michael McCusker (2005–present), Walk the Line (2005).
- Joseph L. Mankiewicz: Dorothy Spencer (1946–1963), Cleopatra (1963).
- Garry Marshall: Bruce Green (1999–2016), Mother's Day (2016).
- Katsuhiro Otomo: Takeshi Seyama (1988–2004), Steamboy (2004).
- Pier Paolo Pasolini: Nino Baragli (1959–1975), The Gospel According to St. Matthew (1964).
- Albert Pyun: Ken Morrisey (1994–2010), Bulletface (2010).
- Brett Ratner: Mark Helfrich (1997–2014), Hercules (2014).
- Nicholas Roeg: Tony Lawson (1980–1995), Two Deaths (1995).
- Russell Rouse: Chester Schaeffer (1951–1967), The Well (1951).
- David O. Russell: Pamela Martin (1994–2010), The Fighter (2010).
- Josh Safdie: Himself (2008–present) and Ronald Bronstein (2009–present), Marty Supreme (2025).
- Joseph Sargent: George Jay Nicholson (1972–1989), The Karen Carpenter Story (1989).
- Joseph Sargent: Patrick Kennedy (1970–1985), Space (1985).
- John Schlesinger: Jim Clark (1965–1981), Marathon Man (1976).
- Quentin Tarantino: Sally Menke (1992–2009), Pulp Fiction (1994).
- J. Lee Thompson: Richard Best (1953–1969), Ice Cold in Alex (1958).
- Gore Verbinski: Craig Wood (1996–2013), Rango (2011).
- Henri Verneuil: Henri Lanoe (1975–1992), 588, Street Paradises (1992).
- Mark Waters: Bruce Green (2003–present), Magic Camp (2020).
- Peter Weir: William M. Anderson (1981–1998), The Truman Show (1998).
- Peter Weir: Lee Smith (1993–2010), Master and Commander: The Far Side of the World (2003).
- Lina Wertmüller: Franco Fraticelli (1966–1983), Seven Beauties (1975).
- William Wyler: Robert Swink (1951–1970), Roman Holiday (1953).
- Franco Zeffirelli: Peter Taylor (1967–1986), La Traviata (1983).
- Robert Zemeckis: Arthur Schmidt (1985–2000), Forrest Gump (1994).
- Robert Zemeckis: Jeremiah O' Driscoll (2004–present), Flight (2012).

== 9–14 years ==
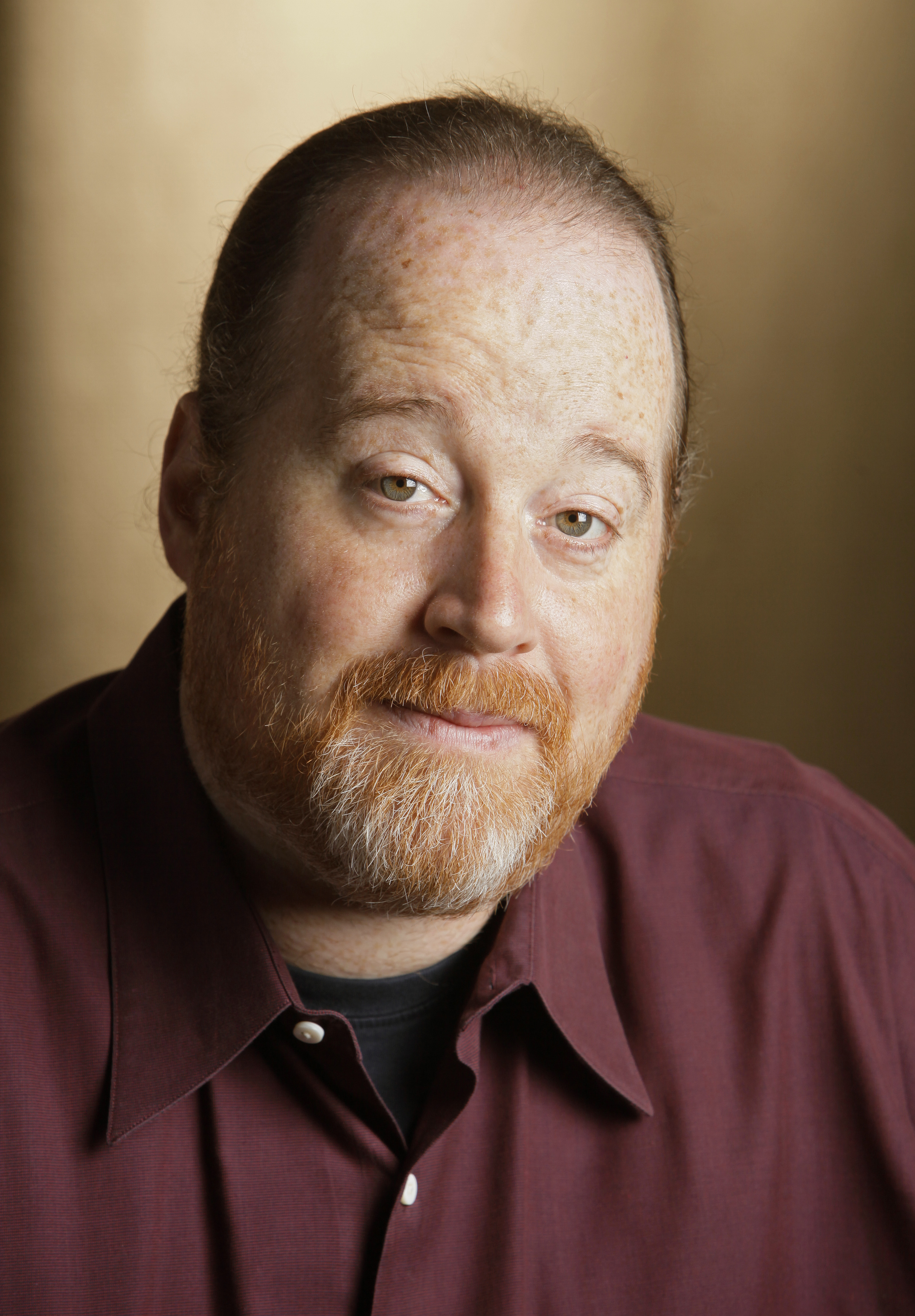
Stephen Mirrione has received Oscar nominations for his editing of films directed by George Clooney, Alejandro González Iñárritu, and Steven Soderbergh.

- J. J. Abrams: Maryann Brandon and Mary Jo Markey (2006–present), Star Wars: The Force Awakens (2015).
- Robert Altman: Geraldine Peroni (1990–2003), The Player (1992).
- Woody Allen: Ralph Rosenblum (1969–78), Annie Hall (1977).
- Paul Thomas Anderson: Andy Jurgensen (2015–present), One Battle After Another (2025).
- Darren Aronofsky: Andrew Weisblum (2008–present), Black Swan (2010).
- Hal Ashby: Robert C. Jones (1973–1982), Bound for Glory (1976).
- Jon Avnet: Peter E. Berger (1997–2007), 88 Minutes (2007).
- Michael Bay: Christian Wagner (1995–2005), The Island (2005).
- Luc Besson: Julien Day (2009–present), Anna (2019).
- Ingmar Bergman: Oscar Rosander (1946–1960), Wild Strawberries (1957).
- Bernardo Bertolucci: Gabriella Cristiani (1979–1990), The Last Emperor (1987).
- Kathryn Bigelow: Howard E. Smith (1987–2000), The Weight of Water (2000).
- Neill Blomkamp: Julian Clarke (2009–present), District 9 (2009).
- Don Bluth: Fiona Trayler: (1991–2000), Titan A.E. (2000).
- Danny Boyle: Jon Harris (2010–present), 127 Hours (2010).
- Kenneth Branagh: Neil Farrell (1995–2007), Sleuth (2007).
- Martin Brest: Michael Tronick (1988–1998), Scent of a Woman (1992).
- Charles Burnett: Nancy Richardson (1990–2000), Selma, Lord, Selma (1999).
- James Cameron: Mark Goldblatt (1984–1994), Terminator 2: Judgment Day (1991).
- James Cameron: Stephen E. Rivkin and John Refoua (2009–present), Avatar (2009).
- Frank Capra: William Hornbeck (1946–1959), It's a Wonderful Life (1946).
- John Carpenter: Marion Rothman (1983–1992), Memoirs of an Invisible Man (1992).
- John Carpenter: Edward A. Warschier (1986–1998), Vampires (1998).
- Michael Caton-Jones: Jim Clark (1990–2002), City by the Sea (2002).
- George Clooney: Stephen Mirrione (2002–present), Good Night, and Good Luck (2005).
- René Clément: Fedora Zincone (1963–1975), Wanted: Babysitter (1975).
- Henri-Georges Clouzot: Madeleine Gug (1953–1967), The Wages of Fear (1953).
- Ryan Coogler: Michael P. Shawver (2013–present), Black Panther (2018).
- Martha Coolidge: Steven Cohen (1991–2006), Material Girls (2006).
- Francis Ford Coppola: Melissa Kent (1983–1997), The Rainmaker (1997).
- Sofia Coppola: Sarah Flack (2003–present), Lost in Translation (2003).
- Roger Corman: Ronald Sinclair (1955–1967), The Trip (1967).
- Alfonso Cuarón: Steven Weisberg (1995–2004), Harry Potter and the Prisoner of Azkaban (2004).
- Wes Craven: Patrick Lussier (1992–2005), Cursed (2005).
- Damien Chazelle: Tom Cross (2013–present), Whiplash (2014).
- Jules Dassin: Roger Dwyre (1955–1966), Never on Sunday (1960).
- Andrew Davis: Dennis Virkler (1992–2006), The Fugitive (1993).
- Howard Deutch: Bud S. Smith (1987–2000), The Replacements (2000).
- Danny DeVito: Lynzee Klingman (1989–2003), Duplex (2003).
- Roger Donaldson: John Gilbert (2005–present), The World's Fastest Indian (2005).
- Stanley Donen: George Hively (1974–1984), Blame It on Rio (1984).
- Jon Favreau: Dan Lebental (2003–present), Iron Man (2008).
- Clint Eastwood: Ferris Webster (1973–1982), Honkytonk Man (1982).
- Blake Edwards: John F. Burnett (1971–1986), A Fine Mess (1986).
- Paul Feig: Brent White (2013–present), Another Simple Favor (2025).
- David Fincher: Angus Wall (2002–2011), The Social Network (2010).
- Richard Fleischer: Frank J. Urioste (1974–1985), Red Sonja (1985).
- James Foley: Howard E. Smith (1986–1999), The Corruptor (1999).
- John Ford: James B. Clark (1941–1950), How Green Was My Valley (1941).
- John Ford: Dorothy Spencer (1939–1952), Stagecoach (1939).
- Marc Forster: Matt Chessé (2000–present), Finding Neverland (2004).
- Bob Fosse: Alan Heim (1974–1983), All That Jazz (1979).
- William Friedkin: Bud S. Smith (1973–1986), The Exorcist (1973).
- Tay Garnett: Dorothy Spencer (1937–1948), Slightly Honorable (1948).
- Craig Gillespie: Tatiana S. Riegel (2007–present), I, Tonya (2017).
- Alejandro González Iñárritu: Stephen Mirrione (2003–present), Babel (2006).
- Stuart Gordon: Andy Horvitch (1991–2005), Edmond (2005).
- Paul Greengrass: Christopher Rouse (2004–present), The Bourne Ultimatum (2007).
- Davis Guggenheim: Jay Cassidy (2000–2011), An Inconvenient Truth (2006).
- James Gunn: Fred Raskin (2014–2023), Guardians of the Galaxy Vol. 3 (2023).
- Randa Haines: Lisa Fruchtman (1986–1998), Dance with Me (1998).
- Henry Hathaway: James B. Clark (1942–1956), 23 Paces to Baker Street (1956).
- Todd Haynes: Affonso Gonçalves (2011-present), Carol (2015).
- Arthur Hiller: William Reynolds (1982–1996), Carpool (1996).
- George Roy Hill: William Reynolds (1973–1984), The Sting (1973).
- Alfred Hitchcock: George Tomasini (1954–1964), North by Northwest (1959).
- Peter H. Hunt: Frank Morriss (1979–1992), Secrets (1992).
- Tim Hunter: Howard E. Smith (1982–1996), The People Next Door (1996).
- Peter Hyams: Jeff Gullo (1999–2009), Beyond a Reasonable Doubt (2009).
- James Ivory: Andrew Marcus (1987–1996), Howards End (1992).
- Norman Jewison: Stephen E. Rivkin (1994–2003), The Statement (2003).
- Glenn Jordan: John Wright (1979–1991), Sarah, Plain and Tall (1991).
- Jeremy Kagan: David Holden (1985–1994), Roswell (1994).
- Jonathan Kaplan: O. Nicholas Brown (1975–1988), The Accused (1988).
- Shekhar Kapur: Jill Bilcock (1998–present), Elizabeth (1998).
- Philip Kaufman: Douglas Stewart (1972–1983), The Right Stuff (1983).
- Randal Kleiser: Jeff Gourson (1986–1998), Shadow of Doubt (1998).
- Ted Kotcheff: Joan Chapman (1982–1992), Folks! (1992).
- Stanley Kubrick: Ray Lovejoy (1968–1980), 2001: A Space Odyssey (1968).
- Aldo Lado: Alberto Gallitti (1971–1981), La disubbidienza (1981).
- Francis Lawrence: Mark Yoshikawa (2014–present), The Hunger Games: The Ballad of Songbirds and Snakes (2023).
- Spike Lee: Sam Pollard (1990–2000), 4 Little Girls (1997).
- Mervyn LeRoy: Harold F. Kress (1941–1954), Random Harvest (1942).
- Shawn Levy: Dean Zimmerman (2009–present), The Adam Project (2022).
- Kevin Lima: Gregory Perler (1995–2007), Enchanted (2007).
- Justin Lin: Kelly Matsumoto (2006–2016), Fast & Furious (2013).
- Jerry London: Michael Brown (1988–1998), Beauty (1998).
- Joseph Losey: Reginald Mills (1954–1964), The Servant (1963).
- Baz Luhrmann: Jill Bilcock (1992–2002), Moulin Rouge! (2002).
- David Lynch: Mary Sweeney (1992–2001), Mulholland Drive (2001).
- David Mackenzie: Jake Roberts (2002–present), Hell or High Water (2016).
- Michael Mann: William Goldenberg (1995–2006), The Insider (1999).
- Rob Marshall: Wyatt Smith (2009–present), Mary Poppins Returns (2018).
- Paul Mazursky: Donn Cambern (1973–1982), Tempest (1982).
- Martin McDonagh: Jon Gregory (2008–present), Three Billboards Outside Ebbing, Missouri (2017).
- Steve McQueen: Joe Walker (2008–present), 12 Years a Slave (2013).
- John McTiernan: John Wright (1990–2002), The Hunt for Red October (1990).
- Fernando Meirelles: Daniel Rezende (2002–2011), City of God (2002).
- Sam Mendes: Tariq Anwar (1999–2008), American Beauty (1999).
- John Milius: Carroll Timothy O'Meara (1978–1991), Flight of the Intruder (1991).
- Vincente Minnelli: Adrienne Fazan (1951–1963), Gigi (1958).
- Vincente Minnelli: Albert Akst (1944–1955), Trial (1955).
- Vincente Minnelli: Ferris Webster (1946–1956), Tea and Sympathy (1956).
- Andrew Niccol: Zach Staenberg (2005–2014), Good Kill (2014).
- Christopher Nolan: Lee Smith (2005–2017), Dunkirk (2017).
- Arthur Penn: Dede Allen (1967–1976), Bonnie and Clyde (1967).
- Sidney Poitier: Pembroke J. Herring (1972–1990), Ghost Dad (1990).
- Roman Polanski: Alastair McIntyre (1965–1979), Tess (1979).
- Powell and Pressburger: Reginald Mills (1946–1956), The Red Shoes (1948).
- Albert Pyun: Dennis O'Connor (1985–1996), Raven Hawk (1996).
- Fred Olen Ray: W. Peter Miller (1993–2002), Southern Disconfort: Wrestling on the Indie Circuit (2002).
- Harold Ramis: Pembroke J. Herring (1983–1996), Multiplicity (1996).
- Rob Reiner: Bob Joyce (2015–present), Albert Brooks: Defending My Life (2023).
- Jason Reitman: Dana E. Glauberman (2005–present), Up in the Air (2009).
- Martin Ritt: Frank Bracht (1963–1974), Conrack (1974).
- Mark Robson: Dorothy Spencer (1960–1974), Earthquake (1974).
- David O. Russell: Jay Cassidy (2012–present), American Hustle (2013).
- Anthony and Joe Russo: Jeffrey Ford (2014–present), The Electric State (2025).
- Chris Sanders: Darren T. Holmes (2002–present), How to Train Your Dragon (2010).
- John Schlesinger: Peter Honess (1987–2000), The Next Best Thing (2000).
- Tony Scott: Christian Wagner (1993–2005), Domino (2005).
- Tom Shadyac: Don Zimmerman (1994–2002), Ace Ventura: Pet Detective (1994).
- Brad Silberling: Michael Kahn (1995–2006), 10 Items or Less (2006).
- Steven Soderbergh: Stephen Mirrione (2000–2011), Traffic (2000).
- Stephen Sommers: Kelly Matsumoto (1999–2009), G.I. Joe: The Rise of Cobra (2009).
- George Stevens: Robert Swink (1948–1959), The Diary of Anne Frank (1959).
- Robert Stevenson: Cotton Warburton (1961–1974), Mary Poppins (1964).
- Julie Taymor: Françoise Bonnot (1999–2010), The Tempest (2010).
- Richard Thorpe: Ralph E. Winters (1943–1957), Jailhouse Rock (1957).
- George Tillman Jr.: Dirk Westervelt (2000–2010), Faster (2010).
- Guillermo del Toro: Bernat Vilaplana (2001–2015), Pan's Labyrinth (2006).
- Tom Tykwer: Mathilde Bonnefoy (1998–2010), Run Lola Run (1998).
- Paul Verhoeven: Job ter Burg: (2006–present), Elle (2016).
- Denis Villeneuve: Joe Walker (2014–present), Arrival (2015).
- Luchino Visconti: Ruggero Mastroianni (1967–1976), Death in Venice (1971).
- The Wachowskis: Zach Staenberg (1996–2008), The Matrix (1999).
- Denzel Washington: Hughes Winborne (2007–present), Fences (2016).
- Keoni Waxman: Trevor Mirosh (2009–present), The Modelizer (2023).
- Forest Whitaker: Richard Chew (1995–2004), First Daughter (2004).
- Billy Wilder: Doane Harrison (1942–1954), Sunset Boulevard (1950).
- Billy Wilder: Arthur P. Schmidt (1950–1959), Sunset Boulevard (1950).
- Billy Wilder: Daniel Mandell (1957–1966), The Apartment (1960).
- Simon Wincer: Terry Blythe (1998–2008), Comanche Moon (2008).
- Edgar Wright: Jonathan Amos and Paul Machliss (2010–present), Baby Driver (2017).
- Joe Wright: Paul Tothill (2003–present), Atonement (2007).
- William Wyler: Daniel Mandell (1933–1946), The Best Years of Our Lives (1946).
- Peter Yates: Ray Lovejoy (1983–1992), The Dresser (1983).
- Chloé Zhao: (2015–present), Nomadland (2020).
- Franco Zeffirelli: Reginald Mills (1968–1979), Romeo and Juliet (1968).
- Barbet Schroeder: Lee Percy (1990–2002), Single White Female (1992)
- Craig R. Baxley: Mark Helfrich (1988–1991), Action Jackson (1988)
- Chris Columbus: Raja Gosnell (1988–1995), Home Alone (1990)
- Stephen Herek: Trudy Ship (1995–2002), 101 Dalmatians (1996)
- Brian Levant: Kent Beyda (1994–2000), The Flintstones (1994)
