= Steinkamp =

Steinkamp is a surname. Notable people with the surname include:

- Fredric Steinkamp (1928–2002), American film editor
- Jennifer Steinkamp (born 1958), American installation artist
- Tyler Steinkamp (born 1995), American internet personality
- William Steinkamp (1953–2025), American film editor
