= American Cinema Editors Career Achievement Award =

Annual US film and television award

The American Cinema Editors (ACE) gives one or more Career Achievement Awards each year. The first awards were given in 1988.

== List of honorees ==
=== 1980s ===
- 1988: Barbara McLean and Gene Milford
- 1989: Warren Low and Dorothy Spencer

=== 1990s ===
- 1990: Margaret Booth and Elmo Williams
- 1991: William H. Reynolds and Ralph E. Winters
- 1992: Harold F. Kress and Charles Nelson
- 1993: Rudi Fehr and Robert Swink
- 1994: Dede Allen and Gene Ruggiero
- 1995: David Bretherton and Anne V. Coates
- 1996: Desmond Marquette and Aaron Stell
- 1997: Fred W. Berger and Harry W. Gerstad
- 1998: Gerry Hambling and John Woodcock
- 1999: John Bloom and Arthur Schneider

=== 2000s ===
- 2000: Dann Cahn and Marjorie Fowler
- 2001: Stanley Frazen and Fredric Steinkamp
- 2002: Antony Gibbs and George Watters
- 2003: John F. Burnett and Tom Rolf
- 2004: Donn Cambern and John A. Martinelli
- 2005: David Blewitt and Jim Clark
- 2006: Edward M. Abroms and Terry Rawlings
- 2007: John Soh and Frank J. Urioste
- 2008: Millie Moore and Bud S. Smith
- 2009: Sidney Katz and Arthur Schmidt

=== 2010s ===
- 2010: Paul LaMastra and Neil Travis
- 2011: Michael Kahn and Michael Brown
- 2012: Joel Cox and Doug Ibold
- 2013: Richard Marks and Lawrence Silk
- 2014: Richard Halsey and Robert C. Jones
- 2015: Diane Adler and Gerald B. Greenberg
- 2016: Carol Littleton and Ted Rich
- 2017: Janet Ashikaga and Thelma Schoonmaker
- 2018: Mark Goldblatt and Leon Ortiz-Gil
- 2019: Craig McKay and Jerrold L. Ludwig

=== 2020s ===
- 2020: Alan Heim and Tina Hirsch
- 2021: Lynzee Klingman and Sidney Wolinsky
- 2022: Lillian Benson and Richard Chew
- 2023: Lynne Willingham and Don Zimmerman
- 2024: Kate Amend and Walter Murch
- 2025: Paul Hirsch and Maysie Hoy

== See also ==
- Academy Award for Best Film Editing
