= Arthur Schmidt (film editor) =

American film editor (1937–2023)

- Publicity Photo of Arthur Schmidt
- Born: Arthur Robert Schmidt; June 17, 1937; Los Angeles, California, U.S.
- Died: August 5, 2023 (aged 86); Santa Barbara, California, U.S.
- Occupation: Film editor
- Spouse: Susan Craig
- Father: Arthur P. Schmidt

Arthur Robert Schmidt (June 17, 1937 – August 5, 2023) was an American film editor with about 27 film credits between 1977 and 2005. Schmidt had an extended collaboration with director Robert Zemeckis from the Back to the Future film trilogy (1985–1990) to Cast Away (2000).

== Life ==
Schmidt was born in Los Angeles on June 17, 1937, the son of film editor Arthur P. Schmidt; it is said that the younger Arthur's education in editing began when he watched his father editing the film Sunset Boulevard (1950). Schmidt graduated from Santa Clara University with a bachelor's degree in English.

Schmidt received the Academy Award for Best Film Editing for Who Framed Roger Rabbit (1988) and Forrest Gump (1994). In addition to these Oscars, Schmidt has won several "Eddies" from the American Cinema Editors for Pirates of the Caribbean: The Curse of the Black Pearl (with Craig Wood and Stephen E. Rivkin, 2003), Forrest Gump, and for a television special The Jericho Mile (1979). He has been nominated for major editing awards (including the BAFTA Award for Best Editing) for Coal Miner's Daughter (1980), Back to the Future (with Harry Keramidas, 1985), The Last of the Mohicans (with Dov Hoenig, 1992), and Cast Away (2000). He was the executive producer for The Labyrinth (2010).

Schmidt received the 2009 American Cinema Editors Career Achievement Award, which was presented to Schmidt by Zemeckis.

Schmidt died at his home in Santa Barbara, California, on August 5, 2023, at the age of 86.

== Filmography (as editor) ==
Year	Title	Director	Notes
1977	The Last Remake of Beau Geste	Marty Feldman	co-edited with Jim Clark
1978	Jaws 2	Jeannot Szwarc	
1979	The Jericho Mile	Michael Mann	
1980	Coal Miner's Daughter	Michael Apted	Nominated—Academy Award for Best Film Editing
1980	The Idolmaker	Taylor Hackford	
1982	The Escape Artist	Caleb Deschanel	
1984	The Buddy System	Glenn Jordan	
1984	Firstborn	Michael Apted	
1985	Fandango	Kevin Reynolds	
1985	Back to the Future	Robert Zemeckis	Nominated—BAFTA Award for Best Editing
1986	Ruthless People	David Zucker	
1986	Ruthless People	Jim Abrahams	
1986	Ruthless People	Jerry Zucker	
1988	Who Framed Roger Rabbit	Robert Zemeckis	Academy Award for Best Film Editing
1988	Who Framed Roger Rabbit	Robert Zemeckis	Nominated—BAFTA Award for Best Editing
1989	Back to the Future Part II	Robert Zemeckis	
1990	Back to the Future Part III	Robert Zemeckis	
1991	The Rocketeer	Joe Johnston	
1992	Death Becomes Her	Robert Zemeckis	
1992	The Last of the Mohicans	Michael Mann	
1993	Addams Family Values	Barry Sonnenfeld	
1994	Forrest Gump	Robert Zemeckis	Academy Award for Best Film Editing
1994	Forrest Gump	Robert Zemeckis	ACE Eddie
1994	Forrest Gump	Robert Zemeckis	Nominated—BAFTA Award for Best Editing
1996	The Birdcage	Mike Nichols	
1996	Chain Reaction	Andrew Davis	
1997	Contact	Robert Zemeckis	
1998	Primary Colors	Mike Nichols	
2000	What Lies Beneath	Robert Zemeckis	
2000	Cast Away	Robert Zemeckis	
2003	Pirates of the Caribbean: The Curse of the Black Pearl	Gore Verbinski	
2005	The Chumscrubber	Arie Posin	

== See also ==
- List of film director and editor collaborations
