= Hide in Plain Sight =

- Directed by: James Caan
- Screenplay by: Spencer Eastman
- Based on: Hide in Plain Sight; 1976 book by Leslie Waller
- Produced by: Robert W. Christiansen; Rick Rosenberg
- Starring: James Caan; Jill Eikenberry; Robert Viharo; Barbra Rae; Joe Grifasi; Kenneth McMillan; Josef Sommer; Danny Aiello
- Cinematography: Paul Lohmann
- Edited by: Fredric Steinkamp; William Steinkamp
- Music by: Leonard Rosenman
- Production company: Metro-Goldwyn-Mayer
- Distributed by: United Artists (United States/Canada); Cinema International Corporation (International)
- Release date: April 21, 1980 (Portugal)
- Running time: 92 minutes
- Country: United States
- Language: English
- Budget: $6 million
- Box office: under $2 million (North America), $3,806,930

Hide in Plain Sight is a 1980 American drama film directed by and starring James Caan with the story line based on an actual case from the files of New York attorney Salvatore R. Martoche, who represented Tom Leonhard, a real-life victim from Buffalo, New York who had sued to recover contact with his children, estranged by the culpability of the new husband and government, soon realizing his own past is coming back to get him.

== Plot ==
Divorced father Thomas Hacklin discovers, on visiting his children, that his ex-wife's residence has been abandoned; he is unable to locate or contact them. He is mystified after approaching the authorities, who refuse to assist, but speculates when he becomes aware that her new husband is in the United States Federal Witness Protection Program. As he makes inroads into finding their location, the police and authorities make it more difficult for him to make contact. He becomes determined upon discovering the government advised the low-tier mobster new husband to marry his ex-wife in order to disqualify her from testifying against him in the eventuality of a trial for his criminal activities. The mob follows Hacklin's actions for their own purposes.

== Cast ==
- James Caan as Thomas Hacklin, Jr.
- Jill Eikenberry as Alisa
- Robert Viharo as Jack Scolese
- Barbra Rae as Ruthie Hacklin
- Joe Grifasi as Matty Stanke
- Kenneth McMillan as Sam Marzetta
- Josef Sommer as Jason R. Reid
- Danny Aiello as Sal Carvello
- Beatrice Winde as Unemployment Clerk
- Andrew Gordon Fenwick as Andy Hacklin
- Heather Bicknell as Junie Hacklin
- David Clennon as Richard Fieldston

== Reception ==
Hide in Plain Sight received a mixed reception from critics.

Roger Ebert of the Chicago Sun-Times gave the film two out of four stars and praised the acting, but ultimately viewed the film negatively, calling it "a frustrating real-life thriller that makes the fatal mistake of being more true to real life than to the demands of narrative." Variety also wrote the film a mixed review, stating "Hide in Plain Sight has some of the makings of a good, honest film. It tells the true story of a working man's fight against the system, features several poignant moments, and makes a number of political messages in an effective yet unobtrusive manner. But in his directorial debut, James Caan never musters the energy or emotion needed to break the unbearably slow, dismal tone." Filmink magazine wrote "Caan’s handling of the material is genuinely assured and interesting – he uses lots of masters and long takes (he seems influenced by Claude Lelouch). His acting is excellent too, although the script doesn’t quite work; it never seems to make up its mind if it wants to go realistic or Hollywood.

== Production ==
The film was Caan's passion project, taking him two years to make. It was his intention to release the film without a music score, but MGM executives prevailed.

== Release ==
=== Home media ===
The film was released on VHS in 1981 and 1992 by MGM/UA Home Video and on DVD in 2010 by Warner Home Video (Warner Archive).
