= Antony Gibbs =

British film editor (1925–2016)

- An undated photo of Gibbs
- Born: 17 October 1925; London, England
- Died: 26 February 2016 (aged 90); England
- Other name: Tony Gibbs (Note: Gibbs is billed as "Tony Gibbs" in The Man Without a Face, Don Juan DeMarco, Ronin, and Reindeer Games.)
- Occupation: Film editor
- Years active: 1950s–2001
- Awards: See below
- Military career
- Allegiance: United Kingdom
- Branch: Royal Marines
- Conflicts: World War II

Antony Gibbs (17 October 1925 – 26 February 2016), sometimes credited as Tony Gibbs, was an English film editor. He was noted for his collaborations with directors Tony Richardson, Norman Jewison, Nicolas Roeg and Richard Lester and held more than 40 feature film credits. Initially active during the British New Wave era, he was nominated for the BAFTA Award for Best Editing four times, for Performance (1970); Fiddler on the Roof (1971); Rollerball (1975) and A Bridge Too Far (1977). He was also a two-time Primetime Emmy nominee.

== Early life ==
Gibbs was born in London in 1925. His father, Harold, was a police officer, and his mother, Violet, was a cook. He served in the Royal Marines during the Second World War.

== Career ==
Gibbs' editing career began in the mid-1950s as an assistant to Ralph Kemplen and to Alan Osbiston, and through them he became involved with the brief "New Wave" of British filmmaking at its beginnings. In particular Osbiston (and Gibbs) edited The Entertainer (1960), which was directed by Tony Richardson; Richardson was one of the most prominent of the British New Wave directors. Gibbs was then principal editor for several of the subsequent "New Wave" films, including Richardson's A Taste of Honey (1961), The Loneliness of the Long Distance Runner (1962), and Tom Jones (1963), and also The Knack ...and How to Get It (1965), which was directed by Richard Lester.

In his 1995 book, Film and Video Editing, Roger Crittenden notes the influence of this first phase of Gibbs' editing career, "The generation of American editors of which Dede Allen is a part has given considerable credit for the inspiration of their work to Antony Gibbs, the English editor of films directed by, amongst others, Tony Richardson, Nicolas Roeg, and Richard Lester. There is a daring and energetic quality to Tony Gibbs' work, especially in some sequences of The Loneliness of the Long Distance Runner, Tom Jones, The Knack, and Performance, which must have given a shot of adrenaline to aspiring editors on both sides of the Atlantic at the time. Dede ascribes her work on Bonnie and Clyde directly to the influence of Tony Gibbs." Bonnie and Clyde (1967) "marked a turning point in the editing of feature films that sent reverberations through the entire American cinema."

Gibbs was the "supervising editor" for Richardson's 1965 American film, The Loved One. Gibbs relocated from England to California in about 1970. From 1971–89 he had an extended collaboration with Norman Jewison that commenced with the well-received Fiddler on the Roof (1971) and ultimately extended over five films. Gibbs retired from filmmaking in 2001.

Gibbs' editing of Tom Jones (1963) was nominated for an American Cinema Editors Eddie award. Tom Jones won the Academy Award for Best Picture, and Richardson received the Academy Award for Best Director for it. Subsequent to his "New Wave" films, Gibbs was nominated four times for the BAFTA Award for Best Editing, for the films Performance (directed by Donald Cammell & Nicolas Roeg-1970), Fiddler on the Roof (Jewison-1971), Rollerball (Jewison-1975), and A Bridge Too Far (Attenborough-1977). Gibbs was nominated again for ACE Eddie awards for Fiddler on the Roof and, much later in his career, he won Eddie awards for the television films George Wallace (Part II) (1997) and for James Dean (2001). Gibbs had been elected to membership in the American Cinema Editors, and was the recipient of the American Cinema Editors Career Achievement Award in 2002.

== Personal life ==
Gibbs was married three times, and had six children from two of them. He was a supporter of Chelsea F.C., and a classical music enthusiast.

=== Death ===
Gibbs died on 26 February 2016 at the age of 90.

== Filmography ==
=== Film ===
Year	Title	Director	Notes	Ref.
1960	The Unstoppable Man	Terry Bishop		
1960	Oscar Wilde	Gregory Ratoff		
1960	During One Night	Sidney J. Furie	1st of 4 collaborations with Furie	
1961	Doctor Blood's Coffin	Sidney J. Furie		
1961	The Snake Woman	Sidney J. Furie		
1961	Offbeat	Cliff Owen		
1961	A Taste of Honey	Tony Richardson	1st of 6 collaborations with Richardson	
1962	Tiara Tahiti	Ted Kotcheff		
1962	The Loneliness of the Long Distance Runner	Tony Richardson		
1963	Tom Jones	Tony Richardson		
1964	The Luck of Ginger Coffey	Irvin Kershner		
1965	The Loved One	Tony Richardson	Supervising editor	
1965	The Knack ...and How to Get It	Richard Lester	1st of 4 collaborations with Lester	
1966	Mademoiselle	Tony Richardson	Co-editor with Sophie Coussein	
1967	The Sailor from Gibraltar	Tony Richardson		
1968	Petulia	Richard Lester		
1968	The Birthday Party	William Friedkin		
1970	Performance	Donald Cammell; Nicolas Roeg	Co-editor with Brian Smedley-Aston and Frank Mazzola	
1970	All the Right Noises	Gerry O'Hara		
1971	Walkabout	Nicolas Roeg	Co-editor with Alan Pattillo	
1971	Fiddler on the Roof	Norman Jewison	1st of 6 collaborations with Jewison; Co-editor with Robert Lawrence	
1972	The Ragman's Daughter	Harold Becker		
1973	Jesus Christ Superstar	Norman Jewison		
1974	The Black Windmill	Don Siegel		
1974	Juggernaut	Richard Lester		
1975	Rollerball	Norman Jewison		
1976	The Sailor Who Fell from Grace with the Sea	Lewis John Carlino		
1977	A Bridge Too Far	Richard Attenborough		
1978	F.I.S.T.	Norman Jewison	Supervising editor	
1979	Yesterday's Hero	Neil Leifer		
1979	Butch and Sundance: The Early Days	Richard Lester	Supervising editor	
1980	The Wildcats of St Trinian's	Frank Launder		
1980	The Dogs of War	John Irvin		
1981	From a Far Country	Krzysztof Zanussi	Co-editor with Paolo Fabbri and Waldemar Król	
1981	Ragtime	Miloš Forman	Co-editor with Anne V. Coates and Stanley Warnow	
1983	Bad Boys	Rick Rosenthal		
1984	Dune	David Lynch		
1985	Agnes of God	Norman Jewison		
1986	Tai-Pan	Daryl Duke		
1987	Russkies	Rick Rosenthal		
1988	Stealing Home	Steven Kampmann; William Porter		
1989	In Country	Norman Jewison	Co-editor with Lou Lombardo	
1991	The Taking of Beverly Hills	Sidney J. Furie		
1993	The Man Without a Face	Mel Gibson		
1994	Don Juan DeMarco	Jeremy Leven		
1998	Ronin	John Frankenheimer		
2000	Reindeer Games	John Frankenheimer	Co-editor with Michael Kahn	
2003	Scorched	Gavin Grazer	Additional editor	
2005	Sahara	Breck Eisner	Additional editor	

=== Television ===
Year	Title	Director	Notes
1959	The Third Man	Anthony Bushell; Cliff Owen	3 episodes

TV movies and miniseries

Year	Film	Director	Notes	Ref.
1992	Devlin	Rick Rosenthal		
1996	A Case for Life	Eric Laneuville		
1996	Crime of the Century	Mark Rydell		
1997	George Wallace	John Frankenheimer	1st of 3 collaborations with Frankenheimer	
2001	James Dean	Mark Rydell		

== Awards and nominations ==
Award	Year	Category	Work	Result	Ref.
American Cinema Editors Award	1964	Best Edited Feature Film	Tom Jones	Nominated	
American Cinema Editors Award	1972	Best Edited Feature Film	Fiddler on the Roof	Nominated	
American Cinema Editors Award	1998	Best Edited Miniseries or Motion Picture for Television	George Wallace ("Part II")	Won	
American Cinema Editors Award	2002	Best Edited Miniseries or Motion Picture for Television	James Dean	Won	
American Cinema Editors Award	2002	Career Achievement Award	—N/a	Won	
British Academy Film Award	1972	Best Editing	Performance	Nominated	
British Academy Film Award	1972	Best Editing	Fiddler on the Roof	Nominated	
British Academy Film Award	1976	Best Editing	Rollerball	Nominated	
British Academy Film Award	1978	Best Editing	A Bridge Too Far	Nominated	
CableACE Award	1997	Editing a Dramatic Special or Series/Movie or Miniseries	George Wallace	Nominated	
Primetime Emmy Award	1997	Outstanding Picture Editing for a Limited Series or Movie	Crime of the Century	Nominated	
Primetime Emmy Award	2002	Outstanding Picture Editing for a Limited Series or Movie	James Dean	Nominated	

== See also ==
- List of film director and editor collaborations
