= Anne V. Coates =

British film editor (1925–2018)

Anne V. Coates OBE
- Born: Anne Voase Coates; 12 December 1925; Reigate, Surrey, England
- Died: 8 May 2018 (aged 92); Woodland Hills, Los Angeles, California, U.S.
- Other names: Anne Coates; Anne Coates-Hickox
- Occupation: Film editor
- Years active: 1947–2015
- Spouse: Douglas Hickox (m. 1958, divorced)
- Children: 3
- Relatives: John Coates (brother)
- Awards: Academy Award for Best Film Editing; 1963 Lawrence of Arabia; American Cinema Editors; 1995 Career Achievement Award; 2016; Academy Honorary Award

Anne Voase Coates OBE (12 December 1925 – 8 May 2018) was an English film editor with a more than 60-year-long career. She was perhaps best known as the editor of David Lean's epic film Lawrence of Arabia (1962), for which she won the Academy Award for Best Film Editing. She was also Oscar-nominated for Becket (1963), The Elephant Man (1980), In the Line of Fire (1993) and Out of Sight (1998). In 2007, she became a BAFTA Fellow.

== Early life and education ==
Coates was born in Reigate, Surrey, England, the daughter of Kathleen Voase (née Rank) and Major Laurence Calvert Coates. Her first passion was horses. As a girl, she thought she might become a race-horse trainer.

Coates attended the Reigate village school called the Micklefield School. She then attended High Trees School in Horley (Surrey). Her final school was Bartrum Gables in Broadstairs (Kent).

Before becoming a film editor, she worked as a nurse at Sir Archibald McIndoe's pioneering plastic surgery hospital in East Grinstead, England.

== Career ==
Coates became interested in cinema after seeing Wuthering Heights (1939) directed by William Wyler. She decided to pursue film directing and started working as an assistant at a production company specializing in religious films (also doing projectionist and sound recording work). There she fixed film prints of religious short films before sending them to various British church tours. This splicing work eventually led to the rare job as an assistant film editor at Pinewood Studios, where she worked on various films. Her first experience was assisting for film editor Reggie Mills.

Coates later worked with film director David Lean on Lawrence of Arabia. She had a long and varied career, and continued to edit films, including Out of Sight and Erin Brockovich (both for Steven Soderbergh). Coates was a member of both the Guild of British Film and Television Editors (GBFTE) and American Cinema Editors (ACE).

Variety's Eileen Kowalski noted "many of the editorial greats have been women: Margaret Booth, Dede Allen, Verna Fields, Thelma Schoonmaker, Anne V. Coates and Dorothy Spencer."

== Style and recognition ==
In an industry where women accounted for only 16 per cent of all editors working on the top 250 films of 2004, and 80 per cent of the films had absolutely no women on their editing teams at all, Coates thrived as a top film editor. She was awarded BAFTA's highest honour, a BAFTA Fellowship, in February 2007 and was given an Academy Honorary Award, which are popularly known as a Lifetime Achievement Oscar, in November 2016 by the Academy of Motion Picture Arts and Sciences.

Over the course of her career she has stated her style as being:

- "In a way, I've never looked at myself as a woman in the business. I've just looked at myself as an editor. I mean, I'm sure I've been turned down because I'm a woman, but then other times I've been used because they wanted a woman editor."
- "...I guess I've been lucky that most of the time I've been in the same direction as the director. I try to work with directors whose work I like and find interesting. When I was younger, I had to find work where I could, and I had some not great experiences with directors."
- "You have the courage of your convictions. When you're editing you have to make thousands of decisions every day and if you dither over them all the time, you'll never get anything done."
- "I seem to get the rhythm from the performances. I like to feel I'm very much an actor's editor. I look very much to the performances and cut very much for performances rather than the action. I think that's important, what's in the eyes of the actor."

== Personal life ==
=== Marriage and family ===
Coates was at the centre of a film industry family. Besides being the niece of J. Arthur Rank, she was married to the director Douglas Hickox for many years. Her brother, John Coates, was a producer (The Snowman and Yellow Submarine). Her sons, Anthony Hickox (1959-2023) and James Hickox (b. 1965) were film directors. Her daughter Emma E. Hickox (b. 1964) is a film editor.

=== Death ===
Coates died on 8 May 2018, aged 92, at the Motion Picture Country Home and Hospital, Woodland Hills, Los Angeles, California, United States.

== Filmography ==
=== Film ===
Year	Title	Director	Notes	Ref.
1952	The Pickwick Papers	Noel Langley		
1953	Grand National Night	Bob McNaught		
1954	Forbidden Cargo	Harold French		
1955	To Paris with Love	Robert Hamer		
1956	Lost	Guy Green		
1957	The Truth About Women	Muriel Box		
1958	The Horse's Mouth	Ronald Neame		
1960	Tunes of Glory	Ronald Neame		
1961	Don't Bother to Knock	Cyril Frankel		
1962	Lawrence of Arabia	David Lean		
1964	Becket	Peter Glenville		
1965	Young Cassidy	Jack Cardiff		
1965	Those Magnificent Men in Their Flying Machines	Ken Annakin	with Gordon Stone	
1966	Hotel Paradiso	Peter Glenville		
1968	Great Catherine	Gordon Flemyng		
1970	The Adventurers	Lewis Gilbert		
1971	Friends	Lewis Gilbert		
1972	Follow Me!	Carol Reed		
1973	Bequest to the Nation	James Cellan Jones		
1974	11 Harrowhouse	Aram Avakian		
1974	Murder on the Orient Express	Sidney Lumet		
1975	Man Friday	Jack Gold		
1976	Aces High	Jack Gold		
1976	The Eagle Has Landed	John Sturges		
1978	The Legacy	Richard Marquand		
1980	The Elephant Man	David Lynch		
1981	The Bushido Blade	Tom Kotani	Supervising editor	
1981	Ragtime	Milos Forman	with Antony Gibbs and Stanley Warnow	
1983	The Pirates of Penzance	Wilford Leach		
1984	Greystoke: The Legend of Tarzan, Lord of the Apes	Hugh Hudson		
1986	Lady Jane	Trevor Nunn		
1986	Raw Deal	John Irvin		
1987	Masters of the Universe	Gary Goddard		
1989	Farewell to the King	John Milius	with Carroll Timothy O'Meara	
1989	Listen to Me	Douglas Day Stewart	with Bud S. Smith	
1990	I Love You to Death	Lawrence Kasdan		
1991	What About Bob?	Frank Oz		
1992	Chaplin	Richard Attenborough		
1993	In the Line of Fire	Wolfgang Petersen		
1994	Pontiac Moon	Peter Medak		
1995	Congo	Frank Marshall		
1996	Striptease	Andrew Bergman		
1997	Out to Sea	Martha Coolidge		
1998	Out of Sight	Steven Soderbergh		
2000	Erin Brockovich	Steven Soderbergh		
2000	Passion of Mind	Alain Berliner		
2001	Sweet November	Pat O'Connor		
2002	Unfaithful	Adrian Lyne		
2004	Taking Lives	D.J. Caruso		
2006	Catch and Release	Susannah Grant		
2007	The Golden Compass	Chris Weitz	with Peter Honess and Kevin Tent	
2010	Extraordinary Measures	Tom Vaughan		
2015	Fifty Shades of Grey	Sam Taylor-Johnson	with Debra Neil-Fisher and Lisa Gunning	

=== Television ===
Year	Title	Notes	Ref.
1972	A War of Children	TV movie	
1973	ITV Saturday Night Theatre	Episode: "Catholics"	
2000	Fail Safe	TV movie	

== Awards and nominations ==
Institution	Year	Category	Project	Result	Ref.
Academy Awards	1963	Best Film Editing	Lawrence of Arabia	Won	
Academy Awards	1965	Best Film Editing	Becket	Nominated	
Academy Awards	1981	Best Film Editing	The Elephant Man	Nominated	
Academy Awards	1994	Best Film Editing	In the Line of Fire	Nominated	
Academy Awards	1999	Best Film Editing	Out of Sight	Nominated	
Academy Awards	2017	Academy Honorary Award		Honored	
British Academy Film Awards	1975	Best Editing	Murder on the Orient Express	Nominated	
British Academy Film Awards	1981	Best Editing	The Elephant Man	Nominated	
British Academy Film Awards	1994	Best Editing	In the Line of Fire	Nominated	
British Academy Film Awards	2001	Best Editing	Erin Brockovich	Nominated	
British Academy Film Awards	2007	BAFTA Fellowship		Honored	
American Cinema Editors	1963	Best Edited Feature Film	Lawrence of Arabia	Nominated	
American Cinema Editors	1965	Best Edited Feature Film	Becket	Nominated	
American Cinema Editors	1994	Best Edited Feature Film	In the Line of Fire	Nominated	
American Cinema Editors	1995	Career Achievement Award		Honored	
American Cinema Editors	1998	Best Edited Feature Film	Out of Sight	Nominated	
Los Angeles Film Critics Association	2015	Career Achievement Award		Honored	
Online Film Critics Society	1999	Best Film Editing	Out of Sight	Nominated	
Women in Film Crystal Award	1997	International Award		Honored	

=== Best-of lists ===
In 2012, the Motion Picture Editors Guild ranked Lawrence of Arabia (1962) and Out of Sight (1998) among the best-edited films of all time.
