= Sam O'Steen =

American film editor and director (1923–2000)

- Born: Samuel Alexander O'Steen; November 6, 1923; Paragould, Arkansas, U.S.
- Died: October 11, 2000 (aged 76); Atlantic City, New Jersey, U.S.
- Occupation: Film editor
- Years active: 1960–2000
- Children: 4
- Awards: BAFTA Award for Best Editing (1968) The Graduate

Samuel Alexander O'Steen (November 6, 1923 – October 11, 2000) was an American film editor and director. He had an extended, notable collaboration with the director Mike Nichols, with whom he edited 12 films between 1966 and 1994. Among the films O'Steen edited are Who's Afraid of Virginia Woolf (directed by Nichols, 1966), Cool Hand Luke (directed by Stuart Rosenberg, 1967), The Graduate (directed by Nichols, 1967), Rosemary's Baby (directed by Roman Polanski, 1968), and Chinatown (directed by Polanski, 1974).

On a 2012 listing of the 75 best-edited films of all time compiled by the Motion Picture Editors Guild based on a survey of its members, both The Graduate and Chinatown appear, Chinatown listed 31st and The Graduate 52nd.

== Life and career ==
O'Steen was born in Paragould, Arkansas but raised in California. As a child in Burbank, he would try to make it onto the Warner Bros. lot hoping it could be an entree to work in the editing room. He was finally able to secure a position as an assistant editor in 1956, when he became George Tomasini's assistant editor on Alfred Hitchcock's 1957 film The Wrong Man.

As was typical at the time, he served as an assistant editor at Warner Bros. for eight years; his first credit as editor was on Youngblood Hawke (1964), which was directed by Delmer Daves.

Within a year, O'Steen had become the editor on Mike Nichols' first film as a director, Who's Afraid of Virginia Woolf?. O'Steen was Nichols' principal editor for nearly thirty years, during which he edited twelve of Nichols' films; their last film together was Wolf (1994).

O'Steen had been working as a principal editor for only three years when he edited Nichols' second film, The Graduate, but Patrick J. Sauer considers this film to be the epitome of O'Steen's editing:

Nowhere are O'Steen's skills more apparent than in Dustin Hoffman's classic debut film, The Graduate. O'Steen gives the audience time to study the performer's face before cutting the scene. O'Steen allows for long, personal looks at Hoffman's facial expressions to give the viewers an idea of what the character is thinking instead of the "quick-cutting" seen so often in modern films. In The Graduate Hoffman's expressions at the party scene are as important to the character as any bit of dialogue and O'Steen does not cut the scene short.

In his volume from the History of American Cinema series, Paul Monaco emphasizes the innovative aspects of the editing of The Graduate:

...with The Graduate, both Nichols and O'Steen had an opportunity to push their collaboration in the direction of a more innovative editing style. For example, one sequence in the film begins with the recent college graduate Benjamin (Dustin Hoffman) floating on an air mattress in his parents' swimming pool. As he leaves the pool to walk back into their house, the scene cuts smoothly to a room where Benjamin is meeting an older woman ... for clandestine sex. Over the next couple of minutes through continuous editing the scenes shift back and forth between his parents' home pool and Benjamin's mental projections of his meetings with Mrs. Robinson. ... This associational montage shows adeptness of the editing technique and reinforces the inner sense of Benjamin's feelings of alienation and ambivalence ...

Cover of Sam O'Steen's memoir Cut to the Chase: Forty-Five Years of Editing America's Favorite Movies.

O'Steen directed seven films for television in the 1970s and 1980s, most notably Queen of the Stardust Ballroom (1975) and Kids Don't Tell (1985). He also directed one feature film, Sparkle (1976). His editing of The Graduate (1967) was honored by a BAFTA Award for Best Editing, and he was nominated for this award again for Chinatown (1974). He was nominated three times for the Academy Award for Best Film Editing, for Who's Afraid of Virginia Woolf (1966), Chinatown (1974), and Silkwood (directed by Mike Nichols, 1983).

In 1976, O'Steen won the "Most Outstanding Television Director" award from the Directors Guild of America (DGA). His film Queen of the Stardust Ballroom won the Outstanding Directorial Achievement Award in the category "Movies for Television and Mini-Series". He was also nominated for an Emmy award for "Outstanding Directing in a Special Program - Drama or Comedy" for his work on Queen of the Stardust Ballroom.

O'Steen was married twice and had four daughters. His memoir, Cut to the Chase: Forty-Five Years of Editing America's Favorite Movies, was published in 2001, shortly after his death. The book is written mostly as a transcript of O'Steen's responses to questions posed by his second wife, Bobbie (Meyer) O'Steen, with sidebars about individual films and filmmakers. Ray Zone characterized it as "one of the very best anecdotal histories of filmmaking in print."

== Filmography (Editor) ==
Year	Film	Director	Other notes
1964	Youngblood Hawke	Delmer Daves	
1964	Robin and the 7 Hoods	Gordon Douglas	
1964	Kisses for My President	Curtis Bernhardt	
1965	None but the Brave	Frank Sinatra	
1965	Marriage on the Rocks	Jack Donohue	
1966	Who's Afraid of Virginia Woolf?	Mike Nichols	(nominated) Academy Award for Film Editing
1967	Hotel	Richard Quine	
1967	Cool Hand Luke	Stuart Rosenberg	
1967	The Graduate	Mike Nichols	BAFTA Award for Best Editing
1968	Rosemary's Baby	Roman Polanski	
1969	The Sterile Cuckoo	Alan J. Pakula	
1970	Catch-22	Mike Nichols	
1971	Carnal Knowledge	Mike Nichols	
1972	Portnoy's Complaint	Ernest Lehman	
1973	The Day of the Dolphin	Mike Nichols	
1974	Chinatown	Roman Polanski	(nominated) BAFTA and Academy Awards for Best Editing
1976	Sparkle	Sam O'Steen	
1978	Straight Time	Ulu Grosbard	
1979	Hurricane	Jan Troell	
1982	Amityville II: The Possession	Damiano Damiani	
1983	Silkwood	Mike Nichols	(nominated) Academy Award for Film Editing
1986	Heartburn	Mike Nichols	
1987	Nadine	Robert Benton	
1988	Frantic	Roman Polanski	
1988	Biloxi Blues	Mike Nichols	
1988	Working Girl	Mike Nichols	
1989	A Dry White Season	Euzhan Palcy	
1990	Postcards from the Edge	Mike Nichols	
1991	Regarding Henry	Mike Nichols	
1992	Consenting Adults	Alan J. Pakula	
1994	Wolf	Mike Nichols	
1996	Night Falls on Manhattan	Sidney Lumet	
1999	The White River Kid	Arne Glimcher	

== See also ==
- List of film director and editor collaborations
