= The Interpreter (2005 film) =

2005 film directed by Sydney Pollack

- Theatrical release poster
- Directed by: Sydney Pollack
- Screenplay by: Charles Randolph; Scott Frank; Steven Zaillian
- Story by: Martin Stellman; Brian Ward
- Produced by: Tim Bevan; Eric Fellner; Kevin Misher
- Starring: Nicole Kidman; Sean Penn; Catherine Keener
- Cinematography: Darius Khondji
- Edited by: William Steinkamp
- Music by: James Newton Howard
- Production companies: Working Title Films; StudioCanal; Mirage Enterprises
- Distributed by: Universal Pictures; (International); Mars Distribution; (France)
- Release dates: 4 April 2005 (Sydney); 15 April 2005 (United Kingdom); 22 April 2005 (United States)
- Running time: 128 minutes
- Countries: France; Germany; United Kingdom; United States
- Language: English
- Budget: $80 million
- Box office: $162.9 million

The Interpreter is a 2005 political thriller film directed by Sydney Pollack, starring Nicole Kidman, Sean Penn, Catherine Keener, and Jesper Christensen. It was the first film shot inside the United Nations Headquarters.

Having inadvertently overheard an assassination plot spoken in the language of her southern African country, United Nations interpreter Silvia Bloome is put under Secret Service protection for President Zuwanie's visit.

An international co-production between the United States, United Kingdom, Germany, and France, the film was released in all four countries in April 2005. It received mixed reviews from critics and grossed $162 million against its $80 million budget.

== Plot ==
In the fictional Southern African country of Matobo, rebel leader Ajene Xola drives two men, Simon Broome and Philippe, to an abandoned stadium. They discuss how President Edmond Zuwanie's regime has ruthlessly exterminated most of the population and intimidated the survivors into silence. Upon their arrival at the stadium, they find three schoolboys, who point Xola and Simon in the direction of corpses left by Zuwanie's security apparatus, while Philippe stays in the car. When Xola and Simon return to the playing field, they are executed by the boys whose actions connect them to Zuwanie's secret police. Philippe clambers out of the car and hides, taking pictures of a car arriving carrying Zuwanie's lackeys, and then escapes.

Simon's sister, Silvia, works at the United Nations Interpretation Service in New York. A white African born in the United States to a British mother and white Matoban father, she was raised in Matobo and studied in France. Her diverse background leads to UN Security Chief Lee Wu wryly describing her as "being the UN".

The UN is considering indicting Zuwanie, to stand trial in the International Criminal Court. Initially a liberator, over the past 20 years he has become as corrupt and tyrannical as the government he overthrew, and is now responsible for ethnic cleansing. Zuwanie is soon to visit the UN and put forward his own case to the UN General Assembly, in an attempt to avoid the indictment.

A random security scare forces the evacuation of the UN headquarters. When Silvia returns at night to retrieve some personal belongings, she overhears two men discussing an assassination plot in Ku (the Matoban lingua franca). She runs from the building when the men become aware of her presence. The next day, while interpreting in a meeting, Silvia recognizes words from the phrases she overheard the night before. She reports the incident to UN security; the plot's target appears to be Zuwanie.

The US Secret Service assigns Dignitary Protection Division (DPD) agents Tobin Keller and Dot Woods to investigate, as well as protect Zuwanie when he arrives. Zuwanie's personal head of security, former Dutch mercenary Nils Lud, arrives in New York. Keller, whose estranged wife was killed in a car accident just weeks earlier, learns Silvia's parents and sister were killed by landmines laid by Zuwanie's men in the past, and that she has dated Xola. Although Keller is suspicious of Silvia's backstory, the two grow close, in part because of their shared grief, and Keller ends up protecting her from attacks.

Philippe calls Silvia to meet and informs her of Xola's death, but lies and says he does not know what happened to Simon. She attempts to obtain information by way of Kuman-Kuman, an exiled Matoban minister living in New York, only to almost be killed in a bus bombing perpetrated by Lud's right-hand man, Jean Gamba; Kuman-Kuman, along with Keller's subordinate Doug, are amongst the dead. The media report that Xola – who no one knows Zuwanie has already had assassinated – is behind the bombing.

Philippe is found dead in his hotel room, and Silvia finds out that Simon was killed along with Xola. She narrowly avoids an assassination attempt by Gamba (whom Keller kills) and leaves a voicemail on Keller's phone saying she is going back home. Keller takes this to mean she is returning to Matobo and dispatches an agent to intercept her at JFK Airport.

The purported assassin is "discovered" by Lud, who shoots him while Zuwanie is in the middle of his address to the General Assembly, and security personnel rush Zuwanie to a safe room for his protection. Keller intercepts Lud and has him arrested, realizing that the assassination plot is a false flag operation created by Zuwanie to gain credibility that his rivals are terrorists and to deter supporters of his removal.

Meanwhile, Silvia hides in the safe room. When Zuwanie arrives, she confronts him, intending to kill him herself. Keller realizes that for Silvia "returning home" means going to the UN, and rushes to the safe room, just in time to prevent her from shooting Zuwanie. Zuwanie is indicted, and Silvia reconciles with Keller before leaving for Matobo.

== Cast ==
- Nicole Kidman as Silvia Broome
- Sean Penn as Tobin Keller
- Catherine Keener as Dot Woods, Secret Service
- Jesper Christensen as Nils Lud, Zuwanie's head of security
- Yvan Attal as Philippe, a French family friend of the Broomes
- Michael Wright as Marcus, Matoban consular service
- Earl Cameron as Zuwanie, President of Matobo
- George Harris as Kuman-Kuman, an exiled Matoban minister
- Tsai Chin as Luan, UN interpreter
- Clyde Kusatsu as Police Chief Lee Wu, UN security
- Eric Keenleyside as Rory Robb, UN security
- Christopher Evan Welch as Jonathan Williams, CIA
- Hugo Speer as Simon Broome
- Maz Jobrani as Mo, Secret Service
- David Zayas as Charlie Russell, Secret Service
- Yusuf Gatewood as Doug, Secret Service
- Curtiss Cook as Ajene Xola
- Sydney Pollack as Jay Pettigrew, Secret Service Supervisor

== Production ==
The Interpreter was shot almost entirely in New York City. The opening sequence was filmed in Mozambique with a support crew made up largely of South African nationals. The name Matobo is that of a national park, Matobo National Park (Matopos) in Matabeleland, Zimbabwe.

=== Filming in UN buildings ===
Scenes were filmed inside the UN General Assembly and Security Council chambers in March 2004, making The Interpreter the first film to shoot at the location. After initial requests to film within the United Nations were denied, and faced with increased production costs to use a constructed set in Toronto, Pollack approached then-Secretary-General Kofi Annan directly, and personally negotiated permission to film inside the UN. Annan, commenting about the permission for The Interpreter, said that:

… the intention was really to do something dignified, something that is honest and reflects the work that this Organization does. And it is with that spirit that the producers and the directors approached their work, and I hope you will all agree they have done that.

The filming took place on weekends, public holidays, or nights so as not to disturb the regular work of the UN, and the set was closed to tourists and UN staff. Ambassadors at the UN had hoped to appear in the film, but actors were asked to play the roles of diplomats. Spain's UN Ambassador Inocencio Arias jokingly complained that his "opportunity to have a nomination for the Oscar next year went away because of some stupid regulation."

=== Matobo and Ku ===
The country "Republic of Matobo" and its corresponding constructed language "Ku" were created for this film. The director of the Centre for African Language Learning in Covent Garden, London, England, Said el-Gheithy, was commissioned in January 2004 to create Ku. It is based on Bantu languages spoken in Eastern and Southern Africa and is a cross between Swahili and Shona, with some unique elements.

In Ku, the film's tagline "The truth requires no translation" is "Angota ho ne njumata".

== Reception ==
=== Box office ===
The Interpreter grossed $72.7 million in the United States and Canada, and $90.2 million in other territories, for a worldwide total of $162.9 million, against a budget of $80 million. It opened at No. 1 for its first weekend domestically, spending six weeks in the Top 10 at the box office.

=== Critical response ===
On the review aggregator website Rotten Tomatoes, 57% of 190 critics' reviews are positive, with an average rating of 6.0/10. The website's consensus reads: "A polished and intelligent thriller, though marred by plot implausibilities." Metacritic, which uses a weighted average, assigned the film a score of 62 out of 100, based on 41 critics, indicating "generally favorable" reviews. Audiences polled by CinemaScore gave the film an average grade of "B" on an A+ to F scale.

Kirk Honeycutt of The Hollywood Reporter wrote: "Thrillers don't get much smarter than The Interpreter." Todd McCarthy of Variety described it as "coolly absorbing without being pulse-quickening."

== Awards ==
In 2005, the Los Angeles Film Critics Association awarded Catherine Keener as Best Supporting Actress for her performances in several films, including The Interpreter.

=== Controversy in Zimbabwe ===
Upon The Interpreter's release in Zimbabwe, that country's Minister of Information and Publicity, Chen Chimutengwende, accused the film of promoting anti-government propaganda. Chimutengwende claimed that Matobo and the fictional Edmond Zuwanie were thinly veiled caricatures of Zimbabwe and then-President Robert Mugabe, and insisted it was part of an international smear campaign being launched against the Mugabe regime by the United States. Tafataona Mahoso, chairman of the Zimbabwean state's Media and Information Commission, also attacked The Interpreter, claiming it was "typical of US Cold War propaganda". Nevertheless, the Zimbabwe Media Censorship Board found nothing objectionable in the film and approved it for theatrical and video release.
