= Out of Africa (film) =

1985 film by Sydney Pollack

- Theatrical release poster
- Directed by: Sydney Pollack
- Screenplay by: Kurt Luedtke
- Based on: Out of Africa 1937 novel by Isak Dinesen; Isak Dinesen: The Life of a Story Teller 1982 story by Judith Thurman; Silence Will Speak 1977 novel by Errol Trzebinski
- Produced by: Sydney Pollack; Kim Jorgensen
- Starring: Robert Redford; Meryl Streep; Klaus Maria Brandauer
- Cinematography: David Watkin
- Edited by: Fredric Steinkamp; William Steinkamp; Pembroke Herring; Sheldon Kahn
- Music by: John Barry
- Production company: Mirage Enterprises
- Distributed by: Universal Pictures
- Release date: December 18, 1985
- Running time: 161 minutes
- Country: United States
- Languages: English; Swahili
- Budget: $31 million
- Box office: $227.5 million

Out of Africa is a 1985 American epic romantic drama film directed and produced by Sydney Pollack, and starring Meryl Streep and Robert Redford. The film is based loosely on the 1937 autobiographical book Out of Africa written by Isak Dinesen (the pseudonym of Danish author Karen Blixen), with additional material from Dinesen's 1960 book Shadows on the Grass and other sources.

The book was adapted into a screenplay by Kurt Luedtke, and this screenplay was filmed in 1984. Streep played Karen Blixen, Redford played Denys Finch Hatton, and Klaus Maria Brandauer played Baron Bror Blixen. Others in the film include Michael Kitchen as Berkeley Cole, Malick Bowens as Farah, Stephen Kinyanjui as the Chief, Michael Gough as Lord Delamere, Suzanna Hamilton as Felicity, and the model and actress Iman as Mariammo. The film received generally positive reviews from critics. It was also a commercial success and won seven Academy Awards including Best Picture and Best Director for Pollack.

== Plot ==
In 1913, after being turned down by a Swedish nobleman, Danish aristocrat Karen Dinesen suggests a marriage of convenience to the nobleman's brother, Baron Bror Blixen. They plan to move to Nairobi, British East Africa, where Bror intends to invest Karen's money in a dairy farm. She will join him a few months later, and they will get married. On her way to Nairobi, Karen's train is stopped by big-game hunter Denys Finch Hatton, who knows Bror and entrusts her with his ivory haul. Farah, a Somali headman employed by Bror, greets Karen at the railway station and escorts her to the Muthaiga Club to meet her future husband, but is barred from the men's only establishment.

When Karen and Bror marry, she becomes Baroness Blixen. Bror has changed their plan and instead bought a coffee farm that is at too high an elevation to be productive. Bror is more interested in guiding hunting safaris than helping run the farm. Karen comes to love Africa and looking after the Kikuyu people who live on her land. She establishes a school, helps with their medical needs, and arbitrates their disputes. Attempting to build a formal European homelife on par with that of nearby upper-class colonists, she befriends a young woman, Felicity. (Note: Her character is based on a young Beryl Markham.)

As World War I approaches East Africa, colonists form a militia led by colonial patriarch Lord Delamere, which includes Denys and Bror. A military expedition searches for forces from the neighboring German colony of German East Africa. Responding to the militia's need for supplies, Karen leads a long, exhausting expedition to find them and returns safely. Karen contracts syphilis from Bror, then goes back to Denmark for treatment and recovery while Bror manages the farm in her absence. After Karen's return, she lives apart from Bror, realizing he is still a womanizer. He resumes his safari work.

A relationship between Karen and Denys develops after a tentative kiss at a New Year's party leads to them moving in together while he travels. Denys buys a Gipsy Moth biplane and often takes Karen flying. When Bror asks for a divorce to marry another wealthy woman, Karen asks Denys to make their relationship official. He refuses, preferring the independence of the status quo. Karen drifts further apart from Denys after confronting him about plans to take Felicity on a private safari. He assures her he wants only her, but marriage does not matter to him.

The farm loses a good harvest to fire, forcing Karen to sell out. Before leaving Kenya for Denmark, she appeals to the incoming governor to provide land for her Kikuyu workers, then sells her possessions at a rummage sale. Denys visits the now-empty house, no longer comfortable being alone, and admits his feelings for her have changed. He asks to join her on her journey back. Denys departs for a safari scouting trip, promising to fly Karen to Mombasa upon his return. Soon after, Bror informs Karen that Denys' plane has crashed in Tsavo. Karen organizes his funeral and recites an excerpt from an A. E. Housman poem about a celebrated athlete who, like Denys, was not meant to grow old.

Karen visits the Muthaiga Club to arrange for her mail to be forwarded. The members, having come to respect her, invite her into the men-only salon for a toast. Karen gives Farah the compass Denys had given her and asks him to say her name so she can hear his voice one last time. Later, Farah writes to Karen, telling her that a pair of lions often visits Denys's grave.

An epilogue reveals that Karen published several books under the pen name Isak Dinesen, and never returned to Africa.

== Cast ==
- Robert Redford as Denys Finch Hatton
- Meryl Streep as Karen Blixen
- Klaus Maria Brandauer as Bror and Hans von Blixen-Finecke
- Michael Kitchen as Berkeley Cole
- Shane Rimmer as Belknap
- Malick Bowens as Farah Aden
- Joseph Thiaka as Kamante
- Stephen Kinyanjui as Chief Kinanjui
- Michael Gough as Hugh Cholmondeley, Lord Delamere
- Suzanna Hamilton as Felicity Spurway
- Rachel Kempson as Sarah, Lady Belfield
- Graham Crowden as Henry, Lord Belfield
- Leslie Phillips as Sir Joseph Aloysius Byrne
- Annabel Maule as Lady Byrne
- Donal McCann as Doctor in Nairobi
- Benny Young as Minister
- Iman as Mariammo
- Job Seda as Kanuthia

== Production ==
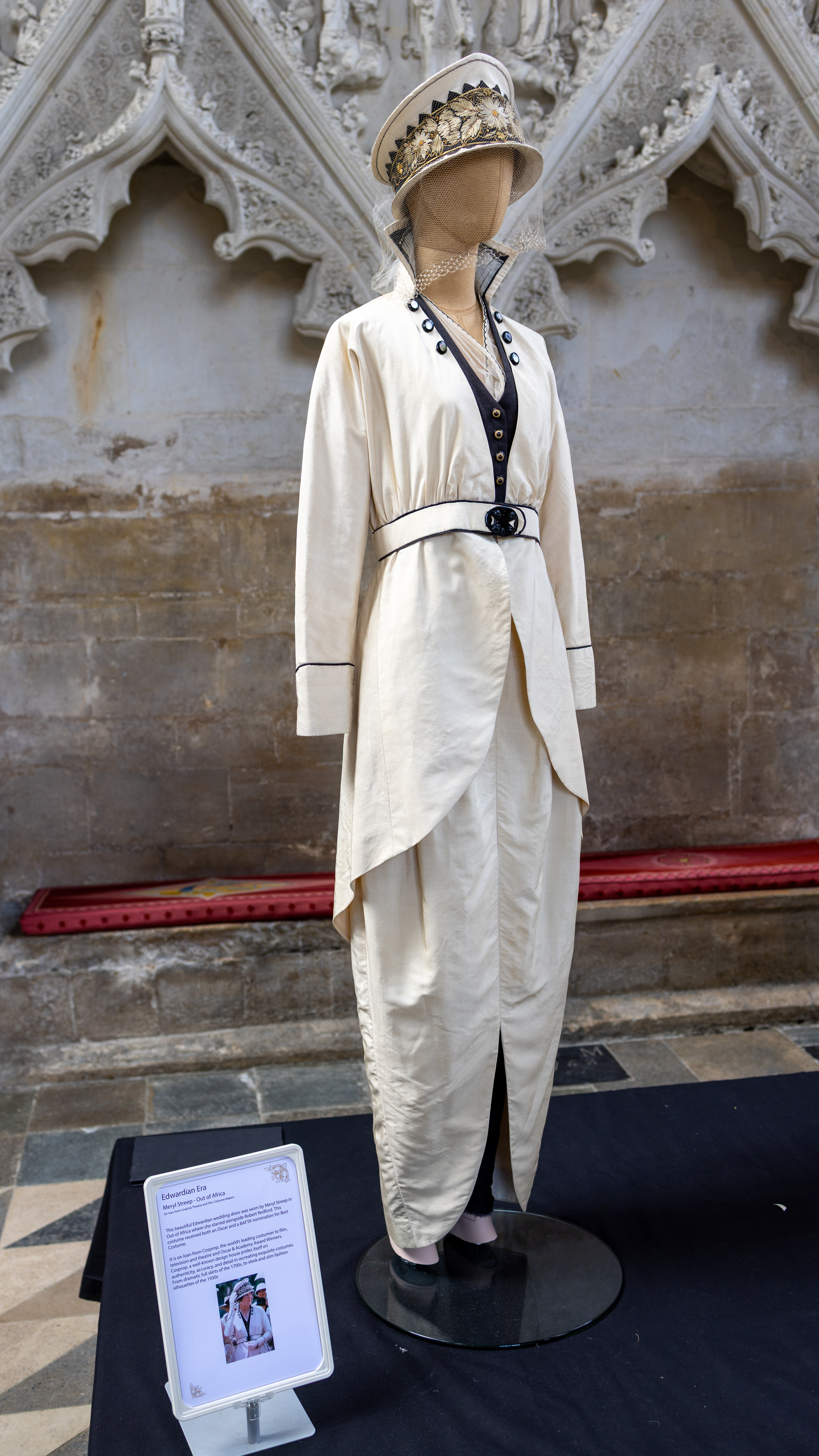
Wedding dress worn by Meryl Streep in the film

The film tells the story as a series of six loosely coupled episodes from Karen's life, intercut with her narration. The final two narrations, the first a reflection on Karen's experiences in Kenya and the second a description of Finch Hatton's grave, were taken from her book Out of Africa, while the others were written for the film in imitation of her very lyrical writing style. The pace of this film is often rather slow, reflecting Blixen's book, "Natives dislike speed, as we dislike noise..."

Klaus Maria Brandauer was director Sydney Pollack's only choice for Bror Blixen, causing problems finding a replacement when it appeared that Brandauer's schedule would prevent him from participating. Jeremy Irons was considered for the role of Finch Hatton but Robert Redford was cast instead, with Pollack thinking Redford had a charm no British actor could convey. Audrey Hepburn was Pollack's first choice but Meryl Streep landed the part by showing up for her meeting with the director wearing a low-cut blouse and a push-up bra, as Pollack had originally thought the actress did not have enough sex appeal for the role.

Out of Africa was filmed using descendants of several people of the Kikuyu tribe who are named in the book, including the grandson of chief Kinyanjui who played his grandfather. Much of it was filmed in the Karen / Lang'ata area near the actual Ngong Hills outside Nairobi. The Chyulu Hills stood in for the less picturesque Ngong Hills. As Karen's farmhouse was at the time of filming a part of a local nursing school, the filming took place in her nearby first house "Mbogani", which is a dairy today. Her actual house, known as "Mbagathi" is now the Karen Blixen Museum. A substantial part of the filming took place in the Scott house and in a recreation of 1910s Nairobi built in an area of unoccupied land in Langata.

The scenes depicting the Government House were shot at Nairobi School with the administration block providing a close replica of British colonial governors' residences. The train sequences were filmed along a section of abandoned track between Gilgil and Thompsons Falls some 97 km (60 mi) north west of Nairobi. The steam locomotive, taken from display in the Nairobi Railway Museum was non functional, therefore a diesel locomotive was hidden inside a box car behind the steam locomotive and the diesel pushed the train along while steam and smoke effects were provided. The scenes set in early 20th-century rural Denmark were filmed at Castle Rising, near King's Lynn, England. The historic castle was visually adapted to represent a Danish counterpart, providing the backdrop for Karen Blixen's return home for medical treatment following her illness in Kenya.

== Historical differences ==
Although bearing the name of Dinesen's book, the picture was actually taken from two other books (not written by her) as well. It quotes the start of the Dinesen's book, "I had a farm in Africa, at the foot of the Ngong Hills", and Karen recites, "He prayeth well, who loveth well both man and bird and beast" from The Rime of the Ancient Mariner, which becomes the epitaph inscribed on Finch Hatton's grave marker.

The film omits much of Dinesen's book, such as a devastating locust swarm, some local shootings, and her writings about the German army. The production also plays down the size of her 4,000 acres (16 km^{2}) farm, which had 800 Kikuyu workers and an 18-oxen wagon. Scenes show Karen as owning only one dog, but actually, she had two similar dogs named Dawn and Dusk.

The movie also takes liberties with Denys and Karen's romance. They met at a hunting club, not in the plains. Denys was away from Kenya for two years on military assignment in Egypt, which is not mentioned. Denys took up flying and began to lead safaris after he moved in with Karen. The film also ignores that Karen was pregnant at least once with Finch Hatton's child but suffered from miscarriages. Furthermore, Denys was an English aristocrat and son of 13th Earl of Winchilsea, but this fact was minimized by the hiring of the actor Robert Redford, an inarguably all-American actor who had previously worked with Pollack. When Redford accepted the contract to play, he did so fully intending to play him as an Englishman. Pollack, however, felt an English accent would be distracting for the audience, and told Redford to use his real accent. In fact, Redford reportedly had to re-record some of his lines from early takes in the filming, in which he still spoke with a trace of English accent.

The title scenes of the film show the main railway, from Mombasa to Nairobi, as traveling through the Kenyan Rift Valley, on the steep back side of the actual Ngong Hills. However, the real railway track is located on the higher, opposite side of the Ngong Hills. The passenger car was actually a small combination office/sleeper that was originally used by supervisors during the building of the Uganda Railway and was the actual car from which a man was taken and killed by a marauding lioness (see The Man-eaters of Tsavo).

== Soundtrack ==
Out of Africa

Soundtrack album by John Barry
- Released: 1985 (US) / 1986 (UK)
- Recorded: 1985
- Genre: soundtrack
- Length: 12 at 33:27; 18 at 38:42
- Labels: MCA Records; Varèse Sarabande

The music for Out of Africa was composed and conducted by veteran English composer John Barry. The score included a number of outside pieces such as the second movement Mozart's Clarinet Concerto and African traditional songs. The soundtrack garnered Barry an Oscar for Best Original Score and sits in fifteenth place in the American Film Institute's list of top 25 American film scores. The soundtrack was first released through MCA Records in 1985 and features 12 tracks of score at a running time of just over thirty-three minutes. In 1987, a Special Edition was issued that included the song "The Music of Goodbye (Love Theme)" by Melissa Manchester & Al Jarreau. A rerecording conducted by Joel McNeely and performed by the Royal Scottish National Orchestra was released in 1997 through Varèse Sarabande and features eighteen tracks of score at a running time just under thirty-nine minutes. In 2024 Intrada Records issued a 2-CD expansion containing the full score, alternates, source music and the 1985 soundtrack album.

=== Charts ===
Chart (1986)	Peak position
Australia (Kent Music Report)	29

=== Certifications ===
Region	Certification	Certified units/sales
Australia (ARIA)	Gold	35,000^{^}
France (SNEP)	Gold	100,000^{*}
Spain (Promusicae)	Platinum	100,000^{^}
United Kingdom (BPI)	Silver	60,000^{*}
United States (RIAA)	Gold	500,000^{^}
^{*} Sales figures based on certification alone.^{^} Shipments figures based on certification alone.

== Technical notes ==
In the Director's Notes on the DVD of Pollack's 2005 film The Interpreter, Pollack himself stated that he filmed Out of Africa and his later films of that decade in 1.85:1 widescreen; and that it "...probably was one I should have had in widescreen" (i.e. anamorphic 2.39:1 widescreen). In his director's notes, Pollack stated that prior to the filming of Out of Africa, he made motion pictures exclusively in the anamorphic 2.39:1 widescreen format and style, and that he did not resume the anamorphic 2.39:1 widescreen format, due to the rise of pan and scan which had affected the compositions of many anamorphic movies, until his last movie, The Interpreter, in 2005.

== Release ==
=== Critical reception ===
On review aggregator Rotten Tomatoes, the film holds an approval rating of 62% based on 90 reviews, with an average rating of 6.90/10. The website's critical consensus reads: "Though lensed with stunning cinematography and featuring a pair of winning performances from Meryl Streep and Robert Redford, Out of Africa suffers from excessive length and glacial pacing." Metacritic reports a score of 69 out of 100 based on 18 critics, indicating "generally favorable reviews". Audiences polled by CinemaScore gave the film an average grade of "A" on an A+ to F scale.

Roger Ebert of the Chicago Sun-Times gave the film four stars out of four and called it "one of the great recent epic romances," adding, "What we have here is an old-fashioned, intelligent, thoughtful love story, told with enough care and attention that we really get involved in the passions among the characters." Vincent Canby of The New York Times described it as "a big, physically elaborate but wispy movie" with Redford's character "a total cipher, and a charmless one at that. It's not Mr. Redford's fault. There's no role for him to act." Gene Siskel of the Chicago Tribune gave the film two-and-a-half stars out of four, and declared: "My basic problem with this otherwise sumptuous and well-acted film is that I never was able to accept Redford in character ... He seems distant to the point of distraction. He is not convincing in his period outfits. He looks and acts as if he just walked out of the safari fitting room at Abercrombie & Fitch." David Ansen of Newsweek wrote that the film was "well worth the wait," calling it "a sprawling but always intelligent romantic epic that depicts Karen Blixen's struggles to hold on to both the man and the land she loves and cannot possess."

Sheila Benson of the Los Angeles Times wrote that the film "seems to be just the thing for famished culture mavens at Christmastime. Unfortunately, and through no fault of Meryl Streep, there doesn't seem to be enough electricity generated out there in Africa to power a love story 2½ hours long". Variety found that the film "rarely really comes to life except when Redford is around, which unfortunately is not often in the first hour," but once Streep and Redford get together it becomes "a wonderful romance, probably Redford's best since The Way We Were".

Pauline Kael of The New Yorker described the film as "unsatisfying" and wrote that Streep is "animated in the early scenes; she's amusing when she acts ditsy, and she has some oddly affecting moments. Her character doesn't deepen though, or come to mean more to us, and Redford doesn't give out with anything for her to play against." Paul Attanasio of The Washington Post stated that the film "has little in the way of narrative drive" and "rarely seems more than an elevated form of tourism."

Reviewing the film in 2009, James Berardinelli wrote: "Watching Out of Africa a quarter of a century after its release, it's almost impossible to guess how it won the Oscar for Best Picture ... Sydney Pollack's direction is quietly competent and the acting by Meryl Streep and Robert Redford is top notch. But the lazy story is little more than an ordinary melodrama that simmers without ever reaching a boil. To tell the truth, during the entirety of the movie's nearly three-hour running length, I was more interested in the scenery and Barry's music than I was in the characters."

=== Box office ===
The film was the fifth-highest-grossing film of 1985 in the United States and Canada with a gross of $87 million. It grossed $227.5 million worldwide and was the second highest-grossing film in Germany with a gross of $23 million.

== Accolades ==
Award	Category	Nominee(s)	Result
Academy Awards	Best Picture	Sydney Pollack	Won
Academy Awards	Best Director	Sydney Pollack	Won
Academy Awards	Best Actress	Meryl Streep	Nominated
Academy Awards	Best Supporting Actor	Klaus Maria Brandauer	Nominated
Academy Awards	Best Adapted Screenplay	Kurt Luedtke	Won
Academy Awards	Best Art Direction	Art Direction: Stephen B. Grimes; Set Decoration: Josie MacAvin	Won
Academy Awards	Best Cinematography	David Watkin	Won
Academy Awards	Best Costume Design	Milena Canonero	Nominated
Academy Awards	Best Film Editing	Fredric Steinkamp, William Steinkamp, Pembroke J. Herring, and Sheldon Kahn	Nominated
Academy Awards	Best Original Score	John Barry	Won
Academy Awards	Best Sound	Chris Jenkins, Gary Alexander, Larry Stensvold, and Peter Handford	Won
American Cinema Editors Awards	Best Edited Feature Film	Fredric Steinkamp, William Steinkamp, Pembroke J. Herring, and Sheldon Kahn	Nominated
BMI Film & TV Awards	Film Music Award	John Barry	Won
British Academy Film Awards	Best Actress in a Leading Role	Meryl Streep	Nominated
British Academy Film Awards	Best Actor in a Supporting Role	Klaus Maria Brandauer	Nominated
British Academy Film Awards	Best Adapted Screenplay	Kurt Luedtke	Won
British Academy Film Awards	Best Cinematography	David Watkin	Won
British Academy Film Awards	Best Costume Design	Milena Canonero	Nominated
British Academy Film Awards	Best Original Music	John Barry	Nominated
British Academy Film Awards	Best Sound	Tom McCarthy Jr., Peter Handford, and Chris Jenkins	Won
British Society of Cinematographers Awards	Best Cinematography in a Theatrical Feature Film	David Watkin	Won
César Awards	Best Foreign Film	Sydney Pollack	Nominated
David di Donatello Awards	Best Foreign Film	Sydney Pollack	Won
David di Donatello Awards	Best Foreign Producer	Sydney Pollack	Nominated
David di Donatello Awards	Best Foreign Director	Sydney Pollack	Nominated
David di Donatello Awards	Best Foreign Actor	Robert Redford	Nominated
David di Donatello Awards	Best Foreign Actress	Meryl Streep	Won
David di Donatello Awards	Best Foreign Screenplay	Kurt Luedtke	Nominated
Directors Guild of America Awards	Outstanding Directorial Achievement in Motion Pictures	Sydney Pollack	Nominated
DVD Exclusive Awards	Best DVD Audio Commentary	Sydney Pollack (for the Collector's Edition)	Nominated
Golden Globe Awards	Best Motion Picture – Drama		Won
Golden Globe Awards	Best Actress in a Motion Picture – Drama	Meryl Streep	Nominated
Golden Globe Awards	Best Supporting Actor – Motion Picture	Klaus Maria Brandauer	Won
Golden Globe Awards	Best Director	Sydney Pollack	Nominated
Golden Globe Awards	Best Screenplay	Kurt Luedtke	Nominated
Golden Globe Awards	Best Original Score	John Barry	Won
Golden Screen Awards			Won
Guild of German Art House Cinemas Awards	Foreign Film	Sydney Pollack	Won
Japan Academy Film Prize	Outstanding Foreign Language Film		Nominated
Joseph Plateau Awards	Best Score	John Barry	Won
Kansas City Film Critics Circle Awards	Best Actress	Meryl Streep	Won
Kansas City Film Critics Circle Awards	Best Supporting Actor	Klaus Maria Brandauer	Won
London Critics Circle Film Awards	Special Achievement Award	John Barry	Won
Los Angeles Film Critics Association Awards	Best Film		Runner-up
Los Angeles Film Critics Association Awards	Best Actress	Meryl Streep	Won
Los Angeles Film Critics Association Awards	Best Cinematography	David Watkin	Won
Nastro d'Argento	Best Foreign Director	Sydney Pollack	Won
Nastro d'Argento	Best Foreign Actress	Meryl Streep	Nominated
National Board of Review Awards	Top Ten Films		2nd Place
National Board of Review Awards	Best Supporting Actor	Klaus Maria Brandauer	Won
National Society of Film Critics Awards	Best Supporting Actor	Klaus Maria Brandauer	4th Place
New York Film Critics Circle Awards	Best Film		3rd Place
New York Film Critics Circle Awards	Best Actress	Meryl Streep	2nd Place
New York Film Critics Circle Awards	Best Supporting Actor	Klaus Maria Brandauer	Won
New York Film Critics Circle Awards	Best Cinematographer	David Watkin	Won
Sant Jordi Awards	Best Foreign Actress	Meryl Streep	Nominated
Writers Guild of America Awards	Best Screenplay – Based on Material from Another Medium	Kurt Luedtke	Nominated

American Film Institute lists:

- 2002 AFI's 100 Years... 100 Passions #13
- 2005 AFI's 100 Years of Film Scores #15
