= Scent of a Woman (1992 film) =

1992 film by Martin Brest

- Theatrical release poster
- Directed by: Martin Brest
- Screenplay by: Bo Goldman
- Based on: Il buio e il miele 1974 novel by Giovanni Arpino
- Suggested by: Character from Profumo di donna by Dino Risi
- Produced by: Martin Brest
- Starring: Al Pacino; Chris O'Donnell
- Cinematography: Donald E. Thorin
- Edited by: William Steinkamp; Michael Tronick; Harvey Rosenstock
- Music by: Thomas Newman
- Production company: City Light Films
- Distributed by: Universal Pictures
- Release date: December 23, 1992
- Running time: 156 minutes
- Country: United States
- Language: English
- Budget: $31 million
- Box office: $134.1 million

Scent of a Woman is a 1992 American drama film produced and directed by Martin Brest that tells the story of a preparatory school student who takes a short-term job near Thanksgiving as a companion and assistant to a retired Army lieutenant colonel who is blind, depressed and irritable. The film was adapted by Bo Goldman from the Italian novel Il buio e il miele (Italian: Darkness and Honey) by Giovanni Arpino. This was previously adapted by Dino Risi for his 1974 Italian film Profumo di donna.

The American film stars Al Pacino and Chris O'Donnell, with James Rebhorn, Philip Seymour Hoffman, Gabrielle Anwar and Bradley Whitford in supporting roles. The film was shot primarily around New York State, and on location at Princeton University in New Jersey. Scenes were shot at the Emma Willard School, an all-girls school in Troy, New York; as well as at the Waldorf-Astoria Hotel and the Fieldston School in New York City.

The film had a limited theatrical release on December 23, 1992 by Universal Pictures, expanding nationwide on January 8, 1993. It received generally positive responses from critics and was a box-office success. Pacino won the Academy Award for Best Actor for his performance and the film was also nominated for Best Picture, Best Director and Best Screenplay Based on Material Previously Produced or Published. The film won three Golden Globe Awards, for Best Screenplay, Best Actor, and Best Motion Picture – Drama.

== Plot ==
Charlie Simms is a scholarship student at Baird, an exclusive New England preparatory school. Karen Rossi hires him to watch her uncle, retired Army Lieutenant Colonel Frank Slade, during Thanksgiving weekend. Charlie accepts so he can buy a plane ticket home to Gresham, Oregon for Christmas. He meets Frank, a highly decorated, blind Vietnam War veteran who has become a cantankerous and cynical alcoholic.

Charlie and student George Willis Jr. witness three classmates set up a prank to humiliate the headmaster, Mr. Trask, by dousing his prized automobile, a Jaguar XJS, with flour and water. Afterward, Trask learns of the witnesses and unsuccessfully presses them to name the perpetrators. He privately offers Charlie virtually guaranteed acceptance to Harvard University if he informs on the other students. Trask schedules a meeting of the school disciplinary committee to take place on the Monday after the Thanksgiving weekend.

Frank Slade unexpectedly takes Charlie on a trip to New York City and arranges their stay at the Waldorf-Astoria hotel. During dinner in the Oak Room at the Plaza Hotel, Frank reveals that the goals of his trip are to stay at a luxurious hotel, enjoy good food and wine, visit his older brother, and have sex with a "terrific" woman. Afterward, he intends to die by suicide.

On Thanksgiving Day, they visit Frank's brother at his home in White Plains. Frank provokes everyone at dinner, which ends in a confrontation with his nephew Randy, who reveals that Frank was not blinded heroically in combat, but in an accident that occurred when he drunkenly juggled live grenades to show off for a group of younger officers. Frank assaults Randy for repeatedly calling Charlie "Chucky", a name Charlie despises, revealing Frank's growing affection for Charlie.

As they return to the city, Charlie mentions his problem at school. Frank advises he turn informant, warning that George will probably submit to Trask's pressure, so he should act first so he can attend Harvard. While at The Pierre's Cotillion Ballroom, Frank identifies the scent (Ogleby Sisters soap) of a young woman waiting for her date. He introduces himself and offers to teach her the tango. The evening ends with Frank having sex with a high-class escort, completing the stated objectives of his trip.

Despondent the next morning, Frank is uninterested in any suggestions for the day until Charlie brings up going for a car ride. Frank talks a Ferrari salesman into letting them take a convertible for a test ride. When on the road, Frank becomes depressed again until Charlie allows him to drive. When they are pulled over by a policeman, Frank convinces the officer to let them go without revealing that he is blind.

After returning the car, Frank again becomes despondent. He jaywalks into rushing traffic on Park Avenue and narrowly escapes being struck by multiple cars. When they return to the hotel, Frank sends Charlie to buy cigars. Charlie leaves but becomes suspicious and returns to find Frank donning his dress uniform and preparing to end his life with his service pistol. They scuffle briefly and Frank breaks down. He backs down after Charlie convinces him that he has much to live for and should courageously face his circumstances.

On Monday morning, Charlie and George appear before the Baird disciplinary committee with the whole student body in attendance. Frank unexpectedly arrives and sits with Charlie. George Jr. provides tentative identifications but claims he was not wearing his contact lenses, so he cannot be positive.

Charlie refuses to confirm George Jr.'s identification, so Trask recommends his expulsion. Frank gives a speech defending Charlie, denounces Baird for not living up to its own standards, and urges the committee to value Charlie's integrity. The disciplinary committee places the instigators on probation, denies George credit for naming them, and excuses Charlie from the proceedings.

As Charlie escorts Frank to his limousine, political science professor Christine Downes, a member of the disciplinary committee, commends Frank for his speech. They flirt and he impresses her by recognizing her perfume. Charlie accompanies Frank home, where Frank happily greets his niece's children.

== Cast ==
- Al Pacino as Lt. Col. Frank Slade
- Chris O'Donnell as Charlie Simms
- James Rebhorn as Mr. Trask
- Gabrielle Anwar as Donna
- Philip Seymour Hoffman (credited Philip S. Hoffman) as George Willis, Jr.
- Sally Murphy as Karen Rossi
- Michael Santoro as Donny Rossi
- Nicholas Sadler as Harry Havemeyer
- Todd Louiso as Trent Potter
- Richard Venture as W. R. (“Willie”) Slade
- Bradley Whitford as Randy
- Rochelle Oliver as Gretchen
- Ron Eldard as Officer Gore
- June Squibb as Mrs. Hunsaker
- Baxter Harris as George Willis, Sr.
- Gene Canfield as Manny
- Leonard Gaines as Freddie Bisco
- Frances Conroy as Christine Downes

== Production ==
The rights to remake Dino Risi's Profumo di donna were purchased by Ovidio G. Assonitis and first slated for presale by Ronald DeNeef's Rainbow International at MIFED (Mercato internazionale del film e del documentario) in October 1988, alongside Assonitis's Beyond the Door III and Midnight Ride (then called Nowhere to Run). When Assonitis became Chairman of Cannon Pictures Inc. in 1989, he announced that his films currently in development and production, including the remake of Scent of a Woman, would be made and released under the Cannon banner.

By May 1990, Cannon Pictures had entered into an agreement with Universal Pictures to produce the film. In 1991, Bo Goldman was hired to write the screenplay. He later said, "If there is a moral to the film, it is that if we leave ourselves open and available to the surprising contradictions in life, we will find the strength to go on." Martin Brest was approached to direct the film in April 1991, and chose this film over another potential remake with which he was presented, a remake of Death Takes a Holiday (which he later made as Meet Joe Black, released in 1998 starring Brad Pitt, Claire Forlani and Anthony Hopkins). By early August, Brest had officially signed, and Al Pacino was being sought for the lead. Pacino officially signed on the following month.

=== Casting ===
Rising young actors, including Matt Damon, Ben Affleck, Brendan Fraser, Anthony Rapp, Randall Batinkoff, Chris Rock and Stephen Dorff auditioned for the role of Charlie Simms before Chris O'Donnell was cast in November 1991. Jack Nicholson was offered the role of Lt. Col. Frank Slade but turned it down.

=== Research ===
Pacino painstakingly researched his part in Scent of a Woman. To understand what it feels like to be blind, he met clients of New York's Associated Blind, being particularly interested in accounts by those who had lost their sight due to trauma. Clients traced the entire progression for him—from the moment when they knew that they would never see again to the depression and through to acceptance and adjustment. The Lighthouse, an advocacy group for the blind also in New York, schooled him in techniques that a vision impaired person might use to find a chair and seat themselves, pour liquid from a bottle, and light a cigar.

=== Filming ===
Production on Scent of a Woman began on December 3, 1991, in New York City, and ran until April 1992. It was filmed in the following US locations.

- Brooklyn, New York City
- Dumbo neighborhood, Brooklyn, New York City
- Emma Willard School, 285 Pawling Avenue, Troy, New York
- Hempstead House, Sands Point Preserve, 95 Middleneck Road, Port Washington, Long Island, New York
- Long Island, New York
- Manhattan, New York City
- Meeting House for the New York Society of Ethical Culture, Adler Hall, 2 W 64th St, New York, NY (Frank's speech defending Charlie)
- Newark Liberty International Airport, Newark, New Jersey
- The Oak Room, The Plaza Hotel, Fifth Avenue at 59th Street, Manhattan, New York City (where Frank and Charlie have dinner)
- Pierre Hotel, Fifth Avenue & 61st Street, Manhattan, New York City, Cotillion Ballroom (where Frank and Donna dance the tango)
- Port Washington, Long Island, New York
- Prince's Bay, Staten Island, New York City
- Princeton, New Jersey
- Queens, New York City
- Rockefeller College—Upper Madison Hall, Princeton University, Princeton, New Jersey (scene at the Baird library)
- Staten Island, New York City
- Troy, New York
- Waldorf-Astoria Hotel, 301 Park Avenue, Manhattan, New York City (Frank's hotel)

=== Music ===
Scent of a Woman

Soundtrack album by Thomas Newman
- Released: January 19, 1993
- Genres: Soundtrack, instrumental
- Label: MCA

The soundtrack music for the film is composed and conducted by Thomas Newman. The tango to which Frank and Donna dance is "Por una Cabeza".

Track listing

No.	Title	Writer(s)	Performer	Length
1.	"Main Title"
2.	"A Tour of Pleasures"
3.	"Tract House Ginch"
4.	"45 in 25"
5.	"Balloons"
6.	"Cigars, Part Two"
7.	"Por una Cabeza"	Gardel / Le Pera	The Tango Project
8.	"Long Gray Line"
9.	"The Oakroom"
10.	"Park Ave."
11.	"Witnesses"
12.	"Beyond Danger"
13.	"La Violetera"	Padilla	The Tango Project
14.	"El Relicario"	Padilla	The Tango Project
15.	"Other Plans"
16.	"Assembly"
17.	"Fleurs de Rocaille"
18.	"End Title"

== Reception ==
=== Box office ===
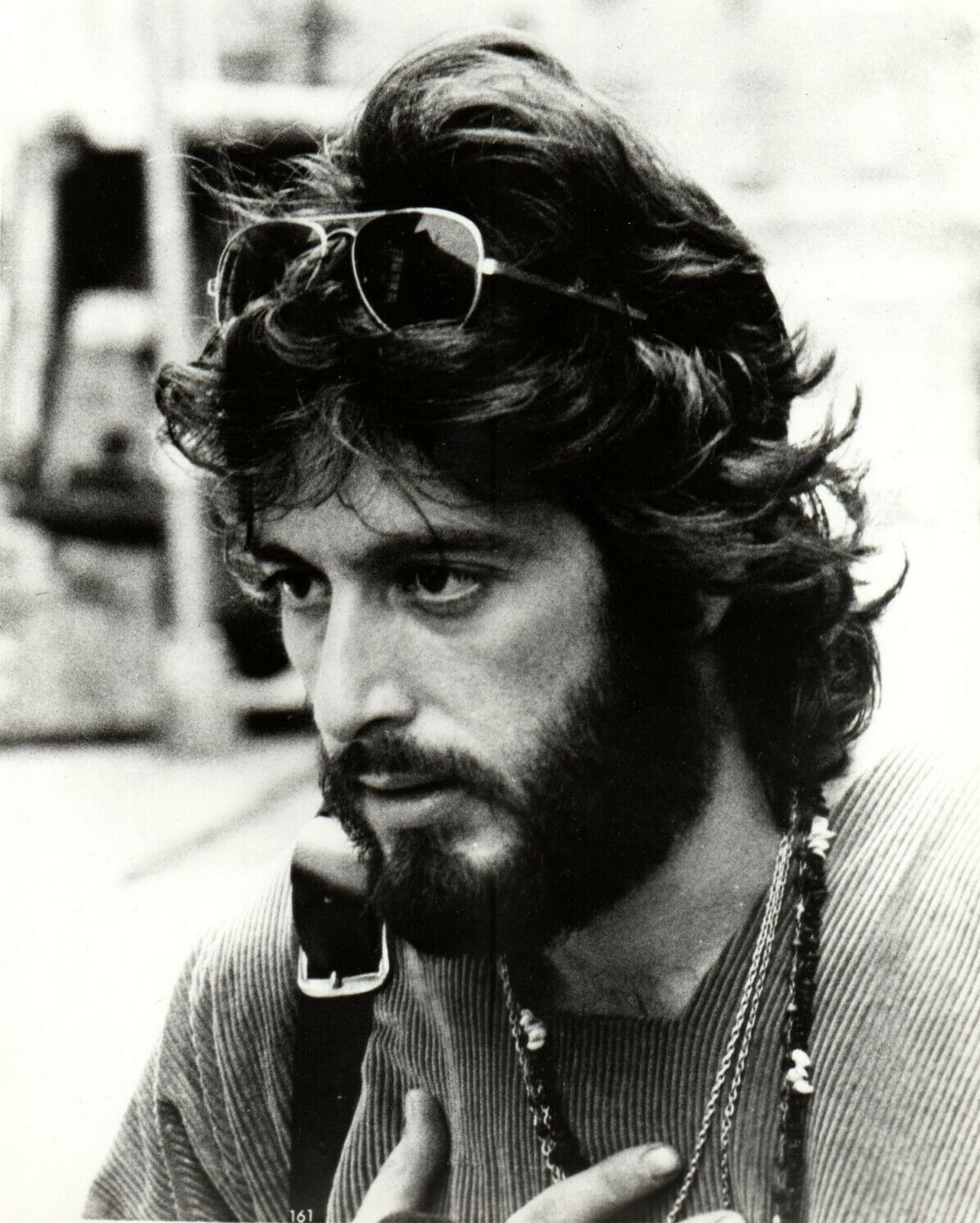
Al Pacino received critical acclaim which finally earned him the Academy Award for Best Actor, the only one of his nine nominations

The film opened at number 20 at the US Box Office. It would go on to earn $63,095,253 in the US and Canada and over $71 million internationally (excluding Italy), totaling $134,095,253 worldwide.

=== Critical response ===
As of 2026, the film holds an 82% approval rating on review aggregator Rotten Tomatoes from 50 reviews. The site's consensus states: "It might soar on Al Pacino's performance more than the drama itself, but what a performance it is – big, bold, occasionally over-the-top, and finally giving the Academy pause to award the star his first Oscar." The film holds a score of 57 out of 100 on Metacritic, based on 52 critic reviews. Two critics criticized the film for its length. Variety's Todd McCarthy said it "goes on nearly an hour too long". Newsweek's David Ansen writes that the "two-character conceit doesn't warrant a two-and-a-half-hour running time".

=== Accolades ===
Al Pacino won an Academy Award for Best Actor, the first of his career after four previous nominations for Best Actor. It was his eighth overall nomination. Ovidio G. Assonitis, who had originated the project and chose to go uncredited on the final cut of the film, took out a full-page advert in Variety congratulating Tom Pollock, Universal Pictures and Martin Brest for making the adaptation successful and praising Pacino on his Oscar win.

Award	Category	Nominee(s)	Result	Ref.
Academy Awards	Best Picture	Martin Brest	Nominated	
Academy Awards	Best Director	Martin Brest	Nominated	
Academy Awards	Best Actor	Al Pacino	Won	
Academy Awards	Best Screenplay – Based on Material Previously Produced or Published	Bo Goldman	Nominated	
American Cinema Editors Awards	Best Edited Feature Film	William Steinkamp, Michael Tronick, and Harvey Rosenstock	Nominated	
Artios Awards	Best Casting for Feature Film – Drama	Ellen Lewis	Nominated	
BMI Film & TV Awards	Film Music Award	Thomas Newman	Won	
British Academy Film Awards	Best Adapted Screenplay	Bo Goldman	Nominated	
Chicago Film Critics Association Awards	Best Actor	Al Pacino	Nominated	
Chicago Film Critics Association Awards	Most Promising Actor	Chris O'Donnell	Won	
Dallas–Fort Worth Film Critics Association Awards	Best Film		Nominated	
Golden Globe Awards	Best Motion Picture – Drama		Won	
Golden Globe Awards	Best Actor in a Motion Picture – Drama	Al Pacino	Won	
Golden Globe Awards	Best Supporting Actor – Motion Picture	Chris O'Donnell	Nominated	
Golden Globe Awards	Best Screenplay – Motion Picture	Bo Goldman	Won	
New York Film Critics Circle Awards	Best Actor	Al Pacino	Runner-up	
Producers Guild of America Awards	Outstanding Producer of Theatrical Motion Pictures	Martin Brest	Nominated	
Writers Guild of America Awards	Best Screenplay – Based on Material Previously Produced or Published	Bo Goldman	Nominated	
