= Jim Clark (film editor) =

British film editor and director (1931–2016)

- Born: James Clark; 24 May 1931; Boston, Lincolnshire, England
- Died: 25 February 2016 (aged 84); London, England
- Education: Oundle School
- Occupations: Editor, director
- Notable work: The Killing Fields; The Jackal; The World Is Not Enough
- Spouse: Laurence Méry-Clark (m. 1961)
- Awards: Academy Award for Film Editing (1985); BAFTA Award for Best Editing (1986)

Jim Clark (24 May 1931 – 25 February 2016) was a British film editor and film director. He has more than forty feature film credits between 1956 and 2008. Clark directed four feature films along with a handful of short films. Notably, he served as a creative consultant for Midnight Cowboy (1969). His most noted editing credits included Marathon Man (1976), The Killing Fields (1984), and Vera Drake (2004). In 2011, Clark published Dream Repairman: Adventures in Film Editing, a memoir of his career.

== Early life ==
Clark was born in 1931, and grew up in Boston, Lincolnshire. He was educated at Oundle School in Northamptonshire and founded the Oundle Film Society in 1947.

== Career ==
Clark moved to London, and in 1951 began work as an assistant editor at Ealing Studios. Subsequently he worked as a freelance assistant editor on two films directed by Stanley Donen and edited by Jack Harris. When Harris declined the opportunity to work on Donen's subsequent film, Surprise Package (1960), Donen gave Clark the job. As Clark later wrote,

It was a fairly bad movie and probably would have finished my career before it had started, but luckily Stanley got another film, The Grass Is Greener (1960), which he also asked me to edit. The cutting of the two films overlapped, which was great training for me. Soon after, I was asked to cut The Innocents (1961) starring Deborah Kerr, which has since become a classic story-driven, supernatural horror film. It was very hard to cut, but that film really put me on the map.

He received an Academy Award and a BAFTA Award for the editing of The Killing Fields (1984, directed by Roland Joffé), he received a second BAFTA Award for editing The Mission (1986, Joffé). Clark was also nominated for BAFTA Awards for his editing of the films Marathon Man (1976, directed by John Schlesinger) and Vera Drake (2004, directed by Mike Leigh). In 2005, Clark received the American Cinema Editors Career Achievement Award.

Responding to a question about the major influences on his editing, Clark said

Looking back over many years, the American cinema of the 40s was very important to me, along with Hitchcock films and early British comedies with actors like Will Hay and George Formby. Music has also played a major role, it influences the rhythm of my editing. The pacing of a film and its dialogue have a lot to do with music, and the act of going from one shot to another has always fascinated me - when and how you do it, the reason for an edit.

As a director he was responsible for The Christmas Tree (1966), Every Home Should Have One (1970), Rentadick (1972), and Madhouse (1974).

== Personal life and memoir ==
Clark lived in Kensington with his wife Laurence Méry-Clark, likewise a film and television editor. They married in 1961 and had three children. Clark's autobiography Dream Repairman: Adventures in Film Editing was published in 2011, receiving warm reviews from The Guardian and The Observer.

== Filmography ==
=== As director ===
- The Christmas Tree (1966)
- Every Home Should Have One (1970)
- Rentadick (1972)
- Madhouse (1974)

== See also ==
- List of film director and editor collaborations - Clark's collaboration with director John Schlesinger extended over about sixteen years and eight films. Midnight Cowboy (1969) and Marathon Man (1976) are among their most recognized films. Hugh A. Robertson is credited as the editor for Midnight Cowboy, with Clark being a "creative consultant," Robertson won the BAFTA Award for Best Editing and was nominated for the Academy Award for Best Film Editing for the film.
