= William Steinkamp =

American film editor (1953–2025)

- Born: June 9, 1953
- Died: March 25, 2025 (aged 71)
- Occupation: Film editor
- Years active: 1977–2025

William Steinkamp (June 9, 1953 – March 25, 2025) was an American film editor with more than 20 film credits. He had a longstanding, notable collaboration with director Sydney Pollack, editing nearly all of Pollack's films from Tootsie (1982) through the director's last film, The Interpreter (2005).

== Career ==
Steinkamp's first credits are as an assistant editor to his father, Fredric Steinkamp, on two of Pollack's films in the late 1970s. From 1980 on, Steinkamp co-edited most of Pollack's films with his father; after his father's retirement in 1995, William Steinkamp became Pollack's principal editor through the end of the latter's career in 2005. Steinkamp has edited several of director Gary Fleder's films, from Kiss the Girls (1997) through The Express (2008).

== Awards ==
Steinkamp has been nominated for the Academy Award for Film Editing for editing two films directed by Pollack, Tootsie (1982), and Out of Africa (1985); Fredric Steinkamp was also nominated for these films. He was again nominated as sole editor for The Fabulous Baker Boys (directed by Steve Kloves, 1989). He has been nominated for ACE Eddie awards for editing Tootsie (1982), Out of Africa (1985), and Scent of a Woman (directed by Martin Brest - 1992).

Steinkamp has been selected for membership in the American Cinema Editors.

== Death ==
Steinkamp died on March 25, 2025, after a two-year battle with cancer; he was 71.

== Filmography ==
Editor
| Year | Film | Director | Notes |
|---|---|---|---|
| 1980 | Hide in Plain Sight | James Caan | |
| 1981 | King of the Mountain | Noel Nosseck | |
| 1982 | Tootsie | Sydney Pollack | Second collaboration with Sydney Pollack |
| 1984 | Against All Odds | Taylor Hackford | First collaboration with Taylor Hackford |
| 1985 | White Nights | Taylor Hackford | Second collaboration with Taylor Hackford |
| 1985 | Out of Africa | Sydney Pollack | Third collaboration with Sydney Pollack |
| 1987 | Burglar | Hugh Wilson | |
| 1987 | Adventures in Babysitting | Chris Columbus | |
| 1988 | Scrooged | Richard Donner | |
| 1989 | The Fabulous Baker Boys | Steve Kloves | |
| 1990 | Havana | Sydney Pollack | Fourth collaboration with Sydney Pollack |
| 1992 | Man Trouble | Bob Rafelson | |
| 1992 | Scent of a Woman | Martin Brest | |
| 1993 | The Firm | Sydney Pollack | Fifth collaboration with Sydney Pollack |
| 1996 | Heaven's Prisoners | Phil Joanou | |
| 1996 | A Time to Kill | Joel Schumacher | |
| 1997 | Kiss the Girls | Gary Fleder | First collaboration with Gary Fleder |
| 1998 | Goodbye Lover | Roland Joffé | |
| 1999 | Mumford | Lawrence Kasdan | |
| 1999 | Random Hearts | Sydney Pollack | Sixth collaboration with Sydney Pollack |
| 2001 | Heartbreakers | David Mirkin | |
| 2001 | Don't Say a Word | Gary Fleder | Second collaboration with Gary Fleder |
| 2003 | Runaway Jury | Gary Fleder | Third collaboration with Gary Fleder |
| 2005 | The Interpreter | Sydney Pollack | Seventh collaboration with Sydney Pollack |
| 2007 | August Rush | Kirsten Sheridan | |
| 2008 | The Express: The Ernie Davis Story | Gary Fleder | Fourth collaboration with Gary Fleder |
| 2010 | Casino Jack | George Hickenlooper | |
| 2012 | The Courier | Hany Abu-Assad | |
| 2012 | Freaky Deaky | Charles Matthau | |
| 2012 | A Dark Truth | Damian Lee | First collaboration with Damian Lee |
| 2013 | Breakout | Damian Lee | Second collaboration with Damian Lee |
| 2014 | A Fighting Man | Damian Lee | Third collaboration with Damian Lee |
| 2014 | After | Pieter Gaspersz | |
| 2017 | The Shack | Stuart Hazeldine | |
| 2021 | Mixtape | Valerie Weiss | |

Editorial department
| Year | Film | Director | Role | Notes |
|---|---|---|---|---|
| 1977 | Bobby Deerfield | Sydney Pollack | Assistant editor | First collaboration with Sydney Pollack |
| 1978 | Fedora | Billy Wilder | Assistant editor | |
| 2013 | Girl on a Bicycle | Jeremy Leven | Additional editor | |

Producer
| Year | Film | Director | Credit |
|---|---|---|---|
| 2017 | The Shack | Stuart Hazeldine | Co-producer |

Thanks
| Year | Film | Director | Role |
|---|---|---|---|
| 1986 | Back to School | Alan Metter | The producers wish to thank |
| 1999 | A Walk on the Moon | Tony Goldwyn | The producers wish to thank |

== See also ==
- List of film director and editor collaborations
