= Fredric Steinkamp =

American film editor (1928–2002)

- Born: Fredric W. Steinkamp; August 22, 1928
- Died: February 20, 2002 (aged 73); Santa Monica, California
- Occupation: Film editor
- Years active: 1960–1995

Fredric Steinkamp (August 22, 1928 – February 20, 2002) was an American film editor with more than 40 film credits. He had a longstanding, notable collaboration with director Sydney Pollack, editing nearly all of Pollack's films from They Shoot Horses, Don't They? (1969) through Sabrina (1995).

Steinkamp began his career working part-time in the sound department of the MGM Studios. He became an assistant editor at MGM, and worked for Adrienne Fazan, Ralph E. Winters, Jack Dunning, and Harold F. Kress. Kress recommended Steinkamp as the editor for The Adventures of Huckleberry Finn (directed by Michael Curtiz, 1960), which was Steinkamp's first editing credit. From 1980 on, Steinkamp co-edited most films with his son, William Steinkamp; after 1995, William Steinkamp became Sydney Pollack's principal editor through the end of the latter's career in 2005.

Steinkamp won the Academy Award for Best Film Editing for Grand Prix (directed by John Frankenheimer, 1966). He was nominated for the Academy Award for editing four films directed by Pollack: They Shoot Horses, Don't They? (1969), Three Days of the Condor (1975), Tootsie (1982), and Out of Africa (1985). All of these films had co-editors, including his son William Steinkamp for the last two. He was nominated for the BAFTA Award for Best Editing for They Shoot Horses, Don't They? (1969). He was nominated for ACE Eddie awards for editing The Unsinkable Molly Brown (directed by Charles Walters - 1964), Grand Prix (1966), Tootsie (1982), and Out of Africa (1985).

In 2001 Steinkamp received the Career Achievement Award of the American Cinema Editors (ACE).

== Filmography ==
Editor
Year	Film	Director	Notes
1960	The Adventures of Huckleberry Finn	Michael Curtiz	
1960	Where the Boys Are	Henry Levin	
1961	Two Loves	Charles Walters	First collaboration with Charles Walters
1962	All Fall Down	John Frankenheimer	First collaboration with John Frankenheimer
1962	Period of Adjustment	George Roy Hill	
1963	It Happened at the World's Fair	Norman Taurog	
1963	Sunday in New York	Peter Tewksbury	First collaboration with Peter Tewksbury
1964	The Unsinkable Molly Brown	Charles Walters	Second collaboration with Charles Walters
1964	Quick, Before It Melts	Delbert Mann	First collaboration with Delbert Mann
1965	Once a Thief	Ralph Nelson	First collaboration with Ralph Nelson
1966	Duel at Diablo	Ralph Nelson	Second collaboration with Ralph Nelson
1966	Mister Buddwing	Delbert Mann	Second collaboration with Delbert Mann
1967	Doctor, You've Got to Be Kidding!	Peter Tewksbury	Second collaboration with Peter Tewksbury
1968	Charly	Ralph Nelson	Third collaboration with Ralph Nelson
1969	The Extraordinary Seaman	John Frankenheimer	Third collaboration with John Frankenheimer
1969	Midas Run	Alf Kjellin	
1969	They Shoot Horses, Don't They?	Sydney Pollack	First collaboration with Sydney Pollack
1970	The Strawberry Statement	Stuart Hagmann	
1971	A New Leaf	Elaine May	
1971	The Marriage of a Young Stockbroker	Lawrence Turman	
1974	Nightmare Honeymoon	Elliot Silverstein	
1974	Freebie and the Bean	Richard Rush	
1977	Bobby Deerfield	Sydney Pollack	Fourth collaboration with Sydney Pollack
1978	Fedora	Billy Wilder	
1980	Hide in Plain Sight	James Caan	
1982	Tootsie	Sydney Pollack	Fifth collaboration with Sydney Pollack
1984	Against All Odds	Taylor Hackford	First collaboration with Taylor Hackford
1985	White Nights	Taylor Hackford	Second collaboration with Taylor Hackford
1985	Out of Africa	Sydney Pollack	Sixth collaboration with Sydney Pollack
1987	Burglar	Hugh Wilson	
1987	Adventures in Babysitting	Chris Columbus	
1988	Scrooged	Richard Donner	
1990	Havana	Sydney Pollack	Seventh collaboration with Sydney Pollack
1993	Blood In Blood Out	Taylor Hackford	Third collaboration with Taylor Hackford
1993	The Firm	Sydney Pollack	Eighth collaboration with Sydney Pollack
1995	Sabrina	Sydney Pollack	Ninth collaboration with Sydney Pollack

Editorial department
Year	Film	Director	Role	Notes
1958	Imitation General	George Marshall	Assistant editor	Uncredited
1959	Ben-Hur	William Wyler	Supervising editor	Uncredited
1966	Grand Prix	John Frankenheimer	Supervising editor	Second collaboration with John Frankenheimer
1974	The Yakuza	Sydney Pollack	Supervising film editor	Second collaboration with Sydney Pollack
1975	Three Days of the Condor	Sydney Pollack	Supervising editor	Third collaboration with Sydney Pollack
1976	Harry and Walter Go to New York	Mark Rydell	Supervising film editor	

Producer
Year	Film	Director	Credit
1971	The Marriage of a Young Stockbroker	Lawrence Turman	Associate producer

Thanks
Year	Film	Director	Role
1986	Back to School	Alan Metter	The producers wish to thank

== See also ==
- List of film director and editor collaborations
