= American Cinema Editors Awards 1967 =

17th ACE Eddie Awards
- Presented by: American Cinema Editors
- Date: April 1, 1967
- Site: The Century Plaza Hotel, Los Angeles, California
- Hosted by: Rose Marie

Highlights
- Best Film: Fantastic Voyage; Grand Prix

The 17th American Cinema Editors Awards, which were presented on Saturday, April 1, 1967, at The Century Plaza Hotel, honored the best editors in films and television. The awards categories were narrowed to two categories, focusing more on the film editors than the last two ceremonies. The award was also not televised. The award was hosted by comedian Rose Marie. This ceremony was also the introduction of the "ACE Golden Eddie Filmmaker of the Year Award", which was won by Acadaemy-winning director and former editor Robert Wise. Julie Andrews, who previously won "Best Actress" awards in the last two ceremonies, presented the award to Wise.

== Nominees ==
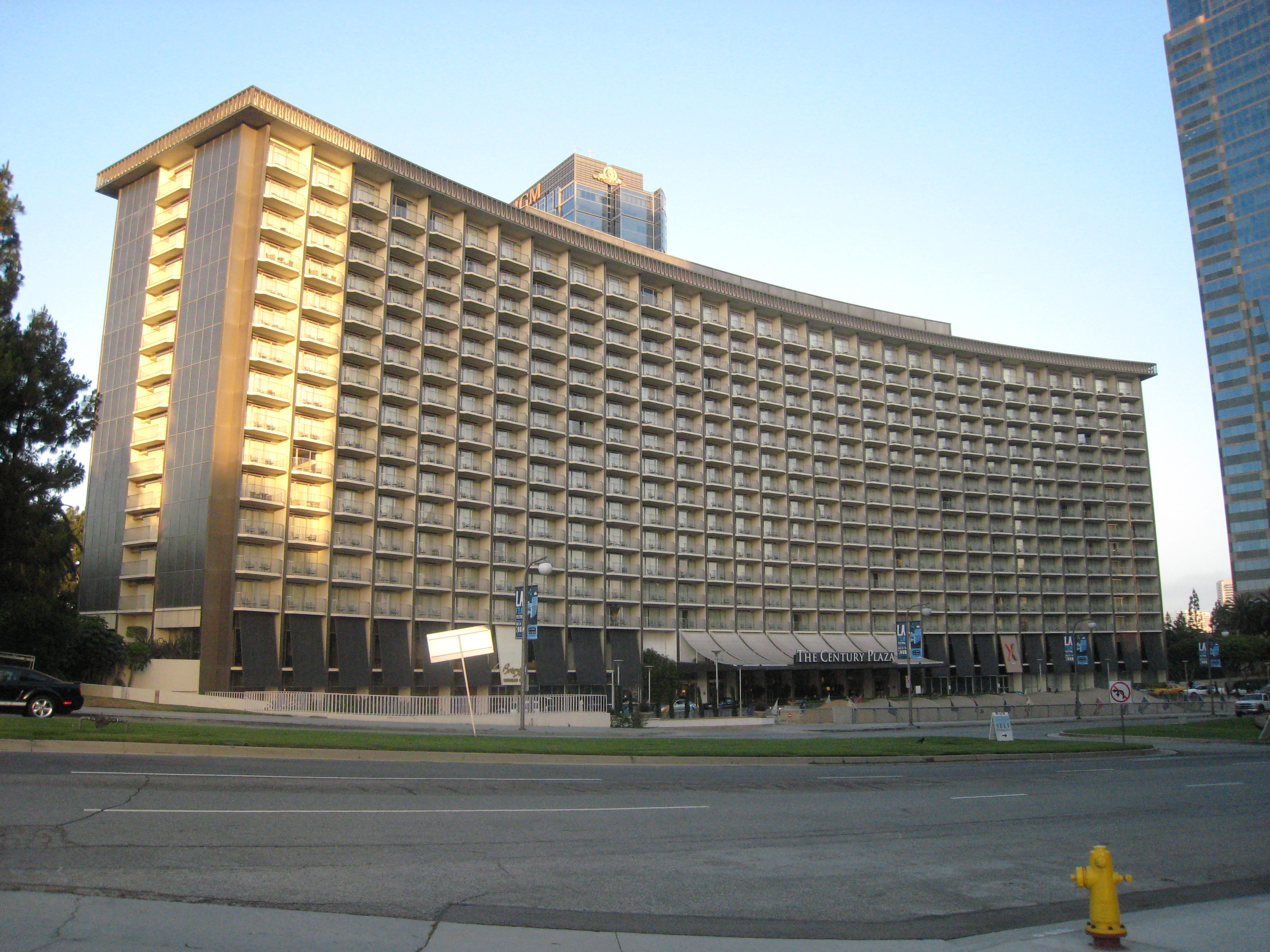
The Century Plaza Hotel, the site of the 1967 Eddies.

Best Edited Feature Film	Best Edited Television Program
Fantastic Voyage – William B. Murphy; Grand Prix – Fredric Steinkamp (supervising editor), Henry Berman, Stu Linder, and Frank Santillo; The Professionals – Peter Zinner; The Sand Pebbles – William H. Reynolds; Who's Afraid of Virginia Woolf? – Sam O'Steen	Twelve O'Clock High: "The All American" – Jodie Copelan; The Big Valley: "Day of Terror" – Desmond Marquette; Fame Is the Name of the Game – Joseph Dervin; The F.B.I.: "The Camel's Nose" – Thomas Neff; I Spy: "Court of the Lion" – Bud Molin
