= William B. Murphy =

American film editor

- Born: January 9, 1908; Mexia, Texas, United States
- Died: July 2, 1970 (aged 62); Los Angeles, California, United States
- Occupation: Film editor

William B. Murphy (January 9, 1908 – July 2, 1970) was an American film editor who, in the course of a twenty-year career, served as president of American Cinema Editors (ACE) from 1952 to 1955 and was distinguished in 1966 with ACE's Eddie Award for his work on the science fiction film, Fantastic Voyage, which also earned him an Academy Award nomination for Best Editing.

Born in Mexia, a small city in Central Texas' Limestone County, William B. Murphy was 41 when his name first appeared in film credits as co-editor (with Richard Cahoon) of the independently produced 1949 B-western, Massacre River, released by United Artists. The following year, hired by 20th Century Fox, he worked on several of the studio's 1950s "A" productions, including three Clifton Webb vehicles, Mr. Belvedere Rings the Bell, Elopement (both 1951) and Mister Scoutmaster (1953), as well as Howard Hawks' Cary Grant-Ginger Rogers 1952 comedy, Monkey Business, and the 1957 Pat Boone-Shirley Jones musical, April Love. He also proved adept at westerns, editing Powder River (1953), Three Young Texans, The Gambler from Natchez (both 1954), Stranger on Horseback (1955), Mohawk (1956) and The Lonely Man (1957).

Leaving Fox in 1957, he served as editorial supervisor on several film and television projects (The Bachelor Party, Kings Go Forth, The Adventures of Ozzie and Harriet) and, by 1959, returned as a full-time editor in features and TV episodes, with credits on the independent science fiction production, 4D Man, along with at least eight installments of the hit ABC crime drama, The Untouchables.

In his final decade, 1960s, Murphy edited an entry in the series of films tailored for Elvis Presley, Follow That Dream (1962), followed by a psychiatric hospital melodrama, The Caretakers (1963), and the big-budget 1965 spoof, John Goldfarb, Please Come Home. Among his last three features, another top-dollar production, Fantastic Voyage, not only had a much bigger budget than his previous sci-fi assignment, 4D Man, but also proved to be a major moneymaker, ultimately going on to become one of the year's highest-grossing films with Oscar nominations in five technical categories, two of which, Best Art Direction—Color and Best Visual Effects, were selected as winners. Although Murphy lost in the Best Editing category to the Grand Prix team of Fredric Steinkamp, Henry Berman, Stewart Linder and Frank Santillo, his win of ACE's Eddie Award, in addition to the film's other awards and nominations (Hugo, Laurel and the Motion Picture Sound Editors' Golden Reel Award), brought him accolades and professional renown at near-end of his career. His penultimate film, Roger Corman's 1967 recreation of The St. Valentine's Day Massacre, returned to the same milieu he had covered while working on The Untouchables and, concluding his list of credits was Delbert Mann's The Pink Jungle, a tepidly reviewed 1968 comedy-adventure set in a South American jungle.

William B. Murphy died in Los Angeles at the age of 62.
