= Steve McQueen: The Man & Le Mans =

- Theatrical release poster
- Directed by: Gabriel Clarke; John McKenna
- Produced by: Gabriel Clarke; John McKenna
- Starring: Steve McQueen
- Cinematography: Matt Smith
- Edited by: Matt Wyllie
- Music by: Jim Copperthwaite
- Production companies: I Wonder Pictures (Italy); Marco Polo Production (France)
- Distributed by: FilmRise (US); Marco Polo Production (France); The Works UK Distribution (UK)
- Release dates: 16 May 2015 (Cannes); 13 November 2015 (US)
- Running time: 102 minutes
- Country: United States
- Language: English

Steve McQueen: The Man & Le Mans is a 2015 documentary directed by John McKenna and Gabriel Clarke. It premiered at the 68th Cannes Film Festival and was one of two British films to be an official selection for the Cannes Film Festival in 2015.

== Synopsis ==
The film focuses on film star Steve McQueen's efforts to take control of his career. After the success of Bullitt and The Thomas Crown Affair, McQueen sought to pursue his dream of creating a film about his passion: race-car driving. The result, Le Mans, was a box-office flop.

McQueen, who did many of his own motorcycle and car driving stunts, drove a Porsche with a broken left foot to finish second at 12 Hours of Sebring. The documentary interweaves newly discovered material and McQueen's private recordings with interviews with surviving members of the production team to reveal the true story of how the film was made. The documentary depicts McQueen's efforts to set up his own production company, Solar Productions, and with the collaboration of a new Hollywood company named Cinema Center Films, film the 24 Hours of Le Mans race in the summer of 1970. Cinema Center Films invested $6 million ($50 million today) in the movie, the largest budget ever for a McQueen film. John Sturges, who had worked with McQueen in The Magnificent Seven and The Great Escape, directed the film. Alan Trustman, McQueen's most trusted writer, was initially chosen to write the script.

In the documentary, Hal Hamilton exclaims, "We had the star, we had the drivers. We had an incredible array of technical support, we had everything. Except a script." Haig Altounian, McQueen's chief mechanic, said, "We were winging it."

Cinema Center Films, which had not previously been involved with the film, took over the production after a few months and soon suspended production for two weeks. Cinema Center's management was so upset with the film's progress that they called Robert Redford to see if he would replace McQueen and even considered shutting it down completely. Eventually, Cinema Center and McQueen struck a deal in which he agreed to give up his salary, his percentage of any profits and control of the film so it could be finished. However, further problems would prod Sturges to walk out, saying, "I am too old and too rich to put up with this shit." McQueen fell out with Trustman and fired him, and Trustman barely worked in Hollywood again. McQueen and producer Robert Relyea then had a falling out, and television director Lee H. Katzin took over.

Several serious car crashes occurred while the film was being made. Derek Bell was almost killed when the Ferrari 512 he was driving caught fire as he tried get into position for a take. Although he managed to get out just before the car was engulfed in flames, he still suffered minor burns. A second accident, involving driver David Piper, was far more serious. Doctors were forced to amputate Piper's leg as a result, and according to the documentary, he and McQueen never saw each other again. Off screen, McQueen crashed a personal car, injuring Mario Iscovich, his personal assistant, and the film's female lead, Louise Edlind. To avoid a scandal, Iscovich took the blame for the accident and soon left the set without a job. McQueen was apparently extremely worried that Edlind would reveal the truth and ruin the film before it could be finished.

While the film was being made, McQueen discovered he was on Charles Manson's kill list. Rightly fearing for his life, McQueen attempted to get a gun to protect himself. His marriage to Neile Adams McQueen was falling apart as well. Clarke says, "after years of quietly tolerating Steve's innumerable indiscretions, Neile revealed that she had had an affair of her own".

The documentary suggests that the disasters on set and the financial problems that plagued the film had more of an effect on McQueen than anyone realized and led to the collapse of his business empire and marriage. In the documentary, writer Chrissy Iley explains that McQueen had hoped to build a movie empire and take control of his career as a film maker, and the first step toward this goal would be Le Mans, the definitive racing movie. The movie turned out to be a creative and box-office disappointment, although it retains a reputation, particularly among auto sports fans, for the documentary-like authenticity with which it catches the racing ethos and experience. McQueen did not go to the premiere, and he never raced in a car again.

== Production ==
=== Found footage ===
McQueen's Le Mans wasn't the first race car film of the era. He had been beaten to the screen by Grand Prix, starring James Garner. For McQueen, it became essential to now make a film free from special effects or artifice, and the camera team installed camera on his car to capture his vision of racing. That meant filming real cars and real professional drivers, racing at real speeds, in real time, with a budget of $6m (about $37m today). It was rumoured that more than a million feet of film was shot during production of Le Mans. Members of the production crew, including McQueen's son Chad, claimed the material had been incinerated and nobody knew where it was. This footage was therefore nicknamed 'the holy grail' during pre-production of Steve McQueen: The Man & Le Mans .

In an interview for The Independent, director Gabriel Clarke recalls, "We spoke to family, to people who had worked on this project. As far as they were concerned, this film didn’t exist." There was "a vague lead" to an abandoned warehouse in New Jersey. Clarke and McKenna had a late-night call to an editor in Los Angeles the day before production of the documentary began. An e-mail came back saying, "Beneath a soundstage covered in dust, we found between 400 and 600 boxes of film, each with ‘Le Mans’ along its spine, They don't smell of vinegar, and so may have survived intact". The rushes came without sound, but the filmmakers made sure during post-production that every last growl of an engine was authentic. Whether it was McQueen's Porsche 917 or another driver's Ferrari 512, the sound each car makes is exactly as it should be.

Researchers located a Swiss "making-of" documentary, filmed while McQueen was on set. "Some of our footage came from private family collections," Clarke says. A behind-the-scenes 'making of' documentary by John Klawitter existed but had never been released. Other sources began to surface, including hours of Super 8mm home movie footage shot by one of the drivers, Paul Blancpain, during the race.

== Cast ==
The documentary cast includes many who were involved in race car driving and/or production of the original film, or who were part of McQueen's life. This includes: Neile Adams, McQueen's wife at the time; Chad McQueen, McQueen and Adams' son; Derek Bell, a future five-time Le Mans winner, who was injured in a serious incident while driving for the film; Jonathan Williams, a professional racing driver who drove McQueen's personal Porsche 908 during Le Mans's racing scenes; David Piper, professional racing driver whose leg was amputated after a serious accident while driving for the film; Siegfried Rauch, the actor cast as McQueen's nemesis; Louise Edlind Friberg, the lead actress in the film who was injured in an accident while McQueen was driving home from dinner near LeMans; Alan Trustman, the former scriptwriter whose writing career ended with Le Mans; Peter Samuelson, whose teenage introduction to the film business was as a 'gofer' on the set of Le Mans; and Craig Relyea, son of McQueen's business partner Robert Relyea.
