= Matthew Lorenzo =

British journalist

Matthew Lorenzo is a British journalist television presenter and film producer who has worked for Sky, BBC, ITV, Channel Four and GMTV. He is the son of the late former BBC and ITV sports commentator and journalist Peter Lorenzo.

== Broadcasting career ==
Lorenzo was the first sports presenter to appear on Sky TV when it launched in 1989, after a career in newspapers, BBC TV and BBC Radio. He then moved to ITV to present sport on London Tonight before launching ITV Sport's Champions League coverage in 1993. He became the youngest-ever anchor of a networked World Cup in 1994. Later that year he signed with GMTV to host the Newshour daily for three years before returning to Sky Sports. Since then he has hosted football and cricket games, worked with Bernie Ecclestone as anchor of Sky's F1 Digital + service and hosted the Sky Sports News breakfast show. He later launched the Times and Sunday Times' online football service.

== Other projects ==
Lorenzo produced "Hurst the First and Only" which premiered on Sky Documentaries in November 2022. The Mirror called it "a stunning documentary...searingly powerful." The Times gave it four stars as did The Telegraph. Lorenzo's film "The United Way with Eric Cantona" was released on Sky Documentaries in May 2021 and was described by the Irish Independent as "Gloriously entertaining...thrilling and evocative." The film was nominated for Sports Documentary of the Year, Broadcast Sports Awards, 2021. From 2013 to 2016 he produced the cinema feature Bobby, which examines the life story of footballer Bobby Moore. It was the first film to be premiered on the pitch at Wembley Stadium - in May 2016 - as part of the celebrations surrounding the 50th anniversary of England's only World Cup win. Bobby received universally good reviews, and the film received a rare 100 per cent rating from the movie review site Rotten Tomatoes.

Lorenzo was Executive Producer on the award-winning Bobby Robson: More Than a Manager.
