= Finding Jack Charlton =

2020 documentary film

- Film poster
- Directed by: Gabriel Clarke; Pete Thomas
- Produced by: Torquil Jones; John McKenna
- Starring: Jack Charlton
- Production companies: Noah Media Group; Virgin Media Ireland; BBC Storyville
- Release date: November 6, 2020
- Running time: 97 minutes

Finding Jack Charlton is a 2020 English documentary film about the life of Jack Charlton.

The film, directed by Gabriel Clarke and Pete Thomas, was released digitally on 23 November 2020 after a theatrical release on 6 November 2020. The film was set to air on BBC Two in 2021.

== Synopsis ==
Finding Jack Charlton covers the managing career of Charlton. He took over the leadership of the Republic of Ireland national football team in 1986 and became one of the most beloved people in the country. Although the film directors initially planned to make the film about Charlton's importance in Ireland, they realized after visiting Charlton that his dementia was too advanced to be able to speak to him about his past. The filmmakers shifted their focus to include Charlton's last years and the impact of dementia on him and his family.

Other Irish footballers and cultural icons, including Larry Mullen Jr., Roddy Doyle, and Paul McGrath, are interviewed in the documentary.

== Critical reception ==
Finding Jack Charlton received positive reviews from film critics. It holds a 100% approval rating on review aggregator website Rotten Tomatoes, based on 14 reviews with an average of 8.5/10.
