= Robert Relyea =

American film producer

Robert Emile Relyea (May 3, 1930 - March 5, 2013) was an American film producer and executive. He was known for several films produced in collaboration with Steve McQueen. Relyea served as President of Production at MGM/United Artists (MGM/UA) from 1997 to 2001.

== Life and career ==
Relyea was born in Santa Monica, California. He attended UCLA and was a member of Alpha Sigma Phi fraternity. Relyea began his career in 1955 as a crew member at MGM. He worked with director John Sturges as assistant director on the 1959 World War II film Never So Few and the 1960 western, The Magnificent Seven. He also worked as an Assistant Director for John Wayne on The Alamo and Robert Wise and Jerome Robbins on West Side Story. Wise was so impressed with Relyea he offered him a job running his production company as a partner but Relyea felt indebted to Sturges and joined his production company, Alpha Corp Development Pvt Ltd., in 1961. There, he worked on the 1963 film The Great Escape, starring Steve McQueen where he shot many of the night scenes and doubled for James Garner in the flying sequences, including crashing the stolen plane, which sent Relyea to the hospital with lifelong injuries. He also worked with Sturges on The Satan Bug, and The Hallelujah Trail.

Relyea was also a sort of in-house production executive for The Mirisch Company where he worked on many of their productions for United Artists, including William Wyler's The Children's Hour, 633 Squadron, Kings of the Sun,"' and Blake Edward's second Inspector Clouseau film, A Shot in the Dark. Relyea then joined McQueen to run his Solar Productions in 1966, producing Bullitt in 1968 and The Reivers in 1969. Following the commercial failure of Le Mans in 1971, they ended their partnership, and Relyea returned to MGM/UA in 1993 after working as an independent producer in film and television and heading production at Paramount Studios. He oversaw production on several James Bond films, including GoldenEye, Tomorrow Never Dies, The World Is Not Enough and Die Another Day.

Relyea was highly respected in the film industry and California governor Pete Wilson appointed him chair of the California Film Commission in 1996. Relyea's 2008 autobiography, "Not So Quiet on the Set," described film production during "Hollywood's macho era." He died of natural causes in Thousand Oaks, California.
