= Gabriel Clarke =

British television journalist and documentary filmmaker

- Born: Gabriel Sean Clarke; 5 December 1963 (age 62); Kensington, London, England
- Education: University of London
- Occupations: Television journalist Documentary film maker
- Parent(s): Jane Harris; Alan Clarke

Gabriel Clarke is a British TV journalist and documentary filmmaker.

Clarke earned an English Literature degree from the University of London and began his journalistic career with local newspapers in Somerset and Bristol. He started his sports broadcasting career with Radio Trent in the East Midlands before moving into TV.

Clarke joined ITV Sport in 1991, as a reporter for the Saint and Greavsie television programme.

He has worked across ITV Sport's output covering European Championships, FIFA World Cups, Rugby World Cups, the Boat Race and World Championship boxing, and also presenting ITV's Football League highlights show Football League Extra.

Clarke has been named the Royal Television Society Sports News Reporter of the Year three times: 2001, 2002 and 2005. He is also the winner of the Royal Television Society awards for Sports Feature (2002, 2005) and Sports Creative Sequence (2002).

Clarke's recent interviews with the England football team have created controversy, being accused of asking leading questions attempting to cause potential disagreements within the England camp. Following England's 2026 World Cup quarter-final victory over Norway, Clarke faced criticism for questioning Jude Bellingham about comments made by manager Thomas Tuchel, with some observers arguing that the exchange risked creating an impression of tension between player and coach. Similar criticism arose after England's victory over Spain in November 2026, when Clarke's questioning of Declan Rice and rephrasing of what was said in his subsequent interview with Tuchel prompted accusations from commentators, including Simon Jordan, that he was attempting to "stir the pot" by presenting Rice's remarks in a way that suggested disagreement where none existed.

== Documentaries ==
Title	Notes
Calzaghe: No Average Joe (2006)	
Amir Khan, The Story So Far (2007)	
Clough (2009)	Nominated for Grierson Award in "Most entertaining documentary" category.
When Playboys Ruled The World (2010)	
Steve McQueen: The Man & Le Mans (2015)	
Bobby Robson: More Than a Manager (2018)	
Finding Jack Charlton (2020)	
Arsene Wenger: Invincible (2021)	

== Personal life ==
He is the son of Jane Harris and film director Alan Clarke (1935–90), whose work includes Scum, Made in Britain and The Firm. Clarke Snr., an Everton F.C. supporter, named his son after Scotland and Everton forward Jimmy Gabriel.
