= Gordon Daniel =

English sound editor

- Born: Gordon Adams Daniel; 5 April 1923; Ormskirk, Lancashire, England
- Died: 21 August 2009 (aged 86); Camelford, Cornwall, England
- Occupation: Sound editor
- Years active: 1955–1988

Gordon Adams Daniel (5 April 1923 – 21 August 2009) was an English sound editor, with 51 different films from 1955 to 1988. He won the Academy Award for the film Grand Prix for Best Sound Editing at the 39th Academy Awards.

== Selected filmography ==
Daniel's career spanned more than three decades.

- Police Academy 5: Assignment Miami Beach (1988)
- Wall Street (1987)
- Platoon (1986)
- European Vacation (1985)
- Vision Quest (1985)
- The Terminator (1984)
- Taps (1981)
- The Jerk (1979)
- 10 (1979)
- The Longest Yard (1974)
- Papillon (1973)
- Grand Prix (1966)
- The Spy Who Came in from the Cold (1965)
- A Hard's Day Night (1964)
- Village of the Damned (1960)
