= The Racing Scene =

- Theatrical releasee poster
- Directed by: Andy Sidaris
- Written by: William Edgar
- Produced by: James Garner, Barry Scholer
- Starring: James Garner; Mario Andretti; Bob Bondurant
- Cinematography: Earl Rath
- Edited by: Jim Gross
- Music by: Don Randi
- Distributed by: Maron Films
- Release dates: 1969; (United States theatrical release), Astral Films (Canadian theatrical release)
- Running time: 92 minutes
- Country: United States
- Language: English

The Racing Scene is a 1969 documentary film about actor James Garner and his auto racing team, directed by Andy Sidaris. The picture offers a glimpse of Garner's role and the teams and cars he sponsored during the middle of three years (1968-1970) his American International Racing team campaigned over a variety of racing series. The Racing Scene was the first film directed by Sidaris, whose background at that time had been in sports telecasting.

== Background ==
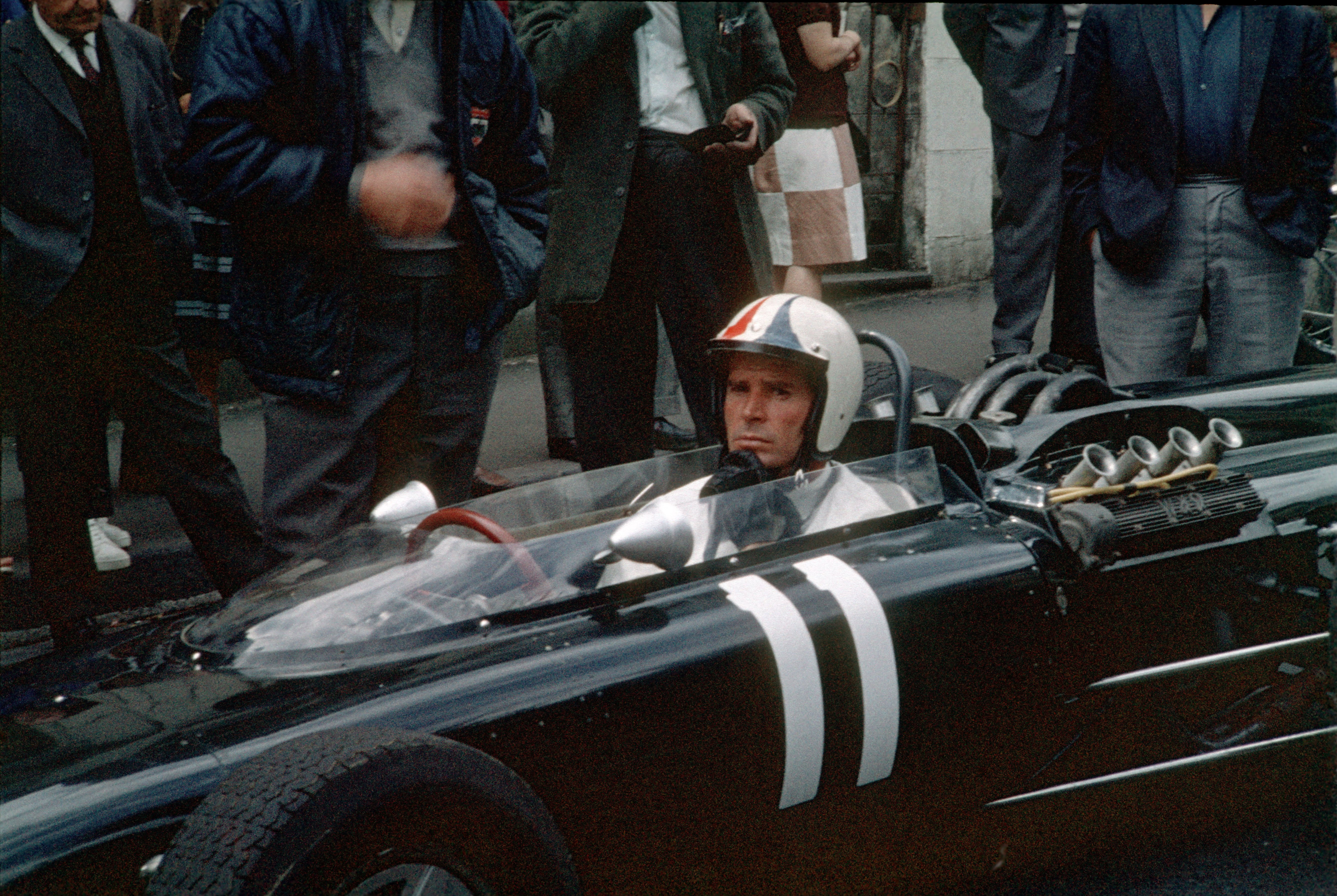
Garner starred as a championship Formula One driver in the major 1966 Hollywood hit Grand Prix, getting considerable experience behind the wheel of a rear-engined Formula Three car

In 1969 James Garner (born 1928) was a veteran Hollywood leading man of both film and television. At the peak of his popularity, he found his interest drifting from his acting career and into the sport of auto racing - in the day an extremely popular international scene in which he had played a starring role as a Formula One champion in the 1966 big screen hit Grand Prix.

Garner wasn't alone in pursuing auto racing as a diversion from movie and TV-making, being joined by such Hollywood figures as A-list star Paul Newman, a four-time Sports Car Club of America (SCCA) champion and number two finisher in the 1979 24 Hours of Le Mans, and big screen action hero Steve McQueen, who raced both motorcycles and cars. Garner and comedian Dick Smothers (who appears in The Racing Scene) even took the same high-speed driving course together in 1968, run by NASCAR legend and 55-time champion Curtis Turner on the Charlotte Motor Speedway in North Carolina. McQueen went on to fund his own Formula racing movie, 1971's Le Mans, about a fictional (1970) 24 Hours of Le Mans in which he drove wheel-to-wheel with some of the top professionals of the day on the actual endurance track in France during filming.

Driving Formula cars in staged racing sequences in Grand Prix gave Garner experience in high-adrenalin wheel-to-wheel racing. He caught the bug bad enough that following his 1968 race track training he formed his own racing team, and by 1969 was financing a variety of different platforms in racing series in North America, including getting some limited competitive time of his own behind the wheel.

== Plot ==
The Racing Scene is produced in documentary fashion, narrated by Garner, covering a slice of his 1969 racing life as owner of the American International Racing team he had created the year before.

He is first seen roaring across the Mexican outback in a heavily modified 650 horsepower Ford Bronco in the 1969 Baja 1000 offroad race, along with trusted co-driver and "hard-charger" Scooter Patrick. One of six similar Bronco teams he's sponsoring, they come in 4th in their class.

Following a media and celebrity-filled public debut for his racing team, he flies to England and on to Silverstone raceway to check on the shakedown of an open-wheel, 5-litre, V8-powered Formula A car he was having built for his team by Formula One champion John Surtees and top designer Len Terry for North American SCCA Continental Championship Formula 5000 series racing.

Cut to the 1969 24 Hours of Daytona in Daytona, Florida. Garner is seen as an owner amid the pit crew of a two-car endurance racing team campaigning a matching pair of Traco-built Chevrolet 302 V8-powered Lola T70 Mk 3b coupes. The $350,000 cars are of last year's design, which is more reliable than the high-strung 1969 Lola, and outlast all the over-stressed but superior performing Ford GT40s and Porsche 908s, earning 2nd and 7th place finishes. Shortly after the same cars and a different combination of co-drivers are in Sebring, set-up and modified for the flat-tracked 12 Hours of Sebring run on a former airfield there. The cars start off well but Patrick drops out early on and the other team ends up placing 7th.

Garner departs the team to make a film in Europe; while he is gone two of his drivers keep busy in various Formula A, Can Am, and Trans Am races, Patrick is winning some in his orbit, and John Surtees has his Team Surtees Formula A cars "running like a bandit" according to Garner, and bagging some hardware on their circuit.

A re-energized team-owner is en route over the Golden Gate Bridge to meet his top lieutenants at the Sears Point Raceway in northern California, having taken possession of its prize new Surtees Garner TS5 Formula A car (TS for "Team Surtees" and 5 for the maximum engine capacity in litres allowed in Formula 5000, which North American Formula A racing falls under). Powered by a Traco Engineering (of Culver City, California) built 450 hp 302 cu. in. small-block Chevy V8, it needed a complete going over, being busily ramrodded by Patrick. Excited to get behind the wheel for some high-speed laps, Garner confirms the car needs some major suspension adjustments ahead of its upcoming debut just a week off, a SCCA Continental Championship Trans Am race at the Lime Rock circuit clear across the U.S. in Connecticut.

After shaking the most obvious bugs out in California Patterson flies east with Garner while the crew tows the car cross-country behind a Winnebago. Patrick breaks the news mid-flight that the car will be so late in arriving that there will be functionally no time for final adjustments. Compounding things once there, serious unexpected distributor problems encountered during testing prevent it from even completing its required qualifying run; after some four-figure emergency triage the car starts dead last in a pack of 20 entrants, the penalty for not having qualified. Through skillful and competitive driving by Patrick it moves up to 11th, but driven too hard the engine blows and he is out of the race.

Garner returns to California to acquire a replacement, and vents some steam off from his increasingly costly and still only marginally successful racing adventure tearing a sand rail over the Algodones Dunes in southeastern California near the Arizona-Mexico border.

Just six days after Lime Rock the crew is back on the track for the St Jovite F5000 in Canada, north of Montreal at the Circuit Mont-Tremblant racetrack at St. Jovite near the Mont Tremblant Resort. It is the 9th of 11 races in the 1969 SCCA Continental Championship season, and the crew has put considerable effort into getting the car right for the course. Believing they are competitive enough to vie for the winner's trophy everyone is hopeful when Patrick takes off 16th in a field of 27 racers. However, halfway through the 1st lap an eight-car pileup caused by an out-of-control racer knocks the Garner car out.

Saying he's OK with a rough road and its challenges, Garner walks off to take on whatever's next for his racing team, doubling-down with a final affirmation, "This is my road. The one I choose. The one I follow."

== Postscript ==
Garner's American International Racing team continued entering events through 1970, campaigning (at least) a pair of Eagle-Chevrolets (driven by Davey Jordan and Rex Ramsey) in a total of 17 Formula 5000 races. Jordan entered five, placing as high as 2nd at the Riverside F5000, while Ramsey raced in 12, with a high of 3rd place at the Sears Point F5000.

Andy Sidaris continued in sports direction after this picture, including coordinating Olympic coverage for ABC and winning several Emmys, before moving on to directing exploitative B-pictures in the 1980s, and some episodic television direction.

== See also ==
- List of American films of 1969

== Sources ==
- Coffman, Jason (2012), "The Early Films of Andy Sidaris", Cashiers du Cinemart Issue 17, Impossibly Funky Productions, ISBN 978-1300351405
