= Bobby Robson =

English footballer and manager (1933–2009)

Sir Bobby Robson CBE
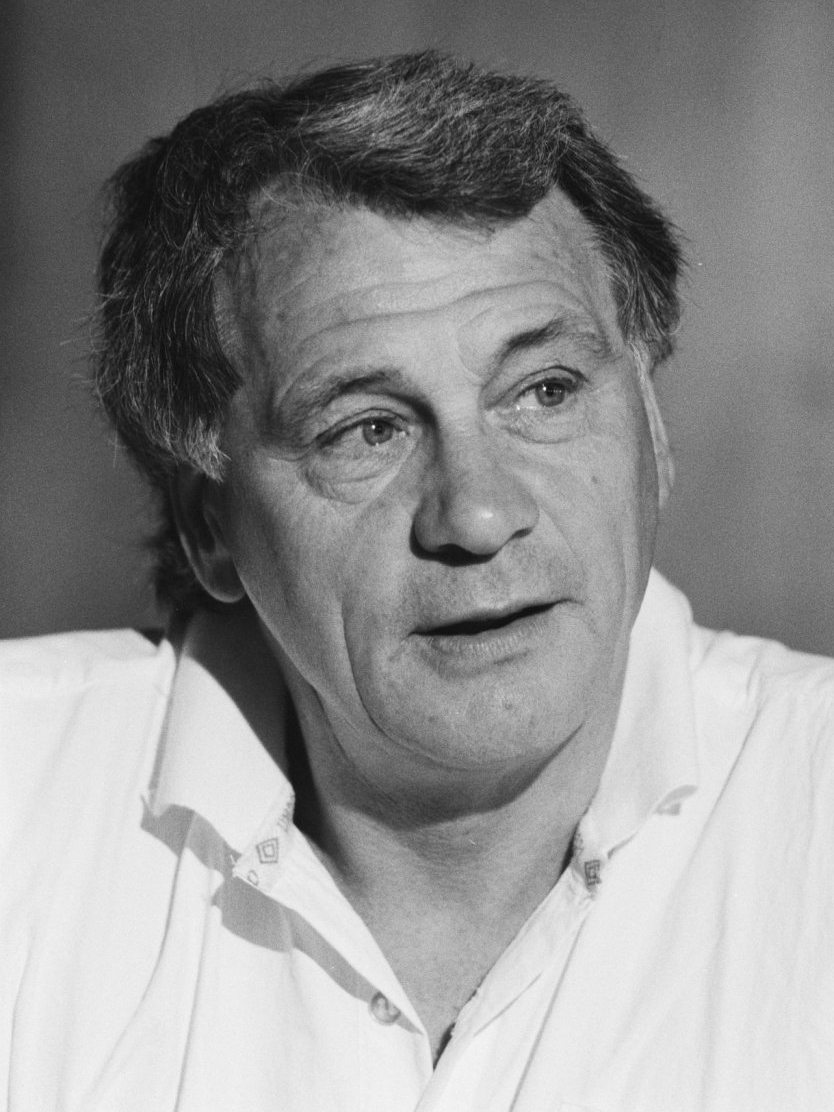
- Robson in 1988

Personal information
- Full name: Robert William Robson
- Date of birth: 18 February 1933
- Place of birth: Sacriston, County Durham, England
- Date of death: 31 July 2009 (aged 76)
- Place of death: Beamish, County Durham, England
- Height: 1.82 m (6 ft 0 in)
- Position: Inside forward

Youth career
- 1944–1950: Langley Park Juniors

Senior career*
Years	Team	Apps	(Gls)
1950–1956	Fulham	152	(68)
1956–1962	West Bromwich Albion	239	(56)
1962–1967	Fulham	192	(9)
1967–1968	Vancouver Royal Canadians	0	(0)
Total		583	(133)

International career
1957–1962	England	20	(4)

Managerial career
- 1967: Vancouver Royal Canadians
- 1968: Fulham
- 1969–1982: Ipswich Town
- 1982–1990: England
- 1990–1992: PSV Eindhoven
- 1992–1994: Sporting CP
- 1994–1996: Porto
- 1996–1997: Barcelona
- 1998–1999: PSV Eindhoven
- 1999–2004: Newcastle United
- * Club domestic league appearances and goals

Sir Robert William Robson (18 February 1933 – 31 July 2009) was an English football player and coach. His career included periods playing for and later managing the England national team and being a UEFA Cup-winning manager at Ipswich Town.

Robson's professional playing career as an inside forward spanned nearly 20 years, during which he played for three clubs: Fulham, West Bromwich Albion, and, briefly, Vancouver Royals. He also made 20 appearances for England, scoring four goals. After his playing career, he found success as both a club and international manager, winning league championships in both the Netherlands and Portugal, earning trophies in England and Spain, and taking England to the semi-finals of the 1990 FIFA World Cup, which remained the national team's best run in a World Cup since 1966 until they reached the semi-finals of the 2018 FIFA World Cup. His last management role was as a mentor to the manager of the Republic of Ireland national team, while his final official club job was at boyhood club Newcastle United, which he left in 2004. He held several managerial positions outside of England, most notably one year at Barcelona in 1996–97, as well as stints at PSV, Sporting CP and Porto. He was the last English manager to win a European competition in 1997.

Robson was created a Knight Bachelor in 2002, was inducted as a member of the English Football Hall of Fame in 2003, and was the honorary president of Ipswich Town. From 1991 onwards, he had recurrent medical problems with cancer, and in March 2008, put his name and efforts into the Sir Bobby Robson Foundation, a cancer research charity which had raised over £12 million as of March 2018. In August 2008, his lung cancer was confirmed to be terminal; he said, "My condition is described as static and has not altered since my last bout of chemotherapy... I am going to die sooner rather than later. But then everyone has to go sometime and I have enjoyed every minute." He died just under a year later, in July 2009.

== Early life ==
Bobby Robson was born on 18 February 1933 in Sacriston, County Durham, the fourth of five sons of Philip and Lilian Robson (née Watt). When he was a few months old, Robson's family moved to the nearby village of Langley Park where his father was a coal miner. Their two-bedroom house had no bath and an outside toilet. As a boy, he was often taken by his father to watch Newcastle United play at St James' Park on Saturday afternoons, requiring a 34-mile round trip. Robson described Jackie Milburn and Len Shackleton as his childhood heroes. Both played for Newcastle in the inside-forward position, the position Robson would later assume during his playing career.

Robson attended Langley Park Primary School and then Waterhouses secondary modern school, after failing his eleven-plus but the headmaster did not allow the school football team to join a league. Instead, he began to play for Langley Park Juniors on Saturday mornings at age 11, and by the time he was 15, he was representing the club at under-18 level. Robson played football whenever he possibly could but left school aged 15 to start work as an electrician's apprentice for the National Coal Board in the Langley Park colliery. In May 1950, Bill Dodgin, the manager of Fulham, made a personal visit to the Robson household to offer Bobby a professional contract. Despite being offered a contract by nearby Middlesbrough, the offer made by Dodgin was too attractive to turn down, so he signed for Fulham and moved to London, playing as a wing half and inside forward. Robson had also interested his beloved Newcastle, but he opted to join Fulham as, in his opinion, "Newcastle made no appreciable effort to secure [my] signature." He also thought he stood a better chance of breaking into the first team at Fulham. Robson had partial deafness in one ear, which rendered him ineligible to be called up for national service.

== Playing career ==
=== Club playing career ===
Although Robson had signed professionally, his father insisted he continue to work as an electrician. He spent the day working at the Festival of Britain site and trained three nights a week at Fulham. Eventually, this took its toll on Robson and he gave up his trade for full-time professional football.

In 1950, Robson made his first-team debut for Fulham, recently promoted to the First Division, in a match against Sheffield Wednesday. He came to regard Fulham as "a nice club, a social club...", but "never... a serious, championship-challenging club". Indeed, he and Fulham were relegated from the top-flight in the 1951–52 season, but he made his return to the First Division, four years later, when he signed for Vic Buckingham's West Bromwich Albion in March 1956. The transfer fee of £25,000 was a club record for West Brom at the time.

He made his West Brom debut in a 4–0 home defeat to Manchester City on 10 March 1956. In 1957–58, he was the club's top league goalscorer; his tally of 24 goals included four in a 5–1 win against Burnley. Often playing as a midfielder, he went on to play 257 matches and score 61 goals for West Brom, and he captained the team for the 1960–61 and 1961–62 seasons. However, in August 1962, he returned to Fulham after a disagreement with West Brom vice-chairman Jim Gaunt over his salary. The ongoing dispute over both minimum and maximum wages in the game, instigated by Robson's teammate Jimmy Hill and the Professional Footballers' Association, combined with the birth of Robson's second son, prompted Robson to demand a higher salary. Gaunt refused to negotiate Robson's contract, so Robson placed a transfer request and was sold to Fulham for £20,000 in a deal which doubled his salary. Soon after Robson joined Fulham, the club sold Alan Mullery and Rodney Marsh, meaning Robson's chances of securing any significant honour there were substantially reduced. Robson himself stated, "In all my time as a footballer, I didn't win a thing."

Despite press reports of interest from Arsenal, and the offer of a player-manager role by Southend United, Robson left Fulham in 1967 and accepted a three-year deal with Canada's Vancouver Royals. He was to be player-manager in their inaugural 1968 season in the North American Soccer League (NASL) and believed it "was a chance too good to miss". He began scouting and holding tryout camps for the new team in late 1967. The position proved difficult; a long-distance joint-ownership agreement gave the Hungarian footballer Ferenc Puskás control over the San Francisco section of the squad, while Robson took care of the Vancouver squad. Robson was dissatisfied by this situation and when, in January 1968, Fulham offered him a contract as their manager, he accepted the position at Craven Cottage.

=== International playing career ===
During his first spell at Fulham, Robson participated in two ambassadorial Football Association tours in the West Indies in 1955 and South Africa in 1956. However, it was during his time at West Bromwich Albion that he graduated to the full England squad, with his first call-up in 1956. His manager, Vic Buckingham, advocated the "push and run" approach to the game, a precursor to "total football", and playing this, Robson graduated to the full England squad in 1956, It was also at West Brom when Robson met future England international and assistant coach Don Howe.

Robson went on to make 20 appearances for the England national team, making his debut in a November 1957 victory against France, scoring twice in a 4–0 victory. Although he made a successful debut, he was dropped for England's next match, against Scotland, in favour of Bobby Charlton. However, Robson was selected for the 1958 FIFA World Cup squad, ahead of Nat Lofthouse and Stanley Matthews, but returned from host nation Sweden disappointed after England were defeated by the Soviet Union in a group play-off match.

Following the World Cup, Robson became an established member of the England squad, enjoying considerable success in a period between October 1960 and March 1961 when he played in six England victories, including scoring a goal in the record 9–3 defeat of Scotland at Wembley Stadium. He was selected for the 1962 World Cup finals in Chile, but an injury to his ankle sustained in a pre-tournament friendly against a Chilean club side ruled him out of most of the tournament. As Robson recalled, "I never played for England again... my international career was unfulfilled." His place in the England team was taken by Bobby Moore.

== Managerial career ==
=== Early club management ===
In 1959, the then England manager and the Football Association (FA) director of coaching, Walter Winterbottom, suggested to Robson that he take a coaching course at Lilleshall. He obtained coaching qualifications during his second spell at Fulham, and coached Oxford University A.F.C. Robson made his debut as a manager in January 1968 at his former club Fulham, against Macclesfield Town, then in the Cheshire County League, in the third round of the FA Cup. Fulham were struggling with 16 points from 24 matches. Despite the acquisition of the young Malcolm Macdonald, Robson could not save the club from relegation to the Second Division, and he left them in November with the club sitting twenty-first in the Second Division, one from bottom. He discovered he had been sacked not from the club itself, but from the headline "Robson sacked" on an Evening Standard placard outside Putney station.

=== Ipswich Town ===
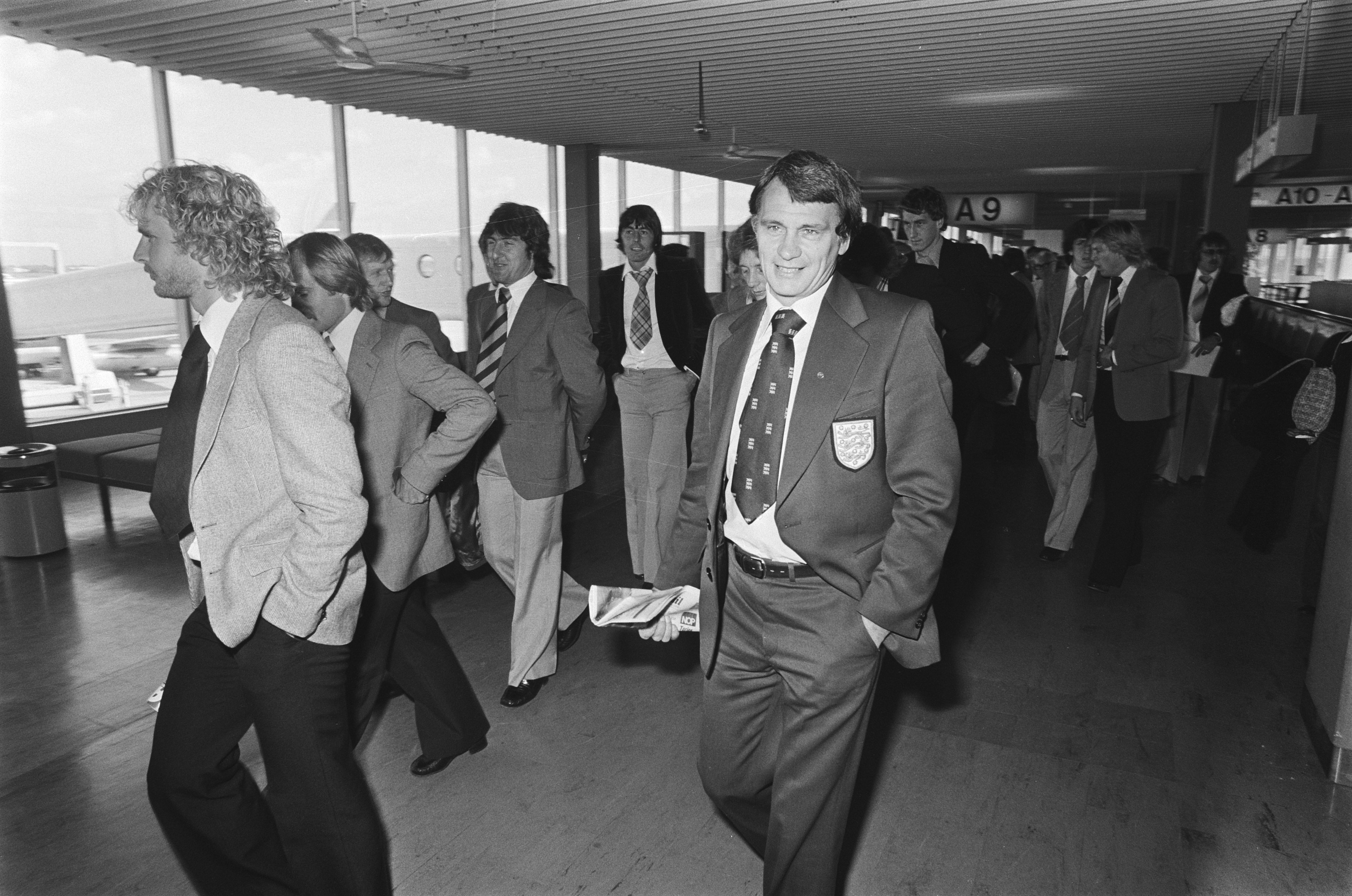
Robson travelling with Ipswich Town, 1978

Robson moved on to Ipswich Town in 1969 and it was there that he established his reputation as a successful manager, supported by the club chairman John Cobbold and then later by his brother Patrick Cobbold. He was offered the vacant job at the Suffolk club after a chance encounter with Town director Murray Sangster while scouting at Portman Road for Chelsea manager Dave Sexton.

After four mediocre seasons, Robson led Ipswich to fourth place in the First Division and success in the Texaco Cup in the 1972–73 season. In the following nine seasons, Ipswich finished lower than sixth place in the First Division only once, in the 1977–78 season. However, that season was a success with a 1–0 victory over Arsenal in the FA Cup final. His reign at Ipswich lasted 13 years, during which time the club twice finished as League runners-up, and made regular appearances in European competitions, winning the UEFA Cup in 1981 with a 5–4 aggregate victory over Dutch side AZ 67 Alkmaar. About that team, Robson said: "We played with two strikers, no wingers, Eric Gates sitting off the front two, two semi-wide midfield players in Arnold Muhren and Frans Thijssen and Johnny Wark sitting in the holding role". During his 13-year tenure, he brought in only 14 players from other clubs, most notably Allan Hunter, Bryan Hamilton and Paul Mariner, relying instead on players developed through Ipswich's youth programmes, including Terry Butcher, George Burley, John Wark, Mick Mills, Colin Viljoen, Alan Brazil, Trevor Whymark, Brian Talbot, Kevin Beattie and Eric Gates, who all went on to play international football. His imports included Dutch players Frans Thijssen and Arnold Mühren. Robson "was not a tactical genius" but he "showed a talent for developing new players, with his good interpersonal skills, caring attitude, hard work and enthusiasm helping them to achieve their best".

In 2002, in recognition of his achievements with the club, a life-size statue of Robson was unveiled opposite the Cobbold Stand of Ipswich Town's ground, Portman Road. On 7 July 2006, Robson was named as honorary president of Ipswich Town Football Club, the first since Lady Blanche Cobbold who had died in 1987.

=== England manager ===
Robson's achievements with Ipswich earned him a job offer from the Football Association for the position of national coach in July 1982, and he declined an offer of a ten-year contract extension and increased salary from Ipswich director Patrick Cobbold. On 7 July 1982, two days after England were knocked out of the 1982 World Cup, he succeeded Ron Greenwood as coach of the England national team, selecting former West Bromwich Albion teammate Don Howe as his chief coach.

Robson's first match in charge saw immediate controversy, as he dropped Kevin Keegan for the match against Denmark. On 21 September 1983, Robson suffered his only loss in the 28 qualifying matches he was to undertake as England manager. The defeat, again to Denmark, ultimately led to England's failure to qualify for the 1984 European Championships and resulted in Robson offering to resign in favour of Brian Clough. The resignation was rejected by FA chairman Bert Millichip (primarily down to his and the FA's disdain for the controversial and outspoken Clough), and Robson went on to lead the England team to qualify for the 1986 World Cup in Mexico.

England made a slow start at the World Cup, and captain Bryan Robson was injured with a recurrence of a dislocated shoulder. Bobby Robson changed the team's tactics for the final match of the first round, selecting Peter Beardsley ahead of Mark Hateley as a strike partner for Gary Lineker. The team won its next two matches, against Poland and Paraguay, 3–0, and qualified for the quarter-finals. England were defeated in the last eight by Argentina with a brace of goals from Diego Maradona, the infamous "Hand of God" goal and the "Goal of the Century" he scored five minutes later. Robson was unimpressed by Maradona's claim of divine intervention:

It wasn't the hand of God. It was the hand of a rascal. God had nothing to do with it... That day, Maradona was diminished in my eyes forever.

Robson's England dropped only one point in qualifying for Euro 1988, which included an 8–0 victory over Turkey. However, this was followed by failure at the tournament itself, held in West Germany, where England were eliminated in the group stage. They finished bottom of their group, succumbing to defeats against the Republic of Ireland, the eventual winners, the Netherlands, and the eventual runners-up, the Soviet Union. Robson was vilified by the British press, and after a draw in a friendly with Saudi Arabia in November 1988, one newspaper demanded, "In the name of Allah, go." Again Robson submitted his resignation, and again it was rejected by Millichip (again the FA's unwillingness to offer the job to Brian Clough is often cited as a reason).

Robson led England without conceding a goal through the six-match qualification for the 1990 World Cup where they were one of six seeded teams. Again they were placed in a group with the Netherlands and the Republic of Ireland, with Egypt the fourth side. As in the 1986 World Cup, Robson was denied the service of his captain, Bryan Robson, who injured his achilles tendon which prevented him playing in the latter stages of the tournament. England topped their group, accumulating four points from their three matches. However, their progress was not without controversy. England changed formation from their traditional 4–4–2 to 5–3–2 incorporating a sweeper, with some sources suggesting this was due to player revolt after the 1–1 draw in the first match with the Republic of Ireland. Robson denied this claim:

...I made the switch, not them. I had no intention of allowing van Basten and Gullit to rip holes in us...

This was followed by victories over Belgium and Cameroon in the knock-out stages, to set up a semi-final with West Germany. England lost the match on a penalty shoot-out, after the score had been tied at 1–1 following extra time. Robson said afterwards: "Not a day goes by when I do not think about the semi-final against Germany and other choices I might have made" Robson was the second coach, after Alf Ramsey, to take England to a World Cup semi-final, and the first coach to do so on foreign soil, an achievement not equalled until Gareth Southgate's team reached the semi-finals of the 2018 World Cup.

Robson's final game in charge of England was the third-place play off against hosts Italy, which England lost 2–1. He then took on the role as manager of PSV Eindhoven, and Graham Taylor was announced as his successor.

=== European club management ===
Before the 1990 World Cup, the FA told Robson it would not renew his contract as England manager, so he moved to the Netherlands to coach PSV Eindhoven, succeeding manager Guus Hiddink, who had left the team after leading them to European Cup victory and four consecutive Eredivisie titles. PSV sought a manager capable of instilling discipline into a fractious squad, much as Hiddink had done previously. Robson described the move as "a culture shock" but felt "a sense of adventure". News of Robson's new position in the Netherlands became public before the start of the 1990 World Cup, leading to tabloid stories impugning Robson's patriotism; he sued Today for calling him a "traitor".

The Dutch penchant for tactical debate surprised Robson. In an interview with Voetbal International, he lamented: "An English pro accepts the manager's decision. After every match here, the substitutes come and visit me." Another of his challenges at PSV was handling the Brazilian international Romário. Robson became frustrated with the Brazilian's work ethic, although admitted "in some matches he would be scintillating". Robson arranged showdown talks with Romário, with Frank Arnesen, Robson's assistant, acting as a translator. The talks proved unsuccessful, with Romário unwilling to change his lifestyle. Despite this, PSV won the Eredivisie in both the 1990–91 and 1991–92 seasons. However, the team did not make the progress expected by the board in European competitions and Robson was informed he would be leaving the club at the end of the 1991–92 season.

Robson moved to Sporting CP in July 1992, where his Portuguese interpreter was a young José Mourinho. Robson guided the club to a third-place finish in his first season in charge while admitting the club was in "a terrible state". He described the club's president as a "loose cannon" who frequently signed players without Robson's consent. Robson was sacked in December 1993, with the club sitting at the top of the league table. Club president Sousa Cintra cited the club's early exit from the UEFA Cup, at the hands of Casino Salzburg, as the reason for his dismissal.

League finishes for clubs managed by Robson (* indicates Robson left the club before the end of the season)

Sporting CP's rivals Porto quickly hired Robson, with Mourinho appointed as his assistant manager. Living in the same apartment block at the time was another future Porto, Chelsea and Tottenham Hotspur manager, the young André Villas-Boas, who, aged 16, introduced himself to Robson. Robson subsequently appointed Villas-Boas to work in the Porto observation department and helped him gain his UEFA "C" coaching badge in Scotland, despite him technically being ineligible as he was aged 17. Porto were in a poor state when Robson arrived and the average attendance had dwindled to 10,000. The club promptly went on to beat Robson's former club, Sporting CP, in the Taça de Portugal final, following that achievement with successive League titles in the 1994–95 and 1995–96 seasons.

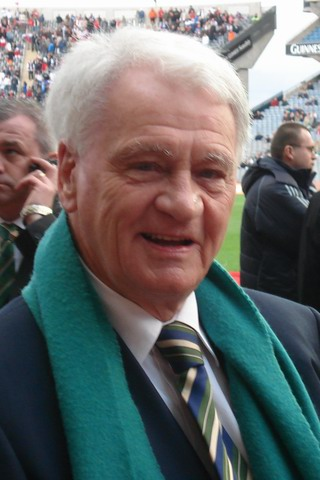
Sir Bobby Robson at the Republic of Ireland versus Slovakia match in Croke Park, Dublin on 29 March 2007

Such was the impact of Robson at Porto, he became known to the locals as "Bobby Five-O" in honour of the number of matches Porto won 5–0, and he signed a new contract with the club in 1995. Robson had melanoma and missed the first few months of the 1995–96 season. He still successfully led Porto in defence of their league title.

A phone call during the summer of 1996 from Barcelona vice-president Joan Gaspart to discuss Luís Figo resulted in an offer of employment with the Spanish club. Robson took over in July 1996, where again his assistant was Mourinho; Robson had made Mourinho's move with him to the Camp Nou a condition of his employment. One of the key decisions Robson made during his brief tenure at Barcelona was the US$19.5 million signing of Ronaldo, who was influential in a season when Barcelona won the Copa del Rey, Supercopa de España and UEFA Cup Winners' Cup. Robson himself was voted European Manager of the Year for 1996–97, while Ronaldo stated, "as a trainer without doubt [Robson] is one of the greatest in the world".

The 1997–98 season saw Robson moved "upstairs" to the general manager position, with Louis van Gaal taking over as manager, but Robson stayed in this position for only one season before returning to manage PSV on a short-term deal for the 1998–99 season. PSV missed out on the league title, finishing third behind Feyenoord and Willem II, but Robson still led the club to victory in the Johan Cruyff Shield and also qualification for the UEFA Champions League on the last day of the season.

=== Return to England ===
After Robson's contract with PSV expired, he returned to England to take up a position in the Football Association's technical department. Following the resignation of Ruud Gullit as Newcastle United manager, Robson moved to St James' Park in September 1999. Robson was disappointed with the club's opening salary offer, stating, "[I]t was miles below the going rate," but negotiated a one-year, £1 million deal.

In Robson's first home match in charge, bottom-placed Newcastle faced second bottom Sheffield Wednesday, thrashing them 8–0. In his first season in charge, 1999–2000, Robson led the club to an 11th-place finish, with 14 wins from his 32 matches in charge. In late 2000, following the resignation of ex-Magpies boss Kevin Keegan as England manager, the FA asked Newcastle club chairman Freddy Shepherd to permit Robson to take over in a part-time caretaker capacity, but the request was refused. Robson guided Newcastle from bottom of the Premier League to a fourth-place finish in the 2001–02 season. The following season, Newcastle finished third, ensuring qualification for the UEFA Champions League for the second consecutive year. However, Robson was unable to guide Newcastle through the Champions League qualifying rounds, and the club was dropped to participate in the UEFA Cup for the 2003–04 season. At the end of the 2003–04 season, Newcastle finished fifth in the table, five points short of the Champions League qualifying fourth place but reached the semi-finals of the UEFA Cup before losing to Marseille.

Robson held the Newcastle post until 30 August 2004, when he was dismissed by Freddy Shepherd, after a poor start to the Premier League season and alleged discontent in the dressing room. Robson's dismissal followed publication of his off the record observation of his disappointment that only 5,000 fans stayed to see the traditional lap of honour made by the players at St James' Park at the end of the previous season. However, he remains held in the highest esteem by some fans; he was granted the Freedom of the City of Newcastle upon Tyne on 2 March 2005.

What is a club in any case? Not the buildings or the directors or the people who are paid to represent it. It's not the television contracts, get-out clauses, marketing departments or executive boxes. It's the noise, the passion, the feeling of belonging, the pride in your city. It's a small boy clambering up stadium steps for the very first time, gripping his father's hand, gawping at that hallowed stretch of turf beneath him and, without being able to do a thing about it, falling in love.

– Robson

Robson's second autobiography, entitled Bobby Robson: Farewell but not Goodbye was released in 2005. The title is based on one of his quotes upon leaving the England job in 1990: "I'm here to say goodbye—maybe not goodbye but farewell." Robson was critical of Shepherd in the book, claiming that he was denied information regarding the players' contracts and transfer negotiations by Shepherd while Robson was manager. He also criticised Shepherd and the club's deputy chairman Douglas Hall, for their focus on the first team and St James' Park, causing them to neglect less glamorous issues, such as the training ground, youth development and talent scouts. The club's training ground was later blamed by Graeme Souness, Robson's successor, for a series of injuries to first team players.

=== Football consultant for Republic of Ireland and retirement ===
On 7 June 2005, Robson declined the invitation to become director of football of Heart of Midlothian because he wanted to stay in the Newcastle area. On 13 January 2006, Steve Staunton was appointed manager of the Republic of Ireland national team, with Robson named in a support role as "international football consultant". Robson stepped down from his role of consultant on 17 November 2007 following the nation's final match in their unsuccessful qualifying campaign for Euro 2008. Robson was a former vice president of the League Managers Association, a non-executive role.

== Style of management ==
Robson was known for his man-management skills, his composed and demanding yet caring style as a coach, and for his ability to motivate his players and build positive relationships with them, making him a well-liked figure among fans and players alike. His profile on the website of the "National Football Museum Hall of Fame" describes him as "a tough taskmaster," who was "fiercely loyal to those who gave their all, and never failed to get the very best out of his players." Gary Lineker opined that Robson "wasn't the greatest tactician of world football," but that "he had a good understanding of the game," describing him with the following words: "He was fiercely loyal to the players who served him well, he understood the game and he had this magnetic enthusiasm, not just for football, but for everything in life. You just wanted to go out there and run yourself into the ground for him and the team." Mourinho, who initially served as an interpreter and later as an assistant coach under Robson at Barcelona, praised him for his leadership and for his methodology in the attacking phase of the game. His style also influenced Villas-Boas, who worked under him at Porto. Robson often used a 4–4–2 formation throughout his career. At Ipswich Town, however, he had used a 4–4–2 diamond, without wingers, and with a holding midfielder, and an attacking midfielder behind the strikers. During the 1990 World Cup, he also changed England's set-up and used a 3–5–2/5–3–2 formation with a sweeper.

== Life outside football ==
=== Personal life ===
Robson met Elsie Gray on a trip back to his parents' home in Langley Park. Gray was a student nurse, and later a teacher. They were married on 25 June 1955 with Fulham teammate Tom Wilson as Robson's best man. They had three sons: Andrew, Paul and Mark.

After 1991, Robson was repeatedly diagnosed with cancer. He had several operations and in 2006 was operated on for a brain tumour. This, on occasion, affected his work; while at Porto, for example, Robson had melanoma, which resulted in his missing the first few months of the 1995–96 season. On 17 October 2006, it was revealed that Robson had been given the all-clear and was set to see out his contract as consultant to the Irish team. Robson revealed on 7 May 2007 he had been diagnosed with cancer for the fifth time. On 17 May 2008, Robson was the guest of honour at the 2008 FA Cup Final at Wembley Stadium when Portsmouth defeated Cardiff City 1–0. He presented the trophy to the victorious captain, Sol Campbell.

=== Other activities ===
Robson made a number of product endorsements, including an appearance in Carlsberg's "Best Pub Side" television commercial. He also acted as a pundit for ITV during the 2002 World Cup and Euro 2004.

=== Bobby Robson Foundation ===
Robson defeated bowel cancer in 1992, a melanoma in 1995, as well as a tumour in his right lung and a brain tumour, both in 2006. Treatment of these conditions had left him partially paralysed due to a stroke caused by the brain tumour, and also with a partially prosthetic upper jaw after the melanoma was surgically removed. His fifth diagnosis of cancer in 2007, consisting of cancerous nodules in both lungs, was diagnosed as terminal in February 2007, and as of December 2008, was being controlled through bouts of chemotherapy. After these experiences, and following his fifth diagnosis with cancer, Robson devoted the remaining years of his life to helping fight the disease. On 25 March 2008, he launched the Sir Bobby Robson Foundation. The Foundation raised over £1 million, which funded equipment for the Sir Bobby Robson Cancer Trials Research Centre, in the Freeman Hospital in Newcastle upon Tyne, and would go on to fund other cancer projects in the North East of England.

In aid of the Foundation, Robson's 1990 World Cup semi-final 4–3 loss after penalties against West Germany was replayed on 26 July 2009 as the Sir Bobby Robson Trophy match at St James' Park, featuring players from the original 1990 World Cup squads and other special guests. Robson was given a guard of honour before the match, which finished 3–2 to the England side.

At the time of Robson's death, the Foundation had raised £1.6 million. Donations totalling £156,000 were received by the Foundation in the 18 days following his death, and on 15 October 2009, it was announced the Foundation had raised over £2 million, and that at the request of Robson's family, Alan Shearer would take over Robson's role as the Foundation's patron. It passed the £2.5 million mark in September 2010. Three other patrons were added in 2010, Steve Gibson, Mick Mills and Niall Quinn.

== Death ==
On 31 July 2009, Robson died of lung cancer at his home in Beamish, County Durham, aged 76, after a long battle with the disease. After the news of his death, leading figures from the world of football and politics paid tribute to him. Manchester United manager Sir Alex Ferguson called him a "great friend, a wonderful individual and tremendous football man". UEFA president Michel Platini said: "He will be remembered not only for his playing career and his outstanding managerial career at both club and international level, but also because he was a truly warm and passionate human being." Gary Lineker said, "It is a sad day and a great loss. He was a wonderful man and will be deeply missed by everybody in the country. I never played for a more enthusiastic man. He gave so much to the game." Former Prime Minister of the United Kingdom Tony Blair described Robson as a "real Geordie gentleman". According to the then-Prime Minister Gordon Brown, Robson "epitomised everything that is great about football in this country". His friend, the broadcaster Michael Parkinson, said, "Robson will be remembered long after the present lot are old bones. By his decency, his humour, his love of the game's traditions and origins and confusion at what it had become, he made present day football look what it is – shabby by comparison. I can think of no more fitting epitaph."

Robson's funeral, a private family ceremony, took place on 5 August 2009. The location remained undisclosed at the request of his family until the funeral had taken place. It was later revealed to be Esh, County Durham. A thanksgiving service for Robson was held on 21 September 2009 at Durham Cathedral. One thousand invited guests attended the service, which was also broadcast live on national television, and to Newcastle United's St James' Park, Ipswich Town's Portman Road ground and Fulham's Craven Cottage.

== Achievements ==
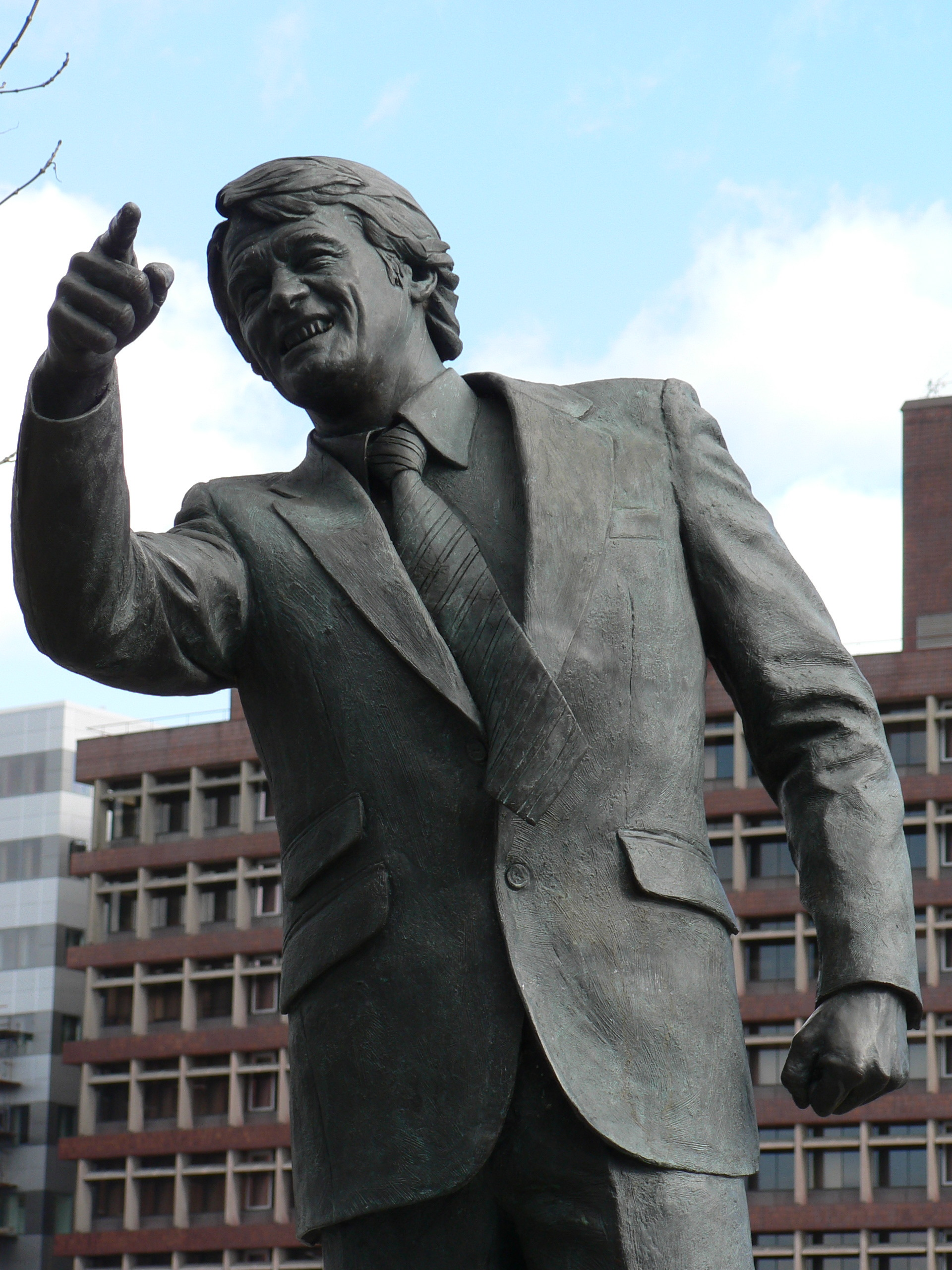
Statue of Robson at Portman Road in Ipswich

Robson was awarded a number of honours for his contributions to football. In 1990, at the end of his eight-year reign as England manager, he was appointed a CBE in 1991 and in 2002, he was knighted; both awards were for services to football.

In 2002 (during his time as Newcastle manager), the 69-year-old Robson was awarded the freedom of Newcastle upon Tyne and the UEFA President's Award for "services to football". He was inducted into the English Football Hall of Fame in 2003 in recognition of his impact as a manager. Following his time as Newcastle United manager in 2005, Robson was made an Honorary Freeman of Newcastle, which, in his autobiography, he described as being "the proudest moment of my life". Robson also won the 1992 Football Writers' Association Tribute Award for an outstanding contribution to the national game, and the 2001 British Sports Writers' Association Pat Besford Trophy for Outstanding Achievement. In 2005, he received a lifetime achievement award from the Sports Coach UK Awards, and was also awarded the Eircom International Personality of the Year in 2006. On 9 December 2007, Robson was awarded the Lifetime Achievement Award at the BBC's Sports Personality of the Year show in recognition of "his contribution as both player and manager in a career spanning more than half a century".

On 5 May 2008, during the 30th anniversary celebrations of Ipswich Town's 1978 FA Cup win, Robson was granted the Freedom of Ipswich by the Lady Mayor. On 8 December 2008, he earned another such accolade when he was given the Freedom of the City of Durham. In March 2009, UEFA awarded Robson the Emerald UEFA Order of Merit award, awarded to "individuals who have dedicated their talents to the good of the game". The award was presented to Robson at St James' Park on 26 July 2009, prior to the Sir Bobby Robson Trophy match, and just five days before his death.

=== Posthumous honours ===
In December 2009, Robson was posthumously awarded the FIFA Fair Play Award, for the "gentlemanly qualities he showed throughout his career as a player and coach". All English football league matches held a one minute's applause in his memory at the beginning of the 2009–10 season.

The Football League gave Newcastle United and Ipswich Town special dispensation to wear special commemorative kits for their Championship match on 26 September 2009 at Portman Road, in aid of Sir Bobby's Foundation. At half-time during this match, the North Stand of Portman Road was renamed the Sir Bobby Robson Stand.

The first anniversary of Robson's death on 31 July 2010 was marked with a ceremony and pre-season friendly match at Newcastle's St James' Park, between two of his former clubs Newcastle United and PSV Eindhoven, involving Robson's PSV captain Stan Valckx presenting a PSV shirt to the club.

In July 2010, plans were unveiled for a memorial garden to Robson to be built in Newcastle. It was to be created by the city council in partnership with the regeneration company NE1Ltd, and located on Gallowgate street close to the Newcastle United stadium St James' Park. Work began on the site in November 2010, which was completed by Spring 2011. The garden covers 400 square meters, and features a tiered seating area and sculpted stone plinths reflecting aspects of his life and work. The area also hosts 400 square metre memorial garden to Sir Bobby Robson.

With a keen interest in cricket as well as football, Robson was to have replaced Mike Gatting as president of the Lord's Taverners charity and cricket club in 2007, but this was prevented by his ill-health. After his death, the club held a dinner in his honour, as "The best President we never had".

In March 2011, the East Coast train operating company named one of its Class 91 electric locomotives Sir Bobby Robson, unveiled at Newcastle station by his widow Elsie and Alan Shearer. Similarly, in December 2011, the Port of Tyne Authority named its new work boat the Sir Bobby Robson. On 6 May 2012, a statue of Robson created by sculptor Tom Maley was unveiled at St James' Park before a 2–0 defeat to eventual champions Manchester City. On 16 July 2013, marking the 150th anniversary celebrations of the FA, the FA designated 10 August as the Sir Bobby Robson National Football Day, celebrated as a day to celebrate the national game. In 2018, Bobby Robson: More Than A Manager, a feature-length British film about Robson's career and cancer diagnosis, was released to critical acclaim.

In September 2020, the Sir Bobby Robson School opened in Ipswich. The school will serve children aged 8–16 with social, emotional and mental health needs.

== Career statistics ==
=== Club ===
Appearances and goals by club, season and competition
Club	Season	League			FA Cup		League Cup		Total	
Club	Season	Division	Apps	Goals	Apps	Goals	Apps	Goals	Apps	Goals
Fulham	1950–51	First Division	1	0	—		—		1	0
Fulham	1951–52	First Division	16	3	—		—		16	3
Fulham	1952–53	Second Division	35	19	1	0	—		36	19
Fulham	1953–54	Second Division	33	13	1	1	—		34	14
Fulham	1954–55	Second Division	42	23	1	0	—		43	23
Fulham	1955–56	Second Division	25	10	2	0	—		27	10
Fulham	Total		152	68	5	1	0	0	157	69
West Bromwich Albion	1955–56	First Division	10	1	—		—		10	1
West Bromwich Albion	1956–57	First Division	39	12	2	1	—		41	13
West Bromwich Albion	1957–58	First Division	41	24	7	3	—		48	27
West Bromwich Albion	1958–59	First Division	29	4	1	1	—		30	5
West Bromwich Albion	1959–60	First Division	41	6	3	0	—		44	6
West Bromwich Albion	1960–61	First Division	40	5	1	0	—		41	5
West Bromwich Albion	1961–62	First Division	39	4	4	0	—		43	4
West Bromwich Albion	Total		239	56	18	5	—		257	61
Fulham	1962–63	First Division	34	1	2	1	2	0	38	2
Fulham	1963–64	First Division	39	1	2	0	1	0	42	1
Fulham	1964–65	First Division	42	1	2	0	3	1	47	2
Fulham	1965–66	First Division	36	6	—		3	0	39	6
Fulham	1966–67	First Division	41	0	3	0	3	0	47	0
Fulham	Total		192	9	9	1	12	1	213	11
Vancouver Royals	1967	North American Soccer League	—		—		—		—	
Vancouver Royals	1968	North American Soccer League	—		—		—		—	
Career total			583	133	32	7	12	1	627	141

=== International ===
Appearances and goals by national team and year
National team	Year	Apps	Goals
England	1957	1	2
England	1958	4	0
England	1960	6	0
England	1961	8	2
England	1962	1	0
Total		20	4

Scores and results list England's goal tally first, score column indicates score after each Robson goal.

List of international goals scored by Bobby Robson
No.	Date	Venue	Opponent	Score	Result	Competition
1	27 November 1957	Wembley Stadium, London, England	France	2–0	4–0	Friendly
2	27 November 1957	Wembley Stadium, London, England	France	4–0	4–0	Friendly
3	15 April 1961	Wembley Stadium, London, England	Scotland	1–0	9–3	1961 British Home Championship
4	10 May 1961	Wembley Stadium, London, England	Mexico	3–0	8–0	Friendly

== Managerial statistics ==
Managerial record by team and tenure
Team	Nat	From	To	Record				
Team	Nat	From	To	G	W	D	L	Win %
Fulham	(England)	January 1968	November 1968	36	6	9	21	16.67
Ipswich Town	(England)	13 January 1969	18 August 1982	709	316	173	220	44.57
England	(England)	July 1982	July 1990	95	47	30	18	49.47
PSV Eindhoven	(Netherlands)	July 1990	June 1992	76	52	17	7	68.42
Sporting CP	(Portugal)	1 July 1992	7 December 1993	59	34	13	12	57.63
Porto	(Portugal)	30 January 1994	13 July 1996	120	86	23	11	71.67
Barcelona	(Spain)	May 1996	June 1997	58	38	12	8	65.52
PSV Eindhoven	(Netherlands)	July 1998	June 1999	47	24	12	11	51.06
Newcastle United	(England)	2 September 1999	30 August 2004	255	119	64	72	46.67
Total				1,455	722	353	380	49.62

== Honours ==
=== Player ===
England

- British Home Championship: 1957–58 (shared), 1958–59 (shared), 1959–60 (shared), 1960–61

=== Manager ===
Ipswich Town

- FA Cup: 1977–78
- UEFA Cup: 1980–81
- Texaco Cup: 1972–73

PSV Eindhoven

- Eredivisie: 1990–91, 1991–92
- Johan Cruyff Shield: 1998

Porto

- Primeira Divisão: 1994–95, 1995–96
- Taça de Portugal: 1993–94
- Supertaça Cândido de Oliveira: 1994

Barcelona

- Copa del Rey: 1996–97
- Supercopa de España: 1996
- UEFA Cup Winners' Cup: 1996–97

Newcastle United

- UEFA Intertoto Cup runner-up: 2001

England

- British Home Championship: 1982–83
- Rous Cup: 1986, 1988, 1989

Individual

- Rothman's Golden Boot Awards: 1978 Manager of the Year
- FWA Tribute Award: 1992
- European Manager of the Year: 1996–97
- Premier League Manager of the Month: February 2000, August 2000, December 2001, February 2002, January 2003, October 2003
- BSWA Pat Besford Trophy: 2001
- UEFA President's Award: 2002
- LMA Special Merit Award: 2002
- English Football Hall of Fame Inductee: 2003
- PFA Merit Award: 2003
- FAI International Football Awards – International Personality: 2006
- BBC Sports Personality of the Year Lifetime Achievement Award: 2007
- FIFA Fair Play Award: 2009
- FIFA Order of Merit: 2009
- UEFA Order of Merit: 2009
- Ipswich Town Hall of Fame: Inductee 2009

== See also ==
- List of longest managerial reigns in association football
- List of football managers with the most matches

== Bibliography ==
- Robson, Bobby (1982). Time on the Grass. Arthur Barker. ISBN 0-213-16845-6.
- Robson, Bobby (1990). Bobby Robson: An Autobiography. Hutchinson. ISBN 0-09-174499-7.
- Robson, Bobby; Harris, Bob (1998). Bobby Robson: An Englishman Abroad. Macmillan. ISBN 0-330-36985-7.
- Robson, Bobby; Hayward, Paul (2005). Farewell but not Goodbye. Hodder & Stoughton. ISBN 0-340-82346-1.
- Robson, Bobby (2008). Newcastle – My Kind of Toon. Hodder & Stoughton. ISBN 978-0-340-97783-5.

== Sources ==
- "Robson, Bobby". National Football Teams. Benjamin Strack-Zimmermann. (Career statistics)
