= Le Mans (film) =

1971 action film by Lee H. Katzin

- Theatrical release poster by Tom Jung
- Directed by: Lee H. Katzin
- Written by: Harry Kleiner
- Produced by: Jack N. Reddish
- Starring: Steve McQueen
- Cinematography: René Guissart Jr. Robert B. Hauser
- Edited by: Ghislaine Desjonquères; Donald W. Ernst; John Woodcock
- Music by: Michel Legrand
- Production company: Cinema Center Films
- Distributed by: National General Pictures
- Release date: June 23, 1971
- Running time: 106 minutes
- Country: United States
- Language: English
- Budget: $7.6 million (est.)
- Box office: $5.5 million (North American rentals)

Le Mans is a 1971 film depicting a fictional 24 Hours of Le Mans auto race starring Steve McQueen and directed by Lee H. Katzin. The film began as a John Sturges project, before he was replaced during filming. It features actual footage captured during the 1970 race held the previous June.

== Plot ==
Top flight Le Mans racing driver Michael Delaney spots former rival Piero Belgetti's widow Lisa buying flowers in the days before the race. He drives to the scene of the accident that killed her husband the previous year. He has a flashback of Belgetti losing control of his Ferrari, forcing him to crash as well.

Like many others, Lisa appears to feel Delaney was responsible, at least in part, for the accident. At the race, she is understandably downcast while working through her emotions. In an awkward scene, Delaney looks for a place to sit in a nearly empty track commissary, only to ask Lisa if he may join her, claiming that it is the only seat left. There is obvious tension between them, but also respect and a hint of mutual attraction.

After 13 hours of racing, Erich Stahler spins his Ferrari 512 at Indianapolis Corner, causing teammate Claude Aurac's Ferrari 512 to veer off the track in a major accident. Momentarily distracted by the flames of Aurac's car, Delaney reacts too late to safely avoid a slower car, striking the guardrail and bouncing several times across the road, striking the guardrails on each side of the road multiple times, totaling his Porsche 917. Both survive, but Aurac's injuries are extensive and he is medevaced to a hospital by helicopter. Lisa appears at the track clinic where Delaney is briefly treated. She is distraught at his crash, which stirs up emotions from Piero's passing she had been seeking to put in the past. Delaney consoles her and rescues her from a horde of reporters. After he puts her in a waiting car, a journalist asks Delaney whether his and Aurac's crash can be compared to the one with Belgetti in the previous year's race. Delaney merely stares him down.

Porsche driver Johann Ritter senses that his wife Anna would like for him to quit racing. He suggests it, thinking she will be overjoyed. She demurs and says she would like it only if he likes it. He chides her a bit about not being entirely honest. Later, the decision is taken out of his hands when team manager David Townsend replaces him for not being quick enough on the track. Anna tries to comfort him, reminding him that he was planning to quit anyway.

Lisa goes to Delaney's trailer to talk with him. After his brush with death, she is even more drawn to him and despairs that he may meet the same fate as her husband; but Delaney finds the thrill too addictive to quit. Townsend enters and asks him to take over driving Ritter's car. After a moment's unspoken communion with Lisa, he follows Townsend, who tells him, "Michael, I want you to drive flat out. I want Porsche to win Le Mans."

In the closing minutes of the race, the two Porsches and their rival Ferraris vie for the win, with Delaney in the #21 car and teammate Larry Wilson in #22. The Ferrari leading the race retires due to a flat tire, leaving Wilson in the lead and only Delaney's archrival, Stahler, to contend with. The faster pair quickly catches Wilson. Delaney passes Stahler for second place.

Slower traffic in his lane forces Delaney to brake, allowing Stahler to overtake on the left. Delaney drafts the German, then both move alongside Wilson. Delaney takes actions that seem intended to guarantee a 1–2 Porsche win rather than going for first himself. Rather than try to pass Wilson, then possibly Stahler, Delaney switches to the right lane and drafts Wilson, allowing both to pull up with Stahler. For good measure, Delaney bumps Stahler twice. When Stahler tries to pass again, Delaney steers toward him, looking likely to bump Stahler again and send him into the guard rail, forcing him to throttle back and brake to avoid that outcome, thus ensuring the desired 1–2 win for Porsche.

== Cast ==
- Steve McQueen as Michael Delaney, driver of the #20 Porsche 917K
- Siegfried Rauch as Erich Stahler, driver of the #8 Ferrari 512S and Delaney's rival
- Elga Andersen as Lisa Belgetti, widow of Delaney’s Late Rival, Piero Belgetti, who died at Le Mans the previous year
- Ronald Leigh-Hunt as David Townsend, head of Team Porsche
- Fred Haltiner as Johann Ritter, driver of the #21 Porsche
- Luc Merenda as Claude Aurac, driver of the #7 Ferrari whom Lisa is friendly with
- Christopher Waite as Larry Wilson, driver of the #22 Porsche
- Louise Edlind as Mrs. Anna Ritter, Johann's wife
- Angelo Infanti as Lugo Abratte, driver of the #5 Ferrari
- Jean-Claude Bercq as Paul-Jacques Dion, Wilson's co-driver
- Michele Scalera as Vito Scalise, driver of the #6 Ferrari
- Gino Cassani as Loretto Fuselli, head of Team Ferrari
- Alfred Bell as Tommy Hopkins, member of the Porsche crew
- Carlo Cecchi as Paolo Scadenza, member of the Ferrari crew
- Richard Rüdiger as Bruno Frohm, Delaney's co-driver
- Hal Hamilton as Chris Barnett, Aurac's co-driver
- Jonathan Williams as Jonathan Burton, Abratte's co-driver
- Peter Parten as Peter Wiese, Ritter's co-driver
- Conrad Pringle as Tony Elkins, a reporter
- Erich Glavitza as Josef Hauser, Stahler's co-driver
- Peter Huber as Max Kummel, Scalise's co-driver
- Haig Alltounian as Porsche Mechanic (uncredited)
- Norman "Dixie" Dean as Porsche Mechanic (uncredited)

The following drivers did stunts for the movie: Ham Akersloot, Richard Attwood, Claude Ballot-Lena, Christian Baron, Jurgen Barth, Derek Bell, Edgar Berney, Paul Blancpain, Arthur Blank, Jean-Pierre Bodin, Guy Chasseuil, André de Cortanze, Hugues de Fierlant, Vic Elford, Nanni Galli, Erich Glavitza, Masten Gregory, Pierre Greub, Jean-Pierre Hanrioud, René Herzog, Toine Hezemans, Peter Huber, Jacky Ickx, Jean-Pierre Jabouille, Helmut Kelleners, Gerard Larrousse, Herbert Linge, Steve McQueen, John Miles, Silvio Moser, Herbert Müller, Mimmo Neccia, Robin Ormes, Mike Parkes, Aldo Pessina, Teddy Pilette, Brian Redman, Jean Sage, Jo Siffert, Rob Slotemaker, Dieter Spoerry, Rolf Stommelen, and Jonathan Williams.

The credits also include a special thanks to driver David Piper who was injured during filming.

== Production ==
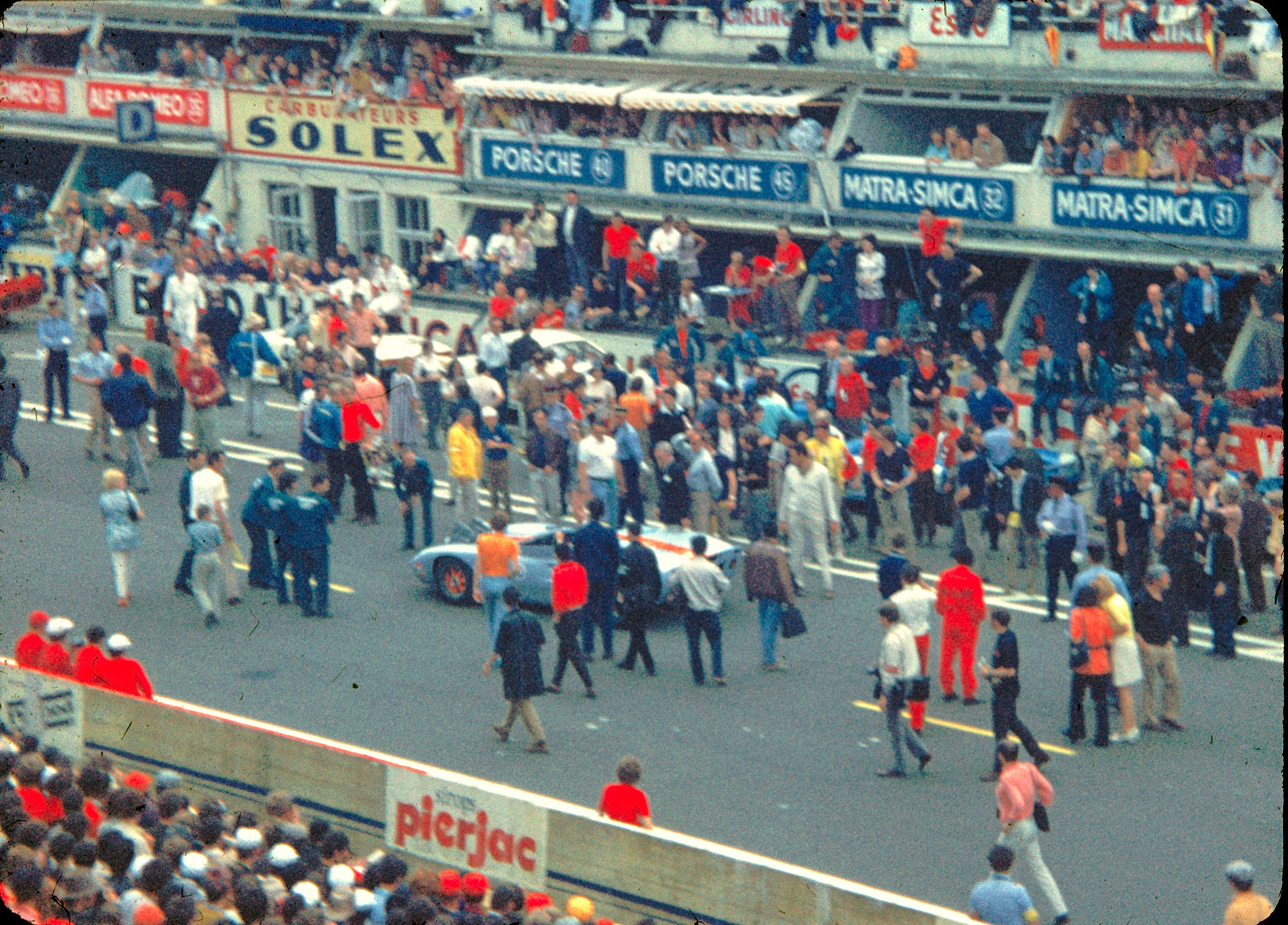
Filming on circuit de la Sarthe, at 24 Hours of Le Mans in 1970

Le Mans was filmed on location on the Le Mans circuit between June and November 1970, including during that season's actual 24 Hours of Le Mans race in mid-June. McQueen had intended to race a Porsche 917 together with Jackie Stewart, but the #26 entry was not accepted. Instead, he is depicted as starting the race in the blue #20 Gulf-Porsche 917K driven by Jo Siffert and Brian Redman. The race-leading white #25 Porsche 917 "Long tail" was piloted by Vic Elford and Kurt Ahrens Jr.

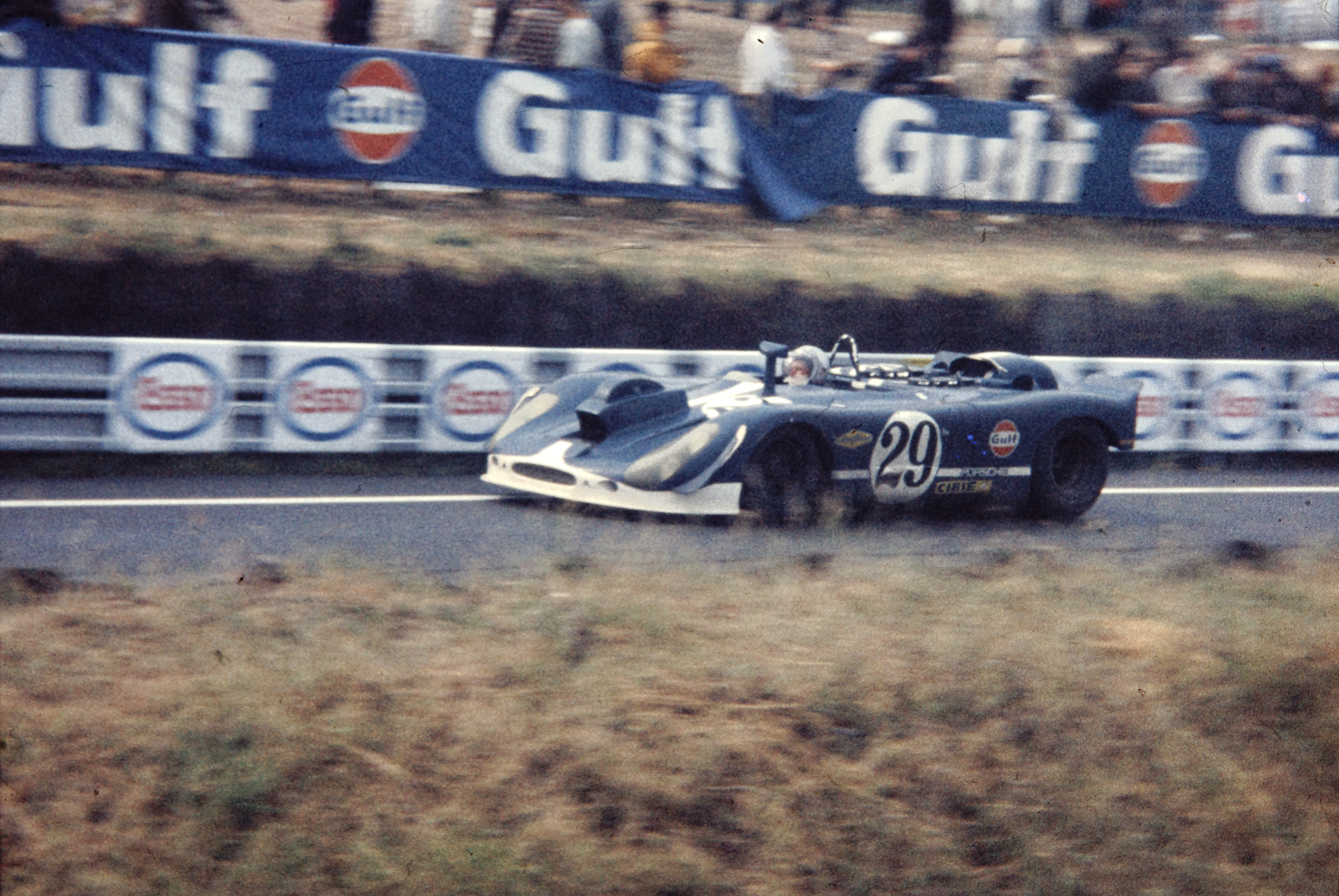
The Solar Productions Porsche 908 during the race. Bulky camera housings are visible at front and rear

The Porsche 908/2, which McQueen had previously co-driven with Peter Revson to a second place in the 12 Hours of Sebring, was entered in the race by McQueen's Solar Productions, complete with heavy movie cameras capturing actual racing footage. This #29 camera car, which can be briefly seen in the starting grid covered with a black sheet (at approximately 17:51), and again at just before the 79-minute mark (at 1:18:42) racing past the starting line, was driven by Porsche's Herbert Linge and Jonathan Williams. It traveled 282 laps, or 3,798 kilometres (2,360 miles), and finished the race in 9th position, but it was not classified, as it had not covered the required minimum distance due to the stops to change film reels. It did, however, manage to finish second in the P3.0 class.

Additional footage shot after the race used actual Porsche 917 and Ferrari 512s in competition liveries. In the crash scenes, comparatively expendable technologically obsolete Lola T70 chassis were fitted with replica Porsche and Ferrari bodywork.

Although depicted as the factory-backed Scuderia Ferrari team, the 512s used were borrowed from Belgian Ferrari distributor Jacques Swaters, after Enzo Ferrari balked at supplying cars due to the script's Porsche team victory. David Piper, driving a camera car 917K that had a camera seat removed, lost a part of a leg as a result of a crash during filming.

McQueen had wanted to employ Christopher Chapman's new multi-dynamic image technique in the film, as had been done at his instigation with The Thomas Crown Affair, in which he starred in 1968. Chapman advised against it, much to McQueen's disappointment; in Chapman's words, "It was much too big a film, with too many writers; it wouldn't work that way."

McQueen and John Sturges planned to make a movie called Day of the Champion, which was going to occur at the same time that Grand Prix was in production; lingering troubles with getting production to start meant that McQueen (who rejected an offer to star in Grand Prix) had to focus on other projects, such as The Sand Pebbles (1966). McQueen formed his own production company, Solar Productions, and came into association with Cinema Center Films to help make the film. Elements of the would-be movie would be re-used in Le Mans, which would start filming in 1970. Unfortunately, Sturges would drop out of the project when Cinema Center did not find the progress of the filming satisfactory (to the point that they wanted to replace McQueen with Robert Redford). Sturges was quoted as saying, "I'm too old and too rich" to put up with trouble. Alan Trustman, hired to write the film after having written for previous McQueen features, such as Bullitt (1968), suffered a falling out with McQueen and was fired from production, which would hinder further attempts in his scriptwriting career. Lee H. Katzin, known for television work, was brought in to finish the project, while McQueen, strapped for resources, had to strike a deal with Cinema Center that saw him lose creative control.

After production, McQueen's main Porsche 917, chassis 022, driven extensively in the film, was sold and raced many times through the 1970s. In 2001, it was purchased for US$1.32 million (equivalent to $2.4 million in 2025), with that owner selling it in 2002 to comedian Jerry Seinfeld. Seinfeld asked Joe Cavaglieri to fully restore it to the 1971 film era in Gulf Porsche team livery. On 18 January 2025, Seinfeld went to Mecum Auctions to auction off the vehicle, where he eventually turned down a bid price of $25 million (equivalent to $25 million in 2025); working with Mecum, he completed a private sale to a private buyer immediately thereafter.

== Reception ==
In The Hollywood Reporter, film critic James Powers wrote:

Le Mans is a class film in every way, attitude, realization, taste. It has visceral emotion but not heart...

It is an unsatisfying film because we know no more about the people at the end than we did at the beginning, in fact, very little at all. Very near the end, Steve McQueen is asked if this driving is worth risking one's life for. He replies that for those men who drive these autos, "it is life … anything before or after is just waiting."

On review aggregation website Rotten Tomatoes, the film holds an approval rating of 71% based on 14 reviews. The movie developed a strong cult reputation.

== Documentary ==
Steve McQueen: The Man & Le Mans is a 2015 documentary film detailing the actor's quest to make the 1971 film Le Mans, complete with interviews from his then-wife Neile Adams McQueen, co-stars Louise Edlind and Siegfried Rauch, and McQueen's son Chad McQueen. It also includes recordings from John Sturges and Steve McQueen.

== See also ==
- Le Mans 1955 (film)
- The Racing Scene
- Grand Prix (film)
- Truth in 24
- Ford v Ferrari
- List of American films of 1971
