= Bobby Robson: More Than a Manager =

Film about a football manager

- Directed by: Gabriel Clarke; Torquil Jones
- Written by: Gabriel Clarke
- Produced by: Torquil Jones; John McKenna; Victoria Barrell
- Starring: Bobby Robson; Elsie Robson; Paul Gascoigne; Alan Shearer; Terry Butcher; Alex Ferguson; John Hall; Jose Mourinho; Pep Guardiola; Gary Lineker; Ronaldo Luís Nazário de Lima
- Cinematography: Andrew White
- Edited by: Steve Williams
- Music by: Jim Copperthwaite
- Production company: Noah Media Group
- Distributed by: NoahX
- Release date: 1 July 2018
- Running time: 99 minutes
- Country: United Kingdom
- Language: English

Bobby Robson: More Than A Manager is a 2018 British feature-length film about the life of former England Manager Bobby Robson, directed by Gabriel Clarke and Torquil Jones. The film was produced by Noah Media Group and was distributed in the UK by NoahX (distribution arm of Noah Media Group). The documentary relies primarily on archive footage of Robson, such as home videos, interviews and archive footage from Robson's managerial career at FC Barcelona, Newcastle United F.C., Ipswich Town F.C., and during his tenure as England Manager. The film partnered with the Sir Bobby Robson Foundation and features interviews from players and managers who worked with Robson.

== Content ==
The film's narrative is focused on the life and death of Bobby Robson as a football manager. The timeline of the film jumps between key points of Robson's managerial career, beginning in 1995. Robson explains the prognosis of his cancer, and the surgery he undertook. His surgeon, Huw Davies, had advised him to retire from Football, but Robson decided to go against the advice and became the manager of FC Barcelona 9 months later.

The documentary illustrates Robson's life beginning with first managerial appointment at Ipswich Town Football Club from 1969, his path as England Manager in 1982, his managing abroad in Holland, Portugal and FC Barcelona, before ending his career with Newcastle United. The film showcases the many accolades Robson had managed to obtain throughout his time as a Football manager. In addition to this, the documentary also depicts Robson's personal life with his family, containing interviews with Elsie and Mark Robson, detailing how Robson's managerial career impacted his family life.

== Release ==
Special preview screenings of the film were held at St James' Park on 22 May, Wembley Stadium on 23 May and Portman Road Stadium on 25 May, featuring Q&As with the directors alongside ex-football players.

The opening preview screenings of the Bobby Robson: More Than A Manager (2018) film were held at the Curzon Cinemas in Soho, London and the Tyneside Cinema, Newcastle on 31 May 2018.

=== Digital and home media ===
The film was released digitally on Amazon and iTunes 1 June 2018, DVD and Blu-ray versions were released on 4 June 2018.

== Reception ==
=== Critical reception ===
Bobby Robson: More Than A Manager received critical acclaim from critics. The film holds a 100% approval rating on the review aggregator Rotten Tomatoes, based on six reviews. The film was given 5 stars out of 5 by Sam Parker from Esquire magazine, expressing that More Than A Manager is "the best sports documentary since Senna". Andrew Pulver from The Guardian gave the film 4 out of 5 stars, writing that Bobby Robson: More Than A Manager is a "portrait of an England icon". Michael Hogan from The Telegraph also gave the film 4 stars out of 5, stating that "As Mourinho says before the credits roll: 'A person only dies when the last person who loves him dies.' By this measure, Bobby Robson lives on and burns bright. More than a manager, he was my hero. Thanks for the memories, boss.'"

=== Accolades ===
Award	Category	Outcome
Sports Journalists' Association	Television Sport or Feature	Won
Grierson Awards	Best Historical Document	Shortlisted
