= Stu Linder =

American film editor (1931–2006)

- Born: Stewart Bridgewater Linder; November 8, 1931; Geneva, Illinois, U.S.
- Died: January 12, 2006 (aged 74); Ridgefield, Connecticut, U.S.
- Occupation: Film editor
- Spouse(s): Cathy Fitzpatrick, Maureen O’Connor

Stewart Bridgewater Linder (November 8, 1931 – January 12, 2006) was an American film editor with 25 credits. He shared the Academy Award for Best Film Editing for the 1966 film Grand Prix (directed by John Frankenheimer), which was the first film on which Linder was credited as an editor.

Linder is particularly noted for his long collaboration (1982–2006) with the director Barry Levinson. Perhaps the best remembered film from their collaboration, extended over 20 films, was Rain Man (1988), which won the Academy Award for Best Picture. Linder won an ACE Eddie award for editing this film, and was nominated for both the Academy Award and the BAFTA Award for Best Editing.

== Death ==
Linder died on January 12, 2006, of a heart attack, at the age of 74.

== Legacy ==
The 2006 film Man of the Year starring Robin Williams is dedicated to Linder's memory. Stu was on location editing this feature when he died of a heart attack. His co-editor, Blair Daily was the first on scene.

== Partial filmography ==
Editor
Year	Film	Director	Notes
1966	Grand Prix	John Frankenheimer	Second collaboration with John Frankenheimer
1968	Blue	Silvio Narizzano	
1975	The Fortune	Mike Nichols	Fourth collaboration with Mike Nichols
1980	My Bodyguard	Tony Bill	First collaboration with Tony Bill
1980	First Family	Buck Henry	
1982	Diner	Barry Levinson	First collaboration with Barry Levinson
1982	Six Weeks	Tony Bill	Second collaboration with Tony Bill
1984	The Natural	Barry Levinson	Second collaboration with Barry Levinson
1985	Code Name: Emerald	Jonathan Sanger	
1985	Young Sherlock Holmes	Barry Levinson	Third collaboration with Barry Levinson
1987	Tin Men	Barry Levinson	Fourth collaboration with Barry Levinson
1987	Good Morning, Vietnam	Barry Levinson	Fifth collaboration with Barry Levinson
1988	Rain Man	Barry Levinson	Sixth collaboration with Barry Levinson
1990	Avalon	Barry Levinson	Seventh collaboration with Barry Levinson
1991	Bugsy	Barry Levinson	Eighth collaboration with Barry Levinson
1992	Toys	Barry Levinson	Ninth collaboration with Barry Levinson
1994	Quiz Show	Robert Redford	
1994	Disclosure	Barry Levinson	Tenth collaboration with Barry Levinson
1996	Sleepers	Barry Levinson	Eleventh collaboration with Barry Levinson
1997	Wag the Dog	Barry Levinson	Twelfth collaboration with Barry Levinson
1998	Sphere	Barry Levinson	Thirteenth collaboration with Barry Levinson
1999	Liberty Heights	Barry Levinson	Fourteenth collaboration with Barry Levinson
2000	An Everlasting Piece	Barry Levinson	Fifteenth collaboration with Barry Levinson
2001	Bandits	Barry Levinson	Sixteenth collaboration with Barry Levinson
2004	Envy	Barry Levinson	Seventeenth collaboration with Barry Levinson

Editorial department
Year	Film	Director	Role	Notes
1961	The Misfits	John Huston	Assistant editor	Uncredited
1962	The Man Who Shot Liberty Valance	John Ford	Assistant editor	Uncredited
1966	Seconds	John Frankenheimer	Assistant film editor	First collaboration with John Frankenheimer
1970	Catch-22	Mike Nichols	Editorial assistant	First collaboration with Mike Nichols
1971	Carnal Knowledge	Mike Nichols	Editorial assistant	Second collaboration with Mike Nichols
1973	The Day of the Dolphin	Mike Nichols	Editorial assistant	Third collaboration with Mike Nichols

Thanks
Year	Film	Director	Role
2006	Man of the Year	Barry Levinson	In memory of

TV pilots

Editor
Year	Film	Director
1983	Diner	Barry Levinson

== See also ==
- List of film director and editor collaborations
