= Henry Berman =

American film editor and producer

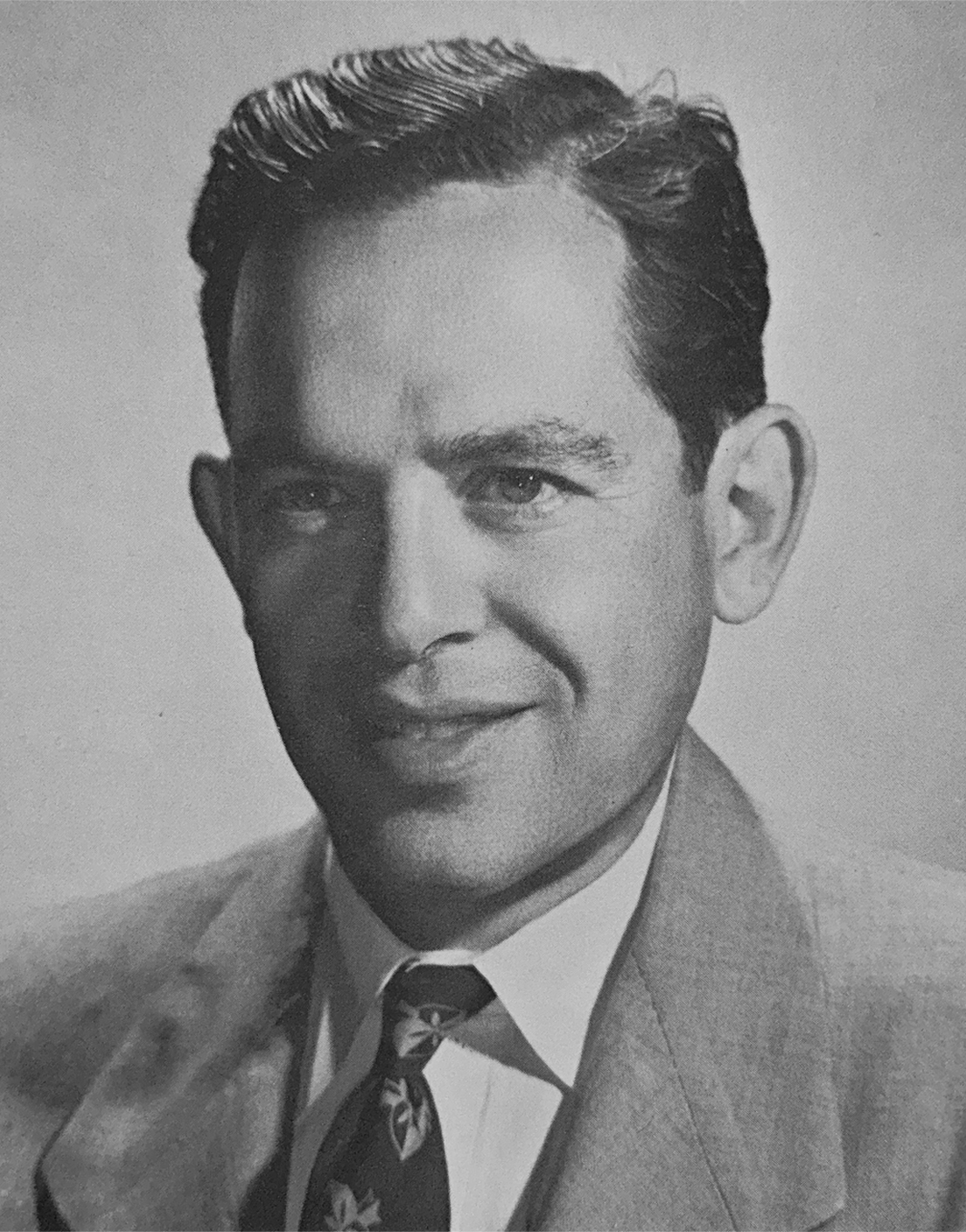
- Born: January 14, 1914; Newcastle, Pennsylvania, U.S.
- Died: June 12, 1979 (aged 65); Los Angeles, California, U.S.
- Occupations: Film editor and producer
- Spouse: Rosemary Anita Cassidy m.1942
- Children: 3 sons, 1 daughter
- Relatives: Pandro S. Berman (brother)

Henry Michael Berman (January 1, 1914 – June 12, 1979) was an American film editor for RKO and a film producer for MGM.

== Early life ==
Henry Berman was born to a Jewish family in Newcastle, Pennsylvania in 1914. His father Henry (Harry) Berman, was general manager of Universal Pictures during Hollywood's formative years.

== Career ==
Henry began his career working in a film laboratory at Consolidated Film Industries in the 1930s. He also worked in the lab for Universal Pictures. In 1933, he joined RKO as an editor and worked on musicals, including the Fred Astaire and Ginger Rogers films Follow the Fleet and Swing Time (both 1936), which were produced by his older brother Pandro S. Berman. He became an assistant to Pandro and moved with him to MGM in 1940.

During World War II, Berman served in the US Army with the rank of captain and worked with Frank Capra on the documentary film series Why We Fight.

Some of the films he produced at MGM after the war include Just This Once (1952), Torch Song (1953), Men of the Fighting Lady (1954), Bedevilled (1955), It's a Dog's Life (1955), and The Great American Pastime (1956).

He won the Academy Award for Best Film Editing for Grand Prix in 1966.

He died in Los Angeles of cancer.

== Awards and nominations ==
Year	Award	Category	Entry	Result	Ref.
1967	39th Academy Awards(Oscars)	Best film editing	Grand Prix (1966)	Won	
1976	Primetime Emmy Awards	Outstanding Achievement in Film Editing for Entertainment Programming for a Special	Babe (1975)	Nominated	
1973	Primetime Emmy Awards	Outstanding Achievement in Film Editing for Entertainment Programming - For a Special or Feature Length Program of a Series	Go Ask Alice (1973)	Nominated	
