= Grand Prix (1966 film) =

1966 film by John Frankenheimer

- Theatrical release poster by Howard Terpning
- Directed by: John Frankenheimer
- Written by: Robert Alan Aurthur; Uncredited: John Frankenheimer; William Hanley
- Produced by: Edward Lewis
- Starring: James Garner; Eva Marie Saint; Yves Montand; Toshiro Mifune; Brian Bedford; Jessica Walter; Antonio Sabàto; Françoise Hardy
- Cinematography: Lionel Lindon
- Edited by: Fredric Steinkamp; Henry Berman; Stewart Linder; Frank Santillo
- Music by: Maurice Jarre
- Production companies: Joel Productions; John Frankenheimer Productions; Cherokee Productions
- Distributed by: Metro-Goldwyn-Mayer
- Release date: December 21, 1966
- Running time: 176 minutes
- Country: United States
- Language: English
- Budget: $9 million
- Box office: $20.8 million

Grand Prix is a 1966 American epic sports drama film about Formula One racing, directed by John Frankenheimer, produced by Edward Lewis, and written by Robert Alan Aurthur with uncredited story contributions by Frankenheimer and rewrites by William Hanley. It stars an international ensemble cast, including James Garner, Eva Marie Saint, Yves Montand, Toshiro Mifune, Brian Bedford, Jessica Walter, Françoise Hardy and Antonio Sabàto.

The film includes real-life racing footage and cameo appearances by drivers including Formula One World Champions Phil Hill, Graham Hill, Juan Manuel Fangio, Jim Clark, Jochen Rindt and Jack Brabham. Other drivers who appeared in the film include Dan Gurney, Lorenzo Bandini, Bob Bondurant, Ludovico Scarfiotti, Richie Ginther, Joakim Bonnier, Bruce McLaren and Jo Siffert. The film was photographed in Super Panavision 70 by Lionel Lindon and presented in 70mm Cinerama in premiere engagements. Its unique racing cinematography is one of the main draws of the film.

One of the ten highest-grossing films of 1966, Grand Prix won three Academy Awards for its technical achievements.

== Plot ==
The story follows four Formula One drivers through a fictionalized version of the 1966 Formula One season:

- Jean-Pierre Sarti (Ferrari) – A Frenchman who has been World Champion twice, is nearing the end of his career and is feeling increasingly cynical about racing itself.
- Pete Aron (first Jordan BRM, then Yamura) – An American attempting to repeat past successes and overcome his reputation as a reckless, second-tier driver; he signs with the newcomer Yamura Motors.
- Scott Stoddard (Jordan BRM) – A British driver recuperating from a bad crash that left him hospitalized; he becomes dogged by recurrent pains while dealing with the emotional turmoil of his rocky marriage.
- Nino Barlini (Ferrari) – A charismatic yet arrogant Italian racer, he's Ferrari's No. 2 driver, being a promising rookie and former world motorcycle champion.

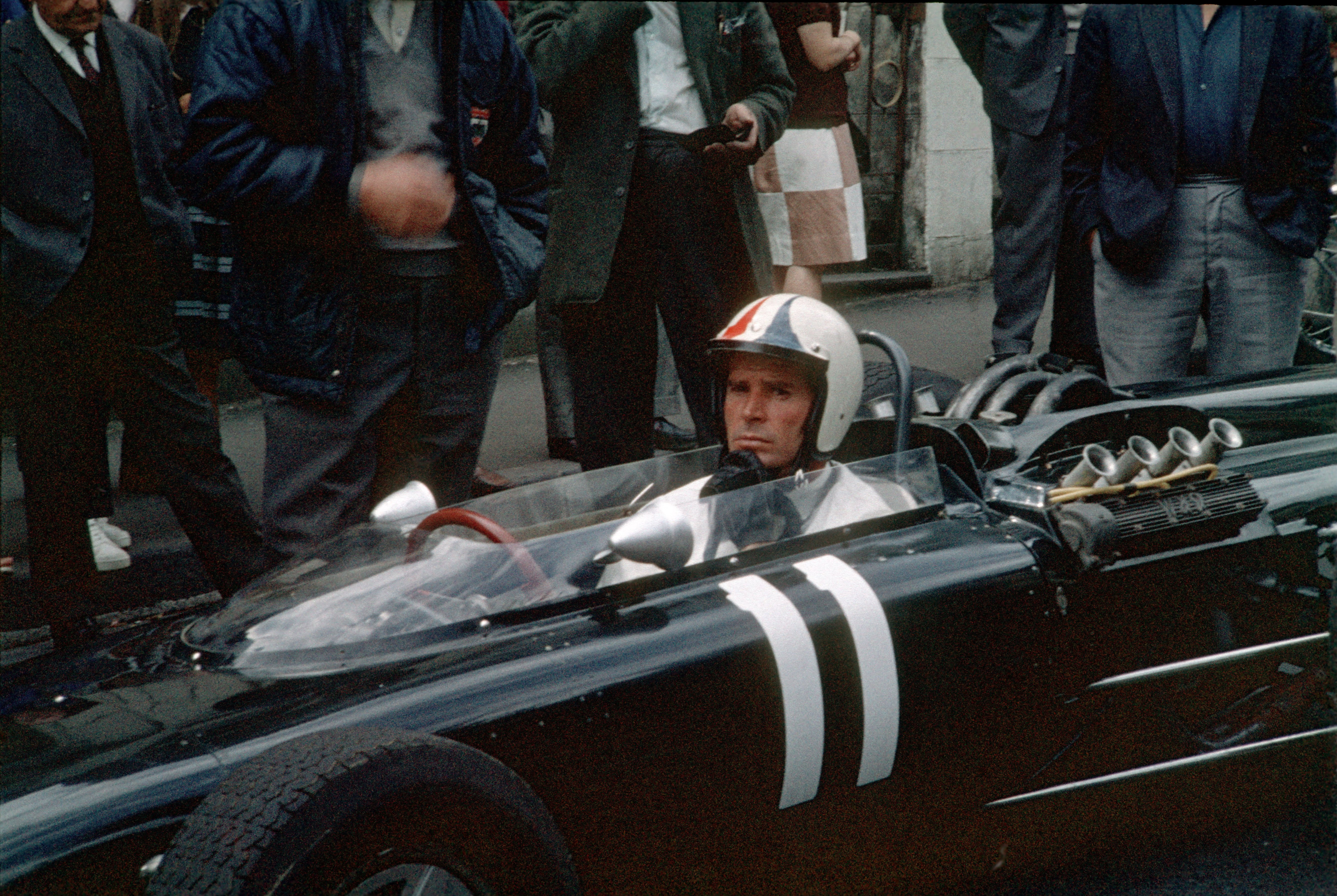
James Garner got considerable experience behind the wheel of a rear-engined Formula car, leading to his real life sponsorship of a Formula racing team

The film's plot involve three women who have close relationships with the four drivers. The married Sarti begins an affair with American magazine writer Louise Frederickson, who initially has little interest in motorsports. Aron has a brief romantic affair with Stoddard's unhappy wife Pat while Stoddard deals with living in the shadow of his family's history, being unsure if he can live up to the prestigious racing legacy of his late brother.

The story concludes at the Italian Grand Prix, its winner likely to become World Champion. Sarti's wife Monique shows up just before it begins; she comes face-to-face with Louise and tells Sarti that she'll never grant him a divorce, even as Sarti wishes to end their unhappy union. Sarti's car has technical difficulties at the race's start, with the other drivers facing a close contest for first. Sarti is killed in a spectacular crash. In recognition, his Ferrari teammate, Barlini, is flagged off the course by team leader Manetta, resulting in a tight race between Aron and Stoddard to the finish line, Aron getting the checkered flag. While a jubilant Aron magnanimously invites Stoddard to the winner's platform to join him, the shock of Sarti's death takes its toll on the celebration. The film ends with Aron alone, walking along the circuit of the final racetrack.

== Cast ==
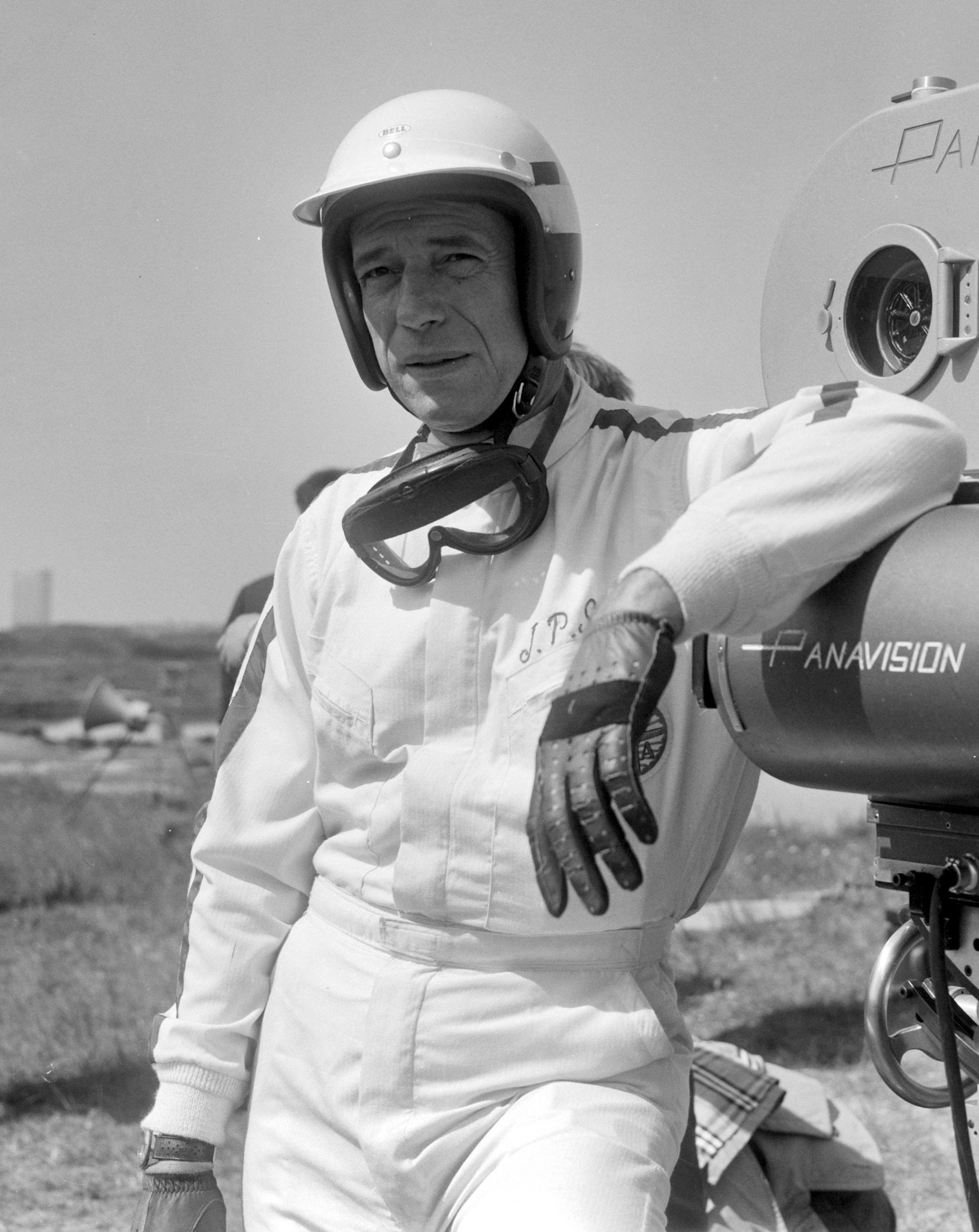
Yves Montand as Jean-Pierre Sarti

- James Garner as Pete Aron
- Yves Montand as Jean-Pierre Sarti
- Brian Bedford as Scott Stoddard
- Antonio Sabàto as Nino Barlini
- Toshiro Mifune as Izo Yamura
  - Paul Frees as Yamura's voice
- Adolfo Celi as Agostino Manetta
- Claude Dauphin as Hugo Simon
- Jack Watson as Jeff Jordan
- Donald O'Brien as Wallace Bennett
- Albert Rémy as a field doctor
- Eva Marie Saint as Louise Frederickson
- Jessica Walter as Pat Stoddard
- Françoise Hardy as Lisa
- Enzo Fiermonte as Guido
- Geneviève Page as Monique Delvaux-Sarti
- Rachel Kempson as Mrs. Stoddard
- Ralph Michael as Mr. Stoddard

== Production ==
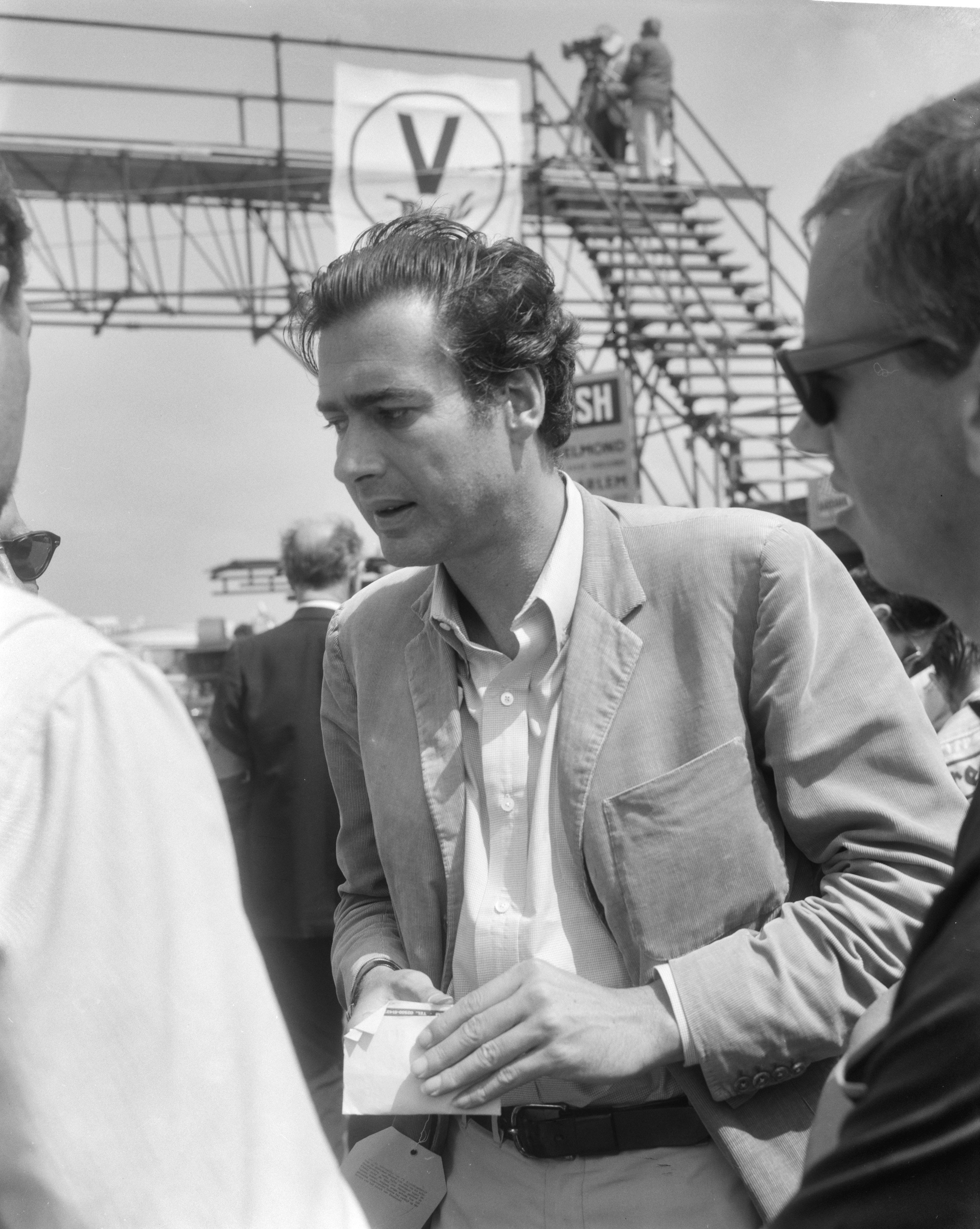
John Frankenheimer on set

Director John Frankenheimer later said when he made the film he had the "choice of making a Grand Hotel type picture or a Test Pilot type picture" and he chose the former. Swedish actress Harriet Andersson was originally cast as the female lead, but was replaced by Eva Marie Saint after the first week of filming.

The making was a race itself as fellow Hollywood icons Steve McQueen and John Sturges planned to make a similar movie exploring the life of racers, with the McQueen/Sturges team initially using the title Day of the Champion. Due to the McQueen/Sturges production's exclusivity contract with the German Nürburgring race track, Frankenheimer had to turn over 27 reels shot there to Sturges. Frankenheimer got ahead in schedule terms anyway, however, and McQueen's project ran into a wide variety of financial and other problems, causing a five-year delay until the 1971 release of the retitled film, Le Mans.

The production team began by using connections to Grand Prix drivers such as Dan Gurney, Carroll Shelby and former Grand Prix World Champion Phil Hill, who all assisted them in trying to break through an otherwise reluctant European establishment. The filming process meant disrupting vital practice runs and otherwise getting in the way of the actual racers' activities. The Grand Prix team initially faced a particularly lukewarm response from Ferrari, with the firm concerned that the movie would overly sensationalize their work. Frankenheimer spliced together approximately thirty minutes of detailed footage after filming in Monte Carlo, temporarily halted the movie's production, and sent the short piece over to the company's management. He received such a positive response that he gained unprecedented access, being allowed to shoot inside Ferrari's production floor alongside the real racing vehicles. The director used this budding relationship to push other entities to help with the film-making process. Many real-life drivers of the era ended up making cameo appearances in Grand Prix, several even briefly speaking alongside the actors.

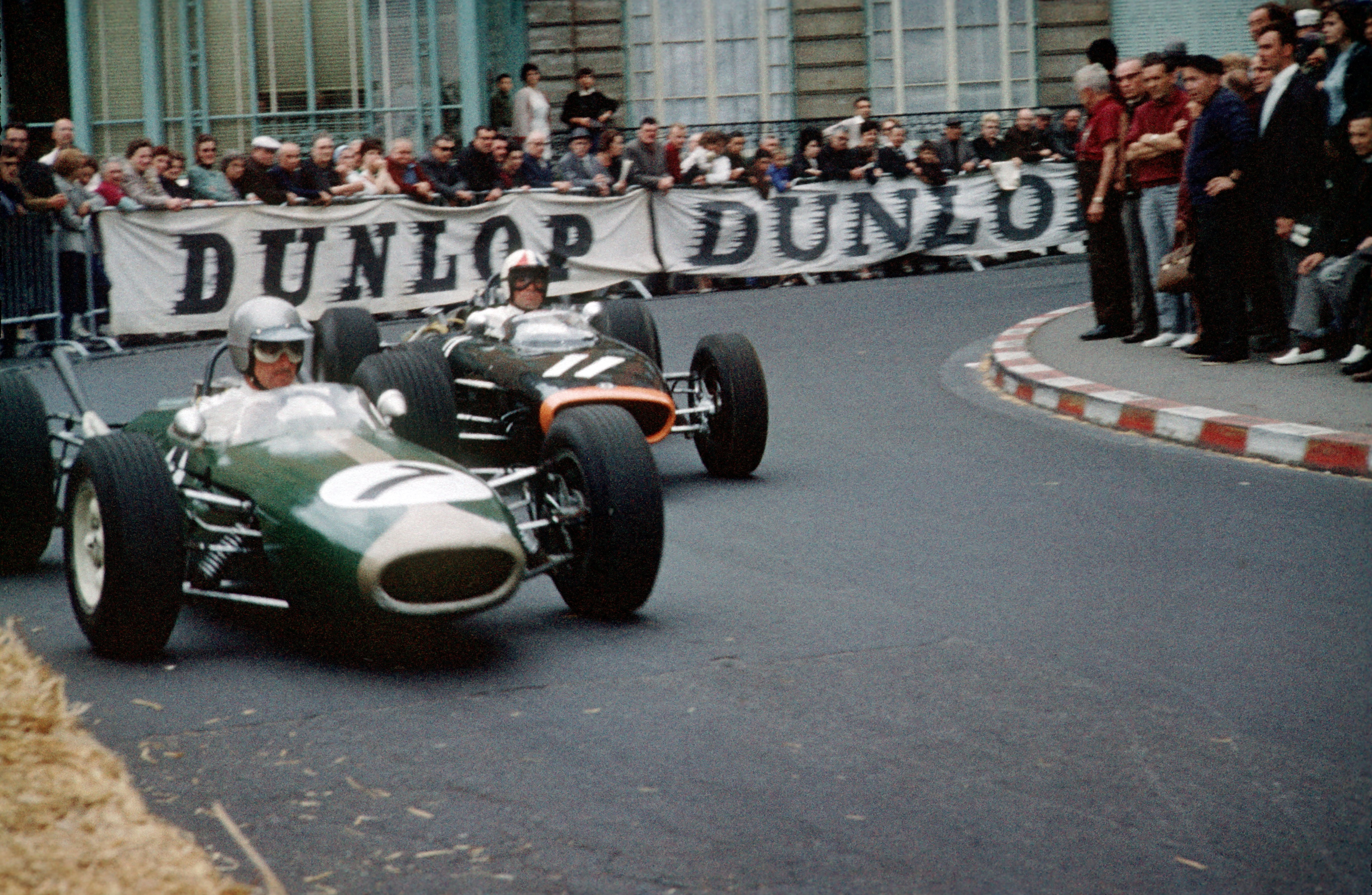
Filming on the streets of Royat, which stood in for Monaco in some scenes; James Garner is driving the following car

The F1 cars in the film are mostly mocked-up Formula Three cars made to look like contemporary Formula One models, although the film also used footage from actual F1 races. Because Yamura Motors is a fictional race team, the producers struck a deal with Bruce McLaren's newly formed McLaren team to have his car, the McLaren M2B, painted with Yamura's colors. The paint scheme used was designed to resemble that used on the contemporary Honda RA272 cars competing during this period. On two occasions, because the McLaren could not take part in these races, another car was painted in the same colours: Bob Bondurant's BRM at Spa, and at Zandvoort for the Dutch GP, the Lotus 25 BRM entered by Reg Parnell for Mike Spence.

Some of the footage was captured by Phil Hill, the 1961 World Champion, who drove a modified camera car in some sessions during the actual 1966 Monaco and Belgian Grands Prix. Notably, several aftermaths of incidents from the Belgian Grand Prix were shown during its sequence, but the aftermath of Jackie Stewart from his crash at the Masta Kink was not shown. In order to realistically film the racing cars at speed, the camera car used for much of this filming was a Ford GT40, a fast and powerful endurance racing car of the same type that dominated races such as the 24 Hours of Le Mans during the last half of the 1960s. This was some of the earliest experimentation with in-car cameras for F1, particularly in terms of first-person shots aimed at putting the audience in the position of the racers.

The actual level of driving ability possessed by the movie's actors varied wildly. Bedford could not drive at all and was only ever in the car for close-up type shots, with the production's driving instructor calling the actor's situation "hopeless". Montand and Sabàto faced significant challenges, both of them struggling with even basic skills. Garner, on the other hand, proved competent enough that he trained exclusively with iconic Shelby Cobra driver Bob Bondurant, with the actor's interest in cars growing greatly as a direct result of his involvement in the film. Garner's talents on the road became strong enough that some of the professional drivers, including Bondurant, remarked that the actor could have been a successful Grand Prix driver if he had not gone into making films; in fact, Garner went on to sponsor his own Formula racing team, captured in the 1969 documentary The Racing Scene. His devotion to the part in Grand Prix caused him to do his own stunt in the scene in which a fuel leak in his vehicle sets it on fire. Garner's car was fitted with a higher rollbar and had no seat, since he was too tall to fit in a contemporary F3 car.

The blue and red helmet design that James Garner's character uses is often confused with that of then-Grand Prix race driver Chris Amon from New Zealand; the colours are reversed. Brian Bedford's character’s design was the same as real life 1966 BRM driver Jackie Stewart. As Bedford couldn't drive, this was done so that they could shoot footage of Stewart driving the BRM (with a balaclava over his face to hide that it wasn't Bedford). Sarti's helmet was John Surtees', and Barlini's was Lorenzo Bandini's.

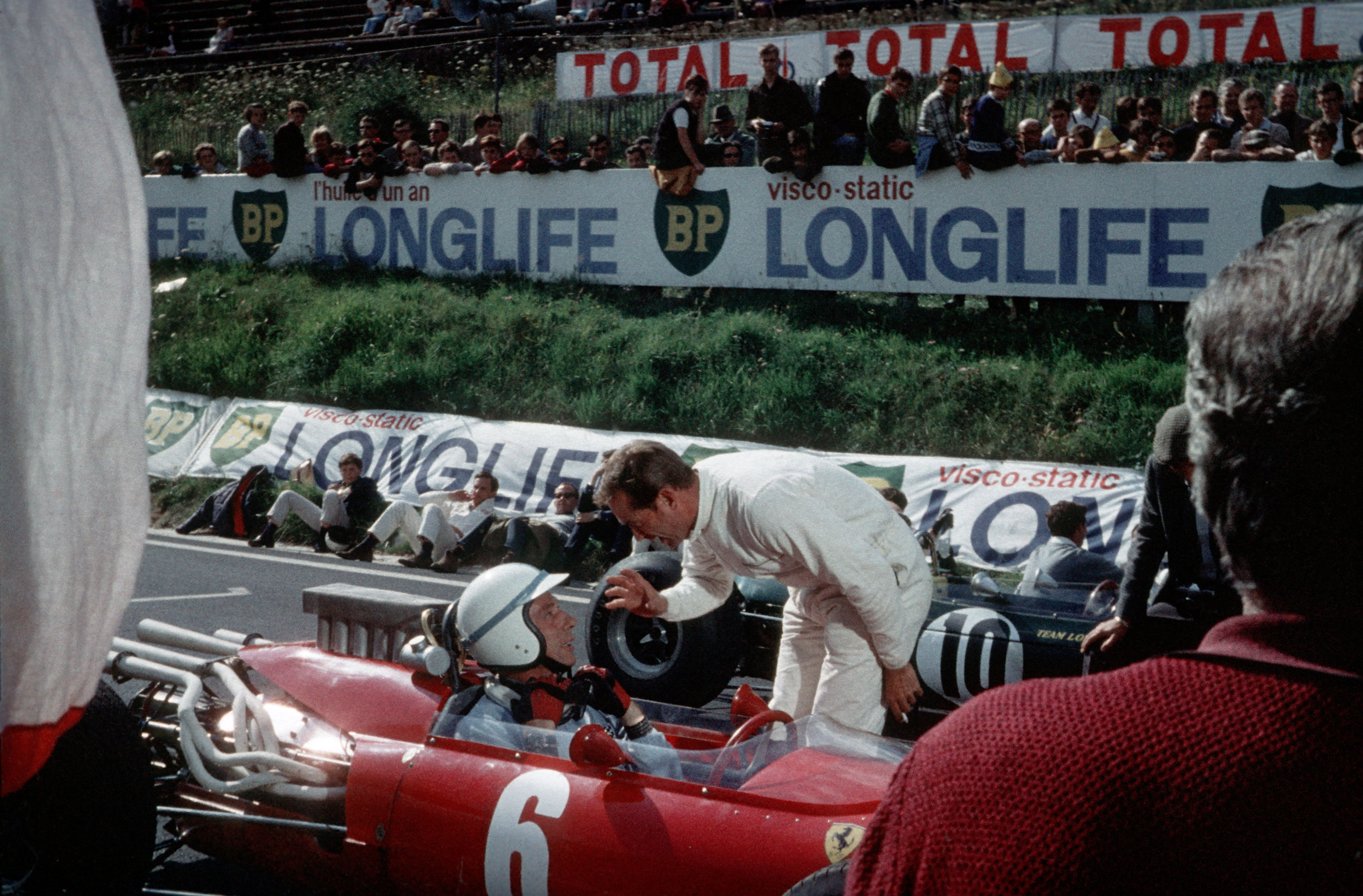
Yves Montand (sitting in the Ferrari) on set

Circuits featured in the film include Circuit de Monaco (Monaco), Clermont-Ferrand (France), Circuit de Spa-Francorchamps (Belgium), Circuit Park Zandvoort (Netherlands), Brands Hatch (United Kingdom), and Autodromo Nazionale Monza (Italy). The Nürburgring (West Germany), Watkins Glen International (USA), and the Autódromo Hermanos Rodríguez (Mexico) were all mentioned in the film but there was no footage shown.

The camera cars used during actual GP races were a Lotus 25 Climax at Monaco and a McLaren M2B Ford at Spa, both driven by 1961 F1 World Champion Phil Hill. A camera was mounted at the front only at Monaco, and an additional one filming the driving wheel was in place at Spa. Aerial shots were filmed from an Alouette III helicopter. These shots were taken so close to the actual roads that the cameraman's shoes became stained with bits of greenery from the tips of nearby trees. Several other camera cars were used during the shooting of staged races, including a modified Ford GT40 and an AC Cobra.

Although making various technological innovations in their filmmaking, numerous difficulties bogged down the movie's production. During filming with wet roads, several cars lost control to the point that one driver broke his shoulder bone and another nearly careened into the upstairs window of a house. The production team often decided to include unplanned accidents caught on film in the final movie, coming back hours later to shoot before-and-after scenes so that things fit in the final cut. For major accidents that were part of the story-line, the crew constructed a special cannon-like device that could fire gutted cars a considerable distance.

Title designer Saul Bass was credited as visual consultant, montages and titles. He made extensive use of multiple split screens. During the making of the film, both Frankenheimer and Garner were interviewed by television personality Alan Whicker for the BBC series Whicker's World.

== Reception ==
=== Box office ===
The film grossed $20.8 million in the United States and Canada. It was one of the ten highest-grossing films of 1966. Theatrical rentals generated $9.3 million for the studio.

=== Critical ===
Upon its 1966 release, New York Times critic Bosley Crowther called the film "a smashing and thundering compilation of racing footage shot superbly at the scenes of the big meets around the circuit, jazzed up with some great photographic trickery ... Mr. Frankenheimer belts you with such a barrage of magnificent shots of the racing cars, seen from every angle and every possible point of intimacy, that you really feel as though you've been in it. The octane pace race editing, interspersed with proper high speed car-to-car camera angles; long drivers' Point-of-View (POV) angles (try to stop your head moving in sync with the turns...); and a revolutionary split-screen device motif, further introducing car racing footage not seen before in modern film. Furthermore, the director and Saul Bass fill that mammoth screen from time to time with these split-screens and montages that made the racing sequences fairly jump with pure octane. Triple and quadruple panels and even screen-filling checkerboards ... hit the viewer with stimulations that optically generate a sort of intoxication with racing. It's razzle-dazzle of a random sort, but it works." However, Crowther concluded "the big trouble with this picture ... is that the characters and their romantic problems are stereotypes and clichés... You come away with the feeling that you've seen virtually everything there is to see in grand-prix racing, except the real guys who drive those killer cars."

Variety called the film "one of those rare pictures that draws its basic strength, excitement and interest-arresting potential through the visual (the pure art of cinema) and if it lacked brilliant virtuosity in the action department it would be just another flimflam." Philip K. Scheuer of the Los Angeles Times called it "the new, definitive, great film about auto racing", adding that after three hours "if one emerged with the feeling that maybe there has been just too much, here is one case in which I can state happily that it is better than too little." Leo Sullivan of The Washington Post wrote, "John Frankenheimer's 'Grand Prix' is brought alive with cinematic innovations and is frequently set ablaze with excitement." Brendan Gill of The New Yorker described the film as "big, brave, eye-bedazzling, earsplitting, and sometimes almost heart-stopping." The Monthly Film Bulletin wrote, "The cars, of course, steal all the thunder, but one is a little disappointed to find the drivers and their private lives so little elevated beyond the level of pulp fiction. Still, as a spectacle Grand Prix is on the whole such a success that the fact it isn't anything more than a spectacle hardly matters."

Forty-five years later, upon its release on Blu-ray Disc, The New York Times reviewed the film again, with Dave Kehr saying in 2011 "considered purely from a technical point of view, the new disc is a beauty, with crisp, richly textured images that do justice to the original 65-millimeter Super Panavision format, and a roaringly dimensional soundtrack ... As a movie, though, Grand Prix was never that grand. First shown as a reserved-seat, road-show attraction in Cinerama theaters, it is little more than a 176-minute version of the roller-coaster ride This Is Cinerama that introduced the format in 1952, a high-speed tour of the principal stops on the Formula One tour, with the spectator, as often as possible, strapped into the driver's seat."

On the review aggregator website Rotten Tomatoes, 92% of 13 critics' reviews are positive, with an average rating of 7.8/10. Metacritic, which uses a weighted average, assigned the film a score of 72 out of 100, based on 8 critics, indicating "generally favorable" reviews.

In 2025, The Hollywood Reporter listed Grand Prix as having the best stunts of 1967.

== Accolades ==
At the 39th Academy Awards, Grand Prix won Oscars for Best Sound Effects (Gordon Daniel), Best Film Editing (Henry Berman et al.) and Best Sound (Franklin Milton). John Frankenheimer was nominated for Outstanding Directing by the Directors Guild of America.

== See also ==
- Le Mans (film)
- The Racing Scene
- Rush (2013 film)
- Ford v Ferrari
- F1 (film)
