= Dean Martin Sings =

Studio album by Dean Martin
- Released: January 12, 1953
- Recorded: November 20, 1952
- Studios: Capitol Recording Studio, 5515 Melrose Avenue, Hollywood, California
- Genre: Vocal jazz
- Length: 21:42
- Label: Capitol
- Producer: Lee Gillette

Dean Martin chronology
Dean Martin Sings (1953)	Swingin' Down Yonder (1955)

Dean Martin Sings is the debut studio album by Italian-American singer Dean Martin, released in 1953. It is the first long-play 10-inch album recorded by Martin for Capitol Records during two sessions recorded on the evening of November 20, 1952. The first session was recorded between 5 and 8 PM and it produced five songs featuring string arrangements. "There's My Lover" was recorded but not released. After a 90-minute break, Martin was joined by a brass arrangement to record the remaining four songs. Seven of the eight songs on this album appeared in the Martin & Lewis film, The Stooge. Two years later, the songs from this 10-inch album would be combined with four newly popular songs recorded between 1951 and 1953 to create a full-length 12-inch album. The 2005 Collectors' Choice reissue added four bonus songs recorded between 1949 and 1953 and was released with alternative cover artwork.

Professional ratings
Review scores
Source	Rating
Allmusic	3/5 stars

== Track listing ==
=== 10-inch Long Play ===
Capitol H-401

==== Side A ====
Track	Song title	Originally By	Recorded	Other Info	Time
1.	"Who's Your Little Who-Zis!"	Al Goering, Ben Bernie and Walter Hirsch	November 20, 1952	Session 2828; Master 10842-2	2:19
2.	"I'm Yours"	Johnny Green and E.Y. Harburg	November 20, 1952	Session 2827; Master 10836	3:15
3.	"I Feel a Song Comin' On"	Jimmy McHugh, Dorothy Fields and George Oppenheimer	November 20, 1952	Session 2828; Master 10844-11	1:49
4.	"With My Eyes Wide Open I'm Dreaming"	Mack Gordon and Harry Revel	November 20, 1952	Session 2827; Master 10838	3:07

==== Side B ====
Track	Song title	Composer	Recorded	Other Info	Time
1.	"Just One More Chance"	Arthur Johnston / Sam Coslow	November 20, 1952	Session 2827; Master 10836	3:17
2.	"Louise"	Richard A. Whiting / Leo Robin	November 20, 1952	Session 2828; Master 10841	2:19
3.	"I Feel Like a Feather in the Breeze"	Mack Gordon / Harry Revel	November 20, 1952	Session 2828; Master 10843-7	2:45
4.	"A Girl Named Mary and a Boy Named Bill"	Jerry Livingston / Mack David	November 20, 1952	Session 2827; Master 10840	2:51

=== 12-inch Long Play ===
Capitol T 401

==== Side A ====
Track	Song title	Composer	Recorded	Other Info	Time
1.	"Who's Your Little Who-Zis!"	Al Goering / Ben Bernie / Walter Hirsch arranged by Nelson Riddle	November 20, 1952	Session 2828; Master 10842-2	2:19
2.	"I'm Yours"	Johnny Green / E.Y. Harburg arranged by Gus Levene	November 20, 1952	Session 2827; Master 10836	3:15
3.	"I Feel a Song Comin' On"	Jimmy McHugh / Dorothy Fields / George Oppenheimer arranged by Nelson Riddle	November 20, 1952	Session 2828; Master 10844-11	1:49
4.	"Come Back to Sorrento (Torna a Surriento)"	Ernesto deCurtis / Alice Mattulath / arranged by Gus Levene	November 19, 1951	Session 2839; Master 9320-6	3:14
5.	"Oh Marie"	Eduardo di Capua / arranged by Nelson Riddle	April 8, 1952	Session 2567; Master 9871-8	2:23
6.	"With My Eyes Wide Open I'm Dreaming"	Mack Gordon / Harry Revel arranged by Gus Levene	November 20, 1952	Session 2827; Master 10838	3:07

==== Side B ====
Track	Song title	Composer	Recorded	Other Info	Time
1.	"Just One More Chance"	Arthur Johnston / Sam Coslow arranged by Nelson Riddle	November 20, 1952	Session 2827; Master 10836	3:17
2.	"Louise"	Richard A. Whiting / Leo Robin	November 20, 1952	Session 2828; Master 10841	2:19
3.	"That's Amore"	Harry Warren / Jack Brooks arranged by Gus Levene	August 13, 1953	Session 3098; Master 11694-6	3:08
4.	"I Feel Like a Feather in the Breeze"	Mack Gordon / Harry Revel	November 20, 1952	Session 2828; Master 10843-7	2:45
5.	"When You're Smiling"	Larry Shay / Mark Fischer / Joe Goodwin arranged by Nelson Riddle	January 21, 1952	Session 2499; Master 9625-5	3:02
6.	"A Girl Named Mary and a Boy Named Bill"	Jerry Livingston / Mack David arranged by Nelson Riddle	November 20, 1952	Session 2827; Master 10840	2:51

=== Compact Disc ===
2005 Collectors' Choice Music CD Catalog Number WWCCM05982 The 12-tracks of 2nd LP Plus:

1. "You're the Right One" (Sammy Gallop / Howard Steiner) Time: 3:09. Session 3098; Master 11695–5. Recorded August 13, 1953.
2. "Blue Smoke (Kohu Auwahi)" (Ruru Karaitiana) Time: 2:26. Session 2382; Master 9292–9. Recorded November 5, 1951.
3. "Johnny, Get Your Girl" (Vic Mizzy / Mann Curtis) Time: 2:33. Session 1172A; Master 3907–2. Recorded January 26, 1949.
4. "As You Are" (Billy Friedman / Herbert L. Miller) Time: 3:05. Session 2382; Master 9282–7. Recorded November 5, 1951.

== Personnel ==
- Dean Martin: Vocals
- Dick Stabile: Leader
- Vincent Terri: Guitar
- Norman V. Seelig: Bass
- Ray S. Toland: Drums, Contractor
- Louis Brown: Piano
- Armond Kaproff: Cello (Session 2827)
- Elias Friede: Cello (Session 2827)
- Helen Bliss: Harp (Session 2827)
- Louis Kievman: Viola (Session 2827)
- Reuben Marcus: Viola (Session 2827)
- John Augustine: Violin (Session 2827)
- Victor Bay: Violin (Session 2827)
- John Peter DeVoogt: Violin (Session 2827)
- Nicholas 'Nick' Pisani: Violin (Session 2827)
- Joseph G. Quadri: Violin (Session 2827)
- Mischa Russell: Violin (Session 2827)
- Jules Jacob: Saxophone (Session 2828)
- Robert Lawson: Saxophone (Session 2828)
- Theodore M 'Ted' Nash: Saxophone (Session 2828)
- Edward 'Ed' Rosa: Saxophone (Session 2828)
- Ray Heath: Trombone (Session 2828)
- Eddie Kuczborski 'Eddie' Kusby: Trombone (Session 2828)
- Paul O.W. Tanner: Trombone (Session 2828)
- Conrad Gozzo: Trumpet (Session 2828)
- Joe Dolney: Trumpet (Session 2828)
- James Rosselli: Trumpet (Session 2828)
