= Paramount Pictures =

American film and distribution company

Paramount Pictures Corporation
- Logo used since 1967 (Note: Current version with 'A Skydance Company' byline used since 2026.)

- The Paramount Pictures studio lot in Hollywood, Los Angeles
- Formerly: Famous Players Film Company (1912–1916); Famous Players–Lasky Corporation (1916–1927); Paramount Famous Lasky Corporation (1927–1930); Paramount Publix Corporation (1930–1933); Paramount Productions Inc. (1933–1936); Paramount Pictures Inc. (1936–1950)
- Type: Subsidiary
- Industry: Film
- Founded: May 8, 1912; 114 years ago
- Founders: William Wadsworth Hodkinson; Adolph Zukor; Jesse L. Lasky
- Headquarters: 5555 Melrose Avenue, Hollywood, California, U.S.
- Area served: Worldwide
- Key people: Dana Goldberg (Co-Chair, Skydance Motion Picture Group); Josh Greenstein (Co-Chair, Skydance Motion Picture Group and Vice Chair of Platforms); Kira Goldberg and Don Granger (Co-Presidents)
- Products: Motion pictures
- Owner: Skydance
- Parent: Skydance Motion Picture Group
- Divisions: Nickelodeon Movies; Paramount Animation; Paramount Players; Paramount Primal; Skydance Animation
- Subsidiaries: Republic Pictures; Miramax (49%)
- Website: www.paramount.com

Paramount Pictures Corporation, commonly known as Paramount Pictures or simply Paramount, is an American film studio and distribution arm of Skydance Motion Pictures, itself a division of Skydance. Founded on May 8, 1912, it is the sixth-oldest global film studio and the second-oldest in the United States behind Universal Pictures, and along with its sister studio Warner Bros. Pictures, it is one of the "Big Four" film studios.

In 1916, film producer Adolph Zukor put 24 actors and actresses under contract and honored each with a star on the logo. In 1967, the number of stars was reduced to 22 and their hidden meaning was dropped. In 2014, Paramount Pictures became the first major Hollywood studio to distribute all of its films in digital form only.

The most commercially successful film franchises from Paramount Pictures include Star Trek, Indiana Jones, Top Gun, Mission: Impossible, and Transformers. Additionally, the studio's library includes many notable films such as The Greatest Show on Earth, Rear Window, The Ten Commandments, Love Story, The Godfather, Grease, Ghost, Forrest Gump, Titanic and Saving Private Ryan, with four of the ten films winning the Academy Award for Best Picture, and all of them were among the highest-grossing films of all time, with Titanic breaking the record during its initial release.

== History ==
=== Famous Players Film Company ===
Paramount is the sixth-oldest surviving film studio globally, after Gaumont (1895), Pathé (1896), Titanus (1904), Nordisk Film (1906) and Universal Pictures (1912). It is the last major film studio still headquartered in the Hollywood district of Los Angeles.

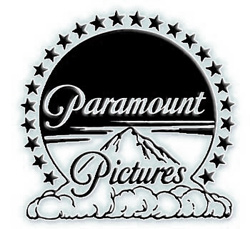
Paramount Pictures' first logo, with 24 stars, based on a design by its co-founder William Wadsworth Hodkinson, used from 1914 to 1969

Paramount Pictures dates its existence from the 1912 founding date of the Famous Players Film Company. Hungarian-born founder Adolph Zukor, who had been an early investor in nickelodeons, saw that movies appealed mainly to working-class immigrants. With partners Daniel Frohman and Charles Frohman he planned to offer feature-length films that would appeal to the middle class by featuring the leading theatrical players of the time, leading to the slogan "Famous Players in Famous Plays". By mid-1913, Famous Players had completed five films, and Zukor was on his way to success. Its first film was Les Amours de la reine Élisabeth, which starred Sarah Bernhardt.

That same year, another aspiring producer, Jesse L. Lasky, opened Jesse L. Lasky Feature Play Company with money borrowed from his brother-in-law, Samuel Goldfish, later known as Samuel Goldwyn. The Jesse L. Lasky Feature Play Company hired as their first employee a stage director with virtually no film experience, Cecil B. DeMille, who found a suitable site in Hollywood. This place was a rented old horse barn converted into a production facility with an enlarged open-air stage located between Vine Street, Selma Avenue, Argyle Avenue and Sunset Boulevard. It was later known as the Lasky-DeMille Barn. In 1914, their first feature film, The Squaw Man was released.

On May 8, 1914, Paramount Pictures Corporation, previously known as Progressive Pictures, was founded by a Utah theatre owner, W. W. Hodkinson, who had bought and merged five smaller firms. On May 15, 1914, Hodkinson signed a five-year contract with the Famous Players Film Company, the Lasky Company and Bosworth, Inc. to distribute their films. Actor, director and producer Hobart Bosworth had started production of a series of Jack London movies. Paramount was the first successful nationwide distributor. Until this time, films were sold on a statewide or regional basis, which had proved costly to film producers. Also, Famous Players and Lasky were privately owned while Paramount was a corporation.

=== Famous Players–Lasky ===
In 1916, Zukor engineered a three-way merger of his Famous Players, the Lasky Company, and Paramount. Zukor and Lasky bought Hodkinson out of Paramount, and merged the three companies into one. The new company Lasky and Zukor founded on June 28, Famous Players–Lasky Corporation, although it continued to use the name "Paramount", as well. As a result, it became the largest film company at the time with a value of US$12.5 million (equivalent to $255.1 million in 2025). The corporation was able to grow quickly, with Lasky and his partners Goldwyn and DeMille running the production side, Hiram Abrams in charge of distribution, and Zukor making great plans. With only the exhibitor-owned First National as a rival, Famous Players–Lasky and its "Paramount Pictures" soon dominated the business. The fusion was finalized on November 7, 1916.

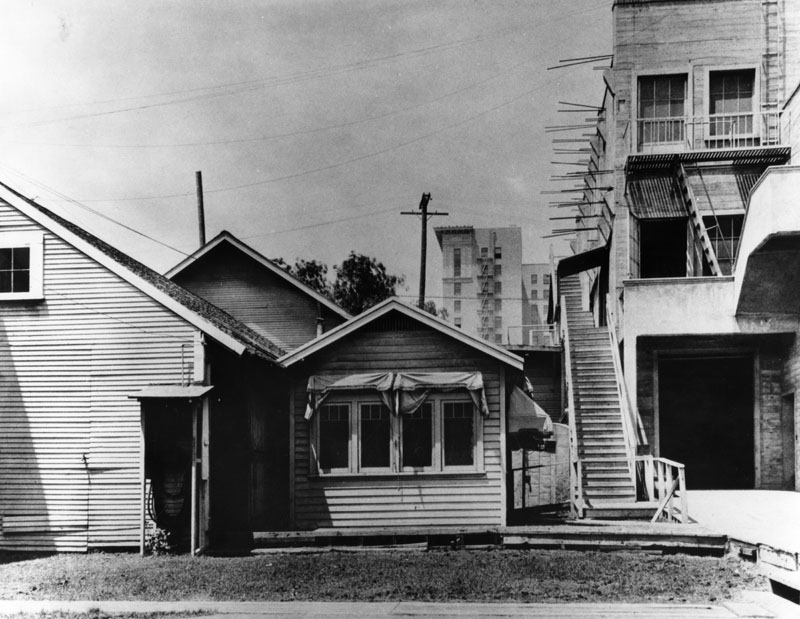
Lasky's original studio, a.k.a. "The Barn", in the mid-1920s. The Taft building, built in 1923, is visible in the background.

Because Zukor believed in stars, he signed and developed many of the leading early stars, including Mary Pickford, Marguerite Clark, Pauline Frederick, Douglas Fairbanks, Gloria Swanson, Rudolph Valentino, and Wallace Reid. With so many important players, Paramount was able to introduce "block booking", which meant that an exhibitor who wanted a particular star's films had to buy a year's worth of other Paramount productions. It was this system that gave Paramount a leading position in the 1920s and 1930s, but which led the government to pursue it on antitrust grounds for more than twenty years.

By the mid-1920s, the old Lasky-DeMille barn property was not big enough to handle all of the studios' West Coast productions. On January 5, 1926, Lasky reached an agreement to buy the Robert Brunton Studios, a 26-acre facility owned by United Pictures and located at 5451 Marathon Street, for $1.0 million (equivalent to $14.5 million in 2025). On March 29, the company began an eight-month building program to renovate the existing facilities and erect new ones. On May 8, 1926 Lasky moved operations from the Sunset and Vine lot to the new building. At present, those facilities are still part of the Paramount Pictures headquarters. Zukor hired independent producer B. P. Schulberg, an unerring eye for new talent, to run the new West Coast operations.

The logo, with Portuguese captions: Distribuida Pela Paramount.

On April 1, 1927, the company name was changed to Paramount Famous Lasky Corporation. In September 1927, the Paramount Famous Lasky Corporation studio in Astoria (New York City) was temporarily closed with the objective of equipping it with the technology for the production of sound films. In the same year, Paramount began releasing Inkwell Imps, animated cartoons produced by Max and Dave Fleischer's Fleischer Studios in New York City. The Fleischers, veterans in the animation industry, were among the few animation producers capable of challenging the prominence of Walt Disney.

The Paramount newsreel series Paramount News ran from 1927 to 1957. Paramount was also one of the first Hollywood studios to release what were known at that time as "talkies", and in 1929, released their first musical, Innocents of Paris. Richard A. Whiting and Leo Robin composed the score for the film; Maurice Chevalier starred and sang the most famous song from the film, "Louise".

==== Publix, Balaban and Katz, Loew's competition and wonder theaters ====
The driving force behind Paramount's rise was Zukor. He built a chain of nearly 2,000 screens, ran two production studios (in Astoria, New York, now the Kaufman Astoria Studios, and Hollywood, California), and became an early investor in radio, acquiring for the corporation a 50% interest in the new Columbia Broadcasting System in 1928, selling it within a few years. This would not be the last time Paramount and CBS crossed paths.

By acquiring the successful Balaban & Katz chain in 1926, Zukor gained the services of Barney Balaban (who would eventually become Paramount's president in 1936), his brother A. J. Balaban (who would eventually supervise all stage production nationwide and produce talkie shorts), and their partner Sam Katz, who would run the Paramount-Publix theatre chain in New York City from the thirty-five-story Paramount Theatre Building on Times Square.

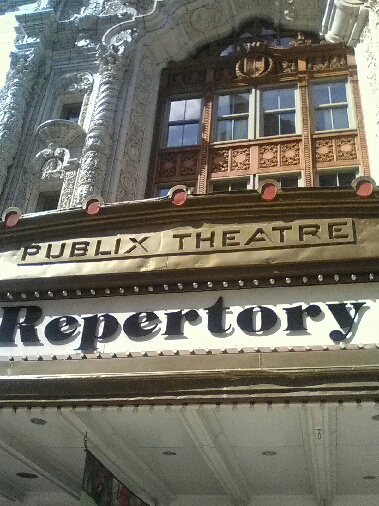
Detail of Publix Theatre logo on what is now Indiana Repertory Theatre

Balaban and Katz had developed the Wonder Theater concept, first publicized around 1918 in Chicago. The Chicago Theater was created as a very ornate theater and advertised as a "wonder theater". When Publix acquired Balaban, they embarked on a project to expand the wonder theaters, and started building in New York City in 1927. While Balaban and Public were dominant in Chicago, Loew's was the big player in New York City, and did not want the Publix theaters to overshadow theirs. The two companies brokered a non-competition deal for New York City and Chicago, and Loew's took over the New York City area projects, developing five wonder theaters. Publix continued Balaban's wonder theater development in its home area.

On April 24, 1930, Paramount-Famous Lasky Corporation became the Paramount Publix Corporation.

=== 1920s and 1931–1940: Receivership and reorganization ===
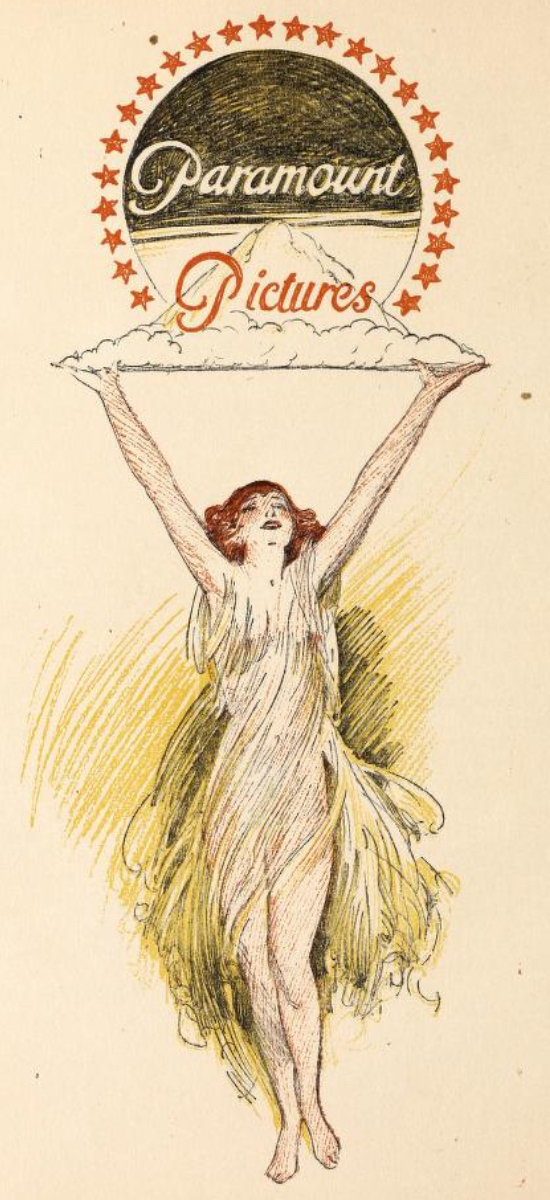
A Paramount Showman's Pictures advertisement, 1925

Eventually, Zukor shed most of his early partners; the Frohman brothers, Hodkinson and Goldwyn were out by 1917 while Lasky hung on until 1932, when, blamed for the near-collapse of Paramount in the Great Depression years, he was also tossed out. In 1931, to solve the financial problems of the company Zukor hired taxi/rental car magnate John D. Hertz as chairman of the finance committee in order to assist vice-president and treasurer Ralph A. Kohn.

On January 6, 1933, Hertz resigned from his position when his measures to lift the company had failed. The over-expansion and use of overvalued Paramount stock for purchases created a $21 million debt which led the company into receivership on January 26, 1933, and later filing bankruptcy on March 14, 1933. On April 17, 1933, bankruptcy trustees were appointed and Zukor lost control of the company.

The company remained under the control of trustees for more than a year in order to restructure the debt and pursue a reorganization plan. On December 3, 1934, the reorganization plan was formally proposed. After prolonged hearings in court, final confirmation was obtained on April 25, 1935, when Federal Judge Alfred C. Coxe Jr. approved the reorganization of the Paramount-Publix Corporation under Section 77-B of the Bankruptcy Act.

On June 4, 1935, John E. Otterson became president of the re-emerged and newly renamed Paramount Pictures Inc. Zukor returned to the company and was named production chief but after Barney Balaban was appointed president on July 2, 1936, he was soon replaced by Y. Frank Freeman and symbolically named chairman of the board. On August 28, 1935, Paramount Pictures was re-listed on the New York Stock Exchange and when the company was under Balaban's leadership, the studio was successfully relaunched.

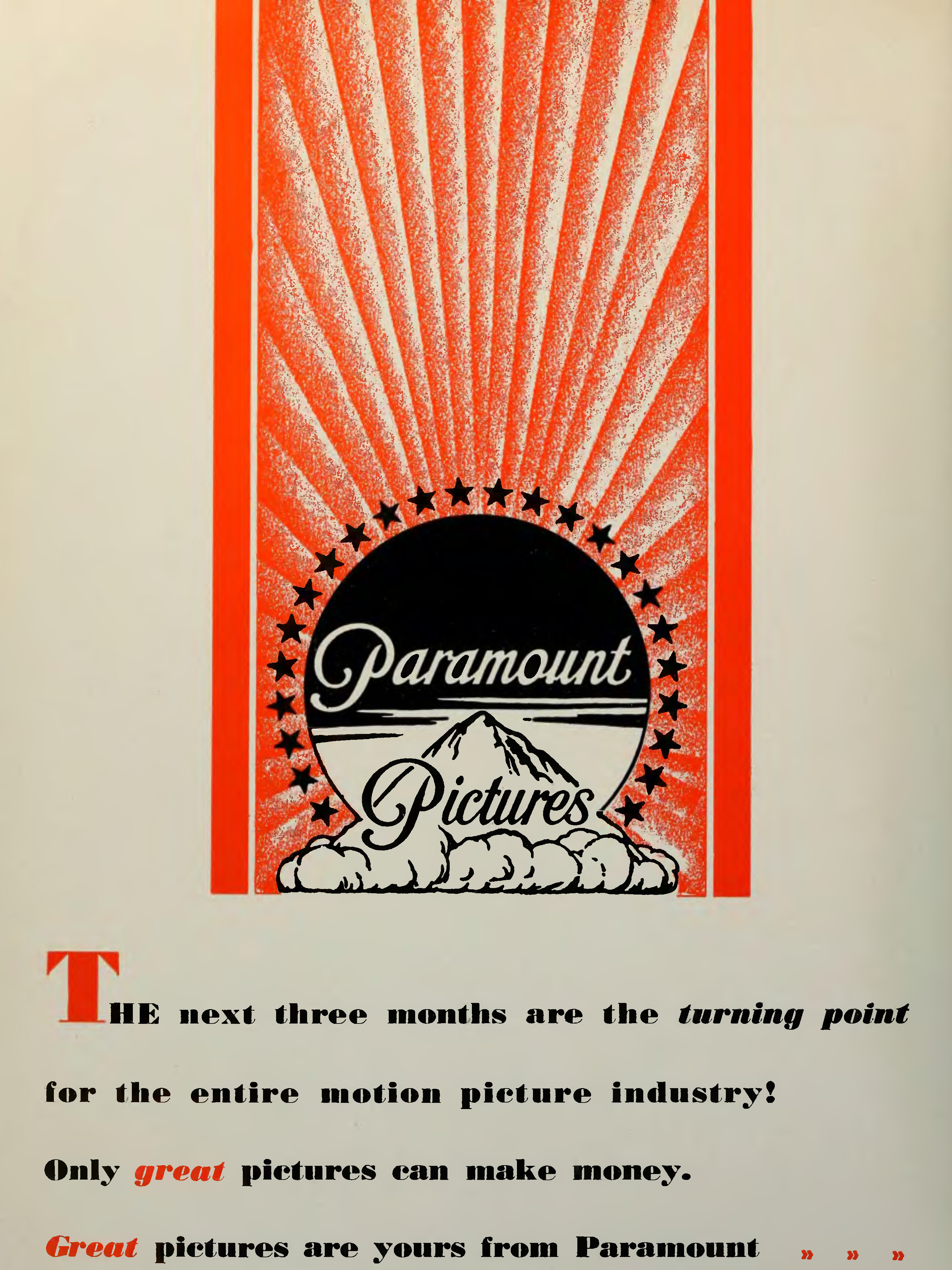
A Paramount Pictures ad in The Film Daily, 1932

As always, Paramount films continued to emphasize stars. In the 1920s there were Gloria Swanson, Wallace Reid, Rudolph Valentino, Florence Vidor, Thomas Meighan, Pola Negri, Bebe Daniels, Antonio Moreno, Richard Dix, Esther Ralston, Emil Jannings, George Bancroft, Betty Compson, Clara Bow, Adolphe Menjou, and Charles Buddy Rogers.

By the late 1920s and the early 1930s, talkies brought in a range of powerful draws: Richard Arlen, Nancy Carroll, Maurice Chevalier, Gary Cooper, Marlene Dietrich, Charles Ruggles, Ruth Chatterton, William Powell, Mae West, Sylvia Sidney, Bing Crosby, Claudette Colbert, the Marx Brothers, W.C. Fields, Fredric March, Jack Oakie, Jeanette MacDonald (whose first two films were shot at Paramount's Astoria, New York, studio), Carole Lombard, George Raft, Miriam Hopkins, Cary Grant and Stuart Erwin, among them.

In this period Paramount can truly be described as a movie factory, turning out sixty to seventy pictures a year. Such were the benefits of having a huge theater chain to fill, and of block booking to persuade other chains to go along. In 1933, Mae West would also add greatly to Paramount's success with her suggestive movies She Done Him Wrong and I'm No Angel. West's sex appeal in these movies also lead to the enforcement of the Production Code, as the newly formed organization the Catholic Legion of Decency threatened a boycott if it was not enforced. Paramount cartoons produced by Fleischer Studios continued to be successful, with characters such as Betty Boop and Popeye the Sailor becoming widely successful. One Fleischer series, Screen Songs, featured live-action music stars under contract to Paramount hosting sing-alongs of popular songs. The animation studio would rebound with Popeye, and in 1935, polls showed that Popeye was even more popular than Mickey Mouse. After an unsuccessful expansion into feature films, as well as the fact that Max and Dave Fleischer were no longer speaking to one another, Fleischer Studios was acquired by Paramount, which renamed the operation Famous Studios. That incarnation of the animation studio continued cartoon production until 1967, but has been historically dismissed as having largely failed to maintain the artistic acclaim the Fleischer brothers achieved under their management.

=== 1941–1950: United States v. Paramount Pictures, Inc. ===
In 1940, Paramount agreed to a government-instituted consent decree: block booking and "pre-selling" (the practice of collecting up-front money for films not yet in production) would end. Immediately, Paramount cut back on production, from 71 films to a more modest 19 annually in the war years. Still, with more new stars like Bob Hope, Alan Ladd, Veronica Lake, Paulette Goddard, and Betty Hutton, and with war-time attendance at astronomical numbers, Paramount and the other integrated studio-theatre combines made more money than ever. At this, the Federal Trade Commission and the Justice Department decided to reopen their case against the five integrated studios. Paramount also had a monopoly over Detroit movie theaters through subsidiary company United Detroit Theaters. This led to the Supreme Court decision United States v. Paramount Pictures, Inc. (1948) holding that movie studios could not also own movie theater chains. This decision broke up Adolph Zukor's creation, with the theater chain being split into a new company, United Paramount Theaters, and effectively brought an end to the classic Hollywood studio system.

=== 1951–1966: Split and after ===
With the separation of production and exhibition forced by the U.S. Supreme Court, Paramount Pictures Inc. was split in two. The film production and distribution portion of company was renamed back to Paramount Pictures Corporation, while the 1,500-screen theater chain became part of the newly-formed United Paramount Theaters on December 31, 1949. Leonard Goldenson, who had headed the chain since 1938, remained as the new company's president. The Balaban and Katz theatre division was spun off with UPT; its trademark eventually became the property of the Balaban and Katz Historical Foundation. The foundation later acquired ownership of the Famous Players trademark. Cash-rich and controlling prime downtown real estate, Goldenson began looking for investments. Barred from film-making by prior antitrust rulings, he acquired the struggling ABC television network in February 1953, leading it first to financial health, and eventually, in the mid-1970s, to first place in the national Nielsen ratings, before selling out to Capital Cities in 1985 (Capital Cities would eventually sell out, in turn, to The Walt Disney Company in 1996). United Paramount Theaters was renamed ABC Theaters in 1965 and was sold to businessman Henry G. Plitt in 1977. The movie theater chain was renamed Plitt Theaters. In 1985, Cineplex Odeon Corporation merged with Plitt. In later years, Paramount's television division would develop a strong relationship with ABC, providing many hit series to the network.

Paramount Pictures had been an early backer of television, launching experimental stations in 1939 in Los Angeles and Chicago. The Los Angeles station eventually became KTLA, the first commercial station on the West Coast. The Chicago station got a commercial license as WBKB in 1943, but was sold to UPT along with Balaban & Katz in 1948 and was eventually resold to CBS as WBBM-TV.

In 1938, Paramount bought a stake in television manufacturer DuMont Laboratories. Through this stake, it became a minority owner of the DuMont Television Network. Paramount also launched its own network, Paramount Television Network, in 1948 through its television unit, Television Productions, Inc.

Paramount management planned to acquire additional owned-and-operated stations ("O&Os"); the company applied to the FCC for additional stations in San Francisco, Detroit, and Boston. The FCC, however, denied Paramount's applications. A few years earlier, the federal regulator had placed a five-station cap on all television networks: no network was allowed to own more than five VHF television stations. Paramount was hampered by its minority stake in the DuMont Television Network. Although both DuMont and Paramount executives stated that the companies were separate, the FCC ruled that Paramount's partial ownership of DuMont meant that DuMont and Paramount were in theory branches of the same company. Since DuMont owned three television stations and Paramount owned two, the federal agency ruled neither network could acquire additional television stations. The FCC requested that Paramount relinquish its stake in DuMont, but Paramount refused. According to television historian William Boddy, "Paramount's checkered antitrust history" helped convince the FCC that Paramount controlled DuMont. Both DuMont and Paramount Television Network suffered as a result, with neither company able to acquire five O&Os. Meanwhile, CBS, ABC, and NBC had each acquired the maximum of five stations by the mid-1950s. When ABC accepted a merger offer from UPT in 1953, DuMont quickly realized that ABC now had more resources than it could possibly hope to match. It quickly reached an agreement in principle to merge with ABC. However, Paramount vetoed the offer due to antitrust concerns. For all intents and purposes, this was the end of DuMont, though it lingered on until 1956.

In 1951, Paramount bought a stake in International Telemeter, an experimental pay television service which operated with a coin inserted into a box. The service began operating in Palm Springs, California on November 27, 1953, but due to pressure from the FCC, the service ended on May 15, 1954.

With the loss of the theater chain, Paramount Pictures went into a decline, cutting studio-backed production, releasing its contract players, and making production deals with independents. By the mid-1950s, all the great names were gone; only Cecil B. DeMille, associated with Paramount since 1913, kept making pictures in the grand old style. Despite Paramount's losses, DeMille would, however, give the studio some relief and create his most successful film at Paramount, a 1956 remake of his 1923 film The Ten Commandments. DeMille died in 1959. Like some other studios, Paramount saw little value in its film library and sold 764 of its pre-1950 films to MCA Inc./EMKA, Ltd. (known today as Universal Television) in February 1958. The company expanded its television activities when Paramount purchased a majority stake in Talent Associates in 1961, which was divested in 1965, and the purchase of Plautus Productions in 1963.

=== 1966–1970: Early Gulf+Western era ===
By the early 1960s, Paramount's future was doubtful. The high-risk movie business was wobbly; the theater chain was long gone; investments in DuMont and in early pay-television came to nothing; and the Golden Age of Hollywood had just ended, even the flagship Paramount Building in Times Square was sold to raise cash, as was KTLA (sold to Gene Autry in 1964 for a then-phenomenal $12.5 million). Their only remaining successful property at that point was Dot Records, which Paramount had acquired in 1957, and even its profits started declining by the middle of the 1960s. Founding father Zukor (born 1873) was still chairman emeritus; he referred to chairman Balaban (born 1888) as "the boy". Such aged leadership was incapable of keeping up with the changing times, and in 1966, a sinking Paramount was sold to Charles Bluhdorn's industrial conglomerate, Gulf and Western Industries. Bluhdorn immediately put his stamp on the studio, installing a virtually unknown producer named Robert Evans as head of production. Despite some rough times, Evans held the job for eight years, restoring Paramount's reputation for commercial success with movies like The Odd Couple, Rosemary's Baby, Love Story, The Godfather, Paper Moon, Chinatown, and 3 Days of the Condor.

Gulf and Western also bought the neighboring Desilu Productions television studio (once the lot of RKO Pictures) from Lucille Ball in 1967. Using some of Desilu's established shows such as Star Trek, Mission: Impossible, and Mannix as a foot in the door at the networks, the newly reincorporated Paramount Television eventually became known as a specialist in half-hour situation comedies.

In 1968, Paramount formed Films Distributing Corp to distribute sensitive film product, including Sin With a Stranger, which was one of the first films to receive an X rating in the United States when the MPAA introduced their new rating system.

=== 1971–1980: CIC formation and high-concept era ===
In 1970, Paramount teamed with Universal Pictures to form Cinema International Corporation, a new company that would distribute films by the two studios outside the United States. Metro-Goldwyn-Mayer would become a partner in 1973. Both Paramount and CIC entered the video market with Paramount Home Video (now Paramount Home Entertainment) and CIC Video, respectively.

Robert Evans abandoned his position as head of production in 1974; his successor, Richard Sylbert, proved to be too literary and too tasteful for Gulf and Western's Bluhdorn. By 1976, a new, television-trained team was in place, headed by Barry Diller and his "Killer-Dillers", as they were called by admirers or "Dillettes" as they were called by detractors. These associates, made up of Michael Eisner, Jeffrey Katzenberg, Dawn Steel, and Don Simpson, would each go on and head up major movie studios of their own later in their careers.

The Paramount specialty was now simpler. "High concept" pictures such as Saturday Night Fever and Grease hit big, hard, and fast all over the world, while its fortuitous earlier acquisition of the Star Trek property, which had grown into a cult favorite, enabled Paramount to have a long running science fiction film and television franchise to compete with the outstanding popular success of Star Wars. Diller's television background led him to propose one of his longest-standing ideas to the board: Paramount Television Service, a fourth commercial network. Through Gulf and Western, Paramount Pictures purchased the Hughes Television Network (HTN), including its satellite time in planning for PTVS in 1976. Paramount sold HTN to Madison Square Garden Corporation in 1979. But Diller believed strongly in the concept, and so took his fourth-network idea with him when he moved to 20th Century Fox in 1984, where Fox's then freshly installed proprietor, Rupert Murdoch was a more interested listener.

However, the television division would be playing catch-up for over a decade after Diller's departure in 1984 before launching its own television network – UPN – in 1995. Lasting eleven years before being merged with The WB network to become The CW in 2006, UPN would feature many of the shows it originally produced for other networks, and would take numerous gambles on series such as Star Trek: Voyager and Star Trek: Enterprise that would have otherwise either gone direct-to-cable or become first-run syndication to independent stations across the country (as Star Trek: Deep Space Nine and Star Trek: The Next Generation were).

Paramount Pictures was not connected to either Paramount Records (active between 1917 and 1932) or ABC-Paramount Records (1955–66) until it purchased the rights to use the name (but not the latter's catalog) in the late 1960s. The Paramount name was used for soundtrack albums and some pop re-issues from the Dot Records catalog, which Paramount had acquired in 1957. By 1970, Dot had become an exclusively country music label and in 1974, Paramount sold all of its record holdings to ABC Records, which in turn was sold to MCA (now Universal Music Group) in 1979.

=== 1980–1994: Continual success ===
Paramount's successful run of pictures extended into the 1980s and 1990s, generating hits like Airplane!, American Gigolo, Ordinary People, An Officer and a Gentleman, Flashdance, Terms of Endearment, Footloose, Pretty in Pink, Top Gun, Crocodile Dundee, Fatal Attraction, Ghost, the Friday the 13th slasher series, as well as joining forces with Lucasfilm and Steven Spielberg to create the Indiana Jones franchise. Other examples are the Star Trek film series and a string of films starring comedian Eddie Murphy like Trading Places, Coming to America and Beverly Hills Cop and its sequels. While the emphasis was decidedly on the commercial, there were occasional less commercial but more artistic and intellectual efforts like I'm Dancing as Fast as I Can, Atlantic City, Reds, Witness, Children of a Lesser God and The Accused. During this period, responsibility for running the studio passed from Eisner and Katzenberg to Frank Mancuso, Sr. (1984) and Ned Tanen (1984) to Stanley R. Jaffe (1991) and Sherry Lansing (1992). More so than most, Paramount's slate of films included many remakes and television spin-offs; while sometimes commercially successful, there have been few compelling films of the kind that once made Paramount the industry leader.

Around the end of 1981, Paramount Pictures took over fellow Gulf and Western subsidiary Sega from the company's manufacturing division in an effort to get into the video game business. Paramount sold Sega following the video game industry crash of 1983, and the two companies would later work together on the live-action/CGI Sonic the Hedgehog film series.

On August 25, 1983, Paramount Studios caught fire. Two or three sound stages and four outdoor sets were destroyed.

When Charles Bluhdorn died unexpectedly, his successor, Martin Davis, dumped all of Gulf and Western's industrial, mining, and sugar-growing subsidiaries and refocused the company, renaming it Paramount Communications in 1989. With the influx of cash from the sale of Gulf and Western's industrial properties in the mid-1980s, Paramount bought a string of television stations and KECO Entertainment's theme park operations, renaming them Paramount Parks. These parks included Paramount's Great America, Paramount Canada's Wonderland, Paramount's Carowinds, Paramount's Kings Dominion, and Paramount's Kings Island.

In May 1985, Paramount decided to start its own talent department, an attempt to form a stable of exclusively contracted film personnel (outside of Eddie Murphy); this effort proved unsuccessful, and studio president Dawn Steel decided to shut down the department on July 30, 1986. In 1987, Paramount Pictures, MGM/UA Communications Co. and Universal Pictures teamed up in order to market feature film and television product to China, a response to the 25-billion admission tickets that were clocked in the country in 1986. Worldwide Media Sales, a division of the New York-based Worldwide Media Group, had been placed in charge of the undertaking. That year, Paramount Pictures decided to consolidate its distribution operations, closing a number of branch offices that were designed for the studio and relocating staff and major activities in an effort to cut costs and provide for a more efficient centralization; this decision was made in response to a change in distribution practices that had occurred among the various major studios. In August 1987, Paramount Overseas Productions declared that the subsidiary would be in service not just for the upcoming film Experts, which was shot on a budget of $12 million in Canada, but also for other films filmed there worldwide, including the United Kingdom and Canada.

In 1993, Sumner Redstone's entertainment conglomerate Viacom made a bid for a merger with Paramount Communications; this quickly escalated into a bidding war with Barry Diller's QVC. But Viacom prevailed, ultimately paying $10 billion for the Paramount holdings. Viacom and Paramount had planned to merge as early as 1989.

Paramount is the last major film studio located in Hollywood proper. When Paramount moved to its present home in 1927, it was in the heart of the film community. Since then, former next-door neighbor RKO closed up shop in 1957 (Paramount ultimately absorbed their former lot); Warner Bros. (whose old Sunset Boulevard studio was sold to Paramount in 1949 as a home for KTLA) moved to Burbank in 1930; Columbia joined Warners in Burbank in 1973 then moved again to Culver City in 1989; and the Pickford-Fairbanks-Goldwyn-United Artists lot, after a lively history, has been turned into a post-production and music-scoring facility for Warners, known simply as "The Lot". For a time, the semi-industrial neighborhood around Paramount was in decline, but it has now come back. The recently refurbished studio has come to symbolize Hollywood for many visitors, and its studio tour is a popular attraction.

=== 1989–1994: Paramount Communications ===
Paramount Communications, Inc.
- Type: Public
- Traded as: NYSE: PCI
- Industry: Media; Entertainment; Publishing
- Predecessor: Gulf and Western Inc.
- Founded: June 5, 1989
- Founder: Martin S. Davis
- Defunct: July 7, 1994
- Fate: Acquired and folded into Viacom
- Successor: Viacom
- Headquarters: Gulf and Western Building, New York City, United States
- Subsidiaries: Paramount Pictures; Simon & Schuster; Paramount Parks; Madison Square Garden; Famous Players; UCI Cinemas

In 1983, Gulf and Western began a restructuring process that would transform the corporation from a bloated conglomerate consisting of subsidiaries from unrelated industries to a more focused entertainment and publishing company. The idea was to aid financial markets in measuring the company's success, which, in turn, would help place a better value on its shares. Though its Paramount division did very well in recent years, Gulf and Western's success as a whole was translating poorly with investors. This process eventually led Davis to divest many of the company's subsidiaries. Its sugar plantations in Florida and the Dominican Republic were sold in 1985; the consumer and industrial products branch was sold off that same year. In 1989, Davis renamed the company Paramount Communications Incorporated after its primary asset, Paramount Pictures. The company's ticker symbol was changed from GW to PCI. In addition to the Paramount film, television, home video, and music publishing divisions, the company continued to own the Madison Square Garden properties (which also included MSG Network), a 50% stake in USA Networks (the other 50% was owned by MCA/Universal Pictures) and Simon & Schuster, Prentice Hall, Pocket Books, Allyn & Bacon, Cineamerica (a joint venture with Warner Communications), and Canadian cinema chain Famous Players Theatres.

That same year, the company launched a $12.2 billion hostile bid to acquire Time Inc. in an attempt to end a stock-swap merger deal between Time and Warner Communications. This caused Time to raise its bid for Warner to $14.9 billion in cash and stock. Gulf and Western responded by filing a lawsuit in a Delaware court to block the Time-Warner merger. The court ruled twice in favor of Time, forcing Gulf and Western to drop both the Time acquisition and the lawsuit, and allowing the formation of Time Warner.

Paramount used cash acquired from the sale of Gulf and Western's non-entertainment properties to take over the TVX Broadcast Group chain of television stations (which at that point consisted mainly of large-market stations which TVX had bought from Taft Broadcasting, plus two mid-market stations which TVX owned prior to the Taft purchase), and the KECO Entertainment chain of theme parks from Taft successor Great American Broadcasting. Both of these companies had their names changed to reflect new ownership: TVX became known as the Paramount Stations Group, while KECO was renamed to Paramount Parks.

Paramount Television launched Wilshire Court Productions in conjunction with USA Networks, before the latter was renamed NBCUniversal Cable, in 1989. Wilshire Court Productions (named for a side street in Los Angeles) produced television films that aired on the USA Networks, and later for other networks. USA Networks launched a second channel, the Sci-Fi Channel (now known as Syfy), in 1992. As its name implied, it focused on films and television series within the science fiction genre. Much of the initial programming was owned either by Paramount or Universal. Paramount bought one more television station in 1993: Cox Enterprises' WKBD-TV in Detroit, Michigan, at the time an affiliate of the Fox Broadcasting Company.

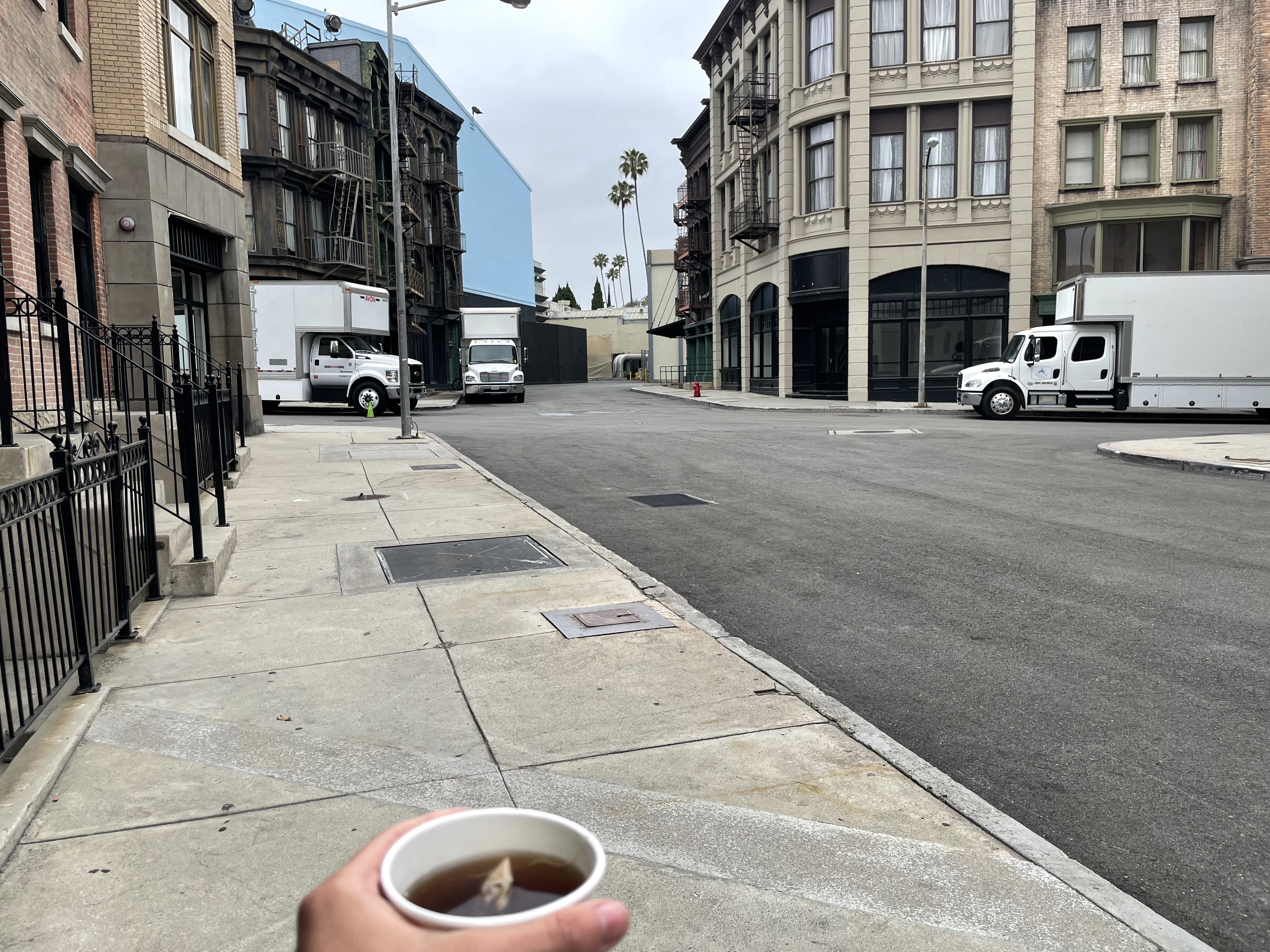
Paramount Backlot in between filming in 2024

=== 1994–2005: Dolgen/Lansing and "old" Viacom era ===
In February 1994, Viacom acquired 50.1% of Paramount Communications Inc. shares for $9.75 billion, following a five-month battle with QVC, and completed the merger in July. At the time, Paramount's holdings included Paramount Pictures, Madison Square Garden, the New York Rangers, the New York Knicks, and the Simon & Schuster publishing house. The deal had been planned as early as 1989, when the company was still known as Gulf and Western. Though Davis was named a member of the board of National Amusements, which controlled Viacom, he ceased to manage the company.

During this time period, Paramount Pictures went under the guidance of chairman Jonathan Dolgen and president Sherry Lansing. During their administration over Paramount, the studio had an extremely successful period of films with two of Paramount's ten highest-grossing films being produced during this period. The most successful of these films, Titanic, co-produced with 20th Century Fox and Lightstorm Entertainment, became the highest-grossing film up to that time, grossing over $1.8 billion worldwide. Also during this time, three Paramount Pictures films won the Academy Award for Best Picture; Titanic, Braveheart, and Forrest Gump.

Paramount's most important property, however, was Star Trek. Studio executives had begun to call it "the franchise" in the 1980s due to its reliable revenue, and other studios envied its "untouchable and unduplicatable" success. By 1998, Star Trek television shows, movies, books, videotapes, and licensing provided so much of the studio's profit that "it is not possible to spend any reasonable amount of time at Paramount and not be aware of [its] presence"; filming for Star Trek: Voyager and Star Trek: Deep Space Nine required up to nine of the largest of the studio's 36 sound stages.

In 1995, Viacom and Chris-Craft Industries' United Television launched United Paramount Network (UPN) with Star Trek: Voyager as its flagship series, fulfilling Barry Diller's plan for a Paramount network from 25 years earlier. In 1999, Viacom bought out United Television's interests, and handed responsibility for the start-up network to the newly acquired CBS unit, which Viacom bought in 2000 – an ironic confluence of events as Paramount had once invested in CBS, and Viacom had once been the syndication arm of CBS, as well. During this period the studio acquired some 30 television stations to support the UPN network, also acquiring and merging in the assets of Republic Pictures, Spelling Television and Viacom Productions, almost doubling the size of the studio's television library. The television division produced big hits like Frasier, as well as such long-running hits as NCIS and Becker and the dominant prime time magazine show Entertainment Tonight. Paramount also gained the ownership rights to the Rysher library, after Viacom acquired the rights from Cox Enterprises.

During this period, Paramount and its related subsidiaries and affiliates, operating under the name "Viacom Entertainment Group" also included the fourth largest group of theme parks in the United States and Canada, which, in addition to traditional rides and attractions, launched numerous successful location-based entertainment units, including a long-running "Star Trek" attraction at the Las Vegas Hilton. Famous Music – the company's celebrated music publishing arm almost doubled in size and developed artists including Pink, Bush, and Green Day, as well as catalog favorites including Duke Ellington and Henry Mancini. The Paramount/Viacom licensing group under the leadership of Tom McGrath created the "Cheers" franchise bars and restaurants and a chain of restaurants borrowing from the studio's Academy Award-winning film Forrest Gump – The Bubba Gump Shrimp Company. Through the combined efforts of Famous Music and the studio over ten "Broadway" musicals were created including Irving Berlin's White Christmas, Footloose, Saturday Night Fever, Andrew Lloyd Webber's Sunset Boulevard among others. The company's international arm, United International Pictures (UIP), was the dominant distributor internationally for ten straight years representing Paramount, Universal and MGM. Simon and Schuster became part of the Viacom Entertainment Group emerging as the United States' dominant trade book publisher.

In 2002, Paramount; along with Buena Vista Distribution, 20th Century Fox, Sony Pictures Entertainment, MGM/UA Entertainment, Universal Studios, DreamWorks Pictures, Artisan Entertainment, Lions Gate Entertainment, and Warner Bros. Entertainment formed the Digital Cinema Initiatives. Operating under a waiver from the antitrust law, the studios combined under the leadership of Paramount Chief Operating Officer Tom McGrath to develop technical standards for the eventual introduction of digital film projection – replacing the now 100-year-old film technology. DCI was created "to establish and document voluntary specifications for an open architecture for digital cinema that ensures a uniform and high level of technical performance, reliability and quality control." McGrath also headed up Paramount's initiative for the creation and launch of the Blu-ray Disc.

=== 2005–2019: "New" Viacom era ===
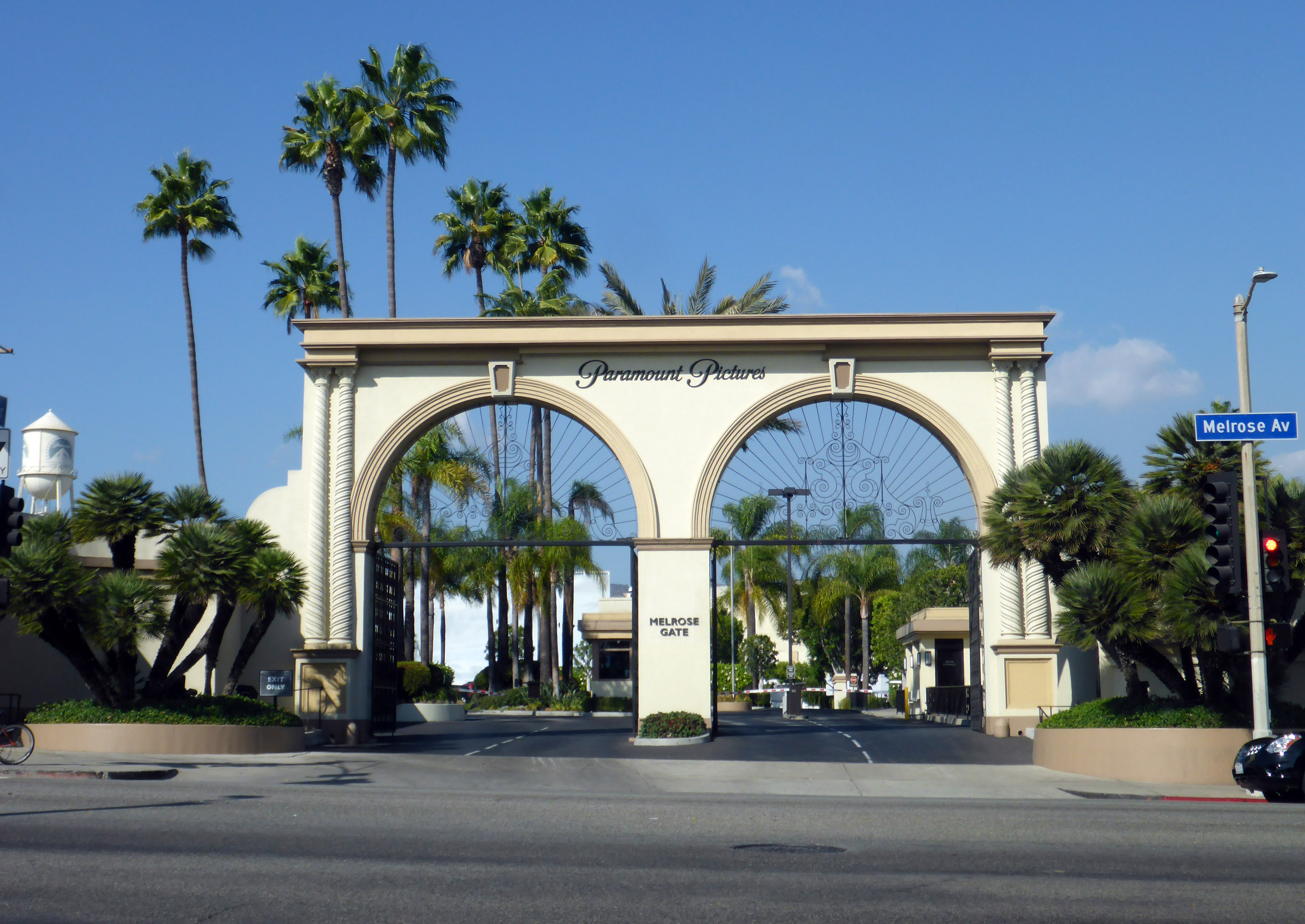
Paramount Pictures' studio lot in Hollywood (Melrose Gate entrance)

On December 11, 2005, the Paramount Motion Pictures Group announced that it had purchased DreamWorks SKG (which was co-founded by former Paramount executive Jeffrey Katzenberg) in a deal worth $1.6 billion. The announcement was made by Brad Grey, chairman and CEO of Paramount Pictures who noted that enhancing Paramount's pipeline of pictures is a "key strategic objective in restoring Paramount's stature as a leader in filmed entertainment." While the agreement did not include DreamWorks Animation SKG Inc., the most profitable part of the company that went public the previous year, Paramount became the distributor of DreamWorks Animation films from 2006 to 2012. 20th Century Fox would take over distribution beginning in 2013 to 2016, followed by Universal Pictures permanently from 2016 following NBCUniversal's acquisition of the animated studio in 2016.

Reflecting in part the troubles of the broadcasting business, in 2005 Viacom wrote off over $18 billion from its radio acquisitions and, early that year, announced that it would split itself in two. With that announcement, Dolgen and Lansing were replaced by former television executives Brad Grey and Gail Berman. The Viacom board split the company into CBS Corporation and a separate company under the Viacom name. The board scheduled the division for the first quarter of 2006. Under the plan, CBS Corporation would comprise the CBS and UPN networks, Viacom Television Stations, Infinity Broadcasting Corporation, Viacom Outdoor, CBS/Paramount Television, King World Productions, Showtime Networks, Simon & Schuster, Paramount Parks, and CBS News. The revamped Viacom would include "MTV, VH1, Nickelodeon, BET and several other cable networks, as well as the Paramount movie studio". The split was completed on December 31, 2005. Paramount's home entertainment unit began using the CBS DVD brand for the CBS/Paramount Television library, as both Viacom and CBS Corporation were controlled by Sumner Redstone's National Amusements.

In August 22, 2006, it was announced that Nickelodeon Movies and MTV Films would become labels within the Paramount Motion Picture Group, moving oversight from MTV Networks to Paramount. As part of these changes, longtime studio producer Scott Aversano was appointed to become president of both labels and will also be involved in image and brand-related matters working alongside MTV Networks Music Group president Van Toffler and Nickelodeon/MTV Networks Kids & Family Group president Cyma Zarghami.

Grey also broke up the famous United International Pictures (UIP) international distribution company with 15 countries being taken over by Paramount or Universal by December 31, 2006, with the joint venture continuing in 20 markets. In Australia, Brazil, France, Ireland, Mexico, New Zealand, and the United Kingdom, Paramount took over UIP. While in Austria, Belgium, Germany, Italy, the Netherlands, Russia, Spain, and Switzerland, Universal took over and Paramount would build its own distribution operations there. In 2007 and 2008, Paramount may sub-distribute films via Universal's countries and vice versa. Paramount's international distribution unit would be headquartered in Los Angeles and have a European hub. In Italy, Paramount distributed through Universal. With Universal indicated that it was pulling out of the UIP Korea and started its own operation there in November 2016, Paramount agreed to have CJ Entertainment distribute there. UIP president and chief operating officer Andrew Cripps was hired as Paramount Pictures International head. Paramount Pictures International distributed films that made the 1 billion mark in July 2007; the fifth studio that year to do so and it its first year.

On October 6, 2008, DreamWorks executives announced that they were leaving Paramount and relaunching an independent DreamWorks, which would later become DreamWorks Studios. The DreamWorks trademarks remained with DreamWorks Animation when that company was spun off before the Paramount purchase, and DreamWorks Animation transferred the license to the name to the new company.

DreamWorks films, acquired by Paramount but still distributed internationally by Universal, are included in Paramount's market share. Grey also launched a Digital Entertainment division to take advantage of emerging digital distribution technologies. This led to Paramount becoming the second movie studio to sign a deal with Apple Inc. to sell its films through the iTunes Store.

In 2007, Paramount sold Famous Music—its publishing arm since the "Famous Players" era—to Sony/ATV, ending a nearly eight-decade run.

In early 2008, Paramount partnered with Los Angeles-based developer FanRocket to make short scenes taken from its film library available to users on Facebook. The application, called VooZoo, allows users to send movie clips to other Facebook users and to post clips on their profile pages. Paramount engineered a similar deal with Makena Technologies to allow users of vMTV and There.com to view and send movie clips.

In 2009, CBS Corporation stopped using the Paramount name in its series and changed the name of the production arm to CBS Television Studios, eliminating the Paramount name from television, to distance itself from the latter.

In March 2010, Paramount founded Insurge Pictures, an independent distributor of "micro budget" films. The distributor planned ten movies with budgets of $100,000 each. The first release was The Devil Inside, a movie with a budget of about US$1 million. In March 2015, following waning box office returns, Paramount folded Insurge Pictures and its operations into the main studio.

In July 2011, in the wake of critical and box office success of the animated feature, Rango, and the departure of DreamWorks Animation upon completion of their distribution contract in 2012, Paramount announced the formation of a new division, devoted to the creation of animated productions. It marks Paramount's return to having its own animated division for the first time since 1967, when Paramount Cartoon Studios shut down (it was formerly Famous Studios until 1956).

In December 2013, Walt Disney Studios (via its parent company's purchase of Lucasfilm a year earlier) gained Paramount's remaining distribution and marketing rights to future Indiana Jones films. Paramount permanently retained the distribution rights to the first four films and received "financial participation" from any additional films.

In February 2016, Viacom CEO and newly appointed chairman Philippe Dauman announced that the conglomerate was in talks to find an investor to purchase a minority stake in Paramount. Sumner Redstone and his daughter Shari were reportedly opposed to the deal. On July 13, 2016, Wanda Group was in talks to acquire a 49% stake of Paramount. The talks with Wanda were dropped. On January 19, 2017, Shanghai Film Group Corp. and Huahua Media said they would finance at least 25% of all Paramount Pictures movies over a three-year period. Shanghai Film Group and Huahua Media, in the deal, would help distribute and market Paramount's features in China. At the time, the Wall Street Journal wrote that "nearly every major Hollywood studio has a co-financing deal with a Chinese company."

On March 27, 2017, Jim Gianopulos was named as a chairman and CEO of Paramount Pictures, replacing Brad Grey. In June 2017, Paramount Players was formed by the studio with the hiring of Brian Robbins, founder of AwesomenessTV, Tollin/Robbins Productions and Varsity Pictures, as the division's president. The division was expected to produce films based on the Viacom Media Networks properties including MTV, Nickelodeon, BET and Comedy Central. In June 2017, Paramount Pictures signed a deal with 20th Century Fox for distribution of its films in Italy, which took effect on September. Prior to the deal, Paramount's films in Italy were distributed by Universal Pictures, a deal that dates back to the CIC era.

On December 7, 2017, it was reported that Paramount sold the international distribution rights of Annihilation to Netflix. Netflix subsequently bought the worldwide rights to The Cloverfield Paradox for $50 million. On November 16, 2018, Paramount signed a multi-picture film deal with Netflix as part of Viacom's growth strategy, making Paramount the first major film studio to do so.

In April 2018, Paramount posted its first quarterly profit since 2015. Bob Bakish, CEO of parent Viacom, said in a statement that turnaround efforts "have firmly taken hold as the studio improved margins and returned to profitability. This month's outstanding box-office performance of A Quiet Place, the first film produced and released under the new team at Paramount, is a clear sign of our progress."

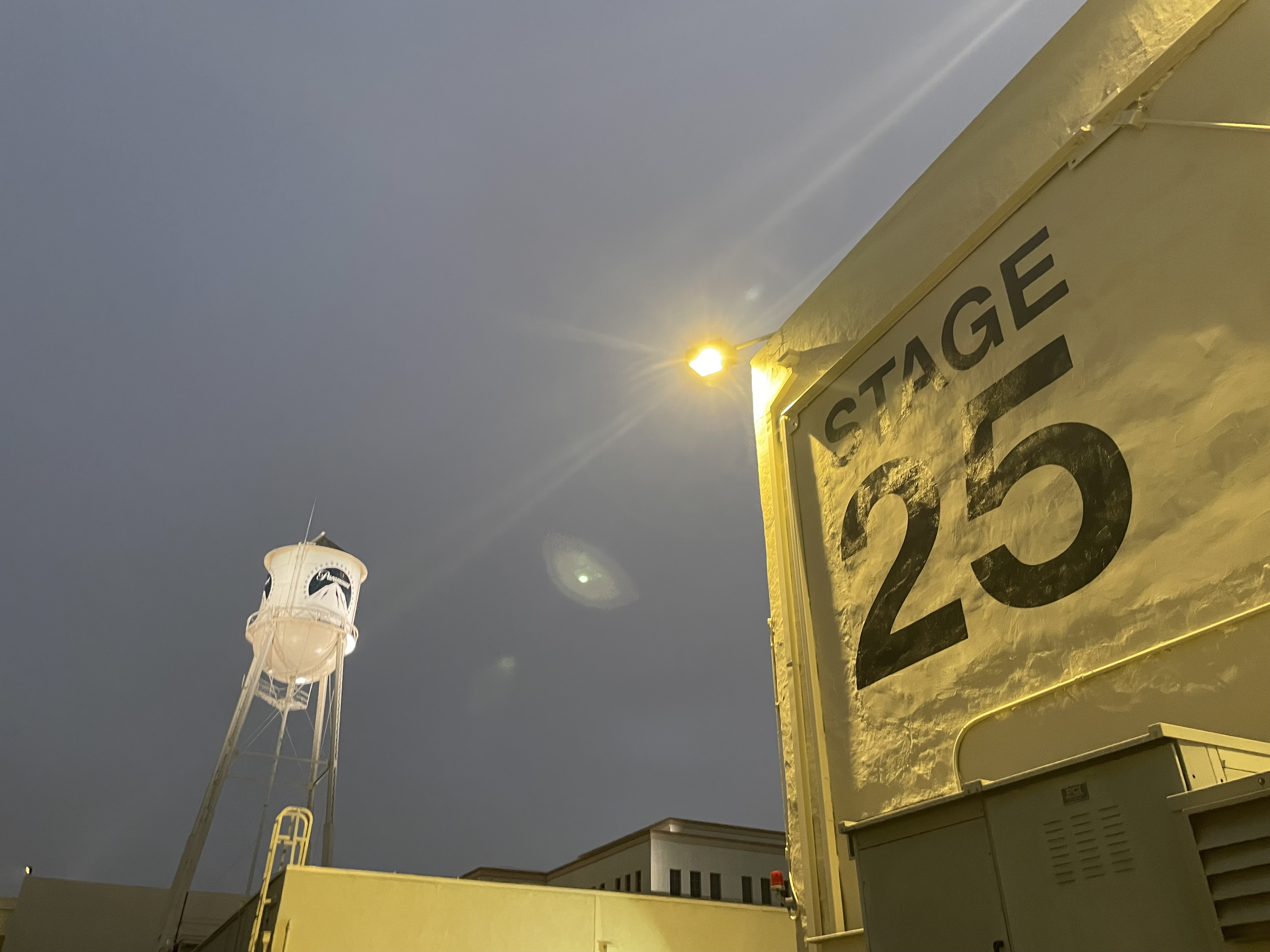
Paramount Studios watertower and Stage 25 in 2024

=== 2019–2025: ViacomCBS/Paramount Global era ===
On September 29, 2016, National Amusements sent a letter to both CBS Corporation and Viacom, encouraging the two companies to merge back into one company. On December 12, the deal was called off. On May 30, 2019, CNBC reported that CBS and Viacom would explore merger discussions in mid-June 2019. Reports say that CBS and Viacom reportedly set August 8 as an informal deadline for reaching an agreement to recombine the two media companies. CBS announced to acquire Viacom as part of the re-merger for up to $15.4 billion. On August 2, 2019, the two companies agreed to remerge back into one entity, which was named ViacomCBS; the deal was closed on December 4, 2019.

In December 2019, ViacomCBS agreed to purchase a 49% stake in Miramax that was owned by beIN Media Group, with Paramount gaining the distribution of the studio's 700-film library, as well as its future releases. Also, Paramount would produce television series based on Miramax's IPs. The deal officially closed on April 3, 2020. ViacomCBS later announced that it would rebrand the CBS All Access streaming service as Paramount+ to allow for international expansion using the widely recognized Paramount name and drawing from the studio's library, as well as that of CBS, MTV, Nickelodeon, and more.

Gianopulos was fired in September 2021 and replaced by Nickelodeon president Brian Robbins.

In January 2022, Paramount Pictures acquired the rights to Tomi Adeyemi's young adult fantasy novel Children of Blood and Bone from Lucasfilm and 20th Century Studios. As part of the acquisition, the film would have a guaranteed exclusive theatrical release while Adeyemi would write the screenplay and serve as executive producer. The film adaptation is also be produced by Temple Hill Entertainment and Sunswept Entertainment.

On February 16, 2022, ViacomCBS changed its name to Paramount Global, after the studio.

On March 8, 2022, Paramount Players' operations were folded into Paramount Pictures Motion Picture Group. However, it continues to operate as a label as it has several upcoming films on its slate.

On November 15, 2022, Paramount entered a multi-year exclusive deal with former president of DC Films Walter Hamada. Hamada oversaw the development of horror films beginning in 2023.

=== 2025–present: Skydance era ===
In 2024, terms were set for the merger between Paramount Global and Skydance Media, at a valuation of $28 billion. Negotiations continued into 2025 among the investment teams with David Ellison, the CEO of Skydance, and Shari Redstone. In July 2025, the merger received regulatory approval, setting a path for Ellison to become CEO of Paramount. The deal closed the following month, forming Paramount Skydance.

In July 2026, it was reported that Paramount was among several parties—including Netflix and Sony Pictures Entertainment—in early talks to buy online film discovery platform Letterboxd. The following October, Paramount Pictures' parent company acquired Warner Bros. Discovery and was renamed Skydance. A month later, Skydance Motion Picture Group announced that Kira Goldberg and Don Granger would run Paramount.

== Investments ==
=== DreamWorks Pictures ===
In 2006, Paramount became the parent of DreamWorks Pictures. Soros Strategic Partners and Dune Entertainment II soon afterwards acquired controlling interest in live-action films released through DreamWorks, with the release of Just Like Heaven on September 16, 2005. The remaining live-action films released until March 2006 remained under direct Paramount control. However, Paramount still owns distribution and other ancillary rights to Soros and Dune films.

On February 8, 2010, Viacom repurchased Soros' controlling stake in DreamWorks' library of films released before 2005 for around $400 million. Even as DreamWorks switched distribution of live-action films not part of existing franchises to Walt Disney Studios Motion Pictures for post-2010 titles beginning with I Am Number Four (2011) and ending with The Light Between Oceans (September 2016). Universal Pictures later took over distribution for DreamWorks' films beginning with The Girl on the Train (October 2016) as part of a distribution deal via the studio's new parent company, Amblin Partners, which NBCUniversal later acquired a minority stake in 2017.

Paramount continues to own the films released before the merger, and the films that Paramount themselves distributed, including sequel rights such as that of Little Fockers (2010), distributed by Paramount and DreamWorks. It was a sequel to two existing DreamWorks films, Meet the Parents (2000) and Meet the Fockers (2004). Paramount only owned the international distribution rights to Little Fockers, whereas Universal Pictures handled domestic distribution.

Paramount also owned distribution rights to the DreamWorks Animation (DWA) library of films made before 2013, and their previous distribution deal with future DWA titles expired at the end of 2012, with Rise of the Guardians. 20th Century Fox took over distribution for post-2012 titles beginning with The Croods (2013) and ending with Captain Underpants: The First Epic Movie (2017). Universal Pictures subsequently took over distribution for DreamWorks Animation's films beginning with How to Train Your Dragon: The Hidden World (2019) due to NBCUniversal's acquisition of the company in 2016. Paramount's rights to the 1998–2012 DWA library would have expired 16 years after each film's initial theatrical release date, but in July 2014, DreamWorks Animation purchased Paramount's distribution rights to the pre-2013 library, with 20th Century Fox distributing the library until January 2018, which Universal then assumed ownership of distribution rights.

Another asset of the former DreamWorks owned by Paramount is the pre-2008 DreamWorks Television library, which is currently distributed by Paramount's subsidiary Paramount Media Networks. It includes Spin City, High Incident, Freaks and Geeks, Undeclared and On the Lot.

=== CBS library ===
Independent company Hollywood Classics represents Paramount with the theatrical distribution of all the films produced by the various motion picture divisions of CBS over the years, as a result of the 2000 Viacom/CBS merger.

Paramount has outright video distribution to the aforementioned CBS library with some exceptions; less-demanded content is usually released manufactured-on-demand by CBS themselves or licensed to Visual Entertainment Inc. As of the 2019 Viacom/CBS merger, this library now includes the theatrical distribution of Terrytoons short films on behalf of Paramount Animation, while CBS Media Ventures owns the television distribution. Until 2009, the video rights to My Fair Lady were with original theatrical distributor Warner Bros. Pictures, under license from CBS. The video license to that film has now reverted to Paramount.

== Units ==
=== Divisions ===
- Paramount Home Entertainment
  - Paramount DVD
  - Paramount High Definition (HD DVD and Blu-Ray)
  - Paramount Presents
- Paramount Licensing, Inc.
- Paramount Pictures Domestic Distribution
- Paramount Pictures International
- Paramount Players
- Nickelodeon Movies
- Paramount Primal
- Paramount Studio Group – physical studio and post production
  - The Studios at Paramount – production facilities & lot
  - Paramount on Location – production support facilities throughout North America including New York City, Vancouver, and Atlanta
  - Worldwide Technical Operations – archives, restoration and preservation programs, the mastering and distribution fulfillment services, on-lot post production facilities management
- Paramount Animation
- Paramount Music
- Paramount Sports Entertainment
  - Skydance Sports
- Skydance Animation
  - Skydance Animation Madrid

==== Joint ventures ====
- United International Pictures (co-owned with Comcast's Universal Pictures)
- Miramax (co-owned with BeIN Media Group)

=== Former divisions, subsidiaries, and joint ventures ===
- Paramount Digital Entertainment (Dormant)
- Paramount Television (original) (now CBS Studios)
  - Big Ticket Entertainment (semi-in-name-only since 2006; currently produces The Drew Barrymore Show and Hot Bench)
  - Spelling Television (in-name-only since 2006)
  - Viacom Productions (folded into PNT in 2004)
  - Wilshire Court Productions (shut down in 2003)
  - Paramount Domestic Television (now CBS Media Ventures)
    - Folded Viacom Enterprises in 1995 and Rysher Entertainment and Worldvision Enterprises in 1999
    - RTV News, Inc., producer of Real TV and Maximum Exposure
  - United Paramount Network (UPN) – formerly a joint venture with United Television, now part of Nexstar/Paramount Global/Warner Bros. Discovery joint venture The CW Television Network
  - Paramount Stations Group (now CBS News and Stations)
  - USA Networks (also including the Sci-Fi Channel) – Paramount owned a stake starting in 1982, 50% owner (with Universal Pictures) from 1987 until 1997, when Paramount/Viacom sold their stake to Universal (now part of NBCUniversal)
  - Paramount International Television – merged with CBS Broadcast International in 2004 to form CBS Studios International
- Paramount Television Studios – second television division (2013–2024); operations folded into CBS Studios
  - Paramount Worldwide Television Licensing & Distribution – merged in 2020 with CBS Studios International to form ViacomCBS Global Distribution Group
- Fleischer Studios – purchased in 1942 and organized as Famous Studios (which shut down in 1967); library folded into Paramount Animation.
- Terrytoons – purchased by CBS Films (later Viacom International) in 1956; theatrical library moved to Paramount Animation following re-merger of ViacomCBS in 2019.
- Paramount Famous Productions – direct-to-video division (2007–2011)
- Paramount Parks – purchased by Cedar Fair Entertainment Company in 2006
- Paramount Classics/Paramount Vantage – Paramount Classics merged into Paramount Vantage; the latter then went dormant in December 2013
- DW Studios, LLC (also DW Pictures) – defunct, holding film library and rights, principal officers left to recreate DreamWorks as an independent company
  - DW Funding LLC – DreamWorks live-action library (pre-09/16/2005; DW Funding, LLC) sold to Soros Strategic Partners and Dune Entertainment II and purchased back in 2010
  - Go Fish Pictures – Arthouse/Independent film unit for used distributing DreamWorks Pictures foreign films; defunct in 2007 after parent company's sale
- Paramount Theatres Limited – Founded 1930 in the United Kingdom with the opening of a cinema in Manchester. Several Paramount Theatres had opened or had been acquired in the United Kingdom during the 1930s before being sold to The Rank Organisation becoming part of the Odeon Cinemas chain in 1939.
- Epix (now MGM+) – 49.76% owner (with Metro–Goldwyn–Mayer and Lionsgate) from 2009 until 2017, when Paramount/Viacom and Lionsgate sold their stakes to MGM
- Insurge Pictures – micro-budget film division (March 2010 – 2015); absorbed into Paramount itself
- Republic Pictures
- "Continental Café" – the commissary run by Pauline Kessinger until the cafe was replaced by the Zukor Building in 1983.
- Rede Telecine (co-owned with Amazon's Metro-Goldwyn Mayer, The Walt Disney Company's The Walt Disney Company Latin America, Grupo Globo's Canais Globo and Comcast's Universal Pictures)

=== Other interests ===
In March 2012, Paramount licensed their name and logo to a luxury hotel investment group, which named the company Paramount Hotels and Resorts. The investors plan to build 50 hotels throughout the world based on the themes of Hollywood and the California lifestyle. Among the features are private screening rooms and the Paramount library available in the hotel rooms. In April 2013, Paramount Hotels and Dubai-based DAMAC Properties announced the building of the first resort: "DAMAC Towers by Paramount."

== Logo ==
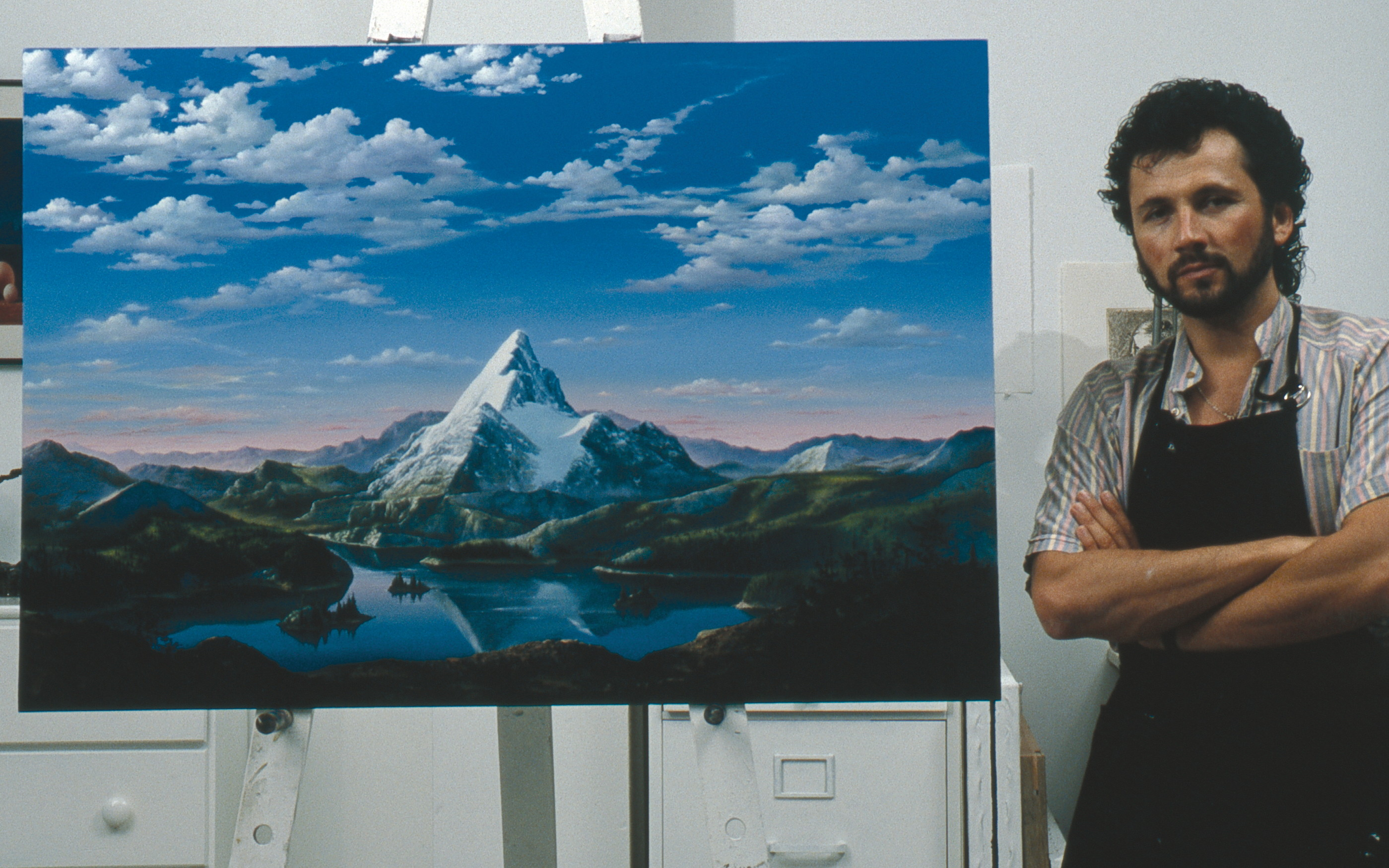
Artist Dario Campanile poses with a picture Paramount commissioned him in 1986 to paint for its 75th anniversary. The company later used the painting as a basis for its new logo. That logo was introduced as a prototype in the 1986 film The Golden Child; the 1987 film Critical Condition are both the first to feature the finalized version of the logo. 1999's South Park: Bigger, Longer & Uncut was the first to use an enhanced version of the logo, which was last used on 2002's Crossroads.

The distinctively pyramidal Paramount mountain has been the mainstay of the company's production logo since its inception and is the oldest surviving Hollywood film logo. In the sound era, the logo was accompanied by a fanfare called Paramount on Parade after the film of the same name, released in 1930. The words to the fanfare, originally sung in the 1930 film, were "Proud of the crowd that will never be loud, it's Paramount on Parade."

The original Paramount Pictures logo was possibly modeled after Ben Lomond, Utah. Hodkinson, who was a native of the Ogden area, allegedly drew the initial version of the logo – Ben Lomond, drawn from memory, with a border of stars, which later became a partial circle surrounding the mountain – on a napkin during a meeting in 1914.

The motion picture logo has gone through many changes over the years:

- The logo began as a somewhat indistinct charcoal rendering of the mountain ringed with superimposed stars. The logo originally had twenty-four stars, as a tribute to the then current system of contracts for actors, since Paramount had twenty-four stars signed at the time.
- In 1951, the logo was redesigned as a matte painting created by Jan Domela.
- A newer, more realistic-looking logo debuted in 1953 for Paramount films made in 3D. It was reworked in early-to-mid 1954 for Paramount films made in widescreen process VistaVision. The text VistaVision – Motion Picture High Fidelity was often imposed over the Paramount logo briefly before dissolving into the title sequence. In early 1968, the text "A Paramount Picture/Release" was shortened to "Paramount", the byline A Gulf+Western Company since the Gulf+Western owns Paramount Pictures Corporation in 1966 appeared on the bottom, and the number of stars being reduced to 22. In 1974, another redesign was made, with the Paramount text and Gulf+Western byline appearing in different fonts.
- In May or June 1975, the logo was simplified in a shade of blue, adopting the modified design of the 1968 print logo, which was in use for many decades afterward. A version of the print logo had been in use by Paramount Television since 1968, for the first movie of the 1975 horror movie Bug (1975) at the end.
- A black and white logo with "A Paramount Picture" appeared in the 1980 live action film Popeye, resembling the one used on Paramount's classic Popeye cartoon shorts.
- The studio launched an entirely new logo in December 1986 with computer-generated imagery of a lake and stars. This version of the Paramount logo was designed by Dario Campanile and animated by Flip Your Lid Animation (Studio Productions), Omnibus/Abel for the CGI stars and Apogee, Inc for the mountain; for this logo, the stars would move across the screen into the arc shape instead of it being superimposed over the mountain as it was before. A redone version of this logo by Pittard Sullivan and animated by Helium Productions made its debut with South Park: Bigger, Longer & Uncut, released on June 30, 1999.

For its 90th anniversary, Paramount adopted the logo shown here. In 2012, it was used in tandem with the current one. This picture shows the 2010 modification of the logo, which includes Viacom's revised byline introduced in 2006. The first film to use the revised Viacom byline was Iron Man 2.

- In March 2002, an updated logo by Kaleidoscope Films and animated by BUF Compagnie was introduced in which shooting stars would fall from a night sky to form the arc while the Paramount logo would fly into place between them. An enhanced version of this logo made by PIC Collective debuted with Iron Man 2, released on May 7, 2010. The south col area of Mount Everest became the primary basis. The music is accompanied by Paramount on Parade, which was only used on Mean Girls. This logo continued to be featured on DVD and Blu-ray releases with the first incarnation of Viacom byline until March 5, 2019, ending with Instant Family.
- On December 16, 2011, an updated logo was introduced with animation done by Devastudios, using Terragen and Autodesk Maya. The new logo includes a surrounding mountain range and the sun shining in the background. Michael Giacchino composed the logo's new fanfare. His work on the fanfare was carried onto the Paramount Players and Paramount Animation logos, as well as the Paramount Television Studios logo, which is also used for the Paramount Network Original Productions logo with 68 Whiskey.
- The word "Pictures" was restored to the bottom of the Paramount logo in 2022 after ViacomCBS took on the Paramount name and branding for its entire operation; this revised logo used for printed materials and merchandising, while still appearing as simply "Paramount" on-screen, no longer uses the byline.
- In August 2025, following the formation of Paramount Skydance, the byline "A Skydance Corporation," was added below the logo and the mountain is slightly redrawn. It later switched to "A Skydance Company" byline after the merger with Warner Bros. on October 6, 2026, and the first film to utilize the new Skydance byline is Ebenezer.

== Filmography ==
A few years after the ruling of the United States v. Paramount Pictures, Inc. case in 1948, Music Corporation of America (MCA) approached Paramount offering $50 million for 750 sound feature films released prior to December 1, 1949, with payment to be spread over a period of several years. Paramount saw this as a bargain since the fleeting movie studio saw very little value in its library of old films at the time. To address any antitrust concerns, MCA set up EMKA, Ltd. as a dummy corporation to sell these films to television. EMKA's/Universal Television's library includes the five Paramount Marx Brothers films, most of the Bob Hope–Bing Crosby Road to... pictures, and other classics such as Trouble in Paradise, Shanghai Express, She Done Him Wrong, Remember the Night, Sullivan's Travels, The Palm Beach Story, For Whom the Bell Tolls, Double Indemnity, The Lost Weekend, and The Heiress.

=== Highest-grossing films ===
Highest-grossing films in the United States and Canada
Rank	Title	Year	Gross
1	Top Gun: Maverick ‡	2022	$721,996,984
2	Titanic ‡ ^{1}	1997	$674,354,882
3	Transformers: Revenge of the Fallen	2009	$402,111,870
4	Transformers: Dark of the Moon	2011	$352,390,543
5	Forrest Gump ‡	1994	$330,252,182
6	Shrek the Third ^{2}	2007	$322,719,944
7	Transformers	2007	$319,246,193
8	Iron Man ^{3}	2008	$318,412,101
9	Indiana Jones and the Kingdom of the Crystal Skull	2008	$317,101,119
10	Iron Man 2 ^{3}	2010	$312,433,331
11	Star Trek	2009	$257,730,019
12	Raiders of the Lost Ark ‡	1981	$248,159,971
13	Transformers: Age of Extinction	2014	$245,439,076
14	Shrek Forever After ^{2}	2010	$238,736,787
15	Sonic the Hedgehog 3	2024	$236,086,990
16	Beverly Hills Cop	1984	$234,760,478
17	War of the Worlds	2005	$234,280,354
18	Star Trek Into Darkness	2013	$228,778,661
19	Mission: Impossible – Fallout	2018	$220,159,104
20	Ghost	1990	$217,631,306
21	How to Train Your Dragon ^{2}	2010	$217,581,231
22	Madagascar 3: Europe's Most Wanted ^{2}	2012	$216,391,482
23	Kung Fu Panda ^{2}	2008	$215,434,591
24	Mission: Impossible 2	2000	$215,409,889
25	Mission: Impossible – Ghost Protocol	2011	$209,397,903

Highest-grossing films worldwide
Rank	Title	Year	Gross
1	Titanic ‡ ^{1}	1997	$2,264,812,968
2	Top Gun: Maverick ‡	2022	$1,503,260,455
3	Transformers: Dark of the Moon	2011	$1,123,794,079
4	Transformers: Age of Extinction	2014	$1,104,054,072
5	Transformers: Revenge of the Fallen	2009	$836,303,693
6	Shrek the Third ^{2}	2007	$813,367,380
7	Mission: Impossible – Fallout	2018	$791,017,452
8	Indiana Jones and the Kingdom of the Crystal Skull	2008	$786,636,033
9	Interstellar	2014	$758,690,230
10	Shrek Forever After ^{2}	2010	$752,600,867
11	Madagascar 3: Europe's Most Wanted ^{2}	2012	$746,921,274
12	Transformers	2007	$709,709,780
13	Mission: Impossible – Ghost Protocol	2011	$694,713,380
14	Mission: Impossible – Rogue Nation	2015	$682,330,139
15	Forrest Gump ‡	1994	$677,945,399
16	Kung Fu Panda 2 ^{2}	2011	$665,692,281
17	Kung Fu Panda ^{2}	2008	$631,744,560
18	Iron Man 2 ^{3}	2010	$623,933,331
19	Transformers: The Last Knight	2017	$605,425,157
20	Madagascar: Escape 2 Africa ^{2}	2008	$603,900,354
21	War of the Worlds	2005	$603,873,119
22	Mission: Impossible – The Final Reckoning	2025	$598,767,057
23	Iron Man ^{3}	2008	$585,174,222
24	Mission: Impossible – Dead Reckoning Part One	2023	$571,125,435
25	Puss in Boots ^{2}	2011	$554,987,477

‡ — Includes theatrical reissue(s)

== Latino and Hispanic representation ==
On July 31, 2018, Paramount was targeted by the National Hispanic Media Coalition and the National Latino Media Council, which have both claimed that the studio has the worst track record of hiring Latino and Hispanic talent both in front of and behind the camera (the last Paramount film directed by a Hispanic director was Rings in 2017). In response, Paramount released the statement: "We recently met with NHMC in a good faith effort to see how we could partner as we further drive Paramount's culture of diversity, inclusion, and belonging. Under our new leadership team, we continue to make progress — including ensuring representation in front of and behind the camera in upcoming films such as Dora the Explorer, Instant Family, Bumblebee, and Limited Partners – and welcome the opportunity to build and strengthen relationships with the Latino creative community further."

The NHMC protested at the Paramount Pictures lot on August 25. More than 60 protesters attended, while chanting "Latinos excluded, time to be included!". NHMC president and CEO Alex Nogales vowed to continue the boycott until the studio signed a memorandum of understanding.

On October 17, the NHMC protested at the Paramount film lot for the second time in two months, with 75 protesters attending. The leaders delivered a petition signed by 12,307 people and addressed it to Jim Gianopulos.

== See also ==
- List of Paramount Pictures executives
- List of Paramount Skydance television programs

== Notes ==
1. The film grossed $2,264,812,968 worldwide, but the $1,590,450,697 of the film's box office belong to 20th Century Fox, which released the film internationally, Paramount owns North American distribution only.
2. In July 2014, the film's distribution rights were purchased by DreamWorks Animation from Paramount and transferred to 20th Century Fox. In January 2018, they were transferred to Universal Pictures.
3. In July 2013, the film's distribution rights were transferred from Paramount to The Walt Disney Studios.
