= Flashdance =

1983 American romantic drama film by Adrian Lyne

- Theatrical release poster
- Directed by: Adrian Lyne
- Screenplay by: Tom Hedley; Joe Eszterhas
- Story by: Tom Hedley
- Produced by: Don Simpson; Jerry Bruckheimer
- Starring: Jennifer Beals; Michael Nouri
- Cinematography: Donald Peterman
- Edited by: Walt Mulconery; Bud Smith
- Music by: Giorgio Moroder
- Production company: PolyGram Pictures
- Distributed by: Paramount Pictures
- Release dates: April 14, 1983 (Warner Theater); April 15, 1983 (United States)
- Running time: 97 minutes
- Country: United States
- Language: English
- Budget: $7 million
- Box office: $201.5 million

Flashdance is a 1983 American romantic drama dance film directed by Adrian Lyne and starring Jennifer Beals as a passionate young dancer, Alex Owens, who aspires to become a professional ballerina, alongside Michael Nouri, who plays her boyfriend and the owner of the steel mill where she works by day in Pittsburgh.

It was the first collaboration of producers Don Simpson and Jerry Bruckheimer, and the presentation of some sequences in the style of music videos was an influence on other 1980s films including Footloose, Purple Rain, and Top Gun, Simpson and Bruckheimer's most famous production. It was also one of Lyne's first major film releases, building on television commercials. Alex's elaborate dance sequences were shot using body doubles (Beals' main double was the uncredited French actress Marine Jahan, while a breakdance move was doubled by the male dancer Crazy Legs).

Flashdance premiered at the Warner Theater on April 14, 1983, before being released by Paramount Pictures on April 15, 1983. The film opened to negative reviews by professional critics, including Roger Ebert, who panned it as "great sound and flashdance, signifying nothing" (and eventually placed it on his "most hated" list). It was a surprise box-office success, becoming the third-highest-grossing film of 1983 in the United States. Its worldwide box-office gross exceeded $200 million. The soundtrack, compiled by Giorgio Moroder, spawned several hit songs, including "Maniac" (performed by Michael Sembello), and the Academy Award–winning "Flashdance... What a Feeling", which was written for the film by Moroder, with lyrics by Keith Forsey and the singer Irene Cara. Flashdance is also often remembered for its film poster featuring Beals sporting a sweatshirt with a large neck hole (according to the actress, her look in the scene came about by accident after she simply cut a large hole at the top of one that had shrunk in the wash).

== Plot ==
Jennifer Beals and Michael Nouri star in Flashdance

Alex Owens is an 18-year-old welder at a steel mill in Pittsburgh, who lives with her male pit bull dog, Grunt, in a converted warehouse. She aspires to become a professional dancer, but has no formal dance training and works as a nightly cabaret performer at Mawby's, a neighborhood bar and grill.

Lacking family, Alex bonds with her coworkers at Mawby's, some of whom also aspire to greater artistic achievements. Jeanie, a waitress, is training to be a figure skater. Her boyfriend, short-order cook Richie Blazek, hopes to become a stand-up comic.

One night, Alex catches the eye of customer Nick Hurley, the owner of the steel mill where she works. After learning that she is one of his employees, he pursues her on the job, though she turns down his advances. Alex is also approached by Johnny C., who wants her to dance at his nearby club, Zanzibar.

After seeking counsel from her mentor, retired ballerina Hanna Long, Alex attempts to apply to the Pittsburgh Conservatory of Dance and Repertory. Intimidated by the scope of the application process, which includes listing all prior dance experience and education, she leaves without applying. Leaving Mawby's one evening, Richie and Alex are assaulted by Johnny C. and his bodyguard, Cecil. Nick intervenes, and after following Alex home, the two begin a relationship.

In a skating competition, Jeanie falls twice during her performance and sits defeated on the ice before being helped away. She is discouraged by her failure and the departure of Richie, who has decided to try his luck in Los Angeles.

Alex gains the courage to apply to the Conservatory. Nick covertly uses his connections with the arts council to get Alex an audition, as she does not have formal dance training.

Upon discovering this, Alex is furious with Nick because she did not get the opportunity based on her own merit, so she decides not to go to the audition. After the sudden death of Hanna and seeing the results of others' failed dreams, Alex becomes despondent over her future. However, following an encouraging conversation with another dancer at Mawby's, Alex has a change of heart and goes through with the audition after all.

At the audition, Alex falters, but begins again and successfully completes a dance number composed of moves that she has studied and practiced, including breakdancing which she has seen on the streets of Pittsburgh. The board responds favorably, and she joyously emerges from the Conservatory to find Nick and Grunt waiting for her with a bouquet of roses.

== Cast ==
- Jennifer Beals as Alexandra "Alex" Owens
- Michael Nouri as Nick Hurley
- Lilia Skala as Hanna Long
- Sunny Johnson as Jeanie Szabo
- Kyle T. Heffner as Richie Blazek
- Lee Ving as Johnny C.
- Ron Karabatsos as Jake Mawby
- Belinda Bauer as Katie Hurley
- Malcolm Danare as Cecil
- Don Brockett as Pete
- Cynthia Rhodes as Tina Tech
- Durga McBroom as Heels
- Phil Bruns as Frank Szabo
- Micole Mercurio as Rosemary Szabo
- Lucy Lee Flippin as Secretary
- Stacey Pickren as Margo
- Bob Harks as Priest
- Liz Sagal as Sunny
- Marine Jahan (uncredited) as Alexandra Owens in dance sequences
- Jumbo Red as Grunt

== Production ==
=== Development ===
In April 1980, Thomas Hedley sold the film idea for development to Casablanca, a Los Angeles production company, for $300,000 and 5% of the net, as reported in The Globe and Mail. Hedley based the concept on the lives of exotic dancers he had met while editor of Toronto Life magazine such as Gina Healey and Maureen Marder. Marder and Healey were paid $2,500 each for their life stories.

Hedley's script was eventually sold to Peter Guber and Jon Peters for PolyGram Pictures, who took the script with them to Paramount Pictures. However, the latter studio had less confidence in the film and placed it into turnaround for two years. Development of the film resumed when Don Simpson, who believed the film could be successful, resigned from his executive post at Paramount Pictures to co-produce the film with Jerry Bruckheimer in their first collaboration. They got Paramount to greenlight the film by hiring Joe Eszterhas to rewrite Hedley's script.

Adrian Lyne was not the first choice as director of Flashdance. David Cronenberg had turned down an offer to direct as he felt he would have destroyed the film, as had Brian De Palma, who instead chose to direct Scarface (1983). At the time, Lyne's background was primarily in directing television commercials, such as his 1970s UK commercials for Brutus Jeans (which may conceivably be seen as anticipating the visuals and style of Flashdance). Lyne agreed to direct because he wanted to establish enough confidence from studios in his directorial skills to get his next film 9½ Weeks (1986) approved. Executives at Paramount were unsure about the film's potential and sold 25% of the rights prior to its release.

=== Casting ===
Three candidates, Jennifer Beals, Demi Moore and Leslie Wing, were the finalists for the role of Alex Owens. Two different stories exist regarding how Beals was chosen. One states that then-Paramount president Michael Eisner asked women secretaries at the studio to select their favorite after viewing screen tests. The other: the film's screenwriter Eszterhas claims that Eisner asked "two hundred of the most macho men on the [Paramount] lot, Teamsters and gaffers and grips ... 'I want to know which of these three young women you'd most want to fuck.'"

The role of Nick Hurley was originally offered to Kiss founding member Gene Simmons, who turned it down because it would conflict with his "demon" image. Kevin Costner, a struggling actor at the time, came very close for the role of Nick, which went to Michael Nouri.

=== Crew ===
Flashdance was the first success of a number of filmmakers who became successful in the 1980s and beyond. The film was the first collaboration between Don Simpson and Jerry Bruckheimer, who went on to produce Beverly Hills Cop (1984) and Top Gun (1986). Eszterhas received his second screen credit for Flashdance, while Lyne went on to direct 9½ Weeks (1986), Fatal Attraction (1987), Indecent Proposal (1993), and Lolita (1997). Lynda Obst, who developed the original story outline, went on to produce Adventures in Babysitting (1987), The Fisher King (1991), and Sleepless in Seattle (1993).

=== Filming ===
The film was shot between October 18, 1982, and December 30, 1982, in Pittsburgh and Los Angeles.

The dimly lit cinematography and montage-style editing are due in part to the fact that most of Jennifer Beals' dancing in the film was performed by a body double. Her main dance double is the French actress Marine Jahan, while the breakdancing that Alex performs in the audition sequence at the end of the film was doubled by the male dancer Crazy Legs. The shot of Alex diving through the air in slow motion during the audition sequence was performed by Sharon Shapiro, who was a professional gymnast. The producers of the film stated they had made no secret of having used a double for Beals, and that Jahan's name did not appear because Paramount Pictures shortened the closing credits. Marine Jahan was told that her involvement was hidden because "they didn't want to break the magic of the film".

Flashdance is often remembered for the sweatshirt with a large neck hole that Beals wore on the poster advertising the film. Beals said that the look of the sweatshirt came about by accident when it shrank in the wash and she cut out a large hole at the top so that she could wear it again.

==== Locations ====
Much of the film was shot in locations around Pittsburgh, Pennsylvania. The opening sequence of scenes with Alex riding her bicycle starts in the Fineview neighborhood. The last scene of the sequence shows Alex riding east over the Smithfield Street Bridge, which is a continuity error. Alex's apartment was located in the South Side neighborhood. When Alex goes to visit Hanna Long (Lilia Skala), she is seen riding one of the Duquesne Incline cable cars. Hanna's apartment is located at 2100 Sidney Street at the southeast corner of South 21st Street.

The fictional Pittsburgh Conservatory of Dance and Repertory was filmed inside the lobby and in front of Carnegie Music Hall, a part of the Carnegie Museum of Art, located near the campuses of Carnegie Mellon University and the University of Pittsburgh in the Oakland neighborhood of Pittsburgh.

The interior of Alex's apartment was filmed in Los Angeles at what was the Feit Electric Building on Los Angeles Street. Additionally, the set for Mawby's was located in downtown Los Angeles. The ice skating rink scene on which Jeanie Szabo (Sunny Johnson) performs was filmed at Culver Ice Rink in Culver City, California.

== Music ==
"Flashdance... What a Feeling" was performed by Irene Cara, who also sang the title song for the similar 1980 film Fame. The music for "Flashdance... What a Feeling" was composed by Giorgio Moroder, and the lyrics were written by Cara and Keith Forsey. The song won an Academy Award for Best Original Song, as well as a Golden Globe Award for Best Original Song and numerous other awards. It also reached number one on the Billboard Hot 100 in May 1983. Despite the song's title, the word "Flashdance" itself is not heard in the lyrics. The song is used in the opening title sequence of the film, and is the music Alex uses in her dance audition routine at the end of the film.

Irene Cara - "Flashdance... What a Feeling"
listen to a clip from the song.

Michael Sembello - "Maniac"
listen to a clip from the track.

Another song used in the film, "Maniac", was also nominated for an Academy Award. It was written by Michael Sembello and Dennis Matkosky. A popular urban legend holds that the song was originally written for the 1980 horror film Maniac, and that lyrics about a killer on the loose were rewritten so the song could be used in Flashdance. The legend is discredited in the special features of the film's DVD release, which reveal that the song was written for the film, although only two complete lyrics ("Just a steel town girl on a Saturday night" and "She's a maniac") were available when filming commenced. Like the title song, it reached number one on the Billboard Hot 100 in September 1983.

Other songs in the film include "Lady, Lady, Lady", performed by Joe Esposito, "Imagination" performed by Laura Branigan, and "I'll Be Here Where the Heart Is", performed by Kim Carnes.

The soundtrack album of Flashdance sold 700,000 copies during its first two weeks on sale and has gone on to sell over six million copies in the U.S. alone. In 1984, the album won the Grammy Award for Best Album of Original Score Written for a Motion Picture or a Television Special at the 26th Annual Grammy Awards.

== Release ==
Flashdance was released in the United States on April 15, 1983. On April 14, 1983, the night before the general release of the film, a special benefit premiere of Flashdance was shown at the Warner Theater in Pittsburgh. It was the last film at the theater. Several months later it was torn down to make way for the Warner Centre, a retail and office complex.

=== Home media ===
Flashdance has been issued originally on VHS and LaserDisc with a Paramount Home Entertainment DVD release on October 8, 2002, and a Special Collector's Edition DVD in 2010. It was first released on Blu-ray Disc on August 13, 2013, by Warner Bros. with seven special features including a 15-minute featurette, "The History of Flashdance", a 9-minute featurette, "The Look of Flashdance", "Flashdance: The Choreography" and a teaser and theatrical trailers. The film was re-released on Blu-ray in the U.S. on May 19, 2020, by Paramount Presents with a new 4K remaster and packaging. It includes a new Filmmakers Focus interview with the director but excludes a few special features from the previous Blu-ray release.

== Reception ==
=== Critical response ===
The film received negative reviews from critics. On Rotten Tomatoes the film has an approval rating of 37% based on 49 reviews, with an average rating of 4.80/10. The site's consensus is: "All style and very little substance, Flashdance boasts eye-catching dance sequences—and benefits from an appealing performance from Jennifer Beals—but its narrative is flat-footed". Metacritic, which uses a weighted average, assigned the film a score of 39 out of 100, based on 11 critics, indicating "generally unfavorable" reviews.

Roger Ebert placed it on his list of most hated films, and in giving the film 1.5 out of 4 stars in his review, stated: "Jennifer Beals shouldn't feel bad. She is a natural talent, she is fresh and engaging here, and only needs to find an agent with a natural talent for turning down scripts". In his review for the Chicago Sun-Times, Ebert said "If Flashdance had spent just a little more effort getting to know the heroine of its story, and a little less time trying to rip off Saturday Night Fever, it might have been a much better film." Variety compared the film to a series of music videos, "Watching Flashdance is pretty much like looking at MTV for 96 minutes. Virtually plotless, exceedingly thin on characterization and sociologically laughable, pic at least lives up to its title by offering an anthology of extraordinarily flashy dance numbers." Janet Maslin of The New York Times wrote: "With a score by Giorgio Moroder, and with ingenious costumes that are utterly au courant, Flashdance contains such dynamic dance scenes that it's a pity there's a story here to bog them down."

In a 1984 essay for the journal Jump Cut, critic Kathryn Kalinak questioned the characterization of Alex: "How could an 18 year-old [sic] woman land a skilled labor job as a welder in the unionized steel industry of an economically depressed union town? ... Not only are any other women missing in the factory, so are employees, male or female, under 30."

=== Accolades ===
Award	Category	Nominee(s)	Result	Ref.
Academy Awards	Best Cinematography	Donald Peterman	Nominated	
Academy Awards	Best Film Editing	Bud S. Smith and Walt Mulconery	Nominated	
Academy Awards	Best Original Song	"Flashdance... What a Feeling"; Music by Giorgio Moroder; Lyrics by Keith Forsey and Irene Cara	Won	
Academy Awards	Best Original Song	"Maniac"; Music and Lyrics by Michael Sembello and Dennis Matkosky	Nominated	
American Cinema Editors Awards	Best Edited Feature Film	Bud S. Smith and Walt Mulconery	Nominated	
Blue Ribbon Awards	Best Foreign Film	Adrian Lyne	Won	
British Academy Film Awards	Best Editing	Bud S. Smith and Walt Mulconery	Won	
British Academy Film Awards	Best Score for a Film	Giorgio Moroder	Nominated	
British Academy Film Awards	Best Original Song Written for a Film	"Flashdance... What a Feeling"; Music by Giorgio Moroder; Lyrics by Keith Forsey and Irene Cara	Nominated	
British Academy Film Awards	Best Sound	Don Digirolamo, Robert Glass, Robert Knudson, and James E. Webb	Nominated	
Golden Globe Awards	Best Motion Picture – Musical or Comedy		Nominated	
Golden Globe Awards	Best Actress in a Motion Picture – Musical or Comedy	Jennifer Beals	Nominated	
Golden Globe Awards	Best Original Score – Motion Picture	Giorgio Moroder	Won	
Golden Globe Awards	Best Original Song – Motion Picture	"Flashdance... What a Feeling"; Music by Giorgio Moroder; Lyrics by Keith Forsey and Irene Cara	Won	
Golden Globe Awards	Best Original Song – Motion Picture	"Maniac"; Music and Lyrics by Michael Sembello and Dennis Matkosky	Nominated	
Golden Raspberry Awards	Worst Screenplay	Screenplay by Tom Hedley and Joe Eszterhas; Story by Tom Hedley	Nominated	
Grammy Awards	Album of the Year	Flashdance: Original Soundtrack from the Motion Picture; Various Artists and Giorgio Moroder	Nominated	
Grammy Awards	Record of the Year	"Flashdance... What a Feeling" – Irene Cara and Giorgio Moroder	Nominated	
Grammy Awards	Record of the Year	"Maniac" – Phil Ramone and Michael Sembello	Nominated	
Grammy Awards	Song of the Year	"Maniac" – Dennis Matkosky and Michael Sembello	Nominated	
Grammy Awards	Best Pop Vocal Performance, Male	"Maniac" – Michael Sembello	Nominated	
Grammy Awards	Best Pop Vocal Performance, Female	"Flashdance... What a Feeling" – Irene Cara	Won	
Grammy Awards	Best Pop Instrumental Performance	"Love Theme from Flashdance" – Helen St. John	Nominated	
Grammy Awards	Best Instrumental Composition	"Love Theme from Flashdance" – Giorgio Moroder	Won	
Grammy Awards	Best Album of Original Score Written for a Motion Picture or a Television Special	Flashdance: Original Soundtrack from the Motion Picture; Michael Boddicker, Irene Cara, Kim Carnes, Doug Cotler, Keith Forsey, Richard Gilbert, Jerry Hey, Duane Hitchings, Craig Krampf, Ronald Magness, Dennis Matkosky, Giorgio Moroder, Phil Ramone, Michael Sembello and Shandi Sinnamon	Won	
Hochi Film Awards	Best International Picture	Adrian Lyne	Won	
Japan Academy Prize	Outstanding Foreign Language Film		Nominated	
NAACP Image Awards	Outstanding Actress in a Motion Picture	Jennifer Beals	Won	
National Music Publishers' Association	Best Song in a Movie	Irene Cara	Won	
People's Choice Awards	Favorite Theme/Song from a Motion Picture	"Flashdance... What a Feeling"	Won	
Satellite Awards	Best DVD Extras		Nominated	

The film is recognized by American Film Institute in these lists:

- 2004: AFI's 100 Years...100 Songs:
  - "Flashdance... What a Feeling" – #55

== Legacy ==
There were discussions about a sequel, but the film was never made. Beals turned down an offer to appear in a sequel, saying: "I've never been drawn to something by virtue of how rich or famous it will make me. I turned down so much money, and my agents were just losing their minds."

In March 2001, a Broadway musical version was proposed with new songs by Giorgio Moroder, but failed to materialize. In July 2008, a stage musical adaptation Flashdance The Musical premiered at the Theatre Royal in Plymouth, England. The book is co-written by Tom Hedley, who created the story outline for the original film, and the choreography is by Arlene Phillips.

In October 2020, Paramount announced plans to reboot the film as a TV series for Paramount+.

Jennifer Beals' performance started her reputation as a lesbian icon.

=== Connection to MTV ===
Flashdance is not a musical in the traditional sense as none of the characters sing or dance, but rather the songs are presented in the style of self-contained music videos. Its success has been attributed in part to the 1981 launch of the cable channel MTV (Music Television) since it was the first feature film to exploit the new popularity of music videos effectively. By excerpting segments of the film and running them as music videos on MTV, the studio benefited from extensive free promotion, establishing the new medium as an important marketing tool for films. In the mid-1980s, it became common to release a music video to promote a major motion picture, even if the film was not especially suited for one.

== Legal action ==
=== Suit against the filmmakers ===
Flashdance was inspired by the real-life story of Maureen Marder, a construction worker by day and dancer by night at Gimlets, a Toronto strip club. Like Alex Owens in the film, she aspired to enroll in a prestigious dance school. Tom Hedley wrote the original story outline for Flashdance, and on December 6, 1982, Marder signed a release document giving Paramount Pictures the right to portray her life story on screen, for which she was given a one-off payment of $2,300. Flashdance is estimated to have grossed more than $200 million worldwide. In June 2006, the U.S. Court of Appeals for the Ninth Circuit in San Francisco affirmed a lower court's ruling that Marder gave up her rights to the film when she signed the release document in 1982. The panel of three judges stated in its ruling: "Though in hindsight the agreement appears to be unfair to Marder—she only received $2,300 in exchange for a release of all claims relating to a movie that grossed over $150 million—there is simply no evidence that her consent was obtained by fraud, deception, misrepresentation, duress or undue influence." The court also noted that Marder's attorney had been present when she signed the document.

=== Suit against Jennifer Lopez and filmmakers over music video ===
In 2003, following the use of dance routines from the film by Jennifer Lopez in her music video "I'm Glad" (directed by David LaChapelle), Marder sued Lopez, Sony Corporation (the makers of the music video) and Paramount in an attempt to gain a copyright interest in the film. Although Lopez argued that her video for "I'm Glad" was intended as a tribute to Flashdance, Sony settled a copyright infringement lawsuit out of court for the use of dance routines and other story material from the film in the video.

== See also ==
- It's Flashbeagle, Charlie Brown
- List of American films of 1983
- Duquesne Brewery Clock
- Dance, Girl, Dance
