= Innocents of Paris =

1929 film

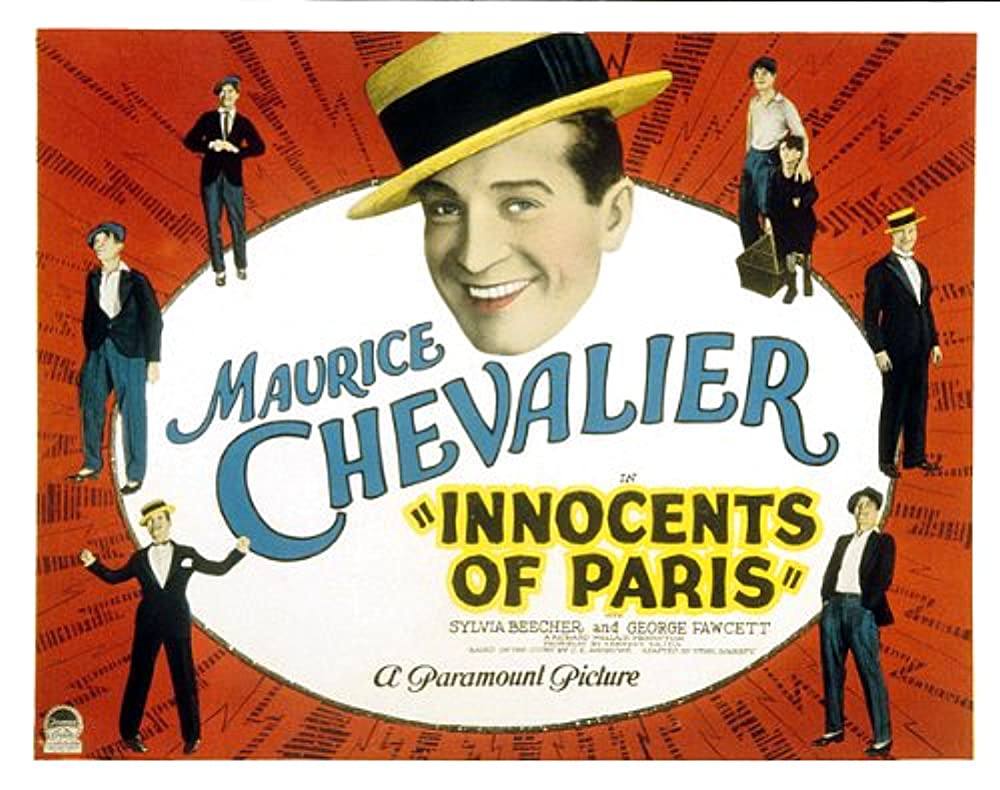
- Directed by: Richard Wallace
- Written by: C.E. Andrews (play "Flea Market"; also novelisation); Ethel Doherty (screenplay); Ernest Vajda (screenplay)
- Produced by: Jesse L. Lasky
- Starring: Maurice Chevalier; Sylvia Beecher; Russell Simpson
- Cinematography: Charles Lang
- Edited by: George M. Arthur
- Music by: John Leipold; Richard A. Whiting; Leo Robin
- Production company: Paramount Pictures
- Distributed by: Paramount Pictures
- Release date: May 25, 1929
- Running time: 78 minutes
- Country: United States
- Language: English

Innocents of Paris is a 1929 black and white American musical film. Directed by Richard Wallace and based on the play Flea Market, the film was the first musical production by Paramount Pictures. Although the screenplay was regarded as mediocre, the critics were impressed with the newly arrived Chevalier, for whom they predicted much success. At the preview in Los Angeles, established film-actor Adolphe Menjou, son of French immigrant parents, congratulated Chevalier in person.

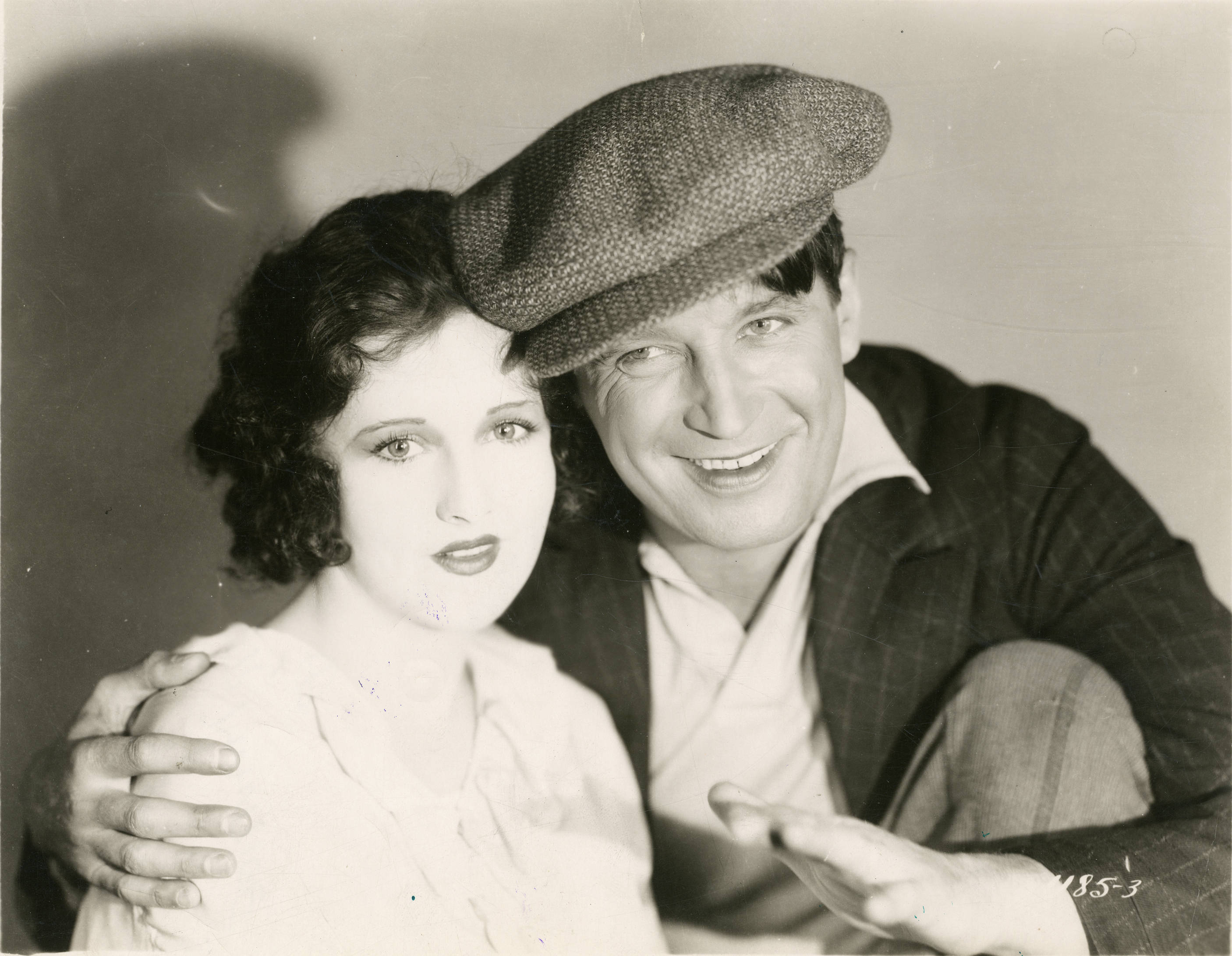
Scene from Innocents of Paris

The film used the somewhat new technology of sound with the Western Electric sound system. Dubbing was not a common practice, but the film makers attempted it here over stock footage of Paris. An orchestra played "Louise" under one microphone while several actors spoke street observations under another, like "What pretty flowers!", and a group of three men whistled bird calls into a third microphone. Several takes were required to get the mixing right, but what resulted was an early example of sound dubbing.

A novelisation of the film, written by C.E. Andrews, was published by The Readers Library to coincide with the film's release and included 8 pages of stills (it was titled The Innocents of Paris).

== Cast ==
- Maurice Chevalier as Maurice Marney
- Sylvia Beecher as Louise Leval
- Russell Simpson as Emile Leval
- George Fawcett as Monsieur Marny
- Mrs. George Fawcett (Percy Haswell) as Madame Marny
- John Miljan as Monsieur Renard
- Margaret Livingston as Madame Renard
- Jack Luden as Jules
- Johnnie Morris as Musician

== Soundtrack ==
- "It's A Habit Of Mine"

Lyrics by Leo Robin
Music by Richard A. Whiting
Copyright 1929 by Famous Music Corp.

- "Wait 'Til You See Ma Cherie"

Lyrics by Leo Robin
Music by Richard A. Whiting
Copyright 1929 by Famous Music Corp.

- "On Top Of The World, Alone"

Lyrics by Leo Robin
Music by Richard A. Whiting
Copyright 1929 by Famous Music Corp.

- "Louise"

Lyrics by Leo Robin
Music by Richard A. Whiting
Sung by Maurice Chevalier
Copyright 1929 by Famous Music Corp.
