= Bud S. Smith =

American film editor (1935–2024)

- Photo of Bud S. Smith
- Born: December 6, 1935; Tulsa, Oklahoma, U.S.
- Died: June 23, 2024 (aged 88); Studio City, California, U.S.
- Occupations: Film editor; film director
- Years active: 1963–2013
- Spouse: Lucy Coldsnow
- Awards: BAFTA − Best Editing (1984); American Cinema Editors Career Achievement Award (2008)

Bud S. Smith (December 6, 1935 – June 23, 2024) was an American film editor, producer, and director. He shared the 1984 BAFTA Award for Best Editing for Flashdance and also shared the 2008 American Cinema Editors Career Achievement Award. He was a regular collaborator of director William Friedkin, serving as editor on six of his films. He was nominated for Academy Awards for Flashdance (1983) and The Exorcist (1973).

Smith was married to dialogue editor Lucy Coldsnow-Smith. The couple were longtime residents of the Hollywood Hills before selling their house there in 2013. Diagnosed with throat cancer in 2012, Smith died from respiratory failure at his home in Studio City, Los Angeles, on June 23, 2024, at the age of 88.

At the 97th Academy Awards, his name was mentioned in the In Memoriam section.

== Filmography ==
Year	Film	Film Editor	Producer	Director	Other	Notes
1969	Putney Swope	Yes				
1970	Pound	Yes				
1972	Greaser's Palace	Yes				
1973	Deadhead Miles	Yes				with Danford B. Greene
1973	The Exorcist	Yes				with Evan A. Lottman & Norman Gay; Nominated − Academy Award for Best Film Editing
1973	Sticks and Bones	Yes				Television film
1974	Rhinoceros	Yes				
1977	Sorcerer	Yes	Yes			Also associate producer & second unit director with Robert K. Lambert
1978	The Brink's Job	Yes				
1978	A Death in Canaan	Yes				
1980	Cruising	Yes				
1980	Falling in Love Again	Yes				with Jacqueline Cambas & Doug Jackson
1981	Zoot Suit	Yes				with Jacqueline Cambas
1982	Cat People	Yes			Yes	Also second unit director with Jacqueline Cambas
1982	Personal Best	Yes				with Jacqueline Cambas, Doug Jackson, Jere Huggins, Ned Humphreys & Walt Mulconery
1983	Flashdance	Yes				with Walt Mulconery; BAFTA Award for Best Editing; Nominated − Academy Award for Best Film Editing
1983	Deal of the Century	Yes				with Jere Huggins & Ned Humphreys
1984	The Karate Kid	Yes	Yes			Also associate producer with Walt Mulconery & John G. Avildsen
1985	To Live and Die in L.A.	Yes	Yes		Yes	Also co-producer & second unit director with M. Scott Smith
1986	Poltergeist II: The Other Side	Yes				with Thom Noble & M. Scott Smith
1986	C.A.T. Squad	Yes	Yes			Television film Also co-producer & second unit director
1987	Some Kind of Wonderful	Yes				with M. Scott Smith
1988	Johnny Be Good			Yes		
1989	Sing	Yes				with Jere Huggins & M. Scott Smith
1989	Listen to Me	Yes				with Anne V. Coates
1989	Gross Anatomy	Yes				with M. Scott Smith
1990	Darkman	Yes				with David Stiven
1992	Stop! Or My Mom Will Shoot				2nd unit	
1999	Virus		Co-producer		2nd Unit	
2000	The Replacements	Yes				with Seth Flaum
2000	Christina's House				Yes	As post-production advisor
2003	The Young Black Stallion	Yes				with Terry Blythe
2004	Ladder 49	Yes				with M. Scott Smith
2005	The Game of Their Lives	Yes				with Ian Crafford, Lee Grubin, Jeff Williams & M. Scott Smith
2006	Driftwood		Yes		Yes	Also second unit director
2008	Lonely Street		Co-producer			
2009	G-Force				Yes	
2009	The Mighty Macs		Executive			
2013	Alone yet Not Alone		Executive			

== Awards and nominations ==
=== Academy Awards ===
- 1974 Academy Award for Best Film Editing: The Exorcist − with Evan A. Lottman & Norman Gay (nominated)
- 1984 Academy Award for Best Film Editing: Flashdance − with Walt Mulconery (nominated)

=== American Cinema Editors Awards ===
- 1984: American Cinema Editors Award for Best Edited Feature Film – Dramatic: Flashdance − with Walt Mulconery (nominated)
- 2008: American Cinema Editors Career Achievement Award (won)

=== British Academy of Film and Television Awards ===
- 1984 BAFTA Award for Best Editing: Flashdance − with Walt Mulconery (won)
