= Walt Mulconery =

American film editor (1932–2001)

- Born: February 17, 1932; Burbank, California, U.S.
- Died: December 6, 2001 (aged 69); Los Angeles, California, U.S.
- Occupation: Film editor
- Years active: 1963–1995

Walt Mulconery (February 17, 1932 – December 6, 2001) was an American film editor who was most known for his work on films such as The Karate Kid, Flashdance and the English version of The Adventures of Milo and Otis.

He was nominated in the category of Best Film Editing at the 56th Academy Awards along with Bud S. Smith for their work on the film Flashdance.

He also won the BAFTA award for his work on Flashdance.
