= Doug Cotler =

American singer-songwriter

Douglas Norman Cotler (born October 2, 1949) is a Grammy award-winning singer-songwriter and composer based in Los Angeles, California.

Cotler tours the United States sharing his music with Jewish communities.

Cotler's composed the symphony, The Golem, which was performed by Seattle Philharmonic Orchestra. He performs country, pop and rock music with artists such as John Denver, Jerry Jeff Walker and Mason Williams. He recorded five original Jewish music albums. Cotler's 1984 Grammy was awarded for writing "Manhunt", a song featured in the soundtrack and movie, Flashdance. Cotler is the musical producer of the Reform Movement's National Biennial Conventions.

With his father, a Cantor, providing training from age nine, Cotler's professional career began at 14, singing in Southern California synagogues and Jewish Community Centers. When Doug's father died, he assumed his father's position as Cantor at a large reform congregation in the San Francisco Bay Area.

His album Listen contains the song, "Standing on the Shoulders". This song is used as a theme for conventions, films and religious services. Cotler's other albums include It's So Amazing!, Whispers in the Wind and Down Home. His cover album Echoes contains Jewish-American popular classics. His newest albums are A Rose in December, which reflects songs of healing and peace, a live concert recording, Everyone's Invited – Doug Cotler LIVE! and Funny Jewish Songs, a collection of Jewish musical humor.

Doug is the Cantorial Soloist at Congregation Or Ami, in Calabasas, California.

== Personal life ==
A native Californian and resident of Woodland Hills, California, Doug and his wife Gail, have two sons, Kyle and Noah.

== Discography ==
Partial; see discography for the list on his website.

- Listen
- It's So Amazing! – Songs for Jewish Children
- Whispers in the Wind
- Echoes
- Funny Jewish Songs
- Everyone's Invited – Doug Cotler Live
- My 'Magination – Children's Songs featuring Pobba
- Rose in December

== Gallery ==
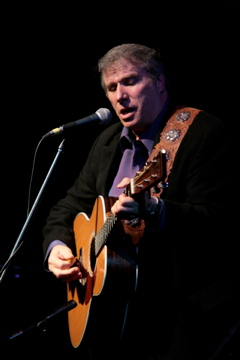

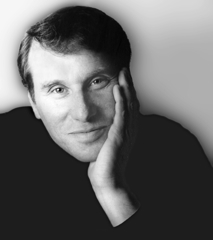

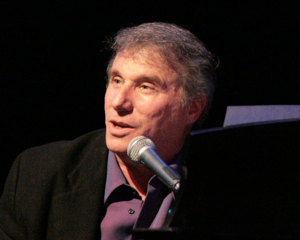
