= Gus Levene =

- Birth name: Gershun Levene
- Born: July 11, 1911; Dallas, Texas, US
- Died: February 9, 1979 (aged 67); Los Angeles, California, US
- Occupation(s): Arranger, composer, orchestrator, guitarist
- Instrument(s): Guitar, violin, viola
- Years active: 1932–1979

Gus Levene, born Gershun Levene (July 11, 1911 – February 9, 1979), was an American arranger, composer, orchestrator and guitarist. In the mid-1940s, he was one of the top network radio arrangers. Levene is best remembered for his work as an arranger for Dean Martin and orchestration for numerous Hollywood film productions, including the 1956 hit film The King and I.

== Early life and education ==
Gershun Levene was born into a family of Jewish merchants in Dallas, Texas. He was interested in music from an early age, and learned to play guitar, violin and viola. He attended Southern Methodist University for two years, majoring in music.

His first cousin, Milton Leventhal, became a surgeon in Dallas.

== Career ==
Levene began his career as the chief arranger for the pit orchestra at the Palace Theater in Dallas, and composed music for string quartets in the city. He also performed with the WFAA radio orchestra. On September 4, 1932, his composition "Ballet Suite Exodus", which he had written at the age of 18, was performed by the Dallas Symphony Orchestra.

In 1933 he and his new wife Julia moved to New York City, where he continued to study music while working as an arranger and guitarist for Andre Kostelanetz and Ray Bloch. He was hired by CBS Radio in the late 1930s. By the mid 1940s, Levene was named as one of the 20 top network radio arrangers by Billboard.

He later moved to Hollywood, where he was employed as an arranger for most of the major studios, mostly uncredited work for films such as The Eddie Cantor Story (1953), The King and I (1956), Carousel (1956), The Big Land (1957), Marjorie Morningstar (1958), The Music Man (1962), and At Long Last Love (1975). He worked extensively with Dean Martin, and headed the backing orchestra on Martin's 1959 Christmas album A Winter Romance. Levene and his orchestra also backed Frank Sinatra when he recorded "Have Yourself a Merry Little Christmas" for a 1963 Reprise various artists seasonal compilation album of the same name, and the recording was also used on the soundtrack of The Victors, a 1963 war film. Although only a snippet of the song actually aired in the film, Sinatra released the whole recording as a Christmas single.

Arranger George Siravo recalled a conversation he had with Levene about Sinatra's approach to music:

"Gus Levene once asked me, 'What do you find the most difficult thing to put on the score sheet?' Before I came up with the answer, he said, 'A well-placed rest – where nobody plays.' When you write an arrangement for Frank, he doesn't know where you're gonna put the punctuations in the music. When you do a date, sometimes the singer will say, 'Hey, that figure is in my way ... you gotta take it out, it's in my way.' But Frank would never say that. He would always use what the arranger put in there to his benefit. He'd detour: he would postpone singing in there [at that spot], he would back off. He'd say, 'F— it. I won't sing there – I'll wait till the riff passes, then I'll do it.' When he sang, he reminded me of what it's like when you go out in the rain, and it's just started, and there are only a few drops and you can duck between the drops to keep dry. To me, Frank was singing between the drops".

== Death ==
Levene died in 1979.
