= Warner Centre =

Building in Pittsburgh, Pennsylvania, United States

- Grand Theatre, Warner Theatre
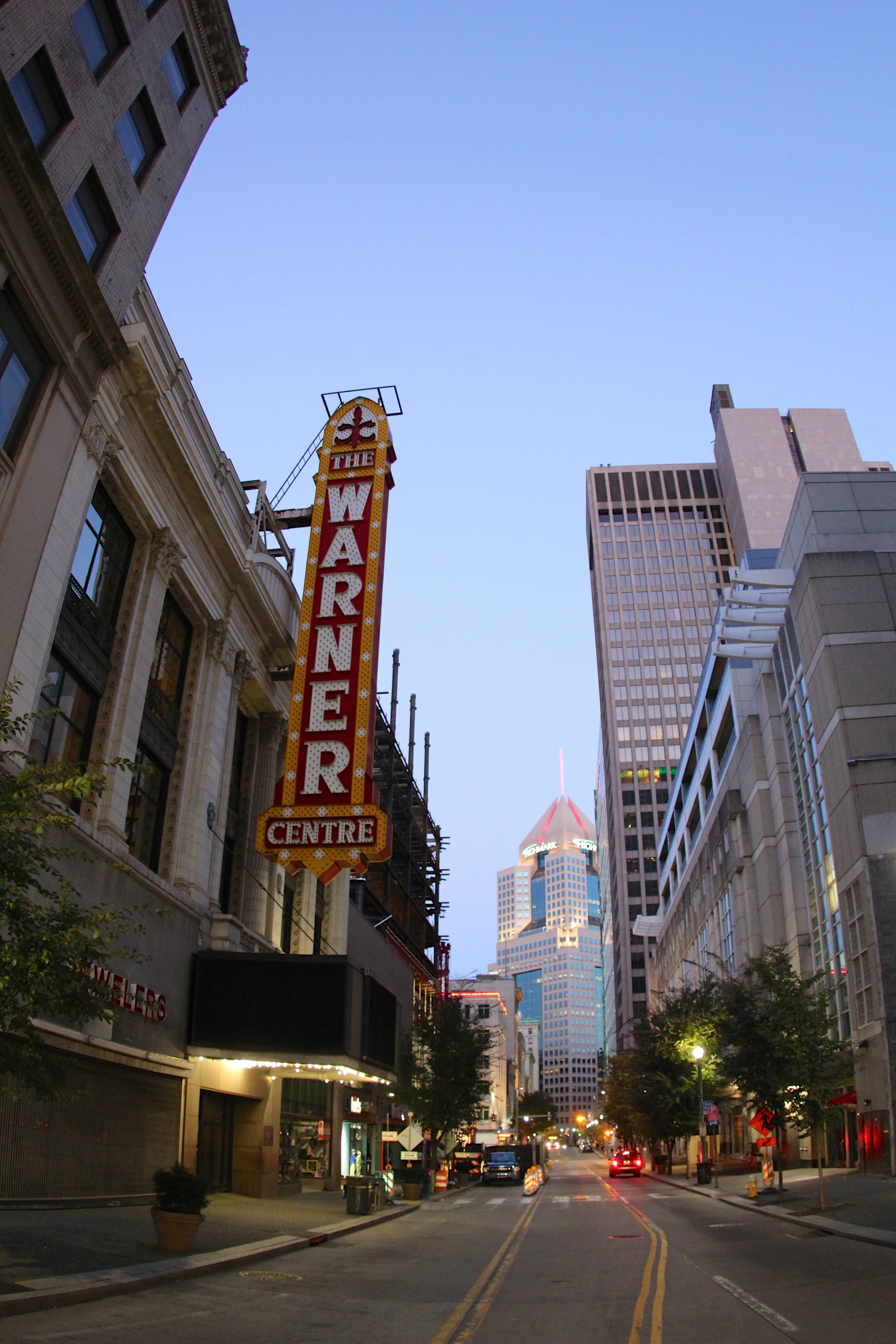
- A view of the Warner Centre on Fifth Avenue
- Interactive map of Warner Centre
- Address: 332 Fifth Avenue; Pittsburgh, Pennsylvania; United States
- Coordinates: 40.440136°N 79.999470°W
- Type: Movie Theater
- Current use: Welfare Office

Construction
- Opened: March 7, 1918
- Closed: April 14, 1983
- Years active: 1918 - 1983
- Architect: C. Howard Crane

The Warner Centre is a former theater and concert hall located at 332 Fifth Avenue in Downtown Pittsburgh. It opened as the Grand Theatre on March 7, 1918, with Douglas Fairbanks in Headin' South and Winifred Westover in Her Husband’s Wife. The theater was renamed Warner Theatre on January 2, 1930. In 1983 the theater was closed, the auditorium was demolished, and a two-story shopping center named Warner Center was built on the site.

It was turned into an indoor shopping mall. A food court there closed in 2003.

== See also ==
- List of concert halls
- Theatre in Pittsburgh
