= Louise (Maurice Chevalier song) =

Single by Maurice Chevalier
- B-side: "On Top of the World, Alone"
- Released: 1929
- Label: His Master's Voice
- Songwriters: Leo Robin, Richard A. Whiting

"Louise" is a song written by Leo Robin and Richard A. Whiting for the 1929 film Innocents of Paris, where it was performed by Maurice Chevalier. The song was Chevalier's first hit in the United States, and was among the best selling records for 10 weeks in the summer of 1929. Chevalier recorded the song again in 1946 with Henri René's Orchestra for RCA Victor.

== Other recordings ==
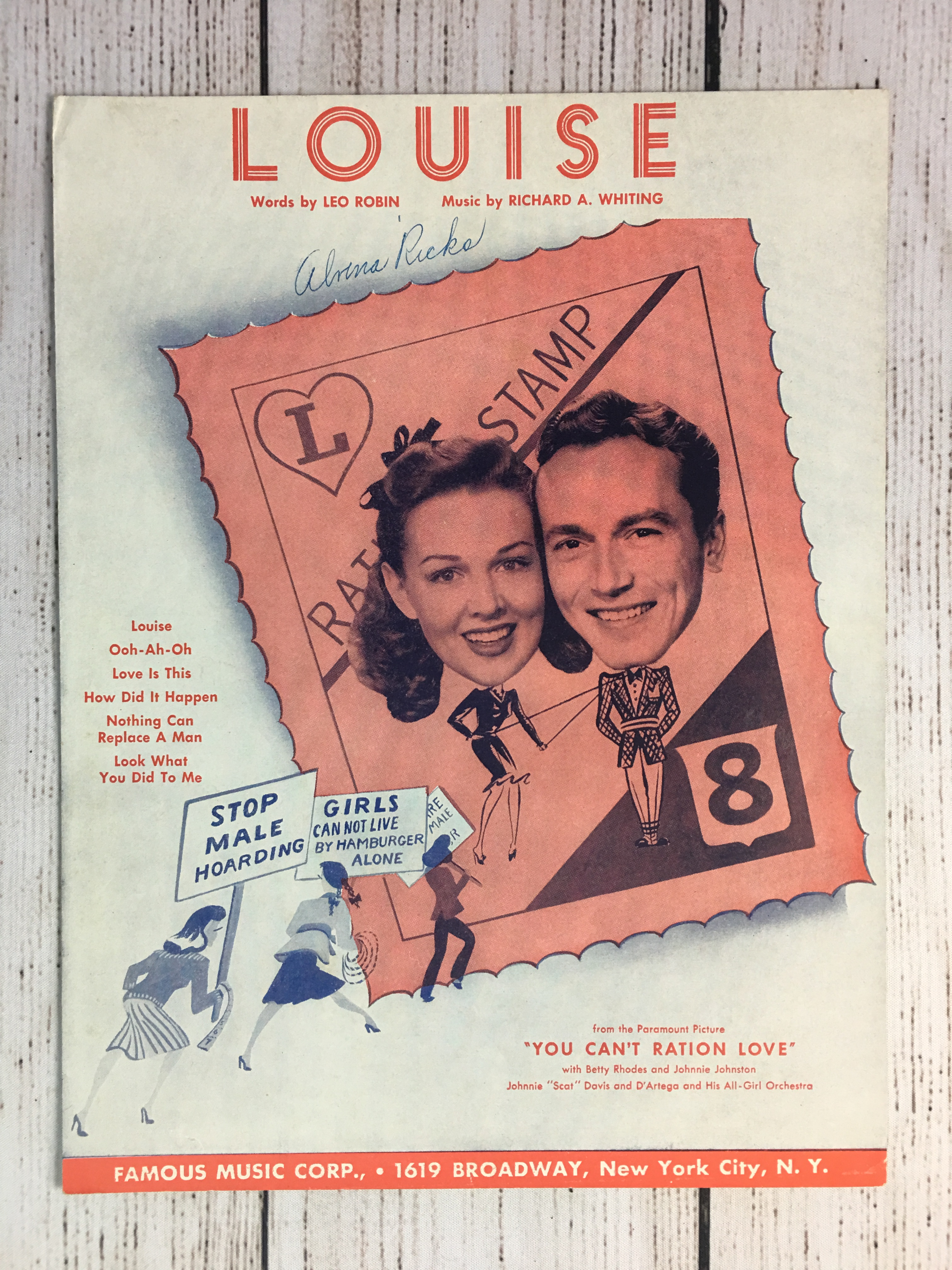
1944 "Louise" Famous Music Corp. Sheet Music

- The same year of Chevalier's recording, Bing Crosby also recorded the song. Crosby's version was recorded on March 15, 1929, with Paul Whiteman and his orchestra and was a hit in that summer. Crosby also recorded a comedy version with The Rhythm Boys on April 10, 1929.
- Ben Pollack & His Central Park Orchestra, vocal Charles Roberts, (recorded March 1, 1929, for Victor Records – catalog No. 21941A).
- Frankie Trumbauer (recorded April 17, 1929, for Okeh Records, catalog No. 41231).
- Benny Goodman (recorded December 12, 1938, for Victor Records, catalog No. 26125).
- Dean Martin recorded the song and his version was included in his 1953 album Dean Martin Sings.
- Pierre Lalonde's cover of "Louise" hit No. 1 on the Québec charts in 1964.

== Film, TV, and stage appearances ==
- 1929 - Innocents of Paris – sung by Maurice Chevalier
- 1944 - You Can't Ration Love – sung by Betty Rhodes and Johnnie Johnston
- 1945 - The Lost Weekend – played on piano and sung by Harry Barris at Harry and Joe's.
- 1951 - The Stooge
- 1953 - Desi Arnaz, Lucille Ball, William Frawley, and Vivian Vance each sang a portion of the song, in a manner imitating Chevalier, on the I Love Lucy episode, "The French Revue".
- 1954 - The Country Girl
- 1963 - A New Kind of Love
- 1973 - Robert Reed sang a portion of the song on an episode of The Brady Bunch, "A Room at the Top".
- 1974 - Harry and Tonto – sung by Art Carney.
- 1975 - Demond Wilson and Whitman Mayo sang a portion of the song on an episode of Sanford and Son, "The Older Woman"."
- 1979 - A Day in Hollywood / A Night in the Ukraine – sung in a Richard A. Whiting Medley
- 1988 - 'Allo 'Allo! – sung by Arthur Bostrom.
- 1990 - The Simpsons – a portion sung by Bart Simpson in The Crepes of Wrath.
