= Calder Willingham =

American writer

- Born: Calder Baynard Willingham Jr. December 23, 1922; Atlanta, Georgia, United States
- Died: February 19, 1995 (aged 72); Laconia, New Hampshire, United States
- Occupations: Writer; novelist; screenwriter
- Writing career
- Language: English
- Genres: Fiction, screenwriting, short story
- Notable works: Eternal Fire; The Graduate (screenplay); Rambling Rose

Calder Baynard Willingham Jr. (December 23, 1922 – February 19, 1995) was an American novelist and screenwriter.

Before the age of 30, after three novels and a collection of short stories, The New Yorker was describing Willingham as having “fathered modern black comedy,” his signature a dry, straight-faced humor, made funnier by its concealed comic intent. His work matured over six more novels, including Eternal Fire (1963), which Newsweek wrote “deserves a place among the dozen or so novels that must be mentioned if one is to speak of greatness in American fiction.” He had a significant career in cinema too, with screenplays including Paths of Glory (1957), One-Eyed Jacks (1960), The Graduate (1967) and Little Big Man (1970).

== Life and career ==
Willingham was born in Atlanta, Georgia, the son of Eleanor Churchill (Willcox) and Calder Baynard Willingham, a hotel manager. After dropping out of The Citadel, then working for the Office of War Information in Washington, D.C., Willingham moved to New York City where he wrote for 10 years, setting three novels there. During the late 1940s and early 1950s, Willingham was considered at the forefront of the gritty, realistic new breed of postwar novelists: Norman Mailer, James Jones, Truman Capote, Gore Vidal, and others, many of whom comprised the Greenwich Village literary scene at the time.

Willingham's career began in controversy with End as a Man (1947), an indictment of the macho culture of military academies, introducing his first iconic character, sadistic Jocko de Paris. The story included graphic hazing, sex, and suggested homosexuality. The New York Society for the Suppression of Vice filed obscenity charges against its publisher Vanguard Press. The charges ultimately were dropped, but not before a trial that made the book a cause célèbre in which famous writers were rallying to its defense. Reviews singled out its savage humor and realistic dialogue.

Willingham adapted the book into a play at New York's Actors Studio, where it was an off-Broadway success featuring a young James Dean and introducing actor George Peppard. Sam Spiegel, one of Hollywood's top producers, commissioned Willingham to adapt the novel to film, his first, retitled The Strange One (1957) for Columbia Pictures, which advertised it as "the first picture filmed entirely by a cast and technicians from the Actors Studio".

Willingham followed it with the first in a semi-autobiographical trilogy of novels about an aspiring writer Dick Davenport. Geraldine Bradshaw (1950) was set in a Chicago hotel during World War II where Dick works as a bellboy (as Willingham had), lusting after a new elevator girl. Its sexual explicitness divided critics, who felt its subject was beneath the writer's gifts, but it sold well and has maintained a cult following among writers. William Styron reported visiting William Faulkner and noticing it prominently placed on his desk, and it appears on various published lists of “lost classics.” The original version was 415 pages long, but a 1964 edition, considerably shorter, is definitive, including a foreword from Willingham who explained how the pressure of End as a Man’s success led him to the grandiose idea of filling the follow-up book with obscure references to the next two in the trilogy. "Success is always dangerous, and early success is deadly," he said in a 1953 interview. "What I went through writing my second book shouldn't happen to a dog."

Next came Reach to the Stars (1951), a second Dick Davenport novel, with Dick as a bell-boy in Los Angeles, making observations and sexual hay on the fringe of the upscale Hollywood scene. In 1951, Willingham also published Gates of Hell (1951), his lone book of short stories, mostly comic. The book was revered in literary circles, and in 1970, Tom Wolfe called it "the most undeservedly neglected book since World War II" referring to Willingham as "the great comic genius of American fiction."

Natural Child (1952), Willingham's first New York novel, was a portrait of two young men and two young women living the bohemian lifestyle of the time. The sophisticated plotting combined with Willingham's ear for realistic dialogue in one of the lesser-known gems in his collection. To Eat a Peach (1955) chronicled life and lust among adults running a summer camp. Confusion about how to place writing considered both literary and prurient resulted in the release of two different paperback versions, one with the original title and another with racy cover art re-titled The Girl in the Dogwood Cabin. The seeming ease with which it was written bolstered rumors the novel had been written start-to-finish in three weeks, which turned out to be true.

Busy with film work, it was eight years before Willingham's next novel, his most ambitious, Eternal Fire (1963), an epic set in Glenville, Georgia, a fictional stand-in for his home town of Rome, Georgia. It chronicles the proposed marriage of a young heir to a virtuous schoolteacher, plagued by inexplicable suicidal thoughts. It got the best reviews of Willingham's career, sold well, and firmly established him as one of the major authors of his day. Shelby Foote said the novel convinced him that Willingham was about “the only living American writer qualified to hold Dostoevsky’s coat in a street fight.”

Willingham's next novel appeared six years later, another epic, Providence Island (1969), in which a male television executive is shipwrecked with a repressed, married woman and a plain, shy, androgynous one. The book was not as well reviewed as its predecessor but became a best-seller in paperback. Twentieth Century Fox paid a near-record amount to buy the rights for husband and wife Paul Newman and Joanne Woodward but never made the movie.

The novels came slower as Willingham became a more prolific screenwriter. After the film version of End as a Man, producer Spiegel asked Willingham to work on The Bridge on the River Kwai (1957) for director David Lean. Willingham traveled to Ceylon, where he met with Lean, who disliked Willingham's writing, and Willingham soon returned to the United States.

Stanley Kubrick first hired Willingham to adapt Stefan Zweig’s novel The Burning Secret, but the project fell through and Kubrick eventually hired Willingham to work on the script of Paths of Glory (1957), of which Jim Thompson had written earlier drafts. The specific contributions by Kubrick, Thompson, and Willingham to the final script were disputed, and the matter went to arbitration with the Writers' Guild. Willingham continued working with Kirk Douglas, the star of Paths of Glory, receiving screen credit for The Vikings (1958), a box-office hit starring Douglas, Tony Curtis and Janet Leigh. Soon after, Kubrick replaced Anthony Mann as director during filming of Spartacus (1960), which Douglas was starring in and producing, and Willingham joined the production to work on the screenplay and battle sequences.

Though Willingham dropped out of the literary scene when he left New York in 1953, he maintained his friendship with Vladimir Nabokov. Broke and isolated, Nabokov was teaching at Cornell University and considering moving from the U.S. Willingham encouraged him to sell his books to Hollywood and passed along a copy of Lolita to Kubrick, who agreed to buy it. Willingham arranged the deal and wrote the first drafts, before giving way to Nabokov, who'd never written a screenplay but contributed significantly and also profited financially. The film was released with a screenplay credited to Nabokov, but is really an amalgam of Willingham, Nabokov and Kubrick's work, and it was nominated for an Academy Award. Willingham's fifth and final collaboration with Kubrick was One-Eyed Jacks (1961) with Marlon Brando. The three collaborated on the story for a year before Kubrick left and Brando directed himself in the film.

Willingham's next assignment was adapting Charles Webb’s novel The Graduate for director Mike Nichols, who discarded Willingham's script in favor of one by Buck Henry. Before the film was released, Willingham insisted that screenplay credit be determined through arbitration with the Writers' Guild, and much to Henry and Nichols's annoyance, Willingham was given shared credit. The film was nominated for seven Academy Awards including Best Picture and Best Screenplay. Willingham's collaboration with actor Dustin Hoffman continued with an adaptation of Thomas Berger’s Little Big Man, for which Willingham was nominated for Writer's Guild Award. They attempted a third collaboration, an adaptation of Malcolm Braly’s prison memoir On The Yard, but it was never made. During this period, Willingham also wrote an extended treatment for the film Patton (1970) and a screenplay for Robert Altman’s Thieves Like Us (1974).

Willingham always considered film work secondary to his books. Rambling Rose (1972), his next novel, was an autobiographical story about his childhood in Georgia featuring comic characterizations of his parents and siblings. The one fully fictional character is Rose, an eroticized housekeeper who comes to stay with the family as Buddy, age 12, is beginning to become curious about sex.

The Big Nickel (1975) completed the Dick Davenport trilogy conceived 25 years earlier in the wake of first success. His final novel was The Building of Venus Four (1977), a satirical work that was poorly received.

Soon after, Willingham went through a cataclysm: His New Hampshire house burned down, destroying all of his personal papers. He stopped working and regained his health, reading and reflecting during a decade of philosophical and spiritual re-evaluation. He re-emerged in 1989 to do movie work again, his first assignment, adapting one of his own novels directly to the screen.

Rambling Rose (1991) starred Robert Duvall, Diane Ladd and Laura Dern as Rose. In 1994, Willingham also began a screenplay for filmmaker/Amblin founder Steven Spielberg titled Julie’s Valley about a pioneer family attacked by Native Americans on the Oregon Trail. However, after delivering the draft, he was diagnosed with lung cancer and died February 19, 1995, and the film was not ever made.

Willingham's work is now generally out of print. In a biography written for the Literary Guild, author Herman Wouk blamed a twist of fate, a newspaper strike coinciding with publication of Eternal Fire, limiting its readership. Publisher Donald I. Fine echoed this notion in his re-issue of the book in 1986, and perhaps this is a partial explanation why Eternal Fire, arguably deserving of recognition by the literary awards which would have secured him a brighter place in the postwar pantheon, was overlooked. At the same time, as early as 1969, an article entitled “Calder Willingham: The Forgotten Novelist,” appeared in a literary quarterly and most current references refer to him as one of the under-appreciated talents of his generation.

== Novels ==
- End as a Man (1947)
- Geraldine Bradshaw (1950)
- Gates of Hell (1951)
- Reach to the Stars (1951)
- Natural Child (1952)
- To Eat a Peach (1955)
- Eternal Fire (1963)
- Providence Island (1969)
- Rambling Rose (1972)
- The Big Nickel (1975)
- The Building of Venus Four (1977)

== Screenplays ==
- The Strange One (1957)
- Paths of Glory (1957) (with Stanley Kubrick and Jim Thompson)
- The Bridge on the River Kwai (1957) (uncredited)
- The Vikings (1958)
- Spartacus (1960) (uncredited)
- One-Eyed Jacks (1961)
- The Graduate (1967) (with Buck Henry)
- Little Big Man (1970)
- Thieves Like Us (1974) (with Robert Altman and Joan Tewkesbury)
- Thou Shalt Not Commit Adultery (1978) (TV) (with Del Reisman)
- Rambling Rose (1991)
