= Rumor Has It (film) =

2005 American romantic comedy film directed by Rob Reiner

- Theatrical release poster
- Directed by: Rob Reiner
- Written by: Ted Griffin
- Produced by: Ben Cosgrove; Paula Weinstein
- Starring: Jennifer Aniston; Kevin Costner; Shirley MacLaine; Mark Ruffalo; Richard Jenkins; Mena Suvari
- Cinematography: Peter Deming
- Edited by: Robert Leighton
- Music by: Marc Shaiman
- Production companies: Village Roadshow Pictures; Section Eight Productions; Spring Creek Productions
- Distributed by: Warner Bros. Pictures
- Release date: December 25, 2005
- Running time: 96 minutes
- Country: United States
- Language: English
- Budget: $70 million
- Box office: $88.9 million

Rumor Has It (stylized as Rumor Has It... in the American market) is a 2005 American romantic comedy film directed by Rob Reiner, and starring Jennifer Aniston, Kevin Costner, Shirley MacLaine and Mark Ruffalo.

The concept of the screenplay by Ted Griffin is that a woman learns that her mother and grandmother may be the inspiration for the 1963 novel The Graduate by Charles Webb.

Rumor Has It was released by Warner Bros. Pictures on December 25, 2005. The film received negative reviews from critics and was a box office disappointment, grossing $88.9 million against its $70 million budget.

== Plot ==
In 1997, Sarah Huttinger, an obituary and wedding announcement writer for The New York Times, returns to her hometown of Pasadena, California, for her younger sister Annie's wedding, accompanied by her fiancé, lawyer Jeff Daly. There, she tells her grandmother Katharine Richelieu that she is unsure about getting married. Katharine then lets slip that her late daughter, Sarah's mother Jocelyn, ran off to Cabo San Lucas a week before her own wedding.

Sarah visits her mother's best friend Aunt Mitsy, who confirms that Jocelyn spent time with their prep school classmate Beau Burroughs the week before her wedding to Sarah's father Earl. She mentions that Beau was also friends with Charles Webb, the author of the novel The Graduate.

Jeff points out Sarah's parents were married just short of nine months before her birth, leading her to wonder if Beau might really be her biological father. Sarah also accuses her grandmother of being the inspiration for Mrs. Robinson, the older character who seduced the young man in The Graduate, who later ran away with her daughter.

After the wedding, Sarah decides to fly to San Francisco, where Beau, now a highly successful and very wealthy Silicon Valley Internet wizard, is giving a speech. She meets him, and he admits to sleeping with her mother and grandmother. However, Beau assures Sarah he could not be her father because he is sterile after having suffered blunt testicular trauma while playing a soccer game in high school. They go out for drinks, and the following morning she wakes up in Beau's bed in his Half Moon Bay home – the third generation in her family to have sex with Beau.

Although Sarah is guilt-stricken by her behavior, Beau convinces her to be his date at a charity ball, where she meets Beau's son Blake. Beau explains his wife wanted a biological child so was artificially inseminated with a sperm donor to become pregnant. Mollified, Sarah kisses him but is caught by Jeff, who has returned to California to find her after not hearing from her since she went to meet Beau. An argument ensues and Jeff leaves for NYC.

Dejected, Sarah returns to Katharine's, who flies into a rage when she learns Beau has slept with her granddaughter as well. The two learn Annie suffered an anxiety attack while flying to her honeymoon and wants to talk to Sarah. Sarah tells her about the sexual relations three generations of Richelieu/Huttinger women have had with Beau. She reassures Annie she truly is in love with her husband Scott and, in doing so, realizes she is ready to marry Jeff.

It is also revealed that Earl was the one who accidentally caused Beau's testicular trauma. This makes Beau somewhat nervous to be around him, while Katherine is quite pleased by the revelation. Earl reveals to Sarah he always knew about Jocelyn and Beau's affair. Jocelyn returned to him because she loved him and knew she could build a life with him. On the night she returned, Sarah was conceived. This explained the slightly early timing between her parents' wedding and her own birth.

Determined to win Jeff back, Sarah returns to New York and tells him about her feelings. They reconcile on the condition that if they ever have a daughter, she will not be allowed anywhere near Beau. The film ends with Sarah and Jeff's wedding.

== Cast ==
- Jennifer Aniston as Sarah Huttinger
- Kevin Costner as Beau Burroughs
- Shirley MacLaine as Katharine Richelieu
- Mark Ruffalo as Jeff Daly
- Richard Jenkins as Earl Huttinger
- Christopher McDonald as Roger McManus
- Steve Sandvoss as Scott
- Mena Suvari as Annie Huttinger
- Mike Vogel as Blake Burroughs

In addition, Kathy Bates appears, uncredited, in the role of Aunt Mitsy, while George Hamilton has a brief uncredited non-speaking cameo as himself.

== Production ==
Screenwriter Ted Griffin was the initial director, but problems arose soon after principal photography began on July 21, 2004. The production fell several days behind schedule in the first week, and on August 5, Griffin fired cinematographer Edward Lachman from the project. Griffin was, in turn, let go by executive producer Steven Soderbergh the following day, and the production shut down to allow replacement Rob Reiner to make script, cast, and crew changes before resuming filming on August 18. Reiner replaced initial cast members Charlie Hunnam, Lesley Ann Warren, Tony Bill, and Greta Scacchi.

== Soundtrack ==
Rumor Has It... OST

Soundtrack album by Nellie McKay
- Released: January 3, 2006
- Genre: Score
- Length: 20:50
- Label: Columbia Records

Nellie McKay chronology
| Monster-in-Law (2005) | Rumor Has It... OST (2006) | Last Holiday (2006) |

All tracks are written by Nellie McKay except where noted.

| No. | Title | Length |
|---|---|---|
| 1. | "Black Sheep" | 2:32 |
| 2. | "BB Blues" | 2:38 |
| 3. | "Just One Of Those Things" | 5:36 |
| 4. | "Pasadena Girl" | 4:14 |
| 5. | "Face of a Faith" | 2:03 |
| 6. | "Baby (You've Got What It Takes)" (track 6 features Taj Mahal) | 3:47 |
| Total length: | | 20:50 |

== Reception ==
=== Critical response ===
On review aggregator Rotten Tomatoes, the film holds an approval rating of 21% based on 116 reviews, with an average rating of 4.50/10. The site's critics consensus reads: "This riff on The Graduate has a solid cast, but is too lightweight to fully register." Metacritic gave the film a weighted average score of 35 out of 100 based on 29 critics, indicating "generally unfavorable reviews". Audiences polled by CinemaScore gave the film an average grade of "B" on an A+ to F scale.

A. O. Scott of The New York Times said, "I suppose Rumor Has It could be worse, though at the moment I'm at a loss to say just how. Ms. MacLaine and Mr. Costner are seasoned professionals, giving lackluster laugh lines more juice than they deserve, and Jennifer Aniston is as plucky and engaging as ever ... [but her] efforts are wasted in a movie that can't even seem to sustain interest in itself."

Roger Ebert of the Chicago Sun-Times observed, "The plot ... sounds like a gimmick. That's because it is a gimmick. But it's a good gimmick. And Rumor Has It works for good reasons, including sound construction and the presence of Kevin Costner ... a natural actor with enormous appeal ... This is not a great movie, but it's very watchable and has some good laughs. The casting of Aniston is crucial, because she's the heroine of this story, and ... has the presence to pull it off."

Mick LaSalle of the San Francisco Chronicle said, "The movie has that fatal triptych that is becoming Reiner's romantic-comedy signature: drippy sentiment, zany scenes that trivialize the characters and a horror of adventure ... needless to say, Rumor Has It fails as a successor to The Graduate. It fails artistically but also philosophically, in that it rebuts the spirit of the earlier film while offering nothing attractive in its place."

Peter Travers of Rolling Stone awarded it one out of four stars, calling it a "comic turd" and adding, "The creepy script, by T.M. Griffin, is directed by Rob Reiner in a sleepwalking daze that Costner emulates by rotely repeating his performance in The Upside of Anger and in the process squeezing all the juice."

Brian Lowry of Variety said, "As muddled in most respects as its title, Rumor Has It... begins with an intriguing premise ... but it devolves into a bland romance spiced with too little comedy ... There's a germ of an idea here, but Reiner and Griffin race through the plot beats so rapidly that poor Sarah seldom has time to breathe, which also describes the movie ... [Aniston] never settles down enough to offer more than a shrill whine and pained expression."

=== Box office ===
The film opened at number 10 at the U.S. box office, on 2,815 screens on Christmas Day 2005, and earned $3,473,155 on that first day. It eventually grossed $43,000,262 domestically and $45,933,300 in international markets for a worldwide box office total of $88,933,562.

== Home media ==
The film was released on DVD on May 9, 2006. It grossed $21 million in US DVD sales.

== See also ==
- List of American films of 2005
- Second weekend in box office performance § Second-weekend increase
