= Second Thoughts (1983 film) =

- Theatrical release poster
- Directed by: Lawrence Turman
- Screenplay by: Steve Brown
- Story by: Steve Brown; Terry Louise Fisher
- Produced by: Lawrence Turman; David Foster
- Starring: Lucie Arnaz; Craig Wasson; Ken Howard
- Cinematography: King Baggot
- Edited by: Neil Travis
- Music by: Henry Mancini
- Production companies: David Foster Productions; EMI Films
- Distributed by: Universal Pictures; Associated Film Distribution
- Release date: February 1983
- Running time: 98 minutes
- Country: United States
- Language: English
- Budget: $5 million

Second Thoughts is a 1983 American comedy-drama film directed by Lawrence Turman and starring Lucie Arnaz, Craig Wasson, Ken Howard and Anne Schedeen.

It was the second feature directed by Turman, who was better known as a producer.

== Plot ==
Lawyer Amy finds herself courted by two very different men: her client, a roguish street musician named Will, and her old boyfriend John Michael. A curious triangle develops as Amy gets pregnant by Will and both men vie for her affections.

== Cast ==
- Lucie Arnaz as Amy
- Craig Wasson as Will
- Ken Howard as John Michael
- Anne Schedeen as Janis
- Arthur Rosenberg as Dr. Eastman
- Peggy McCay as Dr. Carpenter
- Tammy Taylor as Sharon
- James O'Connell as Chief Staab
- Louis Giambalvo as Sergeant Cabrillo
- Alex Kubik as Officer Behnke
- Charles Lampkin as Judge Richards
- Michael Prince as Alfred Venable
- Susan Duvall as Trudy
- Larry David as Monroe Clark
- Joseph Whipp as Jailer
- Annette McCarthy as Nurse

== Production ==
Lawrence Turman wrote in his memoirs that he was inspired to make the film by reading a news article about a teenage boy who got his girlfriend pregnant and kidnapped her so she would not get an abortion. He made a TV film based on the same article, Unwed Father, and Second Thoughts was another attempt at the story. Turman wrote:

To my dismay; I was not clear enough about injecting my own values into that story; the guy in Second Thoughts kidnaps the girl and plans to hold her captive until it becomes too late for her to have an abortion. Fortunately, in the film he does not succeed; nonetheless, I was not tuned-in enough to see how unsympathetic his actions were. And I’m pro-choice.

The original title was Bastards. Turman had previous directed once before, The Marriage of a Young Stockbroker, and said the decision for him to direct Second Thoughts was "kind of intuitive. I liked the story and I wanted to do it. Creatively it felt right." He also added, "I wasn't interested in abortion at all. What interests me is caring, commitment, passion. The young man (the Craig Wasson character) becomes a very committed person in the course of the movie."

Filming started in September 1981 and was completed by February 1982. Much of the film was shot in Santa Fe where the script had been written. Finance came from Britain's EMI Films, then under the management of Barry Spikings.

Lucie Arnaz chose to do this film over Poltergeist, which she had also been offered, because she believed it gave her a better acting opportunity.

== Reception ==
The Los Angeles Times said the film "doesn't warrant a second thought".
