= The Marriage of a Young Stockbroker =

1971 film by Lawrence Turman

- Theatrical release poster
- Directed by: Lawrence Turman
- Written by: Lorenzo Semple Jr.
- Based on: The Marriage of a Young Stockbroker by Charles Webb
- Produced by: Lawrence Turman
- Starring: Richard Benjamin; Joanna Shimkus; Elizabeth Ashley; Adam West; Patricia Barry
- Cinematography: László Kovács
- Edited by: Fredric Steinkamp
- Music by: Fred Karlin
- Distributed by: 20th Century Fox
- Release date: August 19, 1971
- Running time: 95 minutes
- Country: United States
- Language: English
- Budget: $2,230,000 or $1.5 million

The Marriage of a Young Stockbroker is a 1971 American romantic comedy-drama film produced and directed by Lawrence Turman (in his directorial debut) and written by Lorenzo Semple Jr., based on a novel of the same title by Charles Webb. Turman had produced 1967's high-grossing hit The Graduate, also adapted from a book by Webb.

It stars Richard Benjamin in the title role and Joanna Shimkus as his beleaguered wife, with Adam West, Elizabeth Ashley, Patricia Barry, and Tiffany Bolling in supporting roles.

== Plot ==
The story mainly deals with the crumbling marriage of William Alren and his wife Lisa, and how William uses voyeurism and extra-marital affairs to "spice up" his marriage. William gives up his career as a stockbroker, and takes up voyeurism full-time.

After putting up with her husband's various dalliances, Lisa is advised by her outspoken sister Nan to get a divorce. Nan's own marriage to Chester is in no better shape than Lisa's and equally on the rocks. The film ends with William and Lisa reunited, but not before Lisa finally gets "revenge" on her husband.

== Cast ==
- Richard Benjamin as William Alren
- Joanna Shimkus as Lisa
- Adam West as Chester
- Elizabeth Ashley as Nan
- Patricia Barry as Dr. Sadler
- Tiffany Bolling as Train Girl

== Critical reception ==
Critic Leonard Maltin felt that while the film was a "humorous and sad depiction of marital breakdown", the cast was let down by a script that "seems uncertain as to what point it wants to drive across" (Maltin, 1991: 769). Steven Scheuer concurred somewhat, saying that while the film was "occasionally amusing" it also tended to be "generally heavy-handed" (Scheuer, 1990: 672).

Roger Greenspun generally found the picture to be miscast, especially Richard Benjamin, feeling that while he is "a good comedian [he is] miscast [in this role]" (Greenspun, 1971). He also thought it closer to an "unsuccessful television pilot" than a movie, in terms of its treatment of themes such as "sexual mechanics, the mechanics of marital supremacy, [and] the nuclear family as a machine for getting on in the suburbs" (Greenspun, 1971). Leslie Halliwell called it a "sardonic adult comedy of the battle of the sexes" (Halliwell, 2000: 522).

== See also ==
- List of American films of 1971
