= Neighbors (novel) =

1980 novel by Thomas Berger

- First edition
- Author: Thomas Berger
- Cover artist: Fred Marcellino
- Language: English
- Genre: Psychological novel
- Publisher: Delacorte Press/Seymour Lawrence
- Publication date: 1980
- Publication place: United States
- Media type: Print (hardback)
- Pages: 275pp
- ISBN: 0-440-06556-9
- Preceded by: Arthur Rex: A Legendary Novel
- Followed by: Reinhart's Women

Neighbors is a 1980 novel by American author Thomas Berger. It is a satire of manners and suburbia, and a comment on emotional alienation with echoes of the works of Franz Kafka. Earl Keese’s character and situation begin realistically but become increasingly fantastic. Keese is an Everyman whose life is swiftly turned upside down. As he scrambles to reclaim his sense of normalcy and dignity, he comes to think that everyone, including his family, is against him.

== Plot summary ==
Earl Keese is a middle-aged, middle-class suburbanite with a wife, Enid, and teenage daughter, Elaine. Earl is content with his dull, unexceptional life, but this changes when a younger, less sophisticated couple, Harry and Ramona, move in next door. Harry is physically intimidating and vulgar; Ramona is sexually aggressive, and both impose themselves on the Keese household. Their free-spirited personalities and overbearing and boorish behavior endear them to Enid and Elaine, but Earl fears that he is losing control of his life and his family. Over the course of one night, the antagonism between Earl and his new neighbors escalates into suburban warfare.

== Critical reception ==
Kirkus Reviews wrote that Neighbors was "one weird book... a savage send-up of common courtesies. A fantasia on middle-class paranoia. And, perhaps above all, a lesson in how a comic master can make the same joke over and over (here, the explosions of aggression) and get a big laugh every time. Even without much shaping or sense of pace--it's more a long skit than a well-made novel--a harrowing and hilarious triumph." In an article published after Berger's death in 2014, the Los Angeles Review of Books called Neighbors "a book such as Kafka might have written had he lived in an American suburb and had a much stronger sense of humor."

== Analysis ==
Berger's off-kilter tone blurs the line between paranoia and reality, defense and offense, action and intention, ally and adversary. Harry and Ramona seem to constantly undergo changes in their respective personalities and Enid and Elaine appear to choose sides against Earl at random, but Berger also implies that it is Earl’s sense of reality that is skewed and deluded.

Earl is frustrated because he can never prove that Harry and Ramona are doing anything wrong on purpose, and the more he attempts to expose them, the more ridiculous he makes himself. Yet Earl comes to realize that Harry and Ramona have served as the crucible of his redemption: being forced out of his comfort zone of complacency and habit has provided him with an excitement he has never known before. As Earl comes to recognize value in his neighbors, he realizes that his wife is a distrustful alcoholic, his daughter is an underachiever and petty thief, and that his new neighbors can provide him with an escape from his existence of insignificance and emotional impotence. From a nightmare comes hope and a strengthened resolve to survive. In his study of Berger, writer Stanley Trachtenberg describes Neighbors as an existentialist parable in which "the loss of coherence between various aspects of self comically fragments the notion of identity and thus fictionalizes the existential concept of authenticity as a shaping condition of it."

In a 1980 newspaper interview, Berger said of Neighbors, "As my 10th novel, begun at the close of my 20th year as a published novelist, it is appropriately a bizarre celebration of whatever gift I have, the strangest of all my narratives . . . the morality of this work, like that of all my other volumes, will be in doubt until the end of the narrative – and perhaps to the end of eternity, now that I think about it."

== Characters ==
- Earl Keese
- Enid Keese
- Elaine Keese
- Harry
- Ramona

== Adaptations ==
A film version was released in 1981, starring John Belushi and Dan Aykroyd. It was also adapted into a play by Eve Summer, which premiered in Worcester, Massachusetts in 2007.
