= Blade (1973 film) =

- Directed by: Ernest Pintoff
- Written by: Ernest Pintoff; Jeff Lieberman
- Produced by: George Manasse
- Starring: John Marley; Jon Cypher; Kathryn Walker; William Prince; Keene Curtis
- Release date: 1973
- Running time: 90 minutes
- Country: United States
- Language: English

Blade is a 1973 American mystery thriller film directed by Ernest Pintoff and starring John Marley, Jon Cypher, Kathryn Walker, William Prince and Keene Curtis.

== Cast ==
- John Marley as Tommy Blade
- Jon Cypher as Petersen
- Kathryn Walker as Maggie
- William Prince as Powers
- John Schuck as Reardon
- Peter White as Freund
- Rue McClanahan as Gail
- Morgan Freeman as Chris
- Michael McGuire as Quincy
- Joe Santos as Spinelli
- Ted Lange as Henry Watson
- Julius Harris as Card Player
- Keene Curtis as Steiner
- Marshall Efron as Fat man
- Steve Landesberg as Debaum

== Reception ==
Leonard Maltin awarded the film two and a half stars, describing it as "A bit pretentious and involved; fairly absorbing."
