= The Graduate =

1967 film by Mike Nichols

- Theatrical release poster
- Directed by: Mike Nichols
- Screenplay by: Calder Willingham; Buck Henry
- Based on: The Graduate (1963 novella) by Charles Webb
- Produced by: Lawrence Turman
- Starring: Anne Bancroft; Dustin Hoffman; Katharine Ross
- Cinematography: Robert Surtees
- Edited by: Sam O'Steen
- Music by: Paul Simon (songs); Dave Grusin (score)
- Production company: Lawrence Turman Productions
- Distributed by: Embassy Pictures (U.S.); United Artists (International)
- Release dates: December 20, 1967 (premiere); December 21, 1967 (U.S.)
- Running time: 106 minutes
- Country: United States
- Language: English
- Budget: $3 million
- Box office: $104.9 million (North America)

The Graduate is a 1967 American romantic comedy-drama film directed by Mike Nichols, adapted by Buck Henry and Calder Willingham from Charles Webb's 1963 novella. It stars Anne Bancroft, Dustin Hoffman, and Katharine Ross. The film follows Benjamin Braddock (Hoffman), a recent college graduate who is seduced by an older married woman, Mrs. Robinson (Bancroft), but falls for her daughter, Elaine (Ross). The soundtrack was recorded by Simon & Garfunkel, and featured the hit single "Mrs. Robinson".

Produced independently and distributed domestically by Embassy Pictures, The Graduate was released December 21, 1967. It grossed $104.9 million in the United States and Canada, making it the highest-grossing film of 1967 in North America. Adjusted for inflation (as of 2021), its gross is $857 million, making it the 22nd-highest-grossing film in the United States and Canada. It received seven nominations at the 40th Academy Awards, with Nichols winning for Best Director.

In 1996, The Graduate was selected for preservation in the U.S. National Film Registry as "culturally, historically, or aesthetically significant". The American Film Institute ranked it the 7th-greatest American film in 1997 and the 17th-greatest in 2007. It is regarded by some to be one of the greatest films of all time.

== Plot ==
After earning his bachelor's degree, Benjamin Braddock returns to his parents' home in Pasadena, California, undecided what to do next with his life. During his graduation party, Mrs. Robinson, the wife of his father's law partner, asks him to drive her home. Once there, she reveals that she is an alcoholic and tries to seduce him. He resists her advances, but later invites Mrs. Robinson to the Taft Hotel, where he registers under the surname Gladstone. Benjamin spends the summer idly floating in his parents' swimming pool by day and meeting Mrs. Robinson at the hotel at night. During one of their trysts, Mrs. Robinson reveals that she and her husband married after she accidentally became pregnant with their daughter, Elaine. When Benjamin jokingly suggests that he date Elaine, Mrs. Robinson angrily forbids it.

Benjamin's parents and Mr. Robinson pester Benjamin to ask Elaine out. He reluctantly takes her out, but attempts to sabotage the date by ignoring her, driving recklessly and taking her to a strip club. She flees in tears, but Benjamin chases after her, apologizes and kisses her. They eat at a drive-in restaurant, where they bond over their shared uncertainty about their future plans after college, although Elaine has not yet graduated from UC Berkeley. After they visit the Taft Hotel for a late-night drink and the staff greet Benjamin as Mr. Gladstone, Elaine deduces that Benjamin is having an affair. Benjamin admits to having an affair with a married woman whom he does not name. He tells Elaine the affair is over and asks to see her again.

To prevent Benjamin from dating Elaine, Mrs. Robinson threatens to tell her about their affair. To thwart this, Benjamin goes to the Robinson home and tells Elaine that the married woman is her mother. Elaine throws Benjamin out of the house and returns to school at Berkeley. Benjamin follows her there, hoping to regain her affections. Elaine initially rejects him and briefly dates a medical student, Carl. When she learns her mother lied about Benjamin raping her, she reconciles with him. Benjamin pushes for marriage, but Elaine is uncertain. Mr. Robinson arrives at Berkeley and angrily confronts Benjamin. He informs him that he and Mrs. Robinson are getting divorced and threatens to have him jailed if he keeps seeing Elaine. Mr. Robinson forces Elaine to leave college to marry Carl.

Benjamin drives to Pasadena and enters the Robinson home searching for Elaine. He finds Mrs. Robinson, who tells him that he cannot prevent Elaine's marriage to Carl and calls the police on him. Benjamin flees the house and drives back to Berkeley. There he discovers the wedding is in Santa Barbara that very day. He speeds over 300 miles to Santa Barbara, but his car runs out of gas a short distance from the church.

Benjamin runs to the church, arriving just as the ceremony is ending. His desperate appearance and plaintive shouts of Elaine's name from the glass church gallery overlooking the seated wedding guests stir Elaine into defying her mother and fleeing the sanctuary. Benjamin fights off Mr. Robinson and repels the wedding guests by swinging a large cross, which he uses to bar the church doors, trapping everyone inside. Benjamin and Elaine escape aboard a city bus and sit among the startled passengers with Elaine still in her wedding gown. As the bus drives on, their ecstatic smiles slowly change into ambivalent expressions.

== Cast ==
- Anne Bancroft as Mrs. Robinson
- Dustin Hoffman as Benjamin Braddock
- Katharine Ross as Elaine Robinson
- William Daniels as Mr. Braddock
- Murray Hamilton as Mr. Robinson
- Elizabeth Wilson as Mrs. Braddock
- Buck Henry as Room Clerk
- Brian Avery as Carl Smith
- Walter Brooke as Mr. McGuire
- Norman Fell as Mr. McCleery
- Alice Ghostley as Mrs. Singleman
- Marion Lorne as Miss DeWitte

Several actors make uncredited appearances in minor roles. Elaine May plays the "Girl with Note for Benjamin." Richard Dreyfuss speaks two lines, about calling "the cops", in his second film role as one of the tenants in McCleery's boarding house. Ben Murphy plays the shaving fraternity brother who comes out with a double entendre. Mike Farrell is a hotel bellhop. Kevin Tighe is one of the showering fraternity brothers. Noam Pitlik is the service station attendant.

== Production ==
Getting the film made was difficult for Nichols, who, while noted for being a successful Broadway director, was still an unknown in Hollywood. Producer Lawrence Turman, who wanted only Nichols to direct it, was continually turned down for financing. Turman also said that every studio turned down the project, saying "they read the book and hated it, and no one thought it was funny". He then contacted producer Joseph E. Levine, who said he would finance the film because he had associated with Nichols on the play The Knack, and because he heard Elizabeth Taylor specifically wanted Nichols to direct her and Richard Burton in Virginia Woolf.

With financing assured, Nichols suggested Buck Henry for screenwriter, although Henry's experience had also been mostly in improvised comedy, and he had no writing background. Nichols said to Henry, "I think you could do it; I think you should do it." Nichols was paid $150,000, and was to receive one-sixth of the profits.

=== Casting ===
Nichols' first choice for Mrs. Robinson was French actress Jeanne Moreau. The motivation for this was the cliché that in French culture, "older" women tended to "train" the younger men in sexual matters. Casting for the project was challenging. Doris Day turned down an offer because the nudity required by the role offended her. Shelley Winters, Ingrid Bergman, Eva Marie Saint, Ava Gardner, Patricia Neal, Susan Hayward, Deborah Kerr, Rita Hayworth, Lana Turner and Geraldine Page were also considered for the role of Mrs. Robinson.

The role of Benjamin Braddock took two years to cast. Dustin Hoffman was cast as Liebkind in the Mel Brooks film The Producers (1967), but before filming began Hoffman begged Brooks to let him go to audition for The Graduate. Although Hoffman was reluctant to audition as he felt that he was not right for the role, when he auditioned for the role, he was just short of his 30th birthday. He was asked to perform a love scene with Ross, having previously never done one, and believed that, as he said later, "a girl like [Ross] would never go for a guy like me in a million years". Ross agreed, believing that Hoffman "looked about 3 feet tall ... so unkempt. This is going to be a disaster." Producer Joseph E. Levine later admitted that he at first believed Hoffman "was one of the messenger boys". Despite – or perhaps because of – Hoffman's awkwardness, Nichols chose him for the film.

"As far as I'm concerned, Mike Nichols did a very courageous thing casting me in a part that I was not right for, meaning I was Jewish," said Hoffman. "In fact, many of the reviews were very negative. It was kind of veiled anti-Semitism.... I was called 'big-nosed' in the reviews; 'a nasal voice'." Hoffman was paid $20,000 for his role in the film, and netted $4,000 after taxes and paying for temporary accommodations. After spending that money, Hoffman filed for New York State unemployment benefits, receiving $55 per week while living in a two-room apartment in the West Village of Manhattan.

Before Hoffman was cast, Robert Redford and Charles Grodin were among the top choices. Redford tested for the part of Benjamin (with Candice Bergen as Elaine), but Nichols thought Redford did not possess the underdog quality Benjamin needed. Grodin turned down the part at first because of the low $500/week salary offered by producer Lawrence Turman. Grodin was offered more money, but declined again because he did not believe he could prepare for a screen test for the film overnight. "If they had given me three days to prepare, I think I would have gotten the role," he said. Burt Ward was informally offered Hoffman's role, but was already committed to the role of Robin in the Batman television series.

Harrison Ford also auditioned for the role of Benjamin, but was turned down. Jack Nicholson, Steve McQueen, Anthony Perkins, Warren Beatty, George Peppard, George Hamilton, Keir Dullea, Brandon deWilde and Michael Parks were also considered for the role.

Ronald Reagan was considered for the part of Benjamin's father Mr. Braddock, which eventually went to William Daniels. Nichols cast Gene Hackman as Mr. Robinson, but he was fired after a few days of rehearsals; he was replaced by Murray Hamilton. Many years later, Hackman said that being fired from the film still hurt him.

Despite playing mother and daughter, Anne Bancroft and Katharine Ross were only eight years apart in age. Bancroft and Hoffman differed less than six.

=== Filming ===
The quality of the cinematography was influenced by Nichols, who chose Oscar winner Robert Surtees to do the photography. Surtees, who had photographed major films since the 1920s, including Ben-Hur, said later, "It took everything I had learned over 30 years to be able to do the job. I knew that Mike Nichols was a young director who went in for a lot of camera. We did more things in this picture than I ever did in one film."

Many of the exterior university campus shots of Berkeley were actually filmed on the brick campus of USC in Los Angeles.

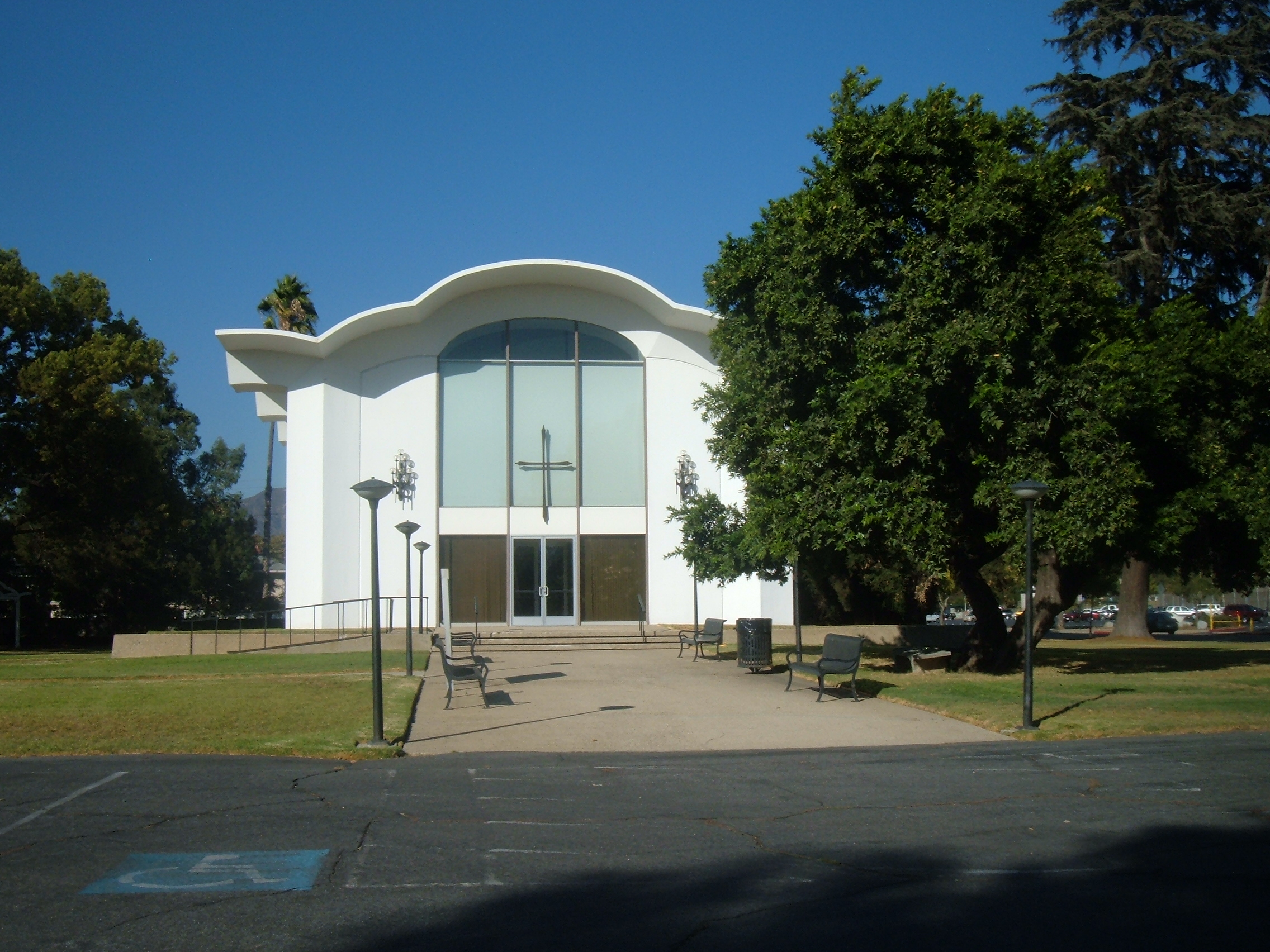
The United Methodist Church in La Verne, California used in the final act of the film.

The church used for the wedding scene is actually the United Methodist Church in La Verne. In an audio commentary released with the 40th anniversary DVD, Hoffman revealed he was uneasy about the scene in which he pounds on the church window, as the minister of the church had been watching the filming disapprovingly. The wedding scene was highly influenced by the ending of the 1924 comedy film Girl Shy starring Harold Lloyd, who also served as an advisor for the scene in The Graduate.

== Music ==
The film boosted the profile of folk-rock duo Simon & Garfunkel. Originally, Nichols and O'Steen used their existing songs like "The Sound of Silence" merely as a pacing device for the editing, until Nichols decided that substituting original music would not be effective, and decided to include them on the soundtrack, an unusual move at that time.

According to a Variety article by Peter Bart in the May 15, 2005, issue, Lawrence Turman, his producer, then made a deal for Simon to write three new songs for the movie. By the time they had nearly finished editing the film, Simon had written only one new song. Nichols begged him for more, but Simon, who was touring constantly, told him he did not have the time. He did play a few notes of a new song he had been working on: "It's not for the movie... It's a song about times past — about Mrs. Roosevelt and Joe DiMaggio and stuff." Nichols advised Simon, "It's now about Mrs. Robinson, not Mrs. Roosevelt."

== Release ==
The Graduate had a dual world premiere in New York City December 20, 1967, at the Coronet Theatre, and at the Lincoln Art Theatre on 57th Street. Its general release began on December 21, 1967.

The film played extended exclusive engagements at a small number of theaters nationally. At the Esquire Theatre in Denver, The Graduate opened on December 22, 1967, and ran for 52 consecutive weeks, one of the longest exclusive engagements in the film's national rollout, matched only by the Four Star in Los Angeles, the Coronet in New York, and the Town in Seattle.

=== Home media ===
The Graduate was released on DVD by MGM Home Entertainment in 1999 and 2007. A Blu-ray release was first issued by 20th Century Fox Home Entertainment in 2009 and later by StudioCanal in 2010. A 4K digital restoration of the film was released by The Criterion Collection in 2016. It was released on Ultra HD Blu-ray by StudioCanal in September 2025.

== Reception and legacy ==
=== Critical response ===
The Graduate was met with positive reviews from critics upon its release. A.D. Murphy of Variety and Roger Ebert of the Chicago Sun-Times praised the film, with Murphy describing it as a "delightful satirical comedy drama", and Ebert claiming it was the "funniest American comedy of the year".

Life critic Richard Schickel felt the film "starts out to satirize the alienated spirit of modern youth, does so with uncommon brilliance for its first half, but ends up selling out to the very spirit its creators intended to make fun of... It's a shame – they were halfway to something wonderful when they skidded on a patch of greasy kid stuff."

Pauline Kael wondered, "How could you convince them [younger viewers] that a movie that sells innocence is a very commercial piece of work when they're so clearly in the market to buy innocence?" Kael goes on to say that the fundamental problem with the film is in its attempt to "only succeed". Kael posited that the success of the film was "sociological", that it was based on youth being emotionally manipulatable.

For the film's thirtieth anniversary reissue, Roger Ebert retracted some of his previous praise for it and gave it three stars as compared to his original rating of four out of four stars, writing that "today, looking at The Graduate, I see Benjamin not as an admirable rebel, but as a self-centered creep whose put-downs of adults are tiresome".

He and Gene Siskel gave the film a positive review on the television program Siskel & Ebert. The film's rating in the American Film Institute list of the greatest American films fell from seventh in 1997 to 17th in the 2007 update. Lang Thompson argued that "it really hasn't dated much".

Review aggregator Rotten Tomatoes gives the film an approval rating of 88% based on 90 reviews, with an average rating of 9.10/10. The site's consensus reads: "The music, the performances, the precision in capturing the post-college malaise – The Graduate's coming-of-age story is indeed one for the ages". On the similar website, Metacritic, the film holds a score of 83 out of 100, based on 19 critics, indicating "universal acclaim".

=== In popular culture ===
Numerous films, TV shows, music videos, and commercials have quoted The Graduate. The climactic sequence in which Benjamin crashes the wedding and leaves with Elaine is frequently parodied. TV show episodes that quote the scene include the Family Guy episode "When You Wish Upon a Weinstein", The Simpsons episode "Lady Bouvier's Lover", the Archer episode "Skin Game", the New Girl episode "Elaine's Big Day", and The Office episode "Two Weeks".

The scene was elaborately parodied in the movie Wayne's World 2, and was referenced in the music video for "Love Action (I Believe in Love)" by The Human League and "If You Go" by Jon Secada, as well as the song "Crashed the Wedding" by Busted. The scene was also referenced in the 1998 finale of the Papa and Nicole advertising campaign in the United Kingdom for the MK1 Renault Clio, featuring Reeves and Mortimer and tying in with the release of the MK2 Renault Clio. The 1999 film The Other Sister contained a reference.

The leg-framing scene where Mrs. Robinson seduces Benjamin has been parodied in the Roseanne episode "David and Goliath", which includes a fantasy scene in which Jackie assumes the Bancroft role and appears to attempt to seduce David. This scene is also parodied in The Simpsons episode, "Lisa's Substitute", when Mrs. Krabappel tries to seduce Mr. Bergstrom, who was voiced by Dustin Hoffman.

The car Benjamin drives in the movie is an Alfa Romeo Spider. Based on its iconic role, Alfa Romeo sold a version of the Spider in the United States from 1985 to 1990 under the name "Spider Graduate".

In the 1992 film The Player, Robert Altman's satire of Hollywood, Buck Henry pitches a sequel to The Graduate to producer Griffin Mill (played by Tim Robbins) during the film's opening sequence. A parody of Hollywood high concept films, Henry describes the plot as Ben and Elaine living in a haunted house in Northern California, with an invalid Mrs. Robinson living in the attic.

George Michael's 1992 song, "Too Funky," features a clip of the Anne Bancroft lines, "I am not trying to seduce you... Would you like me to seduce you? Is that what you're trying to tell me?", as an intro of the song, and is repeated during the final crescendo.

In conjunction with the film's 25th anniversary home video release, alternative rock band The Lemonheads recorded a punk-style cover of Simon & Garfunkel's "Mrs. Robinson". The music video includes scenes from the film. This cover was then used in Martin Scorsese's 2013 film The Wolf of Wall Street.

The film Kingpin parodied the leg-framed shot, showing Woody Harrelson framed by his landlady's leg, and features an excerpt of "The Sound of Silence" after Harrelson's character has sex with the landlady to make up for back rent.

Hoffman recreated the church wedding scene for a 2004 Audi commercial, in which he stops his daughter (played by Lake Bell) from getting married, and tells her "you're just like your mother" as they drive off, implying he is portraying an older Benjamin who has a daughter with Elaine.

The plot of the 2005 romantic comedy film Rumor Has It, directed by Rob Reiner and starring Jennifer Aniston, Kevin Costner, Shirley MacLaine and Mark Ruffalo, revolves around a story in which a woman learns that her mother and grandmother may be the inspiration for The Graduate, and the 1963 novel of the same name it was based on.

(500) Days of Summer features a scene in which the protagonist, Tom, watches The Graduate with his then-girlfriend Summer. He is said to misinterpret the ending, a fact that serves to characterize his naivety concerning relationships.

=== Accolades ===
Award	Category	Nominee(s)	Result	Ref.
Academy Awards	Best Picture	Lawrence Turman	Nominated	
Academy Awards	Best Director	Mike Nichols	Won	
Academy Awards	Best Actor	Dustin Hoffman	Nominated	
Academy Awards	Best Actress	Anne Bancroft	Nominated	
Academy Awards	Best Supporting Actress	Katharine Ross	Nominated	
Academy Awards	Best Screenplay – Based on Material from Another Medium	Buck Henry and Calder Willingham	Nominated	
Academy Awards	Best Cinematography	Robert L. Surtees	Nominated	
British Academy Film Awards	Best Film	Mike Nichols	Won	
British Academy Film Awards	Best Direction	Mike Nichols	Won	
British Academy Film Awards	Best Actress in a Leading Role	Anne Bancroft	Nominated	
British Academy Film Awards	Best Screenplay	Buck Henry and Calder Willingham	Won	
British Academy Film Awards	Best Editing	Sam O'Steen	Won	
British Academy Film Awards	Most Promising Newcomer to Leading Film Roles	Dustin Hoffman	Won	
British Academy Film Awards	Most Promising Newcomer to Leading Film Roles	Katharine Ross	Nominated	
Directors Guild of America Awards	Outstanding Directorial Achievement in Motion Pictures	Mike Nichols	Won	
Golden Globe Awards	Best Motion Picture – Musical or Comedy		Won	
Golden Globe Awards	Best Actor in a Motion Picture – Musical or Comedy	Dustin Hoffman	Nominated	
Golden Globe Awards	Best Actress in a Motion Picture – Musical or Comedy	Anne Bancroft	Won	
Golden Globe Awards	Best Director – Motion Picture	Mike Nichols	Won	
Golden Globe Awards	Best Screenplay – Motion Picture	Buck Henry and Calder Willingham	Nominated	
Golden Globe Awards	Most Promising Newcomer – Male	Dustin Hoffman	Won	
Golden Globe Awards	Most Promising Newcomer – Female	Katharine Ross	Won	
Grammy Awards	Best Original Score Written for a Motion Picture or a Television Special	Dave Grusin and Paul Simon	Won	
Laurel Awards	Top Comedy		Nominated	
Laurel Awards	Top Male Comedy Performance	Dustin Hoffman	Nominated	
Laurel Awards	Top Female Dramatic Performance	Anne Bancroft	Nominated	
Laurel Awards	Top Female Supporting Performance	Katharine Ross	Won	
National Board of Review Awards	Top Ten Films		8th Place	
National Film Preservation Board	National Film Registry		Inducted	
New York Film Critics Circle Awards	Best Film		Nominated	
New York Film Critics Circle Awards	Best Director	Mike Nichols	Won	
New York Film Critics Circle Awards	Best Screenplay	Buck Henry and Calder Willingham	Nominated	
Online Film & Television Association Awards	Hall of Fame – Motion Picture		Honored	
Producers Guild of America Awards	PGA Hall of Fame – Motion Pictures	Lawrence Turman – The Graduate	Won	
Satellite Awards	Best Classic DVD	The Graduate: 40th Anniversary Edition	Won	
Satellite Awards	Best DVD Extras	The Graduate: 40th Anniversary Edition	Nominated	
Writers Guild of America Awards	Best Written American Comedy	Buck Henry and Calder Willingham	Won	

In 1996, The Graduate was selected for preservation in the U.S. National Film Registry by the Library of Congress as being "culturally, historically, or aesthetically significant", and placed #22 on the list of highest-grossing films in the United States and Canada, adjusted for inflation.

In 2006, Writers Guild of America ranked its screenplay 13th in WGA's list of 101 Greatest Screenplays. The film is listed in 1001 Movies You Must See Before You Die.

The film appears on the following American Film Institute lists:

- 1998: AFI's 100 Years...100 Movies – #7
- 2000: AFI's 100 Years...100 Laughs – #9
- 2002: AFI's 100 Years...100 Passions – #52
- 2004: AFI's 100 Years...100 Songs:
  - "Mrs. Robinson" – #6
- 2005: AFI's 100 Years...100 Movie Quotes:
  - Mr. McGuire: "Plastics." – #42
  - Benjamin Braddock: "Mrs. Robinson, you're trying to seduce me. Aren't you?" – #63
- 2007: AFI's 100 Years...100 Movies (10th Anniversary Edition) – #17

== Stage adaptation ==
Terry Johnson's adaptation of the original novel and the film ran on both London's West End and Broadway, and has toured the United States. There is a Brazilian version adapted by Miguel Falabella. Several actresses have starred as Mrs. Robinson, including Kathleen Turner, Lorraine Bracco, Jerry Hall, Amanda Donohoe, Morgan Fairchild, Anne Archer, Vera Fischer, Patricia Richardson and Linda Gray.

The stage production adds several scenes not in the novel nor the film, as well as using material from both film and novel.

The soundtrack uses songs by Simon & Garfunkel also not used in the film, such as "Bridge Over Troubled Water", as well as music from other popular musicians from the era, such as The Byrds and The Beach Boys. The West End production opened at the Gielgud Theatre on April 5, 2000, after previews from March 24, with Kathleen Turner starring as Mrs. Robinson. Jerry Hall replaced Turner from July 31, 2000, followed by Amanda Donohoe from February 2001, Anne Archer from June 2001, and Linda Gray from October 2001. The production closed in January 2002. The 2003 U.K. touring production starred Glynis Barber as Mrs. Robinson.

The Broadway production opened at the Plymouth Theatre April 4, 2002, and closed March 2, 2003, after 380 performances. Directed by Terry Johnson, the play featured the cast of Jason Biggs as Benjamin Braddock, Alicia Silverstone as Elaine Robinson, and Kathleen Turner as Mrs. Robinson. The play received no award nominations. Linda Gray briefly filled in for Turner in September 2002. Lorraine Bracco replaced Turner from November 19, 2002.

== Possible sequel ==
Charles Webb wrote a sequel to his original novel, titled Home School, but initially refused to publish it in its entirety because of a contract he signed in the 1960s. When he sold the film rights to The Graduate, he surrendered the rights to any sequels. If he were to publish Home School, the French media company that owns the rights to The Graduate, Canal+, would be able to adapt it for the screen without his permission. Extracts of Home School were printed in The Times on May 2, 2006. Webb told the newspaper there was a possibility he would find a publisher for the full text, provided he could retrieve the film rights using French copyright law. On May 30, 2006, The Times reported Webb had signed a publishing deal for Home School with Random House, which he hoped would enable him to instruct French lawyers to attempt to retrieve his rights. The novel was published in Britain in 2007.

== See also ==
- 1967 in film
- List of American films of 1967
- New Hollywood – 1960s–1980s American film movement
