= Neighbors (1981 film) =

1981 film by John G. Avildsen

- Theatrical release poster
- Directed by: John G. Avildsen
- Screenplay by: Larry Gelbart
- Based on: Neighbors by Thomas Berger
- Produced by: Richard D. Zanuck; David Brown
- Starring: John Belushi; Dan Aykroyd; Cathy Moriarty; Kathryn Walker
- Cinematography: Gerald Hirschfeld
- Edited by: Jane Kurson
- Music by: Bill Conti
- Production company: Columbia Pictures
- Distributed by: Columbia Pictures
- Release date: December 18, 1981 (United States)
- Running time: 94 minutes
- Country: United States
- Language: English
- Budget: $8.5 million
- Box office: $30 million

Neighbors is a 1981 American black comedy film directed by John G. Avildsen and starring John Belushi, Dan Aykroyd, Cathy Moriarty, and Kathryn Walker. Based on the 1980 novel Neighbors by Thomas Berger, the film's plot follows the mild-mannered and conservative Earl Keese (Belushi) as his suburbanite life is upended by the arrival of his new neighbors, the chaotic and eccentric Victor Zeck (Aykroyd) and his sultry wife Ramona (Moriarty). The film takes liberties with Berger's story and features a more upbeat ending. The screenplay of the film is officially credited to Larry Gelbart, although it was extensively rewritten to Gelbart's public disapproval. Released two and a half months before Belushi's death, Neighbors marks his last film performance.

== Plot ==
Earl Keese is an straight-laced man leading a quiet life on a dead-end street in a suburban neighborhood, alongside his dismissive wife, Enid. His peaceful life changes when the eccentric Zecks—charming and chaotic Vic, and sultry and seductive Ramona—move into the abandoned, disheveled house next door. The Zecks immediately impose themselves on the Keese household, with Earl quickly overwhelmed by Vic's quick-talking ways and flustered by Ramona's sexual overtures. After Vic cons Earl into giving him cash and his car to collect takeaway food, only to use it to make pasta at home, Earl responds by trying to prank Vic by hiding his car. However, due to the car's faulty brakes, Earl accidentally pushes it into the nearby swamp.

After confessing his misdeed, Earl shows Vic the swamp and falls in, nearly drowning. In his attempt to escape, he pulls Vic in with him. Vic seemingly drowns, and the stunned Earl returns home, only to be scared by the waiting Vic before Ramona again attempts to seduce him. Believing them to be mentally ill, Earl locks them in his basement and unsuccessfully calls for help. Enid, however, charmed by the Zecks, believes Earl is being irrational.

When Elaine, the Keese's punky daughter, returns home, she is equally charmed by the new neighbors. However, when Elaine shows Vic her new edible panties, Earl punches him, and the Zecks return home.

The following morning, Earl goes to remove the vandalism painted on his car, assuming Vic is responsible, but finds that Vic has already cleaned it. After Vic's wrecked car is towed out of the swamp, he informs Earl that he plans to move due to the nearby power lines. Earl begs Vic to stay, as, despite the chaos of the previous night, it was the most fun he has ever had. Vic reveals that he and Ramona are not legally married and tells Earl to take her. Earl returns home to find Ramona in his bed. They almost have sex before they are interrupted by a panicked Vic, who has flown a remote-controlled model airplane into his house, starting a fire that burns it down.

While the ineffectual fire department watches, Vic drives away in Earl's car with his wife and daughter. Ramona tells Earl that Vic traded her for his family. Seemingly unaffected by his family's abandonment, Earl prepares to take Ramona on a date, before Vic returns with the family and takeaway food. Over dinner, Earl suggests they escape their stagnant lives and move to the city, believing Vic deliberately burned his house down for a substantial insurance payment which can fund their new lifestyle. Instead, Vic and Ramona reveal that the house still belonged to the Keese's former neighbor, who moved to a nursing home where Vic worked.

The Keeses offer to let the Zecks move into with them, even offering them the master bedroom, but, to their dismay, Vic and Ramona choose to leave because the area does not suit their extroverted personalities. Earl then accuses the Zecks of stealing his checkbook, but Enid and Elaine find it untouched. Remorseful, Earl signs his car over to the Zecks.

Earl settles back into the mundanity of his former life, while Elaine returns to boarding school and Enid leaves for an emergency class on Native American studies. Vic and Ramona return, offering Earl the chance to join them on their adventures to anywhere. Earl readily accepts, burning his house to the ground before the trio drives away.

== Cast ==
- John Belushi as Earl Keese
- Dan Aykroyd as Victor "Vic" Zeck
- Cathy Moriarty as Ramona Zeck
- Kathryn Walker as Enid Keese
- Lauren-Marie Taylor as Elaine Keese
- Igors Gavon as Chic
- Dru-Ann Chuckran as Chic's Wife
- Tim Kazurinsky as Pa Greavy
- Tino Insana as Perry Greavy
- P. L. Brown as Police Officer #1
- Henry Judd Baker as Police Officer #2
- Sherman G. Lloyd as Fireman #1
- Bert Kittel as Fireman #2
- J. B. Friend as Additional Fireman
- Bernie Friedman as Additional Fireman

== Production ==
Thomas Berger's best-selling novel, Neighbors, was published in 1980. Columbia Pictures acquired the rights to film the novel and assembled a high-profile cast and crew: Richard D. Zanuck and David Brown had produced Jaws (1975); John G. Avildsen had won an Academy Award for Best Director for Rocky (1976); veteran comedy writer Larry Gelbart had developed the hit TV series M*A*S*H (1972–1983); and John Belushi and Dan Aykroyd had been stars of TV's Saturday Night Live (on which they appeared from 1975 to 1979) and the film The Blues Brothers (1980). The film's female leads were played by Cathy Moriarty, who had made her film debut in Martin Scorsese's Raging Bull (1980), and Kathryn Walker, who had been the girlfriend of Belushi's National Lampoon colleague Douglas Kenney (1946–1980).

The production of Neighbors was troubled. John Belushi and Dan Aykroyd switched their roles in pre-production, acting against type (usual-wild man Belushi played the meek Earl Keese and usual-straight-arrow Aykroyd played the obnoxious Vic Zeck). Belushi and Aykroyd also argued constantly with director John G. Avildsen (as they believed that he had no understanding of comedy), and lobbied to have him removed from the picture. Belushi wanted either Aykroyd, himself or John Landis to direct the film. Avildsen also argued with producers Richard D. Zanuck and David Brown, and screenwriter Larry Gelbart objected to the changes made to his screenplay by Dan Aykroyd. John Belushi's drug problems also impaired the film's production, and Neighbors proved to be Belushi's final film before he died of a drug overdose.

Tom Scott was originally assigned to compose the score for Neighbors but was replaced by Avildsen's frequent collaborator Bill Conti. John Belushi unsuccessfully tried to have the film finish with a song written and performed by the punk rock group Fear (Belushi had discovered the band and brought them to Cherokee Studios to record songs for the film). Music producing partners Steve Cropper and Bruce Robb remember recording the band's music, but nobody knows exactly what happened with the final soundtrack which was ultimately replaced in the film by Conti's more traditional movie score. "How can I describe what it was like recording in the early days of punk?" said music producer and Cherokee owner Bruce Robb. "We had decided to track the song selection in order, and were on track 4 before the band realized they were all using different set lists. The irony is we couldn't tell." Upset with Belushi's antics and believing that Fear's music was inappropriate for Neighbors, the movie studio eventually forced the band off the soundtrack project. To make up for it, Belushi got them a guest spot on Saturday Night Live.

A comprehensive look at the troubled production of Neighbors can be found in the books Wired: The Short Life and Fast Times of John Belushi by Bob Woodward (1984) and Belushi: A Biography by Judith Belushi Pisano and Tanner Colby (2005).

== Release ==
=== Critical reception ===
For one test version of the film, the head of Columbia Pictures, Frank Price, made the contentious decision to have quotations from positive press reviews of Berger's book assembled into a caption that would serve as a prologue to the film (this move prompted an angry missive from Dan Aykroyd). The final version of Neighbors was released to cinemas in December 1981 and it received mixed reaction from both critics and from some fans of Belushi and Aykroyd, who did not like that they played the complete opposite character types that they usually would. Columbia Pictures made sure to open the film in a larger than expected number of theatres because they anticipated it would draw a very large initial turnout from fans of its two stars, and could do well for the holiday season before being derailed by poor word-of-mouth. Per Box Office Mojo, Neighbors earned almost $24 million of its ultimate $30 million grosses in only a few weeks of release at the end of 1981. The movie thus made a profit because it only cost $8 million to produce.

David Ansen, writing for Newsweek Magazine, wrote:

Thomas Berger's paranoid comic novel could have been made a fascinating movie in the hands of, say, Roman Polanski, who knows how to make a comedy of menace. John G. Avildsen (Rocky) doesn't have a clue: you can't twist reality if you can't establish a reality to twist. Belushi and Aykroyd obviously got cast because they're "bankable," but no one seems to have asked if they were appropriate. The parts demand subtle comic acting – they do TV turns. Just how much blame falls on Larry Gelbart's disjointed script is hard to say (Avildsen could make any writer look bad), but without question Bill Conti has come up with the year's most offensive score – a cattle prod of cartoonish cuteness that only underlines the movie's desperate uncertainty of tone. The ads for Neighbors call it "a comic nightmare;" it's more like a sour case of creative indigestion.

Roger Ebert, reviewing for the Chicago Sun-Times, awarded the film three stars out of four, and wrote that "Neighbors is a truly interesting comedy, an offbeat experiment in hallucinatory black humor. It grows on you." Ebert also wrote approvingly of Belushi and Aykroyd as the leads, citing it as "brilliant casting, especially since they divided the roles somewhat against our expectations." In his book Guide for the Film Fanatic, Danny Peary wrote, "I think this surreal comedy is imaginatively done, and perfectly conveys the lunacy of the two comics...I'm glad they went against type because both actors are at their absolute best." Peary argued that the "final picture is faithful to Thomas Berger's zany, satirical novel" but noted that he prefers "the film's happier ending."

Neighbors holds a 57% approval rating on Rotten Tomatoes based on seven reviews.

== Soundtrack ==
In December 2007, Varèse Sarabande released the Neighbors soundtrack on CD. The CD contains the score by Bill Conti as heard in the film (tracks 1–30), as well as the unused score by Tom Scott (tracks 31–49).

No.	Title	Length
1.	"Neighbors Main Title"	2:58
2.	"New Neighbors"	3:41
3.	"A Little T.V."	0.33
4.	"Buying Dinner"	0:57
5.	"Upstairs"	1:21
6.	"More T.V."	1:32
7.	"In the Yard"	1:11
8.	"Looking Around"	2:42
9.	"Home Sweet Home"	0:32
10.	"Baby's New Do"	0:43
11.	"The Swamp"	0:56
12.	"Quicksand"	3:18
13.	"Locked In"	0:29
14.	"A Vivisectionist?"	1:10
15.	"Getting Towed"	0:43
16.	"Lights Out"	0:28
17.	"Night Watch"	0:31
18.	"Let's Talk"	1:00
19.	"Over Coffee"	0:28
20.	"I'll Be Back"	0:48
21.	"Friends?"	0:43
22.	"Hi Neighbor"	1:52
23.	"Fire"	0:18
24.	"There's No Place Like Home"	1:42
25.	"Please Stay"	0:59
26.	"We'll Miss You"	0:22
27.	"Red Stone Romance"	1:58
28.	"Spruce Hill"	1:02
29.	"Leaving the Neighborhood"	2:14
30.	"End Credits"	2:37
31.	"Main Title"	1:36
32.	"1m2"	3:54
33.	"2m1"	0:39
34.	"2m3"	0:43
35.	"2m5"	1:36
36.	"3m1"	1:11
37.	"3m3"	0:43
38.	"6m1"	1:14
39.	"7m1"	0:26
40.	"7m2"	2:46
41.	"7m3"	1:19
42.	"9m1"	0:54
43.	"9m2"	2:19
44.	"10m1"	2:31
45.	"10m2"	2:56
46.	"11m1"	1:07
47.	"11m2"	3:47
48.	"12m1"	2:07
49.	"12m2"	2:26

While the film features the songs "Hello, I Love You" by The Doors, "Holiday in Cambodia" by Dead Kennedys, and "Stayin' Alive" by the Bee Gees, none of the songs are included on the soundtrack album.
