= Arthur Rex =

1978 novel by Thomas Berger

Arthur Rex: A Legendary Novel
- First edition
- Author: Thomas Berger
- Language: English
- Genre: Historical fiction
- Publisher: Delacorte Press/Seymour Lawrence
- Publication date: 1978
- Publication place: United States
- Media type: Print (hardback)
- Pages: 499 pp
- ISBN: 0-440-00362-8
- Preceded by: Who Is Teddy Villanova?
- Followed by: Neighbors

Arthur Rex: A Legendary Novel is a 1978 novel by American author Thomas Berger. Berger offers his own take on the legends of King Arthur, from the heroic monarch's inauspicious conception, to his childhood in bucolic Wales, his rise to the throne, his discovery of the great sword Excalibur, his establishment of the Knights of the Round Table, his long and honorable reign, and his heroic death in battle against the evil Mordred, his bastard son.

== Major themes ==
The author emphasizes the glory and idealism of Arthur's court at Camelot, but the ultimate futility of any attempt to ignore human nature and sinfulness. The book is written in an archaic style appropriate to the subject, but with a witty and engaging tone. It is essentially respectful of the Arthurian tales while putting a more modern, even somewhat rueful imprint on them. For instance, the wizard Merlin makes occasional anachronistic references to such things as aircraft, viruses and nuclear power, but always couched in period-appropriate terms, reminiscent of T.H. White's characterization of Merlyn in The Once and Future King (1958). Berger gives considerable attention to the adulterous relationships between Guinevere and Lancelot and between Tristan and Isolde, and even offers a somewhat sympathetic portrait of the villainous Mordred. The Lady of the Lake is a prominent character.

== Literary significance and reception ==
Arthur Rex received mixed reviews on its publication in 1978. In both positive and negative assessments of the book, reviewers noted the changes to the Arthurian legend made by the author, evidently to enhance the story's "appeal in contemporary American society."

== Characters ==
- King Arthur
- Sir Lancelot
- Sir Gawain
- Sir Kay
- Merlin
- Guinevere
- Mordred
- The Lady of the Lake
