= Lawrence Turman =

American film producer (1926–2023)

- Turman in 2005
- Born: November 28, 1926; Los Angeles, California, U.S.
- Died: July 1, 2023 (aged 96); Los Angeles, California, U.S.
- Occupation: Film producer
- Years active: 1961–2001
- Known for: Director of The Peter Stark Producing Program

Lawrence Turman (November 28, 1926 – July 1, 2023) was an American film producer. He was best known for being a producer of The Graduate, which was nominated for the Academy Award for Best Picture.

== Early life ==
Turman was born in Los Angeles, California, on November 28, 1926, into a Jewish family. His father was Jacob Turman and his mother Esther Gldman Turman. Turman served in the U.S. Navy during World War II.

== Career ==
Turman was nominated for the Academy Award for Best Picture as producer of The Graduate (1967). He also produced other films such as Pretty Poison (1968), The Great White Hope (1970), The Thing (1982), Mass Appeal (1984), Short Circuit (1986), The River Wild (1994), and American History X (1998).

Turman also directed two films: The Marriage of a Young Stockbroker (1971) and Second Thoughts (1983).

Turman was co-partner on The Turman/Foster Company with David Foster, which was established in 1972, to make theatrical films, which was increasingly prominent in television production, in order to eye on television movies, and planned work on series, and eyeing television sales, and the company ran under contract to Warner Bros., developing their failed television pilots, like Mass Appeal.

Turman was a member of the Producers Guild Hall of Fame. He was the director of The Peter Stark Producing Program at the University of Southern California.

Turman published the book So You Want to be a Producer in 2005.

In 2014, he appeared as himself on the fourth season of the web series On Cinema. In 2015, he appeared as himself in ESPN's 30 for 30 documentary Trojan War.

== Death ==
Turman died at the Motion Picture & Television Country House and Hospital in Los Angeles on July 1, 2023, at the age of 96.

== Filmography ==
He was producer for all films unless otherwise noted.

=== Film ===
Year	Film	Credit	Notes	Ref.
1961	The Young Doctors			
1963	I Could Go On Singing			
1963	Stolen Hours	Executive producer		
1964	The Best Man			
1967	The Flim-Flam Man			
1967	The Graduate			
1968	Pretty Poison	Executive producer		
1970	The Great White Hope			
1971	The Marriage of a Young Stockbroker			
1974	The Nickel Ride	Executive producer		
1975	The Drowning Pool			
1977	First Love			
1977	Heroes			
1979	Walk Proud			
1981	Caveman			
1982	The Thing			
1983	Second Thoughts			
1984	Mass Appeal			
1985	The Mean Season			
1986	Short Circuit			
1986	Running Scared			
1988	Short Circuit 2			
1988	Full Moon in Blue Water			
1989	Gleaming the Cube			
1994	The Getaway			
1994	The River Wild			
1997	Booty Call	Executive producer		
1998	American History X	Executive producer		
2001	Kingdom Come	Executive producer		
2001	What's the Worst That Could Happen?			
2011	The Thing	Executive producer	Final film as a producer	

Miscellaneous crew

Year	Film	Role
1963	I Could Go On Singing	Presenter
1964	The Best Man	Presenter
1980	Tribute	Presenter

As director

Year	Film
1971	The Marriage of a Young Stockbroker
1983	Second Thoughts

=== Television ===
Year	Title	Credit	Notes
1969	The Flim-Flam Man	Executive producer	Television pilot
1973	She Lives!	Executive producer	Television film
1974	Get Christie Love!	Executive producer	Television film
1974	The Morning After	Executive producer	Television film
1974	Unwed Father	Executive producer	Television film
1982	Between Two Brothers	Executive producer	Television film
1982	The Gift of Life	Executive producer	Television film
1986	News at Eleven	Executive producer	Television film
1996	Pretty Poison	Executive producer	Television film
1998	The Long Way Home	Executive producer	Television film
2000	Miracle on the Mountain: The Kincaid Family Story	Executive producer	Television film

Miscellaneous crew

Year	Title	Role	Notes
1974	Savages	Creative consultant	Television film
