= Kathryn Walker =

American actress

- Born: Philadelphia, Pennsylvania, U.S.
- Education: Wells College
- Occupation: Actress
- Spouse: James Taylor (m. 1985; div. 1996)
- Partner: Douglas Kenney (1976–1980)

Kathryn Walker is an American theater, television, and film actress.

== Biography ==
Kathryn Walker was born in Philadelphia, Pennsylvania. She is a Phi Beta Kappa graduate of Wells College in Aurora, New York, and was a Fulbright Scholar in music and drama.

Walker's relationship with writer Douglas Kenney lasted until his death in 1980 at age 33. She was married to singer James Taylor from 1985 to 1996.

== Stage and film career ==
Walker's career began on the off-Broadway New York stage with her performance in Slag in 1971. On Broadway she appeared in The Good Doctor (1974), A Touch of the Poet (1977), Private Lives (1983), and Wild Honey (1986), among others. She has also been a sporadic presence on daytime drama, including Search for Tomorrow and Another World, and she received an Emmy award for her outstanding performance as First Lady Abigail Adams in PBS's 13-part epic miniseries The Adams Chronicles (1976). On film, she has co-starred or played secondary femme roles in Blade (1973), Slap Shot (1977), Girlfriends (1978), and Rich Kids (1979), and she also played John Belushi's wife in the oddball dark comedy Neighbors (1981). Walker also narrated two PBS reality series, Frontier House (2002) and Colonial House (2004), based on the format of experiential history.

She co-founded The Athens Street Company with William Alfred. In 1997, she was Rothschild Artist in Residence at Radcliffe College. Her six-part documentary series The Millennium Journal was shown on the PBS cable channel Metro Arts.

She has directed many of the 92nd Street Y's classical theater productions, among them Euripides' Hekabe (2004); Sophocles' Elektra (2002); Euripides' Medea (2001); The Bacchae of Euripides (2000); and her own adaptation of Fagles' The Iliad (2006). She lives in both New York City and Tesuque, New Mexico.

== Literary career ==
In 2008, her novel, A Stopover in Venice was published.

== In popular culture ==
Walker was portrayed in the film Burton & Taylor by Sarah Hadland, and by Emmy Rossum in the film A Futile and Stupid Gesture.

== Filmography ==
=== Film ===
Year	Title	Role	Notes
1973	Blade	Maggie	
1977	Slap Shot	Anita McCambridge	
1978	Girlfriends	Carpel's Receptionist	
1978	Mandy's Grandmother	Susan	Short
1979	Rich Kids	Madeline Philips	
1981	Neighbors	Enid Keese	
1985	D.A.R.Y.L.	Dr. Ellen Lamb	
1993	Emma and Elvis	Alice Winchek	

=== Television ===
Year	Title	Role	Notes
1972	Search for Tomorrow	Emily Rogers Hunter	1 episode
1972	Look Homeward, Angel	Helen Gant	TV film
1972	The House Without a Christmas Tree	Miss Thompson	TV film
1973	Rx for the Defense	Hilda Kempter	TV film
1973	The Thanksgiving Treasure	Miss Peggy Thompson	TV film
1974	All My Children	Eileen Littlejohn	TV series
1975	Another World	Barbara Weaver	TV series
1975	Beacon Hill	Fawn Lassiter	Main role
1976	Medical Center	Dr. Talley	"The Stranger"
1976	The Adams Chronicles	Abigail Smith Adams	TV miniseries
1978	The Winds of Kitty Hawk	Katharine Wright	TV film
1979	Too Far to Go	Marion	TV film
1979	3 by Cheever	Louise Bentley	"O Youth and Beauty!"
1980	F.D.R.: The Last Year	Anna	TV film
1981	A Whale for the Killing	Dr. Linda McFarland	TV film
1981	Family Reunion	Louisa King	TV film
1982	American Playhouse	Lena Brock	"Private Contentment"
1983	Special Bulletin	Susan Myles	TV film
1985	Private Sessions	Claire Braden	TV film
1986	Mrs. Delafield Wants to Marry	Sarah	TV film
1988	The Murder of Mary Phagan	Sally Slaton	TV miniseries
1990	Against the Law	Paulette Belinoff	"The Women"
2000	Suddenly Susan	Jenny	"Girls Night Out"
2002	Frontier House	Narrator	TV miniseries
2004	Colonial House	Narrator	TV miniseries
2006	Texas Ranch House	Additional narration	TV miniseries

== Broadway ==
- The Good Doctor (1973–1974)
- Mourning Pictures (1974)
- Kid Champion (1975) as Jill McDill
- A Touch of the Poet (1977–1978) as Sara Melody
- Private Lives (1983) as Amanda Prynne and, in other shows, as Sybil Chase
- Wild Honey (1986–1987) as Anna Petrovna
