= Home School (novel) =

2007 novel by Charles Webb

- First edition cover (UK)
- Author: Charles Webb
- Language: English
- Publisher: Random House
- Publication date: 2007
- Publication place: United States
- Media type: Print, e-book
- ISBN: 9780312376307
- Preceded by: The Graduate

Home School is a novel by Charles Webb that is the sequel to The Graduate. It was published by Random House in the United Kingdom in 2007.

== Background ==
In the 1970s, Webb himself had fought to have his boys homeschooled. The sequel was written about 40 years after the original book.

Webb completed writing the book around January 2005. Originally he stated that he would not have the entire book published while he remains alive, because Canal+ would have automatically had permission to produce a film based upon the book without seeking Webb's creative input.

However Webb arranged to have the book published after his financial situation had deteriorated; his family was facing the threat of eviction. Because of the situation, he could not continue negotiations over the book.

Random House published it in the United Kingdom. The book deal was worth £30,000 (US$56,000, €44,000). As part of the deal Random House was going to negotiate the sale of United States rights and other non-UK rights of the book. Because of this deal, Webb paid a French lawyer to check if he could retrieve the film rights.

On May 2, 2006 The Times published an extract from the book.

== Plot ==
In Home School, Benjamin "Ben" Braddock and Elaine, are now married and living in Westchester County, New York, set about a decade after the events in The Graduate. Ben works in a library, while Elaine is a stay-at-home parent. They live in a house willed to Elaine by her since-divorced, now-deceased father.

They are fighting with their school district to allow for their sons Jason and Matt to be homeschooled. They turn to Elaine's mother, Glenda Robinson, for assistance. Mrs. Robinson decides to help them by flying to New York from California, armed with the intent of seducing and blackmailing the principal. Webb stated that Ben chose to do homeschooling because he felt disenchanted with education, a message that was in the previous novel.

== Characters ==
- Benjamin "Ben" Braddock
- Elaine Braddock
- Jason and Matt – Ben and Elaine's sons. They were previously students of Hillside Elementary School but had been withdrawn by their parents.
- Glenda Robinson – She is nicknamed "Nan" instead of "Grandma".
- Mr. Claymore – A school principal who Mrs. Robinson blackmails.
- Garth and Goya – Hippies who homeschool their children. Both had been educated at Ivy League schools. Their children are Aaron and 7-year old Nefertiti. Nefertiti is still breastfeeding while Aaron had breastfed up to age 9.
- Frank Anello – The school district superintendent.
- Ralph Champion – The principal of Hillside Elementary School.

== Reception ==
David L. Ulin of the Los Angeles Times wrote that Ben, Elaine, and Mrs. Robinson "are just names, for the people here bear virtually no relation to the ones in The Graduate." Ulin also described the three in Home School as "flat and lifeless, caricatures with no heart." Ulin stated that Home School "is such a bad book on so many levels", a "failure", and that it was a book which does not give reasons for the readers to care about the characters. Ulin concluded, "After reading Home School I wish we'd never seen Benjamin and Elaine get off that bus."

Kirkus Reviews wrote that Home School is "A bit of fluff sure to satisfy those clamoring for a Graduate sequel."

Favorable reviews included those of Dennis Lythgoe, in Deseret News, describing the book as "very well-written and very funny". Jerry Dowlen, writing for Books Monthly, opined that "The story gives us two 'families from hell' who defiantly insist upon normalising their cranky lifestyles and behaviour. It's a recipe once again for bittersweet comedy and edgy tension."
