= Charles Webb (author) =

American writer (1939–2020)

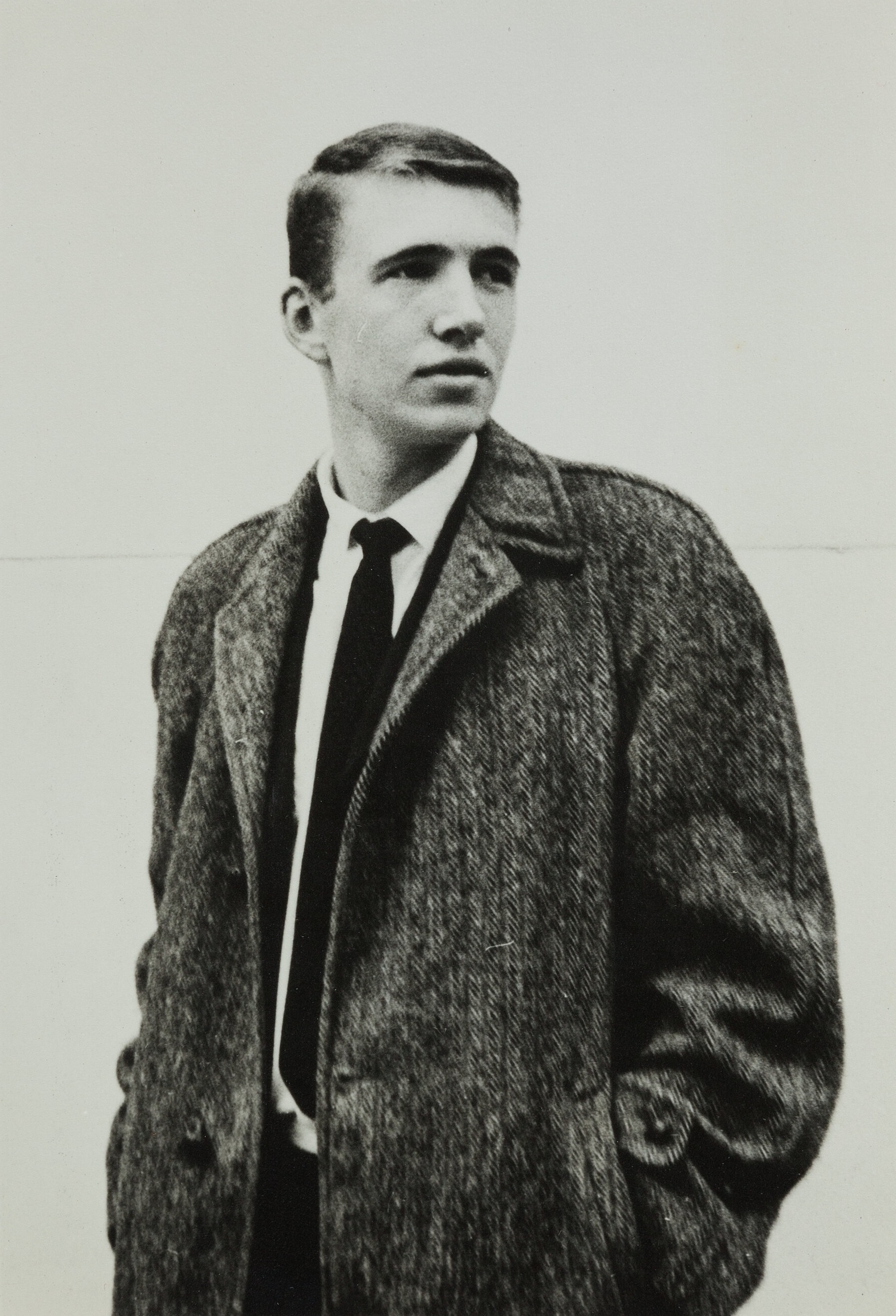
- Charles Webb in 1963.
- Born: Charles Richard Webb; June 9, 1939; San Francisco, California, U.S.
- Died: June 16, 2020 (aged 81); Eastbourne, East Sussex, England
- Education: Williams College
- Occupation: Novelist
- Spouses: Eve Rudd (m. 1962; div. 1981) (m. 2001; died 2019)
- Writing career
- Notable work: The Graduate

Charles Richard Webb (June 9, 1939 – June 16, 2020) was an American novelist. His most famous work is the 1963 novel The Graduate, which was made into a 1967 film of the same name.

== Life and career ==
Webb was born in San Francisco and grew up in Pasadena, California. He attended Chandler School, Midland School in Los Olivos, California, and graduated from Williams College in 1961. Webb lived for several years in Hastings-on-Hudson, New York.

Webb married Eve Rudd in 1962; they divorced in 1981 in protest at the institution of marriage, but remained a couple. They remarried in 2001 because of immigration rules, and remained together until her death in 2019. Eve shaved her head and called herself "Fred" in solidarity with a Californian support group called Fred, for men who have low self-esteem. Fred was an artist and her work included illustrations for Webb's 2002 novel New Cardiff. The couple had two sons, John and David; the latter is now a performance artist who once cooked and ate a copy of The Graduate with cranberry sauce, reportedly to his father's delight.

The Webbs removed their children from school so that they could tutor them at home. This was illegal in California and to evade the authorities they fled the state; at one point they managed a nudist camp in New Jersey. They also divorced – accounts vary as to why (it was not due to personal differences), either in protest against the institution of marriage, or against the United States' lack of marriage rights for gay people. They sold their wedding presents back to their guests, and having given away four houses in succession lived on the breadline, taking menial jobs as cleaners, cooks and fruit-pickers, working at K-Mart and living in a shack. They lived in Eastbourne, East Sussex, England.

Webb died in Eastbourne from a blood condition on June 16, 2020, a week after his 81st birthday.

== Non-materialist lifestyle ==
Webb lived a non-materialist life in what amounted to poverty for much of his life. He declined an inheritance from his father, a wealthy doctor. He sold the film rights to The Graduate for a token one-time payment of $20,000 and made nothing further, including from stage adaptions. Webb sold the movie rights to the screen adaptation for The Marriage of a Young Stockbroker and bought an 11-room mansion in Williamstown, Massachusetts, donating it to the Audubon Society after a few weeks and moving away from the college town where he began The Graduate. Webb donated the copyright of 'The Graduate' to the Anti-Defamation League. He and his wife donated most of their possessions including art by Robert Rauschenberg and Andy Warhol. They lived out of a VW Bus in campgrounds, trailer parks and nudist colonies working odd jobs while home-schooling their children.

== The Graduate ==
Webb's first and most famous novel was published in 1963, foreshadowing many of the social tensions of the 1960s which the book would come to represent. Through this novel, the character of "archetypal seductive older woman" Mrs. Robinson has found a permanent niche in American cultural history. The novel was made into the hugely successful film by Mike Nichols. Webb has stated that he never felt comfortable with the attention the film brought him because he felt it distracted from his status as a serious artist.

Webb sold the film rights for a payment reported to be $20,000. He was rarely associated with the film's publicity and not particularly with the growth of its reputation. Buck Henry and Calder Willingham, the screenwriters, assumed much of the credit for the work despite taking most of the dialogue directly from the book. During the film's enormous success, the producer, Joseph E. Levine, offered Webb token recognition by an additional compensation of $10,000.

In April 2006, it was reported that Webb had written a sequel to The Graduate, titled Home School but refused to publish it in its entirety because of a copyright loophole. When he sold the film rights to The Graduate in the 1960s, Webb also surrendered the film rights to any sequels. If he were to publish Home School, Canal+, the French media company that owns the rights to The Graduate, would be able to adapt it for the screen without his permission.

Extracts of Home School were printed in The Times on May 2, 2006. Webb also told the newspaper that there was a possibility he would find a publisher for the full text, provided he could retrieve the film rights using French intellectual property law.

At the same time as this news broke, Webb and his wife were also widely reported to be in such financial hardship that they were facing eviction from their home, owing rent of £1,600. Webb said to The Times that although his writing had proceeded, "the selling [of his books] hasn't" because he spends most of his time caring for Fred, who has been clinically depressed since suffering a nervous breakdown in 2001.

In May 2006, The Times reported that Webb had signed a publishing deal for Home School with Random House which would enable him to clear almost all his debts and instruct the French lawyers to attempt to retrieve his rights. On May 27, 2007, The Sunday Telegraph published a story that the novel was to be published in June 2007 and reported Webb having moved to Eastbourne. Home School was published by Hutchinson in June 2007. ISBN 978-0-09-179565-8 and by St. Martin's Press, January 2008, ISBN 978-0-312-37630-7.

== Other work ==
Among Webb's other work, the novel The Marriage of a Young Stockbroker was made into a feature film with Richard Benjamin and Joanna Shimkus, and his novel New Cardiff was made into a film titled Hope Springs. It was reported in 1992 by The Washington Post that Webb was working on a new book titled Lies. As of 2021, the existence of the book has not been confirmed.

== Novels ==
- The Graduate (1963)
- Love, Roger (1969)
- The Marriage of a Young Stockbroker (1970)
- Orphans and Other Children (1973)
- The Abolitionist of Clark Gable Place (1976)
- Elsinor (1977)
- Booze (1979)
- New Cardiff (2002)
- Home School (2007)
