= Thomas Berger =

American writer (1924–2014)

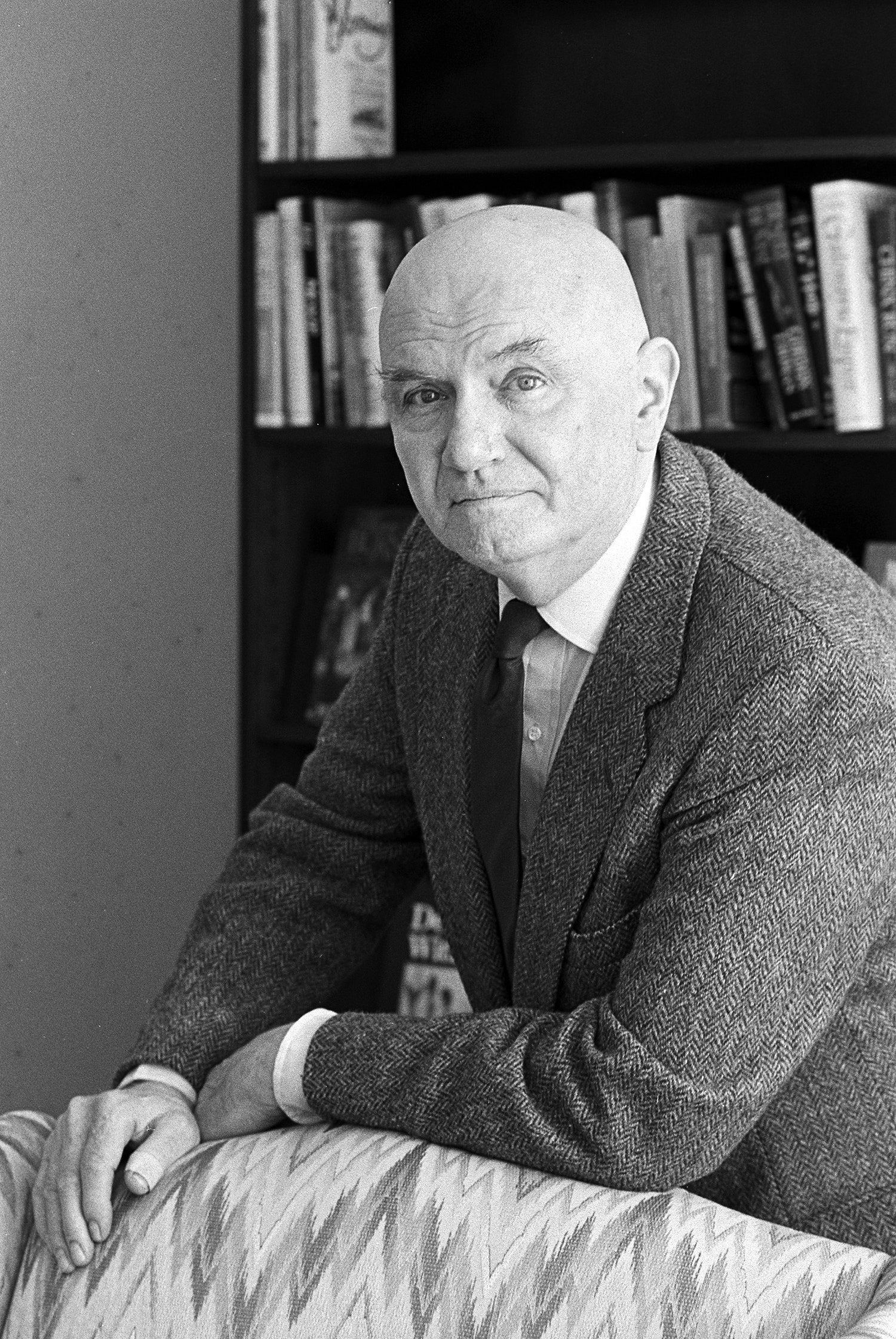
- Berger in 1987
- Born: Thomas Louis Berger; July 20, 1924; Cincinnati, Ohio, U.S.
- Died: July 13, 2014 (aged 89); Nyack, New York, U.S.
- Education: University of Cincinnati (BA); Columbia University; The New School
- Occupation: Novelist
- Spouse: Jeanne Redpath (m. 1950)
- Writing career
- Period: 1958–2014
- Genre: Literary fiction

Thomas Louis Berger (July 20, 1924 – July 13, 2014) was an American novelist. Probably best known for his picaresque novel Little Big Man and the subsequent film by Arthur Penn, Berger explored and manipulated many genres of fiction throughout his career, including the crime novel, the hard-boiled detective story, science fiction, the utopian novel, plus re-workings of classical mythology, Arthurian legend, and the survival adventure.

Berger's biting wit led many reviewers to refer to him as a satirist or "comic" novelist, descriptions he preferred to reject. His admirers often bemoaned that his talent and achievement were underappreciated, in view of his versatility across many forms of fiction, his precise use of language, and his probing intelligence.

== Biography ==
Born in Cincinnati, Ohio, Thomas Berger grew up in the nearby community of Lockland. He interrupted his college career to enlist in the United States Army in 1943. Berger served in Europe during World War II and was stationed with a medical unit in the first U.S. Occupation Forces in Berlin, experiences which later provided him with background for his first novel, Crazy in Berlin, published in 1958. On his return, he studied at the University of Cincinnati, receiving a B.A. in 1948. He then pursued graduate work in English at Columbia University, leaving his thesis unfinished to enroll in the writer's workshop at the New School for Social Research. Here Berger met and married an artist, Jeanne Redpath, in 1950. He supported himself during this time by working as a librarian at the Rand School of Social Science, and was briefly on staff at the New York Times Index. Berger later became a copy editor at Popular Science Monthly, and performed freelance editing during the early years of his writing career.

Eventually, Berger was able to devote himself to writing full-time, particularly after the notoriety gained by his third book, Little Big Man, in 1964. Although he would occasionally put his hand to a short story, play, or non-fiction article (including a stint as film critic for Esquire), Berger preferred the long narrative form of the novel, and produced a steady run of critically acclaimed books throughout his career. In 1984 his book The Feud was nominated by the Pulitzer committee for fiction for the Pulitzer Prize, but the Pulitzer board overrode their recommendation and instead chose William Kennedy's Ironweed.

In 1974, Berger was a writer in residence at the University of Kansas, and a distinguished visiting professor at Southampton College in 1975–1976. He lectured at Yale University in 1981 and 1982, and was a Regents' Lecturer at the University of California, Davis, in 1982. A collection of his papers is available at the Howard Gotlieb Archival Research Center at Boston University.

Berger resided in New York City from 1948 to 1953, and lived the next twelve years in a town on the Hudson River. In subsequent years, he lived in London, Malibu, California, New York City again, Long Island, and then Mount Desert Island in Maine, before once more returning to the banks of the Hudson. He died on July 13, 2014, seven days before his 90th birthday.

== Awards and honors ==
Berger received a Dial fellowship in 1962. In 1965, he received a Richard and Hinda Rosenthal Award, National Institute of Arts and Letters, and a Western Heritage Award, both for Little Big Man. Reinhart's Women won Berger an Ohioana Book Award, and he was a 1984 Pulitzer Prize finalist for The Feud. Long Island University awarded Berger a Litt. D. in 1986.

== Adaptations ==
Berger may be best known for Little Big Man, the movie made from his 1964 novel. Released in 1970, it was directed by Arthur Penn, and starred Dustin Hoffman and Faye Dunaway. Neighbors, with John Belushi, Dan Aykroyd and Cathy Moriarty, was released in 1981. Bill D'Elia produced and directed a film adaptation of The Feud in 1989. A film version of the 1992 novel Meeting Evil, starring Samuel L. Jackson and Luke Wilson, was filmed in 2011, and was released to theaters in the United States in May 2012.

His play Other People was produced at the Berkshire Theatre Festival in 1970. Berger's radio play At the Dentist's was broadcast by Vermont Public Radio in 1981.

== Works ==
=== Novels ===
- Crazy in Berlin (1958) Carlo Reinhart #1
- Reinhart in Love (1962) Carlo Reinhart #2
- Little Big Man (1964) Jack Crabb #1
- Killing Time (1967)
- Vital Parts (1970) Carlo Reinhart #3
- Regiment of Women (1973)
- Sneaky People (1975)
- Who is Teddy Villanova? (1977)
- Arthur Rex: A Legendary Novel (1978)
- Neighbors (1980)
- Reinhart's Women (1981) Carlo Reinhart #4
- The Feud (1983)
- Nowhere (1985)
- Being Invisible (1987)
- The Houseguest (1988)
- Changing the Past (1989)
- Orrie's Story (1990)
- Meeting Evil (1992)
- Robert Crews (1994)
- Suspects (1996)
- The Return of Little Big Man (1999) Jack Crabb #2
- Best Friends (2003)
- Adventures of the Artificial Woman (2004)

=== Stories ===
- Granted Wishes: Three Stories (1984)
- Previously uncollected short stories have appeared in magazines such as American Review, Gentleman's Quarterly, Saturday Evening Post, Playboy, and Harper's.
- Abnormal Occurrences: Short Stories (e-book published March 2013)

=== Plays ===
- Other People (1970)
- Rex, Rita, and Roger (1970)
- The Siamese Twins (1971)
- At the Dentist's (radio play) (1981)
- The Burglars (1988)

== Further reading and critical studies ==
- Bancroft, Collette. Thomas Berger, Author of 'Little Big Man,' Had Distinctive Voice. Tampa Bay Times, July 28, 2014 (obituary).
- Barra, Allen. Thomas Berger, Author of 'Little Big Man' Passes. True West Magazine, July 24, 2014 (obituary).
- Giardina, Henry. Thomas Berger's Egoless Fictions. The New Yorker, July 30, 2014.
- Landon, Brooks. "A Secret Too Good to Keep" and "Thomas Berger: Dedicated to the Novel," World & I, October 2003.
- Landon, Brooks. "The Radical Americanist," The Nation, August 20, 1977.
- Landon, Brooks. Thomas Berger: A Celebration. Los Angeles Review of Books, July 25, 2014.
- Landon, Brooks. Understanding Thomas Berger, University of South Carolina Press, 2009.
- Lehmann-Haupt, Christopher and William McDonald. Thomas Berger, 'Little Big Man' Author, Is Dead at 89. The New York Times, July 21, 2014 (obituary).
- Lethem, Jonathan. "Ambivalent Usurpations," in The Ecstasy of Influence, Doubleday, 2011.
- Lethem, Jonathan. "Fan Mail," The New York Times Book Review, April 8, 2012.
- Malone, Michael. "American Literature's Little Big Man," The Nation, May 3, 1980.
- Ruud, Jay. "Thomas Berger's Arthur Rex: Galahad and Earthly Power," Critique, Winter 1984.
- Schickel, Richard. "Bitter Comedy," Commentary, July 1970.
- Schickel, Richard. "Interviewing Thomas Berger," The New York Times Book Review, April 6, 1980.
- Trachtenberg, Stanley. "Berger and Barth: the Comedy of 'Decomposition'," in Comic Relief, University of Illinois Press, 1978. Edited by Sarah B. Cohen.
- Turner, Frederick. "Melville and Thomas Berger: The Novelist as Cultural Anthropologist," Centennial Review, Winter 1969.
- Turner, Frederick. "The Second Decade of 'Little Big Man'," The Nation, August 20, 1977.
- Ward, Andrew. "Little Big Man's Man," interview in American Heritage, May/June 1999.
