= The Graduate (novel) =

1963 novella by Charles Webb

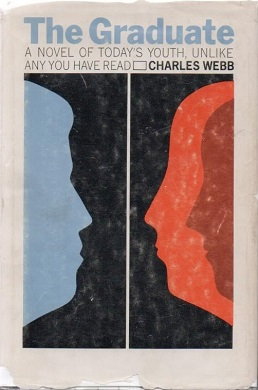
- First edition cover
- Author: Charles Webb
- Language: English
- Publisher: New American Library (U.S.); Constable (U.K.)
- Publication date: 1963
- Publication place: United States
- Media type: Print
- Pages: 238
- ISBN: 0743456459
- LC Class: PS3573.E195
- Followed by: Home School

The Graduate is a 1963 novella by Charles Webb, who wrote it shortly after graduating from Williams College. It tells the story of Benjamin Braddock, who, while pondering his future after his graduation, has an affair with the older Mrs. Robinson, the wife of his father's business partner, before falling in love with their daughter, Elaine.

The novella was adapted into the highly successful, iconic, 1967 Oscar-winning film of the same name, directed by Mike Nichols, with Dustin Hoffman in the title role and Anne Bancroft as Mrs. Robinson. Webb has stated he never felt comfortable with the attention the film brought him because he felt it distracted from his status as a serious artist. He did not receive any royalties from the film and has stated he is glad it happened that way.

On the episode of the AMC television series Movies That Shook the World, devoted to the film adaptation, Webb revealed the identity of the real-life inspiration for Mrs. Robinson: Jane Ericson (spelling approximate), the wife of an associate of Webb's father. That was the extent of any similarity with the novel; Webb denied having a relationship with her. A sequel titled Home School, which takes place ten years after the ending of the first novel, was published by Hutchinson in June 2007.

== Plot ==
Benjamin Braddock has recently graduated from a small Eastern college and has returned home to a suburb of Los Angeles. Benjamin, visibly uncomfortable as his parents deliver accolades and neighborhood friends ask him about his plans, evades those who try to congratulate him. Mrs. Robinson enters his room, asking him strange questions and probing into his life. After he drives her home, Mrs. Robinson attempts to seduce him. Benjamin rebuffs her and quickly goes downstairs as he hears Mr. Robinson arriving home.

A week after his 21st birthday, Benjamin begins his affair with Mrs. Robinson and meets her at the Taft Hotel. In mid-September, Benjamin spends the time drifting around in the pool by day, purposefully neglecting to select a graduate school, and seeing Mrs. Robinson at the hotel by night. One evening, Mrs. Robinson reveals that she is in a loveless marriage, because in the 1940s, she became pregnant with her daughter, Elaine, dropped out of college, and married to avoid scandal.

After being increasingly pressured by his parents and Mr. Robinson to go on a date with Elaine, he takes her out but deliberately sabotages the date by driving recklessly and taking her to two clubs and a strip show. Benjamin discovers that he likes Elaine and decides to tell her everything. Elaine is furious and returns to Berkeley where she is a student.

Several months later, Benjamin goes to Berkeley and moves into a rooming house near Elaine's dormitory. Elaine is uneasy in his presence and tells him that she has started dating Carl Smith, a medical student. Elaine accuses him of taking advantage of her mother's drunken state and raping her, refusing to believe that it was her mother who initiated the affair. Elaine eventually realizes that her mother was lying, and makes Benjamin promise to not leave Berkeley until he has definite plans.

When Benjamin proposes marriage, Elaine says she is concerned about graduating from college and her relationship with her parents if she continues to see him. Benjamin receives a telegram from Mrs. Robinson, telling him to get out of town immediately. Mr. Robinson arrives at the college and tells Benjamin that he is divorcing his wife and terminating his partnership with Mr. Braddock. Robinson forces his daughter to drop out of school and takes her away, warning Benjamin against further contact. Benjamin returns to his hometown and sneaks into the Robinsons' home but encounters both Mr. and Mrs. Robinson, who call the police and claim that a man has broken into their house. He escapes from the house and returns to Berkeley to find Elaine.

In San Francisco, he learns that Carl will marry Elaine that very morning. Benjamin takes a plane to Santa Barbara, finds the church, and interrupts the ceremony. He runs downstairs to the sanctuary, punches Mr. Robinson, and fights Carl off using a cross as a weapon. Together, Benjamin and Elaine flee the church and ride off on the nearest bus to elope.

== Sequel ==
In Home School, Ben and Elaine, now married and living in Westchester County, are fighting to allow for their child to be homeschooled. They turn to Mrs. Robinson to help them. The novel is set in the 1970s. In real life, Webb had fought to have his boys homeschooled. The poorly received sequel was written about forty years after the original book.
