= Pasta (The Bear) =

- The Bear episode
- Episode no.: Season 2 Episode 2
- Directed by: Christopher Storer
- Written by: Joanna Calo
- Cinematography by: Andrew Wehde
- Editing by: Joanna Naugle
- Production code: XCBV2002
- Original release date: June 22, 2023
- Running time: 30 minutes

Guest appearances
- Edwin Lee Gibson as Ebraheim; Robert Townsend as Emmanuel Adamu; Molly Gordon as Claire; Corey Hendrix as Gary "Sweeps" Woods; José Cervantes as Angel; Richard Esteras as Manny

Episode chronology
← Previous "Beef"	Next → "Sundae"
- The Bear season 2

"Pasta" is the second episode of the second season of the American television comedy-drama The Bear. It is the 10th overall episode of the series and was written by executive producer Joanna Calo and directed by series creator Christopher Storer. It was released on Hulu on June 22, 2023, along with the rest of the season.

The series follows Carmen "Carmy" Berzatto, an award-winning New York City chef de cuisine, who returns to his hometown of Chicago to run his late brother Michael's failing Italian beef sandwich shop. In the episode, Carmy and Sydney begin working on the menu, while a mold problem appears in the restaurant.

The episode received highly positive reviews from critics, who praised the performances, character development and emotional tone.

== Plot ==
With 12 weeks left to open, the staff faces some problems during the renovation. Sydney (Ayo Edebiri) tells Tina (Liza Colón-Zayas) and Ebraheim (Edwin Lee Gibson) that they will be sent to a culinary school to learn more for their upcoming opening. Tina is delighted, although Ebraheim is scared over the idea.

Carmy (Jeremy Allen White) and Sydney go to his apartment to design the menus, choosing to showcase "chaos menu but thoughtful." Back at the restaurant, Richie (Ebon Moss-Bachrach) and Fak (Matty Matheson) start moving lockers to accommodate the area, and Carmy has to break open Mikey's locker, which contains a cap. To complicate matters, Sugar (Abby Elliott) informs them that mold has been discovered, adding even more expenses to the solution. Alone, Sugar reveals her pregnancy, but she does not tell anyone given the circumstances.

Sydney later has dinner with her father, Emmanuel (Robert Townsend). Their conversation reveals that Sydney's mother died, and that Sydney is even older than her when she died. Emmanuel offers her a job with a family member, as he is unsure of her future in the restaurant. At a grocery store, Carmy runs into his childhood friend Claire (Molly Gordon), now a resident in emergency medicine. Carmy is even surprised when Claire knows the restaurant's name. Despite the encounter, Carmy gives her a fake phone number.

== Reception ==
=== Critical reviews ===
"Pasta" received highly positive reviews from critics. Marah Eakin of Vulture gave the episode a 4 star out of 5 rating and wrote, "With only 12 weeks to open, the team behind the Bear (the restaurant) is chugging right along on The Bear (the show). In “Pasta,” the series' writers shift the focus from table-setting and plot to emotion and introspection, and it works out well. The only way this crew can ever really succeed is if they get their own individual shit to a good place — maybe not a perfect place, because we are talking about The Bear here, but at least a better one."

A. J. Daulerio of Decider wrote, "Claire looks at him longingly. 'So, how's your life been, Berzatto?' she asks. Carmy has no answer for her. This is gonna get complicated." Arnav Srivastava of The Review Geek gave the episode a 4 star rating out of 5 and wrote, "Season 2 has thrown different kinds of tensions and conceits at us until now. The change of substance hasn't affected its impact though, and that’s quite an achievement on the part of the show’s creators." Karl De Mesa from Show Snob wrote, "I swear the breathing space in the writing to develop characters is what sets this series apart from your usual cuisine shows. Whether it's chaos or complex human dynamics, what a bravura episode."

Rafa Boladeras of MovieWeb named the episode as the weakest of the season, writing "The objective to get the restaurant ready in 12 weeks has already started, but this episode is all about its characters. We learn a lot more about Sydney and her family, Carmy opens up about his experiences in three-star Michelin restaurants while deciding what their “chaos menu, but thoughtful” means, and the restaurant has mold." Jasmine Blu of TV Fanatic named the episode as the eighth best of the season, writing "'Pasta' was another strong installment for Sydney, particularly with the introduction of her father, played by the iconic Robert Townsend. For a character puzzlingly polarizing to the audience sometimes, season two's soft glimpses into what makes her tick outside the kitchen have proven to be one of the strengths."

== Sources ==
- Smith, Scott D. (Fall 2025). "The Bear: The Challenges of Managing Kitchen Chaos". Production Sound & Video. 17 (4). North Hollywood, California: IATSE 695: 32–37.
