= Children (The Bear) =

- The Bear episode
- Episode no.: Season 3 Episode 5
- Directed by: Christopher Storer
- Written by: Christopher Storer
- Cinematography by: Andrew Wehde
- Editing by: Adam Epstein; Joanna Naugle
- Production code: XCBV3005
- Original air date: June 26, 2024
- Running time: 35 minutes

Guest appearances
- Oliver Platt as Jimmy "Cicero" Kalinowski; John Cena as Sammy Fak; Edwin Lee Gibson as Ebraheim; Ricky Staffieri as Theodore Fak; Sarah Ramos as Jessica; Corey Hendrix as Gary "Sweeps" Woods; Brian Koppelman as Nicholas "The Computer" Marshall; Richard Esteras as Manny; José Cervantes as Angel; Pat Whalen as Tribune photographer

Episode chronology
| ← Previous "Violet" | Next → "Napkins" |
- The Bear season 3

"Children" is the fifth episode of the third season of the American television comedy-drama The Bear. It is the 23rd overall episode of the series and was written and directed by series creator Christopher Storer. It was released on Hulu on June 26, 2024, along with the rest of the season.

The series follows Carmen "Carmy" Berzatto, an award-winning New York City chef de cuisine, who returns to his hometown of Chicago to run his late brother Michael's failing Italian beef sandwich shop. In the episode, The Bear staff prepares to welcome a Tribune photographer as they await for the review, while Carmy and Richie are surprised by the news that Chef Terry will shutter her acclaimed restaurant, Ever.

John Cena's guest-star role as Sammy Fak was widely criticized as a disappointing and alienating stunt-cast that disrupted the typically immersive experience of The Bear.

== Plot ==
Sydney (Ayo Edebiri) helps Marcus (Lionel Boyce) in clearing out his mother's house. Chef Will Guidara, co-founder of Eleven Madison Park, where Carmy (Jeremy Allen White) once worked in New York, shares a news article reporting that Chef Terry has announced the closure of Ever after a dozen years.

To help the restaurant, Cicero (Oliver Platt) brings in a friend, Nicholas "The Computer" Marshall (Brian Koppelman), an accountant, to check on the costs and offer some possible cuts. The Computer suggests reducing the amount of meals while also adding one more day to the restaurant's schedule. He and Cicero also state that another possible way to cut costs is to fire Marcus, as the restaurant does not really need a pastry chef. Natalie (Abby Elliott) immediately shuts down the suggestion.

With just one hour before the Chicago Tribune reporter shows up to photograph the restaurant for the review, the team must quickly organize. Fak (Matty Matheson) and Theodore (Ricky Staffieri) are joined by their brother Sammy (John Cena) as they buff the floors. Sammy gets into an argument with Theodore for stealing his SD cards, and Richie tries to get the brothers under control. When the photographer arrives, the staff struggle to prepare a duck dish mentioned in the review, whose ingredients they do not have on hand due to the daily menu changes. Carmy goes to the basement, where he opens a box containing a notebook. It includes photos of Donna and Michael, Donna, and a baby Sugar, and a close up of young Carmy watching curiously.

== Production ==
=== Development ===
In May 2024, Hulu confirmed that the fifth episode of the season would be titled "Children", and was to be written and directed by series creator Christopher Storer. It was Storer's 12th writing credit and 16th directing credit.

=== Casting ===
The episode features a guest appearance by John Cena, who plays Sammy Fak. According to Matty Matheson, "He was a pro. Showed up, didn't even look at a script, just was fully prepared. Genuinely very inspiring, like, that's how I want to show up on another set."

=== Filming ===
According to cinematographer Andrew Wehde, the opening scenes were shot with intent of conveying Natalie Berzatto's internal emotional state to the viewer: "You start off with Sugar in the church, and you have that beautiful light coming from behind her, which goes to her waking up and the silhouette in the kitchen and all the blue. It's like we're doing these vignettes of their inner lives."

=== Music ===
Songs featured on the soundtrack of the episode include "Dream Little One, Dream" by Walter Schumann and Charles Laughton, "Purple Heather" by Van Morrison, an instrumental section of the Eddie Vedder cover of "Save It for Later," and "Mixed Emotions" by the Rolling Stones.

== Reception ==
=== Critical reviews ===
Jenna Scherer of The A.V. Club gave the episode a "B–" grade and wrote, "I've gone on record as a hardcore stan of the Fak bros. This season in particular, Neil and Ted have been adding much-needed belly laughs to even the most serious, somber episodes. But in this installment—and I really hate to say it—I officially hit the upper limit of my Fak tolerance."

Marah Eakin of Vulture gave the episode a 2 star out of 5 rating and wrote, "When you see Carmy digging through a box of photos in the basement labeled “DD,” you just know something's coming soon in the pipeline." A.J. Daulerio of Decider wrote, "This show is fully capable and, at times, excellent at showing the dark tunnels grief can create. And it's not just grief for the dead—it's the grief for the living that can feel the most impossible, the most volatile." Brady Langmann of Esquire wrote, "I'm not ready for Sydney to split from Carmy. Really, all I want is to see season 1 of Matter of Fak drop before the next episodes of The Bear."

Critics reacted negatively to John Cena's guest appearance. The Washington Post considered his appearance "distracting" arguing that "Wrestling fans like me will always be distracted by seeing the 16-time world champion on the screen, particularly when his character is so very, very Cena-like." Ben Travers of IndieWire wrote, "Cena is just...too polished for this clan of charmingly schlubby Chicagoans." Vulture wrote, "there was never a moment when he was onscreen in this episode that I believed that was Sammy Fak." The A.V. Club wrote, "he's got great chemistry with his costars. But the vibe is all wrong, and not just because he doesn't look like a Fak boy. It seems like Storer was so eager to write for Cena that he accidentally let Sammy completely dominate the episode." Alan Sepinwall wrote, "When past episodes brought in notable guest stars like Bob Odenkirk or John Mulaney, they instantly felt like people in this world; Cena's the first one to play as stunt casting."
