= The Bear season 2 =

Season of television series

The Bear
- Season 2
- Promotional poster
- Showrunners: Christopher Storer; Joanna Calo
- Starring: Jeremy Allen White; Ebon Moss-Bachrach; Ayo Edebiri; Lionel Boyce; Abby Elliott; Matty Matheson; Liza Colón-Zayas
- No. of episodes: 10

Release
- Original network: FX on Hulu
- Original release: June 22, 2023

Season chronology
- ← Previous; Season 1 Next → Season 3

The second season of the American comedy-drama television series The Bear premiered with all episodes on June 22, 2023, on FX on Hulu. Christopher Storer and Joanna Calo serve as showrunners for the season. FX renewed the series for a ten-episode second season in July 2022. Jeremy Allen White stars as Carmy Berzatto, an award-winning chef who returns to his hometown of Chicago to manage the chaotic kitchen at his deceased brother's sandwich shop.

Ebon Moss-Bachrach, Ayo Edebiri, Lionel Boyce, Abby Elliott, and Liza Colón-Zayas return from the previous season as the supporting cast, with Matty Matheson promoted to a series regular. In July 2022, following the release of the first season, FX renewed The Bear for a second season, which began filming in February 2023 in Chicago, and wrapped in April of that year. The season consists of ten episodes.

The season received widespread critical acclaim, with many reviewers considering it an improvement over the first. It received eleven Primetime Emmy Awards wins from 23 nominations, making it the season of television with the most wins in a single year for a comedy series until the record was beaten by the series' second season. The Emmy wins included acting wins for White, Moss-Bachrach and Colón-Zayas, and for guest stars Jon Bernthal and Jamie Lee Curtis.

== Cast and characters ==
=== Main ===
- Jeremy Allen White as Carmen "Carmy" Berzatto
- Ebon Moss-Bachrach as Richard "Richie" Jerimovich
- Ayo Edebiri as Sydney Adamu
- Lionel Boyce as Marcus Brooks
- Abby Elliott as Natalie "Sugar" Berzatto
- Matty Matheson as Neil Fak
- Liza Colón-Zayas as Tina Marrero

=== Recurring ===
- Jon Bernthal as Michael "Mikey" Berzatto
- Joel McHale as David Fields
- Edwin Lee Gibson as Ebraheim
- Corey Hendrix as Gary "Sweeps" Woods
- Oliver Platt as Jimmy "Cicero" Kalinowski
- Richard Esteras as Manny
- Chris Witaske as Pete
- Molly Gordon as Claire Dunlap
- Robert Townsend as Emmanuel Adamu
- Alex Moffat as Josh
- Ricky Staffieri as Theodore "Teddy" Fak
- Jack Lancaster as Connor
- Isa Arciniegas as Daniela

=== Guest ===
- Adam Shapiro as Adam Shapiro
- Carmen Christopher as Chester
- Gillian Jacobs as Tiffany "Tiff" Jerimovich
- Mitra Jouhari as Kelly
- Annabelle Toomey as Evie Jerimovich
- Will Poulter as Luca
- Jamie Lee Curtis as Donna Berzatto
- Olivia Colman as Chef Andrea Terry
- Sarah Ramos as Jessica
- Andrew Lopez as Garrett
- Rene Gube as Rene, the general manager of Ever
- Maura Kidwell as Carol
- Bob Odenkirk as "Uncle" Lee Lane
- Sarah Paulson as Michelle Berzatto
- John Mulaney as Stevie

== Episodes ==
No. overall	No. in season	Title	Directed by	Written by	Original release date	Prod. code
9	1	"Beef"	Christopher Storer	Christopher Storer	June 22, 2023	XCBV2001
Carmy and Sydney begin to develop a menu for The Bear and bring in Natalie as project manager for renovations. Needing more funds, they ask Cicero for an additional $500,000 loan. He agrees under the condition that if the loan is not paid back in 18 months, he takes ownership of the property, estimated to be worth $2 million. Sydney asks Tina to be her sous-chef, to the latter's delight. Carmy, Sugar and Sydney plan to open the restaurant in three months.
10	2	"Pasta"	Christopher Storer	Joanna Calo	June 22, 2023	XCBV2002
Construction delays occur, including the discovery of a mold problem. Sydney has dinner with her father, who expresses his concerns about her choice to open a restaurant. Sydney sends Tina and Ebra to culinary school. Meanwhile, Carmy reconnects with his childhood friend Claire, now a resident in emergency medicine, but intentionally gives her a wrong phone number.
11	3	"Sundae"	Joanna Calo	Karen Joseph Adcock & Catherine Schetina	June 22, 2023	XCBV2003
Carmy continues to attend Al-Anon meetings, where he discusses his struggle to find time for leisure and enjoyment. He and Sydney prepare their menu, but realize they have to get out of their routine and sample food at other restaurants. Claire gets Carmy's real number via Fak, and asks Carmy to help her pack up her mother's house. Carmy subsequently bails on his plans with Sydney, so she goes to restaurants around the city to sample dishes. Gathering inspiration, she also receives feedback from a former colleague, who stresses the importance of having a business partner she can trust. Sydney returns to The Bear and becomes upset when she discovers Carmy has been making large decisions without consulting her.
12	4	"Honeydew"	Ramy Youssef	Stacy Osei-Kuffour	June 22, 2023	XCBV2004
Two months before the planned opening, Natalie tells Carmy she is pregnant. Sydney begins screening new employees while Richie and Fak continue construction. Marcus begins to develop three unique desserts, and temporarily leaves his terminally ill mother to travel to Copenhagen to learn from a skilled pastry chef named Luca, and the two quickly become friends. The trip leaves Marcus inspired, while he also develops feelings for Sydney.
13	5	"Pop"	Joanna Calo	Sofya Levitsky-Weitz	June 22, 2023	XCBV2005
Sydney continues developing the menu with help from Tina, who is thriving in culinary school, although Tina is troubled when Ebra stops attending. Natalie convinces Cicero to expedite permit applications. Claire accompanies Carmy to drop off a liquor license application, where the pair bond. She convinces him to accompany her to a party, where Carmy realizes Claire represents the release and enjoyment he has been searching for. After the party, Carmy takes Claire to see the restaurant, walking in on an argument about Richie stealing electricity from a neighboring building. When the restaurant clears, Carmy and Claire share their first kiss.
14	6	"Fishes"	Christopher Storer	Joanna Calo & Christopher Storer	June 22, 2023	XCBV2006
Approximately five years before The Bear is set to open, Carmy returns from Copenhagen to spend Christmas with his family. Michael and Carmy warn Natalie not to ask their volatile mother Donna if she is "okay." Donna drunkenly prepares a meal based on the Feast of the Seven Fishes. Carmy's cousin Michelle encourages him to stay with her in New York to pursue his career, noticing how the family's dysfunction weighs on him. As they await dinner, an intoxicated Michael repeatedly throws forks at Donna's on-and-off boyfriend Lee, whom he resents for considering him a failure. Ignoring her brothers' warning, Natalie asks an upset Donna if she is okay, leading Donna to have an emotional outburst. Michael throws another fork at Lee when he scorns Donna's behavior and a fight nearly occurs, only to be interrupted when Donna crashes her car into the house.
15	7	"Forks"	Christopher Storer	Alex Russell	June 22, 2023	XCBV2007
Richie is sent by Carmy to Ever, an upscale fine dining restaurant, for the week as education. Richie is deeply skeptical of the restaurant and annoyed by having to wake up before dawn to meticulously clean forks. After seeing how dedicated the restaurant's staff are to their customers he has a change of heart, becoming enthusiastic and learning to expedite a busy dinner service. At the end of the week Richie is sad to leave and asks about staying on permanently, believing that Carmy is trying to get rid of him. He meets the owner, Terry, who recounts the origins of the restaurant and how she overcame professional setbacks. Terry reveals that Carmy told her that he believes in Richie and his people skills.
16	8	"Bolognese"	Christopher Storer	Rene Gube	June 22, 2023	XCBV2008
Ten days before opening, Carmy and Sydney are panicking over their inability to pass the fire suppression test. Ebra returns, reconciles with Tina, and agrees to take over the restaurant's takeout sandwich window. Richie returns with a newfound sense of purpose, while Marcus returns from Copenhagen with an impressive new dessert menu. Richie apologizes to Natalie for the way he has treated her, and they begin interviewing front-of-house candidates. Sydney begins to see Claire as a threat to Carmy's focus. Fak realizes that Michael disabled the fire suppression system when he tried to commit insurance fraud by burning down the restaurant. Fak fixes it in time for the test and they pass, allowing the restaurant to open. Carmy, realizing he loves Claire, makes her dinner.
17	9	"Omelette"	Christopher Storer	Joanna Calo & Christopher Storer	June 22, 2023	XCBV2009
The Bear is set for its soft opening, for family and friends only. Sydney feels pressured to impress her father. Carmy begins to second-guess the plans and forgets to have the handle of the walk-in refrigerator replaced. Natalie informs Carmy that she has invited their mother. Richie and Natalie see the restaurant is fully booked for two weeks, but need to increase reservations to stay profitable. Cicero delivers the official business license to Carmy, and warns him about the danger of distraction. Carmy apologizes to Sydney for his lack of focus, and gives her a custom chef's coat. With the team prepared and the restaurant ready to launch, the team opens The Bear for business.
18	10	"The Bear"	Christopher Storer	Kelly Galuska	June 22, 2023	XCBV2010
On family and friends night, Richie runs the front of house while Sydney runs the kitchen. Things start out smooth but quickly begin to go wrong; forks run out, a line cook disappears leaving Sydney and Marcus having to assist, and Carmy is trapped inside the walk-in refrigerator when the handle breaks. Pete sees Donna outside, who refuses to go in due to feeling undeserving of seeing her children's success. Pete accidentally reveals Natalie's pregnancy to Donna before she leaves. Trapped in the fridge, Carmy spirals into self-loathing and rants about how his relationship with Claire has ruined his focus on The Bear. Claire overhears him and leaves in tears, which Richie sees, and he has heated argument with Carmy through the refrigerator door. Carmy plays a missed voicemail from Claire earlier in the day, in which she confesses her love for him, and is devastated. Sydney has a panic attack and runs outside to vomit, but finds her dad, who comforts her by expressing his pride in her. Marcus misses several calls from his mother's caretaker as he receives a gift from Luca in Copenhagen.

== Production ==
=== Development ===
In July 2022, following the release and positive reception of the first season, FX renewed The Bear for a ten-episode second season, with Christopher Storer and Joanna Calo returning as showrunners.

=== Casting ===
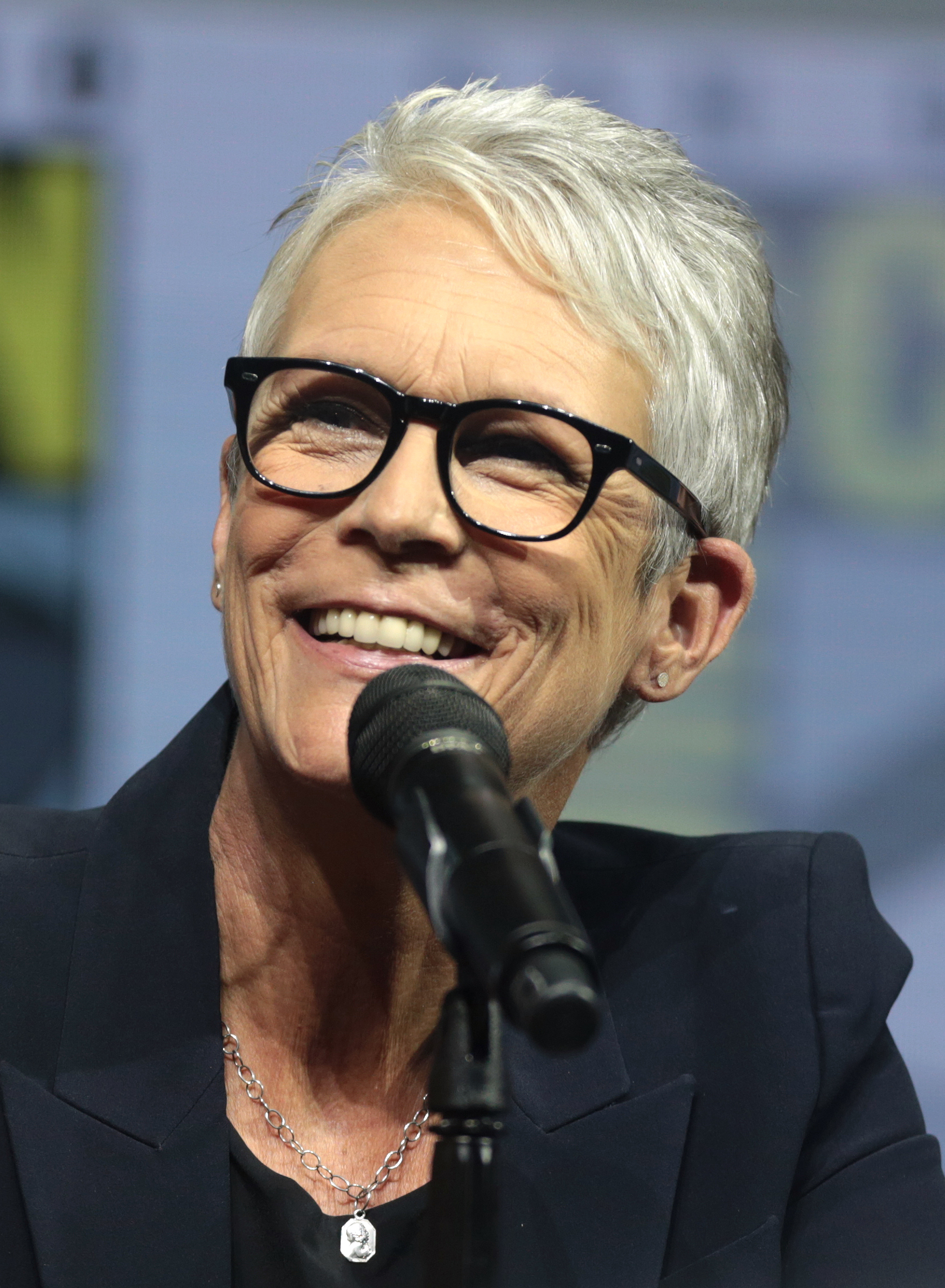
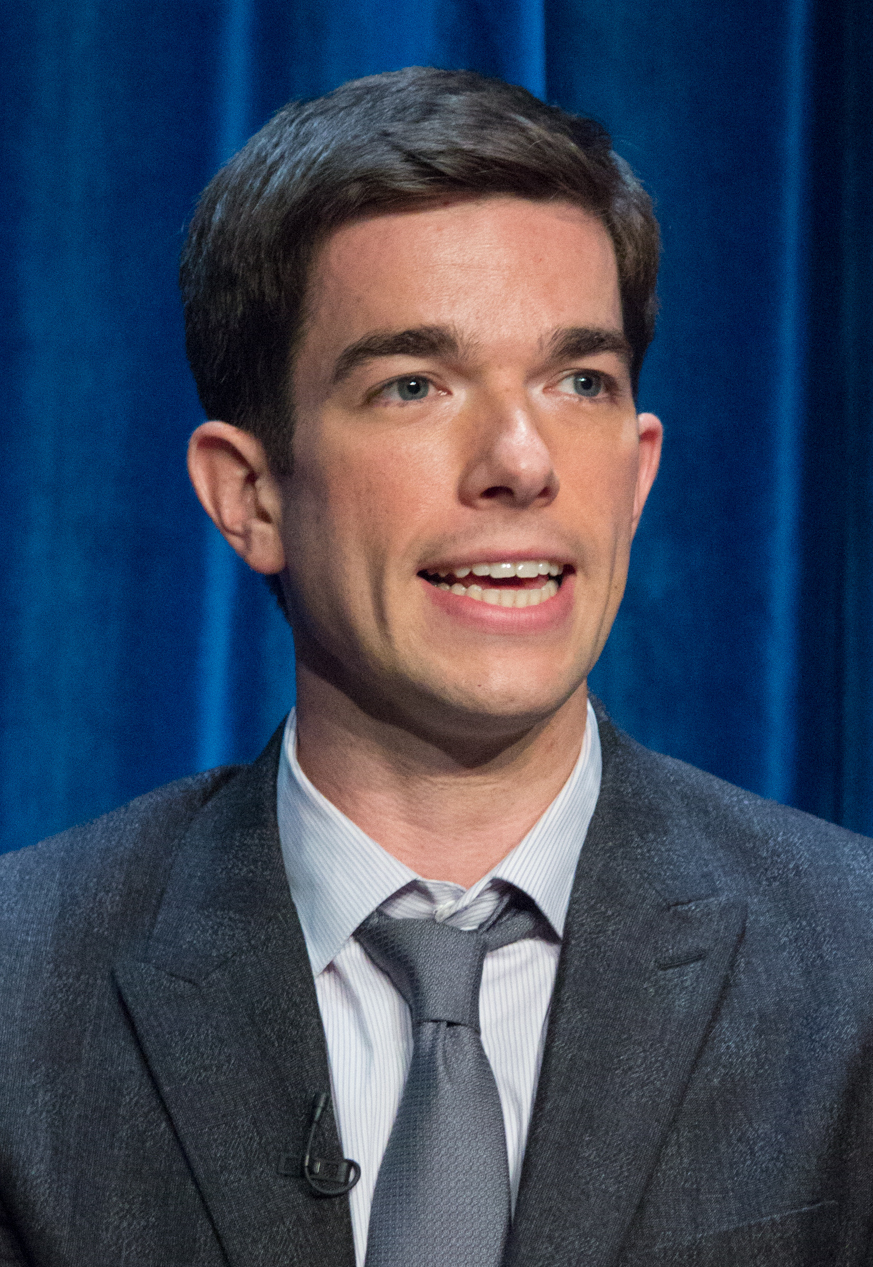
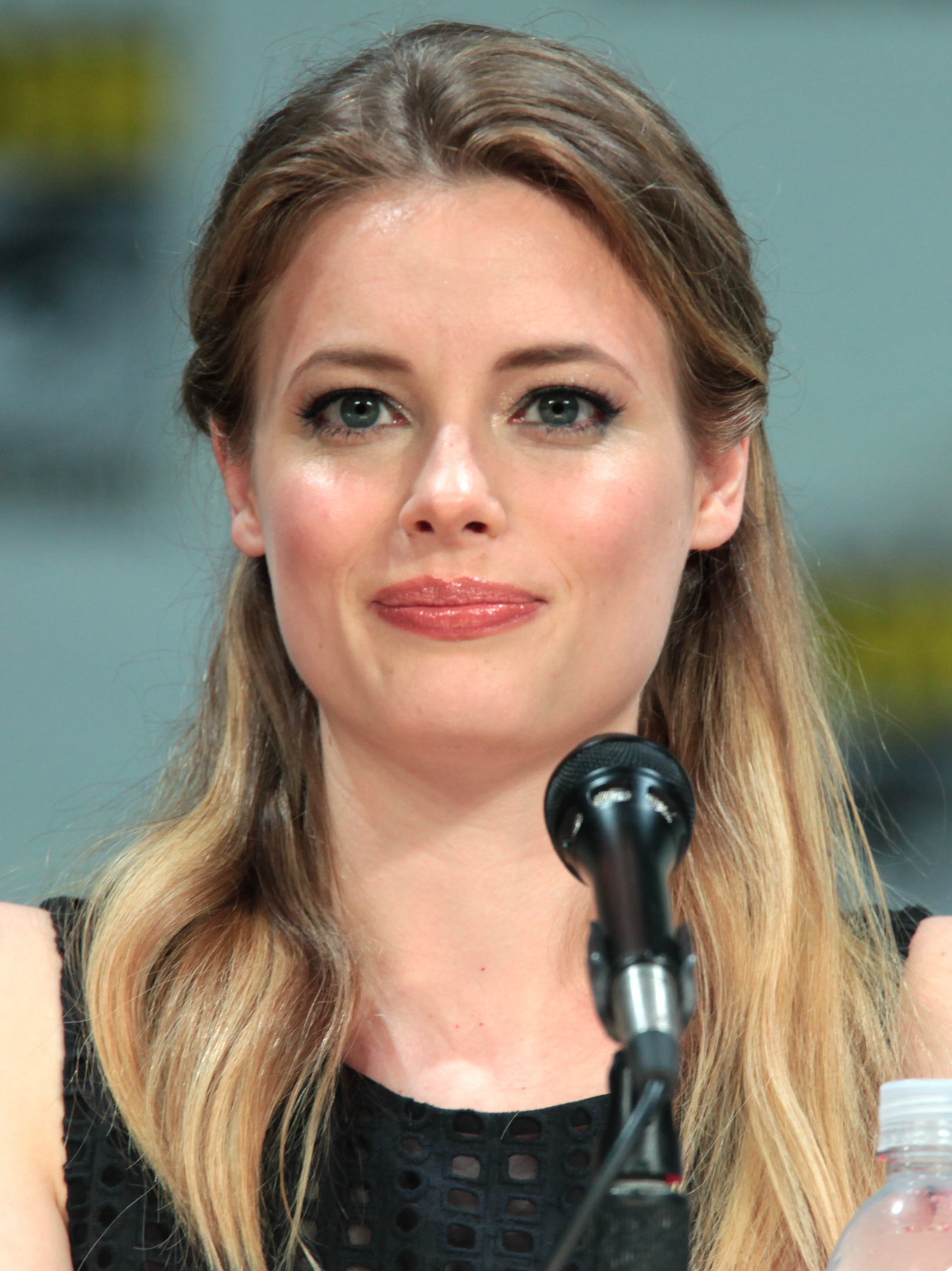
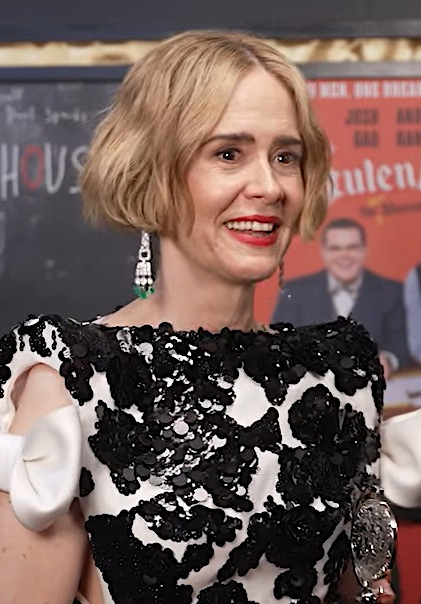
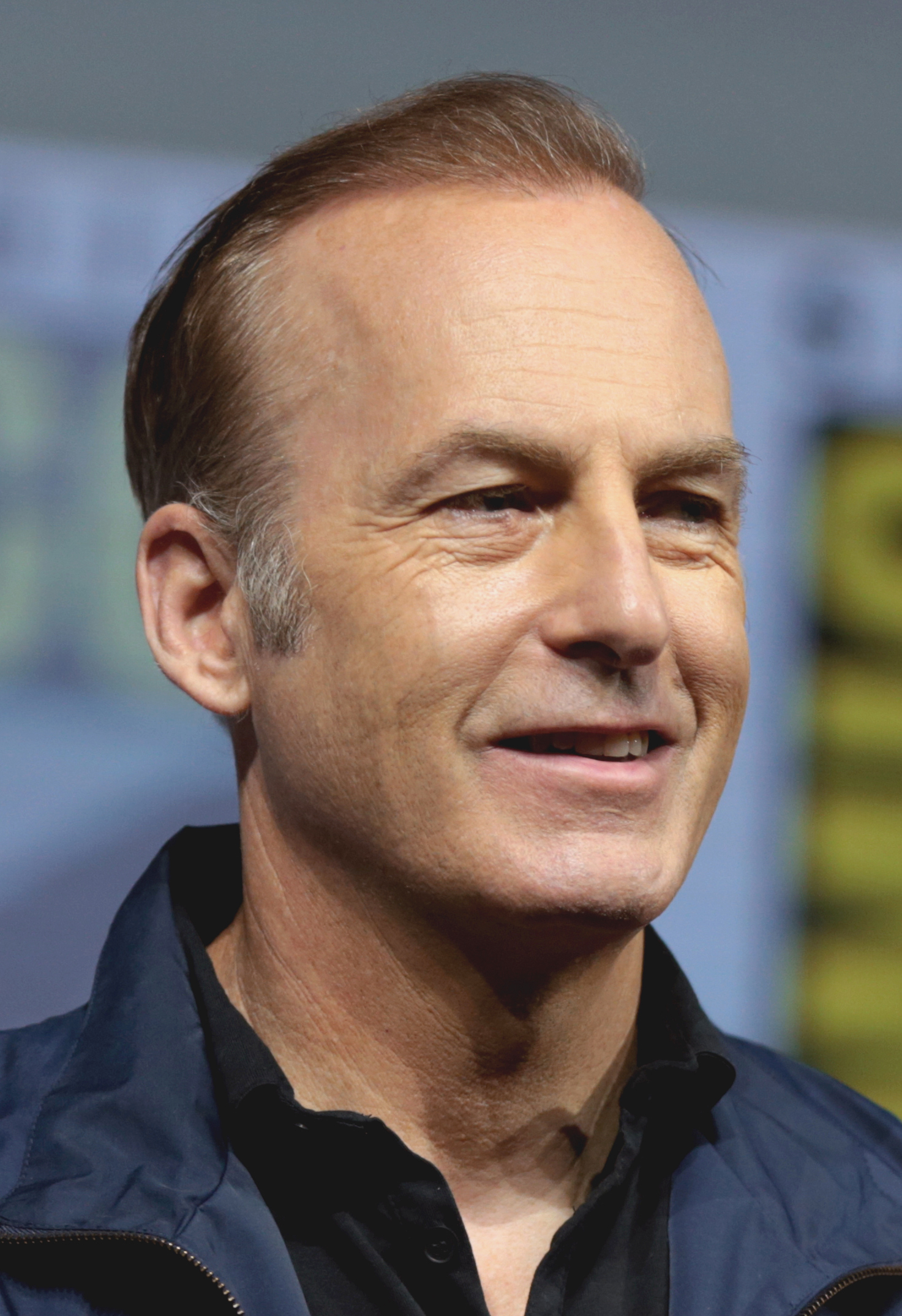
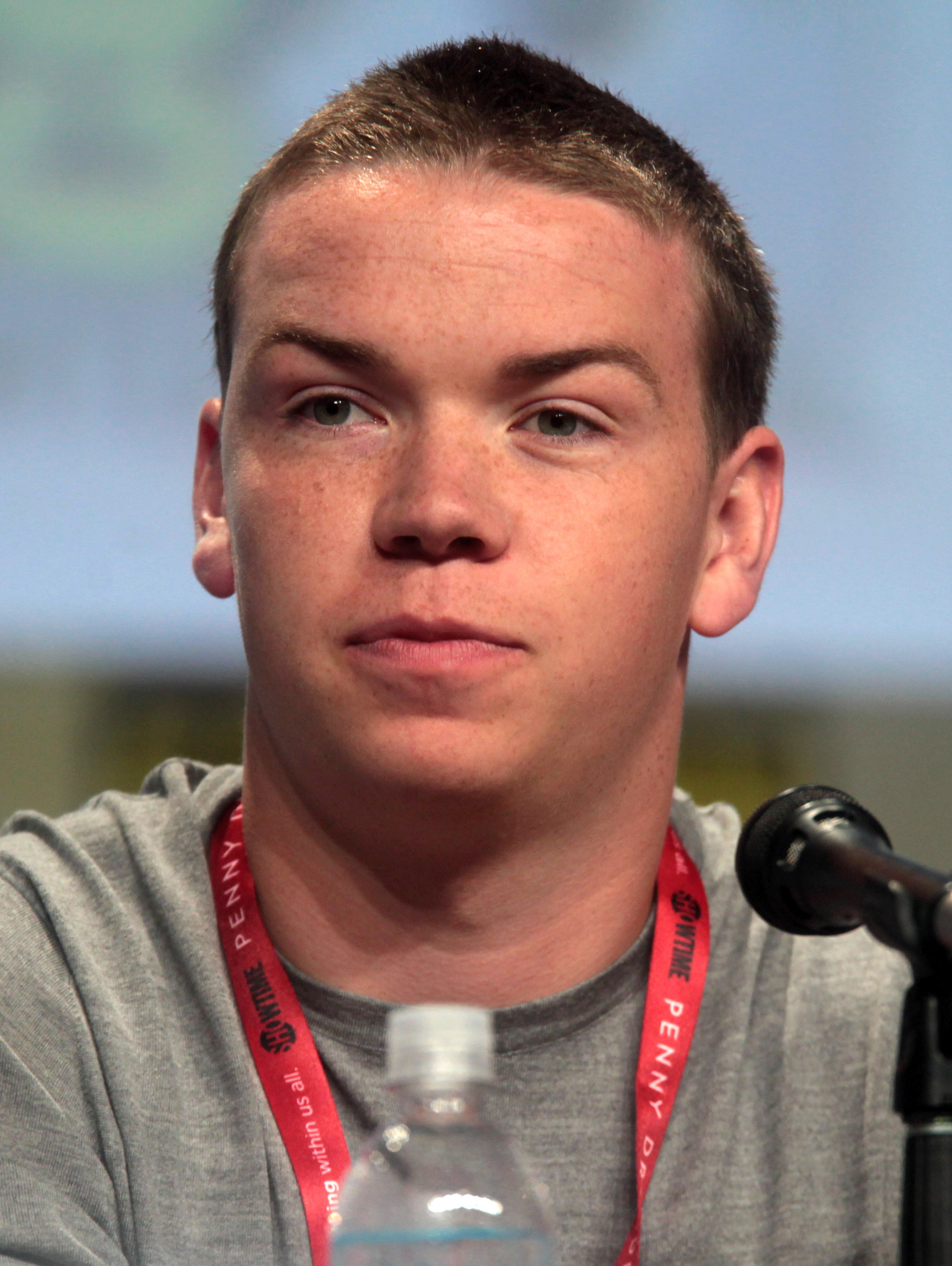
Jamie Lee Curtis, John Mulaney, Gillian Jacobs, Sarah Paulson, Bob Odenkirk and Will Poulter joined the series for the second season.

Matty Matheson was promoted to a series regular in this season. Will Poulter was cast as Chef Luca after being a big fan of the series. Jon Bernthal reprised his role as Michael Berzatto from the first season. Jamie Lee Curtis, John Mulaney, Gillian Jacobs, Sarah Paulson and Bob Odenkirk were all cast as members of the Berzatto family, with only Odenkirk's casting being announced prior to the season's release. Christopher Storer asked Ayo Edebiri who she wanted to play her dad, and Edebiri named Robert Townsend, who was cast in the part of Emmanuel Adamu. The casting of Molly Gordon as Claire was announced on Matty Matheson's Instagram and confirmed by Variety.

=== Writing ===
Series creator and co-showrunner Christopher Storer wrote three of the ten episodes, and co-showrunner Joanna Calo wrote three episodes. The rest of the episodes were written by Karen Joseph Adcock, Catherine Schetina, Stacy Osei-Kuffour, Sofya Levitsky-Weitz, Alex Russell, Rene Gube and Kelly Galuska.

Season 2 covers the period of February to May 2023. (Note: According to Carmy's old text messages, as seen in the season 4 episode "Groundhogs," they found Mikey's tomato-can money on Saturday, January 21, 2023. The calendar app on Carmy's phone puts "Beef" on February 28.) The narrative arc of the season was much about demolition, reconstruction, and the balance of emotional and cultural cost and reward that comes with change. Carmy "sent the pastry chef to his former restaurant in Copenhagen for a stage, where he received mentorship from a highly skilled chef. Team members lacking formal culinary training were enrolled in culinary school, where they learned proper station hygiene, knife skills, and classic recipes. Even Richie, chef Carm's main detractor, gained an appreciation for fine dining by training at a prestigious restaurant."

=== Filming ===
Filming for the second season began on February 21, 2023, and wrapped on April 28, 2023. Storer directed seven of the ten episodes, and Calo directed two. The only episode not directed by Storer or Calo was "Honeydew", which was directed by Ramy Youssef.

The episode "Forks" was filmed on location at Chicago's two-Michelin-starred restaurant Ever. The restaurant was shut down for one week and turned off its online reservation system to accommodate the filming schedule. Head chef Curtis Duffy cooked all the meals featured in the episode. Exteriors for "Honeydew" were shot on location in Denmark, but the kitchen scenes at "Noma" were filmed in Chicago at After, the cocktail lounge adjacent to Ever. The "Fishes" episode was filmed on location in a house in Evanston, Illinois.

Castmembers were actually demolishing the actual Original Beef of Chicagoland set at the Cinespace studios, using "hammers and crowbars." This authenticity was a surprise and minor challenge for the sound recording team, who had expected that the demolition "would be filmed as an insert shot separate from the dialogue." The restaurant kitchen is a fully functional working kitchen, not just a dead set. Similarly, the kitchen was designed with "practical lighting" so that "the lighting crew actually never had to light it....we worked with the lighting designer...very closely where to put exactly what lights and light temperature."

All told, production and post-production on season two took about four months.

=== Music ===
"Strange Currencies (Remix)" by R.E.M. and "If You Want Blood (You've Got It)" by AC/DC were the songs used in the official trailer for season two. Per producer Josh Senior, season two used three separate versions of R.E.M.'s "Strange Currencies: "the original, the incredible Scott Litt remix, and an unreleased demo." Apparently the lead singer of the band was quite hyped about the use of R.E.M. on the show; per Salon.com in 2023, "Michael Stipe has been posting on his Instagram Stories constantly. He's so excited." Other featured artists included Pearl Jam, Otis Redding, Taylor Swift, the Pixies, the Beach Boys, Brian Eno, and John Cale. According to Senior, the introduction of Taylor Swift music in season two was intended as a musical tie that binds together the Jerimoviches: "We came up with the idea to include Taylor Swift into the world of the show as a way to connect Richie to Tiffany and his daughter."

According to composer Jeffrey Qaiyum, "They're trying to do something more sophisticated with the restaurant, and the whole show has to do that as well, including the score. Less raw beats, less dirty electric guitars. Season two has more pizzicato strings and cellos and Rhodes and piano. Even in the mix, I was using side-chaining compression stuff you usually hear in EDM music to add a level of sophistication to the sound."

== Release ==
The second season of The Bear premiered on FX on Hulu in the United States on June 22, 2023, and became available internationally in the Star hub on Disney+. Along with other Hulu content, The Bear became available to stream on Disney+ in the United States via the Hulu hub on December 6, 2023.

== Reception ==
=== Audience viewership ===
According to the streaming aggregator Reelgood, The Bear was the second most watched program across all platforms in the United States during the week of June 22, 2023, and the most during the week of June 29, 2023. According to JustWatch, The Bear was the most streamed television series across all platforms in the United States during the week ending June 25, 2023. According to FX, the second season was the most-watched season premiere in the network's history. According to Whip Media's viewership tracking app TV Time, The Bear was the eighth most-watched streaming original television series of 2023.

=== Critical response ===
On Rotten Tomatoes, 99% of 109 critic reviews are positive for the second season, and the average rating is 9.3/10. The site's critical consensus reads, "Instead of reinventing the menu, The Bear's second season wisely opts to toss its lovable characters into another frying pan of adversity, lets 'em cook, and serves up yet another supremely satisfying dish." Metacritic assigned it a weighted average score of 92 out of 100 based on 42 critic reviews.

For the second year in a row, the American Film Institute named The Bear one of the ten best television programs of the year. The Bear appeared on many publications' lists of the best TV shows of 2023, including Rolling Stone, The New York Times, The Hollywood Reporter, and People, among others.

=== Accolades ===
The season received critical acclaim, with multiple awards nominations and wins. The season won eleven Primetime Emmy Awards for its 23 nominations, making it the season of television with the most wins in a single year for a comedy series, beating the record set by the first season, which won ten. The following is a list of awards the second season of The Bear has been nominated for or won.

Year	Award	Category	Nominee(s)	Result	Ref.
2024	AACTA International Awards	Best Comedy Series	The Bear	Won	
2024	AACTA International Awards	Best Actor in a Series	Jeremy Allen White	Won	
2024	AARP Movies for Grownups Awards	Best Actor	Oliver Platt	Nominated	
2024	Artios Awards	Outstanding Achievement in Casting – Television Comedy Pilot or First Season	Jeanie Bacharach, Mickie Paskal, Jennifer Rudnicke, AJ Links	Won	
2024	American Cinema Editors	Best Edited Single Camera Comedy Series	Joanna Naugle (for "Fishes")	Won	
2024	American Cinema Editors	Best Edited Single Camera Comedy Series	Adam Epstein (for "Forks")	Nominated	
2024	American Society of Cinematographers Awards	Outstanding Achievement in Cinematography in Episode of a Half Hour Series for Television	Andrew Wehde (for "The Bear")	Nominated	
2024	Art Directors Guild Awards	Excellence in Production Design for a Half Hour Single-Camera Television Series	Merje Veski (for "Omelette")	Nominated	
2024	Astra TV Awards	Best Streaming Series, Comedy	The Bear	Nominated	
2024	Astra TV Awards	Best Actor in a Streaming Series, Comedy	Jeremy Allan White	Won	
2024	Astra TV Awards	Best Actress in a Streaming Series, Comedy	Ayo Edebiri	Nominated	
2024	Astra TV Awards	Best Supporting Actor in a Streaming Series, Comedy	Ebon Moss-Bachrach	Won	
2024	Astra TV Awards	Best Supporting Actor in a Streaming Series, Comedy	Matty Matheson	Nominated	
2024	Astra TV Awards	Best Supporting Actor in a Streaming Series, Comedy	Oliver Platt	Nominated	
2024	Astra TV Awards	Best Supporting Actress in a Streaming Series, Comedy	Abby Elliott	Nominated	
2024	Astra TV Awards	Best Supporting Actress in a Streaming Series, Comedy	Liza Colón-Zayas	Nominated	
2024	Astra TV Awards	Best Guest Actor in a Streaming Series, Comedy	Bob Odenkirk	Nominated	
2024	Astra TV Awards	Best Guest Actor in a Streaming Series, Comedy	Jon Bernthal	Won	
2024	Astra TV Awards	Best Guest Actress in a Streaming Series, Comedy	Jamie Lee Curtis	Won	
2024	Astra TV Awards	Best Guest Actress in a Streaming Series, Comedy	Olivia Colman	Nominated	
2024	Astra TV Awards	Best Guest Actress in a Streaming Series, Comedy	Sarah Paulson	Nominated	
2024	Astra TV Awards	Best Directing in a Streaming Series, Comedy	Christopher Storer (for "Fishes")	Won	
2024	Astra TV Awards	Best Writing in a Streaming Series, Comedy	Christopher Storer (for "Fishes")	Nominated	
2024	British Academy Television Awards	Best International Programme	The Bear	Nominated	
2024	Cinema Audio Society Awards	Outstanding Achievement in Sound Mixing for Television Series – Half Hour	Scott D. Smith, Steve "Major" Giammaria, Patrick Christensen, Ryan Collison (for "Forks")	Won	
2024	Costume Designers Guild Awards	Excellence in Contemporary Television	Courtney Wheeler (for "Fishes")	Nominated	
2024	Critics' Choice Television Awards	Best Comedy Series	The Bear	Won	
2024	Critics' Choice Television Awards	Best Actor in a Comedy Series	Jeremy Allen White	Won	
2024	Critics' Choice Television Awards	Best Actress in a Comedy Series	Ayo Edebiri	Won	
2024	Critics' Choice Television Awards	Best Supporting Actor in a Comedy Series	Ebon Moss-Bachrach	Won	
2024	Directors Guild of America Awards	Outstanding Directing – Comedy Series	Christopher Storer (for "Fishes")	Won	
2024	Directors Guild of America Awards	Outstanding Directing – Comedy Series	Ramy Youssef (for "Honeydew")	Nominated	
2024	Golden Globe Awards	Best Television Series – Musical or Comedy	The Bear	Won	
2024	Golden Globe Awards	Best Actor – Television Series Musical or Comedy	Jeremy Allen White	Won	
2024	Golden Globe Awards	Best Actress – Television Series Musical or Comedy	Ayo Edebiri	Won	
2024	Golden Globe Awards	Best Supporting Actor – Series, Miniseries or Television Film	Ebon Moss-Bachrach	Nominated	
2024	Golden Globe Awards	Best Supporting Actress – Series, Miniseries or Television Film	Abby Elliott	Nominated	
2024	Golden Reel Awards	Outstanding Achievement in Sound Editing – Broadcast Short Form	Steve "Major" Giammaria, Andrea Bella, Matt Snedecor, Evan Benjamin, John Werner, John Bowen, Annie Taylor, Leslie Bloome, Shaun Brennan (for "Fishes")	Nominated	
2024	Golden Reel Awards	Outstanding Achievement in Music Editing – Broadcast Short Form	Jason Lingle, Jeff Lingle (for "Fishes")	Nominated	
2024	Make-Up Artists and Hair Stylists Guild Awards	Best Contemporary Make-Up in a Television Series, Limited, Miniseries, or Movie for Television	Ignacia Soto-Aguilar, Nicole Rogers	Nominated	
2024	Make-Up Artists and Hair Stylists Guild Awards	Best Contemporary Hair Styling in a Television Series, Limited, Miniseries, or Movie for Television	Ally Vickers, Angela Brasington, Melanie Shaw	Nominated	
2024	NAACP Image Awards	Outstanding Supporting Actress in a Comedy Series	Ayo Edebiri	Won	
2024	People's Choice Awards	The Show of the Year	The Bear	Nominated	
2024	People's Choice Awards	The Comedy Show of the Year	The Bear	Nominated	
2024	People's Choice Awards	The Male TV Star of the Year	Jeremy Allen White	Nominated	
2024	People's Choice Awards	The Comedy TV Star of the Year	Jeremy Allen White	Won	
2024	People's Choice Awards	The TV Performance of the Year	Ayo Edebiri	Nominated	
2024	Primetime Emmy Awards	Outstanding Comedy Series	The Bear	Nominated	
2024	Primetime Emmy Awards	Outstanding Lead Actor in a Comedy Series	Jeremy Allen White (for "The Bear")	Won	
2024	Primetime Emmy Awards	Outstanding Lead Actress in a Comedy Series	Ayo Edebiri (for "Sundae")	Nominated	
2024	Primetime Emmy Awards	Outstanding Supporting Actor in a Comedy Series	Lionel Boyce (for "Honeydew")	Nominated	
2024	Primetime Emmy Awards	Outstanding Supporting Actor in a Comedy Series	Ebon Moss-Bachrach (for "Forks")	Won	
2024	Primetime Emmy Awards	Outstanding Supporting Actress in a Comedy Series	Liza Colón-Zayas (for "Pop")	Won	
2024	Primetime Emmy Awards	Outstanding Directing for a Comedy Series	Christopher Storer (for "Fishes")	Won	
2024	Primetime Emmy Awards	Outstanding Directing for a Comedy Series	Ramy Youssef (for "Honeydew")	Nominated	
2024	Primetime Emmy Awards	Outstanding Writing for a Comedy Series	Christopher Storer and Joanna Calo (for "Fishes")	Nominated	
2024	Primetime Creative Arts Emmy Awards	Outstanding Guest Actor in a Comedy Series	Jon Bernthal (for "Fishes")	Won	
2024	Primetime Creative Arts Emmy Awards	Outstanding Guest Actor in a Comedy Series	Bob Odenkirk (for "Fishes")	Nominated	
2024	Primetime Creative Arts Emmy Awards	Outstanding Guest Actor in a Comedy Series	Will Poulter (for "Honeydew")	Nominated	
2024	Primetime Creative Arts Emmy Awards	Outstanding Guest Actress in a Comedy Series	Olivia Colman (for "Forks")	Nominated	
2024	Primetime Creative Arts Emmy Awards	Outstanding Guest Actress in a Comedy Series	Jamie Lee Curtis (for "Fishes")	Won	
2024	Primetime Creative Arts Emmy Awards	Outstanding Production Design for a Narrative Program (Half-Hour)	Eric Frankel, Lisa Korpan, and Merje Veski (for "Omelette")	Nominated	
2024	Primetime Creative Arts Emmy Awards	Outstanding Casting for a Comedy Series	Jeanie Bacharach, Maggie Bacharach, Jennifer Rudnicke, Mickie Paskal, AJ Links	Won	
2024	Primetime Creative Arts Emmy Awards	Outstanding Cinematography for a Single-Camera Series (Half-Hour)	Andrew Wehde (for "Forks")	Won	
2024	Primetime Creative Arts Emmy Awards	Outstanding Contemporary Costumes for a Series	Steven "Rage" Rehage, Lariana Santiago, Courtney Wheeler (for "Fishes")	Nominated	
2024	Primetime Creative Arts Emmy Awards	Outstanding Contemporary Hairstyling	Angela Brasington, Melanie Shaw, Ally Vickers (for "Fishes")	Nominated	
2024	Primetime Creative Arts Emmy Awards	Outstanding Contemporary Makeup (Non-Prosthetic)	Justine Losoya, Zsofia Otvos, Nicole Rogers, Ignacia Soto-Aguilar (for "Fishes")	Nominated	
2024	Primetime Creative Arts Emmy Awards	Outstanding Picture Editing for a Single-Camera Comedy Series	Joanna Naugle (for "Fishes")	Won	
2024	Primetime Creative Arts Emmy Awards	Outstanding Sound Editing for a Comedy or Drama Series (Half-Hour) and Animation	Steve "Major" Giammaria, Andrea Bella, Evan Benjamin, Jonathan Fuhrer, Annie Taylor, Jason Lingle, Jeff Lingle, Leslie Bloome, Shaun Brennan (for "Forks")	Won	
2024	Primetime Creative Arts Emmy Awards	Outstanding Sound Mixing for a Comedy or Drama Series (Half-Hour) and Animation	Steve "Major" Giammaria, Scott D. Smith, Patrick Christensen, Ryan Collison (for "Forks")	Won	
2024	Producers Guild of America Awards	Danny Thomas Award for Outstanding Producer of Episodic Television, Comedy	The Bear	Won	
2024	Satellite Awards	Best Comedy or Musical Series	The Bear	Nominated	
2024	Satellite Awards	Best Actor – Comedy or Musical Series	Jeremy Allen White	Won	
2024	Satellite Awards	Best Actress – Comedy or Musical Series	Ayo Edebiri	Nominated	
2024	Screen Actors Guild Awards	Outstanding Performance by an Ensemble in a Comedy Series	Lionel Boyce, Jose Cervantes Jr, Liza Colón-Zayas, Ayo Edebiri, Abby Elliott, Richard Esteras, Edwin Lee Gibson, Molly Gordon, Corey Hendrix, Matty Matheson, Ebon Moss-Bachrach, Oliver Platt and Jeremy Allen White	Won	
2024	Screen Actors Guild Awards	Outstanding Performance by a Male Actor in a Comedy Series	Jeremy Allen White	Won	
2024	Screen Actors Guild Awards	Outstanding Performance by a Male Actor in a Comedy Series	Ebon Moss-Bachrach	Nominated	
2024	Screen Actors Guild Awards	Outstanding Performance by a Female Actor in a Comedy Series	Ayo Edebiri	Won	
2024	Television Critics Association Awards	Program of the Year	The Bear	Nominated	
2024	Television Critics Association Awards	Outstanding Achievement in Comedy	The Bear	Nominated	
2024	Television Critics Association Awards	Individual Achievement in Comedy	Ayo Edebiri	Nominated	
2024	Television Critics Association Awards	Individual Achievement in Comedy	Jeremy Allen White	Nominated	
2024	Writers Guild of America Awards	Comedy Series	Karen Joseph Adcock, Joanna Calo, Kelly Galuska, Rene Gube, Sofya Levitsky-Weitz, Stacy Osei-Kuffour, Alex Russell, Catherine Schetina, Christopher Storer	Won	
2024	Writers Guild of America Awards	Episodic Comedy	Joanna Calo and Christopher Storer (for "Fishes")	Nominated	
2024	Writers Guild of America Awards	Episodic Comedy	Alex Russell (for "Forks")	Nominated	

== Sources ==
- Opazo, M. Pilar (January 2025). "Media Review: Cooking Up Organizational Change at The Bear". Organization Studies. 46 (1): 149–152. doi:10.1177/01708406241273789. ISSN 0170-8406.
- Smith, Scott D. (Fall 2025). "The Bear: The Challenges of Managing Kitchen Chaos". Production Sound & Video. 17 (4). North Hollywood, California: IATSE 695: 32–37.
