= Beef (The Bear) =

- The Bear episode
- Carmy's draft budget for the rebuild
- Episode no.: Season 2 Episode 1
- Directed by: Christopher Storer
- Written by: Christopher Storer
- Cinematography by: Andrew Wehde
- Editing by: Joanna Naugle
- Production code: XCBV2001
- Original release date: June 22, 2023
- Running time: 29 minutes

Guest appearances
- Oliver Platt as Jimmy "Cicero" Kalinowski; Edwin Lee Gibson as Ebraheim; Corey Hendrix as Gary "Sweeps" Woods; José Cervantes as Angel; Richard Esteras as Manny; Alma Washington as Angela Brooks

Episode chronology
← Previous "Braciole"	Next → "Pasta"
- The Bear season 2

"Beef" is the first episode of the second season of the American television comedy-drama The Bear. It is the 9th overall episode of the series and was written and directed by series creator Christopher Storer. It was released on Hulu on June 22, 2023, along with the rest of the season.

The series follows Carmen "Carmy" Berzatto, an award-winning New York City chef de cuisine, who returns to his hometown of Chicago to run his late brother Michael's failing Italian beef sandwich shop. In the episode, Carmy and the staff start planning their new restaurant, but realize the costs and expenses might be bigger than anticipated.

Critics praised the performances and new storylines for the season.

== Plot ==
Marcus (Lionel Boyce) visits his terminally ill mother before heading back to work. Carmy (Jeremy Allen White) and the staff start talking about the renovation costs, which could exceed $95,000. Carmy also has a talk with Richie (Ebon Moss-Bachrach), who is confused over his "purpose" and role in the restaurant. Carmy tells him he will not replace him, also reiterating that he does not consider his job "fun" even though he still loves it.

Natalie (Abby Elliott), who was asked by Sydney (Ayo Edebiri) to become the restaurant's new project manager, tells Carmy that the costs might actually go up due to IRS stipulations and other bureaucratic fees. Carmy, Sydney and Natalie consult with Cicero (Oliver Platt), asking him for a $500,000 loan. Cicero hesitates at the idea, but Carmy promises they will give the loan back within 18 months; if they are unable to re-pay, the restaurant will be closed and the property will be given to Cicero, valued at $2 million. Cicero finally accepts. Later on, however, Natalie tells Carmy that they will not make a profit on the restaurant until eight months in, and it will take at least six months for the renovations.

As Carmy and the staff start considering new employees and methods, Sydney approaches Tina (Liza Colón-Zayas), asking her to become her sous-chef. Tina hugs Sydney and accepts the offer. That night, Carmy, Sydney and Natalie meet at the restaurant to start their planning earlier. As they get a calendar marked with important dates, Sydney asks them if they think it is a terrible idea. Everyone agrees, yes, it is a terrible idea, as they set a goal to open the restaurant in three months.

== Reception ==
=== Critical reviews ===
"Beef" received critical acclaim. Marah Eakin of Vulture gave the episode a perfect 5 star out of 5 rating and wrote, "There's a vision board, timeline, and plan of attack, and while they're all pretty sure that everything they're planning on doing is a terrible idea, they're doing it all the same. It's that kind of manic confidence and blind ambition that made us all fall for The Bear in the first place, so, to quote Mikey Berzatto, let's let it rip."

A.J. Daulerio of Decider wrote, "High-minded literary types will find metaphors everywhere in the crew's rebirth/rebuild/renovation, but despite the optimism and commitment to change, the walls are closing in. Or, in the case of the doomed staff, the walls are eating them alive." Arnav Srivastava of The Review Geek gave the episode a 4 star rating out of 5 and wrote, "It is almost like The Bear never left. Season 2 picks up right off from where we left off last year. With the same beats, tense atmosphere, fast editing, and problems stacking up one after the other, The Bear is back." Karl R De Mesa from Show Snob wrote, "A great, very kinetic episode to catch us up from the events of the previous season, while getting us pumped for the ones to come."

Rafa Boladeras of MovieWeb named the episode as the seventh best of the season, writing "Even with all this mess in their hands, the best scene might be the one between Carmy and Richie, where the “cousin” tells the chef how he feels lost and without purpose, and Carmy reassures him he'll always have a place with him." Jasmine Blu of TV Fanatic named the episode as the ninth best of the season, writing "Their plan seemed impossible, which is what set such a high bar goal for the remainder of the season. But for the most part, the first installment merely eased us into things before the real drama unfolded."
