= Goodbye (The Bear) =

- The Bear episode
- Episode no.: Season 4 Episode 10
- Directed by: Christopher Storer
- Written by: Christopher Storer
- Cinematography by: Andrew Wehde
- Editing by: Joanna Naugle
- Production code: XCBV4010
- Original air date: June 25, 2025
- Running time: 34 minutes

Episode chronology
← Previous "Tonnato"	Next → "Gary"
- The Bear season 4

"Goodbye" is the 10th episode of the fourth season of the American comedy-drama television series The Bear. It is the 38th overall episode of the series and was written and directed by series creator Christopher Storer. It was released on Hulu on June 25, 2025, along with the rest of the season.

The series follows Carmen "Carmy" Berzatto (Jeremy Allen White), an award-winning New York City chef de cuisine, who returns to his hometown of Chicago to run his late brother Michael's failing Italian beef sandwich shop. With the financial backing of his uncle Jimmy (Oliver Platt) and help from his cousin Richie (Ebon Moss-Bachrach), sister Sugar (Abby Elliott), and chef Sydney (Ayo Edebiri), Carmy attempts to remodel the dingy Beef into a warm and hospitable fine-dining destination called the Bear.

== Plot ==
Sydney confronts Carmy over his decision to quit. Carmy insists he is making the best decision for the restaurant, arguing that he became a chef to avoid facing his familial trauma, and that Sydney is pursuing the field for the right reasons. He tells Sydney she is the reason the restaurant is surviving, and that he believes in her more than he believes in himself. Richie interrupts them; he is initially flippant about the news until Carmy reveals he came to Mikey's funeral, but could not bring himself to attend. The two have an honest and heartfelt conversation in front of Sydney, where they admit the resentments they held towards one another in the wake of Mikey's death. Carmy tells Richie that he is retiring in part to learn who he is outside of the kitchen. Sydney ultimately agrees to take over if Richie is also given a partnership stake, which he accepts. Natalie arrives and tearfully embraces Carmy upon learning the news while Cicero's clock eventually reaches zero.

== Production ==
=== Writing ===
Christopher Storer wrote the teleplay for "Goodbye."

=== Filming ===
Only four of the main castmembers, Edebiri, White, Moss-Bachrach, and Elliott, appear in this episode. "Goodbye" was filmed in 2024, prior to the expansion of season three, with additional filming for season four completed in 2025. According to White, in an interview with Vogue in autumn 2025, "Goodbye" was shot with three cameras in four takes.

Cinematographer Andrew Wehde said in 2026, "The great thing at nighttime is there's consistency to it, right? You don't have light change. So it's more about just building an ambience and building out your city lights and things like that. And so we were able to put together kind of a faux outdoor stage set and allowed them to just do what they needed. So if it took two hours, six hours, 10 hours, whatever it was, we had the time. That was captured three cameras, two of them on Panavision 11 to 1s. And then my A camera, Gary Malouf, he was handheld, and Chris [Dame] was kind of like I could stay with him for as long as I wanted because he could chase the dialogue and chase the story while the other two always had like cutaway points."

=== Music ===
The soundtrack of this episode features only one song, "Fast Slow Disco," released in 2017 as a track on St. Vincent's Masseduction album.

== Reception ==
=== Critical reviews ===
Sepinwall found the instalment "moving" and "another remarkable chapter in a season that had several of those." Writing elsewhere about "Worms" and "Bears," he added, "we see at the end of the season that Carmy trusts and cares for [Sydney] like he does his own sister. Like Tiffany, she's a Bear forever if she wants to be."

New York Times opinion columnist David French devoted an entire column to the lessons of the episode, concluding, "[The family's] terrible tension and pain can make The Bear difficult to watch...[but] At a time of extraordinary fury, we all live in a degree of pain. We all live with regrets. But hope can come from unexpected places—and perhaps a show that features scallops, pastries, and Chicago beef can also teach us that only repentance can heal our broken hearts." The season concludes with what has been characterized as a "sacrifice of love made for the benefit of the restaurant, and the meaning of...risks taken [by Carmy and Syd] lingers...for fans."

Noel Murray, another The New York Times writer, said that "Goodbye" has "a raw, unsettled feel, with only one truly warm moment: when Sydney convinces Carmy to make Richie a partner too. The sustained intensity in just one location is impressive, especially when Carmy and Richie finally talk through their misapprehensions of what each other's lives have been like. But the aftertaste is strangely sour." Murray laid some of this at the feet of Bear's perennially poor communication skills: "Carmy has a bad habit of trying to speed-run through big conversations, saying he just wants to talk for 'a second,' then getting frustrated when people misunderstand what he is trying to say. One of his most repeated phrases, always in a shout, is, 'That's not what this is!'"

Vulture characterized the episode as "painfully intimate," with White's usually-withholding Carmy exposing "his tender insides to two of the most important people in his life, opening the door for them to do the same. It's audacious to close out a season of television like this, but the gambit pays dividends." Much of the episode is consumed with "dramatic and traumatic" verbal duels between Carmy and Syd, and then between Carmy and Richie, but in the end the arguments are much-needed catharsis, a necessary step in unfucking the relationships that make the restaurant work, which "can only help push [the Bear] even more into the positive column."

Elle magazine commented, "Having to parse through which of Carmy’s statements are true, and which are his stumbling approximations of the truth, is what makes him both a fascinating character and a frustrating one. It's also what makes 'Goodbye' both touching and convoluted."

Much like Elle's commentary, an Eater columnist focused on the script's obfuscation of Carmy's motives: "The show certainly wants us to believe that some time spent away from a kitchen, weaving baskets or working in a grocery store, is exactly what he needs to find happiness. What is less clear, though, is how he comes to this conclusion. Is it a genuine realization that restaurant work is killing him, or just another example of avoidant, self-sabotaging Carmy running away from the problems that he has created? Who can say?" Still, wrote Eater, "After four seasons, it's clear that a new kind of blended family has formed here, not through blood but through trauma-bonding and stress and hard work. And despite all the screaming and fighting and accidental stabbings, there's a whole lot of love, too."

The Ringer columnist Ben Lindbergh wrote of the season-four finale, "It took much too long for these three—two, in particular—to talk things out. But when the knockdown, drag-out confessional came, they crushed the ever-living shit out of that motherfucker, to borrow an original Richie motivational quote. Carm tells Richie that he's much more than a cousin, and at Sydney's prodding, he makes Richie a partner on paper, as well as in spirit." Lindbergh described the dialogue and emotion of "Goodbye" as "the conversational equivalent of a thunderstorm that brings a merciful, if furious, end to a heat wave."

Screen Rant deemed it one of the best episodes of The Bear ever produced. Collider thought the episode suggested a potential romantic future for Syd and Carmy: "Just when we thought The Bear couldn't top 'I wouldn't even want to do this without you,' the show one-upped its most romantic line with 'Any chance of any kind of good in this building? It started when you walked in. And any possibility of it surviving? It's with you.' The season ended with the setup of some excellent angst between Carmy and Sydney after he abandoned her and the restaurant, and if this doesn't pay off with a romantic storyline next season, then it will be a true missed opportunity and a real shame."
