= Emmanuel Adamu =

Fictional character, The Bear TV series

- The Bear character
- Robert Townsend as Adamu in "The Bear"
- First appearance: "Pasta"; June 22, 2023
- Last appearance: "The Original Beef of Chicagoland"; June 25, 2026
- Created by: Christopher Storer; Joanna Calo
- Portrayed by: Robert Townsend

In-universe information
- Children: Sydney Adamu (daughter)

Emmanuel Adamu is a fictional character on the FX Network television series The Bear, portrayed by Robert Townsend. the father of chef Sydney Adamu (Ayo Edebiri). Emmanuel Adamu has appeared in 12 episodes of the show, beginning with the season 2 episode "Pasta".

== Background and casting ==
Actor–director Townsend is himself a Chicago native, and his one-man show Living the Shuffle examines his own childhood "being raised on the West Side of Chicago by a single parent. I lived in K Town." Townsend told an interviewer that, cinematically, "When I think about growing up in Chicago, it's Claudine. In Claudine, they lived in the 'hood, but there was so much love, so much joy...When I talk about Chicago, I bring the energy of what Claudine was and what Cooley High was, because there's a lot of love and a lot of great people." Townsend directed Eddie Murphy Raw, wrote and directed and starred in The Five Heartbeats (costarring Harry Lennix, later to guest star on The Bear as James Brooks) and The Meteor Man, and directed Carmen: A Hip Hopera starring Beyoncé, among many other credits over a 45-year career in Hollywood. The Five Heartbeats (1991) is movie about the music industry that the UCLA Film & Television Archive described as "a clear-eyed critique of a business that profits from Black genius while denying Black ownership."

Edebiri wanted "multi-hyphenate" Townsend to play the role of her onscreen dad, joking that he had already raised her as the TV dad of The Parent 'Hood, a 1990s WB Network family sitcom, of which Townsend was also an executive producer. Townsend has described Edebiri as "a baby unicorn...I love her being. As an artist, you respond to people's energy and who they are. We call it that 'it thing' in show business and she has that it thing." Edebiri described him as a "North star" for multihyphenate Black creatives.

== Biography ==
Mr. Adamu has been described as "a serious candidate for Father of the Year: supportive, available, cautious, and proud of his child...Emmanuel raised his daughter almost by himself and still did a great job, as Sydney is a young woman who's well aware of who she is and her place in the world. He may seem a little too worried about her, especially the trust she puts in Carmy, but he supports whatever path she decides to take." Emmanuel's wife died when their daughter was young and he was thus a widower and single parent. He raised Sydney in their hometown of Chicago, Illinois, United States. He apparently has at least two brothers, twins Red and Zeke.

Syd's dad is first introduced in "Sheridan" as an offscreen voice; Syd apologizes for disturbing his sleep when she makes a noise while heading to work. In "Review," after Syd's ribs and risotto dish gets a good notice in the paper, Marcus comments, "Hey, Syd, congrats. You better tell your pops." He first appears onscreen in "Pasta" and then supports Sydney, cautiously, at the time of the restaurant opening in "Omelette" and "The Bear."

He seems to work a blue-collar job in maintenance or in some kind of an industrial–manufacturing business. Decor in his apartment living room includes an oil painting of Chicago L trains, a stereo system with a collection of vinyl record albums, a large number of houseplants, and a book collection including novels by Toni Morrison (multiple titles, including The Bluest Eye), Zora Neale Hurston, Rosa Guy, and Charles Dickens, and non-fiction titles by writers including Barack Obama and Eckhart Tolle. His kitchen features a painting of a rainy-day cityscape, a bright yellow cookie jar, a copy of Edna Lewis' In Pursuit of Flavor, more houseplants, and a rustic, glass-fronted hutch in the corner.

Syd's dad gave her a copy of Coach Mike Krzyzewski's book, Leading with the Heart: Coach K's Successful Strategies for Basketball, Business, and Life to help her with the process of launching the Bear restaurant. Coach K is a Chicago native and one of his leadership lessons is knowing "who's good at doing what and allowing them their space, at that moment [in the season 2 finale soft-launch of the restaurant], Richie was the right person to take over, so Sydney could be the extra pair of hands in the kitchen," allowing the Bear kitchen a comeback from behind, like the Duke Blue Devils against the Maryland Terrapins in the 2001 tournament conference finals. By season 3, Syd is ready to go back out on her own, even though she and her dad remain very close. As described by the A.V. Club, "Syd and Emmanuel's father-daughter rapport in the cold open [of "Next"] is pitch-perfect, the former reminding him to take his blood pressure meds [Benazepril] as the latter describes the crap he's taking in vivid detail."

He uses what Syd calls a "stinky CPAP machine." Emmanuel Adamu had a first-degree heart block cardiac incident in season 4, which Sydney initially believes is a heart attack (myocardial infarction). Syd is possibly of Nigerian-American heritage on her father's side.

== Critical reception ==
BuzzFeed wrote in 2025, "His relationship with Syd is both sweet and realistically nuanced, and Townsend and Edebiri do an outstanding job of selling us on their father-daughter dynamic."

Tara Ariano of Cracked named Townsend as the top guest star of the season 4, "A gentle, droll, unfailingly kind man, Emmanuel doesn't give up trying to maintain contact with his very busy daughter, nor hold it against her when she does a poor job holding up her half of the relationship. When he has a mild heart attack halfway through the season, Sydney melts down in the hospital waiting room realizing for the first time that she could lose the most reliable figure of her life—the person whose support and belief in her has made her feel safe to pursue her potentially risky dreams."

Vulture's Marah Eakin wrote in her "Sophie" recap, "The depth and love with which he imbues Emmanuel Adamu is palpable even though he doesn't always get that much to say. He just radiates 'excellent dad' vibes. When he forbids Syd from coming back to live with him with a line like, 'I am the Iceman'? That's immaculate dad culture right there. I'll admit I absolutely cried, just like Syd."

== See also ==
- List of The Bear characters

== Sources ==
- Haddix, Carol Mighton; Kraig, Bruce; Sen, Colleen Taylor, eds. (2017). The Chicago Food Encyclopedia. Heartland Foodways. Urbana: The University of Illinois Press. ISBN 978-0-252-09977-9. LCCN 2017007883. OCLC 973222701. Project MUSE book 55651.
