= Sophie (The Bear) =

- The Bear episode
- Episode no.: Season 4 Episode 6
- Directed by: Christopher Storer
- Written by: Christopher Storer
- Cinematography by: Andrew Wehde
- Editing by: Joanna Naugle; Adam Epstein
- Production code: XCBV4006
- Original air date: June 25, 2025
- Running time: 30 minutes

Guest appearances
- Molly Gordon as Claire Dunlap; Robert Townsend as Emmanuel Adamu; Will Poulter as Luca; Ricky Staffieri as Ted Fak; Corey Hendrix as Gary "Sweeps" Woods; Sarah Ramos as Chef Jess; Christopher J. Zucchero as Chi-Chi; Paulie James as Chuckie; Deveon Bromby as nurse (voice)

Episode chronology
← Previous "Replicants"	Next → "Bears"
- The Bear season 4

"Sophie" is the sixth episode of the fourth season of the American comedy-drama television series The Bear. It is the 34th overall episode of the series and was written and directed by series creator Christopher Storer. It was released on Hulu on June 25, 2025, along with the rest of the season.

The series follows Carmen "Carmy" Berzatto (Jeremy Allen White), an award-winning New York City chef de cuisine, who returns to his hometown of Chicago to run his late brother Michael's failing Italian beef sandwich shop. With the financial backing of his uncle Jimmy (Oliver Platt) and help from his cousin Richie (Ebon Moss-Bachrach), sister Sugar (Abby Elliott), and chef Sydney (Ayo Edebiri), Carmy attempts to remodel the dingy Beef into a warm and hospitable fine-dining destination called the Bear.

In this episode Sydney grapples with her father's cardiac incident, while Carmy holds down the fort at the restaurant, where the crew gets to know Natalie and Pete's baby Sophie and squabble over Tiffany and Frank's upcoming wedding. Reviewers applauded Ayo Edebiri's vulnerable acting performance, as Syd comes to terms with her dad's mortality and her own self-protective perfectionism, while she simultaneously stands at a career crossroads, with the enticements of Shapiro's job offer down one road, and a continued relationship with Carmy and the Berzatto family down the other road. Luca settles into his new role at the Bear, reconnects with Marcus, and begins getting to know the rest of the staff.

== Plot ==
Sydney arrives at the hospital in a panic, but Claire (Molly Gordon) tells her that her father is recovering. Sydney breaks down in tears over her guilt about making her father Emmanuel Adamu (Robert Townsend) worry about her, but Claire comforts her, assuring her that it is a good thing to worry about loved ones. Richie opens up to Jessica (Sarah Ramos) about his insecurities over co-parenting his daughter with Tiff's (Gillian Jacobs) fiancé Frank (Josh Hartnett), and his anxiety about attending her wedding. Albert (Rob Reiner) suggests to Ebraheim (Edwin Lee Gibson) that he turn the Beef window into a franchise. Neil angers Natalie when he says he invited his sister Francie—whom Natalie despises—to Tiff's wedding. Carmy, who is also hesitating going to Tiff's wedding out of fear of seeing Donna (Jamie Lee Curtis), agrees to go after talking to Natalie.

== Production ==
=== Writing ===
Christopher Storer wrote the teleplay for "Sophie."

=== Music ===
The songs used in this episode are "Walking in the Rain" by the Ronettes, "Remember Me" by Otis Redding, "I'm Always In Love" by Wilco, "Hope the High Road" by Jason Isbell & The 400 Unit, and "Stay Young" by Oasis.

== Reception ==
=== Critical reviews ===
The A.V. Club gave the episode a B rating, commending Ayo Edebiri's acting in "an open wound of a monologue that reminds us just how young Syd is; she's so good at projecting cool confidence that it's easy to forget. Decider lamented Sweeps and Tina being "lost in the woods of secondary character plotlessness." Vulture rated it four out of five stars, commending the well-developed work family dynamic as a backdrop for Syd's anxiety about her family-family: "When she started working at the Original Beef, she thought it was a job. While she acknowledged that restaurant life could be all-consuming, I don't think she necessarily realized how much Berzatto drama or even Berzatto-adjacent love she'd be subjected to on a daily basis. And I don't know that she's come to terms with the fact that she's been sort of absorbed into their clan, whether she likes it or not. If she leaves, it won't be seen as just a work decision. It'll feel personal, and while I think she knows that to some extent, I don't think she realizes how big a place she holds in everyone's hearts."

Substream magazine commended an "extremely emotionally touching performance from Ayo Edebiri" and wrote that "...it's sad to witness Syd come apart in that way, because she's doing the best she can...The conversation between Syd and Emmanuel is beautiful because he's giving her the fatherly reassurance she needs still. Carmy is still trying to find out the best way to show up for her. In their call, he even says he'd leave and come to the hospital. That overture is different than what we've experienced with Carmy in the past...There is more to be said between them, but that 'I appreciate you' from Syd to Carmy hit hard. It shakes him in a good way."
