= Sundae (The Bear) =

- The Bear episode
- Episode no.: Season 2 Episode 3
- Directed by: Joanna Calo
- Written by: Karen Joseph Adcock; Catherine Schetina
- Cinematography by: Chloe Weaver
- Editing by: Nia Imani; Joanna Naugle
- Production code: XCBV2003
- Original release date: June 22, 2023
- Running time: 26 minutes

Guest appearances
- Edwin Lee Gibson as Ebraheim; Molly Gordon as Claire; CG as Nayia; José Cervantes as Angel; Richard Esteras as Manny; Annabelle Toomey as Eva; Angelo Dolojan as Kasama waiter; Joel German as angry chef; Camille Grandjean as Kasama cashier; Claire McDonald as general manager; Rob Levitt as himself; Donnie Madia as himself; Dylan Patel as himself; David Posey as himself; Daniel Wat as himself; Eric Wat at himself

Episode chronology
← Previous "Pasta"	Next → "Honeydew"
- The Bear season 2

"Sundae" is the third episode of the second season of the American television comedy-drama The Bear. It is the 11th overall episode of the series and was written by Karen Joseph Adcock and Catherine Schetina, and directed by executive producer Joanna Calo. It was released on Hulu on June 22, 2023, along with the rest of the season.

The series follows Carmen "Carmy" Berzatto, an award-winning New York City chef de cuisine, who returns to his hometown of Chicago to run his late brother Michael's failing Italian beef sandwich shop. In the episode, Sydney visits different restaurants to try dishes, while Carmy starts spending time with Claire.

The episode received critical acclaim, with Ayo Edebiri receiving praise for her performance.

== Plot ==
At an Al-Anon meeting, Carmy (Jeremy Allen White) opens up about his plans for the restaurant. He is not intent on finding time for fun or amusement, as he has been feeling stressed out. Later, he is called by Claire (Molly Gordon), who got his real number from Fak. She asks for help in moving her mother's stuff, and Carmy actually accepts.

As they need to get out of their routine and sample food at other restaurants for their menu, Carmy and Sydney (Ayo Edebiri) make plans to visit restaurants across the city. However, Carmy is unable to accompany Sydney due to helping Claire, so Sydney is forced to do the trip by herself. She also exchanges some conversations with some of her colleagues in the restaurants, with one remarking that she needs a partner to work with. She calls Marcus at the restaurant and asks if anyone called about jobs. She says there's something she wants to talk to him about later. He says "Looking forward!" and afterward is embarrassed because he thinks it was an awkward thing to say. While exhausted, she eventually comes up with a pasta dish from all the different dishes she tried during the day.

It's dark outside when she returns to The Bear, carrying a bag of takeout food and apparently expecting Marcus answer the door. Carmy answers instead, to her surprise: "What are you doing here?" His usually spotless white T-shirt is covered in stains. She discovers that Carmy and the staff have removed a wall due to space concerns upsetting Sydney due to lack of communication. With a colleague's help, Sydney cooks the pasta dish at a restaurant, but when she tastes it, she finds it revolting.

== Reception ==
=== Critical reviews ===
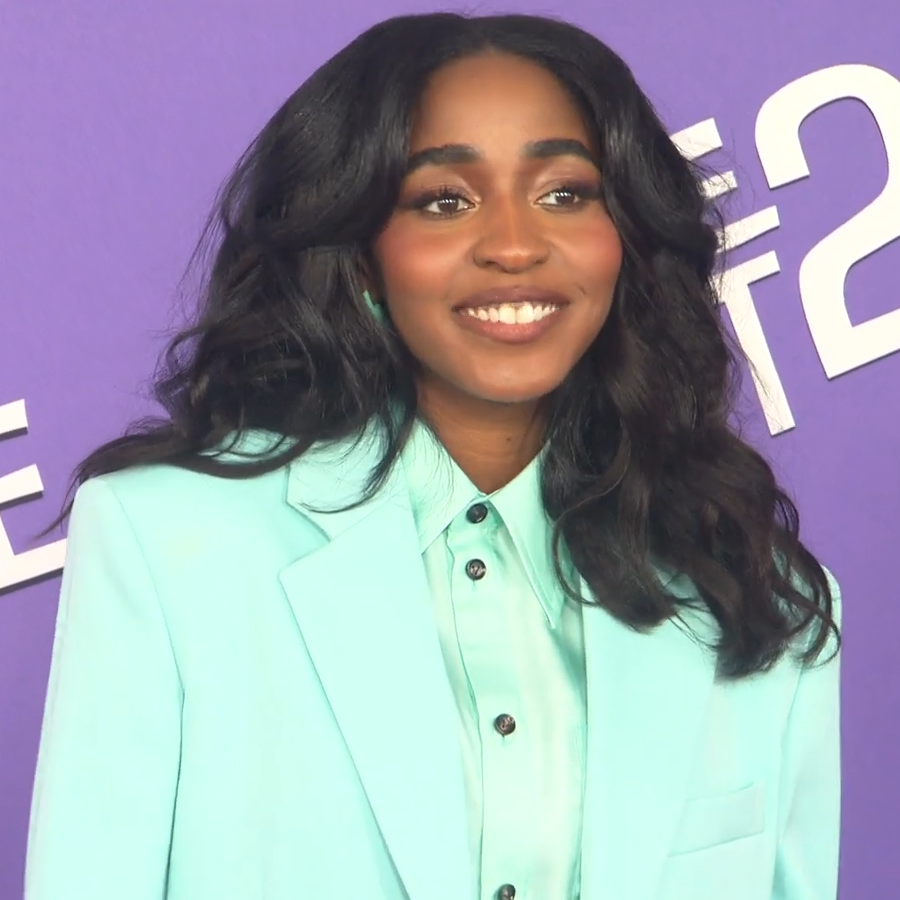
Ayo Edebiri received critical acclaim for her performance and a nomination for the Primetime Emmy Award for Outstanding Lead Actress in a Comedy Series.

"Sundae" received critical acclaim. Marah Eakin of Vulture gave the episode a perfect 5 star out of 5 rating and wrote, "Has any fictional show made its city's food scene look better than The Bear's? Granted, that's not hard with Chicago, which has not just some of the best fine dining in the whole country but also some of the best street staples, counter classics, and everyday fare. That's made pretty clear in 'Sundae,' which is not just a great episode of TV but also a showcase for some of the city's most down-home and delicious eateries."

A.J. Daulerio of Decider wrote, "She's about to plate her food, swirling the green splatter she daydreamed about earlier. She takes a bite. BLECH. She's facing a real dilemma and wonders if she's destined for a life of flagging down airplanes." Arnav Srivastava of The Review Geek gave the episode a 4 star rating out of 5 and wrote, "The world from Sydney's eyes seems so different. Episode 3 of The Bear's new season experiments with storytelling with a fresh twist." Karl R De Mesa from Show Snob wrote, "this is absolutely a great episode for the character development of Sydney, letting the viewer get to know her in different situations and lights, especially the way she needs to control events that usually spiral out of control. It's a big fear response and she defaults to it unconsciously."

Rafa Boladeras of MovieWeb named the episode as the fifth best of the season, writing "This is a great Ayo Edeberi episode; one that tries to illustrate how creativity works, while also planting a seed of distrust between her and Carmy, as most of those incredible cooks she visits warn her about what some bad partners can do to your career and restaurant." Jasmine Blu of TV Fanatic named the episode as the fifth best of the season, writing "It was one of Ayo Edebiri's strongest installments and gave us more insight into Sydney and how others in the culinary world perceive her outside of that of The Bear through this mouthwatering food tour throughout Chicago."

Salon.com commented that a storyline where the female lead of a TV show eats her way around Chicago was an important blow against diet culture. Moreover, per columnist Grace Pau, "The soundtrack indicates that this is not a case of stress or comfort eating, but an act of joy. First, exuberant electronic music, 'Secret Teardrop' by Martin Rev, plays right before she eats, followed by the jaunty track, '25 Miles' by Edwin Starr, as she embarks on her food tour of the city. Then, she dreams of dishes to the buoyant and ambient song, 'Future Perfect' by Durutti Column and chows down to the energetic tune of 'To Make You Happy' by Tommy McGee."

=== Accolades ===
Award	Category	Nominee(s)	Result	Ref.
Primetime Emmy Awards	Outstanding Lead Actress in a Comedy Series	Ayo Edebiri	Nominated	

== Sources ==
- Nikolova, Zlatina (July 2025). "'Every second counts': Urban affect and culinary chaos in The Bear". The Journal of Popular Television. 13 (1): 43–59. doi:10.1386/jptv_00135_1. ISSN 2046-9861.
