= Sydney Adamu =

Main character, The Bear TV series

- The Bear character
- Ayo Edebiri as Sydney in "Bears"
- First appearance: "System"; June 23, 2022
- Last appearance: "The Original Beef of Chicagoland"; June 25, 2026
- Created by: Christopher Storer
- Portrayed by: Ayo Edebiri

In-universe information
- Nicknames: Syd; Ma; Chef; Jeff; Baby
- Occupation: chef; restaurateur; former catering business owner; former UPS driver
- Family: Emmanuel Adamu (father)

Sydney Adamu is a fictional character on the FX Network television series The Bear. Created by Christopher Storer and played by Ayo Edebiri, Sydney is a formally trained chef who joins the crew at the sandwich restaurant the Original Beef of Chicagoland as a sous chef because of her admiration for the newly installed owner, acclaimed chef Carmy Berzatto (Jeremy Allen White). Over the course of the series, Edebiri becomes a co-lead of the show alongside White. Sydney is an only child, raised by her father Emmanuel Adamu (Robert Townsend), who was made a widower when Sydney was young and was thus a single dad. Edebiri has been awarded a Best Supporting Actress Emmy and a Best Actress in a Television Comedy Golden Globe for her depiction of the rising star chef.

== Casting ==
Storer had Edebiri top of mind for the part during the development of the show. Edebiri was a writer and castmember on Dickinson when Storer was hired to direct two episodes. She read for the role over video call from New York City; she never tested opposite White. Casting director Jeanie Bacharach said in 2026 there was a chemistry read via Zoom.

== Career ==
Trained at the Culinary Institute of America, Sydney is a "rising luminary within her profession," young, Black, "unapologetically ambitious," assertive, tenacious, an icon of "female desirability," creative, a generally astute businesswoman, and "immensely intelligent." Sydney's goals, as listed at the top of her résumé, are "to obtain a chef's position with the possibility of creative freedoms and the opportunity for management" and "to respect the wisdom of traditional cuisines through a modern lens." Syd's training and work experience includes cooking school at the Culinary Institute of America (CIA) in Hyde Park, New York, and stints at Smoque, Avec, and Alinea. Smoque opened in 2006 and specializes in barbecue. Avec opened in 2004 and is run by Donnie Madia and chef Dylan Patel. Alinea is a Michelin-starred Chicago restaurant headed by Grant Achatz.

After putting herself through culinary school as a driver for United Parcel Service (UPS), she worked at a series of high-end Chicago restaurants before opening her own catering business. Sheridan Road Catering, which was seemingly a sole proprietorship, ultimately failed, leaving her with a credit score of "negative one million." (Her financial situation presumably did not improve when the Beef became the Bear because she, Carm, and Nat all agreed to defer compensation for six months while the restaurant got underway.) One member of the production team joked in 2023, "...Sydney's bad with money. That's why she's in the position she's in."

She can be envious and immature (as summarized by Carmy, she is intelligent, ambitious, impatient, and green), and one character critique argued that, "Deep down, what she wants is to supplant her idol...Yes, she wants [to be] and believes she is already on an equal footing with Carmy, a chef who already has a Michelin star on his CV...taking offense when he changes her creations or replaces them with his own." Vogue described her in a cover story on Edebiri as "hyper-competent, superdriven, rather anxious." Syd's ambition sits within the context of her intrinsic populism and nurturing personality, according to Salon.com columnist Grace Pau: The authoritative but fundamentally anti-authoritarian Sydney defies "the patriarchal model her Hollywood forbears set forth. Nevermind the fact that it's rare to see women lead kitchens that aren't domestic, Sydney does so as a woman of color, and she does it with compassion. She is the one who opposed Carmy's suggestion of implementing the hierarchical French brigade method in season one. She is the one who heartwarmingly sees the skill and potential in Tina (Liza Colón-Zayas), promoting her to sous chef, which in turn inspires Tina's own self-confidence."

Initially brought in to stage, and then hired as a sous chef at the Beef, Sydney brought more than culinary acumen to the restaurant, as she was also broadly emotionally stable and behaviorally well-adjusted, whereas her boss Carmy (Jeremy Allen White) and his "cousin" Richie Jerimovich (Ebon Moss-Bachrach) are prone to tempestuously cursing each other out, and Syd promptly becomes the central figure in Carmy's push to transform the family restaurant he inherited from his late brother into the Bear, a respectable, hospitable, and profitable fine-dining restaurant in Chicago's River North neighborhood. The pair, Syd and Carm, seemingly find an immediate "camaraderie" amidst the chaos of the Beef. As phrased by one academic study of the challenges of translating the sometimes "derogatory and sexualised" idiomatic English-language expressions found in The Bear dialogue, "As newcomers, Carmy and Sydney are unable to mingle with the local kitchen crew members. Their professional expertise allows them to cooperate and contest...[in] the kitchen—where lived experiences and practices converge to create everyday interactions that are not inclusive and accessible to everyone in that particular place." By the fourth episode of the series, set a couple of months into the story, Sydney is established as not just the most talented chef in Carmy's employ but a "trusted confidant."

By season 3, although Sydney had been promoted rapidly at The Bear, "Syd was offered the career of her dreams by Chef Adam, but she would have to leave The Bear to accept this offer. The position would make Syd the true creative food director she yearns to be, as she feels overshadowed and overlooked by Carmy at The Bear. She was silently weighing her options, and how to tell Carmy about the offer, which led her to finally breaking down outside of a house party she was hosting at her new apartment." Shapiro continued pursuing Sydney in season 4, and after a long conversation with her little cousin, Sydney determined that "making things work with Carmy would be more satisfying for her personally, but for professional reasons she picks Shapiro. That choice—which she does not reveal to her co-workers—hangs over the next few episodes, shadowing even the moments when things seem to be trending up for the restaurant. Then Sydney rethinks things again when she is further convinced of the importance of her work family by a conversation with Carmy's estranged mother, Donna (Jamie Lee Curtis)." For his part, Carmy had noticeably changed his behavior in season 4, especially in regard to Syd "to whom he finally offers his time and attention after a season spent steamrolling her ideas and sidelining her voice." Sydney ultimately called Shapiro from the lakefront with news of her decision to "stay at Bear." Shapiro took the news "poorly." At the end of season 4, Carmy hands over total control of the restaurant to Sydney, telling her she is the Bear, which means "...her place in the restaurant is secure. It's challenging for her, as she's relatively new to the industry, despite her evident potential. She looks up to Carmy, and even mentioned in season 4 that his meal in New York was the best she'd ever had. Finding one's place in a collaborative partnership can be difficult enough as it is, but when it's under one's idol, self-esteem issues aren't uncommon. I'm hopeful that The Bear season 5 will begin to reveal a more confident side of Sydney, preparing her to be the leader the restaurant needs. She's the future..."

According to culinary producer Courtney Storer, "[Ayo Edebiri] is the most courageous, brave, strong person. I wish I could have channeled her in so many kitchens, early on. I was brave, but Ayo just has a different energy of confidence. I could show her something once, and she had it. She's a very quick learner, and it was amazing to see. We first made the omelette at my house, and she did it perfectly the first time. Then on set, she did it perfectly again. She has a very natural ability."

At the end of season 5, 16 months after joining the Beef as Carmy Berzatto's sous, the family restaurant they reformed from sloppy sandwich bar to fine-dining destination the Bear (assisted by the existing Beef staff, Faks, business manager Sugar, and other Bears) is awarded two Michelin stars.

=== "Green": Ina Garten and empty-theater nightmares ===
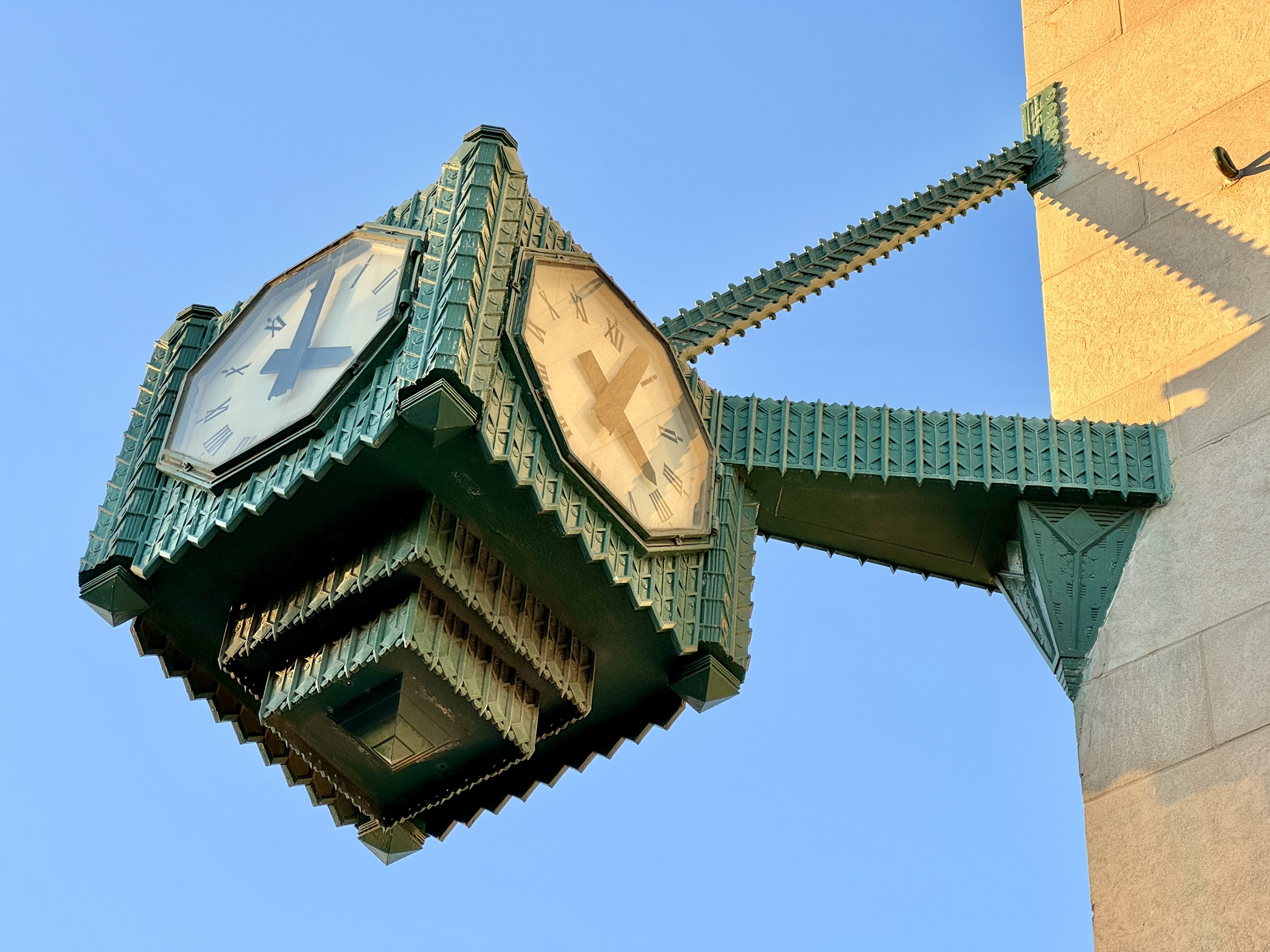
Clock at the 1928 Marshall Field Building in Oak Park, Illinois

The episode "Green" begins with a dream sequence where Sydney appears as an Ina Garten-esque television-host version of herself. The beginning of the dream is similar to Carmy's cooking show nightmare from "Braciole." The title sequence of Sydney's televised kitchen nightmare features a Barefoot Contessa-inspired Hamptons beach romp. Syd channels Garten with a "tendency to overestimate her viewer's time and resource availability," and "off-the-cuff references to high-end materials and ingredients." During her Ina Garten nightmare, Sydney is wearing a Ralph Lauren half-zip cashmere sweater.

Most of the kitchenware is white-enameled, and the set decoration includes three kinds of salt (Diamond Crystal, Maldon, sel de mer); a blue teddy bear starts out on the shelf and ends up soaking wet on the floor. After the Ina Garten sequence, the sound of a Lux-brand "long-ring minute minder" buzzes Sydney from the cooking show into another setting, equally distressing. She finds herself standing alone and exposed on the stage of either the Music Box Theatre, or the Chicago Theatre. The soundtrack leaves behind Ina's classical-music theme song for "instrumental music that transforms Sydney's culinary fantasy into a confused and anxiety-ridden experience."

== Relationships ==
=== Marcus ===
Marcus (Lionel Boyce) and Sydney grew close quickly, and Marcus seemed to ask Sydney on a date just before the soft launch of the restaurant. Boyce told an interviewer in 2024, "I think they're friends. They started as friends and then it's like things get in close proximity...that's just a human thing where you're like, I have chemistry with this person. Are we friends? Are we not friends? It's a weird thing, but they found a way to navigate through it."

=== Carmy ===
Both Syd and Carmy express, in characteristically distinct ways, the show's message that food is often a "tangible expression of love and tenderness." Carmy and Sydney have a deeply intimate and equally fraught partnership, and "she asserts a brand of female partnering we rarely get to see in popular culture. When Carmy flubs, Sydney challenges him. When she has better ideas, she speaks up. She recognizes his immaturity, selfishness and even his demons, and rarely lets him off the hook. She knows what he's capable of and holds him to a commensurate standard." The pair are both partners and opponents throughout the series: "Carmy is set in contrast to the sous chef Sydney, a young African American woman who demonstrates the creativity and decisiveness to lead the restaurant into its new iteration. However, not only does Carmy fail to support Sydney as an equal partner: whenever he feels overwhelmed, his violent temper threatens to undo the positive changes they have achieved." Still, he has a knack for soothing her anxiety and fear of failure, as when he reassures her and boosts her confidence in a quiet conversation in a private nook in the dining room right before the restaurant's soft open, in what has been called "one of the most memorable scenes in the series." By season 3, Carmy is so dependent on Sydney's leadership that he offers her an ownership stake in the business as an enticement to remain on staff, but simultaneously his "reckless, selfish choices are destroying what little stability Sydney has in her life, not to mention rotting away her self-confidence; Carmy offering her co-ownership of the Bear is empty legal terminology." There is a subtext to the offer that complicates Syd's decision-making process: "What is a contract if not a kind of marriage?...All those close-ups...are tiles in a broader mosaic telling the story of the bond between family and legacy. The Bear has established that Carmy and Syd share a love expressed in dedication and commitment, and stretched meals over multiple seasons by cracking, shattering, and repairing those foundations." Their communication in the kitchen has been praised as one of the most realistic parts of the show; Barcelona chef Pablo Lagrange told El País in 2025, "What impresses me most [about the show] is the detail in how the team operates: the communication, the awkward silences, the unspoken hierarchies, how they dodge each other, how they coordinate, how they speak without speaking."

Carmy's tendency to self-sabotage ultimately becomes beside the point because while he was the center of attention, Sydney became the heart and soul of the restaurant, having earned the loyalty and devotion of the staff (many of whom are Carmy's relatives) and experienced a personal creative peak despite Carm's neglect. In the meantime she considers a job offer from Adam Shapiro, a former colleague of Carmy's at a fictionalized version of Chicago's acclaimed Ever, tentatively accepting but then ultimately choosing to stay at the Bear. According to one scholarly analysis, Syd's emotional and professional ascent through the Berzatto family restaurant ultimately establishes her as the narrative's second-most important character. In 2025, The New York Times described Edebiri as "essentially a co-lead with White."

Still, as recounted by Rolling Stone television critic Alan Sepinwall, while Syd "loves everyone at The Bear...she came there for Carmy. On the occasions when he's able to get his various neuroses under control, he's an incredible partner who makes Syd feel better about herself than even her beloved father can. And when he's failing at that, at least she can console herself with the understanding that the good version of Carmy will make an appearance sooner or later." In the season-4 finale "Goodbye" Carmy told Sydney "because you're the bear," a claim about which he seemed quite certain but the meaning of which has been debated.

In season 5, Sydney feels the need to modify the exclamation "Fuck me" with "Just kidding." The show explicitly nods to the idea of a romantic pairing twice—Sydney's little cousin charges her with having a crush on Carmy after she babbles about how it's "low-key an honor" to work with him and having a "bed" in his family's restaurant, and when Carmy's mom asks if the pair are dating, Pete (Chris Witaske) admits "there are some theories." Their relationship was left ambiguous and up to the audience's imagination if they'd pursue something romantic or not, but Collider wrote that season 5 Sydney and Carmy "may not have kissed or gotten together at this point in their lives, but the relationship they share is more complex and emotionally mature than any other on the show. These two characters are intrinsically connected—both narratively and by choice—and their dynamic will always be a core part of The Bear's legacy." A blackasf.com columnist wrote that pair had been "intimately entangled in the soul-baring intensity of kitchen work. [But] she isn't his reward, his savior, or the woman waiting at the end of his emotional breakthrough. She's his collaborator. The person standing beside him in the difficult, unglamorous, obsessive work of trying to make something great. When strong-willed, self-determined women, particularly women of color, are allowed to be symbols of female desirability without being made smaller, the culture shifts a little. When women who follow their callings are treated as just as admirable as women who follow their hearts, we all win."

=== Richie ===
Syd and Richie spent much of season 1 at each other's throats. Syd eventually (accidentally) stabbed Richie. But in the time since, Syd and Richie have revealed "a similar sensitivity when dealing with Carmy's impulsive whims and the fallout of his unresolved struggles...A major reason Richie has been able to grow is because Sydney sees potential in him—something he initially couldn't see in himself. The two have grown so comfortable around each other that it's Sydney who stands by Richie outside...Tiff and Frank's wedding...With the season four finale placing Sydney, Richie, and Natalie in a partnership without Carmy on board, they'll have to rely on each other more than ever."

=== Adam Shapiro ===
Shapiro pursues Sydney beginning in season 3, and brings with him more of the complicated power dynamics and the intimacy of cooking and eating with a chef. Shapiro first approached Sydney at the L train stop for the Bear restaurant on or about July 7, 2023, and told her "God, I probably shouldn't tell you this. I know it's early, but I snuck into the Bear...two weeks ago." At that time, Shapiro told her, "There was a scallop dish that was lights-out...it felt really new...Like, uh, not Carmy." Syd replied, "It was both of us together, so..."

He invited her to Doma Café the first week of August and asked if she would consider being his chef de cuisine, and reiterated the offer on August 6, the day of the Ever funeral. He told her the salary would be $80,000 a year, $10,000 more than they were offering at the Bear. (Doma is Ayo Edebiri's favorite restaurant to eat at in Chicago.) On Sunday, September 17, he called her on her day off and invited her to visit his restaurant. She toured the space, and after talking to her little cousin T.J. about it, she called him because "I wanted to know if you wanted to go over, like, some paperwork?" She changed her mind and turned him down on approximately Monday, October 2, following the Bear family wedding.

=== Other relationships ===
Sydney was initially hazed and sabotaged by line cook Tina Marrero (Liza Colón-Zayas), and sexually harassed and generally undermined by Richie. She ultimately won them over, accidentally stabbing Richie in the ass along the way. She is now both close friends with them both, protecting Tina from Carmy's exacting standards and ultimately promoting Richie to a long-deserved status within the family hierarchy. Syd is an excellent and patient mentor to younger or less experienced staffers. According to Colón-Zayas, Tina is "in love with her [restaurant] family," not least because of the mutual devotion between her and Syd, whom she sometimes calls "Ma." Among other projects, Syd has developed the Beef's runner, Gary "Sweeps" Woods (Corey Hendrix) into a skilled sommelier who trained with Syd's onscreen friend, real-life Chicago sommelier Alpana Singh. Sweeps has become adept at picking "perfect" wine pairings for dishes at the Bear while "strong" wine sales become a major source of revenue for the fragile restaurant. Syd encouraged Carmy's older sister, Natalie "Sugar" Berzatto (Abby Elliott) to join the Bear as the restaurant's business manager; the two women have developed a close relationship in their own right, with Nat ultimately deeming Syd a more reliable leader than her own brother. Nonetheless Edebiri has described her character as a "bad communicator."

As emphasized in the episode "Worms," co-written by Edebiri and fellow castmember Lionel Boyce, Sydney's dedication to the Beef and then the Bear over the course of the series leads Sydney to neglect her personal life outside of work. Over the course of seasons three and four, Syd becomes increasingly remote from her dad, with whom she lived at the beginning of the series and with whom she has always been close. Her father is protective of his daughter and expresses concern about the "flimsy" partnership deal being offered by the Berzattos. As one pop-culture podcast put it, "She's vulnerable and desperately trying not to be vulnerable."

=== Sydney and Coach K ===
Sydney's Coach K book, Leading With the Heart, an encouraging gift from her dad, first appears in "Sundae," and her server at Kasama summarizes the content: "Courage and confidence lead to decision making." Over the course of the season, Syd "becomes increasingly engrossed ...despite not really knowing who Coach K is." Coach K grew up in Chicago and has fond memories of Chicago's Polish Broadway, the area "near Wicker Park that was once a hub for Polish restaurants and businesses." Coach Krzyzewski's dad was in the restaurant business; he ran a breakfast spot for factory workers in Little Village, and later a bar called Cross' Tavern in the Lower West Side neighborhood. In 2024, Krzyzewski told Eater Chicago that he still eats a kind of Polish sausage called krakowska, and that he resonates with The Bear because "...they know in order to seek excellence you need everybody on the team seeking it and working as one. There's a lot of pressure in those kitchens."

In "Honeydew," Marcus sees her book on their video call and mentions "the greatest comeback of all time" to Sydney, a reference to the 2001 tournament conference finals. Sydney wonders, "Why are you saying his name like he's Martin Luther King Jr.?" During the opening scene of "Forks," construction workers install the booths in the Bear dining room intercut with a Coach K interview while Sydney works on a dish involving prawns. The same Carbinero prawns appeared in her food brainstorm montage in "Sheridan" and are eventually incorporated into a key dish at the newly opened Bear. The interview refers to Krzyzewski's college education at the United States Military Academy, one of the American service academies, and "a big part of picking Coach K was that he served in the military. And, obviously, there's a big theme in this year about service and acts of service."

On the train home in "Bolognese," Syd watches footage of the famous Duke versus Maryland game in 2001. Duke men's basketball came from behind in the last minute of the game to push the game to overtime and ultimately win. The game, considered a great sports comeback, is known as the Miracle Minute game, which ties to the show's ongoing "every second counts" motif. In "Omelette," the morning of the day they open the restaurant, Sydney tapes a picture of Coach K to the expo station and decorates it with stickers that include a white dog wearing sunglasses, a spoon and fork, a black cat wearing a blue apron, an old-fashioned analog clock with alarm bells, and a sticker that reads "Don't over think it." In "The Bear," Syd's season of being coached by Mike Krzyzewski pays off. In the words of the News & Observer of Raleigh, North Carolina: "While the camera fixes on Sydney's face, a series of images quickly flash across the screen, including Sydney's be-stickered photo of Coach K. She keeps her composure, makes some decisions, and gets the kitchen team back in action. They go on—dare we say it—an exhilarating five-minute run as the kitchen clock ticks down to zero. Victory."

== Family ==
Sydney is an only child, little else about her upbringing has been revealed. Her mother died of lupus when she was four or five years old; she was raised by her dad Emmanuel Adamu (Robert Townsend). Edebiri wanted "multi-hyphenate" Townsend to play the role of her onscreen dad, joking that he had already raised her as the TV dad of The Parent 'Hood, a 1990s WB Network family sitcom, of which Townsend was also an executive producer. Her dad calls her "baby" as a pet name.

Sydney's Coke-braised short ribs were inspired by something her mom used to make. Her mom was "like a Black southern belle," and was an actress, mostly in community theater productions. Her birthday was in March; in season 2, Syd and her dad celebrated her late mom's birthday with dinner and cake. Syd's maternal grandfather was an automobile mechanic.

Her cousin Chantel (Danielle Deadwyler), who lives on the South Side of Chicago, does her hair. Critical response to Deadwyler's Chantel was overwhelmingly positive, with her performance in "Worms" called "extraordinary" and "excellent". Rolling Stone TV critic Alan Sepinwall praised the "chameleonic" Deadwyler for her performance in the "relaxed, confident, funny role." Chantel's husband is Christian, and their kid together is T. J. (Arion King). Sydney also has a cousin Monty who works at Boeing, and an Auntie Marsha, whose house is "energetically musty." Sydney missed Auntie Marsha's most recent birthday party. There also seems to be a cousin Moody, and Emmanuel has twin brothers, Syd's Uncle Red and Uncle Zeke.

Syd's extended family is otherwise undescribed in-universe, and the show tends to focus closely on the Berzatto clan, who work and live on the north side.

== Other attributes ==
=== Style, costume design, and hair ===
According to costume designer Courtney Wheeler, "Sydney's style is...about self-expression and experimentation. She gets a lot of joy from what she wears and putting it together. It's a way to show a little of who she is without speaking. From her passed-down vintage shirts and her bandanas to her more coveted, elevated pieces, she's [always] thinking about composition, something that comes naturally to her and why she's such a great chef." Despite the limitations imposed by her work in an industrial kitchen, Sydney's personal style has been characterized as "pretty damn chic." In the kitchen at the Bear she typically wears chef whites, or a blue apron before service, and an array of head scarves.

Sydney's headscarves caught the attention of the fashion press throughout the run of the show. She changes up her bandanas, and her multiple earrings, almost daily, with the hair wraps being "[sometimes] vintage, others modern; there are batik-looking patterns, ones that look inspired by silk Hermès scarves, and a few that could have been plucked from the MoMA gift shop." As Vogue Singapore commented about her headscarves in 2024 "patchwork paisley designs from Japanese cult brand Kapital to eclectic handmade pieces from smaller boutiques, her fabrics run the gamut and play a constant role in showing her personality despite the kitchen's constraints." Among the scarf brands she's worn are RRL, Mur by Ayca, Eloi, Kapital, Echo New York, Cai & Jo, Printed Image, and One Ear Brand. According to costume designer Courtney Wheeler, Syd's head scarves are a form of personal expression, generally, and as well as a "bit of an instinct to protect [her] hair," as a Black woman specifically. Her multiple earrings are another central component of her look and per Wheeler she tends to go bigger when she is at an emotional crossroads: "She wears a lot of more delicate, smaller pieces. A lot of them are from Catbird. When she gets to dress up a little more, we do like to play more with statement pieces. They're something that she can express herself with. She's always looking for that, even when she's not sure of a life decision that's looming. It's like, Oh yeah, my life might be kind of confusing and I might be having a panic attack later, but at least I look really nice."

In more casual circumstances, she wears vintage T-shirts, some borrowed from the closets of her parents. One fashion blogger wrote that Adamu "regularly dressed in a sophisticated androgyny that encapsulates American workwear. Off-duty, we see her in powder-pink Stüssy carpenter pants, Carhartt overalls, crafty little tees by Bode, and crisp overshirts she probably stole from her father." In regard to Sydney raiding the closets of family members, Wheeler told Complex in 2023, "She does have this sentimental streak about her family and Chicago. I think that all of her T-shirts show that in a way that Carmy's do not." Her casual tops consistently represent her Black identity and/or her Chicago roots, including shirts and sweatshirts from the Chicago Bulls, a jazz festival in Florida, the Blacksonian, the Million Woman March, the Chicago Symphony Orchestra, the Art Institute of Chicago (featuring a Degas ballerina), and the Negro Leagues of American baseball. She also personalizes her clothes such as a "washed black sweatshirt" by Rachel Comey, which the show's tailor hand embroidered.

=== Thom Browne chef whites ===
Carmy gave Sydney chef whites embroidered with her initials as a gift before the restaurant opening. Designer Thom Browne confirmed via Instagram that the whites were a custom design. One Daily Beast column about the chemistry between Syd and Carmen commented that "a Thom Browne chef coat is basically a marriage proposal." According to costume designer Courtney Wheeler, it took four to six months to create the chef whites, and "I'm so glad that they were able to do that. It's so fitting for Sydney. It's such a great gift and kind of shows that Carmy is believing in her, and so it connects their relationship. But also just for the show, for Chris, it's such a full circle moment." One writer commented that the monogrammed chef whites were a big signal of "Carmy's thoughtfulness and how he genuinely wants to recognize Syd's value not only in the restaurant but also in his own life...Carmy want[s] Syd to believe in herself—and him".

The chef whites have "customized with the brand's iconic red, white, and blue stripes on the sleeves" and her initials embroidered on the sleeve. Sydney's red headscarf, previously seen in the season one "Dogs" episode, is the "Tomato Soup" design by One Ear Brand. Sydney debuted the look in the final moments of the episode, garnering good reviews: "The [accent] colors compliment the blue-heavy scenes perfectly, and the red bandanna she wears in her hair with it. She also still carries the same yellow striped hand towels on her apron, making a nice toned-down, cohesive, primary look."

Sydney wore an embroidered Thom Browne shirt on her first day at the restaurant and a different one later in season 1. The chef's jacket was seemingly destroyed when the restaurant basement flooded in season 5; Carmy promised, "We'll get you another one."

=== Key outfits ===
- Puffer: While going to and from the restaurant in "Sheridan," and touring the city in "Sundae," her quilted jacket is the Paloma Wool Hokusai design in smoke green.
- Shapiro breakfast: The outfit Syd wore to the Shapiro meet at Café Doma in "Legacy" was composed of the sailor jacket from the Comme des Garçons Girl SS24 collection, paired with "flowy shorts from Alice + Olivia" and loafers, topped off by a "statement bow" hair barrette "to hold her hair back."
- New York flashback: In the "Tomorrow" flashback where Sydney is presented with the hamachi blood orange dish made by Carmy, she is wearing a "printed midi dress from Dries Van Noten's fall/winter 2018 collection."
- Ever funeral: As described by InStyle, Syd's "funeral" outfit is a "sleek satin shell top with a matching skirt, accessorized with a funky silver necklace, pearl drop earrings, and a black Ganni Bou bag with a braided handle...her most striking yet." Like her Shapiro-meeting outfit in "Legacy," this outfit is something a "public-facing chef would wear," and shows her continuing character growth. Her top was a Warehouse satin twill shell.
- Sydney's day off: Sydney is wearing a Negro Leagues sweatshirt for most of "Worms," sourced by costume designer Courtney Wheeler from "Manny of Goody Vault." Her jacket is possibly vintage Escada. Syd's fractionally undone hair is shielded from Shapiro's gaze by an angled-askew multicolored Susie Kondi Lumi cashmere beanie. Edebiri described this as "the most insane hat of all time."
- Bears wedding: Sydney wore a "really cool water-blurred camo two-piece set" in green and yellow from the Meryll Rogge spring 2024 ready-to-wear collection to Tiffany and Frank's wedding. According to Wheeler, Sydney's dress, like much of the show's wardrobe, was sourced from a vintage resale boutique or thrift shop, in this case, "Blake in Chicago. Shout-out to that store—I love it. They always have the best stuff and a great designer selection. We use them a lot."
- Season 5: Sydney's trench coat is Maison Margiela's "Peached Coat," which retails for £2,150.

=== Hairstyles ===
Syd typically wears her hair in extra-small knotless box braids with gold-tone highlights. In season 2, according the head of the hair department, Ally Vickers, "She did a lot of half-up buns and ponytails, double buns, and I bought her a ton of scrunchies! I love a scrunchie moment, who doesn't?" In the season 3 "Tomorrow" flashback, she has a natural hair look, styled in an Afro. In her season 4 cooking show nightmare, she wears a bob-cut hairstyle.

=== Tattoos ===
Sydney has one tattoo: the three of swords image from the tarot deck, on the back of her right shoulder.

=== Home ===
Syd ran her catering company "out of her garage." When the series began, Sydney lived with her dad; her room was decorated with Paul Bocuse's cookbooks, and two oversized star lights. There are posters for the 1993 action movie Speed and Penny Marshall-directed 1986 action comedy Jumpin' Jack Flash, which Syd watches on her laptop on the Sunday morning when Shapiro calls her at home in "Worms." In season 3 she got her own place, which her dad thought was too expensive for the value and which was a longer commute to work that from his house. He jokingly forbade her from moving back in with him in the episode "Sophie." One Chicago-native reviewer commented, "I can never get a sense of where Sydney lives. Sheridan Road Catering makes me feel like it's in Rogers Park, but then she's making phone calls to Shapiro from what looks like the rocks near the Shedd Aquarium?"

Plant shop, Wicker Park, Chicago

Her new apartment is decorated with houseplants (including a pothos, a calathea, and a tree philodendron), and two framed artworks by photographer Tyler Mitchell—Untitled (Kiki and Stephan Dancing) and Untitled (Group Hula Hoop)—and an unhung framed Daughters of the Dust movie poster. The only memento on Sydney's fridge is a clipping of the review of the Original Beef of Chicagoland that Ebra was reading aloud to the kitchen at the beginning of "Review." The restaurant was given four stars, the reviewer was Rye Denningham of the Chicago Telegraph, and the review opened with the quote, "Somewhere down on Fullerton, There's a place that meant so much to everybody like me," which is a lyric from the song "Somewhere on Fullerton" by Allister. That song once appeared on a list of "top 15 most Chicago songs ever recorded."

=== Soda pop ===
Sydney's primary source of caffeine may be Coca-Cola. Her Coke ribs feature prominently in seasons 1 and 5. In "Doors," Carmy (whom Richie once called a "pop machine" because he made Sprite for Tiff in "Fishes"), makes sure Syd has her apparently customary quart-size deli container of Coke with ice before they start the evening service. Similarly, in season 5, new boss Sydney asks Carmy if he can grab her a bougie glass-bottled Coke from the walk-in, which he does, simultaneously noticing a cache of canned tuna that inspires a tonnato element for their lamb dish.

== See also ==
- List of The Bear characters
- List of The Bear episodes
- Food of The Bear
- Music on The Bear
- Family on The Bear

== Sources ==
- Alter, Rebecca (July 6, 2023). "The Real Chefs Behind The Bear Made Way More Than 7 Fishes". Vulture.
- Bodie, Matthew T. (September 2025). "Employment and Identity". Indiana Law Journal. 101. doi:10.2139/ssrn.5467908. Minnesota Legal Studies Research Paper No. 2025-46.
- Flores Jurado, Julieta (June 27, 2024). "A Fork in the Road? Rethinking Culinary Genius, Power Dynamics, and the Impact of Social Movements on U.S. Food Media and Popular Culture". Norteamérica. 19 (2). doi:10.22201/cisan.24487228e.2024.2.674. ISSN 2448-7228. Archived from the original on 2025-06-21.
- Grazia Serra, Alessandra Olga (May 2024). "The Bear: New (stereotypical) representations of Italian Americans in contemporary television series". Forum Italicum: A Journal of Italian Studies. 58 (1): 114–124. doi:10.1177/00145858231223974. ISSN 0014-5858.
- Haddix, Carol Mighton; Kraig, Bruce; Sen, Colleen Taylor, eds. (2017). The Chicago Food Encyclopedia. Heartland Foodways. Urbana: The University of Illinois Press. ISBN 978-0-252-09977-9. LCCN 2017007883. OCLC 973222701. Project MUSE book 55651.
- Wang, Dingkun (April 2, 2025). "Translating the sensitive content in audiovisual fiction: the expanding case of Chinese subtitling in the streaming era". The Translator. 31 (4): 344–356. doi:10.1080/13556509.2025.2485884. ISSN 1355-6509.
