= Richard Esteras =

American actor (b. 1968)

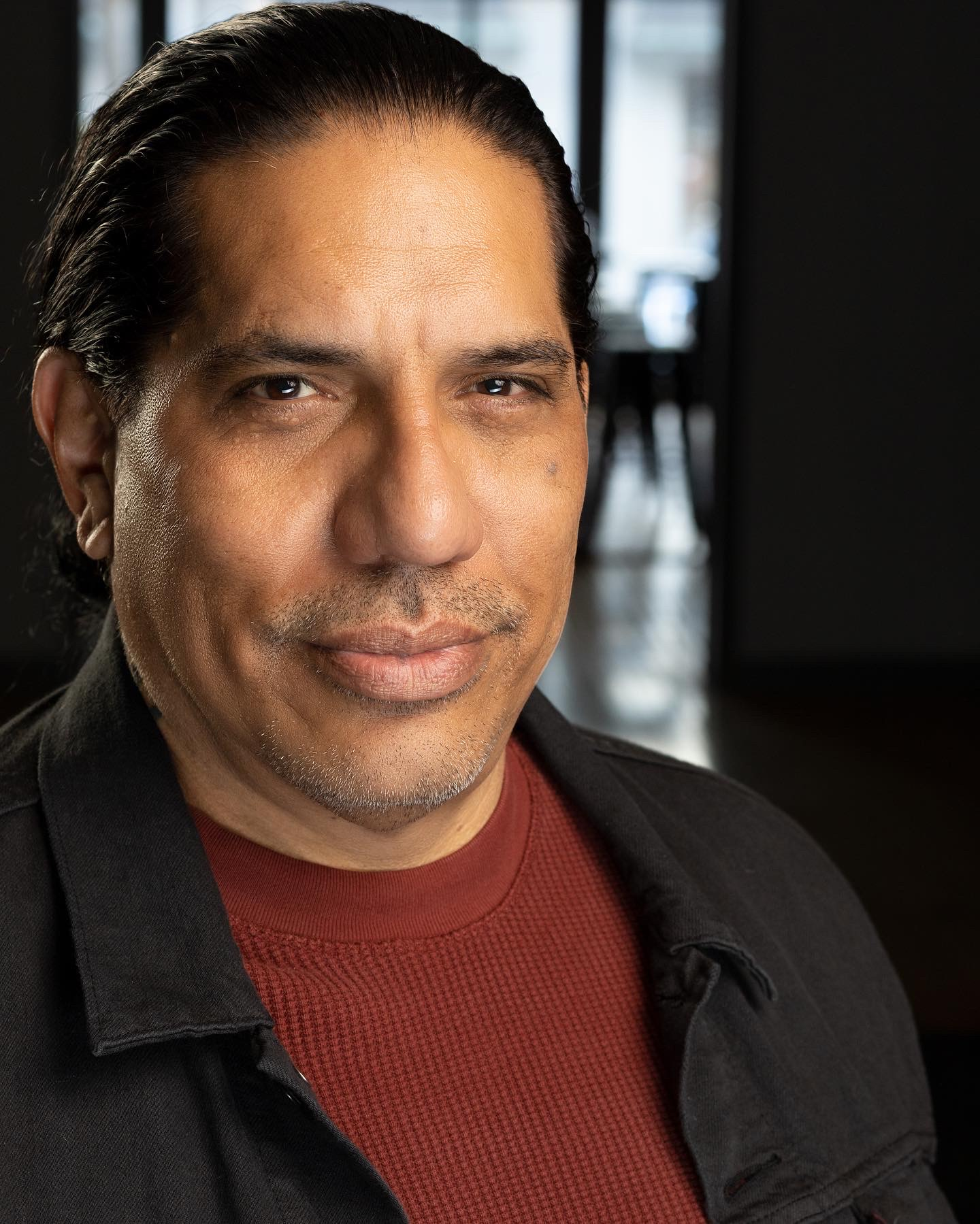
Richard Esteras

Richard Esteras (b. August 25, 1968) is an American actor of Mexican and Puerto Rican heritage. Esteras has played restaurant dishwasher Manny on the FX Networks dramedy The Bear since season one. Raised in Gary, Indiana, after his parents moved there to work in the steel mills, Esteras thought he had a chance as an actor because of his superficial resemblance to Danny Trejo. Esteras appeared in Trejo's horror comedy movie Seven Cemeteries, released in 2024. In 2025, Esteras appeared as Waffles in a Chicago production of Chekov's Uncle Vanya. Esteras shared a Screen Actors Guild Award with the rest of The Bear cast in 2024.

The Bear special "Gary" was set in Esteras' hometown. He posted on Instagram, with Freddie Gibbs' "G.I. Pride" as the attached music, "For the record, I was born in El Paso, Texas. Moved to Gary when I was a year old. My sister, brother, daughter, nephews and grandchildren were all born and raised in Gary. Even my cat Noche was born in Gary lol"
