= Ayo Edebiri =

American actress, comedian, and writer (born 1995)

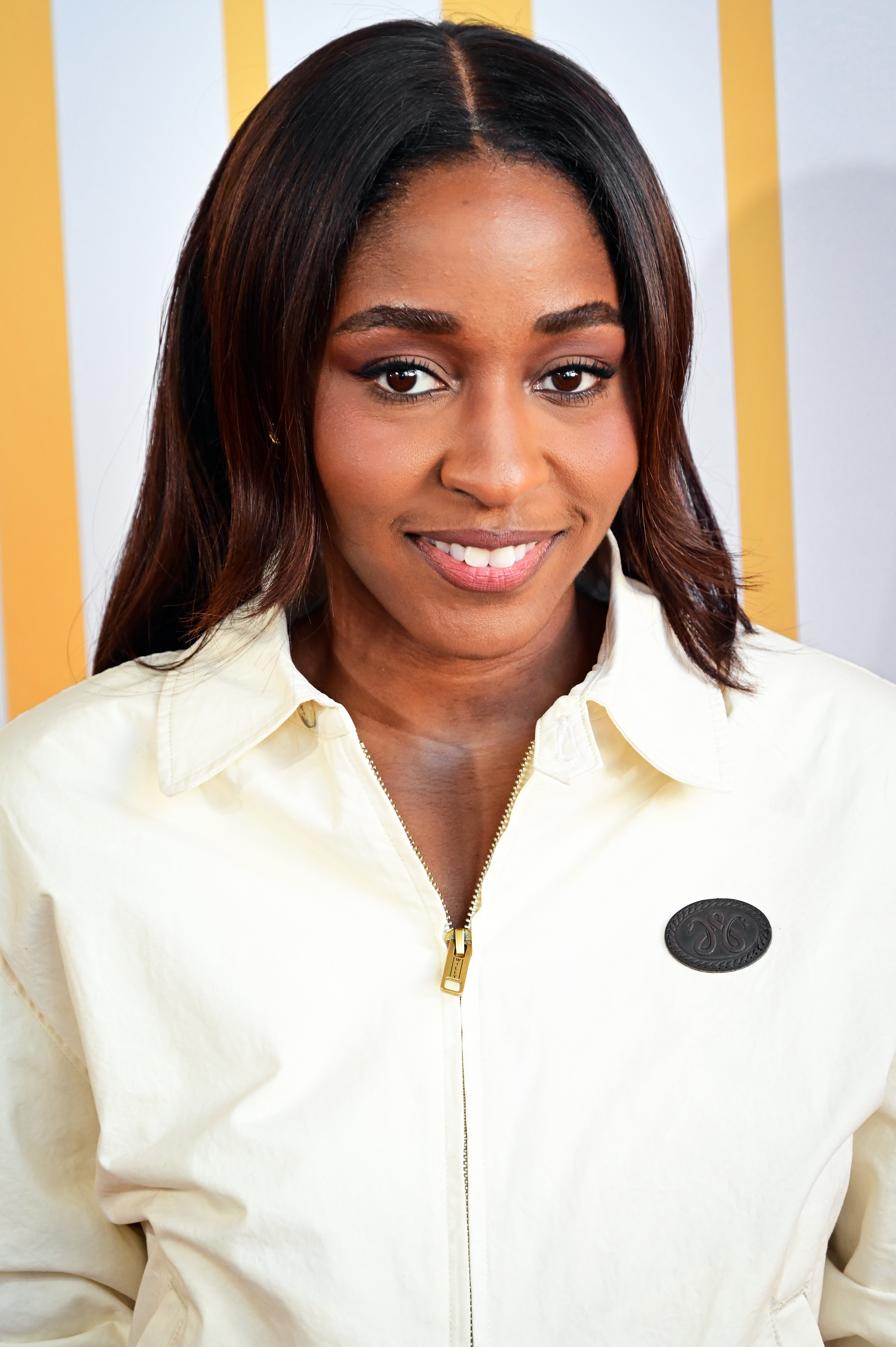
- Edebiri in 2026
- Born: Funmilayo Edebiri; October 3, 1995 (age 31); Boston, Massachusetts, U.S.
- Education: New York University (BFA)
- Occupations: Actress; comedian; television writer
- Years active: 2014–present

Funmilayo "Ayo" Edebiri (/ˈaɪoʊ əˈdɛbəri/ EYE-oh ə-DEB-ər-ee; born, October 3, 1995) is an American actress, comedian, television writer, and director. She played chef Sydney Adamu in the drama series The Bear (2022–2026), for which she won a Golden Globe Award, two Actor Awards, and a Primetime Emmy Award, as well as nominations for a Directors Guild of America Award for directing the episode "Napkins" and Writers Guild of America Award for co-writing "Worms".

As a film actress, she starred in the comedy films Theater Camp and Bottoms (both 2023). In 2025, she followed with the psychological-thrillers Opus and After the Hunt, and the political comedy Ella McCay. She has also voiced roles such as Glory Grant in Spider-Man: Across the Spider-Verse (2023), April O'Neil in Teenage Mutant Ninja Turtles: Mutant Mayhem (2023), and Envy in Inside Out 2 (2024).

On television, she had recurring roles in the Apple TV+ period romance series Dickinson (2021), and the ABC sitcom Abbott Elementary (2023). Edebiri was a writer and voice actor on the Netflix animated adult comedy series Big Mouth from 2020 to 2025 and was a writer for the FX horror comedy series What We Do in the Shadows in 2022.

On stage, she made her Broadway debut in the revival of the David Auburn play Proof (2026).

== Early life and education ==
Edebiri was born in Boston on October 3, 1995, to a Barbadian mother and a father from the Edo ethnic group in Edo State, Nigeria. Short for Funmilayo, her name "Ayo" means "Joy" in Yoruba. She is an only child and grew up in the Dorchester neighborhood. Her family is Pentecostal, and she regularly attended church services with her parents.

She first became interested in comedy through her eighth grade drama class, leading her to join the improv club at Boston Latin School called Yellow Submarine Improv. She went to New York University (NYU), where she initially intended to study teaching before switching her major to dramatic writing. During her junior year of college, Edebiri began pursuing a comedy career and became an intern at the Upright Citizens Brigade (UCB).

== Career ==
=== 2014–2021: Early work ===
In 2014, Edebiri acted in an episode of the series Defectives. She started her career as a stand-up comedian and also performed a stand-up set on Comedy Central's Up Next. Her scripted digital series, Ayo and Rachel Are Single, began airing on Comedy Central in May 2020, which she co-wrote and co-starred in with her friend and fellow comedian Rachel Sennott. Edebiri made her film debut in the 2020 comedy-drama Shithouse in an uncredited role. She co-hosted a podcast called Iconography with Olivia Craighead, in which guests were interviewed about their shared personal icons. The podcast was produced by Forever Dog, and the second season was released in 2020.

As a television writer, Edebiri wrote for the sole seasons of The Rundown with Robin Thede (2017–2018) and NBC's Sunnyside (2019). She joined the writing staff of Big Mouth for the show's fourth season. After Jenny Slate stepped down from voicing the character Missy so the role could be played by a Black actress, Edebiri auditioned and was selected as the replacement in August 2020. Her voice acting as the character began at the end of the show's fourth season. In 2021, she was a writer and actress for Dickinson's second season on Apple TV+, where she first worked with Christopher Storer, who later created The Bear. She acted in a supporting role in the 2022 film adaptation of the Jennifer E. Smith young adult novel, Hello.

=== 2022–2024: Breakthrough and The Bear ===
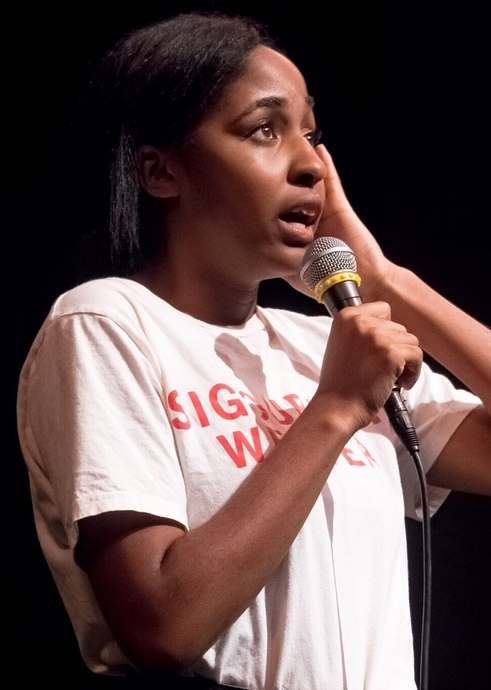
Edebiri in 2018

In 2022, Edebiri gained wider prominence as a main cast member on the FX on Hulu series The Bear. She received a Golden Globe Award, Primetime Emmy Award, and Independent Spirit Award in addition to nominations from the Gotham Awards and the Critics' Choice Awards for her role as Sydney Adamu, an ambitious young sous chef. Lucy Mangan of The Guardian praised her performance, declaring her "magnificent" and "still lighting up and punching up every scene she is in".

Also in 2022, she became a writer and consulting producer on the FX series What We Do in the Shadows, earning a nomination for the Writers Guild of America Award for Best Episodic Comedy for the episode "Private School". Edebiri co-produced, appeared in, and served as a writer on Mulligan (2023), an animated series for Netflix. She provided voice acting as Ham in the Netflix interactive special We Lost Our Human. That February, Edebiri contributed original poetry to Eating Salad Drunk, a comedian haiku anthology (edited by author Gabe Henry) that benefited Comedy Gives Back, a nonprofit supporting comedians facing financial hardship from the Covid-19 pandemic. In the same year, she appeared in an episode of the Mel Brooks Hulu series History of the World, Part II and the Netflix Black Mirror episode "Joan Is Awful". She also voiced roles in the Disney Channel series Kiff and the Max series Clone High. Later in 2023, she voiced Glory Grant in the animated superhero sequel Spider-Man: Across the Spider-Verse and April O'Neil in the animated Teenage Mutant Ninja Turtles: Mutant Mayhem. Both films were financially successful.

In 2023, she starred in the mockumentary comedy film Theater Camp alongside Molly Gordon and Ben Platt. The film premiered at the Sundance Film Festival to positive reviews, with many comparing it to the films of Christopher Guest. Later that year, she guest starred in the ABC sitcom Abbott Elementary and starred in the teen sex comedy Bottoms opposite Rachel Sennott. Bottoms premiered at South by Southwest. Katie Walsh of The Los Angeles Times wrote, "Sennott and Edebiri deliver two of the funniest performances of the year". She also appeared in the film The Sweet East, directed by Sean Price Williams, which premiered at the 2023 Cannes Film Festival at the Directors' Fortnight. She won the Primetime Emmy Award for Outstanding Supporting Actress in a Comedy Series in 2024 for The Bear, as Quinta Brunson won the Primetime Emmy Award for Outstanding Lead Actress in a Comedy Series for Abbott Elementary that same year, marking the first year two Black actresses won the two female comedy acting categories in the Primetime Emmys. Edebiri made her directorial debut in The Bear's season three episode "Napkins" (2024). To train for communicating with the crew, she shadowed the director of the flashback episode "Fishes", in which her character did not appear. She was nominated for a Directors Guild of America Award for Outstanding Directing – Comedy Series for the episode.

Edebiri at the 2025 New York Film Festival

Edebiri hosted Saturday Night Live (SNL) with musical guest Jennifer Lopez in 2024. In a sketch, Edebiri indirectly acknowledged having criticized Lopez previously on the podcast Scam Goddess. She voiced Envy in the Pixar film Inside Out 2 (2024), a sequel to the first film. Edebiri also appeared as a crazed woman in the music video for Tyler, The Creator's 2024 single, "Noid".

=== 2025–present: Career expansion ===
In February 2025, she directed the music video for Clairo's song, "Terrapin", which starred "Weird Al" Yankovic. Edebiri starred in the 2025 A24 horror film Opus, co-starring John Malkovich, and Luca Guadagnino's thriller film After the Hunt (2025), with Julia Roberts and Andrew Garfield. She played a supporting role in James L. Brooks's comedy film Ella McCay. In February 2025, it was announced that Edebiri was in talks to star in and write a film based on the children's television show Barney & Friends for A24, Mattel Films, and producer Daniel Kaluuya.

For season three of The Bear, Edebiri received an Emmy nominations for Outstanding Lead Actress in a Comedy Series and for Outstanding Directing for a Comedy Series. This makes her the first Black woman ever to be nominated for acting and directing in the comedy categories in the same year. Additionally, she is the youngest Black woman in Emmy history to receive three acting nominations. She is also only the second Black woman to be nominated for comedy directing, after Millicent Shelton for 30 Rock in 2009. Edebiri also co-wrote the acclaimed season four episode of The Bear, "Worms", which was named one of the top 10 TV episodes of the year by The Hollywood Reporter, while TheWrap named Edebiri to its list of the top 10 TV performers of 2025. Edebiri and Lionel Boyce were nominated for an WGA Award for Episodic Comedy for "Worms".

Nigerian filmmakers Arie Esiri and Chuko Esiri cast Edebiri in Clarissa, their adaptation of the Virginia Woolf novel Mrs Dalloway, which was filmed 2025 in Lagos. Edebiri made her Broadway debut in the revival of the David Auburn play Proof, acting opposite Don Cheadle, Jin Ha, and Kara Young. She received mixed reviews for her performance. Deadline Hollywood described her turn as Catherine as "transfixing" and a "revelation." The Guardian wrote that Edebiri leaned heavily on "a jumble of stammers and tics that increasingly isolate us from Catherine's humanity". Edebiri was nominated for a 2026 Drama League award in the category of Distinguished Performance.

Upcoming

In May 2026, it was announced that Edebiri would be voice acting for Bong Joon Ho's first animated film, Ally, along with Alex Jayne Go, Bradley Cooper, Dave Bautista, Finn Wolfhard, Rachel House, and Werner Herzog. In 2026, it was announced that Edebiri would return to the stage playing Snoopy in an Encores! production of the musical You're a Good Man, Charlie Brown alongside David Hyde Pierce, Jin Ha and Danielle Brooks at New York City Center with performances starting in February 2027.

== Public image ==
In a Decider article published in June 2023, writer Raven Brunner said that Edebiri represented Gen Z humor in the mainstream, likening her brand of comedy to what Aubrey Plaza brought to the millennial generation. Edebiri denied being Gen Z in a 2025 interview, calling herself "technically a millennial".

== Personal life ==
Edebiri is a member of the Democratic Socialists of America (DSA) and has frequently canvassed for the organization. She is queer.

During a red carpet interview in 2023, she said in jest that she had played the role of "Jenny the Donkey" in the film The Banshees of Inisherin (2022) and in the process developed a deep connection with Ireland. The video quickly went viral amongst Irish social media users, who leaned into the joke by agreeing Edebiri was Irish. She reciprocated and began referring to Ireland as her home country in media interviews, thanking Ireland in award speeches, and generally playing into the idea of being Irish. This continued to increase her popularity in Ireland and led to her "adoption" as an "honorary Irishwoman".

In September 2025, Edebiri signed an open pledge with Film Workers for Palestine, pledging not to work with Israeli film institutions "that are implicated in genocide and apartheid against the Palestinian people."

== Acting credits ==
=== Film ===
Year	Title	Role	Notes	Ref.
2020	Cicada	Nikki		
2020	Shithouse	Emily	Uncredited role	
2021	How It Ends	Stand Up		
2021	As of Yet	Khadijah		
2022	Hello, Goodbye, and Everything in Between	Stella		
2023	Theater Camp	Janet Walch		
2023	Bottoms	Josie		
2023	The Sweet East	Molly		
2023	Spider-Man: Across the Spider-Verse	Glory Grant	Voice	
2023	Teenage Mutant Ninja Turtles: Mutant Mayhem	April O'Neil	Voice	
2024	Omni Loop	Paula Campos		
2024	Inside Out 2	Envy	Voice	
2025	Opus	Ariel Ecton	Also executive producer	
2025	After the Hunt	Margaret "Maggie" Resnick		
2025	Ella McCay	Susan		
2026	Lorne	Herself	Documentary	
2026	Clarissa	Young Sally		
2027	Ally †	TBA	Voice, in-production	

=== Television ===
Year	Title	Role	Notes	Ref.
2014	Defectives	Stacey	Episode: "Public Display of Affection"	
2020–2023	Bigtop Burger	Frances	Voice; recurring role	
2020–2025	Big Mouth	Missy Foreman-Greenwald	Voice; main role (season 4–8)	
2021	Dickinson	Hattie	Recurring role (season 2); also writer	
2021	The Premise	Eve Stone	Episode: "Social Justice Sex Tape"	
2022	Pause with Sam Jay	Party Guest	Episode: "Eyes Wide Butt"	
2022–2026	The Bear	Sydney Adamu	Main role; also director (episode: "Napkins")	
2023	Abbott Elementary	Ayesha Teagues	Recurring role	
2023	History of the World, Part II	Runaway Slave	Episode: "III"	
2023	Kiff	Professor Totsy	Voice; episode: "Kiff's Mix"	
2023	I Think You Should Leave with Tim Robinson	VR Shopping Spree Host	Episode: "I Can Do Whatever I Want."	
2023	Black Mirror	Sandy	Episode: "Joan Is Awful"	
2023	We Lost Our Human	Ham	Voice; interactive special	
2023–2024	Clone High	Harriet Tubman	Voice; main role	
2023–2024	Mulligan	General Scarpaccio/Jayson Moody	Voice; recurring role	
2024	Saturday Night Live	Herself (host)	Episode: "Ayo Edebiri/Jennifer Lopez"	
2024	Everybody Still Hates Chris	Ducky/Alice/Biker Gang Lady	Voice	
2024–2025	Tales of the Teenage Mutant Ninja Turtles	April O'Neil	Voice; main role	
2025	Everybody's Live with John Mulaney	Herself	Episode: "Are Dinosaurs Put Together Correctly?"	
2025	I Love LA	Mimi Rush	Episodes: "Roger & Munchy" & "Divas Down"	
2027	Prodigies	Didi	Main role	

=== Theater ===
Year	Title	Role	Playwright	Venue	Ref.
2026	Proof	Catherine	David Auburn	Booth Theatre, Broadway	
2027	You're a Good Man, Charlie Brown	Snoopy	Clark Gesner	New York City Center, Encores!	

=== Music videos ===
Year	Song	Artist	Role	Director	Ref.
2024	"Noid"	Tyler, the Creator	Fan	Tyler Okonma	
2025	"Terrapin"	Clairo	—N/a	Ayo Edebiri	
2025	"Darling, I"	Tyler, the Creator	—N/a	Tyler Okonma	

== Writing credits ==
Year	Title	Writer	Producer	Notes
2019	Sunnyside	Yes	No	Staff editor and wrote episode: "Too Many Lumpies"
2020–2022	Big Mouth	Yes	Yes	Consulting producer
2021	Dickinson	Yes	No	Staff writer and wrote 2 episodes
2022	What We Do in the Shadows	Yes	Yes	Consulting producer and wrote episode: "Private School"
2022	Craig of the Creek	Yes	No	Story writer of episode: "Adventures in Baby Casino"
2023	The Eric Andre Show	Yes	No	Creative consultant
2023	Mulligan	Yes	Yes	Episode: "The Egg Hunt"
2025	The Bear	Yes	No	Episode: "Worms"
TBA	Barney	Yes	No	Feature film

== Awards and nominations ==
Organizations	Year	Category	Work	Result	Ref.
Annie Awards	2025	Outstanding Achievement for Voice Acting in an Animated Series	Tales of the Teenage Mutant Ninja Turtles	Nominated	
Astra TV Awards	2024	Best Supporting Actress in a Streaming Series, Comedy	The Bear	Won (Note: Tied with Christina Ricci for Wednesday.)	
Astra TV Awards	2024	Best Writing in a Broadcast Network or Cable Series, Comedy	What We Do in the Shadows (for "Private School")	Won	
BAFTA Awards	2023	BAFTA Rising Star Award	—N/a	Nominated	
Black Reel Awards	2023	Outstanding Supporting Performance in a Comedy Series	The Bear	Nominated	
Black Reel Awards	2024	Outstanding Voice Performance	Teenage Mutant Ninja Turtles: Mutant Mayhem	Nominated	
Critics' Choice Awards	2022	Best Supporting Actress in a Comedy Series	The Bear (season one)	Nominated	
Critics' Choice Awards	2023	Best Actress in a Comedy Series	The Bear (season two)	Won	
Directors Guild of America Awards	2024	Outstanding Directing – Comedy Series	The Bear (for "Napkins")	Nominated	
Dorian Awards	2023	Best Supporting TV Performance — Comedy	The Bear	Won	
Dorian Awards	2024	Rising Star Award	—N/a	Won	
Drama League Awards	2026	Distinguished Performance	Proof	Nominated	
Golden Globe Awards	2023	Best Actress – Television Series Musical or Comedy	The Bear	Won	
Golden Globe Awards	2024	Best Actress – Television Series Musical or Comedy	The Bear	Nominated	
Golden Globe Awards	2026	Best Actress – Television Series Musical or Comedy	The Bear	Nominated	
Gotham Independent Film Awards	2022	Outstanding Performance in a New Series	The Bear	Nominated	
Independent Spirit Awards	2022	Best Supporting Performance in a New Scripted Series	The Bear	Won	
NAACP Image Awards	2023	Outstanding Writing in a Comedy Series	What We Do in the Shadows (for "Private School")	Nominated	
NAACP Image Awards	2023	Outstanding Supporting Actress in a Comedy Series	The Bear	Won	
NAACP Image Awards	2023	Outstanding Guest Performance in a Comedy or Drama Series	Abbott Elementary	Nominated	
Primetime Emmy Awards	2023	Outstanding Supporting Actress in a Comedy Series	The Bear (episode: "Review")	Won	
Primetime Emmy Awards	2024	Outstanding Lead Actress in a Comedy Series	The Bear (episode: "Sundae")	Nominated	
Primetime Emmy Awards	2025	Outstanding Lead Actress in a Comedy Series	The Bear (episode: "Legacy")	Nominated	
Primetime Emmy Awards	2025	Outstanding Directing for a Comedy Series	The Bear (episode: "Napkins")	Nominated	
Primetime Emmy Awards	2026	Outstanding Lead Actress in a Comedy Series	The Bear	Nominated	
Satellite Awards	2023	Best Actress – Television Series Musical or Comedy	The Bear	Nominated	
Screen Actors Guild Awards	2023	Outstanding Ensemble in a Comedy Series	The Bear	Nominated	
Screen Actors Guild Awards	2024	Outstanding Ensemble in a Comedy Series	The Bear	Won	
Screen Actors Guild Awards	2024	Outstanding Female Actor in a Comedy Series	The Bear	Won	
Screen Actors Guild Awards	2025	Outstanding Female Actor in a Comedy Series	The Bear	Nominated	
Screen Actors Guild Awards	2025	Outstanding Ensemble in a Comedy Series	The Bear	Nominated	
Television Critics Association Awards	2023	Individual Achievement in Comedy	The Bear	Nominated	
Television Critics Association Awards	2024	Individual Achievement in Comedy	The Bear	Nominated	
Writers Guild of America Awards	2023	Episodic Comedy	What We Do in the Shadows (for "Private School")	Nominated	
Writers Guild of America Awards	2026	Episodic Comedy	The Bear (with Lionel Boyce, for "Worms")	Nominated	

== See also ==
- List of black Golden Globe Award winners and nominees
- List of Primetime Emmy Award winners
