= William Scott =

William Scott may refer to:

== Academics ==
- William A. Scott (psychologist), American social psychologist
- William Alphonsus Scott (1871–1921), Irish Roman Catholic architectural historian
- William Amasa Scott (1862–1944), American economist
- William Anderson Scott (1813–1885), Presbyterian minister, author, and educator
- William Berryman Scott (1858–1947), American paleontologist
- William Earl Dodge Scott (1852–1910), American ornithologist
- William Henry Scott (historian) (1921–1993), anthropologist and historian
- William Henry Scott (university president) (1840–1937), American academic administrator
- William Richard Scott (born 1932), American sociologist
- W. R. Scott (economist) (William Robert Scott, 1868–1940), political economist

== Arts and entertainment ==
- Sir William Scott of Thirlestane (1645–1725), Scottish poet
- William Bell Scott (1811–1890), British poet and artist
- William Scott (artist) (1913–1989), British artist
- William Edouard Scott (1884–1964), African-American artist
- William Winfield Scott (1855–1935), American writer
- William Matthew Scott (1893–1964), pen name Will Scott, English author
- William Scott (actor) (1893–1967), American silent film actor
- Bill Scott (voice actor) (William Scott, 1920–1985), American voice actor and producer
- William Lee Scott (born 1973), American actor
- William Rufus Scott, employer of Margaret Wise Brown, publisher of W. R. Scott (publisher)
- William B. Scott (magazine editor), American magazine editor
- Bill Scott (author) (William Neville Scott, 1923–2005), Australian author and folklorist
- Billy "Uke" Scott (William Scott, 1923–2004), British music hall star

== Law ==
- Sir William Scott (justice) (died 1350s), English lawyer and chief justice of the King's Bench
- Sir William Scott, Lord Balwearie (died 1532), Scottish judge
- William Scott (Irish lawyer) (1705–1776)
- William Scott, 1st Baron Stowell (1745–1836), English judge and jurist
- William Scott (Missouri judge) (1804–1862), judge on the Missouri Supreme Court
- Will T. Scott (born 1947), judge on the Kentucky Supreme Court

== Politics ==
=== Canada ===
- William Henry Scott (politician) (1799–1851), Canadian politician
- William James Scott (1812–1882), farmer and politician in Canada West
- William Hepburn Scott (1837–1881), Canadian lawyer and politician from Ontario
- William C. Scott (1921–1998), Canadian politician

=== United Kingdom ===
- William Scott (died 1434), MP for Kent
- Sir William Scott (Lord Warden) (1459–1524), English politician, Lord Warden of the Cinque Ports
- William Scott (MP for New Woodstock) (c. 1579–aft. 1611), MP for New Woodstock
- Sir William Scott, Lord Clerkington (died 1656), Scottish politician and judge
- Sir William Scott, 6th Baronet (1803–1871), Scottish Liberal politician
- William Montagu Douglas Scott, 6th Duke of Buccleuch (1831–1914), Scottish member of parliament and peer

=== United States ===
- William Grason Scott (died 1882), American politician
- William Lawrence Scott (1828–1891), US representative from Pennsylvania and mayor of Erie, Pennsylvania
- W. Kerr Scott (1896–1958), American politician, governor of North Carolina, US senator
- William L. Scott (1915–1997), US senator and representative from Virginia
- William J. Scott (Illinois politician) (1926–1986), American politician
- William R. Scott, candidate in the 1980 United States Senate election in New York
- William Scott (Kentucky politician), Kentucky legislator
- W. R. Scott (politician) (1868–?), American politician, member of the Mississippi State Senate
- William Thomas Scott (1839–1917), business and political leader in Cairo, Illinois

=== Other countries ===
- William Scott (South Australian politician) (1795–1866), vigneron, businessman and politician in South Australia
- Jack Scott (New Zealand politician) (William John Scott, 1915–2001)
- Alex Scott (politician) (William Alexander Scott, born 1940), Bermudian politician, premier of Bermuda

== Religion ==
- Maurus Scott (William Scott, died 1612), English Roman Catholic priest, missionary, and martyr
- William Scott (Anglican priest, born 1813) (1813–1872), English clergyman
- William Scott (astronomer and priest) (1825–1917), Church of England clergyman; colonial astronomer for New South Wales
- William Scott (archdeacon of Bombay) (died 1918), British priest
- Bill Scott (priest) (William Sievwright Scott, 1946–2020), British Anglican priest
- Gene Scott (William Eugene Scott, 1929–2005), American pastor and television evangelist

== Sports ==
- William Scott (jockey) (1797–1848), British jockey
- William Martin Scott (1870–1944), English international rugby union half back
- William Patrick Scott (1880–1948), Scottish international rugby union player
- Will Scott (1893–1972), English footballer and football manager
- William Scott (Australian cricketer) (1882–1965)
- William Scott (cricketer, born 1845) (1845–1899), English cricketer
- William Scott (English cricketer, born 1864) (1864–1920)
- William Scott (English cricketer, born 1903) (1903–1989)
- William Scott (Scottish cricketer) (1908–1971)
- William Scott (runner) (1886–?), English long-distance runner who competed at the 1912 Summer Olympics
- William Scott (runner, born 1921), American middle-distance runner, 1942 All-American for the Michigan State Spartans track and field team
- Bill Scott (American football) (William James Scott, born 1952)
- Bill Scott (Irish footballer) (William John Scott, fl. 1930s)
- Bill Scott (bowls) (William Garry Scott, 1910–?), Scottish lawn bowler
- Bill Scott (footballer, born 1880) (William Francis Scott, 1880–1969), Australian rules footballer
- Bill Scott (footballer, born 1890) (William Edgar Scott, 1890–1968), Australian rules footballer
- Bill Scott (ice hockey) (William G. Scott Jr., born c. 1980), Canadian ice hockey executive
- Bill Scott (rugby league) (William Arthur Scott, 1896–?), New Zealand rugby league player
- Bill Scott (runner) (William Scott, born 1952), Australian long-distance runner
- Billy Scott (footballer, born 1882) (William Edward Scott, 1882–1936), Irish footballer
- Billy Scott (footballer, born 1907) (William Reed Scott, 1907–1969), English footballer

== Other ==
- William A. Scott, pilot of the Boeing 727 in the unsolved DB Cooper case of commercial air piracy
- William Henry Scott (British Army officer) (1789–1868), British Army general
- William Scott (The Sleeping Sentinel) (1839–1862/40–1862), Union Army soldier during the American Civil War
- William R. Scott, chief of staff of the 1st Infantry Division in 1919
- William Scott Shipbuilders, British shipyard based in Bristol during the mid-18th century
- William Gillbee Scott (1857–1930), English architect who designed the Gower Street Memorial Chapel (now the Chinese Church in London)
- William Bennett Scott Sr., American newspaper founder and publisher, mayor, and civil rights campaigner

== See also ==
- Willie Scott (disambiguation)
- Bill Scott (disambiguation)
- William Scot, medieval bishop elect
