= Bill Scott =

Bill Scott or Billy Scott may refer to:

== Arts and entertainment ==
- Bill Scott (voice actor) (1920–1985), American voice actor and animation writer
- Billy "Uke" Scott (1923–2004), British music hall performer and ukulele player
- Bill Scott (author) (1923–2005), Australian author, songwriter, poet and collector of Australian folk history
- Billy Scott (singer) (1942–2012), American R&B musician
- Bill Scott (artist) (born 1956), Contemporary American painter

== Sports ==
=== Association football (soccer) ===
- Billy Scott (footballer, born 1882) (1882–1936), Irish footballer
- Billy Scott (footballer, born 1907) (1907–1969), English footballer
- Bill Scott (Irish footballer) (fl. 1920s–1930s), Irish footballer

=== Australian rules football ===
- Bill Scott (footballer, born 1880) (1880–1969), Australian rules footballer for South Melbourne
- Bill H. Scott (1886–1960), Australian rules footballer for Richmond
- Bill Scott (footballer, born 1890) (1890–1968), Australian rules footballer for Fitzroy and Essendon

=== Auto racing ===
- Billy Scott (racing driver) (1948–2017), American race car driver
- Bill Scott (racing driver) (fl. 1959), American race car driver in 1959 Western North Carolina 500
- Billy Scott (crew chief) (born 1977), American race car driver

=== Other sports ===
- William Patrick Scott (Bill Scott, 1880–1948), Scottish rugby player
- Bill Scott (rugby league) (1896–?), New Zealand rugby league footballer
- Bill Scott (American football) (born 1944), American football player
- Bill Scott (basketball) (fl. 1951–1962), American college basketball coach and athletics administrator
- Bill Scott (runner) (born 1952), Australian long-distance runner, 1980 Summer Olympics
- Bill Scott (bowls) (fl. 1970–1974), Scottish lawn bowler
- Bill Scott (ice hockey) (born 1980), Canadian ice hockey executive
- Billy Scott (rugby league) (born 2004), Australian rugby league footballer
- Billy-Scott Irakose (born 1996), Burundian swimmer

== Other ==
- Bill Scott (priest) (1946–2020), British Anglican priest, former Domestic Chaplain to the Queen

== See also ==
- William Scott (disambiguation)
- Willie Scott (disambiguation)
