= Roswell Weidner =

American artist

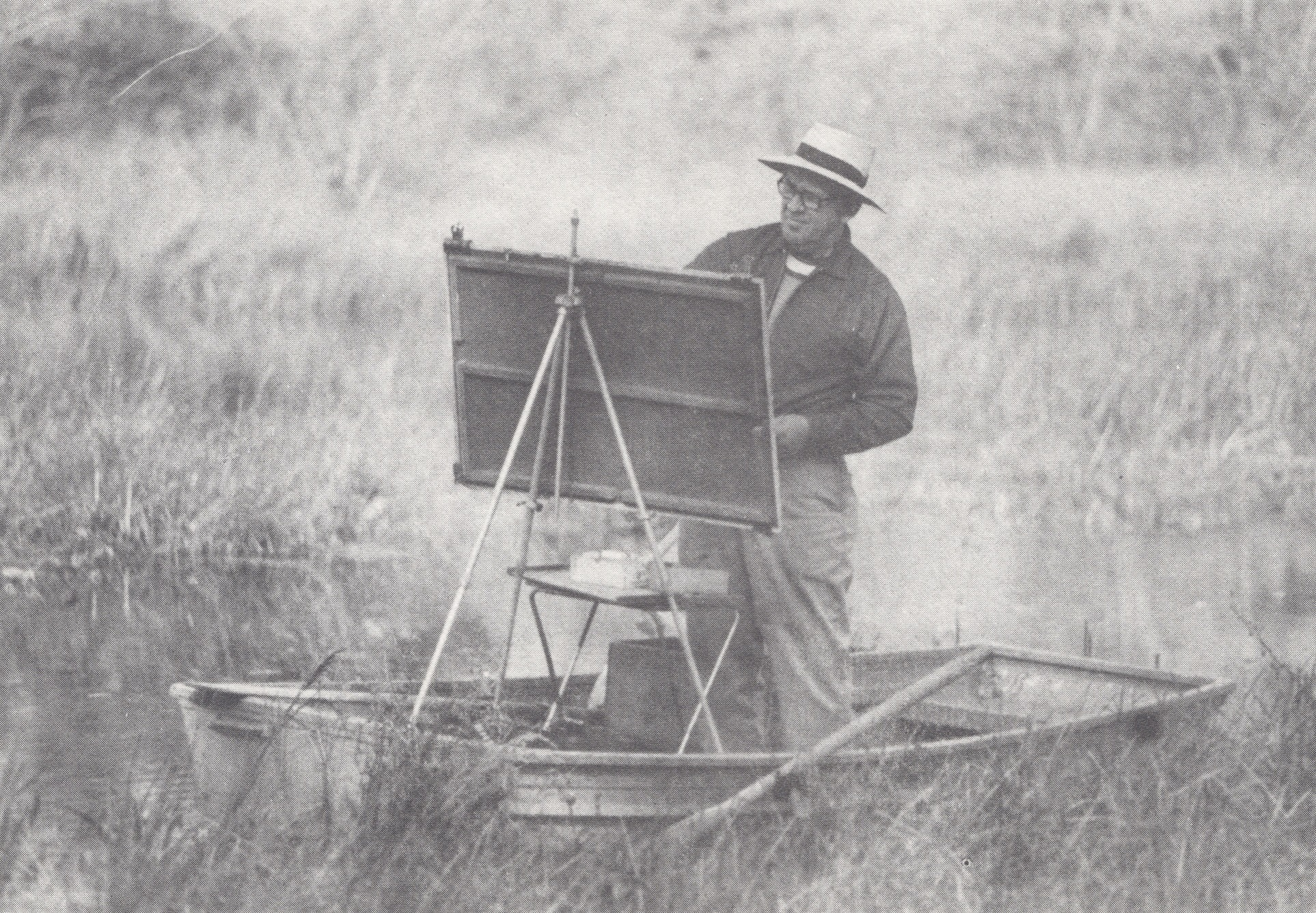
- Born: Roswell Theodore Weidner; September 18, 1911; Reading, Pennsylvania, U.S.
- Died: September 22, 1999 (aged 88); Philadelphia, Pennsylvania, U.S.
- Resting place: New Jersey Pine Barrens
- Spouse(s): Doris Kunzie Weidner (m. 1938-1956), American artist; Marilyn Kemp Weidner (m. 1957-1999), Conservator of Art on Paper

Roswell Weidner (September 18, 1911 – September 22, 1999) was an American artist known for his paintings, charcoal and pastel drawings, and prints. His subject matter included still life, landscapes, and portraits. He was a student at the Pennsylvania Academy of the Fine Arts (PAFA) city school and country school in Chester Springs, and the Barnes Foundation.

Weidner worked in the Works Progress Administration Arts Project during the Great Depression and in a shipyard as an expediter during World War II. Weidner began teaching at the Pennsylvania Academy of the Fine Arts in 1938. He was associated with the academy for 66 years, first as a student and later as a teacher, until his retirement in 1996.

== Early life and education ==
External audio
- Oral history interview with Weidner (4+ hours, 134 page transcript available upon request), July 20–27, 1989, Smithsonian Archives of American Art

Roswell Weidner was born in Reading, Pennsylvania on September 18, 1911. His father, Harry, was an iron puddler who lost his job and the family savings in the Great Depression. Harry Weidner worked on road crews as part of WPA and made bootleg liquor. Weidner's mother, Almeda Hughes, who only had a fourth grade education, taught him his multiplication tables before he went to school. Weidner's youth included hunting and fishing with his father, which provided still life subjects for his early artwork. He was a member of the Reading Senior High School art club which took frequent trips to nearby art shows. The instructor for the art club was Italo L. De Francesco who later became the Art Director, then President of Kutztown University of Pennsylvania from 1959-1967. De Francesco was instrumental in Weidner's admission to the Reading Museum drawing classes while he was still in high school.

In 1930, Weidner received a scholarship from Reading Senior High School in Reading, Pennsylvania to attend the country school of the Pennsylvania Academy of the Fine Arts (PAFA) in Chester Springs. Weidner got odd jobs at the school including working for the English gardener mowing lawns, weeding, cleaning out the swimming pool, and doing dishes. This gave Weidner opportunities to work outside and enjoy nature and the outdoors. Weidner was known for his energy and strength which was needed to maintain the gardens on this large property. He attended the country school until 1934 when PAFA closed it as a year-round school. Weidner was awarded the Cresson Traveling Scholarship in 1935. He completed his studies at PAFA's city school in Philadelphia in 1936. He also studied at the Barnes Foundation in Merion, PA, from 1934-1936. Weidner met Doris (Dorcas) Kunzie at Chester Springs Art School whom he married in 1938.

== Career ==
=== Works Progress Administration ===
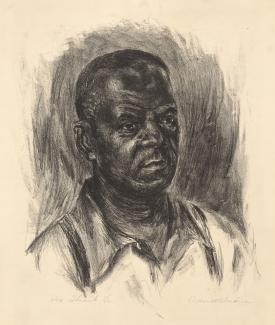
1938-Portrait of Dox Thrash by Weidner

In 1936, the Works Progress Administration (WPA) accepted Weidner for its National Youth Administration program. For the NYA, Weidner worked at the Pennsylvania Academy of the Fine Arts in the library cataloging books. In the 1989 Smithsonian Archives of American Art interview, Weidner pointed out that the PAFA library at the time didn't have art books but rather first editions "like Uncle Tom's Cabin". Art students at the time didn't have access to color reproductions and there were very few modern art books.

Weidner turned 25 in September 1936 and aged out of the NYA. At that point he was moved to the WPA Art Project. In a 1986 interview with David R. Brigham, Weidner said that he created drawings in the margins of the booklets that the children could color in. He was later assigned to the Museum Project in West Philadelphia and created animals for dioramas for museums. He requested a transfer to the Painting Section where he had to create one oil painting per month. The paintings were given to Federal Buildings including schools. Much of this art has been lost. Finally, he worked in the WPA Graphics Arts Workshop (Print Section) in Philadelphia with Dox Thrash, Michael J. Gallagher and Hugh Mesibov. Weidner created a Portrait of Dox Thrash (lithograph) while they worked together. Prints of most of the 21 etchings, lithographs or carborundum prints created by Roswell Weidner while on WPA are in the Philadelphia Free Library print collection.

=== Artist and teacher ===
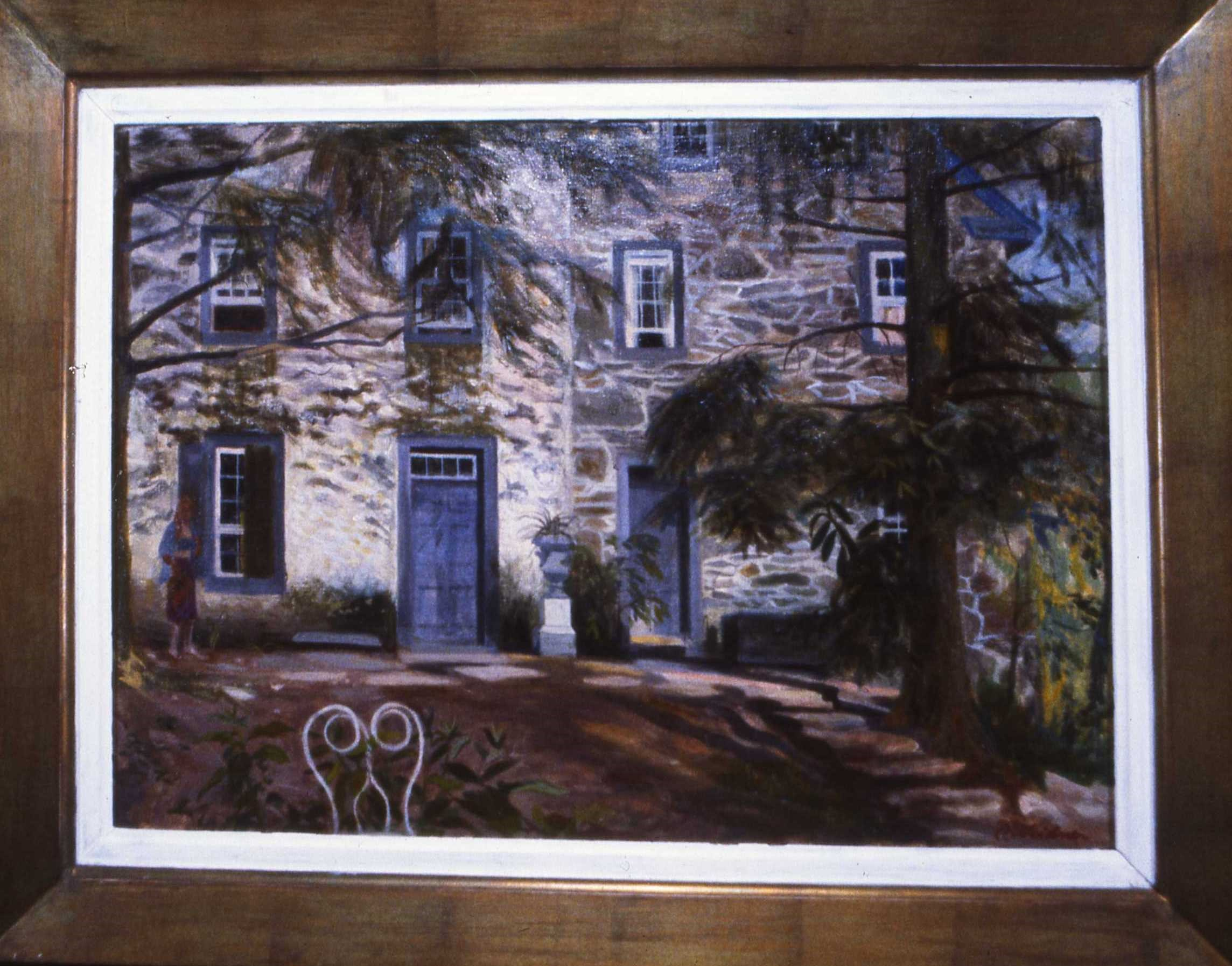
1947-The Stone House by Weidner

In 1938, Weidner was offered and accepted a teaching position at the Pennsylvania Academy of the Fine Arts. He left the WPA at this time and was not part of WPA when it was liquidated in 1943. His early successes in art exhibitions at the Carnegie International in Pittsburgh, Corcoran Biennial in Washington, D.C., and PAFA Annual Exhibitions in Philadelphia resulted in his inclusion in the 1939 New York World’s Fair representing Pennsylvania.

Weidner's teaching and art were interrupted in 1941 with the advent of World War II. He was laid off from PAFA and took night courses to be able to read blueprints. He was hired by the John H. Mathis & Company Shipyard in Camden, New Jersey, as an expeditor, marine pipefitter, layout man, and marine draftsman. During this time Weidner got special permission to paint pictures of men working on the docks at the shipyard. One of these paintings is in the collection of the Independence Seaport Museum. In 1944, as the war was ending, another construction company offered Weidner a job in South America but at the same time he received an offer to return to teaching at PAFA. He decided to take the teaching position.

Also in 1944, Roswell and Doris Weidner bought a farm outside Philadelphia in Christiana, Pennsylvania with the money he saved while working at the shipyard. Weidner returned to teaching painting, drawing and lithography at PAFA and the Philadelphia College of Art. The farm and surrounding area including the Mercer's Mill Covered Bridge were frequent subjects of Weidner's art in the 1940s and 1950s. In 2001 the farm was the subject of a novel by Jack Lindeman, "Appleseed Hollow", in which he describes life on the farm in the late 1950s.

During his career as an instructor at PAFA, Weidner taught various art media (graphics arts, lithography, painting, and drawing) and levels of students but he was also involved with decisions regarding the school. As a faculty member he worked with the administration on a number of issues most notably the use of the Belgravia Hotel (which was later named the Peale House) as studios for advanced students and faculty. Weidner took over management of the PAFA evening school and boosted attendance from 28 to over 200 per semester in the late 1950s and early 1960s. Weidner also served as president of the Pennsylvania Academy of Fine Arts Fellowship (alumni association) from 1955-1967.

== Growth of artistic style ==
External audio
- Oral history interview with Estelle Gross, April 5, 1989, Smithsonian Archives of American Art

Until the mid-1950s, Weidner was content to paint in the style of his early teachers at the Academy that included Henry McCarter, George Matthews Harding, Daniel Garber, Francis Wayland Speight, and Joseph Pearson Jr. He described himself as a Jack-of-all Trades since he was proficient in landscape, portrait, figure and still life painting. Influences of post-impressionist painting at the Barnes Foundation and of Japanese art permeated his work. Despite the popularity of subsequent trends, such as the use of color in ‘Op Art”, the hard edges of ‘Pop Art’ and the simplicity of ‘minimalism', Weidner continued to paint nature in a realistic style. His work became more ambitious in scale and incorporated the Oriental concept of space while retaining Western form of modeling, light and perspective. He also returned to drawing – large, powerful but delicately executed charcoals.

In the 1960s and early 1970s, Weidner's landscapes mostly focused on Smithville, Burlington County, New Jersey; Cheyney, Pennsylvania; and the area around Danville, Vermont, and the coast of Maine particularly near Bristol, Maine. In 1956, Weidner and his first wife divorced, and Weidner lost the Christiana farm which had been a source of inspiration for his landscapes. In 1957, he married Marilyn Kemp. During this time, the growing Weidner family would spend entire summers at locations so that he could paint. Weidner also drove his emerald green Ford van to Maine to paint views of oceans waves crashing against the shore.

In 1974, Weidner discovered the New Jersey Pine Barrens. At his campsite, deep in the Wharton State Forest, he found solitude where he could work undisturbed from morning until dusk, following the changing colors and light of the seasons. He called it his “Paradise”. In an article in American Artist in 1980, Bill Scott (artist) describes Weidner's style in this way:

"In his landscapes, Weidner takes a greater liberty in changing and rearranging the colors and shapes he sees than in his figure paintings. The dominant element in his work continues to be the intensity and vibrancy of his colors - strong violets, blues and greens. While his earlier work was "fluid"-looking, his paintings now have the dry surface and brilliant color of pastel."

The Philadelphia Inquirer Art Critic from 1962 to 2012 was Victoria Donohoe, who wrote the following about Weidner's 1981 show at the Marian Locks Gallery in Philadelphia:

"Weidner's talent was nurtured on Renoir and apparently on Monet's paintings of his famed garden at Giverny. Weidner hasn't attained the extraordinary refinement of their observation of momentary effects of light and color, but there's a robust directness in Weidner's work and fidelity of record as he zeroes in on the ground plane without looking skyward at all. To a larger extent than before, the quality of the artist's own reactions is now felt, as he goes about finding his inspiration in the outer aspects of nature. Weidner takes the colors of nature and heightens them considerably. He has shown increasing curiosity about color. Now he sometimes gets combinations to work that shouldn't. In this show, particularly in the pastels with the softer, quieter range of hues, Roswell Weidner can be appreciated as the fine landscapist he is. It's through a display such as this that artists may hope to regain appreciation of the fact that a natural source of art's interest, and one of its major functions, is to give expression to one's own locality and to living life naturally."

== Selected exhibitions ==
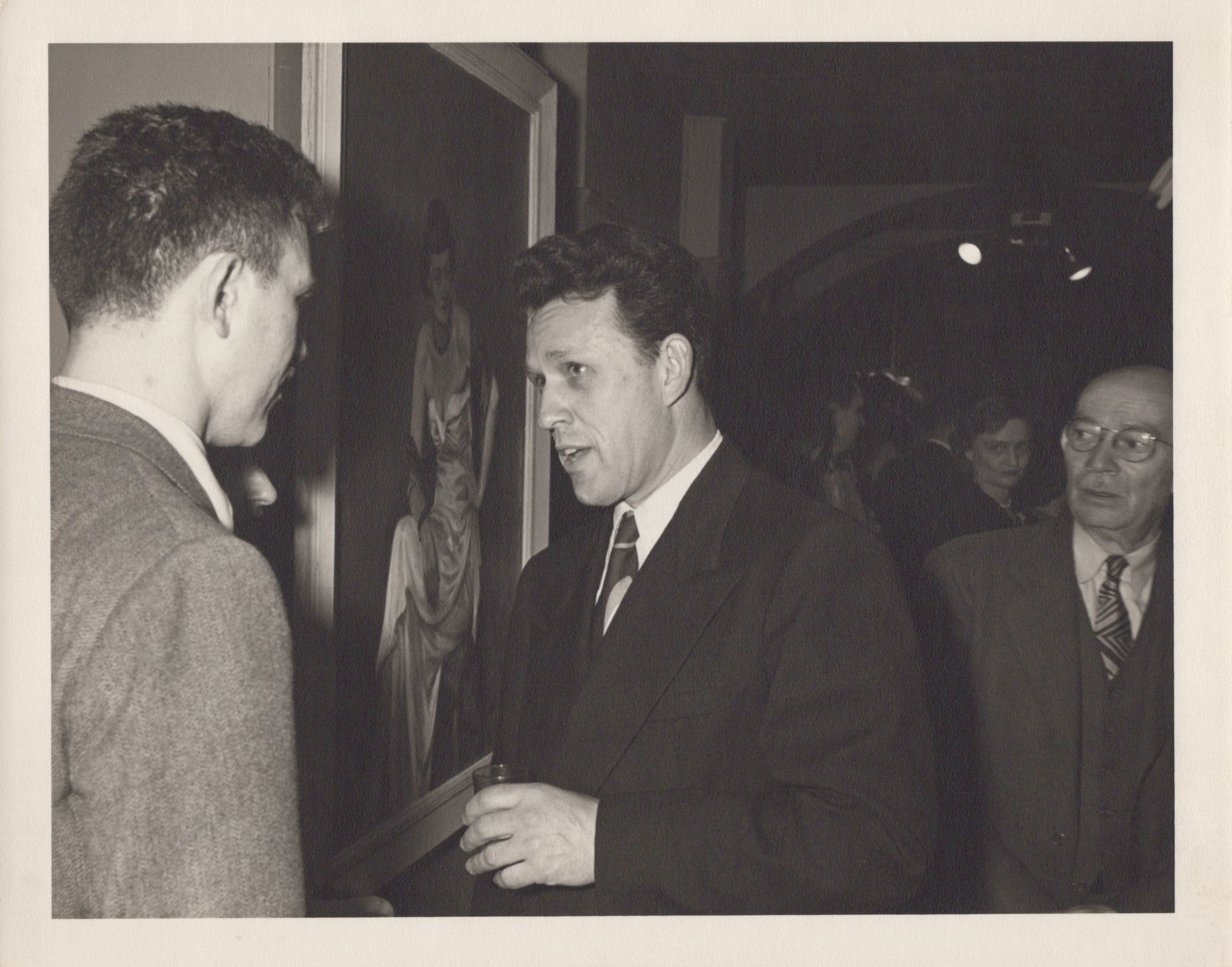
Weidner at the Beryl Lush Exhibition in 1953

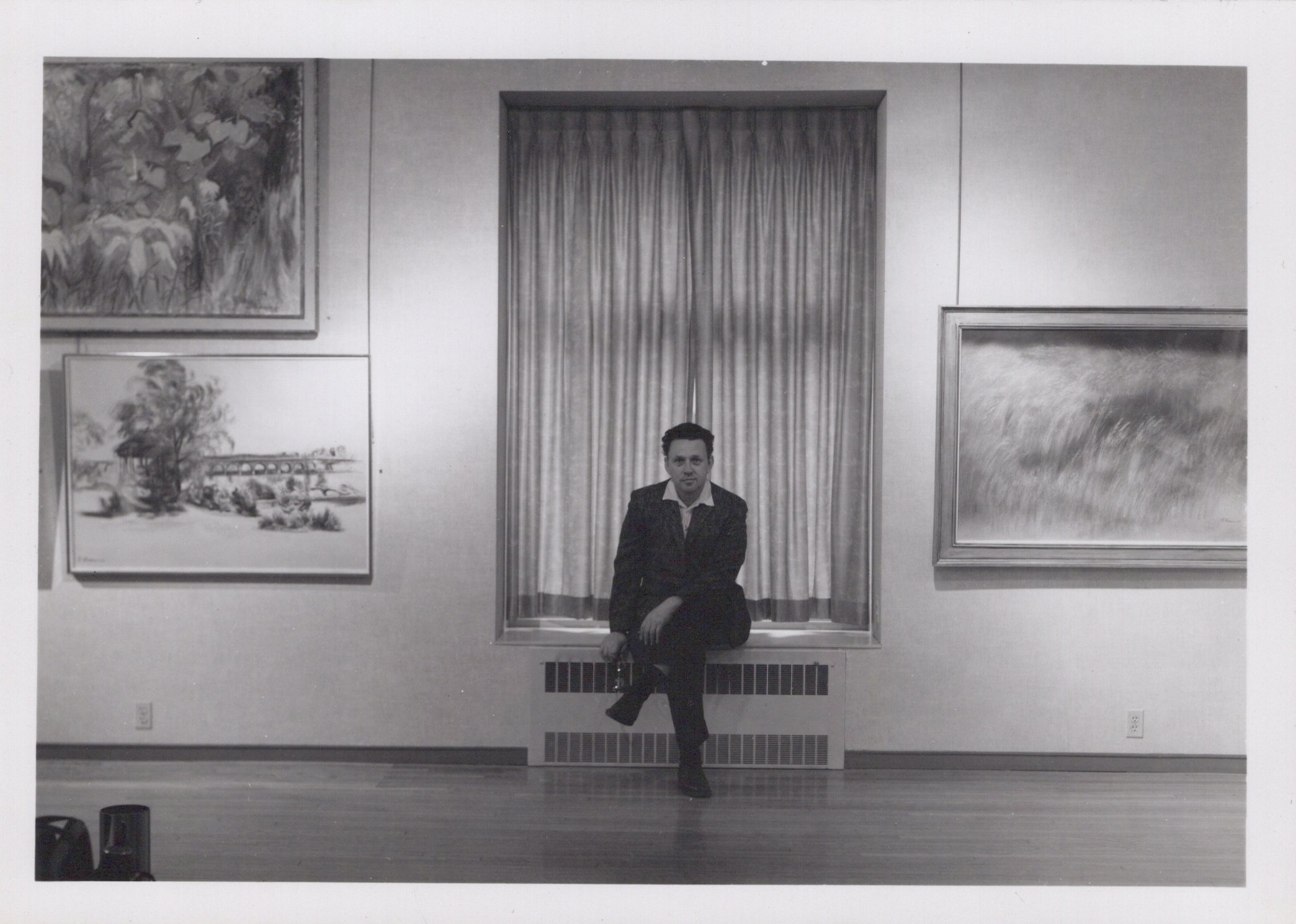
Weidner at the Peale House Exhibition in 1965

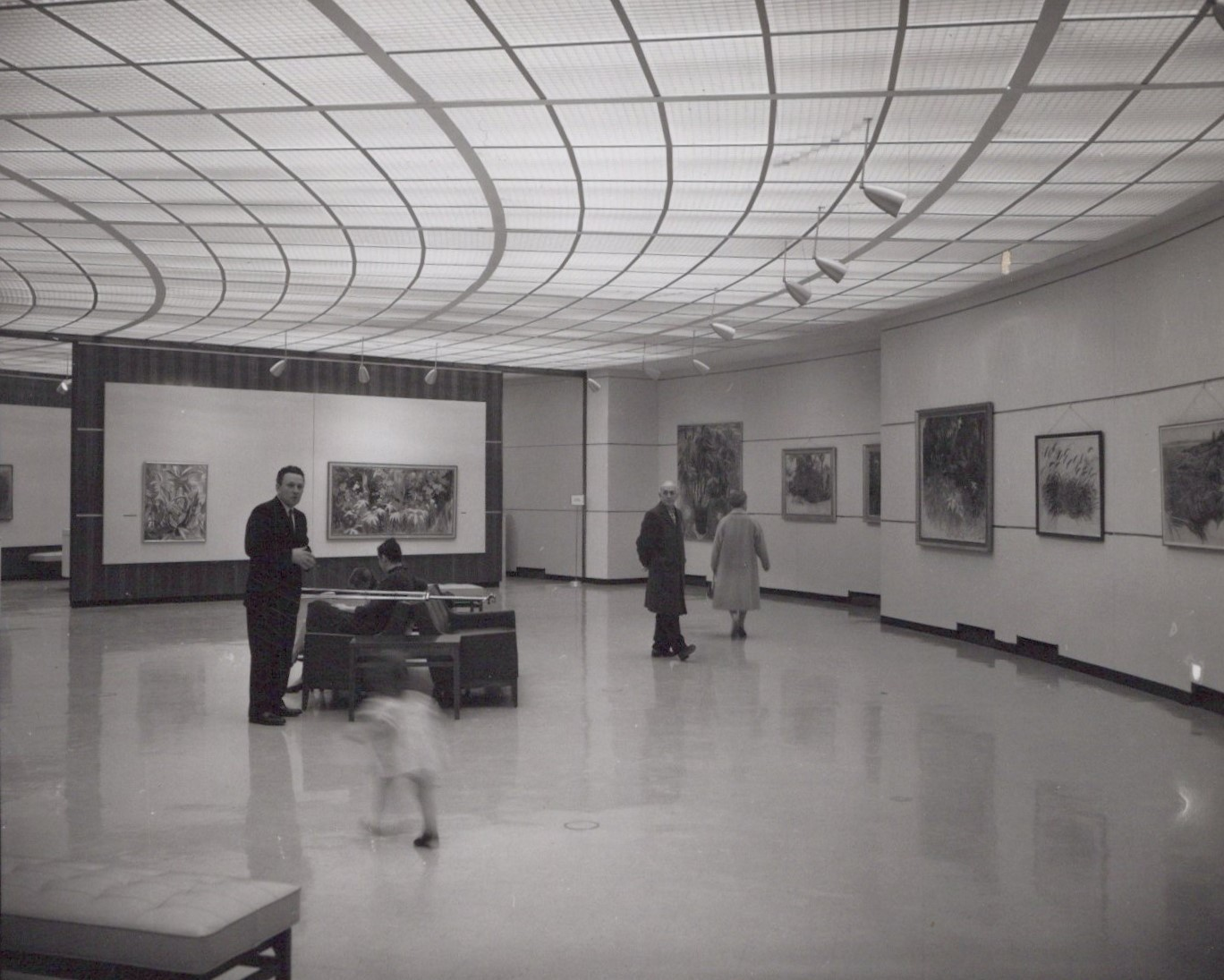
Paintings and Drawings by Roswell Weidner at the William Penn Memorial Museum in 1966

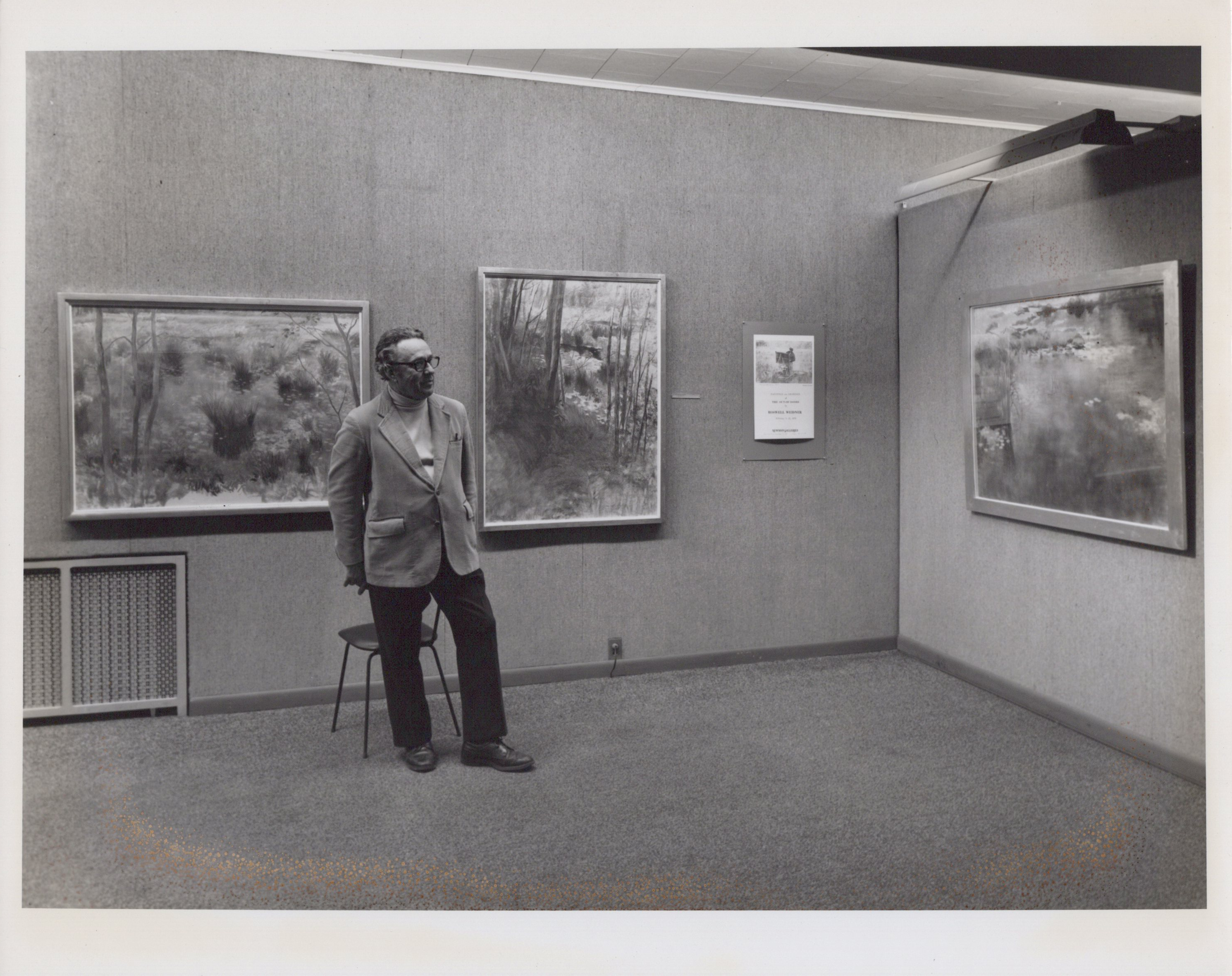
Weidner's The Out-of-Doors at Newman Galleries 1978

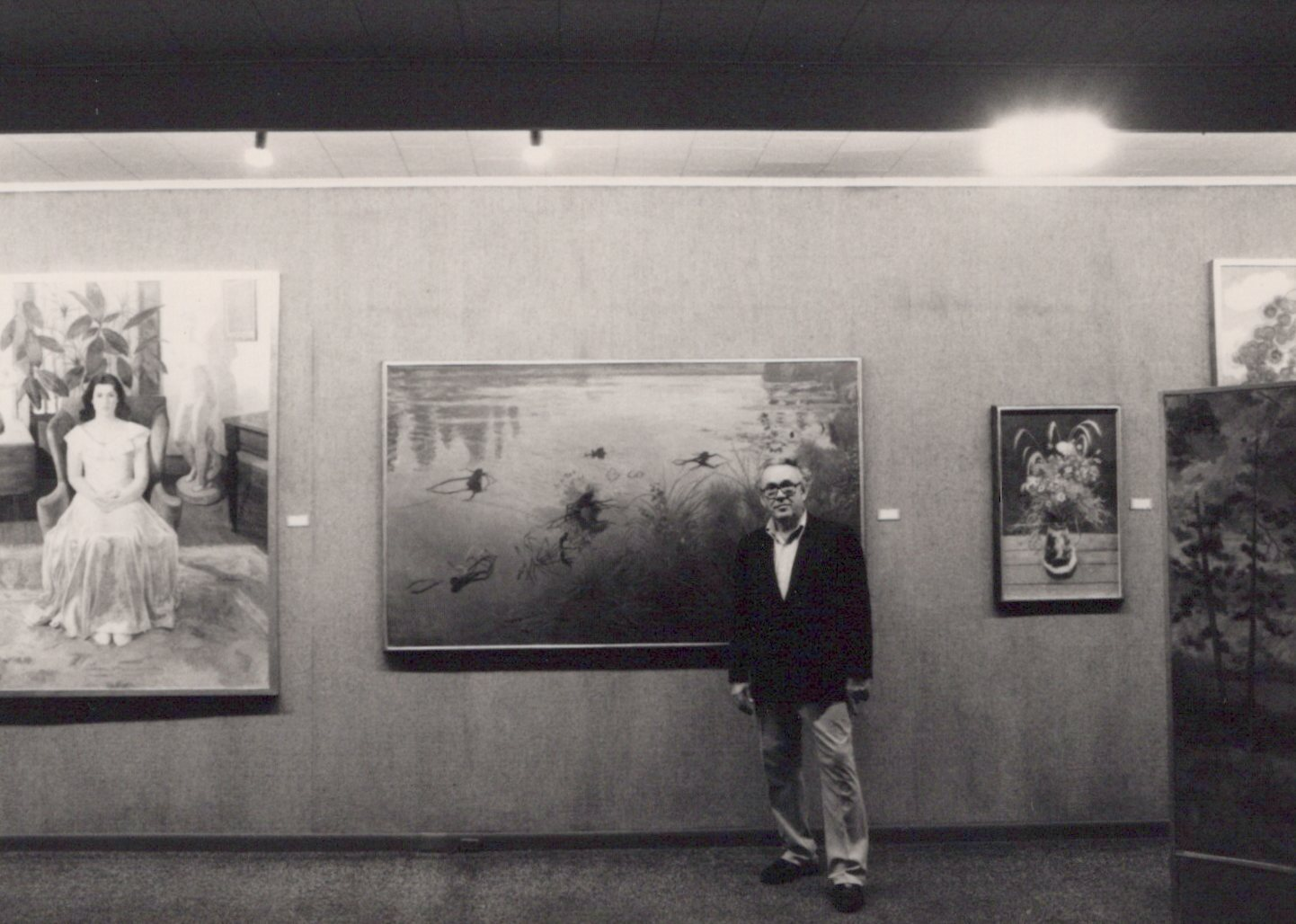
Weidner's Paintings and Pastels of the '80's at the Newman Galleries in 1987

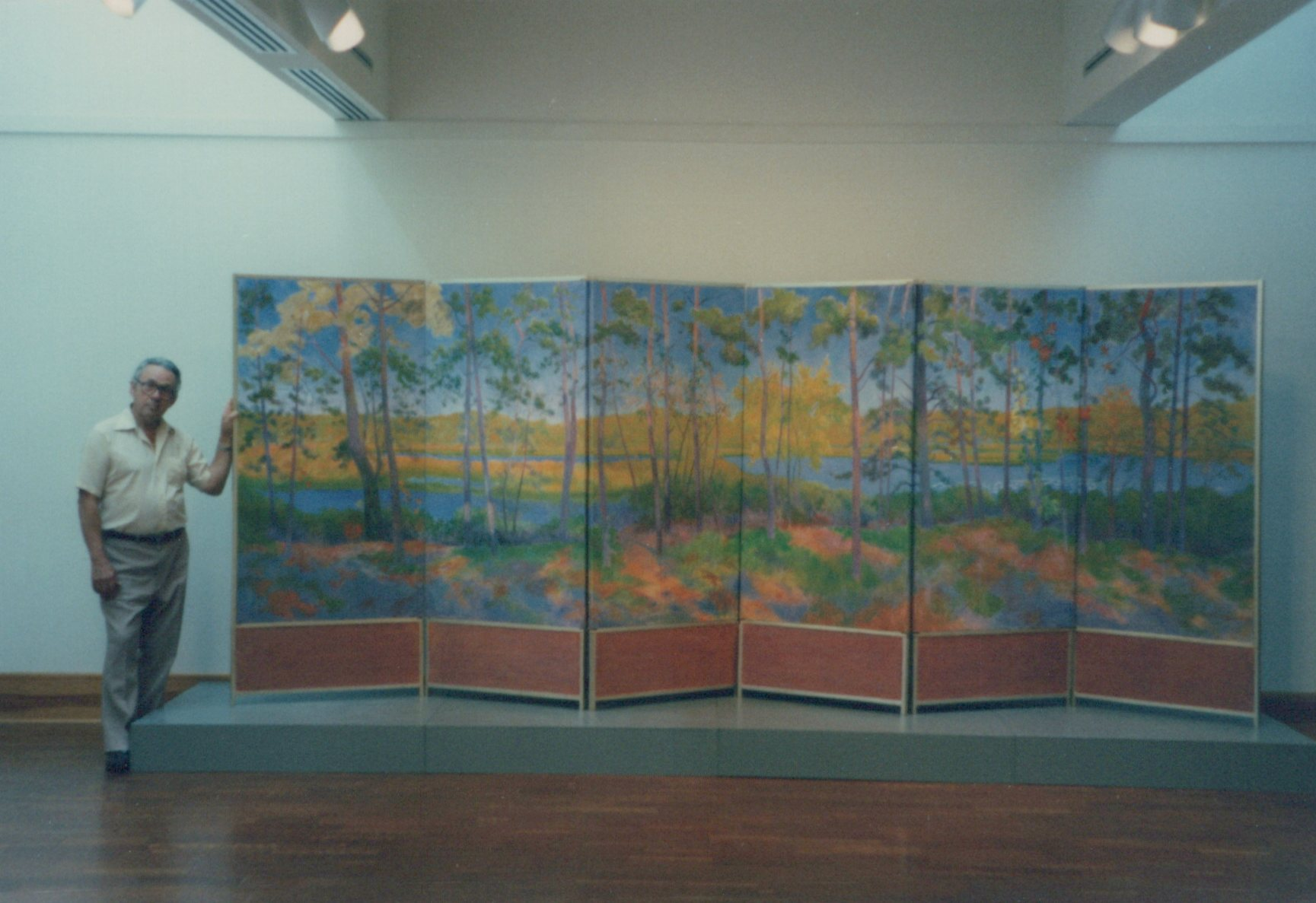
Roswell Weidner "Landscapes Here and Now" (group show) at the Noyes Museum in 1987

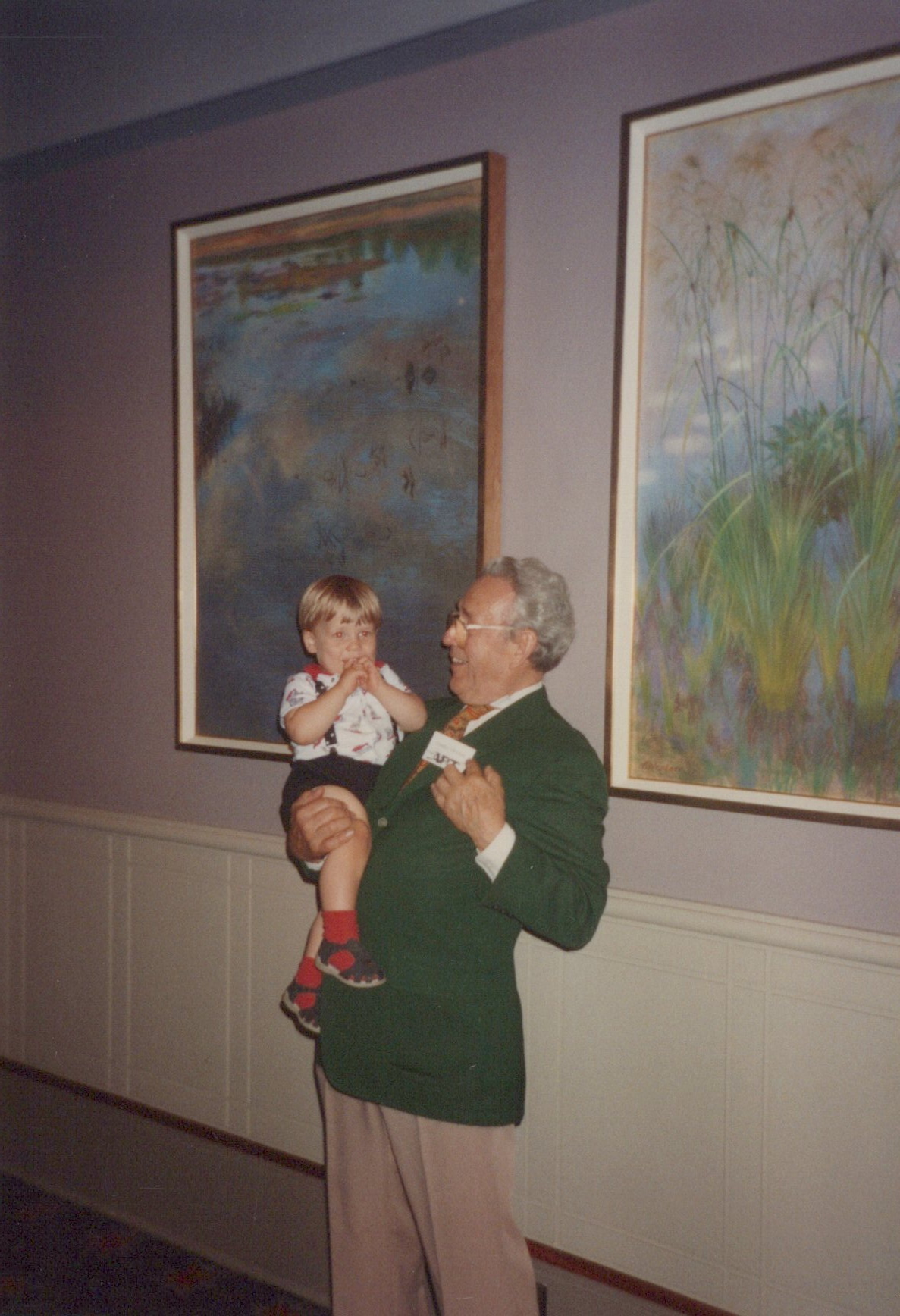
Weidner at the opening of the Pennsylvania Convention Center in 1993

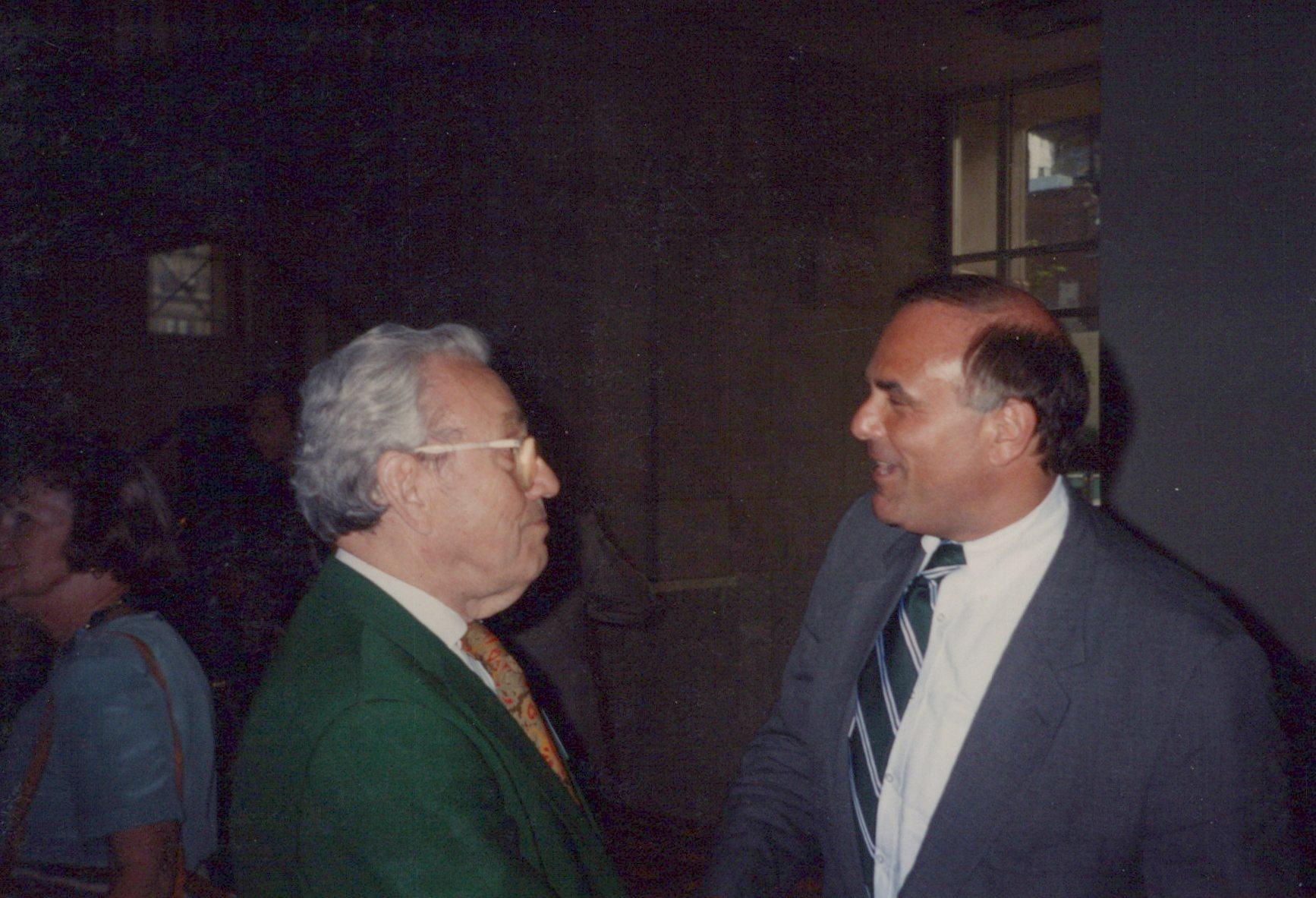
Weidner and Ed Rendell at the opening of the Pennsylvania Convention Center in 1993

- WPA Exhibitions, 1938-1942
- Corcoran Gallery of Art Sixteenth Biennial in Washington, D.C., 1939
- "American Art: Graphic Arts", 1939 New York World's Fair, New York City, New York
- "Directions in American Painting" Carnegie Museum of Art, Pittsburgh, PA, 1941
- "Artists for Victory: An Exhibition of Contemporary American Art : Paintings, Sculpture, prints" sponsored by Artists for Victory, Inc. The Metropolitan Museum of Art, New York, New York, 1942
- National Academy of Design 116th Annual Exhibition of contemporary American painting and sculpture, New York City, New York, 1942
- The Biennial at the Corcoran Gallery of Art, Washington, D.C., 1943
- National Academy of Design 120th Annual Exhibition of contemporary American painting and sculpture, New York City, New York, 1946
- "Roswell Weidner", Philadelphia Artist's Gallery, Pennsylvania Academy of the Fine Arts, Philadelphia, PA, 1948
- "Paintings by Roswell Weidner" at the Beryl Lush Gallery, Philadelphia, PA, 1953
- "The Peale House Galleries of the Pennsylvania Academy of the Fine Arts present and Exhibition of Paintings and Drawings by Roswell Weidner", Philadelphia, PA, 1966
- "Paintings and Drawings by Roswell Weidner" at the William Penn Memorial Museum (aka, State Museum of Pennsylvania), Harrisburg, Pennsylvania. Sponsored by the Pennsylvania Historical and Museum Commission, 1966
- "Roswell Weidner Paintings & Drawings Exhibition Selected from 1938 to the present" at the McCleaf Gallery, Philadelphia, PA, 1970
- "The New Deal and the Artist: An Exhibition of the 40th Anniversary of the Founding of WPA", Historical Society of Pennsylvania, Philadelphia, PA 1975
- "Paintings and Drawings of the Out-of-Doors by Roswell Weidner" Newman Galleries, Philadelphia, PA, February 1978
- "Summer of 1978" New Paintings and Pastels by Roswell Weidner, Woodmere Art Gallery (aka, Woodmere Art Museum), Philadelphia, PA, Nov-Dec 1978
- "Southern New Jersey Landscape" Long Beach Island, Foundation of The Arts and Sciences, July 1980
- "The Pine Barrens by Roswell Weidner" Marian Locks Gallery, Philadelphia, PA, May 1981
- "Roswell Weidner" Peale House Galleries of the Pennsylvania Academy of the Fine Arts, Philadelphia, PA, 1985
- "Roswell Weidner Paintings & Pastels of the '80's" Newman Galleries, Philadelphia, PA, April 1987
- "WPA - A Philadelphia Retrospective", Philadelphia, PA 1988
- "Living Treasures" University City Science Center, Philadelphia, PA, February 1998
- "Arts at Crozer" Crozer-Chester Medical Center, Upland, Pennsylvania, November 1990 to January 1991
- "A Tribute to Roswell Weidner" Museum of the Pennsylvania Academy of the Fine Arts, Philadelphia, PA, August 2001
- "Ode to the Jersey Pine Barrens" The Noyes Museum of Art, Loveladies, New Jersey, July 2002
- "A retrospective of the work of Roswell Weidner, 1911-1999" at The Gallery at Bristol-Myers Squibb, Lawrence Township, New Jersey, 2004

== Selected collections ==
- Chester County History Center
- Franklin D. Roosevelt Presidential Library and Museum Artifact Collection, National Archives
- Free Library of Philadelphia WPA Collection
- Frick Art Reference Library
- Library of Congress
- Pennsylvania Academy of the Fine Arts (PAFA)
- Pennsylvania Convention Center
- Picker Art Gallery, Dr. Luther W. Brady Collection, Colgate University
- Philadelphia Museum of Art
- Reading Public Museum
- Smithsonian American Art Museum
- The Metropolitan Museum of Art
- University of Pennsylvania
- U.S. General Services Administration (GSA)
- WPA Artwork in Non-federal Repositories

== Recognition ==
- 1935 Pennsylvania Academy of the Fine Art (PAFA) 140th Annual, Cresson Traveling Scholarship
- 1936 PAFA 141st Annual, Toppan Drawing Prize
- 1943 PAFA Fellowship Prize
- 1965 PAFA 160th Annual, Philadelphia Watercolor Club Dawson Memorial Award
- 1972 Philadelphia Watercolor Club Dawson Memorial Award
- 1975 Philadelphia Watercolor Club Dawson Memorial Award
- 1975 PAFA Fellowship at the Woodmere Gallery The Percy Owens Award for a Distinguished Pennsylvania Artist
- 1977 PAFA Fellowship The Thornton Oakley Memorial Prize
- 1985 Who Was Who in America 1985-present
- 1996 PAFA Dean's Award for Distinguished Service to the School
- 1998 "A Philadelphia Treasure" Liberty Bell Award, presented by Mayor Edward G. Rendell, City of Philadelphia, PA

== Gallery ==
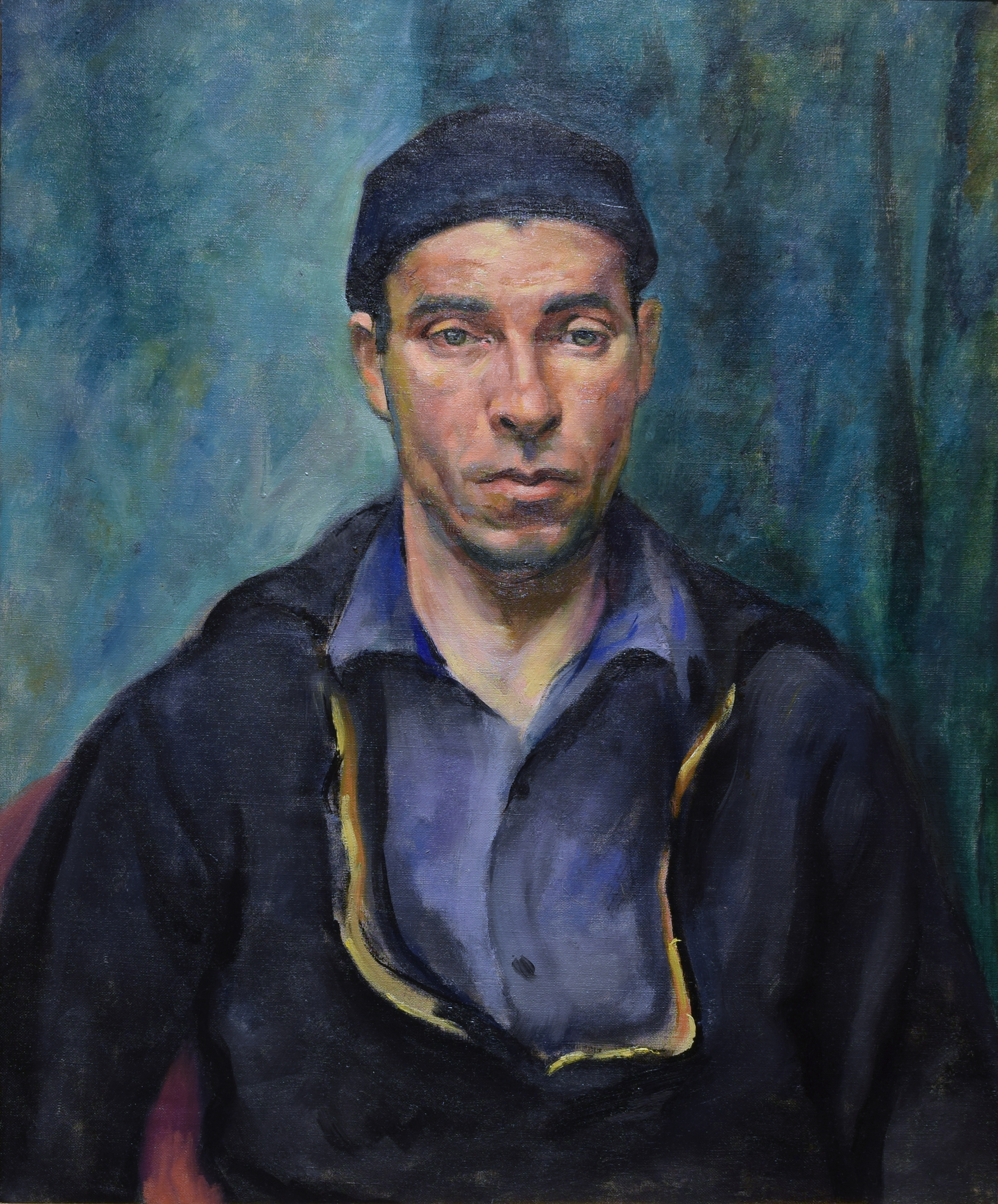
Portrait of a Man by Roswell Theordore Weidner, c. 1935, oil on canvas. Courtesy of the Reading Public Museum, Reading, Pennsylvania.

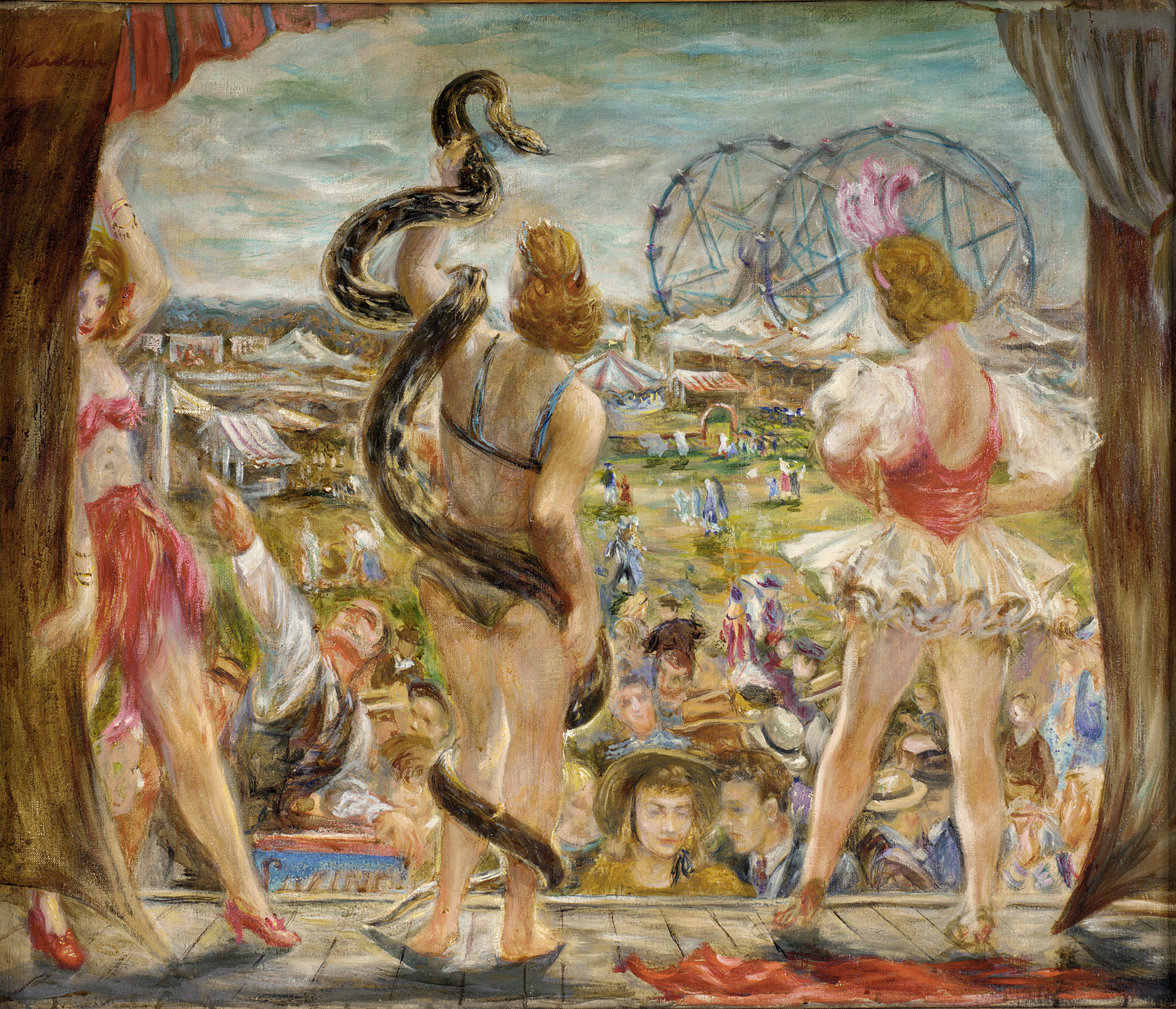
The Country Fair by Roswell Weidner, c. 1938, oil on canvas. Collection of the Pennsylvania Academy of the Fine Arts

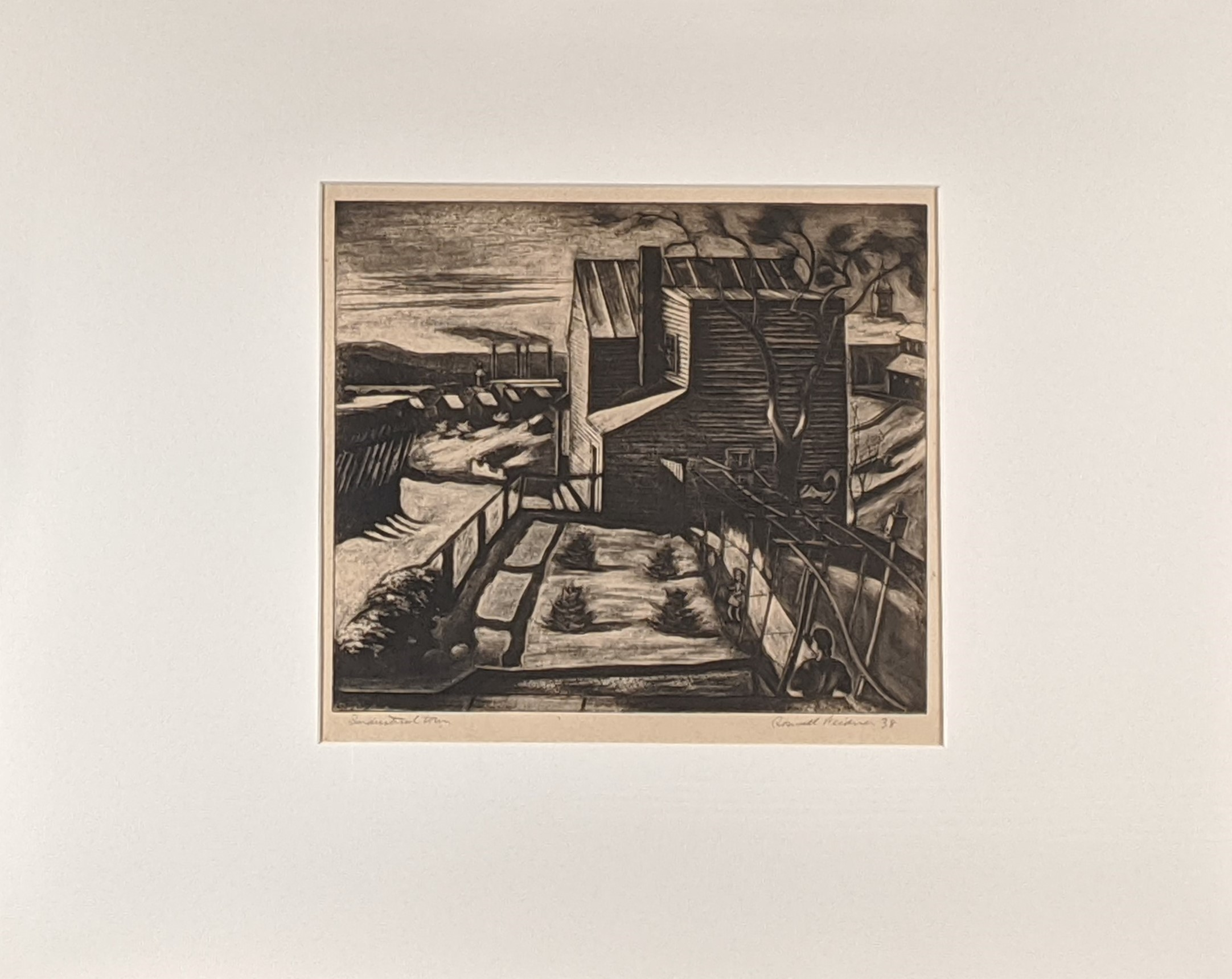
Industrial Town 2 by Roswell Weidner, c. 1938 (see carborundum printmaking). Shown at the 1939 New York World's Fair

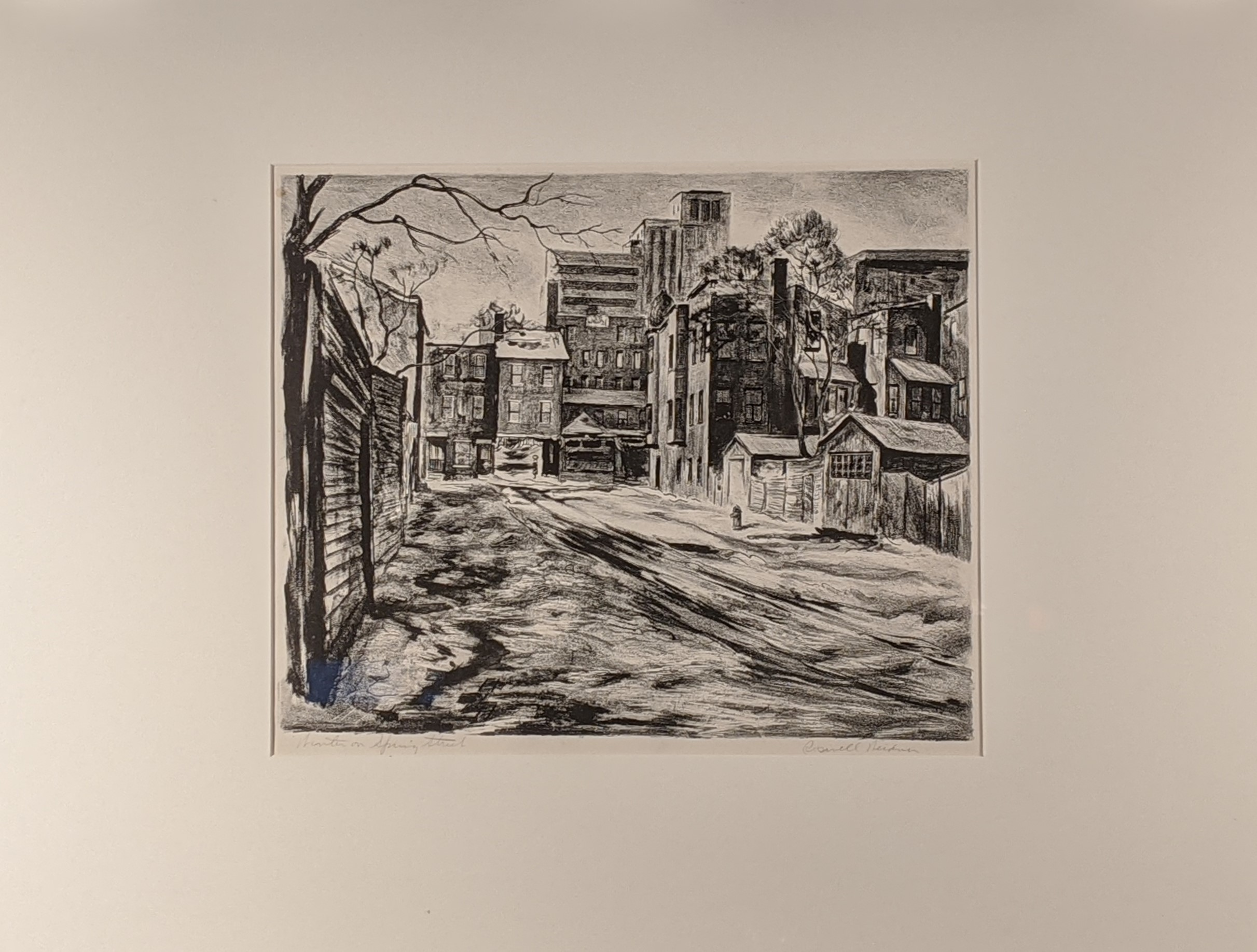
Winter on Spring Street by Roswell Weidner, c. 1938, lithograph. Collection of the Library of Congress

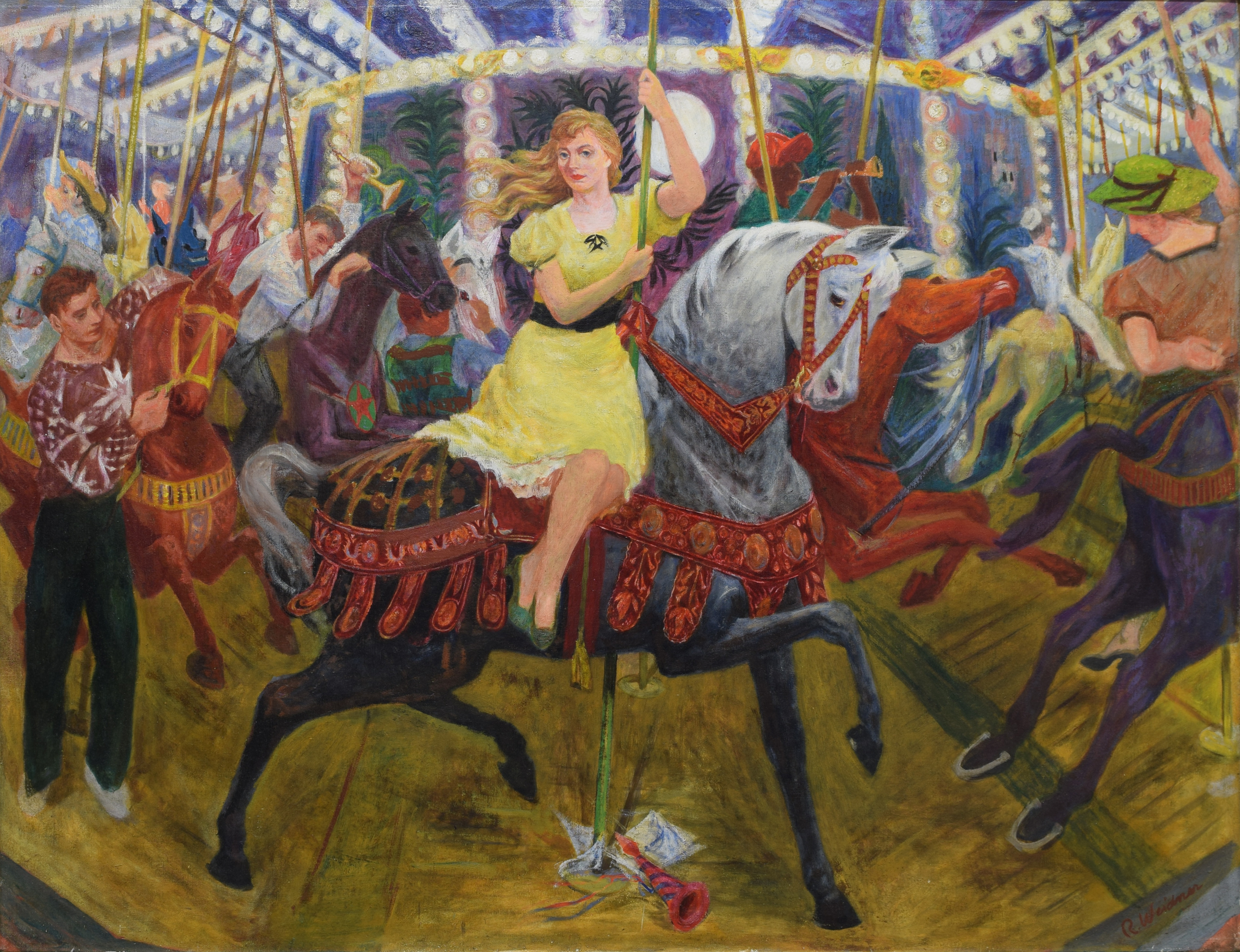
Merry-Go-Round by Roswell Theordore Weidner, c. 1948, oil on canvas. Courtesy of the Reading Public Museum, Reading, Pennsylvania.

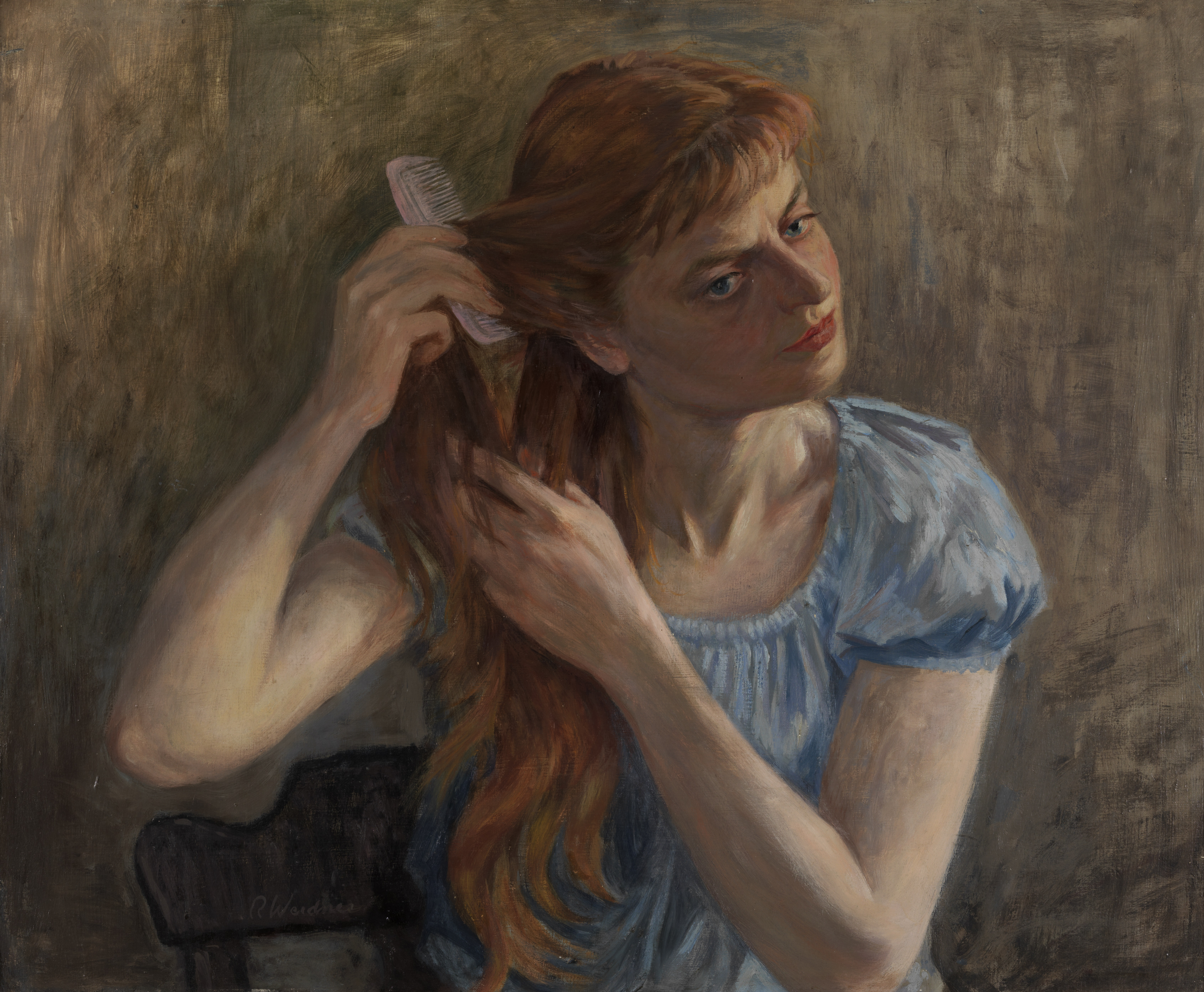
Dorcas Combing her hair by Roswell Weidner, c. 1942, oil on canvas. Collection of the Pennsylvania Academy of the Fine Arts

Burlesque Queen by Roswell Weidner, c. 1955, oil/tempera on burlap. Collection of the Pennsylvania Academy of the Fine Arts. (Interior of the Trocadero Theatre in Philadelphia, PA)

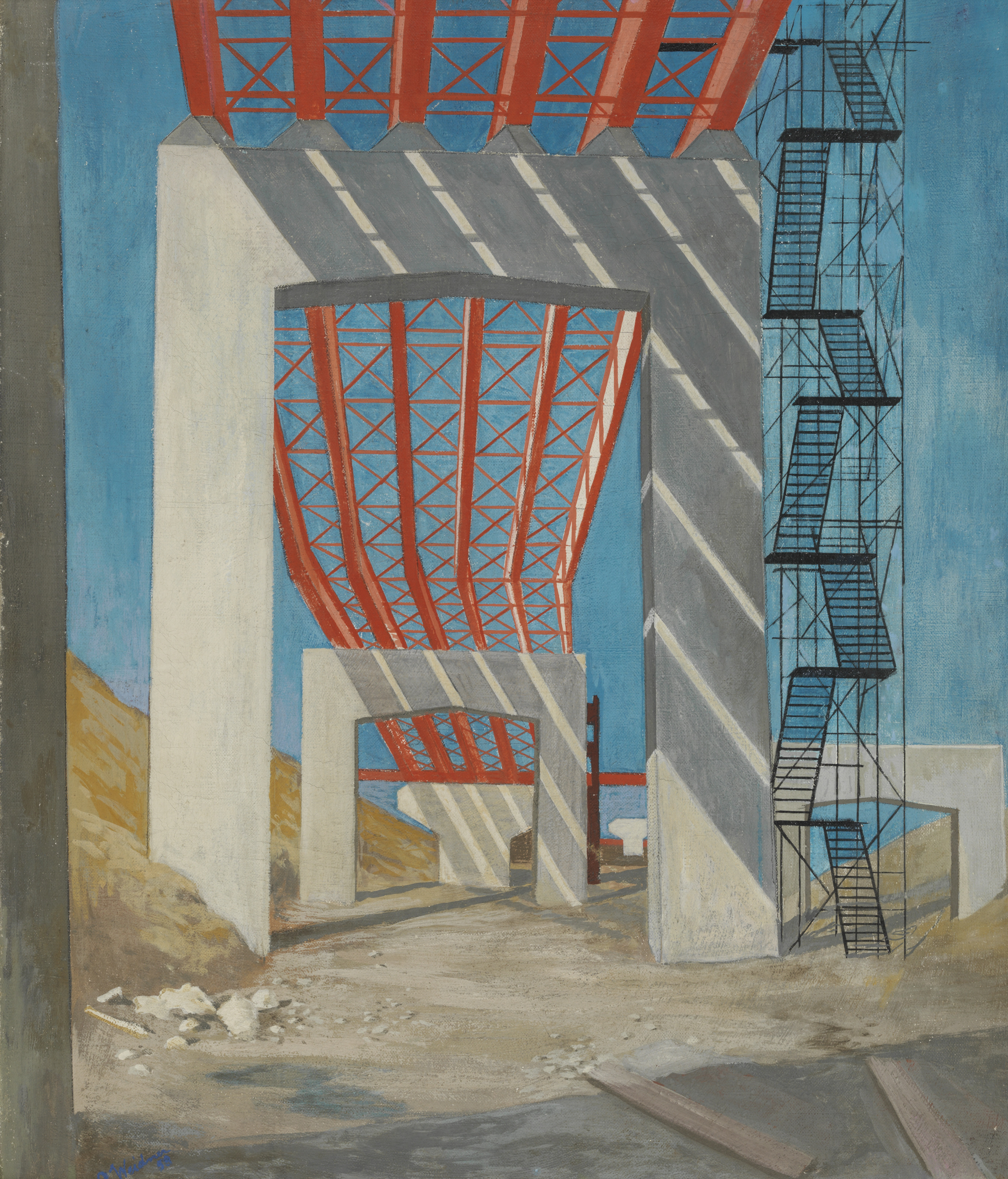
Concrete, Steel, and Sky by Roswell Weidner, 1958, casein on canvas. Collection of the Pennsylvania Academy of the Fine Arts

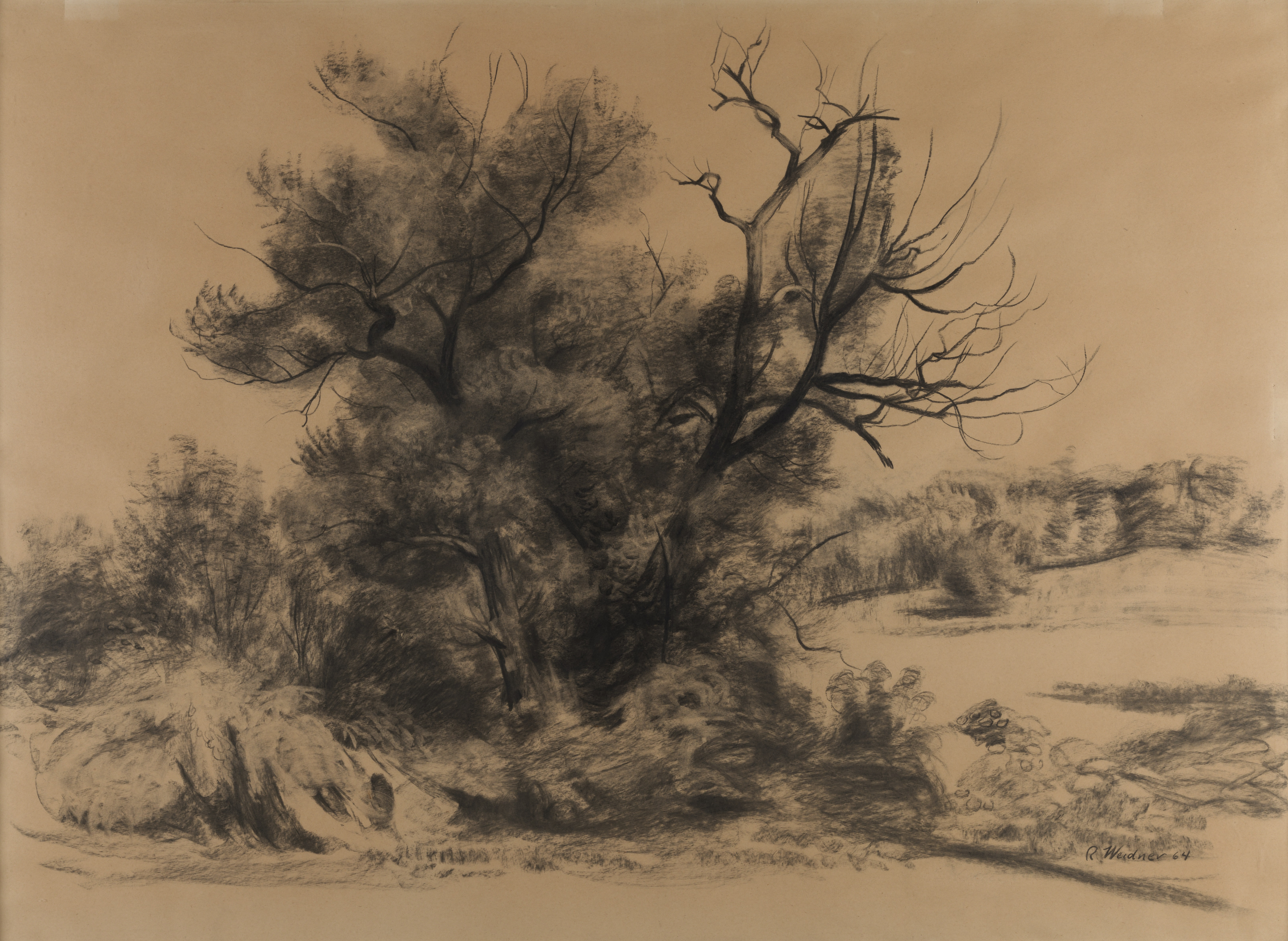
The Willow Tree by Roswell Weidner, 1964, charcoal on paper. Collection of the Pennsylvania Academy of the Fine Arts

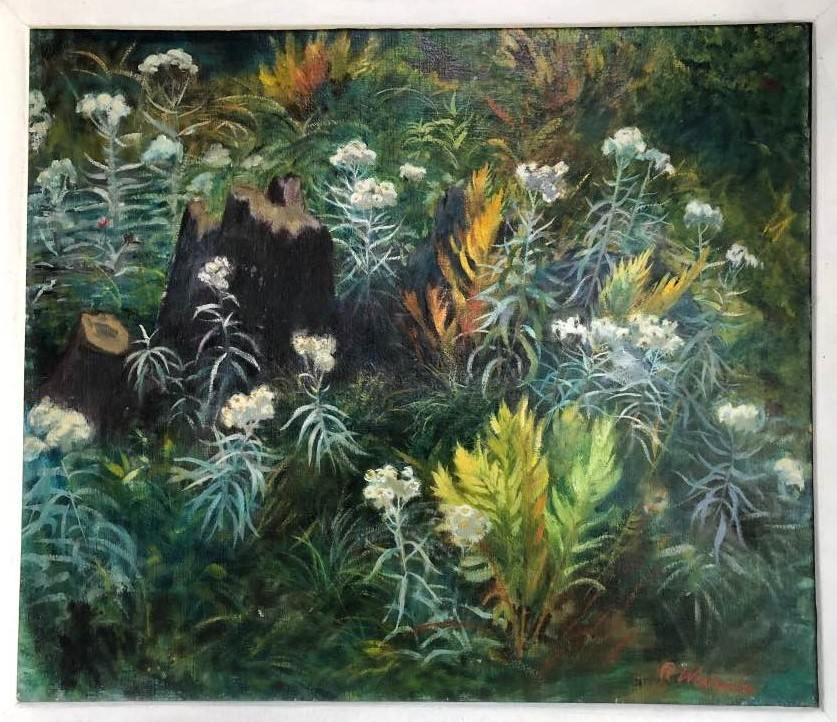
Tree Stump and Wild Flowers by Roswell Weidner, 1965, oil on canvas.

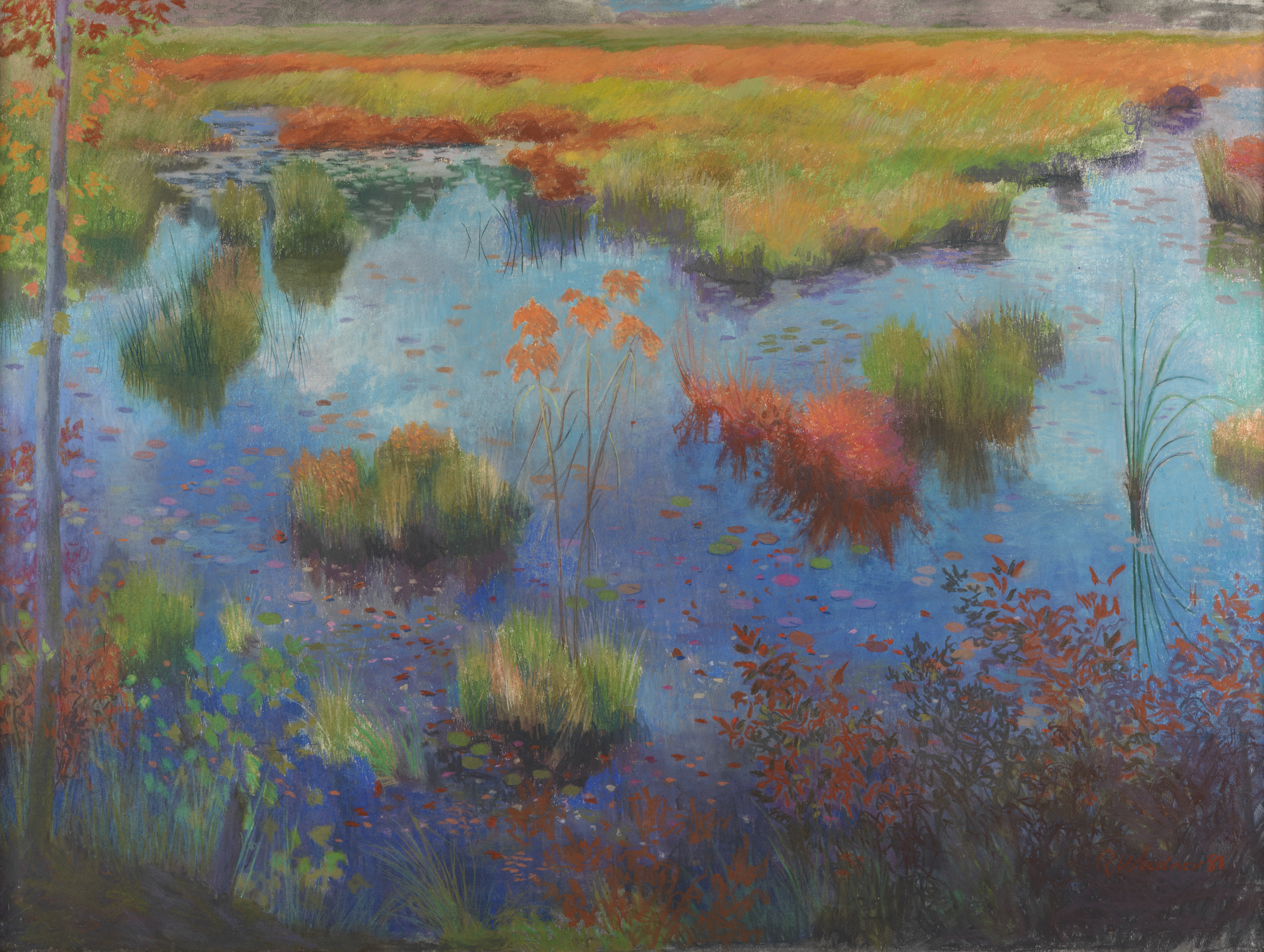
Upstream by Roswell Weidner, 1979, pastel on paper. Collection of the Pennsylvania Academy of the Fine Arts

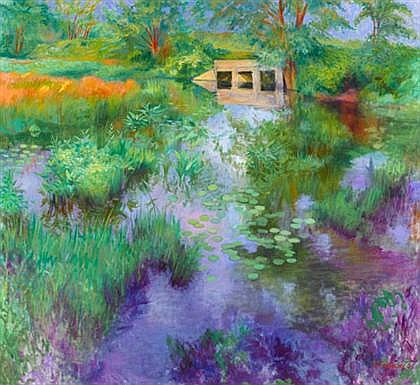
The Dam by Roswell Weidner, 1980, pastel on paper.

== Personal life ==
Weidner's personal life could be divided into two parts based on his marriages. The first part of his life continued up to the divorce from his first wife, Doris ("Dorcas") Kunzie Weidner, in 1956. Doris and Roswell went to art school together at Chester Springs and PAFA. They bought and lived on a farm in Christiana, Pennsylvania, and a home in Philadelphia near PAFA. They painted, exhibited in art shows, judged art shows, and worked on the farm together. Doris Kunzie Weidner continued to paint and live on the farm after their divorce until her death in 2000.

The second part of his personal life started in 1957 when Weidner married his second wife, Marilyn Kemp Weidner. Marilyn and Roswell Weidner lived in Center City, Philadelphia. Marilyn also painted with Roswell but their true partnership was their interest in conservation of art both on paper and canvas. Marilyn Kemp Weidner founded the Conservation Center for Art and Historic Artifacts (CCAHA) in 1977 in Philadelphia, PA, with the help of her husband. Roswell Weidner retired from teaching at PAFA in 1996 at the age of 85.

Weidner died in his home in Philadelphia with his wife Marilyn and his daughters by his side. His ashes were scattered in the New Jersey Pine Barrens.
