= Forks (The Bear) =

- The Bear episode
- Episode no.: Season 2 Episode 7
- Directed by: Christopher Storer
- Written by: Alex Russell
- Cinematography by: Andrew Wehde
- Editing by: Adam Epstein
- Production code: XCBV2007
- Original release date: June 22, 2023
- Running time: 35 minutes

Guest appearances
- Gillian Jacobs as Tiffany Jerimovich; Andrew Lopez as Garrett; Sarah Ramos as Jessica; Adam Shapiro as Ever CDC; Rene Gube as Ever GM; Olivia Colman as Chef Andrea Terry

Episode chronology
← Previous "Fishes"	Next → "Bolognese"
- The Bear season 2

"Forks" is the seventh episode of the second season of the American television comedy-drama series The Bear. It is the 15th overall episode of the series and was written by Alex Russell and directed by series creator Christopher Storer. It was released on Hulu on June 22, 2023, along with the rest of the season.

The series follows Carmen "Carmy" Berzatto, an award-winning New York City chef de cuisine, who returns to his hometown of Chicago to run his late brother Michael's failing Italian beef sandwich shop. In this episode, Richie (Ebon Moss-Bachrach) is sent to an upscale fine dining restaurant for one week to train with the staff, which proves to be a deeply transformative experience for him.

The episode was widely praised by critics for its performances, script, direction, and uplifting tone, and some named it among the best episodes of 2023. At the 76th Primetime Emmy Awards, the episode gained four nominations, including for Olivia Colman's guest appearance. Moss-Bachrach later chose the episode to support his nomination for Outstanding Supporting Actor in a Comedy Series.

== Plot ==
Carmy (Jeremy Allen White) decides to send Richie (Ebon Moss-Bachrach) to train at Ever, an upscale fine dining restaurant, for one week. Richie is annoyed at having to arrive at the restaurant by 6 a.m. daily to do nothing but shine forks. He expresses his disdain for the work to his supervisor Garrett (Andrew Lopez); Garrett takes him outside and tells him that the restaurant is built on excellence and respect, and that Richie must respect himself as well. Suitably chastised, Richie has a change of heart and commits himself to upholding Ever's high standards of excellence.

Richie's ex-wife Tiff (Gillian Jacobs) calls to inform him that she is now getting married, devastating him. The next day, however, Garrett relieves Richie of his fork-cleaning duties to come observe the front-of-house staff, having him change into a suit. Richie discovers the meticulous system the staff uses to keep track of orders and learn about the customers, as well as how the maître d'hôtel Jessica (Sarah Ramos) expedites the busy service. Richie is particularly impressed by the lengths the staff go to provide special, personalized experiences for the guests, and himself serves a plate of deep dish pizza (which he orders and picks up from Chicago's iconic Pequod's pizzeria) to a table of delighted tourists.

Richie is emboldened by the experience and realizes how much the high standards of a fine-dining kitchen can foster personal growth. Garrett later tells Richie that the job helped him overcome his alcoholism, and that he has since dedicated his life to service. Richie inquires about a full-time position at the restaurant, but Garrett says it is not up to him.

Richie calls Carmy, accusing him of sending him to Ever just to get rid of him, which he denies. On his last day, Richie solemnly polishes forks, and decides to explore the rest of the kitchen. He runs into the owner, Chef Terry (Olivia Colman), who is peeling mushrooms. As he helps her, she opens up about what led her to open Ever, recalling that after the failure of her first restaurant, she discovered her deceased father's journals from his time in the military, and observed how he took care to document the finer details of his experiences. She realized that it is never too late to start over, and opened a new restaurant built on the principle of time well spent. As Terry is about to tell Richie how her father would sign off his journal entries, she is called away to help Jessica; before leaving, Terry tells Richie that Carmy believes in him, and that he is good with people. After she leaves, Richie stares silently at the restaurant's slogan on wall: "Every second counts", and realizes that it was how Terry's father signed off his journals.

== Production ==
=== Development ===
In May 2023, Hulu confirmed that the episode would be titled "Forks", and was to be directed by series creator Christopher Storer and written by Alex Russell. It was Russell's first writing credit, and Storer's ninth directing credit.

=== Writing ===
The scene where Tiff calls Richie to reveal her engagement was "not in the original script" and added the weekend before filming. Ebon Moss-Bachrach suggested that Richie bring up the Taylor Swift concert tickets, "Obviously, trying to get back together with her." He was "deeply moved" by the line "Carmy says you're good with people", explaining "For Richie, it seemed like everything was heading towards this revelation, his need to have some validation." On his scene with Colman, he said, "The point of that, I think, was to trigger some sort of frustration or physical behavior but stay in character. That may not be what the scene with Chef Terry was about, which is coming together, but it did remind me of acting class years ago."

=== Filming ===
The episode was filmed on location at Chicago's two-Michelin-starred restaurant Ever, and takes place at a fictionalized version of the restaurant (which, in the series, boasts three Michelin stars). The restaurant was shut down for one week and turned off its online reservation system to accommodate the filming schedule, and head chef Curtis Duffy cooked all the meals featured in the episode.

Moss-Bachrach explained that as Richie is a known fan of Ridley Scott, the episode wanted to illustrate it. The art department compiled some of his works in the episode; posters for Alien and White Squall, and a novelization of Black Rain are seen in Richie's apartment.

=== Cinematography ===
Andrew Wehde, The Bear cinematographer since season one, leaned on the visual style of Michael Mann for the look of "Forks", telling Immersive Media, "Thematically, it's dark and it's in the city. It's at night, it's urban, and his storyline is just so fun in it." The color grading also played a factor in the look of the episode, said Wehde: "Our show is very much in that cool tone, kind of shadow world anyways, with a lot of the warmth coming from The Bear's restaurant in general and the warmth of the city's brownstones and wood tones, things like that. For us, this was a time to put Richie in the blue world that Carmy is always in when he's in the kitchen. It's always cool or bluer...It didn't change much from how we shot it. It just really was the way we graded it in color later on."

=== Music ===
The episode prominently features "Love Story (Taylor's Version)" by Taylor Swift, in reference to Swift being Richie's daughter's favorite artist. Executive producer Josh Senior stated that it was not difficult to secure the rights to the track, noting that Swift was "exceedingly generous and cool with one of our actors singing along to the song. Those are things that sometimes people just say no to, and that was probably one of the easiest songs to clear." In addition to "Love Story", the episode features "Glass, Concrete and Stone" by David Byrne, the track "Diamond Diary" from Tangerine Dream's score the 1981 Michael Mann film Thief, and three pieces from Trent Reznor and Atticus Ross' score for the 2019 film Waves. The Reznor–Ross pieces used include "Bad News," as Richie explores Ever early on his first day, and "The Light Shines Through," playing as Ever staffers plate up beautiful food, immediately after Tiff tells Richie she is engaged to marry another man.

== Reception ==
=== Critical reviews ===
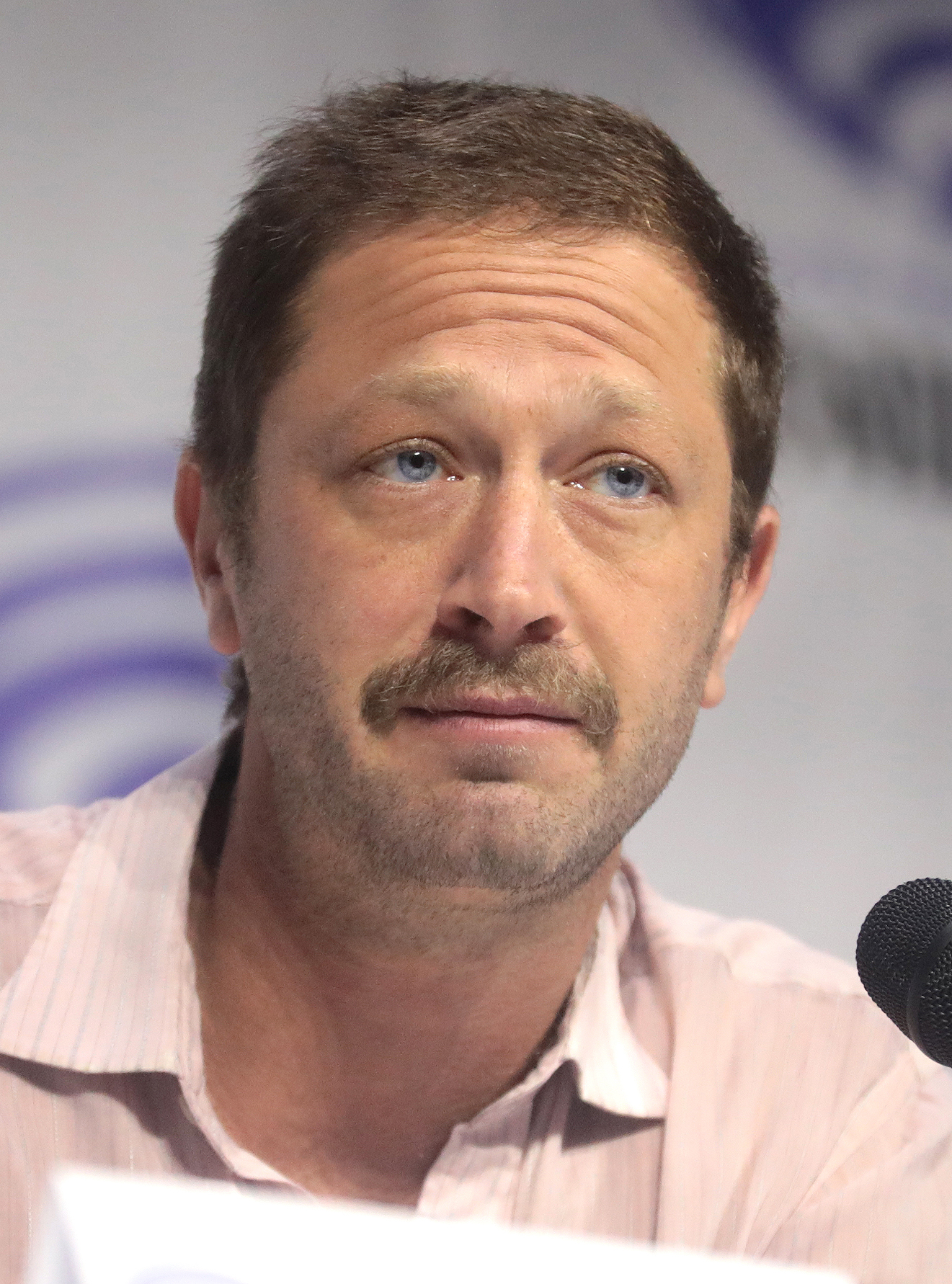
Ebon Moss-Bachrach's performance garnered critical acclaim and earned him his second Primetime Emmy Award win.

"Forks" received widespread acclaim from critics. Daniel D'Addario of Variety wrote, "Moments like this, in which two people in the culinary trenches achieve a certain sublimity while their hands are working, are ones of real connection that rely on character, situation and a lightness of touch that The Bear, contra its most attention-getting moments, wears well. More of this, please, chef."

Alan Sepinwall of Rolling Stone named the episode as his favorite of the season and wrote, "It's fascinating to see Richie fall in love with the place so quickly, yet still feel like Carmy sent him there to get rid of him for a while. But it speaks to Richie's pathologically low self-esteem. And in an incredibly charming and relaxed scene to close the episode, the celebrated Chef Terry tells Richie, unprompted, that Carmy believes in him. "He said you're good with people," she adds. "He's not wrong." Between those words of encouragement and her "Every Second Counts" motto, Richie returns to The Bear a changed man. He wears suits now. He knows how to manage. He has become a fiend for detail himself, rejecting a potential hostess because she didn't recognize his Princess and the Pea-style gambit with a misaligned place setting."

Marah Eakin of Vulture gave the episode a perfect 5 star out of 5 rating and wrote, "It's a lesson you've got to hope Richie takes to heart, and this episode suggests he will. Sure, he's 45, but he's not dead, and he knows now what he loves and sees the purpose he was flailing after back in episode one. Let's see if he can make something out of the years — and episodes — left to come." A.J. Daulerio of Decider wrote, "What Richie initially thought was Carmy's attempt to get rid of him, as it turns out, was actually a gesture of good faith. Richie has a purpose, and he's needed if The Bear is to succeed."

Alec Smith of Collider wrote, "With the suit on, he feels a sense of professionalism, and the armor, as he calls it, amplifies and demands his sense of respect — respect not only for others but himself as well, something Richie has always struggled with. From this point on in Season 2, Richie continues to show up in a suit, proving just how impactful his time staging was." Steve Greene of IndieWire wrote, "It's the capper on an episode that does everything The Bear does best. It grabs a little musical help. It captures the cacophony of a kitchen humming along as intended. And it situates all that orchestrated chaos within a city and the lives of the people who call it home. "Mangia!" indeed."

Max Covill of Paste wrote, "There's intrigue in these chefs explaining how they came to this business, and why it's so rewarding for them. That's when The Bear itself is at its most rewarding. Richie's personal growth in "Forks" helps to create what is arguably the season's finest episode, and I can't wait to see how Richie continues to let it rip." Liz Shannon Miller of Consequence wrote, "The brilliance of "Forks" isn't limited to its existence as a stand-alone installment — the very best TV shows know how to balance standalone stories with the overall flow of a season, and in the case of The Bear Season 2, this episode follows "Fishes," a 66-minute descent into the depths of family holiday hell. Surviving "Fishes" creates a deep need for some sort of solace; while at first "Forks" does not seem like it'd be the solution, the catharsis it delivers is profound, all bound up in the most unexpected needle drop of the season, as Richie's path to enlightenment becomes synonymous with (of all things) "Love Story (Taylor's Version).""

The episode was included in many publications as among the best TV episodes of 2023, including Rolling Stone, Polygon, Entertainment Weekly, TV Guide, and The A.V. Club.

=== Accolades ===
Award	Category	Nominee(s)	Result	Ref.
ACE Eddie Awards	Best Edited Single-Camera Comedy Series	Adam Epstein	Nominated	
Cinema Audio Society Awards	Outstanding Achievement in Sound Mixing for a Television Series – Half Hour	Scott D. Smith, Steve "Major" Giammaria, Patrick Christensen, and Ryan Collison	Won	
Primetime Emmy Awards	Outstanding Supporting Actor in a Comedy Series	Ebon Moss-Bachrach	Won	
Primetime Creative Arts Emmy Awards	Outstanding Cinematography for a Single-Camera Series (Half-Hour)	Andrew Wehde	Won	
Primetime Creative Arts Emmy Awards	Outstanding Guest Actress in a Comedy Series	Olivia Colman	Nominated	
Primetime Creative Arts Emmy Awards	Outstanding Sound Editing for a Comedy or Drama Series (Half-Hour) and Animation	Steve "Major" Giammaria, Andrea Bella, Evan Benjamin, Jonathan Fuhrer, Annie Taylor, Jason Lingle, Jeff Lingle, Leslie Bloome, and Shaun Brennan	Won	
Primetime Creative Arts Emmy Awards	Outstanding Sound Mixing for a Comedy or Drama Series (Half-Hour) and Animation	Steve "Major" Giammaria, Scott D. Smith, Patrick Christensen, and Ryan Collison	Won	
Writers Guild of America Awards	Episodic Comedy	Alex Russell	Nominated	

== See also ==
- List of television episodes listed among the best
