= Jess (The Bear) =

Fictional character, The Bear TV series

- Sarah Ramos as Jess
- First appearance: "Forks"; June 22, 2023
- Last appearance: "The Original Beef of Chicagoland"; June 25, 2026
- Created by: Christopher Storer
- Portrayed by: Sarah Ramos

In-universe information
- Full name: Jessica
- Nickname: Chef Jess
- Occupation: Restaurant expediter

Jess is a fictional character on the FX Network television series The Bear. She is played by Sarah Ramos beginning in the episode "Forks." She appeared in 17 episodes of The Bear.

== Casting ==
Series creator Christopher Storer wrote the part with Ramos in mind. She told L'Officiel magazine in 2025:

I've known Chris Storer, the show's creator, for like 10 years—we met at a meeting for a movie that didn't end up getting made. It was a good meeting; I think we talked about Taylor Swift. We didn't chat much after that, but then I wrote a short story that was published in an Australian zine—you had to pay, like, $25 just for shipping. Most of my friends didn't even read it, but I ran into Chris at an event and he was like, 'Hey, I loved your short story.' I was like, 'I'm sorry, what?' I clocked him as being a unique specimen in Hollywood—one who's not only reading short stories, but ordering them from Australia. He's always been supportive of me as a writer and director, too. I was stoked for him to have a smash hit when The Bear came out, and for him to invite me to join that...I was beyond touched. He could have had literally anybody in Hollywood play this part. And he asked me.

Storer also cast Ramos as the female lead opposite The Bear star and executive producer Rene Gube in a 2024 long-form Coca-Cola Company commercial called "New Guy."

== Biography ==
Jessica was introduced in the season two episode "Forks" when Richie (Ebon Moss-Bachrach) was a front of house stage at Ever. Jess works as the expediter at the three-Michelin-star Chicago restaurant.

Later, when Ever closes its doors, Richie hires Jess, Rene (Rene Gube), and Garrett (Andrew Lopez) to work at the struggling Bear restaurant. Ramos has stated that Jess is "there to pay forward the training, encouragement, and tough love she received while she was working her way up the restaurant ranks." Ramos has also stated that Jess "really worked hard and did the grind, so she brings a sense that change is possible." According to Ramos, "One of the best notes I got for her character was from Coco Storer, who's the show's culinary producer. While everyone else is freaking out, Jess is like, 'This is no big deal. I've seen way worse.'"

Jess wears a checkered-flag lapel pin and her dad was involved in professional auto racing, possibly as part of a pit crew. She has brothers.

Her connection to Richie begins in "Forks" and continues through the end of the series. Sydney (Ayo Edebiri) comments on the chemistry between Richie and Jess ("seems like there's a vibe") in season 5. It is not explicitly stated that Jess and Richie hook up but the signs point to yes. Ramos told an interviewer, "Fans are incredibly observant. They catch things I didn't even notice on my first watch. Someone on social media pointed out that in one scene, when Richie and Jess touch hands, she actually runs her thumb over the top of his hand. It's a wide shot. People had already rewatched the whole show and caught that."

== See also ==
- List of The Bear characters
- List of The Bear episodes
- Food of The Bear
- Music on The Bear
- Family on The Bear
