= Paterangi =

Settlement in Waikato, New Zealand

- Village
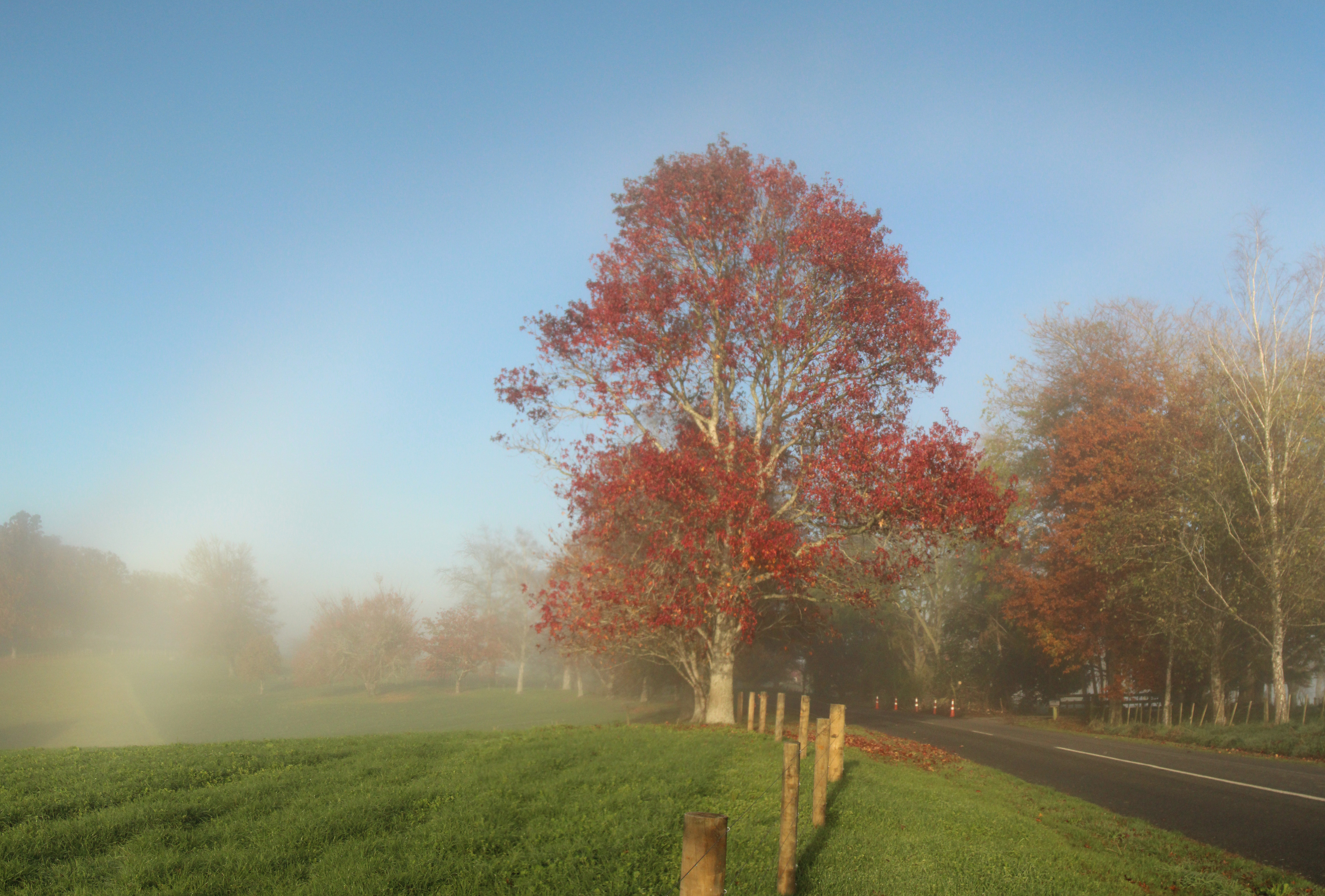
- The Paterangi pā site
- Interactive map of Paterangi
- Coordinates: 37°56′58″S 175°14′23″E
- Country: New Zealand
- Region: Waikato
- District: Waipā District
- Ward: Pirongia-Kakepuku General Ward
- Electorates: Taranaki-King Country; Hauraki-Waikato (Māori)

Government
  - Territorial Authority: Waipā District Council
  - Regional council: Waikato Regional Council
  - Mayor of Waipa: Mike Pettit
  - Taranaki-King Country MP: Barbara Kuriger
  - Hauraki-Waikato MP: Hana-Rawhiti Maipi-Clarke

Area
  - Territorial: 11.50 km^{2} (4.44 sq mi)

Population (2023 Census)
  - Territorial: 174
  - Density: 15.1/km^{2} (39.2/sq mi)
- Time zone: UTC+12 (NZST)
  - Summer (DST): UTC+13 (NZDT)

Paterangi is a settlement in the Waikato region of New Zealand's North Island. It is located 10 km northwest of Te Awamutu. It is close to the site of one of the most strongly fortified pā built during the New Zealand wars of the late 19th century.

The pā was called Tauranga Mirumiru and was home to the Ngati Apakura. The site of the pā is located on a local dairy farm.

In Paterangi lies the largest peat lake in the Waikato, Lake Ngaroto. Translated into English, Ngaroto simply means 'the lake.' In Lake Ngaroto the wooden carving identified as the Māori rainbow god 'Uenuku' was found. Uenuku now rests in the Te Awamutu Museum.

William James Scott, a Scottish-born Canadian politician moved to Paterangi in 1867 and established himself as a wealthy landowner.

== Demographics ==
Paterangi settlement and its surrounds cover 11.50 km^{2} (4.44 sq mi). The area is part of the larger Lake Ngaroto statistical area.

Historical population for Paterangi and surrounds
Year	Pop.	±% p.a.
2006	96	—
2013	120	+3.24%
2018	132	+1.92%
2023	174	+5.68%

Paterangi had a population of 174 in the 2023 New Zealand census, an increase of 42 people (31.8%) since the 2018 census, and an increase of 54 people (45.0%) since the 2013 census. There were 87 males and 84 females in 57 dwellings. 5.2% of people identified as LGBTIQ+. The median age was 35.1 years (compared with 38.1 years nationally). There were 51 people (29.3%) aged under 15 years, 24 (13.8%) aged 15 to 29, 78 (44.8%) aged 30 to 64, and 21 (12.1%) aged 65 or older.

People could identify as more than one ethnicity. The results were 93.1% European (Pākehā), 17.2% Māori, 3.4% Asian, and 3.4% other, which includes people giving their ethnicity as "New Zealander". English was spoken by 96.6%, and other languages by 3.4%. No language could be spoken by 3.4% (e.g. too young to talk). New Zealand Sign Language was known by 1.7%. The percentage of people born overseas was 12.1, compared with 28.8% nationally.

Religious affiliations were 31.0% Christian, and 3.4% Hindu. People who answered that they had no religion were 55.2%, and 8.6% of people did not answer the census question.

Of those at least 15 years old, 27 (22.0%) people had a bachelor's or higher degree, 84 (68.3%) had a post-high school certificate or diploma, and 15 (12.2%) people exclusively held high school qualifications. The median income was $54,800, compared with $41,500 nationally. 18 people (14.6%) earned over $100,000 compared to 12.1% nationally. The employment status of those at least 15 was that 72 (58.5%) people were employed full-time and 21 (17.1%) were part-time.

=== Lake Ngaroto statistical area ===
Lake Ngaroto statistical area covers 94.58 km^{2} (36.52 sq mi) and had an estimated population of 1,310 as of June 2025, with a population density of 14 people per km^{2}.

Historical population for Lake Ngaroto
Year	Pop.	±% p.a.
2006	1,047	—
2013	1,080	+0.44%
2018	1,170	+1.61%
2023	1,278	+1.78%

Lake Ngaroto had a population of 1,278 in the 2023 New Zealand census, an increase of 108 people (9.2%) since the 2018 census, and an increase of 198 people (18.3%) since the 2013 census. There were 681 males, 597 females and 3 people of other genders in 450 dwellings. 3.3% of people identified as LGBTIQ+. The median age was 38.8 years (compared with 38.1 years nationally). There were 309 people (24.2%) aged under 15 years, 183 (14.3%) aged 15 to 29, 618 (48.4%) aged 30 to 64, and 165 (12.9%) aged 65 or older.

People could identify as more than one ethnicity. The results were 90.4% European (Pākehā); 12.7% Māori; 2.1% Pasifika; 3.8% Asian; 0.2% Middle Eastern, Latin American and African New Zealanders (MELAA); and 2.8% other, which includes people giving their ethnicity as "New Zealander". English was spoken by 97.7%, Māori language by 2.1%, and other languages by 4.7%. No language could be spoken by 2.1% (e.g. too young to talk). New Zealand Sign Language was known by 0.2%. The percentage of people born overseas was 12.0, compared with 28.8% nationally.

Religious affiliations were 32.2% Christian, 1.9% Hindu, 0.7% Māori religious beliefs, 0.2% Buddhist, 0.5% New Age, and 0.5% other religions. People who answered that they had no religion were 54.5%, and 9.4% of people did not answer the census question.

Of those at least 15 years old, 183 (18.9%) people had a bachelor's or higher degree, 627 (64.7%) had a post-high school certificate or diploma, and 156 (16.1%) people exclusively held high school qualifications. The median income was $55,500, compared with $41,500 nationally. 162 people (16.7%) earned over $100,000 compared to 12.1% nationally. The employment status of those at least 15 was that 591 (61.0%) people were employed full-time, 147 (15.2%) were part-time, and 15 (1.5%) were unemployed.

== Education ==
Paterangi School is a co-educational state primary school, with a roll of 93 as of July 2026. The school opened in 1876.

== See also ==
- Invasion of Waikato
