= Bill H. Scott =

Australian rules footballer

Bill Scott

Personal information
- Full name: Bill Scott
- Born: 3 November 1886
- Died: 10 November 1960 (aged 74)
- Original team: Euroa

Playing career^{1}
Years	Club	Games (Goals)
1910	Richmond	1 (0)
- ^{1} Playing statistics correct to the end of 1910.

Bill Scott (3 November 1886 – 10 November 1960) was a former Australian rules footballer who played with Richmond in the Victorian Football League (VFL).
