= Willie Scott =

Willie Scott is the name of:

- William Scott (actor) (1893–1967), American silent film actor
- Willie Scott (American football) (1959–2021), American football player
- Willie Scott (basketball) (1945–2026), American professional basketball player
- Willie Scott (Indiana Jones character), character in the 1984 film Indiana Jones and the Temple of Doom

== See also ==
- William Scott (disambiguation)
