= William James Scott =

Scottish-born Canadian politician (1812–1882)

William James Scott (1812–1882) was a Scottish-born farmer and political figure in Canada West. He represented South Waterloo in the Legislative Assembly of the Province of Canada from 1858 to 1861 as an independent Conservative. In Scotland he was referenced as Lord Campfield.

== Canada years ==
A native of Aberdeen, Scott came to Canada in 1832 and purchased a lot from Absalom Shade. He built a sawmill and flour mill which formed the basis for the village of New Hamburg.

He served as postmaster for New Hamburg from 1851 to 1857. Scott also was a member of the first council for Wilmot Township, serving three years as reeve, and also served on the first Waterloo County council. He raised Devon cattle and helped found the county agricultural society. Scott also served as Lieutenant-Colonel for the local militia (likely part of the volunteer of the Non-Permanent Active Militia that existed in Upper Canada).

He built his home at 3332 Bleams Road East, New Hamburg, in 1858. It is now on the register of historic places.

== Later life ==
In 1867, following his wife's death and estrangement from his daughter, Scott left Canada for New Zealand, where he settled in Paterangi becoming a wealthy landowner.
