= William Scott (archdeacon of Bombay) =

British priest

William Edward Scott was Archdeacon of Bombay from 1897 until 1907.

Scott was educated at Keble College, Oxford and ordained in 1876. After a curacy at Merton, Surrey he was Headmaster of Northallerton Grammar School then Rector of Hawthorn until 1885. He went to India as a missionary serving at Nasir-abad, Deolali, Byculla and Colaba. He was Chaplain to the Bishop of Bombay before his time as Archdeacon then Rector of Tolleshunt Knights afterwards. Later he was Chaplain at Geneva and finally Rector of Bradwell (1909–1914).

A Fellow of Bombay University he died on 29 December 1918.
