= Sarah Ramos =

American actress (born 1991)

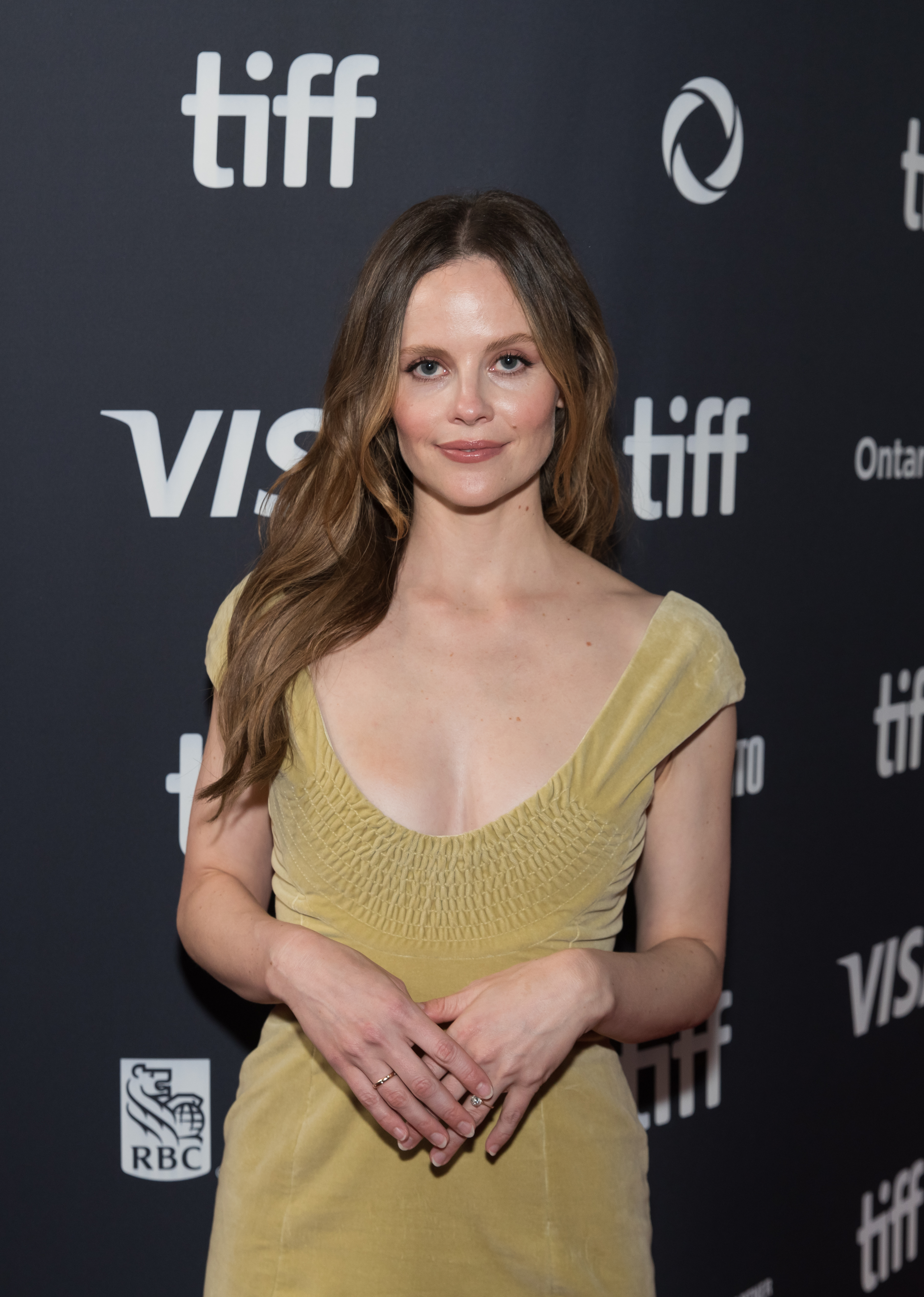
- Sarah Ramos 2025
- Born: Sarah Emily Ramos; May 21, 1991 (age 35); Los Angeles, California, U.S.
- Education: Columbia University
- Occupation: Actress
- Years active: 2001–present
- Spouse: Matt Spicer (m. 2020)

Sarah Emily Ramos (born May 21, 1991) is an American actress who began her career as a child. She is known for her roles on the television series American Dreams, Parenthood, and The Bear.

== Early life ==
Ramos was born in Los Angeles, California. Her father is of one-quarter Filipino ancestry. Her mother is Jewish. She became interested in acting at a young age. Ramos began developing her acting abilities at the age of nine, entering into formal training at Center Stage L.A. "According to her mother, 11-year-old Sarah Ramos would go to bed each night pleading to get an agent — then wake up each morning asking about the status of her parents' talent agent search." She graduated from Columbia University in May 2015.

== Career ==
Ramos began her acting career as a child in various television commercials. She gained attention as Patty Pryor in the NBC drama TV series American Dreams (2002–2005). This role garnered her acting accolades, including winning the Women's Image Network Award (WIN) for Best Actress in a TV Drama in 2003 and various nominations by the Young Artist Awards. Variety commented: "Patty is an out-and-out brat, and Ramos does it right."

In April 2006, she landed the role of Hannah Rader, a.k.a. Kate Holland, on the CW series Runaway. However, the show was canceled after one season. Ramos's other television credits include guest-starring roles in Scrubs, Close to Home, Ghost Whisperer, Law & Order, Wizards of Waverly Place, Without a Trace, Private Practice, and Lie to Me.

In 2009, she was cast as Haddie Braverman in the NBC series Parenthood. Parenthood's fourth season premiered in September 2012; however, Ramos would no longer be a regular but had a guest-starring billing as her character went to college. In the Season 5 finale, aired in April 2014, Haddie came home for the summer, bringing along a girlfriend from college. Entertainment Weekly wrote that her performance was "one of the most underrated, sustained performances on TV recently, calling upon her to express an array of moods and emotions that went well beyond the usual prime-time network-drama teen role." She returned in Season 6 for two episodes, including the series finale.

In 2011, she voiced a character for an episode of Family Guy. In May 2011, it was announced she had joined the cast of the film Predisposed, starring Jesse Eisenberg and Melissa Leo.

In 2011, she also co-wrote and co-directed a short film, The Arm, that won a Special Jury Prize for Comedic Storytelling at the Sundance Film Festival in 2012. She also directed a music video starring most of her Parenthood co-stars to the cover of "Girl on TV" sung by Landon Pigg and a short, Marry Me, for the Ally Coalition.

Ramos makes a brief appearance in the feature film The Perks of Being a Wallflower, which has a cast that includes her Parenthood co-star Mae Whitman.

Ramos wrote, directed and starred in the short film Fluffy (2016), produced by B. B. Dakota.

In 2020, Ramos and the THNK 1994 Museum published the iconic "Autograph Hound" Exhibition Book, documenting years of Ramos's celebrity encounters and sightings, following her from a starstruck young girl to a star in her own right (who still appreciates a fabulous celebrity spotting in the wild).

In 2020, she participated in Acting for a Cause, a live classic play and screenplay reading series created, directed and produced by Brando Crawford. Ramos played Lady Bracknell in The Importance of Being Earnest by Oscar Wilde. The reading raised funds for non-profit charities including Mount Sinai Medical Center.

Beginning in 2023, Ramos joined the cast of The Bear as Jess, a back-of-house staffer who excels at "expo" at Andrea Terry's three Michelin star restaurant, Ever.

In September 2024, Ramos joined the cast of Chicago Med as Dr. Caitlin Lenox as a series regular.

== Personal life ==
Ramos is married to director Matt Spicer.

== Filmography ==
=== Film ===
Year	Title	Role	Notes
2001	In Vein	Elizabeth, age 6	Short
2007	Walking Out on Love	Jackie	Short
2011	Smorgasbord	Silvie	Short
2012	Why Stop Now	Chloe	
2015	Minimum Wage	Kit	Short
2016	How to Be Single	Michelle	
2016	Slash	Marin	
2016	Fluffy	Grace Banks	Short; also director and writer
2017	We Don't Belong Here	Jill	
2017	The Boy Downstairs	Meg	
2018	Ask for Jane	Maggie	
2019	Milkshake	Casting Associate	Short
2022	Babylon	Harriet Rothschild	
2025	The Napa Boys	Puck	

=== Television ===
Year	Title	Role	Notes
2002–2005	American Dreams	Patty Pryor	Main role
2005	Scrubs	Lindsay	Episode: "My Big Move"
2006	Close to Home	Kirsten Sullivan	Episode: "Dead or Alive"
2006–2008	Runaway	Hannah Rader / Kate Holland	Main role; 10 episodes
2007	Law & Order	Mary Reese	Episode: "Good Faith"
2008	Wizards of Waverly Place	Isabella	Episode: "Beware Wolf"
2008	Without a Trace	Darby Wechsler	Episode: "True/False"
2009	Lie to Me	Riley Berenson	Episode: "A Perfect Score"
2009	Ghost Whisperer	Courtney	Episode: "Greek Tragedy"
2010-2012 & 2014-2015	Parenthood	Haddie Braverman	Main role (seasons 1–3); recurring role (season 4); guest (seasons 5–6)
2011	Family Guy	Teenage Girl	Episode: "Brothers & Sisters"; voice role
2012	Robot Chicken	Sunni Gummi / Andrea	Episode: "In Bed Surrounded by Loved Ones"; voice role
2013	Private Practice	Holly	Episode: "In Which We Say Goodbye"
2016	Drunk History	Maggie Fox	Episode: "Siblings"
2016 & 2019	The Affair	Audrey	Guest role; 3 episodes
2017–2018	Midnight, Texas	Creek Lovell	Main role (season 1); recurring role (season 2)
2017	City Girl	Casey Jones	Also director and writer
2017	The Long Road Home	Brie	Episode: "A City Called Heaven"
2019	Gone Hollywood	Julie Grenfell	Unaired television series
2020	Acting for a Cause	Lady Bracknell	Episode: "The Importance of Being Earnest"
2022–2023	Winning Time: The Rise of the Lakers Dynasty	Cheryl Pistono	Main role
2022	A Kismet Christmas	Sarah Collins/Sarah Grace	Television film
2023	Christmas in Notting Hill	Georgia	Television film
2023–2026	The Bear	Jessica	17 episodes; Guest role (2-3), Recurring role (4-5)
2024–present	Chicago Med	Dr. Caitlin Lenox	Main role

=== Director ===
Year	Title	Notes
2012	The Arm	Short film; also writer
2020	Marvel's 616	Episode: "Unboxed"

== Awards and nominations ==
Award	Year	Category	Nominated work	Result	Refs
Actor Awards	2026	Outstanding Performance by an Ensemble in a Comedy Series	The Bear	Nominated	
ALMA Award	2011	Favorite TV Actress – Supporting Role	Parenthood	Nominated	
ALMA Award	2012	Favorite TV Actress – Supporting Role	Parenthood	Nominated	
Young Artist Award	2003	Best Ensemble in a TV Series	American Dreams	Nominated	
Young Artist Award	2004	Best Performance in a TV Series – Young Actress Age Ten or Younger	American Dreams	Nominated	
Young Artist Award	2005	Best Performance in a TV Series – Supporting Young Actress	American Dreams	Nominated	
Women's Image Network	2003	Best Actress in a Drama Series	American Dreams	Won	
