= William B. Scott (magazine editor) =

American magazine editor

William B. Scott is an American magazine editor. He was a former Rocky Mountain Bureau Chief for Aviation Week & Space Technology magazine. During his 22 years with the publication, he also served as Senior National Editor, Avionics Editor and Senior Engineering Editor. He is a co-author of three books: "Counterspace: The Next Hours of World War III"; "Space Wars: The First Six Hours of World War III", and "Inside the Stealth Bomber: The B-2 Story".

He holds a Bachelor of Science degree in electrical engineering from California State University, Sacramento, and is a graduate of the U.S. Air Force Test Pilot School at Edwards Air Force Base, California. In 12 years of military and civilian flight testing, plus evaluating aircraft for Aviation Week, he has logged approximately 2,000 flight hours on 80 aircraft types.
