= Bill Scott (artist) =

American painter

Bill Scott (born 1956 Bryn Mawr, Pennsylvania) is a contemporary abstract painter and printmaker who works and lives in Philadelphia. Scott studied painting at the Pennsylvania Academy of the Fine Arts from 1974 to 1979, and with the painter Jane Piper (1916–1991).

In 1980, while living in Paris on a travel prize, he met the American abstract expressionist painter Joan Mitchell (1925–1992). In subsequent years he stayed at her home in Vétheuil and painted in her studio. After Mitchell died, he wrote an appreciation of her published in Art in America.

Since 1999 Scott has been making intaglio prints with the C.R. Ettinger Studio and in 2004 was awarded a grant from the Independence Foundation in support of his work in color printmaking. He has made commissioned etchings for the Print Club of Cleveland and for the Print Center and Fleisher Art Memorial, both in Philadelphia. In 2016 an exhibition devoted to his intaglio prints was presented by Philadelphia’s Cerulean Arts Gallery.

His paintings, pastels, and intaglio prints are in public collections including the British Museum, Cleveland Museum of Art, the Pennsylvania Academy of the Fine Arts, and Woodmere Art Museum. In 2017 Rider University organized an exhibition including 22 of his works dating from 1997 to 2017.

In 1991, in memory of his parents, Scott donated a collection of works on paper by contemporary women artists to Bryn Mawr College. Since 2011 he is a board member and chair of the Collections Committee at Woodmere Art Museum in Philadelphia.

== Style ==
Scott’s artworks blur the boundaries between abstraction and representation. Drawing from both nature and imagination, the paintings are not expressions of tangible realities but rather "ephemeral remembrances". Exploration of color and form stands at the core of Scott’s work, where blocks of color, patterns and line are overlapped to form dynamic compositions that appear visually akin to collage.

The paintings rely on extremely vivid color palettes, applied in fields of color that evoke both urban and pastoral scenes. In this sense, Scott’s work continues the tradition of abstracted landscapes mastered by aestheticist artists such as Whistler. The artist continually turns to flora and fauna for his subjects, stating that "underbrush and floral subjects have long been recurrent-if not paramount-to my painted imagery."

In the past decade many of Scott’s artworks display direct engagement with specific historical paintings by artists of particular significance to his own artistic development such as Pierre-Auguste Renoir (1841–1914), Berthe Morisot (1841–1895) and Henri Matisse (1869–1954). In paintings of the past decade their works imprint themselves directly onto Scott’s own work, whereby he translates formal qualities of these master’s works onto abstract and colorful canvases.
