= Bill Scott (footballer, born 1890) =

Australian rules footballer

Personal information
- Full name: William Edgar Scott
- Born: 19 February 1890; Bairnsdale, Victoria
- Died: 17 March 1968 (aged 78); St Kilda, Victoria
- Height: 188 cm (6 ft 2 in)
- Weight: 89 kg (196 lb)

Playing career^{1}
Years	Club	Games (Goals)
1912	Fitzroy	3 (1)
1915	Essendon	4 (0)
Total		7 (1)
- ^{1} Playing statistics correct to the end of 1915.

William Edgar Scott (19 February 1890 – 17 March 1968) was an Australian rules footballer who played with Fitzroy and Essendon in the Victorian Football League (VFL).

Scott, described as "a tramway employee who hails from Bairnsdale" "with some reputation as a follower", played three games for Fitzroy in the middle of the 1912 season.

Scott subsequently transferred to Fitzroy Juniors where he played for the 1913 season . In 1914 he tried out with St Kilda but in June 1914 he transferred from St Kilda to Williamstown in the Victorian Football Association.

In 1915 Scott re-appeared in VFL ranks with Essendon, this time making four appearances.
