= Bill Scott (footballer, born 1880) =

Australian rules footballer

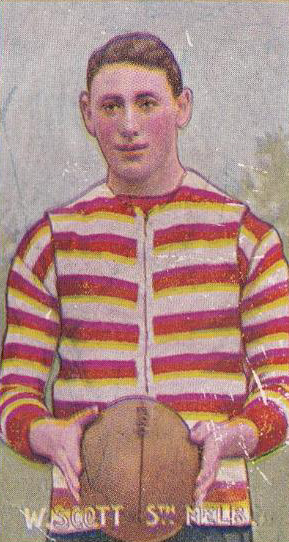
- Cigarette card of Scott in 1906

Personal information
- Full name: William Francis Scott
- Born: 26 April 1880; Geelong, Victoria
- Died: 11 September 1969 (aged 89); Upper Ferntree Gully, Victoria
- Original team: Brighton (MJFA)

Playing career^{1}
Years	Club	Games (Goals)
1901–06	South Melbourne	61 (26)
- ^{1} Playing statistics correct to the end of 1906.

William Francis Scott (26 April 1880 – 11 September 1969) was an Australian rules footballer who played with South Melbourne in the Victorian Football League (VFL).
