= Bill Scott (Irish footballer) =

Irish footballer

Personal information
- Full name: William John Scott
- Place of birth: Ireland
- Position: Full back

Senior career*
| Years | Team | Apps | (Gls) |
| – | Belfast Celtic | | |
| 1931–1933 | Macclesfield | 68 | (1) |
| 1933–1935 | Darlington | 73 | (0) |
| 1935–1936 | Stockport County | 11 | (0) |
| 1936–1937 | Cardiff City | 17 | (0) |
| – | Wigan Athletic | | |

International career
| 1926–1927 | Irish League XI | 3 | (0) |
- * Club domestic league appearances and goals

William John Scott (fl. 1930s), known as Bill or Billy Scott, was an Irish footballer who made 101 appearances in the Football League playing as a full back for Darlington, Stockport County and Cardiff City in the 1930s. Before leaving his native Ireland, he played for Belfast Celtic and appeared three times for the Irish League representative team, and played non-league football in England for Macclesfield and Wigan Athletic.

== Football career ==
Scott was born in Ireland. He played for Belfast Celtic, and was capped three times for the Irish League representative team in 1926 and 1927. He and full-back partner Burnison "got through a lot of hard work with credit", according to the Times, in a 6–1 defeat to the English Football League XI in Belfast in October 1926, and he played in a 5–2 defeat to the Scottish League XI in Edinburgh and in a 1–1 draw in Belfast against the Free State League in March 1927.

He came to England, where he captained Manchester Central before joining Macclesfield, with whom he won successive Cheshire League in 1932 and 1933. He then spent two seasons playing in the Football League Third Division North for Darlington and one with Stockport County, followed by a season in the Southern Section with Cardiff City. He finished his career with Southport, but without representing them in the League, and finally returned to the Cheshire League with Wigan Athletic.
