= Expeditor =

Someone who makes something happen

An expeditor is someone who facilitates a process. It is a position or role found within project management, construction, purchasing, production control, and restaurants. One example of this is a person in a restaurant who coordinates actions between cooks and waiting staff in a restaurant, managing the flow of orders and giving real-time commands to other employees.

In a shipping logistics supply chain, an expeditor's role is primarily to look at the requirement levels in the business and fulfill the demands by either rescheduling in or rescheduling out the delivery date on the purchase order. The expeditor is also responsible for making sure there is no line stopping situation for a business. The key metrics which an expeditor influences may be - on time delivery, cash flow cycle and inventory management. An expeditor needs to be assertive and needs to know the business at high contextual levels

This is also the name used for Beech 18 aircraft by British and Commonwealth air forces (1940s-50s).
