= List of IATSE locals =

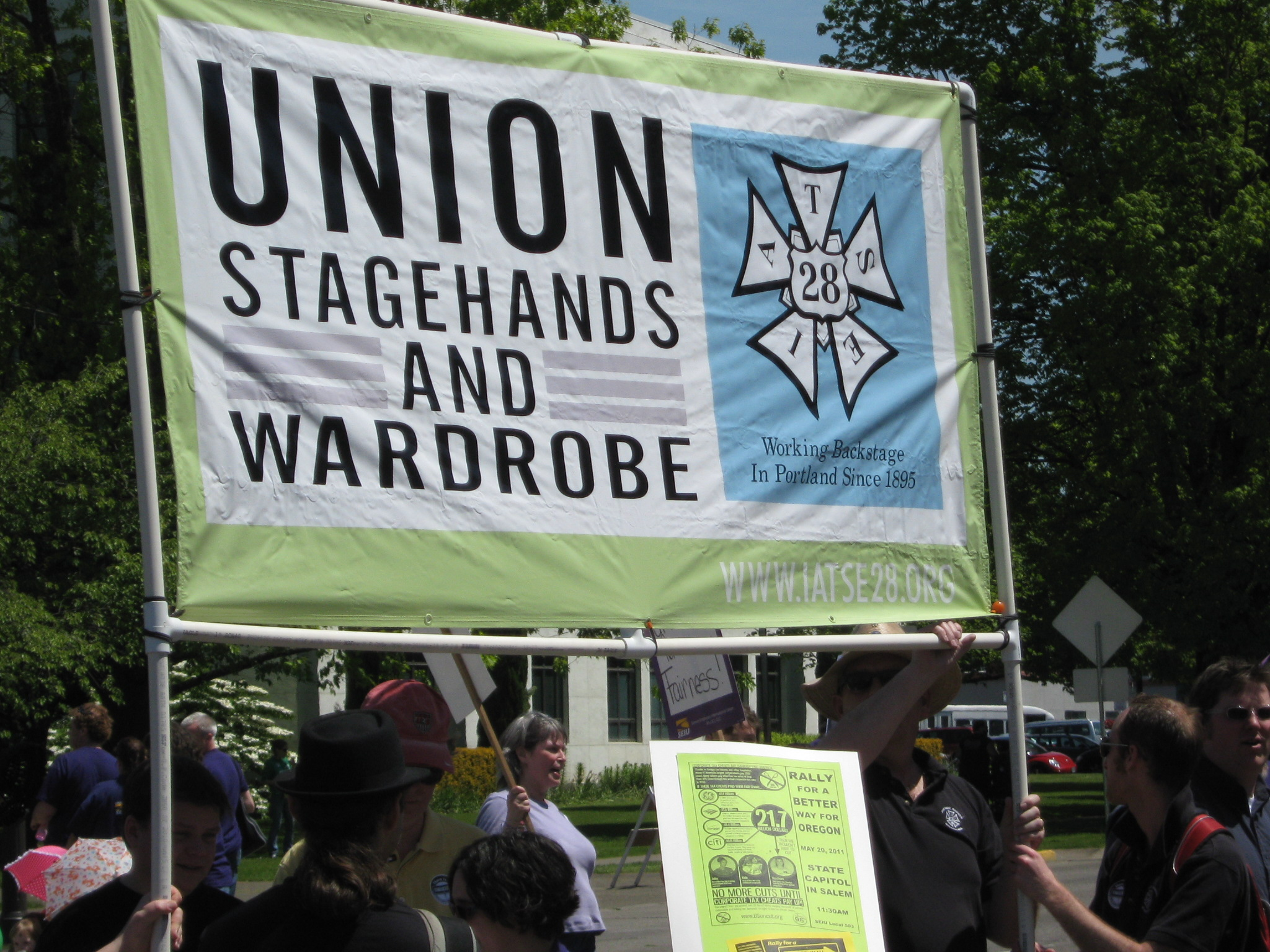
Banner of IATSE Local 28, Portland, Oregon, at a union rally

This is a list of Locals of the International Alliance of Theatrical Stage Employees.

== United States ==
=== National locals ===
| Local | Craft |
|---|---|
| 111 | Production Workers Guild |
| 444 | Golf Broadcast Technicians |
| 600 | International Cinematographers Guild |
| 700 | Motion Picture Editors Guild |
| 800 | Art Directors Guild |
| USA 829 | United Scenic Artists |
| VFX | VFX Union |

=== District 1 - Alaska, Idaho, Montana, Oregon, Washington ===
| Local | Jurisdiction | Craft(s) |
|---|---|---|
| 15 | Seattle, Washington | Stagehands |
| 28 | Portland & Salem, Oregon | Stagehands |
| 93 | Spokane, Washington | Stagehands |
| 154 | Ashland, Oregon | Stagehands |
| 240 | Billings, Montana | Mixed |
| 339 | Great Falls, Montana | Mixed |
| 488 | Pacific Northwest | Studio Mechanics |
| 675 | Eugene, Oregon | Stagehands |
| 793 | Washington & Oregon | Broadcast |
| 887 | Seattle, Washington | Theatrical Wardrobe Union |
| 918 | Anchorage, Alaska | Stagehands |
| B20 | Portland, Oregon | Front of House Employees |

=== District 2 - Arizona, California, Hawaii, Nevada ===
| Local | Jurisdiction | Craft(s) |
|---|---|---|
| 16 | San Francisco, California | Stagehands |
| 33 | Los Angeles, California | Stagehands |
| 44 | Hollywood, California | Affiliated Property Craftpersons |
| 50 | Sacramento, California | Stagehands |
| 80 | Hollywood, California | Grips |
| 107 | Oakland, California | Stagehands |
| 119 | San Francisco, California | Broadcast |
| 122 | San Diego, California | Stagehands |
| 134 | San Jose, California | Mixed |
| 215 | Bakersfield, California | Mixed |
| 336 | Phoenix, Arizona | Mixed |
| 415 | Tucson, Arizona | Mixed |
| 442 | Santa Barbara, California | Mixed |
| 504 | Orange County, California | Mixed |
| 611 | Watsonville, California | Mixed |
| 614 | San Bernardino, California | Stagehands |
| 665 | Honolulu, Hawaii | Mixed |
| 695 | Hollywood, California | Production Sound Technicians, Television Engineers, Video Assist Technicians and Studio Projectionists |
| 705 | Hollywood, California | Costumers |
| 706 | Hollywood, California | Makeup Artists and Hairstylists Guild |
| 728 | Hollywood, California | Motion Picture Studio Electrical Lighting Technicians |
| 729 | Hollywood, California | Motion Picture Set Painters & Sign Writers |
| 748 | Phoenix, Arizona | Broadcast |
| 768 | Los Angeles, California | Theatrical Wardrobe Union |
| 784 | San Francisco, California | Theatrical Wardrobe Union |
| 795 | San Diego, California | Broadcast |
| 839 | Hollywood, California | Animation |
| 857 | Los Angeles, California | Treasurer and Ticket Sellers |
| 871 | Hollywood, California | Script Supervisors, Continuity Coordinators, Accountants & Allied Productions Specialty Guild |
| 874 | Sacramento, California | Theatrical Wardrobe |
| 884 | Hollywood, California | Motion Picture Studio Teachers and Welfare Workers |
| 892 | Hollywood, California | Costume Designers Guild |
| 905 | San Diego, California | Theatrical Wardrobe |
| 923 | Anaheim, California | Sound Figure Maintenance Technicians |
| B32 | San Jose, California | Theater Employees |
| B18 | San Francisco, California | Theater Employees |
| B192 | Hollywood, California | Amusement Area Employees |
| 363 | Reno, Nevada | Mixed |
| 720 | Las Vegas, Nevada | Mixed |

=== District 3 - Connecticut, Maine, Massachusetts, New Hampshire, Rhode Island, Vermont ===
| Local | Jurisdiction | Craft(s) |
|---|---|---|
| 11 | Boston, Massachusetts | Stagehands |
| 23 | Providence, Rhode Island | Mixed |
| 53 | Springfield, Massachusetts | Stagehands |
| 74 | Southern Connecticut | Stagehands |
| 84 | Hartford, Connecticut | Stagehands |
| 96 | Worcester, Massachusetts | Mixed |
| 114 | Portland, Maine | Stagehands |
| 195 | Lowell, Massachusetts | Mixed |
| 232 | Amherst, Massachusetts | Mixed |
| 481 | Boston, Massachusetts | Studio |
| 753 | Boston, Massachusetts | Treasurers and Tickets Sellers |
| 775 | Boston, Massachusetts | Wardrobe |
| 798 | Boston, Massachusetts | Make-Up Artists and Hairstylists |
| 919 | Burlington, Vermont | Stagehands |
| 926 | Auburn, Maine | Broadcast |
| B4 | Boston, Massachusetts | Theater Employees |

=== District 4 - Delaware, District of Columbia, Maryland, Pennsylvania, Virginia, West Virginia ===
| Local | Jurisdiction | Craft(s) |
|---|---|---|
| 3 | Pittsburgh, Pennsylvania | Stagehands |
| 8 | Philadelphia, Pennsylvania | Stagehands |
| 19 | Baltimore, Maryland | Stagehands |
| 22 | Washington, DC | Stagehands |
| 55 | Roanoke, Virginia | Mixed |
| 64 | Wheelin, West Virginia | Mixed |
| 87 | Richmond, Virginia | Stagehands |
| 97 | Reading, Hanover-Gettysburg-York County-Lancaster County, PA | Stagehands |
| 98 | Harrisburg, Pennsylvania | Stagehands |
| 181 | Baltimore, Maryland | Motion Picture Projector Operators & Video Technicians |
| 200 | Allentown, Pennsylvania | Stagehands |
| 271 | Charleston, West Virginia | Stagehands |
| 285 | Norfolk, Virginia | Stagehands |
| 487 | Baltimore, Maryland | Studio Mechanics |
| 489 | Pittsburgh, Pennsylvania | Studio Mechanics |
| 501 | Lititz, Pennsylvania | Stagehands |
| 578 | North Central, West Virginia | Stagehands |
| 636 | State College, Pennsylvania | Mixed |
| 752 | Philadelphia, Pennsylvania | Treasurers and Ticket Sellers |
| 772 | Washington, DC | Theatrical Wardrobe |
| 787 | Pittsburgh, Pennsylvania | Theatrical Wardrobe |
| 804 | Philadelphia, Pennsylvania | Broadcast |
| 819 | Washington, DC | Broadcast |
| 820 | Pittsburgh, Pennsylvania | Broadcast |
| 868 | Washington, DC | Treasurers and Ticket Sellers |
| 913 | Baltimore, Maryland | Theatrical Wardrobe |
| B868 | Washington, DC | Ticket Sales Agents |

=== District 5 - Colorado, New Mexico, Utah, Wyoming, Arkansas, Oklahoma, Texas ===
| Local | Jurisdiction | Craft(s) |
|---|---|---|
| 7 | Denver, Coloardo | Stagehands |
| 62 | Colorado Springs, Colorado | Mixed |
| 99 | Salt Lake City, Utah | Stagehands |
| 229 | Wyoming | Stagehands |
| 423 | Albuquerque, New Mexico | Mixed |
| 480 | New Mexico | Studio Mechanics |
| 719 | Arvada, Colorado | Theatrical Wardrobe |
| B7 | Denver, Colorado | |
| 51 | Houston, Texas | Stagehands |
| 76 | San Antonio, Texas | Stagehands |
| 112 | Oklahoma City, Oklahoma | Stagehands |
| 127 | Dallas, Texas | Stagehands |
| 128 | Dallas, Texas | Mixed |
| 204 | Little Rock | Mixed |
| 205 | Austin, Texas | Mixed |
| 331 | Waco, Texas | Mixed |
| 354 | Tulsa, Oklahoma | Stagehands |
| 484 | State of Texas | Studio Mechanics |
| 796 | Dallas, Houston, San Antonio, Austin, Texas | Broadcast |
| 896 | Houston, Texas | Theatrical Wardrobe |
| 904 | Tulsa, Oklahoma | Theatrical Wardrobe |

=== District 7 - Alabama, Georgia, Louisiana, Mississippi, North Carolina, South Carolina, Tennessee, Florida, Puerto Rico, US Virgin Islands ===
| Local | Jurisdiction | Craft(s) |
|---|---|---|
| 39 | New Orleans, Louisiana | Stagehands |
| 46 | Nashville, Tennessee | Stagehands |
| 60 | Pensacola, Florida | Mixed |
| 69 | Memphis, Tennessee | Stagehands |
| 78 | Birmingham, Alabama | Stagehands |
| 115 | Jacksonville, Tallahassee, Gainsville, Florida | Mixed |
| 140 | Chattanooga, Tennessee | Stagehands |
| 142 | Mobile, Alabama | Stagehands |
| 197 | Knoxville, Tennessee | Stagehands |
| 278 | Asheville, North Carolina | Mixed |
| 298 | Shreveport, Louisiana | Stagehands |
| 320 | Savannah, Georgia | Mixed |
| 321 | Tampa, Florida | Mixed |
| 333 | Charleston, Myrtle Beach, South Carolina | Mixed |
| 347 | Columbia, South Carolina | Mixed |
| 412 | Bradenton, Sarasota, Florida | Mixed |
| 477 | State of Florida | Studio Mechanics |
| 478 | State of Louisiana, Mississippi and Mobile, Alabama | Studio Mechanics |
| 479 | State of Georgia and Alabama | Studio Mechanics |
| 491 | State of North Carolina and South Carolina | Studio Mechanics |
| 492 | State of Tennessee and Northern Mississippi | Studio Mechanics |
| 494 | Puerto Rico and US Virgin Islands | Mixed |
| 500 | South Florida | Mixed |
| 574 | Greensboro, North Carolina | Mixed |
| 629 | Augusta, Georgia | Stagehands |
| 631 | Orlando, Florida | Mixed |
| 635 | Winston, Salem, North Carolina | Mixed |
| 647 | Naples, Fort Meyers, Marco Island, Florida | Stagehands |
| 699 | Johnson City, Tennessee | Mixed |
| 824 | Athens, Georgia | Mixed |
| 825 | Memphis, Tennessee | Theatrical Wardrobe |
| 834 | Atlanta, Georgia | Exhibition Employees |
| 835 | Orlando, Florida | Exhibition Employees |
| 840 | New Orleans, Louisiana | Theatrical Wardrobe |
| 900 | Huntsville, Alabama | Mixed |
| 927 | Atlanta, Georgia | Stagehands |
| AE 938 | Jacksonville, Florida | Arena Employees |

=== District 8 - Kentucky, Indiana, Michigan, Ohio ===
| Local | Jurisdiction | Craft(s) |
|---|---|---|
| 5 | Cincinnati, Ohio | Stagehands |
| 12 | Columbus, Ohio | Stagehands |
| 17 | Louisville, Kentucky | Stagehands |
| 24 | Toledo, Ohio | Stagehands |
| 26 | Grand Rapids, Michigan | Mixed |
| 27 | Cleveland, Ohio | Stagehands |
| 30 | Indianapolis, Indiana | Stagehands |
| 48 | Akron, Ohio | Stagehands |
| 49 | Terre Haute, Indiana | Stagehands |
| 101 | Youngstown, Ohio | Stagehands |
| 102 | Evansville, Indiana | Stagehands |
| 125 | Fort Wayne, Indiana | Mixed |
| 209 | Cleveland, Ohio | Studio Mechanics |
| 216 | Cleveland and Columbus, Ohio | Broadcast |
| 274 | Lansing, Michigan | Mixed |
| 317 | Indianapolis, Bloomington, West Lafayette, Indiana | Broadcast |
| 346 | Lexington, Kentucky | Mixed |
| 395 | Ann Arbor, Michigan | Mixed |
| 472 | Flint, Michigan | Motion Picture Projection Operators & Video Technicians |
| 618 | Bloomington, Indiana | Mixed |
| 747 | Columbus, Ohio | Theatrical Wardrobe |
| 757 | Detroit, Michigan | Treasurers and Ticket Sellers |
| 883 | Cleveland, Ohio | Theatrical Wardrobe |
| 886 | Dayton, Ohio | Theatrical Wardrobe |
| B38 | Cincinnati, Ohio | Theater Emoloyees |

=== District 9 - Wisconsin, Iowa, Illinois, Missouri, Minnesota, North Dakota, South Dakota, Nebraska, Kansas ===
| Local | Jurisdiction | Craft(s) |
|---|---|---|
| 2 | Chicago, Illinois | Mixed |
| 13 | Minneapolis, Minnesota | Stagecraft |
| 18 | Milwaukee, Wisconsin | Stagecraft |
| 31 | Kansas City, Missouri | Stagecraft |
| 42 | Omaha, Nebraska | Stagecraft |
| 67 | Des Moines, Iowa | Stagecraft |
| 85 | Davenport, Iowa | Stagecraft |
| 110 | Chicago, Illinois | Motion Picture Projection Operators & Video Technicians |
| 124 | Joliet, Illinois | Stagecraft |
| 138 | Springfield, Illinois | Stagecraft |
| 193 | Bloomington, Illinois | Mixed |
| 217 | Rockford, Illinois | Mixed |
| 219 | Minneapolis, Minnesota | Motion Picture Projection Operators & Video Technicians |
| 251 | Madison, Wisconsin | Mixed |
| 414 | Milwaukee, Wisconsin | Broadcast |
| 464 | Salina, Kansas | Mixed |
| 470 | Green Bay, Wisconsin | Mixed |
| 476 | Chicago, Illinois | Studio Mechanics |
| 490 | Minnesota | Studio Mechanics |
| 493 | St Louis, Missouri | Studio Mechanics |
| 690 | Iowa City, Iowa | Mixed |
| 745 | Minnesota and Iowa | Broadcast |
| 750 | Chicago, Illinois | Treasurers and Ticket Sellers |
| 762 | Chicago, Illinois | Broadcast |
| 769 | Chicago, Illinois | Theatrical Wardrobe |
| 810 | Kansas City, Missouri | Theatrical Wardrobe |

=== District 10 - New York and New Jersey ===
| Local | Jurisdiction | Craft(s) |
|---|---|---|
| 1 | New York, New York | Stagehands |
| 4 | Brooklyn and Queens, New York | Stagehands |
| 9 | Syracuse, New York | Stagehands |
| 10 | Buffalo, New York | Stagehands |
| 14 | Albany, New York | Stagehands |
| 21 | Newark, New Jersey | Stagehands |
| 25 | Rochester, New York | Stagehands |
| 52 | New York, New Jersey | Studio Mechanics |
| 59 | Jersey City, New Jersey | Stagehands |
| 77 | Atlantic City, New Jersey | Mixed |
| 100 | New York, New Jersey and Connecticut | Broadcast |
| 121 | Buffalo, New York | Mixed |
| 161 | New York | Script Supervisors, Production Coordinators, Continuity Coordinators and Productions Accountants |
| 266 | Jamestown-Chautauqua, New York | Mixed |
| 289 | Elmira, New York | Mixed |
| 306 | New York, New York | Motion Picture Projection Operators & Video Technicians |
| 536 | Red Bank-Freehold, New Jersey | Mixed |
| 632 | Northeast New Jersey | Mixed |
| 751 | New York, New York | Treasurers and Ticket Sellers |
| 764 | New York, New York | Theatrical Wardrobe |
| 794 | New York, New York | Broadcast |
| 829 | New York, New York | Exhibition Employees, Bill Posters, Billers and Distributors |
| 858 | Rochester, New York | Theatrical Wardrobe |
| 917 | Atlantic City, New Jersey | Casino Hotel Employees |
| ACT | New York, New York | Associated Craft Technicians |
| B751 | New York, New York | Mail Telephone Order Clerks |
| MAL | New York, New York | Member At Large |
| R&T | New York, New York | Radio and Television |
| 18032 | New York, New York | Association of Theatrical Press Agents & Managers |

== Canada ==
=== National Locals ===
| Local | Name | Craft(s) | Headquarters |
|---|---|---|---|
| ADC659 | Associated Designers of Canada | Scenic, Costume, Lighting, Sound, Projection (Design) | Toronto, Ontario |

=== District 11 - Ontario, Quebec, New Brunswick, Nova Scotia, Prince Edward Island, Newfoundland, Labrador ===
| Local | Jurisdiction | Craft(s) |
|---|---|---|
| 56 | Montreal, Quebec | Stagehands |
| 58 | Toronto, Ontario | Stagehands |
| 105 | London, Ontario | Mixed |
| 129 | Hamilton, Ontario | Stagehands |
| 262 | Montreal, Quebec | Operators |
| 357 | Kitchener, Ontario | Mixed |
| 411 | Province of Ontario | Production Coordinators, Craftservice Providers and Honeywagon Operators |
| 461 | St Catharines, Ontario | Mixed |
| 467 | Thunder Bay, Ontario | Mixed |
| 471 | Ottawa, Ontario | Mixed |
| 514 | Province of Quebec | Studio Mechanics |
| 523 | Quebec, Quebec | Mixed |
| 580 | Windor Ontario | Mixed |
| 634 | Sudbury and North Bay, Ontario | Mixed |
| 667 | Eastern Canada | International Cinematographers Guild |
| 671 | Province of New Foundland and Labrador | International Cinematographers Guild |
| 680 | Halifax, Nova Scotia | Mixed |
| 709 | Provine of Newfoundland and Labrador | Mixed |
| 822 | Toronto, Ontario | Theatrical Wardrobe |
| 828 | Province of Ontario | Scenic Artists & Propmakers |
| 849 | Maritime Provinces | Studio Mechanics |
| 863 | Montreal, Quebec | Theatrical Wardrobe |
| 873 | Toronto, Ontario | Studio Mechanics |
| 906 | Charlottetown, Prince Edward Island | Mixed |

=== District 12 - Manitoba, Saskatchewan, Alberta, British Columbia ===
| Local | Jurisdiction | Craft(s) |
|---|---|---|
| 63 | Winnipeg, Manitoba | Mixed |
| 118 | Vancouver, British Columbia | Stagehands |
| 168 | Vancouver Island, British Columbia | Stagehands |
| 210 | Edmonton, Alberta | Stagehands |
| 212 | Calgary, Alberta | Stagehands |
| 250 | Okanagan Valley, British Columbia | Stagehands |
| 295 | Regina-Moose Jaw, Saskatchewan | Mixed |
| 669 | Western Canada | International Cinematographers Guild |
| 856 | Province of Manitoba | Studio Mechanics |
| 891 | British Columbia, Yukon Territory | Studio Mechanics |
| 938 | British Columbia | Animation Guild & Affiliated Optical Electronic and Graphic Arts |
| B778 | British Columbia | Theater Employees |

== Locals in numerous areas, by type ==
- Mixed (locals in 132 areas)
- Motion Picture Projectionists, Operators and Video Technicians (locals in 11 areas)
- Operators (locals in 22 areas)
- Stage Employees (locals in 94 areas)
- Studio Mechanics (locals in 19 areas)
- Theatre Employees (locals in 21 areas)
- Treasurers & Ticket Sellers (locals in 11 areas)
- Television Broadcasting Studio Employees (locals in 14 areas)
- Theatrical Wardrobe Union (locals in 40 areas)
