= Marvel Studios =

American entertainment company

Marvel Studios, LLC
- Logo used since 2016

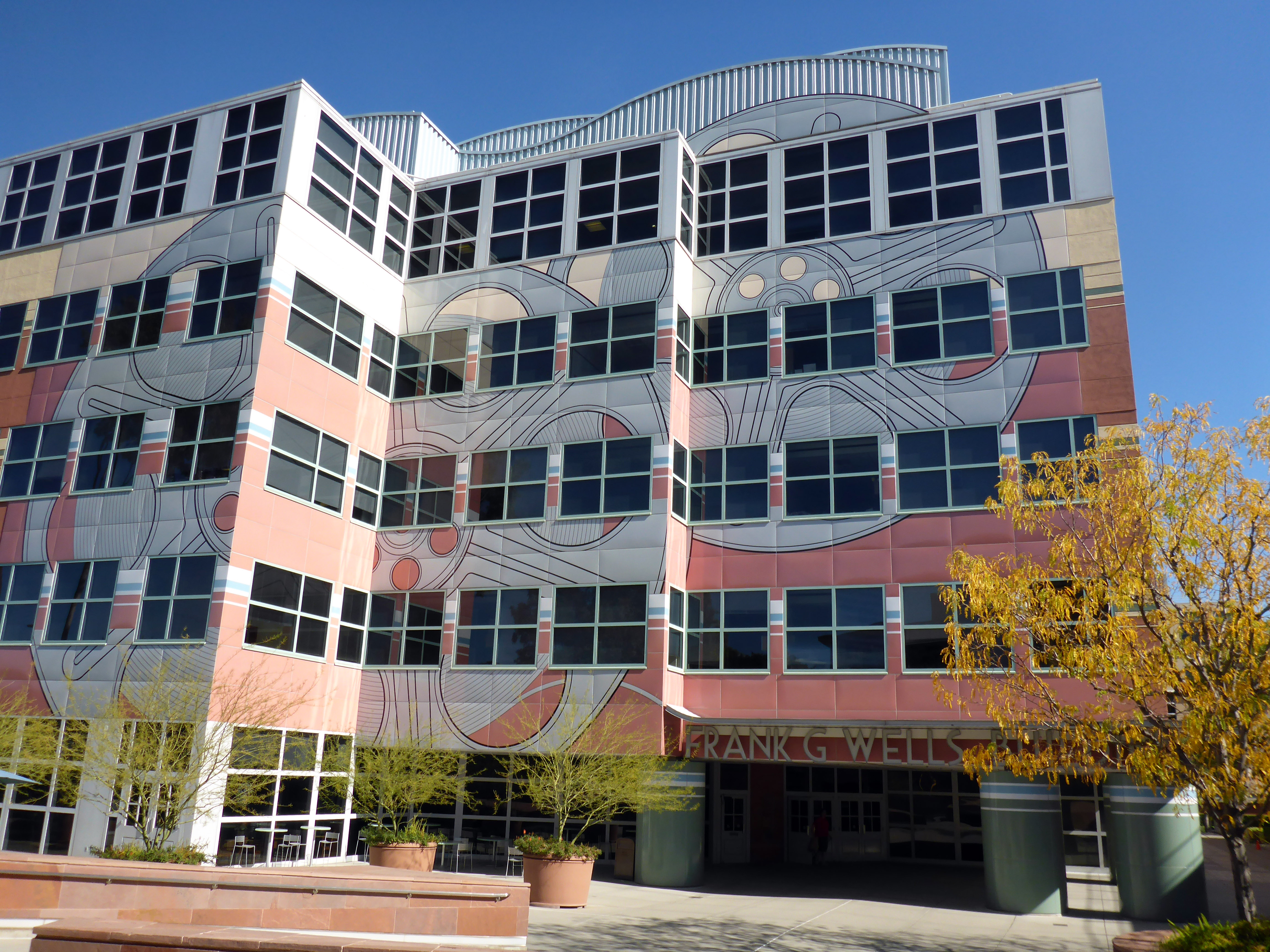
- The studio's headquarters at the Frank G. Wells Building in Burbank, California
- Formerly: Marvel Films (1993–1996)
- Type: Subsidiary
- Industry: Film; TV; animation; music
- Genre: Superhero fiction
- Founded: December 7, 1993; 32 years ago (as Marvel Films); August 7, 1996; 30 years ago (as Marvel Studios)
- Founder: Avi Arad
- Headquarters: Frank G. Wells Building, 2nd Floor, 500 South Buena Vista Street, Burbank, California, U.S.
- Area served: Worldwide
- Key people: Kevin Feige (president); Louis D'Esposito (co-president); Brad Winderbaum (head of television and animation); David Maisel (Founding Chairman)
- Products: Motion pictures; TV shows
- Brands: Marvel Cinematic Universe
- Parent: Marvel Entertainment Group (1993–1998); Marvel Entertainment (1998–2015); Walt Disney Studios (2015–present)
- Divisions: Marvel Studios Animation; Marvel Television (production label)
- Subsidiaries: Marvel Music; Marvel Animation
- Website: Official website

Marvel Studios, LLC is an American superhero film and television production company that is the creator of the Marvel Cinematic Universe (MCU), a media franchise and shared universe based on characters from Marvel Comics publications. Producer Avi Arad founded Marvel Films in December 1993 under the Marvel Entertainment Group before forming Marvel Studios in August 1996 to gain greater oversight of its adaptations. The studio originally licensed the film rights for several Marvel characters before beginning to independently produce its own films in 2004, under the direction of producer David Maisel, and it has since regained many of those rights. After Arad left in 2006 over disagreements, Kevin Feige became the primary producer and president of the studio in 2008 alongside co-president Louis D'Esposito. The Walt Disney Company acquired Marvel Entertainment, including Marvel Studios, in December 2009, and Walt Disney Studios Motion Pictures started distributing most of the studio's films with The Avengers (2012). Further disagreements between studio executives and Marvel Entertainment led to the studio's separation in August 2015 and transfer under the Walt Disney Studios. In 2018, Marvel Studios began developing its own live-action and animated television series for the streaming service Disney+, most of which share continuity with its MCU films.

Marvel Studios has released 38 MCU films from Iron Man (2008) to Spider-Man: Brand New Day (2026), as well as 18 television series from WandaVision (2021) to VisionQuest (2026). Animated television series are released under the "Marvel Animation" label and produced through its smaller Marvel Studios Animation division, starting with What If...? (2021–2024), while live-action series are released under its "Marvel Television" banner. Marvel Studios also produced eight direct-to-video short films, Marvel Animated Features (2006–2011), with the separate Marvel Animation production company as a proof of concept for the MCU devised by Maisel, in addition to five MCU One-Shot short films released from 2011 to 2014 and three Special Presentation television specials released from 2022 to 2026.

The studio's MCU films have grossed over $35 billion at the global box office, making it responsible for one of the highest-grossing media franchises and the highest-grossing film franchise of all time. Twelve of these films have grossed more than $1 billion and are among the highest-grossing films of all time, with Avengers: Endgame (2019) being the studio's highest-grossing release and the highest-grossing film ever by October 2026. Marvel Studios was involved in licensing and developing other Marvel-based multi-film franchises, including New Line Cinema's Blade trilogy (1998–2004), 20th Century Fox's X-Men franchise (2000–2020), and Sony Pictures's Spider-Man films from 2002 to 2014. Marvel Studios began co-producing its MCU Spider-Man films with Sony in 2015. Many of its post-Endgame releases underperformed critically and financially, which the studio attributed to its increased content output and began decreasing this by 2024.

From 2013 until 2020, the Marvel Entertainment division Marvel Television, led by television producer Jeph Loeb, released 12 television series that also acknowledged the MCU continuity. These were produced before that company was folded into Marvel Studios in December 2019. Marvel Studios has used different business practices by signing actors to multi-film contracts, having several studio executives oversee the production and development of select films and series as lead producers, and operating an in-house visual development department, which included full-time visual effects (VFX) workers before transitioning to using contractors following layoffs throughout Disney. Frequent producer Brad Winderbaum is the head of television and animation, while Victoria Alonso, who joined the studio in 2006, previously oversaw its physical production, post-production, VFX, and animation until 2023. Marvel Studios has consistently featured different animations of its production logo at the opening of most of its productions.

== Background ==
Marvel Comics's predecessor Timely Comics, which operated from 1939 until 1950, licensed out the use of its character Captain America to Republic Pictures for a 1944 film serial only for free advertising, but Timely failed to provide any drawing of Captain America with his shield or any further background. Republic created an entirely new backstory for the character, who was portrayed as using a gun. From the late 1970s through the early 1990s, the Marvel Comics Group and the Marvel Entertainment Group (MEG) sold options to studios to produce films based on Marvel Comics characters. Marvel optioned its superhero Spider-Man in the late 1970s, but the rights reverted to Marvel after a film was not produced within the allocated time frame. From 1986 to 1996, most of Marvel's major characters were optioned, including the Fantastic Four, X-Men, Daredevil, the Hulk, Silver Surfer, and Iron Man. Marvel's first big-screen adaptation of one of its properties was the 1986 film Howard the Duck, which was a box-office bomb. MEG was purchased by New World Entertainment in November 1986 and opted to produce films based on the Marvel characters. It released The Punisher (1989) before MEG was sold to Ronald Perelman's Andrews Group. Two other films were produced: Captain America (1990), released in the United Kingdom on screens and direct-to-video in the United States, and The Fantastic Four (1994), not intended for release.

== History ==
=== Marvel Films (1993–1996) ===
The logo used under the Marvel Films branding

After MEG acquired ToyBiz in 1993, Avi Arad of ToyBiz was named president and chief executive officer (CEO) of both the Marvel Films division and New World Family Filmworks, a New World Entertainment subsidiary. New World was MEG's former parent corporation and later a fellow subsidiary of the Andrews Group. Marvel Productions became New World Animation by 1993 while Marvel formed Marvel Films as its dedicated production division, which included Marvel Films Animation. Marvel Films Animation shared Tom Tataranowicz with New World Animation as head of development and production. New World Animation, Saban, and Marvel Films Animation each produced a Marvel series for television for the 1996–1997 season: The Incredible Hulk, X-Men: The Animated Series, and Spider-Man: The Animated Series, respectively. By the end of 1993, Arad and 20th Century Fox signed a deal to develop a film based on the X-Men. In August 1996, New World Animation and Marvel Films Animation were sold along with the rest of New World by the Andrews Group to News Corporation and the Fox Entertainment Group. As part of the deal, Marvel licensed the rights for Captain America, Daredevil, and Silver Surfer to the Fox Kids Network for series that Saban would produce, while New World Animation continued producing a second season of The Incredible Hulk for UPN.

=== Formation of Marvel Studios and licensing films (1996–2004) ===
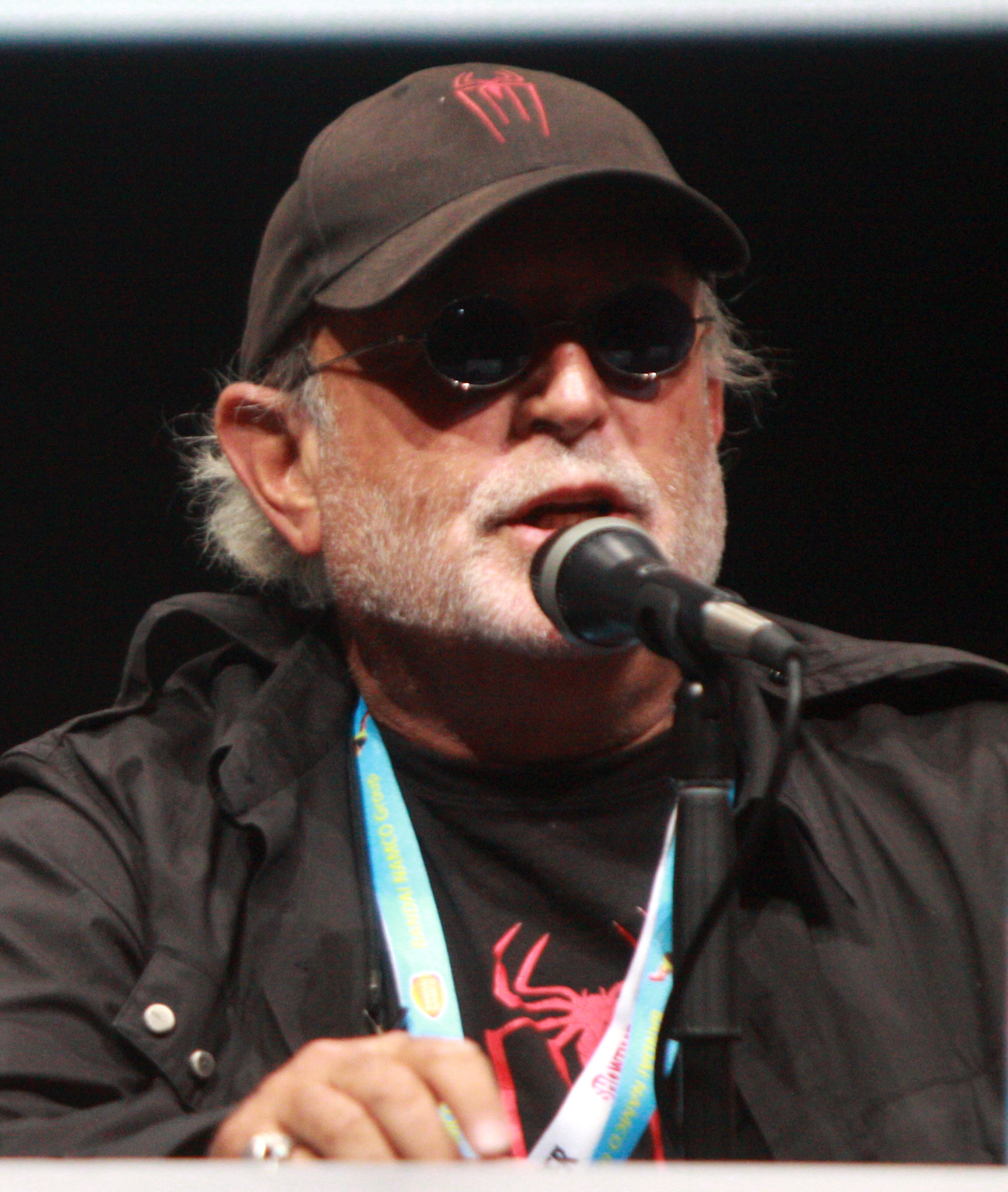
Avi Arad, the founder of Marvel Studios

The Marvel Entertainment Group formed Marvel Studios on August 7, 1996. Filing with the U.S. Securities and Exchange Commission to raise money to finance the new corporation, Marvel, Isaac Perlmutter's Zib, Inc., and Avi Arad sold ToyBiz stock. ToyBiz filed an offering of 7.5 million shares with a closing price of $20.125 at the time, making the offering worth approximately $150 million. ToyBiz sought to sell 1 million shares. Jerry Calabrese, the president of Marvel Entertainment Group, and Avi Arad, head of Marvel Films and a director of ToyBiz, were assigned tandem control of Marvel Studios. Under Calabrese and Arad, Marvel sought to control pre-production by commissioning scripts, hiring directors, and casting characters, providing the package to a major studio partner for filming and distribution. Arad said of the goal for control, "When you get into business with a big studio, they are developing a hundred or 500 projects; you get totally lost. That isn't working for us. We're just not going to do it anymore." Marvel Studios arranged a seven-year development deal with 20th Century Fox to cover markets in the United States and internationally.

In December 1996, MEG underwent a Chapter 11 bankruptcy reorganization plan, including Marvel Studios as part of its strategic investment, and MEG subsequently merged with ToyBiz to form Marvel Enterprises in June 1998. By 1997, Marvel Studios was actively pursuing various film productions based on Marvel characters, including the eventual films X-Men (2000), Daredevil (2003), Elektra (2005), and Fantastic Four (2005). Unproduced projects included Prince Namor, based on the character Namor and to be directed by Philip Kaufman, and Mort the Dead Teenager, based on the comic book of the same name and written by John Payson and Mort creator Larry Hama. Marvel's Captain America animated series with Saban Entertainment for Fox Kids Network was set to premiere in late 1998. However, due to the bankruptcy, the series was canceled after the character designs and a one-minute promotional reel were produced.

The first film Marvel Studios packaged and licensed was Blade (1998) for New Line Cinema, based on the vampire hunter Blade. Stephen Norrington directed the film, with Wesley Snipes starring as Blade. Blade was released on August 21, 1998, grossing $131.2 million worldwide, and was followed by X-Men, directed by Bryan Singer. That film was released on July 14, 2000, and grossed $296.3 million worldwide. Blade and X-Men demonstrated that widely popular films could be made out of comic book characters not familiar to the general public, with each spawning their own respective media franchises, New Line's Blade trilogy and Fox's wider X-Men franchise, with multiple sequels and some television spin-offs. Leading up to X-Men's release, Marvel Studios negotiated a deal with then-functional Artisan Entertainment, successful with the low-budget The Blair Witch Project, for a co-production joint venture that included rights to 15 Marvel characters including Captain America; Thor, as a television series; Black Panther, with Snipes attached to produce and star; Deadpool; Iron Fist; Morbius, the Living Vampire; Longshot; Power Pack; Mort the Dead Teenager; Ant-Man, and the Punisher. Artisan would finance and distribute while Marvel would develop licensing and merchandising tie-ins. The resulting production library would be co-owned and include television series, direct-to-video films, and internet projects. By March 2001, Marvel Studios planned to produce multiple animated spin-off series for its approximately 20 films in development at the time. The studio was also preparing live-action series for broadcast syndication to be released in 2002, particularly adaptations of the Daughters of the Dragon team and the Spider-Man adversary Black Cat, with the intention for Tribune Entertainment to distribute the series after previously doing so for the studio's first live-action syndicated series, Mutant X (2001–2004), which was not based on Marvel Comics. By the end of 2001, the success of Marvel Entertainment's Ultimate Marvel imprint comics created leverage in Hollywood for Marvel Studios, pushing more properties into development.

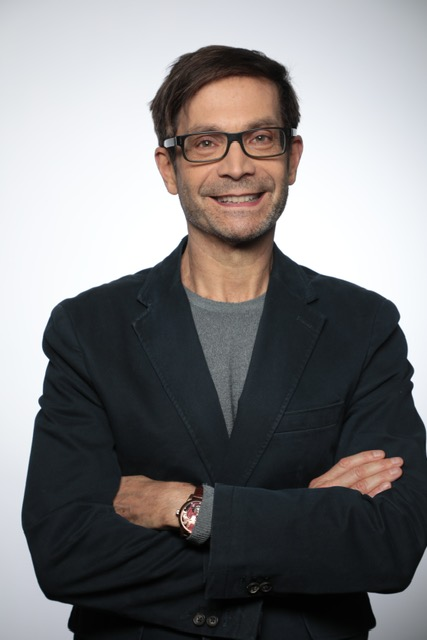
David Maisel conceived a plan for Marvel to finance its own films and became the president of Marvel Studios in 2004.

The next film licensed from Marvel Studios was Columbia Pictures' Spider-Man, released on May 3, 2002. Directed by Sam Raimi and starring Tobey Maguire as Spider-Man, it grossed $821.7 million worldwide. The early success of Spider-Man led the film's studio to issue a seven-figure advance for a sequel. Arad spoke of the deal, "Movies make sequels. Therefore, it's a big economic luxury to know that a movie's going to get a second and third. This is a business of precedence." According to a Lehman Brothers analysis, Marvel Studios made only $62 million for the first two Spider-Man films. Marvel earned more from half the consumer product licensing fees than from the films, but it was enough for Marvel to regain its financial footing. In October 2002, Marvel Studios announced deals for the Sub-Mariner and Prime with Universal Pictures.

In contrast to the original storylines of DC Comics' Superman and Batman films, Marvel films often emphasized more fidelity to its comics, applying set pieces, scenes, plots, and dialogue drawn from them. In 2003, David Maisel approached Arad about earning Marvel more for its films. Maisel, Arad, and Perlmutter met, leading to Maisel's hiring as president and chief operating officer (COO). At this point, the studio operated out of a small office on Santa Monica Boulevard, with around a dozen staff members. Kevin Feige, who later became the president of Marvel Studios, was then a junior executive generating script notes for the licensed studios. In January 2003, Marvel, the Sci-Fi Channel, and Reveille Productions agreed to develop two pilot films based on Brother Voodoo and Strikeforce: Morituri. In December 2003, Lionsgate purchased Artisan Entertainment and decided to let all of the character rights Artisan held, except the Punisher, revert to Marvel. Marvel Studios partnered with Lionsgate in 2004 to produce eight animated films, called Marvel Animated Features, for the direct-to-DVD market with Lionsgate Home Entertainment handling distribution. The line was a proof of concept for Maisel's later plan. Eric Rollman was hired by Marvel as Executive Vice President of home entertainment and TV production for Marvel Studios to oversee the deal with Lionsgate.

=== Transition to independent film production (2004–2009) ===
Maisel was hired in 2004 as president and chief operating officer of Marvel Studios, as he had a plan for the studio to self-finance its films. Marvel entered into a non-recourse debt structure with Merrill Lynch that was collateralized by certain film rights to a total of ten characters from Marvel's vast vault. Marvel received $525 million to produce a maximum of ten films based on the company's properties over eight years, according to the parameters of the original deal. Those characters were Ant-Man, the Avengers, Black Panther, Captain America, Cloak & Dagger, Doctor Strange, Hawkeye, Nick Fury, Power Pack, and Shang-Chi. Ambac insured the films would succeed, or it would pay the interest payment on the debt and get the film rights as collateral. Initially, Marvel Studios was in talks with Universal Pictures as a possible distributor, because Universal owned the film rights to both the Hulk and Namor during that time. Negotiations dragged on, so the studio began talks with Paramount Pictures. In the second quarter of 2005, Merrill attempted to back out of full financing of each film, demanding that Marvel finance one-third of the budget. To meet that demand, Marvel reclaimed rights in five foreign territories from Paramount for pre-sale. In September 2005, Marvel announced the Merrill Lynch financing deal with Paramount as marketer and distributor. Marvel Studios's parent company, Marvel Enterprises, Inc., then changed its name to Marvel Entertainment, Inc. to reflect the change to self-production. This made Marvel Studios Hollywood's first major independent film studio since DreamWorks Pictures was founded in 1994.

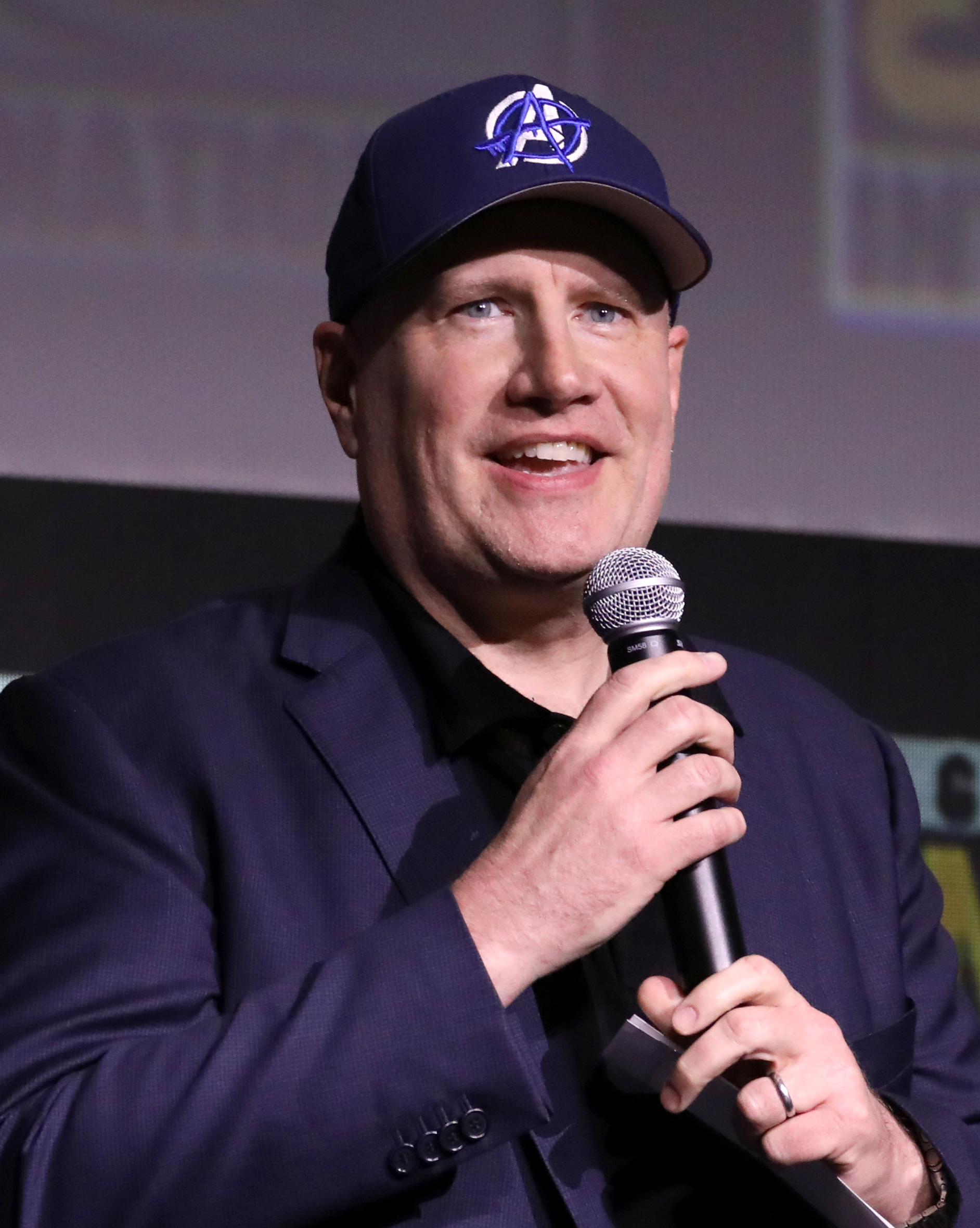
Kevin Feige has been the primary producer at Marvel Studios since 2007 and became its president a year later.

The studio subsequently relocated to a new location above a Mercedes-Benz dealership in Beverly Hills, California. Maisel was also named vice-chairman of the studio, but reported to Perlmutter, who had become the CEO of Marvel Entertainment. In November 2005, Michael Helfant joined the studio as president and chief operating officer. Also that month, Marvel gained the film rights to Iron Man from New Line Cinema. Marvel then revealed that it had regained the film rights to the Hulk from Universal in February 2006, in exchange for letting Universal own the distribution rights to The Incredible Hulk (2008) and the right of first refusal to pick up the distribution rights to any future Marvel Studios-produced Hulk films. In April 2006, Thor was announced to be a Marvel Studios production, while Lions Gate Entertainment subsequently dropped the Black Widow film it had in development since 2004 and returned the rights to Marvel. Feige, a self-described "fanboy" who had become Arad's second-in-command, subsequently realized that Marvel owned the rights to the Avengers team. He envisioned introducing each of the Avengers in individual films and then merging them in a crossover film as part of a shared universe, similar to the one that was created by Stan Lee and Jack Kirby for Marvel Comics in the 1960s.

Maisel and Arad fought over the rate of film releases and the strength of characters in the film lineup. Perlmutter supported Maisel, and thus, in May 2006, Arad resigned as studio chair and CEO. He doubted the shared universe strategy would work, but insisted that his reputation helped secure the initial financing. In March 2007, Helfant was "forced out" of the studio while Maisel was named chairman and Feige was named president of production to replace Helfant as Iron Man (2008) began filming. To preserve its artistic integrity, Marvel Studios formed a creative committee of six people familiar with its comic book lore: Feige, Marvel Studios co-president Louis D'Esposito, Marvel Comics' president of publishing Dan Buckley, Marvel Entertainment's chief creative officer (CCO) Joe Quesada, comic book writer Brian Michael Bendis, and Marvel Entertainment president Alan Fine, who oversaw the committee as its chairman. In January 2008, Marvel Animation was incorporated to direct Marvel's efforts in animation and home entertainment markets, including then-animation efforts with Lionsgate and Nickelodeon. In March, the company agreed to a five-picture basic cable distribution with FX for the films Iron Man and The Incredible Hulk, with additional films to be named later. Following the successful opening weekend of Iron Man in May 2008, Maisel had his contract extended through 2010 and Feige was promoted to president of Marvel Studios. In November, Marvel Studios signed a lease with Raleigh Studios to host its headquarters and production offices and film the next four films on the studios' slate, including Iron Man 2 (2010) and Thor (2011), at its Manhattan Beach Studios Media Campus facilities. By September 2008, Paramount added five additional Marvel films' foreign distribution to its domestic film distribution contract. Before D'Esposito's promotion in November 2009 to co-president with Feige, he was the studio's president of physical production and oversaw its budgets and production schedule. D'Esposito would report to Perlmutter as well as to Fine alongside Feige.

In 2009, producer Stephen Broussard was tasked with forming the studio's writers program. The writers were hired for a year to be on call to do emergency script polishes for films in production, as well as developing scripts based on some lesser-known properties, such as Black Panther, Cable, Iron Fist, Nighthawk, and Vision. Writers included: Edward Ricourt, who was encouraged to write a script for Luke Cage as it was of high interest to the studio; Nicole Perlman, who chose to write a script based on the 2008 Guardians of the Galaxy team; Christopher Yost, who was asked to pitch a Black Panther film for his interview, and took interest in writing scripts about the Thunderbolts, Power Pack, and Brian Braddock / Captain Britain; Joe Robert Cole, who initially pitched a War Machine film before joining the writers program where he created scripts for the Inhumans; and Eric Pearson, who was asked to pitch a Cloak and Dagger film and also worked to rewrite a Luke Cage script. After Broussard moved on to the production of Captain America: The First Avenger (2011), Marvel Studios hired Nate Moore to oversee the writers program, who at times was assisted by the also newly hired executive Jodi Hildebrand. Feige was particularly interested in screenplays for Black Panther, Iron Fist, and Blade. The program shut down in 2014 but was revived in 2016. In early 2009, Sony returned what at the time was thought to have been all Spider-Man television rights, including live-action, in exchange for an adjustment to the film rights; it was later clarified to have applied only to the animated television rights when episodes are shorter than 44 minutes.

=== Disney conglomerate subsidiary (since 2009) ===
==== Acquisition by Disney and immediate changes (2009–2015) ====
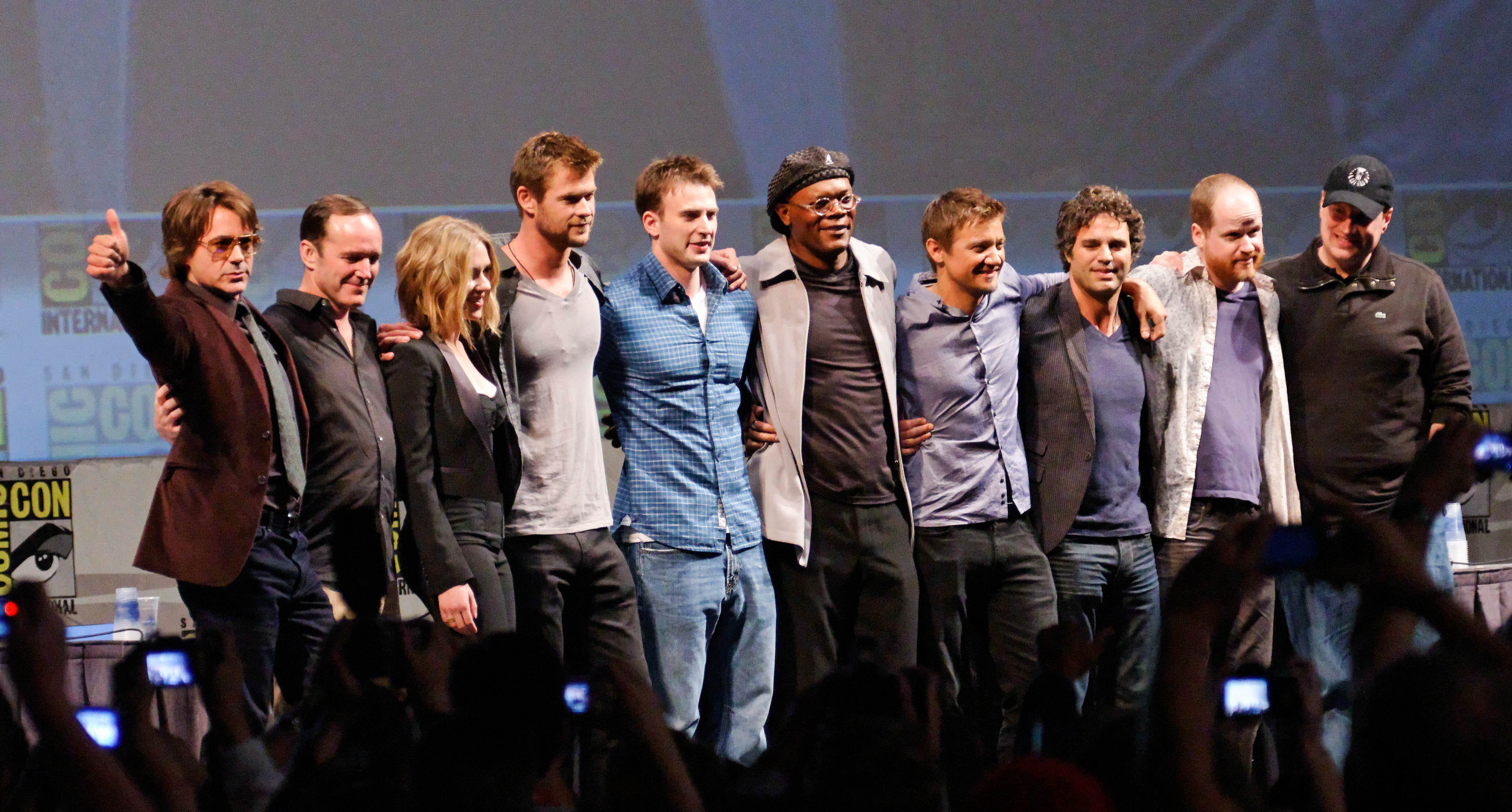
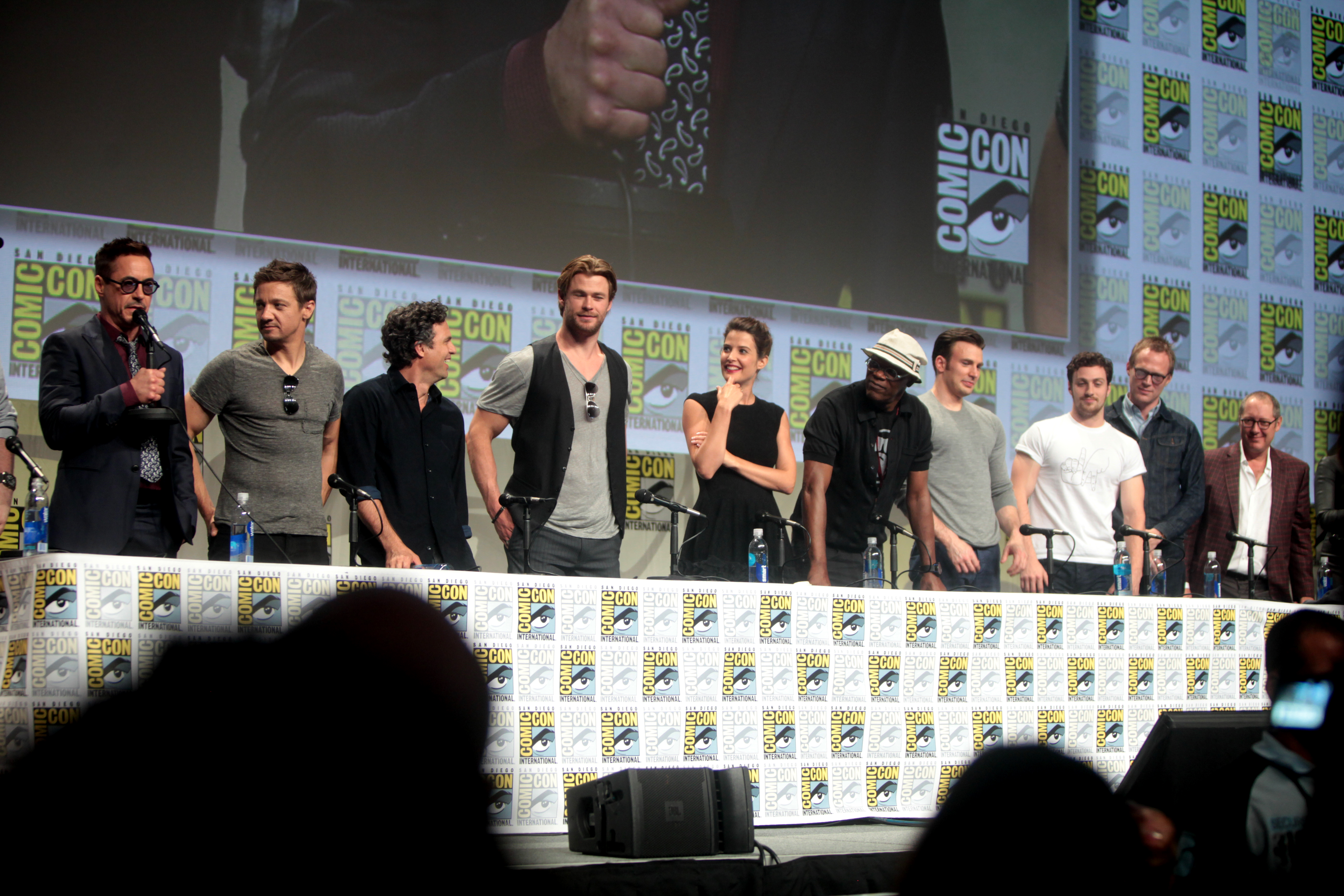
The cast of The Avengers and Avengers: Age of Ultron promoting the films at San Diego Comic-Con

On August 31, 2009, the Walt Disney Company announced that it had reached a deal to acquire Marvel Entertainment for $4 billion. The deal was completed on December 31, with Marvel Entertainment becoming a subsidiary of Disney. Both Marvel and Disney stated that the merger would not affect any pre-existing deals with other film studios for the time being, although Disney said it would distribute future Marvel projects with its own studio once the deals expired. Maisel stepped down from the studio following the sale to Disney. In April 2010, rumors circulated that Marvel was looking to create $20–40 million films based on properties such as Doctor Strange, Ka-Zar, Luke Cage, Dazzler, and Power Pack. Feige responded by saying, while budgets are generally never discussed early in development, Marvel was considering films for all characters mentioned in the rumor, except Dazzler, whose rights were at Fox.

In June 2010, Marvel Entertainment established a television division within Marvel Studios called Marvel Television, led by producer Jeph Loeb, under which Marvel Animation would operate. In October, Walt Disney Studios Motion Pictures acquired the distribution rights for The Avengers (2012) and Iron Man 3 (2013) from Paramount Pictures, with Paramount's logo and billing remaining on those films. In August 2011, at Disney's behest, the studio dismissed most of its marketing department, including EVP of Worldwide Marketing Dana Precious, VP of Worldwide Marketing Jeffrey Stewart, and Manager of Worldwide Marketing Jodi Miller. Disney subsequently began marketing Marvel's films. In April 2012, the Walt Disney Company China, Marvel Studios, and DMG Entertainment announced an agreement to co-produce Iron Man 3 in China. DMG co-financed and handled co-production matters in China, where it co-distributed the film.

Shortly after its May 2012 release, The Avengers became the studio's first film and the first Marvel production to gross over $1 billion worldwide. In April 2013, Marvel Studios moved its executive production offices from the Manhattan Beach Studios Media Campus to the Walt Disney Studios in Burbank, California. In July 2013, Disney purchased the distribution rights to Iron Man, Iron Man 2, Thor, and Captain America: The First Avenger from Paramount. In September 2014, TNT acquired the cable rights for Avengers: Age of Ultron (2015), Captain America: Civil War (2016), and three other films, to air on the network two years after their theatrical releases. FX had previously aired the films since 2008. Marvel Studios announced its Phase Three (2016–2019) films at a special press event in October 2014, which drew comparisons to Apple's Worldwide Developers Conference. In February 2015, Marvel Studios and Sony Pictures announced they would co-produce a new Spider-Man reboot film, Spider-Man: Homecoming (2017), and integrate the character into the MCU. Sony Pictures would continue to finance, distribute, own, and have final creative control of the Spider-Man films.

==== Restructuring under Walt Disney Studios and expansion to television and animation (2015–2023) ====
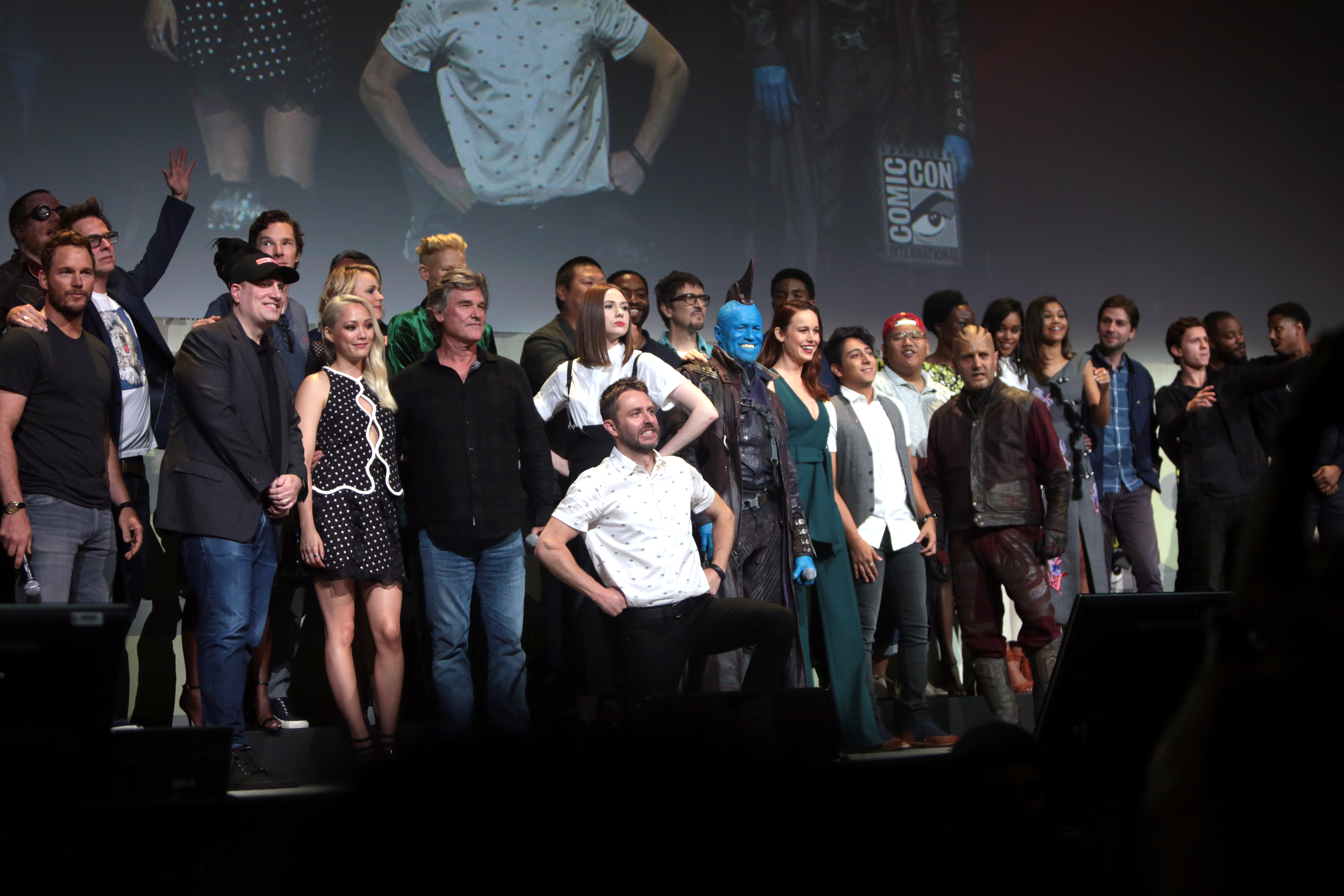
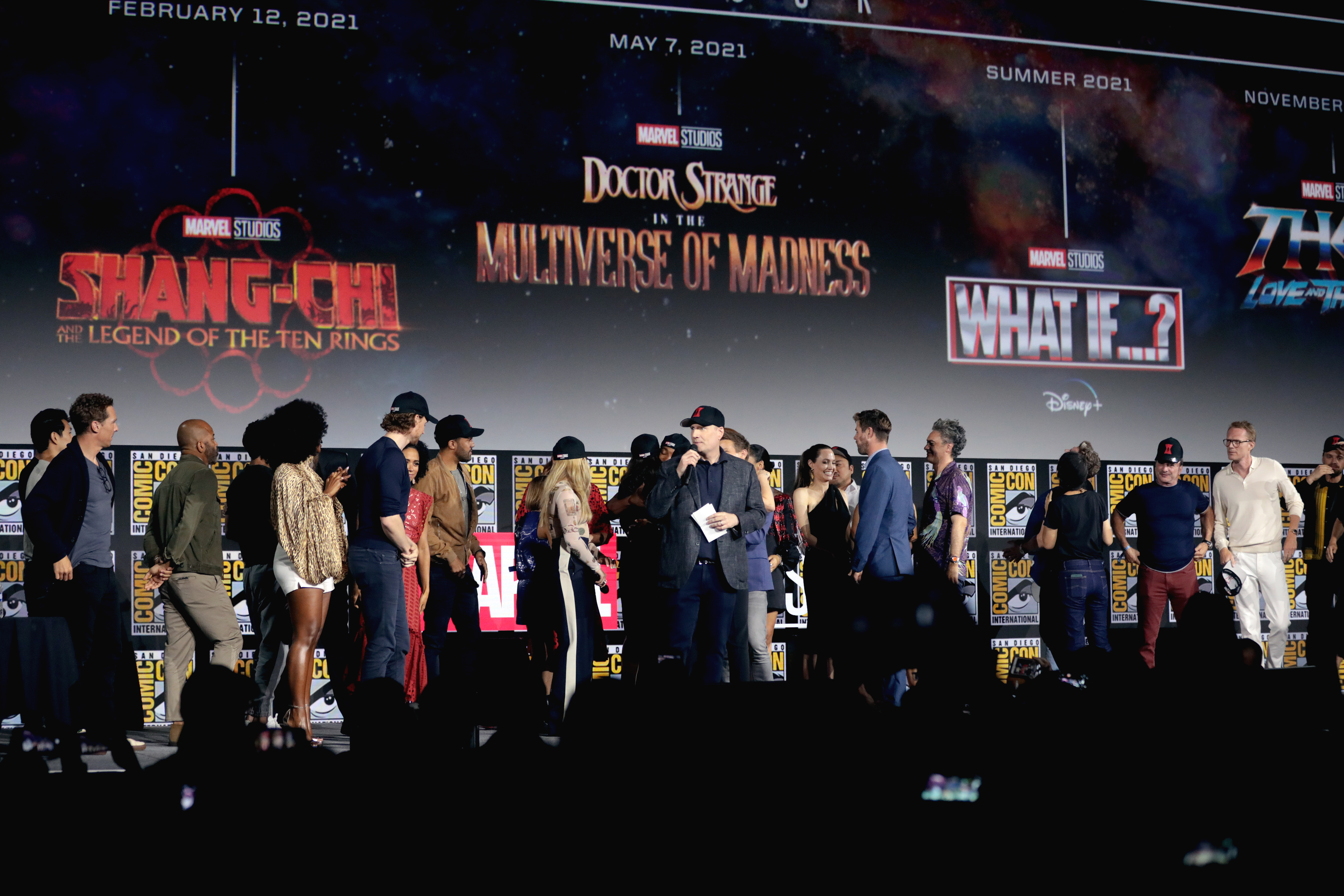
Multiple MCU film actors and directors promoting their work at Marvel Studios' San Diego Comic-Con panels

In August 2015, Marvel Studios was placed into Walt Disney Studios, with Feige reporting directly to Walt Disney Studios chairman Alan F. Horn instead of Perlmutter. Marvel Television and its subsidiary Marvel Animation were left under Marvel Entertainment and Perlmutter's control, and the creative committee began having only "nominal" input on the films while continuing to consult on Marvel Television productions. All key film decisions moving forward were to be made by Feige, D'Esposito, and executive vice president of film production Victoria Alonso. The studio went on to establish the Marvel Studios Parliament, a "brain trust" of long-time executives at the company who help to elevate each other's projects where possible. By April 2017, Marvel Studios was housed on the second floor of the Frank G. Wells Building at the Disney studio lot. Fast Company ranked Marvel Studios number eleven on its 2018 World's Most Innovative Companies list. In June 2018, the studio's film Avengers: Infinity War became the first superhero film to earn over $2 billion at the box office. Its sequel Avengers: Endgame subsequently surpassed it, grossing nearly $2.8 billion and becoming the highest-grossing film of all time worldwide in July 2019, overtaking Avatar (2009) until it surpassed Endgame in March 2021. Endgame culminated the MCU's 22-film story up to that point. In March 2019, the rights to the X-Men and Fantastic Four characters, and Deadpool were returned to Marvel Studios following Disney's acquisition of 20th Century Fox's owner, 21st Century Fox. Despite this, Feige said the studio could not yet immediately integrate these characters and concepts into the MCU because of corporate acquisition laws.

By September 2018, Marvel Studios was developing several limited series for the streaming service Disney+, centered on supporting characters from the MCU films that did not have their own films and were unlikely to. The series were expected to feature the MCU actors reprising their roles and be six to eight episodes, with a "hefty [budget] rivaling those of a major studio production". Marvel Studios would produce these series rather than Marvel Television, with Feige taking a "hands-on role" in each series' development. In July 2019, Feige announced the Phase Four (2021–2022) slate of films and series at San Diego Comic-Con (SDCC). In October 2019, Feige was given the title of chief creative officer (CCO) at Marvel, and would oversee the creative direction of Marvel Television and Marvel Animation (internally known as Marvel Family Entertainment), with both being returned to being under the Marvel Studios banner. Two months later, Marvel Television was folded into Marvel Studios, with Marvel Studios overseeing development of all the Marvel Television series in production at the time of its closing. Karim Zreik, Marvel Television's senior vice president of current programming and production, would join Marvel Studios alongside his team to oversee the production of the Marvel Television series inherited by Marvel Studios.

In June 2021, ahead of Marvel Studios's first solely produced animated series What If...?, Alonso noted that the studio was creating an "animation branch and mini-studio" to focus on more animated content beyond What If...?. The animation branch of Marvel Studios and "mini-studio" is known as Marvel Studios Animation. Marvel Studios outsources the animation for its animated series to third-party animation studios, though executive Brad Winderbaum indicated Marvel would work with fellow Disney studios Pixar and Walt Disney Animation Studios "under the right circumstances". In September 2021, Alonso was promoted to president of physical production, post-production, VFX, and animation. In November 2021, Marvel Studios announced the animated series X-Men '97 (2024–present), a revival of X-Men: The Animated Series (1992–1997) that is set in that series' continuity. By April 2022, Marvel Studios had taken over production of the preschool animated series Spidey and His Amazing Friends, starting from its second season; the first season was produced under the Marvel Entertainment banner.

In April 2022, Feige said he and Marvel Studios were on a creative retreat to plan and discuss the MCU films for the following 10 years. In May 2022, Marvel Studios signed a 20-year licensing deal with Stan Lee Universe to license the name and likeness of Lee for use in future films, television series, Disney theme parks and cruises, various "experiences", and merchandising. Lee was not expected to be digitally recreated to make cameo appearances in future projects; instead, the deal allowed Marvel to use Lee's name, voice, likeness, signature, and existing images and archival material. Following comments that there was no clear plan for the franchise in Phase Four compared to the Infinity Saga, which encompassed the films of Phases One (2008–2012), Two (2013–2015), and Three, Feige announced at SDCC in July 2022 that Phases Four, Five (2023–2025), and Six (2025–2027) would collectively be known as "The Multiverse Saga", and would culminate in the films Avengers: The Kang Dynasty and Avengers: Secret Wars (2027). Marvel Studios decided to not have an Avengers crossover film in each phase due to the large expansion in the number of MCU projects in a short amount of time, and after the "creative experience" of ending the Infinity Saga with Infinity War and Endgame. The studio chose to focus on actor Jonathan Majors's character Kang the Conqueror as an overarching antagonist of the Multiverse Saga after seeing his performance in the first season of the Disney+ series Loki (2021) and the film Ant-Man and the Wasp: Quantumania (2023).

==== Overhaul of film and television output and structural changes (since 2023) ====
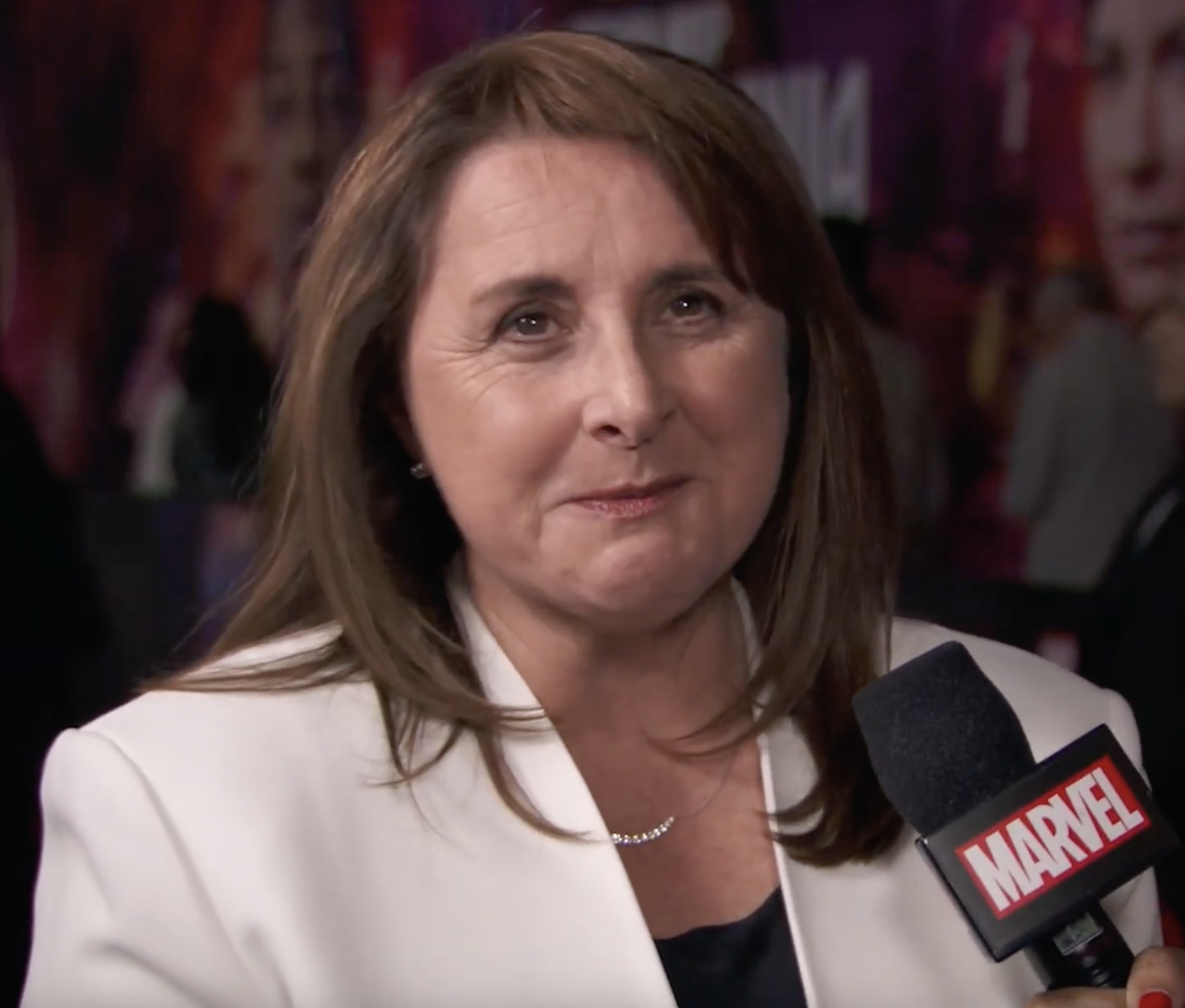
Victoria Alonso was the president of physical and post-production, VFX, and animation until her firing in 2023.

Marvel Entertainment was dissolved in March 2023, when Perlmutter was let go as part of wider lay-offs throughout Disney, with that company's remaining units being folded into Disney's other divisions. Also that month, Alonso was fired from her role at Marvel Studios by a group including Disney Entertainment co-chairman Alan Bergman and Disney's human resources and legal departments for serving as a producer on the Amazon Studios film Argentina, 1985 (2022); this was a breach of a 2018 agreement between Alonso and Disney which stated employees would not work for a competing studio. Alonso reportedly did not seek permission to work on the film and was asked by Disney to stop working on it, as well as not to promote or publicize it, with the situation "deemed serious enough" that Disney requested a new agreement be signed. Despite this, Alonso continued to promote the film following its September 2022 premiere. She was consistently reminded of her agreement and breach of contract, ultimately leading to her firing. Alonso's lawyers refuted this claim, stating Disney was aware of, and agreed to, Alonso's work on Argentina, 1985, and that she was instead "silenced[... and] was terminated when she refused to do something she believed was reprehensible"; this incident was reported to be a disagreement with a Disney executive over the censoring of gay pride elements in Quantumania to release the film in Kuwait and comply with its restrictive anti-LGBTQ laws. A Disney spokesperson reiterated the notion that she was fired due to "an indisputable breach of contract and a direct violation of company policy" among other "key factors". Disney and Alonso reached a multimillion-dollar compensation settlement in April. After Alonso's firing, visual effects vendors for the various MCU projects worked with producer Jen Underdahl, vice president of visual effects and stereo. In June 2023, the distribution rights to The Incredible Hulk reverted from Universal back to Marvel and Disney.

In July 2023, Disney CEO Bob Iger said the company would be reducing the amount of content from Marvel Studios following several films underperforming at the box office, admitting that the expansion into Disney+ series and more films had "diluted focus and attention". He clarified in May 2024 that Disney would now release two, or at most three, Marvel films and two Marvel series a year. This was a decrease from up to four films and around four series in some recent years. The company was reducing output and focusing on quality across all its divisions, but Iger felt the change was especially needed for Marvel. Feige and D'Esposito said 2023 had been a particularly difficult year for the studio, but they had learned their lesson on trying to make too much content at once. They said that no longer being "on top" of the box office allowed them to be underdogs again, as they were when they began work on Phase One, and they would be "coming back strong" with the hope of exceeding expectations. Feige added that the three films that were still scheduled for 2025—Captain America: Brave New World, Thunderbolts*, and The Fantastic Four: First Steps—had been in development for a long time and were ready for release. He expected Marvel Studios to start releasing two films a year from 2026, but said one to three films could be released during some years. In May 2025, Iger called Thunderbolts* the "first and best example" of Marvel Studios' refocusing efforts. By that July, Feige said he had approximately "two years, a little less" left on his contract. Further changes to Marvel Studios' release slate resulted in over a year gap between First Steps and Spider-Man: Brand New Day (2026); this would be the longest gap between MCU film releases since the gap between Spider-Man: Far From Home (2019) and Black Widow (2021), which was impacted by the COVID-19 pandemic.

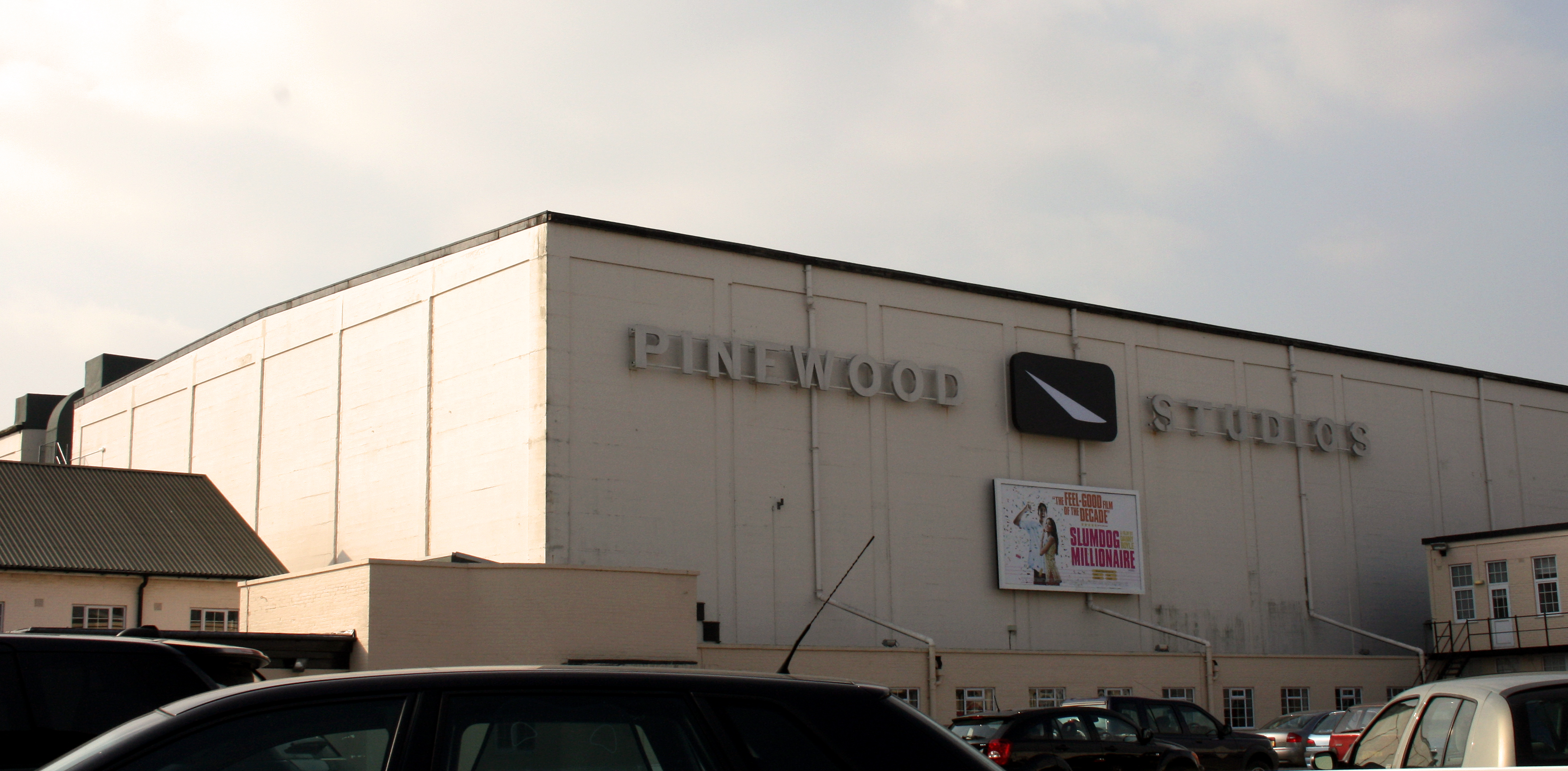
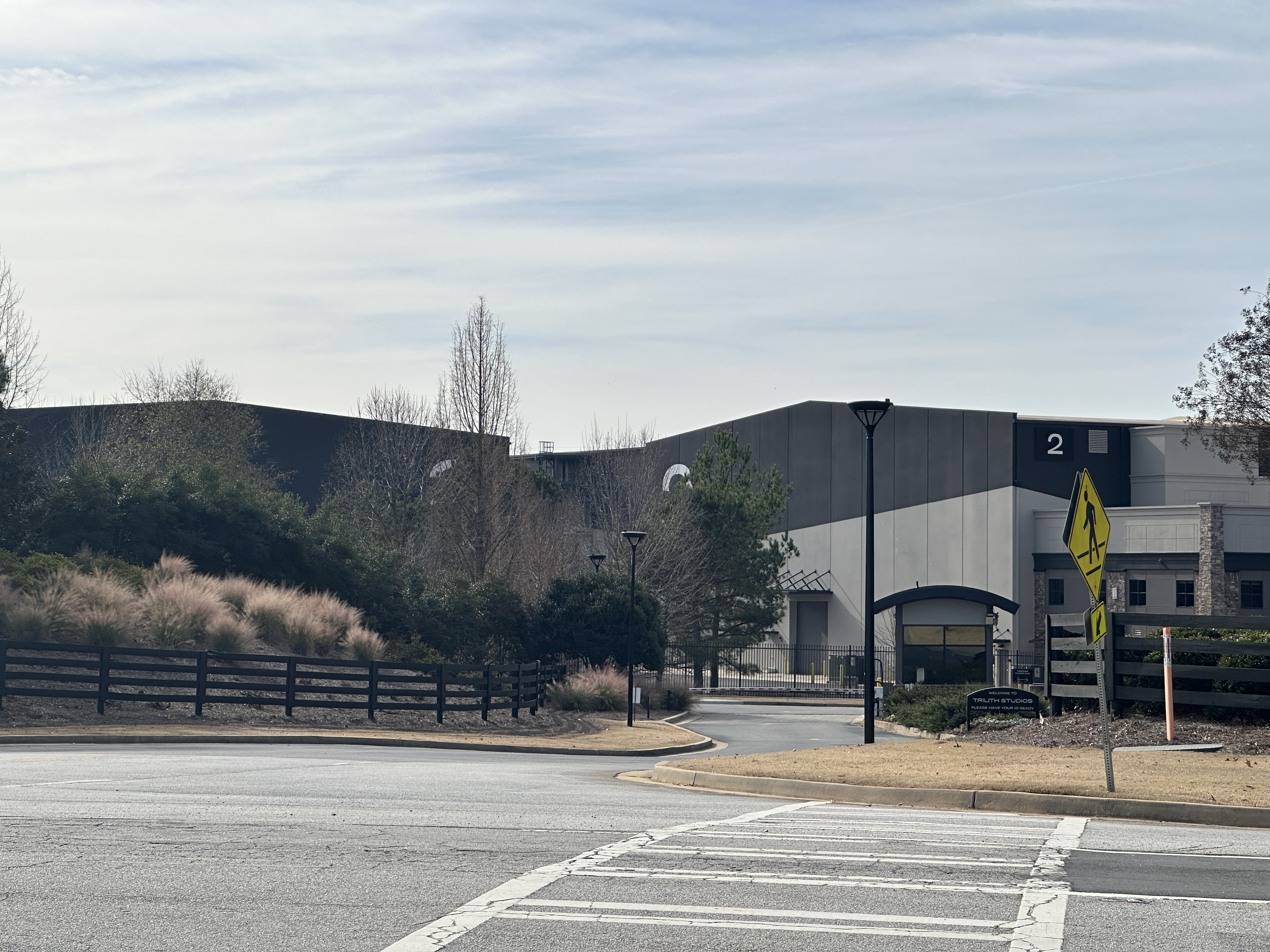
Marvel Studios has used sound stages on the complexes at Trilith Studios in Fayetteville, Georgia, and Pinewood Studios in Buckinghamshire, England, for many of its productions.

Following several critical and financial failures, the studio began testing its films through test screenings organized by the National Research Group (NRG). The studio previously relied on "friends-and-family" test screenings at the Walt Disney Studios Burbank lot to help maintain secrecy. Feige said the NRG tests yielded results similar to their own. In July, Feige said the studio was working to reduce its film budgets, which had increased since Endgame in part due to the pandemic. He said the budgets for their 2024 and 2025 films were a third lower than those for 2022 and 2023. Marvel Studios executives met with the creative team behind the film The Creator (2023) to understand how it was produced on a relatively low $80 million budget. Additionally, Feige said Marvel Studios had made a deal to film many of its then-upcoming films at Pinewood Studios in the United Kingdom, where several of their other films had previously been shot. He said Marvel Studios anticipated using studio space in Georgia and New York, rather than California, because of those states' production tax credits. However, The Wall Street Journal reported that Marvel would largely forego shooting in Georgia because of rising costs, instead choosing to shoot in the United Kingdom because it had become cheaper. Marvel Studios had previously shot 13 of its films and multiple television series at Trilith Studios in Fayetteville, Georgia, due to its sound stages and that state's tax credit system, investing over $3 billion in the state.

In August 2023, a group of 52 on-set VFX workers at Marvel Studios filed a petition with the National Labor Relations Board for an election to join the International Alliance of Theatrical Stage Employees (IATSE) labor union branch, the VFX Union. This was the first time any workers in the visual effects industry had petitioned for union recognition. Chris Lee at Vulture believed that if this group of workers secured union recognition, it "would stand as proof of concept for the overall viability of an industry-wide unionization push", particularly at the post-production effects houses. This came after several VFX workers had raised complaints of Marvel's "demanding post-production schedules" and a "toxic work environment". All of the workers who participated in the election vote that concluded in early September voted unanimously to form a union with IATSE, with the union then set to enter into collective bargaining negotiations with Marvel, beginning at an unspecified date. A four-year union contract between the studio and the VFX workers was ratified in May 2025, which frequent Marvel VFX data wrangler Cael Liakos-Gilbert called "a much-needed win for the entire VFX industry".

By October 2023, Marvel Studios was planning to hire dedicated executives to focus on its television efforts, as part of a larger plan to change its approach to its television series, which were developed similar to the studio's films as multi-hour-long event television miniseries overseen by head writers and subsequently by lead directors rather than hiring traditional showrunners. Production and development executive Richie Palmer was serving as a television executive by January 2024. In May 2024, Marvel Studios revealed that its live-action Disney+ series would be released under a new "Marvel Television" banner, separate from the previous company of the same name, starting with Agatha All Along later in 2024. Marvel Studios Animation projects were also using the "Marvel Animation" name and banner by then. These were established to inform audiences that they were not required to watch every studio project to understand the overall story and could choose which storylines and characters to follow.

After Majors was found guilty of assault and harassment amidst legal issues in December 2023, he was fired by Disney and Marvel Studios. At that time, Marvel was internally referring to The Kang Dynasty as Avengers 5; by early 2024, Marvel Studios had decided to drop the Kang storyline and began searching for a new antagonist for the Multiverse Saga. At SDCC in July 2024, the fifth Avengers film was retitled Avengers: Doomsday (2026), with Robert Downey Jr.—who starred as the superhero Tony Stark / Iron Man in the Infinity Saga—cast as the Multiverse Saga's new antagonist Victor von Doom / Doctor Doom, for both Doomsday and Secret Wars. In July 2026, Feige said Secret Wars would "establish a streamlined, simplified, single universe that audiences can keep up with" and would feature some similarites and multiple differences. He said the X-Men would be integral to the next era of the MCU, which he called the "Mutant Saga". Feige reportedly had a 10-year plan for the X-Men in the MCU. Avengers: Endgame was re-released in September 2026 under the subtitle Encore, in anticipation of Doomsday's release. This helped it once again exceed Avatar to reclaim that box-office position and title.

In April 2026, Disney laid off about 8% of Marvel employees across the company, including nearly the entire Marvel Studios visual development department. A small team was retained to help oversee the hiring of artists for each project moving forward, with many of the former full-time employees transitioning to contractors. The layoffs reportedly resulted from the reduced Marvel Studios production slate, along with Disney's announced general cost-cutting and workforce reductions. Feige had originally championed the creation of the visual development department to help translate the specific look of the comic books to their projects. The following month, Winderbaum was promoted to the head of television, animation, comics, and franchise for Marvel. In his new role, Winderbaum would oversee the creative direction of the publishing unit, global brands, and franchises, in addition to his work at the studio. In July 2026, Feige and Winderbaum announced that Marvel Comics would relocate its headquarters and over 100 employees from Manhattan, New York, to the Walt Disney Studios Burbank lot alongside Marvel Studios by the following July. Feige believed that this move signified a long-term investment in the publishing unit and would reinvigorate its storytelling, which had been "overshadowed" by the MCU films.

== Character rights ==
Marvel had licensed out the film rights to many of its characters to other studios in the 1990s, starting with the X-Men. and included, among others, Man-Thing, Deathlok, and Prime. Marvel Studios has since regained many of those rights, including Black Panther from Columbia Pictures and Artisan Entertainment and Iron Man from New Line Cinema in 2005; Thor from Columbia and Black Widow from Lionsgate Films in 2006; Iron Fist from Lionsgate and Doctor Strange by 2009; Blade from New Line and Daredevil from 20th Century Fox and New Regency in 2012; and Ghost Rider and Luke Cage from Columbia and the Punisher from Lionsgate in 2013.

In 2016, 20th Century Fox was able to change the powers of Negasonic Teenage Warhead for Deadpool (2016) by giving Marvel Studios the rights to Ego the Living Planet, who first appears in the film Guardians of the Galaxy Vol. 2 (2017). On December 14, 2017, Disney agreed to purchase 20th Century Fox's owner 21st Century Fox, after it spun off some of its businesses as Fox Corporation, with Disney regaining the rights to the Fantastic Four and X-Men characters, and Deadpool; the deal was completed on March 20, 2019. Constantin Film had originally licensed the film rights of the Fantastic Four in 1986.

Several other characters have had more complex situations regarding their rights:

- Hulk: The film rights to the Hulk reverted to Marvel Studios from Universal Pictures in 2006, after the latter failed to enter production on a sequel to director Ang Lee's film Hulk (2003). Universal, however, for letting the rights revert to Marvel before they even expired, retained the right of first refusal to distribute future standalone Hulk films. In March 2023, Citigroup financial analyst Jason Bazinet felt Disney may try to include the distribution rights to the Hulk and Namor in any potential sale of the streaming service Hulu to Comcast, the owner of Universal Pictures through NBCUniversal. In June 2023, the distribution rights to The Incredible Hulk (2008) reverted to Marvel and Disney.
- Spider-Man: In February 2015, Marvel Studios and Sony Pictures Entertainment announced that Spider-Man would appear in the MCU, with the character appearing in Captain America: Civil War (2016) and Sony releasing Spider-Man: Homecoming, produced by Feige and Amy Pascal, in July 2017. As part of the deal, Sony Pictures would continue to finance, distribute, own, and have final creative control of the Spider-Man films. In June 2015, Feige clarified that the initial Sony deal did not allow Spider-Man to appear in any of the MCU television series, as it was "very specific... with a certain amount of back and forth allowed". In September 2019, it was announced that Disney and Sony had reached a new agreement allowing for Spider-Man to appear in a third standalone film (produced by Marvel Studios and Feige) and a future Marvel Studios film. Disney was reported to be co-financing 25% of the film in exchange for 25% of the film's profits in the new agreement, while retaining the merchandising rights to the character. By November 2021, a new trilogy of films with Marvel Studios was planned, beginning with Spider-Man: Brand New Day (2026). Sony's agreement specifies that production has to start on a film within three years and nine months of the previous one, and release within five years and nine months, otherwise the rights revert to Marvel. Marvel Studios can use Spider-Man in short-form animated series, while Sony retains rights to the character for long-form television. Sony has access to 856 characters within its agreement, including Wilson Fisk / Kingpin, who can be used by both Sony and Marvel Studios. Vincent D'Onofrio, who portrays Wilson Fisk in the MCU, explained that Marvel Studios is only allowed to use the character in television series. Feige subsequently clarified that while the character's rights did not prevent an appearance in an MCU film, there were still some "things to navigate".
- Namor: In 2002, Marvel announced a deal with Universal Pictures to make a Namor film. In 2012, Marvel Entertainment CCO Joe Quesada believed Namor's rights had reverted to Marvel, yet Feige said in August 2013 this was not so. However, Feige expanded in July 2014, saying that Marvel Studios, not Universal Pictures or Legendary Pictures, could make a Namor film, but clarified that there were some "entanglements" to resolve from earlier contracts that complicated using the character at that point. In June 2016, Quesada again stated that, to his knowledge, the film rights to Namor had returned to Marvel. In October 2018, Feige noted the character could appear in the MCU, with the studio still deciding how it would use the character. The character first appeared in the MCU in Black Panther: Wakanda Forever (2022). In November 2022, Marvel Studios executive Nate Moore confirmed that they cannot make a standalone Namor film since Universal still holds the character's distribution rights, similar to the Hulk.

== Corporate structure ==
=== Units ===
The logos for the Marvel Animation and Marvel Television labels of Marvel Studios that were introduced in 2024
- MVL Productions LLC – film slate subsidiary
- Marvel Studios Animation – a "mini-studio" formed in June 2021 to oversee the development of Marvel Studios' animated series through the "Marvel Animation" banner
- Marvel Music, Inc. (2005–present) – subsidiary involved in the publishing of music related to its productions. The company was incorporated on September 9, 2005, and was announced as a label for releasing music related to Marvel's film and television productions in 2009. Marvel Music has released albums in conjunction with Disney's Hollywood Records.
- Marvel Television (2024–present) – a unit label used for live-action Marvel television series. This is separate from the Marvel Television production company that was absorbed and shut down in 2019.
- Marvel Animation Inc., internally known as Marvel Family Entertainment (June 2004; 2008–2015; 2019) – subsidiary charged with oversight of Marvel's animation productions outside the MCU. Marvel Animation was returned to being placed under Marvel Studios in October 2019.

Additionally, Marvel Studios frequently uses various limited liability company (LLC) units through which each MCU production operates. Their names correspond to the title of each project.

=== Key people ===
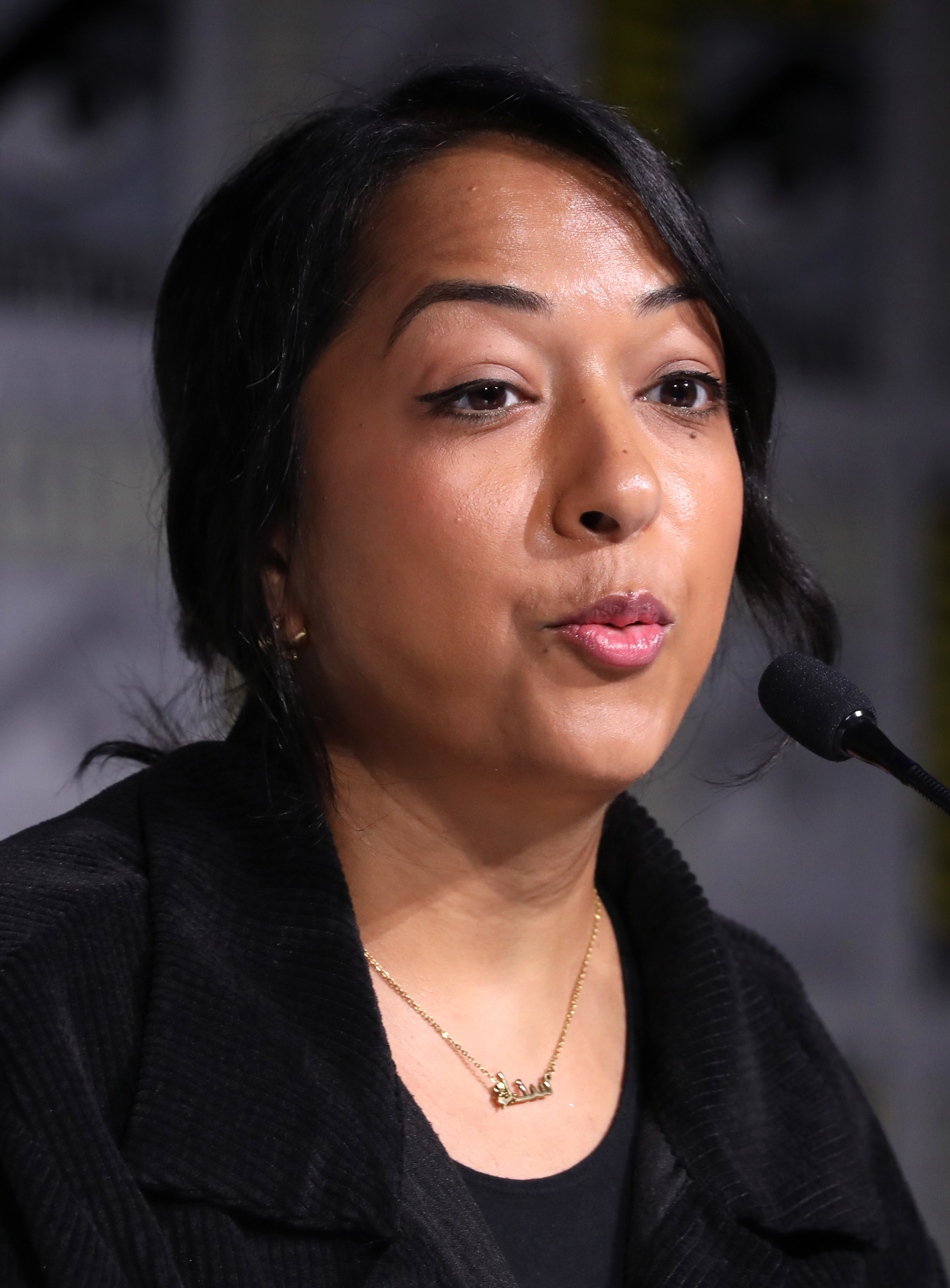
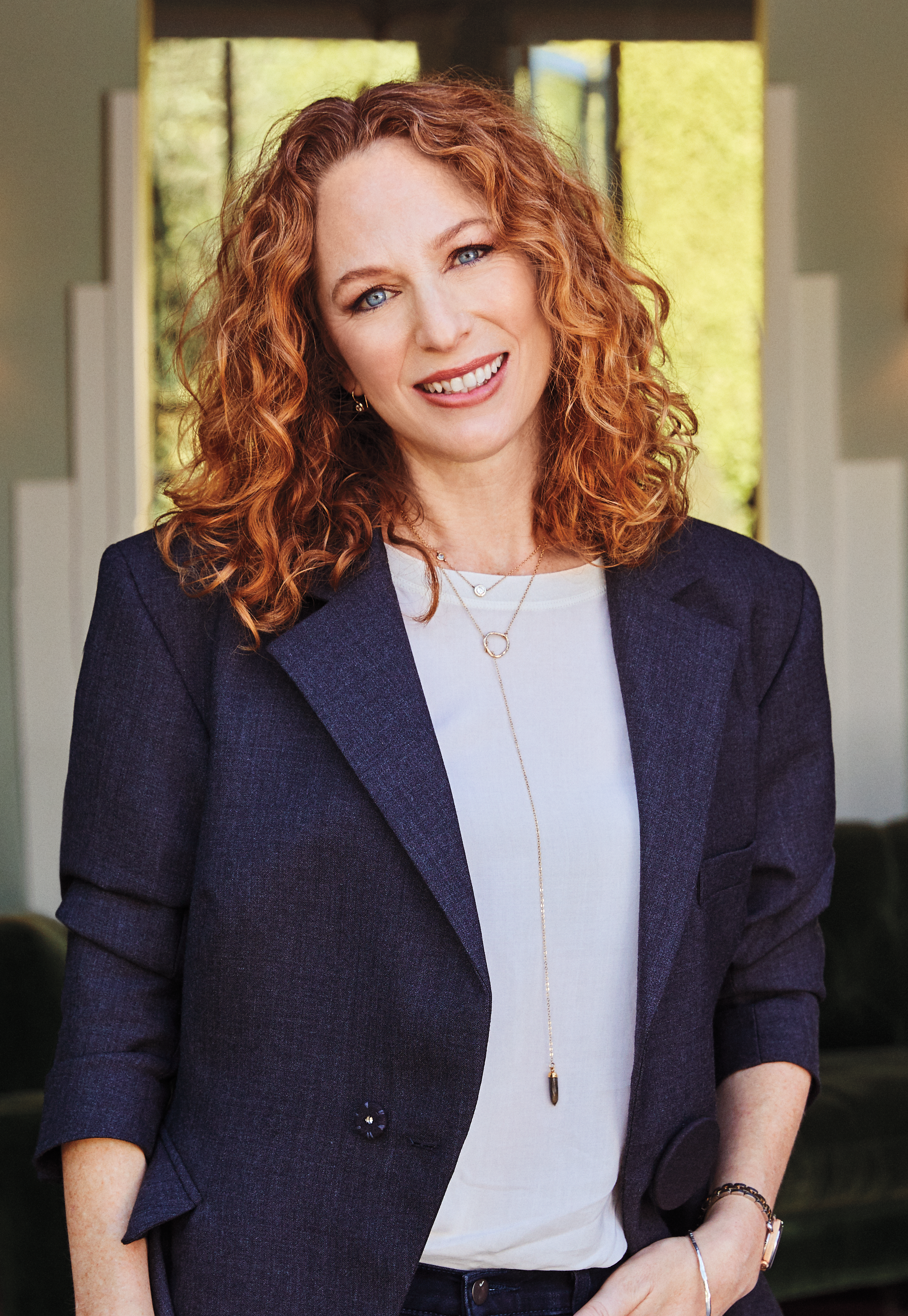
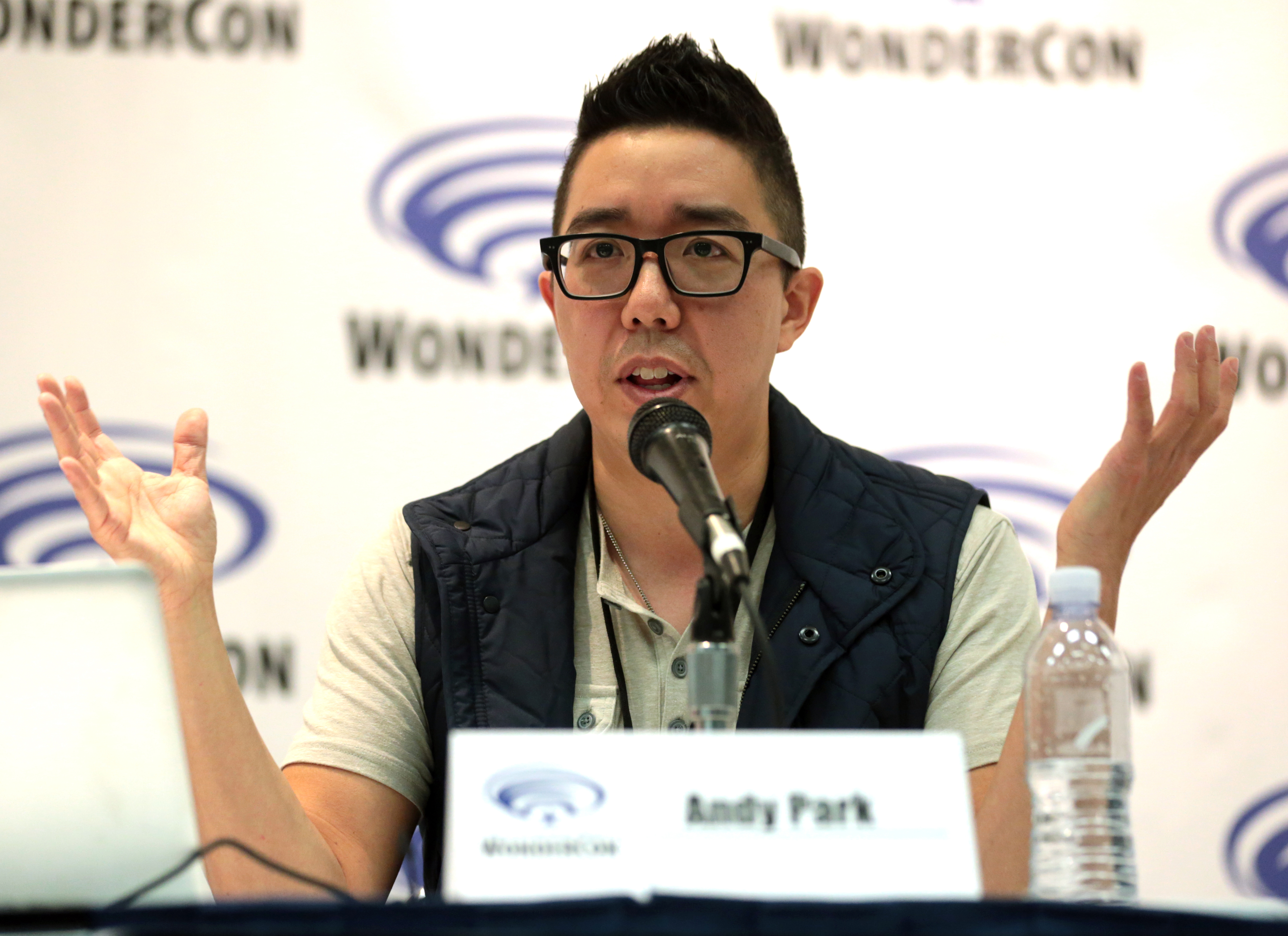
Comic book writer Sana Amanat (top left) is one of Marvel Studios' production and development executives, while casting director Sarah Halley Finn (top right) has worked on all of the studio's MCU films and television series, for many of which artist and illustrator Andy Park (bottom) has provided visual designs

Marvel Studios is led by its president and primary producer Kevin Feige and co-president Louis D'Esposito. The "Marvel Studios Parliament", otherwise known as "The Parliament", is the creative decision-making committee at Marvel Studios and a "brain trust" of long-time executives who help to elevate each other's projects where possible. Members of the Parliament include executives of production and development Stephen Broussard and Trinh Tran, creative director and the head of visual development and character design Ryan Meinerding, vice president of production and development Jonathan Schwartz, and the head of television, animation, comics, and franchise Brad Winderbaum, who was formerly a vice president of production and development, as well as the head of streaming.

Meinerding oversees the studio's Visual Development group, originally an in-house group of around 13 to 15 artists who work on a project from its start to provide a consistent look for the studio, including designs for characters, costumes, and moments that can help shape the project's story. Part of the group included artist and illustrator Andy Park, who joined in 2010 and later served as a Director of Visual Development, as well as Wesley Burt and Michael Uwandi. By April 2026, the majority of the in-house Visual Development group had been laid off, including Park, with former full-time employees transitioning to contractors for projects moving forward, and would continue to report to Meinerding.

Several studio executives serve as lead producers on films and television series in the studio's Production and Development group, working on each project from their inception through their release as managers alongside other executives. Some of these executives include comic book writer Sana Amanat, Brian Chapek, Grant Curtis, Brian Gay, and television executive Richie Palmer. Chapek joined the studio in 2011 but initially left in September 2020 to launch his own production company that had Marvel as a client, before he was rehired in June 2023 after his father Bob Chapek was terminated as Disney's CEO. Gay and Palmer previously worked under Feige as his executive coordinator and production assistant, respectively, before joining the executive group.

Other executives at Marvel Studios include the vice presidents of physical production Mitchell Bell and David J. Grant, property master Russell Bobbitt, frequent executive producer Charles Newirth, vice president of visual effects and stereo Jen Underdahl, and Dana Vasquez-Eberhardt, the vice president of animation. Additionally, Sarah Halley Finn has served as a frequent casting director for several MCU films and television series, while Eric Pearson became one of the studio's "go-to" writers. He started in Marvel Studios' writers program and worked on a number of their earlier feature films and Marvel One-Shot short films, before writing the screenplays for Thor: Ragnarok (2017), Black Widow (2021), Thunderbolts* (2025), and The Fantastic Four: First Steps (2025).

Many executives who worked at Marvel Studios subsequently left the studio for varied reasons. Avi Arad founded Marvel Studios and was its chairman and CEO until his exit in 2006. Victoria Alonso joined in 2006 as a co-producer and the executive vice president of visual effects and post-production. In 2011, she became an executive producer on the studio's films, starting with The Avengers, as well as the executive vice president of production. In September 2021, Alonso was promoted to president of physical production, post-production, VFX, and animation, but was fired in March 2023. Other former executives include: Dave Bushore, who joined the studio in 2009 and left in September 2024, after serving as Winderbaum's executive coordinator and later the vice president of franchise, creative, and immersive development; Eric Hauserman Carroll, a Production and Development executive and former director of development; Chris Gary, a Production and Development executive; Michael Helfant, who served from November 2005 until March 2007 as its president and chief operating officer; Jeremy Latcham, the SVP of Production and Development; David Maisel, who was the chairman, vice-chairman, president, and chief operating officer and was subsequently credited as Marvel Studios's Founding Chairman; Nate Moore, who joined in 2010 and left in March 2025, after serving as the vice president of Production and Development; Kevin R. Wright, a Production and Development manager and creative executive; Karim Zreik, the SVP of original programming and production for Marvel Television.

== Production library ==
=== Marvel Cinematic Universe ===
Marvel Studios produces feature and short films, live-action and animated television series, and television specials set within the Marvel Cinematic Universe. The following lists provide more comprehensive information:

- List of Marvel Cinematic Universe films – Marvel Studios feature films
- Marvel One-Shots and Team Thor – Marvel Studios short films
- List of Marvel Cinematic Universe television series (Marvel Studios) – Marvel Studios television series
- Marvel's Special Presentations – Marvel Studios television specials

=== Other projects ===
==== Marvel Films productions ====
As Marvel Films, the studio co-produced the following animated series: X-Men: The Animated Series (1992–1997); Fantastic Four and Iron Man (both 1994–1996); Spider-Man: The Animated Series (1994–1998); and The Incredible Hulk (1996–1997). The studio also co-produced the 1996 television pilot Generation X with New World Entertainment for Fox, but it was not picked up for a series order.

==== Marvel Knights ====
Marvel Studios operated a short-lived production arm called Marvel Knights to produce some of Marvel's darker and lesser-known titles. The name originated from the Marvel Knights comic book imprint. The banner released only two films: the Punisher franchise reboot film Punisher: War Zone (2008) and Ghost Rider: Spirit of Vengeance (2011).

==== Live-action series ====
Marvel Studios produced the 2001–2004 Mutant X series, which was not based on Marvel Comics, for broadcast syndication through Tribune Entertainment, collaborated with Marvel Television on the 2015–2016 ABC series Agent Carter, and inherited the 2020 Hulu series Helstrom from Marvel Television, which oversaw early development and production.

==== Animation ====
Animated series co-produced by Marvel Studios include Silver Surfer (1998), Spider-Man Unlimited (1999–2001), and The Avengers: United They Stand (1999–2000) with Saban Entertainment for Fox Kids; X-Men: Evolution (2000–2003) with Film Roman for Kids' WB; Fantastic Four: World's Greatest Heroes (2006–2007) with MoonScoop for Cartoon Network; and Wolverine and the X-Men (2009) for Nicktoons. Marvel Studios produced eight direct-to-video short films with Marvel Animation called Marvel Animated Features that were released from 2006 until 2011 by Lionsgate Home Entertainment.

Additionally, Marvel Studios inherited the Hulu adult animated series M.O.D.O.K. (2021) and Hit-Monkey (2021–2024) from Marvel Television, which oversaw early development and production. Production of Hit-Monkey moved to Disney's 20th Television Animation for its second season. Marvel Studios also produced the Lego animated Disney+ specials Lego Marvel Avengers: Code Red (2023) and Lego Marvel Avengers: Mission Demolition (2024).

==== Documentaries ====
Documentaries produced by Marvel Studios for Disney+ include the television special Marvel Studios: Expanding the Universe (2019) as well as three docuseries: Marvel Studios: Legends (2021–present), Marvel Studios: Assembled (2021–2024), and MPower (2023).

== Logo ==
=== Films and television series designs ===
Logo animation (2013–2016), featuring the first Marvel Studios fanfare created by Brian Tyler (0:28).

Starting with the release of Spider-Man in 2002, Marvel Studios introduced its "flipbook" production logo, created by Imaginary Forces. This logo was accompanied by music from the film's score, sound effects, or a song, to lead into the beginning of the film. This was the logo seen in front of all of the studio's films until 2013, when the logo was updated with the release of Thor: The Dark World, again created by Imaginary Forces. Feige stated that since Marvel was now its own entity within Disney, it felt appropriate to introduce a more prominent updated display in the opening of its films instead of the co-production and distribution partner logos accompanying it. Feige added that they "didn't want to re-invent the wheel [with the new logo], but we wanted it to feel bigger, to feel more substantial, which is why it starts with the flip, but suddenly it's more dimensional as we go through the lettering and it reveals itself with the metallic sheen before settling into the white-on-red, well known Marvel logo, with the added flourish of the arrival and the announcement of the Studios at the bottom of the word Marvel." Imaginary Forces used the same animation technique on the updated logo, as they did when they created the first version in 2002. They were given a few hundred comic books to select images from, and ultimately chose 120 that were "universal and not specific to one character" and created a narrative "where each image spoke to the one before it and after." The new logo appeared on all subsequent studio productions set within the MCU through Captain America: Civil War. With the addition of the new logo, Marvel Studios also added a fanfare to accompany the logo, composed by Brian Tyler, who wrote the scores to Iron Man 3, Thor: The Dark World, and Avengers: Age of Ultron.

Logo animation (2016–present), featuring the second Marvel Studios fanfare created by Michael Giacchino (0:37).

Another new logo and opening debuted in July 2026, featuring an updated fanfare composed by Michael Giacchino, who first worked with Marvel Studios on the score to Doctor Strange (2016). The new opening begins with comic book panels seen in the previous two openings before transitioning into footage and art of characters from the MCU films. The updated logo was first featured ahead of Doctor Strange, and was designed by Perception, which Marvel approached in January 2016 to update its logo. Feige specifically requested Perception "to combine the brand and the iconic characters into a single image, showcasing the heroes within the letterforms of the Marvel logo." The Perception team settled on a concept they dubbed "How to Build a Universe", which "was designed to pay tribute to [the filmmaking] process by touching on" how a film's origins are inspired by the comics, which then results in a script, followed by concept art, resulting in the final film. Perception was inspired by the initial "flipbook" logo and paid tribute to it in the new opening, which is identical to the flipbook logo. Next, the opening includes "various lines lifted directly from the script pages of various Marvel screenplays", with Perception selecting "both iconic fan-favorites, as well as lines that helped establish the breadth of the Marvel Universe." To add in the concept art images, Perception looked "through a massive archive of concept art and "The Art Of..." books, to select the most iconic images for each beloved character. Utilizing the original digital paintings themselves, the Perception team animated each image being painted from scratch. The final touch was mapping this artwork onto 3D models to giving these once 2D paintings a sense of depth as the camera moves around them." Finally, over 70 pieces of footage from the 13 films that had been released at that time were included, with Perception arranging them in a way they called the "vault", "where luminescent footage plays on the interior walls of the 'Marvel' logotype."

The Marvel Studios logo for the MCU's 10th anniversary

A modified version of Perception's logo was introduced at the 2017 D23 Expo to commemorate the 10th anniversary of the MCU. The logo debuted with Avengers: Infinity War (2018) and was used again in Ant-Man and the Wasp (2018). This logo was altered for Captain Marvel to honor Stan Lee, who died on November 12, 2018, a few months before the film's release. The characters were replaced with Lee's MCU cameos and other public appearances related to the MCU, accompanied by a black screen reading "Thank You Stan". Similarly, the logo was retroactively modified for the Disney+ version of Black Panther (2018) in honor of T'Challa / Black Panther star Chadwick Boseman, who died on August 28, 2020. The characters were replaced with images and footage of the actor and character. The logo premiered on November 29, 2020, which would have been Boseman's 44th birthday. Additional modifications include having the characters who disappeared in the Blip removed for Avengers: Endgame; an additional Boseman tribute one for Black Panther: Wakanda Forever (2022); and an all-Guardians of the Galaxy opening for Guardians of the Galaxy Vol. 3 (2023). A shortened sequence opening was used for the Disney+ series Secret Invasion (2023). "What If... Strange Supreme Intervened?" (2023), the What If...? season two finale, replaced the live-action footage of the logo with animated images from What If...?. Captain America: Brave New World (2025) was the first Marvel Studios film where the studio's logo animation sequence was not featured.

Thunderbolts* (2025) introduced an updated logo animation that reverted to the presentation of the Imaginary Forces sequence from 2013 to 2016, cycling through comic book panels themed around the relevant characters while panning around the three-dimensional lettering. The Thunderbolts* logo also featured the added visual of the Void's shadows blackening the text and quieting the Michael Giacchino fanfare. The opening logo of Spider-Man: Brand New Day (2026) features scenes from the previous MCU Spider-Man films with Peter Parker / Spider-Man disappearing from the footage, to explain the narrative effects of the ending of its predecessor, Spider-Man: No Way Home (2021).

=== Television specials design ===
Television specials from Marvel Studios, known as Special Presentations, feature a special multicolored intro with bongo drum music, reminiscent of the CBS Special Presentation theme featured before animated holiday specials of the 1980s and 1990s. The intro was also designed by Perception, with Giacchino—who directed and composed for the special Werewolf by Night—once again creating the music. Jamie Lovett at ComicBook.com called the Special Presentation intro "more colorful" and its fanfare "more playful" than the normal Marvel Studios intro.

== Accolades ==
The following twelve MCU films have grossed over $1 billion worldwide and are thus among the highest-grossing films of all time: The Avengers (2012), Iron Man 3 (2013), Avengers: Age of Ultron (2015), Captain America: Civil War (2016), Black Panther (2018), Avengers: Infinity War (2018), Captain Marvel (2019), Avengers: Endgame (2019), Spider-Man: Far From Home (2019), Spider-Man: No Way Home (2021), Deadpool & Wolverine (2024), and Spider-Man: Brand New Day (2026); Infinity War, Endgame, and Brand New Day each grossed over $2 billion. Endgame was the highest-grossing film of all time worldwide between 2019 and 2021, overtaking and later surpassed by Avatar (2009), before its September 2026 re-release, subtitled Encore, helped it once again exceed Avatar to reclaim that box-office position and title.

== See also ==
- List of films based on Marvel Comics publications
- List of television series based on Marvel Comics publications
  - Marvel's ABC television series
  - Marvel's Netflix television series
  - Marvel's young adult television series
  - "Adventure into Fear"
- Outline of the Marvel Cinematic Universe
- Reception of the Marvel Cinematic Universe
- List of unproduced Marvel Comics adaptations
  - List of unproduced film projects based on Marvel Comics
  - List of unproduced television projects based on Marvel Comics
- Marvel Entertainment
  - Sony's Spider-Man Universe
- DC Entertainment and DC Studios
  - DC Extended Universe
  - DC Universe (franchise)
