= Visual Effects Society =

Organization for visual effects practitioners

- Abbreviation: VES
- Formation: 1977
- Website: www.vesglobal.org

The Visual Effects Society (VES) is an entertainment industry organization representing visual effects practitioners including artists, animators, technologists, model makers, educators, studio leaders, supervisors, PR/marketing specialists and producers in film, television, commercials, music videos, and video games. It has about 5,000 members in 50 countries. Since 2002 it has produced the Visual Effects Society Awards which honor the best work of the previous year in various categories.

== The VES List of the Most Influential Visual Effects films ==
In 2007, the Visual Effects Society unveiled their list of the 50 most influential films in visual effects. Due to ties, there were actually 51 films in the list. The films were:

- 1. Star Wars (1977)
- 2. Blade Runner (1982)
- 3. 2001: A Space Odyssey (1968)
- (tie) The Matrix (1999)
- 5. Jurassic Park (1993)
- 6. Tron (1982)
- 7. King Kong (1933)
- 8. Close Encounters of the Third Kind (1977)
- 9. Alien (1979)
- 10. The Abyss (1989)
- 11. The Empire Strikes Back (1980)
- 12. Metropolis (1927)
- 13. A Trip to the Moon (1902)
- 14. Terminator 2: Judgment Day (1991)
- 15. The Wizard of Oz (1939)
- 16. Who Framed Roger Rabbit (1988)
- 17. Raiders of the Lost Ark (1981)
- 18. Titanic (1997)
- 19. The Lord of the Rings: The Fellowship of the Ring (2001)
- 20. Jason and the Argonauts (1963)
- (tie) E.T. the Extra-Terrestrial (1982)
- 22. Toy Story (1995)
- 23. Pirates of the Caribbean: Dead Man's Chest (2006)
- 24. The Ten Commandments (1956)
- 25. The War of the Worlds (1953)
- (tie) Forrest Gump (1994)
- (tie) Citizen Kane (1941)
- (tie) The 7th Voyage of Sinbad (1958)
- (tie) 20,000 Leagues Under the Sea (1954)
- 30. The Terminator (1984)
- 31. Aliens (1986)
- 32. Mary Poppins (1964)
- 33. The Lord of the Rings: The Return of the King (2003)
- 34. Forbidden Planet (1956)
- 35. Babe (1995)
- 36. The Day the Earth Stood Still (1951)
- (tie) The Lord of the Rings: The Two Towers (2002)
- 38. King Kong (2005)
- 39. Planet of the Apes (1968)
- 40. Fantastic Voyage (1966)
- 41. Jaws (1975)
- 42. Ghostbusters (1984)
- 43. Sin City (2005)
- 44. Superman (1978)
- 45. Snow White and the Seven Dwarfs (1937)
- 46. The Lost World (1925)
- (tie) Return of the Jedi (1983)
- 48. What Dreams May Come (1998)
- 49. An American Werewolf in London (1981)
- 50. Darby O'Gill and the Little People (1958)
- (tie) The Fifth Element (1997)

In 2017, an additional 21 films were added to the list:

- 300 (2007)
- Apollo 13 (1995)
- Avatar (2009)
- Back to the Future (1985)
- The Curious Case of Benjamin Button (2008)
- District 9 (2009)
- Ex Machina (2015)
- Gertie the Dinosaur (1914)
- Godzilla (1954)
- Gravity (2013)
- Inception (2010)
- Independence Day (1996)
- Life of Pi (2012)
- Mad Max: Fury Road (2015)
- The Mask (1994)
- Rise of the Planet of the Apes (2011)
- Starship Troopers (1997)
- The Thing (1982)
- Total Recall (1990)
- Transformers (2007)
- Young Sherlock Holmes (1985)

== See also ==
- VFX Union
