= Reception of the Marvel Cinematic Universe =

Produced by Marvel Studios since 2008, and under the ownership of the Walt Disney Company since 2009, the Marvel Cinematic Universe (MCU) is a media franchise, with over 35 films and 20 television series already produced. Operating with shared universe storytelling, the media franchise has had significant commercial success and has largely received positive critical reviews. However, it has also been criticized by filmmakers for its impact on the film industry, most notably in comments made by Martin Scorsese in 2019, which provoked significant debate among filmmakers. The series has also seen criticism from activists for its representation of minority characters and relationship with the American military.

== Revenue ==
As of June 2022, the MCU is the highest-grossing film franchise in history, having collectively grossed over $26 billion in box-office revenue, more than twice that by the second largest franchise, Star Wars. In 2021, the MCU comprised around 30% of the total revenue in North America, up from 18% in 2018. The Marvels (2023), at $206 million, is the franchise's lowest-grossing entry and biggest failure, whereas Avengers: Endgame (2019) is their biggest success, grossing $2.9 billion, making it the highest-grossing film of all time.

== Accolades ==
The films within the franchise have received a number of awards and other accolades. They have been nominated for a total of 27 Academy Awards, winning four; 13 British Academy Film Awards, winning one; 170 Saturn Awards, winning 40; and 14 Hugo Awards, winning two. Black Panther (2018) received seven nominations at the 91st Academy Awards, including the first ever Best Picture nomination for a superhero film, and won three for Best Costume Design, Best Production Design, and Best Original Score, making it the first MCU film to win an Academy Award. In 2022, the Library of Congress selected Iron Man for preservation in the U.S. National Film Registry, as being "culturally, historically, or aesthetically significant. This was the first MCU film and only the third superhero film ever to receive that recognition.

== Impact on filmmaking ==
The MCU has been credited with the popularization of the shared universe in film. In 2012, Tom Russo of Boston.com stated in response to the release of The Avengers that "you don't hear 'universe' much in the film industry." In 2014, Tuna Amobi of Standard & Poor's Equity Research Services stated that there had been a shift in the last five years towards the creation of megafranchises, due largely to the success of the MCU, as "Disney has proved that this can be a gold mine." According to the Business Review at the University of California, Berkeley, the franchise has helped create a new wave in Hollywood, where filmmaking is dominated by "franchises/sequels that rely on the overall brand, rather than star-power in standalone films."

A number of critics have proposed that the franchise has had a deleterious effect on filmmaking, particularly in leading towards a film industry that places less emphasis on creating original stories and more emphasis on creating blockbuster franchises based around selling content related to an intellectual property. (Note: Attributed to multiple references:) Film journalist Ian Leslie has stated that Hollywood increasingly "thinks about films in the same way" as the MCU, which is to say as "the primary building blocks of multi-story, multimedia universes," adding that "everyone would like to emulate the Marvel model but nobody has done so on the same scale." Colin Yeo of the University of Western Australia has said that the franchise "represents the apex of big budget filmmaking," arguing that "shared universe franchises represent an ultimate form of commercialization" due to their ability to exploit brand loyalty beyond just the films themselves.

In a 2019 interview, filmmaker Martin Scorsese criticized the MCU as "not cinema," later elaborating in an article in The New York Times that he felt there was no risk in the franchise as "everything in them is officially sanctioned... market-researched, audience-tested, vetted, modified, revetted and remodified until they're ready for consumption." A number of other high-profile filmmakers have leveled similar criticism against the franchise, including Denis Villeneuve, who stated that there were "too many Marvel movies that are nothing more than a 'cut and paste' of others," Ken Loach, who called the franchise a "cynical exercise" designed to make "a commodity which will make a profit for a big corporation," and Francis Ford Coppola, who argued that "I don't know that anyone gets anything out of seeing the same movie over and over again."

However, Scorsese's comments provoked significant debate, with the Russo brothers stating that "we define cinema as a film that can bring people together to have a shared, emotional experience," and with James Gunn arguing that "many of our grandfathers thought all gangster movies were the same... Superheroes are simply today's gangsters/cowboys/outer space adventurers." Alex Abad-Santos of Vox argued that there was a risk of conflating the impact of the MCU as a whole on the filmmaking industry with the quality of the individual films within the MCU, adding that "the emotional connections that Marvel fans forged with its characters are earnest and telling." Raul Velasquez of GameRant has argued that "Disney's corporate consolidation has not changed blockbuster movies as much as it has centralized them." J.D. Connor of the University of Southern California has argued that "mega-conglomeration" of Hollywood franchises is a trend that started before the MCU, with the Telecommunications Act of 1996 in particular.

In a 2023 podcast, actor and comedian Adam DeVine theorized that the MCU "ruined comedies", arguing that moviegoers were more willing to purchase tickets to see larger budget superhero films rather than smaller budget comedic films in theaters and suggested that the MCU's films were being used as substitutes for traditional comedies, noting the franchise's reliance on humor.

== Criticism ==
=== Business and labor practices ===
Damon Young of the University of Melbourne has argued that "the vast Marvel Cinematic Universe was built by low-waged, precarious labor." The franchise has criticism from visual effects artists for poor working conditions, including understaffing, low pay, and bad management. Writing in Vulture.com, one artist who had worked on MCU productions stated that they had worked "seven days a week, averaging 64 hours a week on a good week," and that the demanded "regular changes way in excess of what any other client does," elaborating that "maybe a month or two before a movie comes out, Marvel will have us change the entire third act."

In 2021, actor Scarlett Johansson, who played Black Widow in the MCU, filed a lawsuit against Disney over the simultaneous release of the titular Black Widow film in both theaters and on streaming service Disney+. The lawsuit alleged that this had breached her contract and had blocked her from receiving a bonus from box-office profits. The lawsuit was settled later in 2021.

The franchise has also faced criticism for its business practices regarding comic book creators. Joe Casey, one of the creators of character America Chavez, has stated that there were "systemic flaws in the way that creators are neither respected nor rewarded," pointing in particular to the use of Chavez in Doctor Strange in the Multiverse of Madness (2022), for which he had received no compensation.

In July 2022, visual effects artists from multiple companies that do contractual work for Marvel spoke out against mistreatment by Marvel and other studios. Marvel's alleged tendency to "pixelfuck" artists by demanding last minute, minute additions to work, often coming from multiple personnel from the studio side with no clear communication was criticized.

In the wake of Marvel Studios firing executive vice president of film production Victoria Alonso for breach of contract in March 2023, criticism from VFX workers were noted, who had raised complaints of Marvel's "demanding post-production schedules". Alonso was described by some as a "kingmaker", and "challenging to work with", with Chris Lee at Vulture reporting that Alonso was "singularly responsible for Marvel's toxic work environment" with VFX workers. Alonso reportedly took days off to produce Argentina, 1985 instead of her post-production commitments for the various Marvel Cinematic Universe projects, which in turn resulted in the need to delay several projects in 2022 and 2023. However, Alonso was also described as the "epitome of professional" and supportive on set, with Joanna Robinson of The Ringer describing the reports as a "gross mischaracterization" and the opposite of Alonso's work. Following Alonso's firing, visual effects vendors for the various MCU projects were working with producer Jen Underdahl. In August 2023, more than 50 of Marvel's on-set VFX production crew filed a petition for an election to be represented by the International Alliance of Theatrical Stage Employees with the National Labor Relations Board.

=== Style ===
The MCU has faced criticism for the similarity in style between its films, with some critics saying that it is overly homogenous. Dais Johnston of Inverse states that "the 'Marvel movie' has become its own genre, an archetype for polished, epic, action-packed, films filled with one-liners. Despite some aesthetic differences, each MCU movie slots into this style with little to no resistance." However, others have defended the style of the franchise as valuable for its own cultural niche. Omer M. Mozaffar of Loyola University Chicago has argued that "sometimes, after a long week, I need a giant crowd-pleasing spectacle that entertains me," saying that even if the franchise was not challenging, "there is an optimism that permeates all the films."

The franchise has further faced criticism for the size of the shared universe, with some critics contending that it has become confusing and that the increasing level of interconnectivity makes the franchise less easily accessible for new viewers. (Note: Attributed to multiple references:) However, Dais Johnston of Inverse has argued that the concept of "Marvel homework" is a myth, saying that "there's no need to get so caught up in the interconnection between them that we can't enjoy them as fully formed stories in their own right."

The franchise had also faced criticism for the large amount of releases, with some critics arguing that it has put itself at risk of oversaturation or of "Marvel fatigue." Phase One of the MCU, which lasted from 2008 to 2012, saw the release of six films, whereas Phase Four saw the release of four films and five television series in 2021 alone. However, Peter Suderman of Vox has stated that the MCU has showcased a high "level of both consistency and quality," and Julia Alexander of The Verge has argued that the risk faced by the MCU is not fatigue, but trust, saying that Marvel's "greatest asset" was being able to ensure "quantity without losing the overarching story thread." Subsequently, in 2023, Disney delayed the release of several MCU productions to create space between each as a cost-cutting measure.

Several filmmakers have also argued that the MCU is "sexless" or as lacking in their portrayal of realistic romantic relationships, including Paul Verhoeven and Steven Soderbergh. (Note: Attributed to multiple references:) Joshua Rivera of Polygon described romances in the MCU as "conservative" and having a tendency to avoid "even the tamest signs of affection." In an essay titled Everyone Is Beautiful and No One Is Horny, science fiction writer RS Benedict argued that the MCU was among films that did not portray bodies as "a home to live in and be happy" but as "investments, which must always be optimized," comparing it to McMansions.

=== Representation of women ===
The MCU has faced criticism for its portrayal of women, particularly the lack of female characters in the first three phases of the franchise. (Note: Attributed to multiple references:) Captain Marvel (2019) was the first solo female-led film in the franchise and the 21st film to be released in the franchise.

Rebecca Wright of Cardiff University has argued that the films are "occasionally marred with a sense of humor that tends toward displays of toxic masculinity and casual misogyny" and that the "female Avengers are still constrained by emotional or romantic responsibility to their colleagues." Gita Jackson of Vice has argued that most female characters in the franchise tend to be arcs centered on "their roles as daughters or as people who can't bear daughters."

The franchise has also been criticized for repeatedly killing female characters as a plot device for the male characters' story arcs, a trope known as "fridging".

However, the franchise has also received positive reviews for an increasingly better portrayal of women since Phase Four. Ben Child of The Guardian has stated that watching the MCU catalog "is an experience in which we can almost see the base point of gender politics shifting before our very eyes."

=== LGBT+ representation ===
The franchise has been criticized by some as having poor representation of the LGBT+ community, including for a lack of queer characters. Avengers: Endgame (2019) the penultimate film of Phase Three, was the first film of the MCU in which a character was portrayed as queer on-screen, with an unnamed character portrayed by co-director Joe Russo as a grieving gay man in a single scene. The 2021 Loki series became the first in which the lead character was portrayed as queer on-screen.

The franchise has also been criticized for queerbaiting, in particular for hinting at characters being queer and promoting the franchise to the LGBT+ community without actually depicting those characters being queer on-screen or by only including queerness in very short scenes. In a Swansea University panel, writer Russell T Davies argued that "Loki makes one reference to being bisexual once, and everyone's like, 'Oh my god, it's like a pansexual show.' It's like one word... and we're meant to go, 'Thank you, Disney!'" At the Thor: Love and Thunder London premiere Q&A, in response to the question "How gay will the film be?" director Taika Waititi exclaimed that it would be "super gay"; some critics and moviegoers who saw the film expressed disappointment that the film, in their view, did not reflect this statement.

=== Whitewashing ===
The franchise has faced accusations of whitewashing, particularly for the characters of Wanda Maximoff, Pietro Maximoff, and the Ancient One. (Note: Attributed to multiple references:)

The franchise has also faced criticism for a lack of diversity, both in terms of characters and in terms of production staff. Of the first 23 MCU films, only two were directed by people of color and only one by a woman. In 2020, Sam Wilson actor Anthony Mackie stated that "it really bothered me that I've done seven Marvel movies where every producer, every director, every stunt person, every costume designer, every PA, every single person has been white."

=== Relationship with the military ===
A number of MCU films have been produced in collaboration with the United States Armed Forces, including access to military equipment and technical advice, in promotional campaigns, as well as in editing some script sequences. Steve Rose of The Guardian has written that the relationship between the MCU was strong throughout Phase One, until The Avengers (2012), which depicted a nuclear missile strike on New York, but that the relationship was mended by the release of Captain Marvel (2019). The role of the military in the MCU's production has raised concerns, with Akin Olla of The Guardian arguing that the MCU risked effectively being "propaganda that aims to sugarcoat the crimes of [the American] military and intelligence apparatuses." (Note: Attributed to multiple references:) Roger Stahl of the University of Georgia described the American military's role in Captain Marvel as "recruiting, they're rehabilitating the image of the Air Force, and they're appealing to an elusive but desirable demographic." In a 2019 paper in Studies in Popular Culture, Brett Pardy of McGill University argued that, even as the MCU downplayed explicit militarization:

S.H.I.E.L.D. and the Avengers, along with most of Hollywood's militainment, present a liberal fantasy of the military. They are effective and disciplined but not to the point of being dehumanized, interchangeable soldiers. They can be lethal but only to those who "deserve it." Their technology is advanced, functional, and accurate. In very exceptional circumstances, torture may be necessary, but it is always effective and reveals information, unlike in reality. These traits foster the perception of a "clean war," framing it in a way that makes it easier to obtain public support.

However, Guardians of the Galaxy (2014) director James Gunn has rejected claims that the Marvel needs formal approval from the American military for scripts, stating that "when a film uses military assets for free those specific scripts have to get military approval to make sure the military isn't disparaged," and adding that "the military is pretty loose about it." A 2020 paper from the Pontifical University of Salamanca found that "the representation of defense agencies and their institutions throughout the MCU films has an uneven nature", saying that portrayals of institutional corruption have risen in the MCU since Phase 1, but that portrayals of real military and law enforcement institutions has mostly disappeared in favor of fictional institutions such as S.H.I.E.L.D. Dais Johnston of Inverse has argued that "as long as Captain America remains in canon, American patriotism in the MCU will be tied to the Avengers", but that the portrayal of systemic issues facing military veterans in The Falcon and the Winter Soldier (2021) was "hopefully the first step in a long process of undoing the decade of Marvel mythology surrounding military life."

=== Generative A.I. and VFX techniques ===
In 2023, it was revealed that the series opening credits sequence of the Marvel Studios series Secret Invasion was created using generative AI to showcase "the shapeshifting tone of the series" according to Ali Selim. Reception to the sequence was met with backlash and disappointment from audiences and the animation industry. Major criticism includes that the argument was especially timely, since the Writers Guild of America voted to strike after failed negotiations with the Association of Motion Picture and Television Producers, which included language about protecting writers against the use of AI in the writing process. Over the past eight weeks, the use of AI to replace laborers has come to the forefront of many discussions about the strike. Storyboard artists and animators on the series expressed disappointment on the opening sequence.

During the 2023 SAG-AFTRA strike, it was revealed that several background actors for several Marvel Studios, Walt Disney Studios, Lucasfilm and Disney Branded Television productions were scanned to train a generative AI model to use their image on several episodes or films without their consent or additional payment. Alexandria Rubalcaba, told NPR that she, and other background actors, stated this was the case for those who worked on WandaVision and expressed worry that "AI is eventually going to weed out background actors." It was later asserted on social media that A.I. was used on a video clip from Disney Channel Original Movie Prom Pact, with users calling it "creepy", makes the film look like "hot garbage", and that AI is being used rather than paying workers "a living wage." However, The Hollywood Reporter later reported that the video clip did not use actors scanned by AI techniques but that the extras were created through other techniques using VFX, and stated that these "digital extras involved the work of CG artists" instead but was different from other films, as the digital extras were "more easily recognizable as inhuman.".
