= VFX Union =

North American labor union

- Visual Effects Union for the International Alliance of Theatrical Stage Employees, Moving Picture Technicians, Artists and Allied Crafts of the United States, Its Territories and Canada
- Abbreviation: IATSE VFX; VFX-IATSE
- Formation: 2012
- Type: Labor union
- Parent organization: International Alliance of Theatrical Stage Employees
- Website: vfxunion.org

VFX Union also known as the IATSE VFX Union, Visual Effects Union or International Alliance of Theatrical Stage Employees Visual Effects Union is a North American labor union for visual effects artists, and a wing of the International Alliance of Theatrical Stage Employees.

== History ==
The organization traces its origin to a group of 300 VFX artists who created the "VFX Production Group" on a Slack channel in 2020. They began to compare what salaries different studios provided. The VFX Union officially formed in 2012. In 2016 after the reports of poor working conditions on Sony's Sausage Party the IATSE filed a complaint with the British Columbia Ministry of Labour's Employment Standards Branch on behalf of the artists of the films and reached out to the VFX Union to offer help. Amidst the 2022 and 2023 Hollywood labor disputes the organization encouraged unionization among United States and Canadian visual effects artists. Among the IATSE VFX Union's services is performing surveys of workers' conditions within the industry. The first was published in March 2023. Their poll showed that two thirds of visual effects artists surveyed believed that the current situation in the industry was unsustainable.

== See also ==
- Labor unions in the United States
- Labor unions in Canada
- Visual Effects Society
