= Banjo ukulele =

Hybrid musical instrument

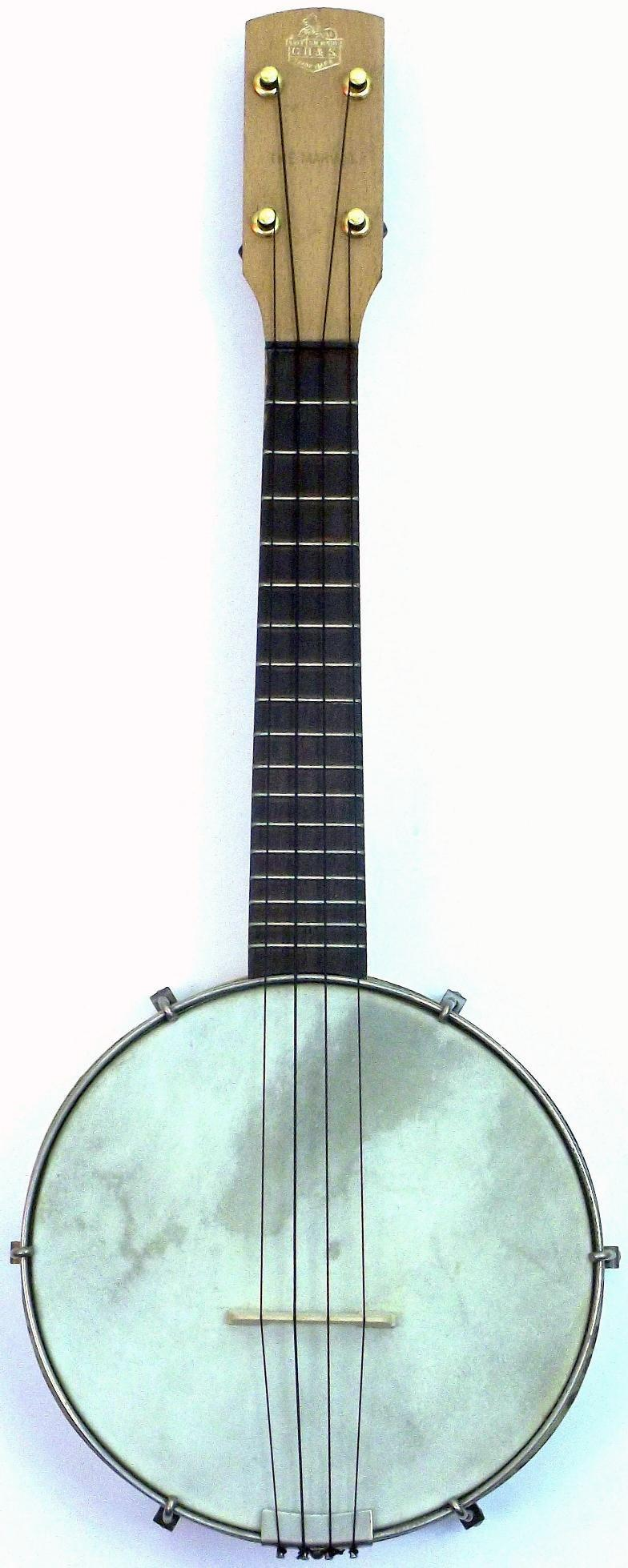
- Classification: String instrument (plucked)

Related instruments
- Ukulele, banjo

The banjo ukulele, also known as the banjolele or banjo uke, is a four-stringed musical instrument with a small banjo-type body and a fretted ukulele neck. The earliest known banjoleles were built by John A. Bolander and by Alvin D. Keech, both in 1917.

The instrument achieved its greatest popularity in the 1920s and 1930s, and combines the small scale, tuning, and playing style of a ukulele with the construction and distinctive tone of a banjo, hence the name. Its development was pushed by the need for vaudeville performers to have an instrument that could be played with the ease of the ukulele, but with more volume.

== Construction and tuning ==
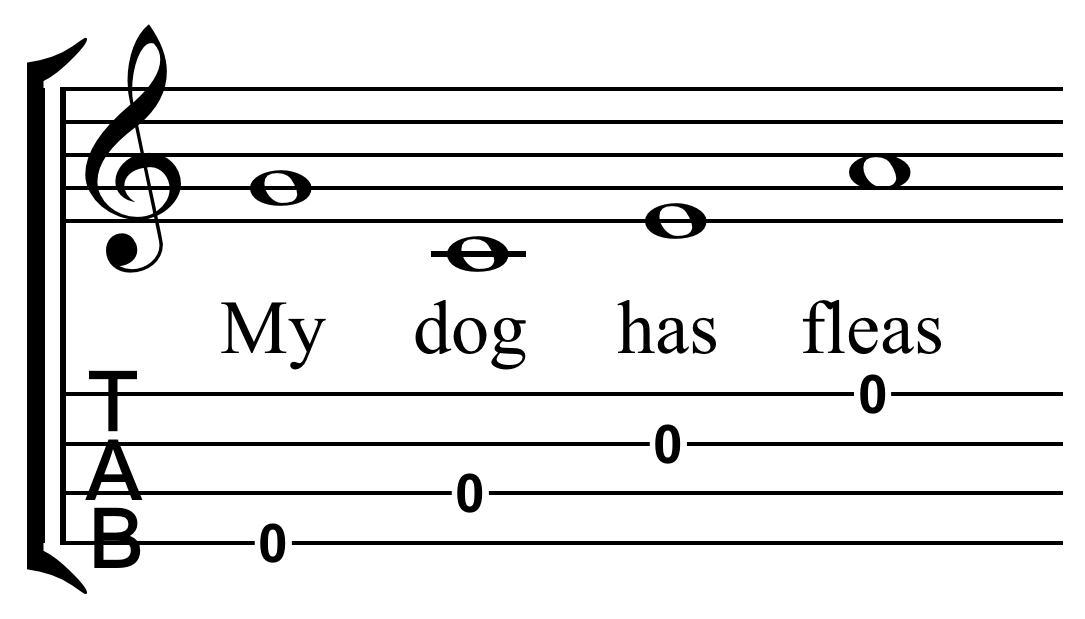
"My dog has fleas" tuning

In terms of overall construction, banjo ukuleles parallel banjos, though on a smaller scale. They are always fretted. Most are built of wood with metal accoutrements, although the mid-century "Dixie" brand featured banjo ukuleles made from solid metal.

The banjo ukulele neck typically has sixteen frets, and is the same scale length as a soprano or, less commonly, concert or tenor-sized ukulele. Banjo ukuleles may be open-backed, or may incorporate a resonator.

Banjo ukulele heads were traditionally made of calf skin, but most modern instruments are fitted with synthetic heads. Some players prefer the natural skin heads for a more traditional tone. Tightening or loosening the drum head, through adjusting the tension hooks fitted around the outside of the drum, results in a change in tone. The head typically has a firm tension. Tightening it so that it is rock hard to the touch gives a bright sound with good note distinction, but less bass response. Loosening it so it is softer, yet still tight enough to keep the bridge in place with the tension of the strings, results in a warmer, less bright sound. The bridge floats on the head and is held in place by the tension of the strings.

Like standard ukuleles, banjo ukuleles were originally outfitted with gut strings. Nylon strings are now typically used, sometimes with a wound third string.

The banjolele is commonly tuned G_{4} C_{4} E_{4} A_{4} ("C Tuning", same as the soprano or standard ukulele) or A_{4} D_{4} F^{♯}_{4} B_{4} ("D Tuning"), with a re-entrant 4th string. The A–D–F♯–B tuning often produces a more strident tone, and is used for this reason. Both of these tunings are known as "my dog has fleas" tunings (fifth, tonic, major third, major sixth). Bass Banjo Ukeleles exist and are typically tuned E_{1}A_{1}D_{2}G_{2} (same as the contrabass ukulele).

== Popular culture ==
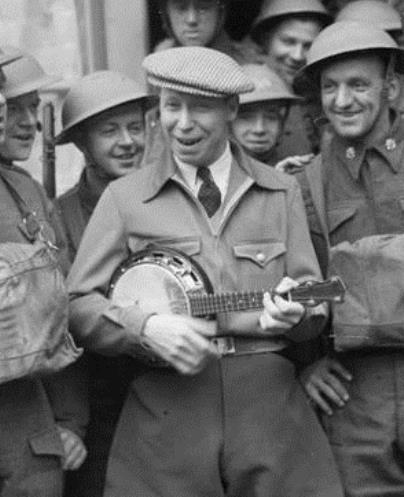
British musician George Formby with his trademark banjo ukulele, entertaining British troops in France, 1940

The banjo ukulele was the instrument played by British comedian George Formby (1904–1961), who developed his own style of playing in accompaniment to his comic songs. His name is associated with the instrument more than that of any other musician.

Other artists to make eminent use of the banjolele were Wendell Hall and Roy Smeck in the United States, and Billy "Uke" Scott in Great Britain.

In P.G. Wodehouse's 1934 novel Thank You, Jeeves, valet Jeeves is driven to resign over his employer Bertie Wooster's decision to take up the banjolele.

Queen member Brian May used a banjo ukulele in the song "Bring Back That Leroy Brown", which appeared on their third album Sheer Heart Attack. He also used one to compose "Good Company" for their album A Night at the Opera, although on the recording he used a regular ukulele.

George Harrison favored the instrument in his later years, using it in several recordings. For example, he played it on his song "Any Road".

Recent users of the banjo ukulele have included Jeff Claus of The Horse Flies, Alan Randall, Andy Eastwood, comedian Frank Skinner, Mr. B The Gentleman Rhymer, and Steven Universe creator Rebecca Sugar. The instrument can be heard in the theme song to the television show Arrested Development.

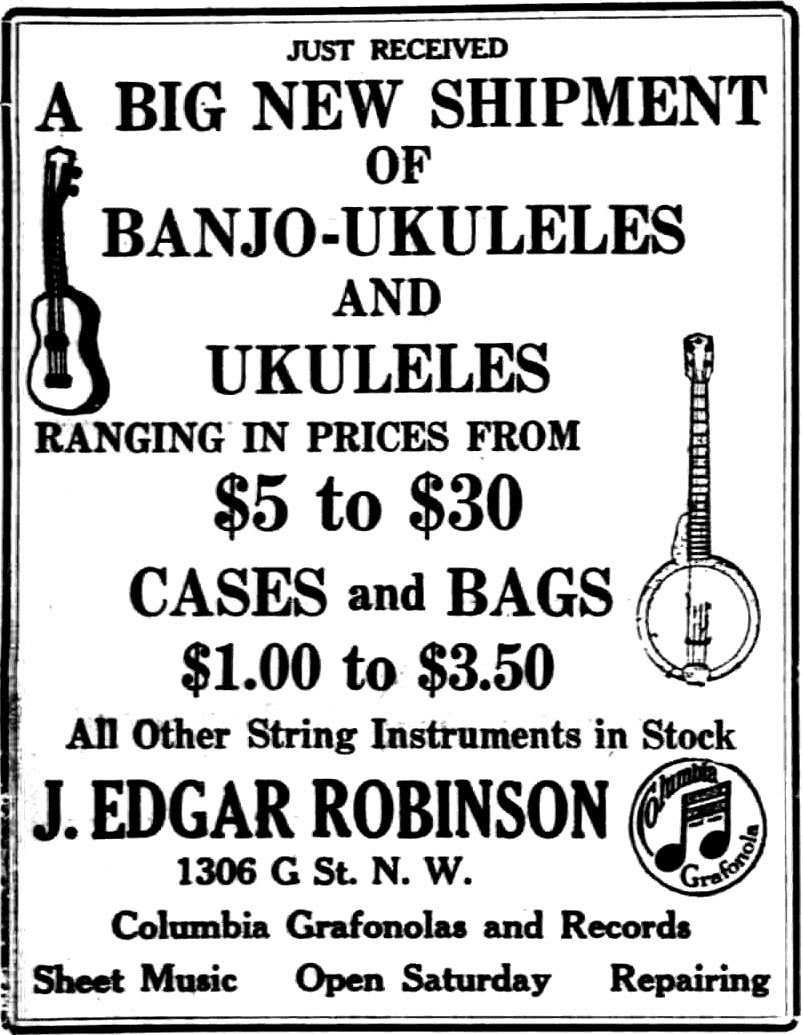
“Just received a big new shipment of banjo-ukuleles and ukuleles ranging in prices from $5 to $30 cases and bags. $1.00 to $3.50 all other string instruments in stock.” “J. Edgar Robinson” - From a 1919 ad in Washington Times

== Notable manufacturers ==
Historical manufacturers

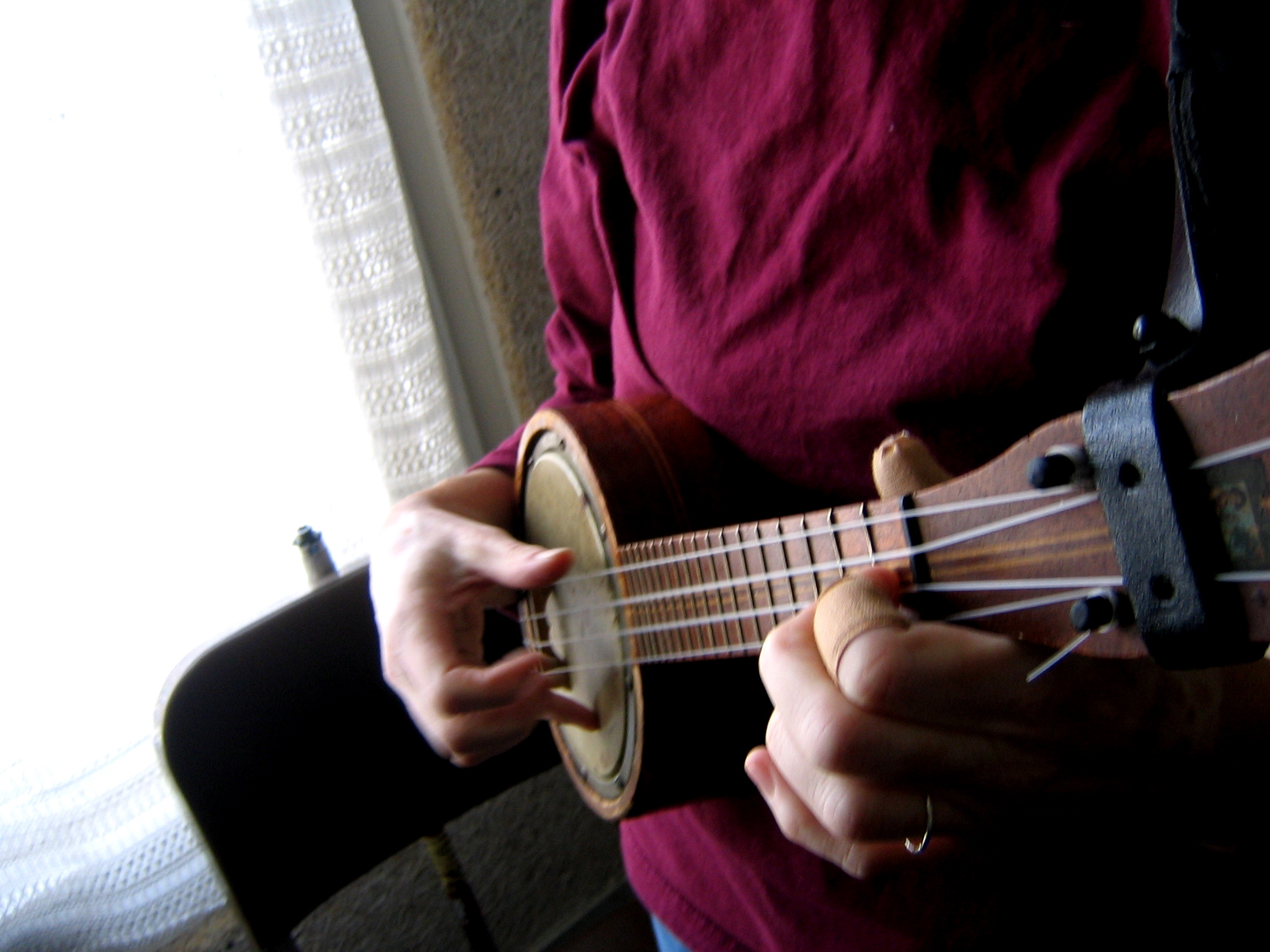

- Gibson Guitar Corporation
- John Grey & Sons
- Kay/Stromberg-Voisinet
- Ludwig
- Slingerland Drum Company
- Deering Banjo Company

Current manufacturers

- Harley Benton
- Luna Guitars
- The Magic Fluke Company
- Oscar Schmidt Inc.
- Recording King

== See also ==
- Banjo Mandolin
- Cümbüş, a similar Turkish instrument
