= Sutton Grammar School =

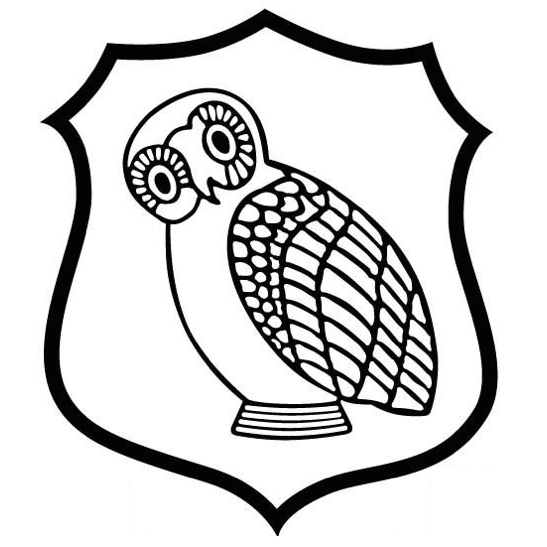
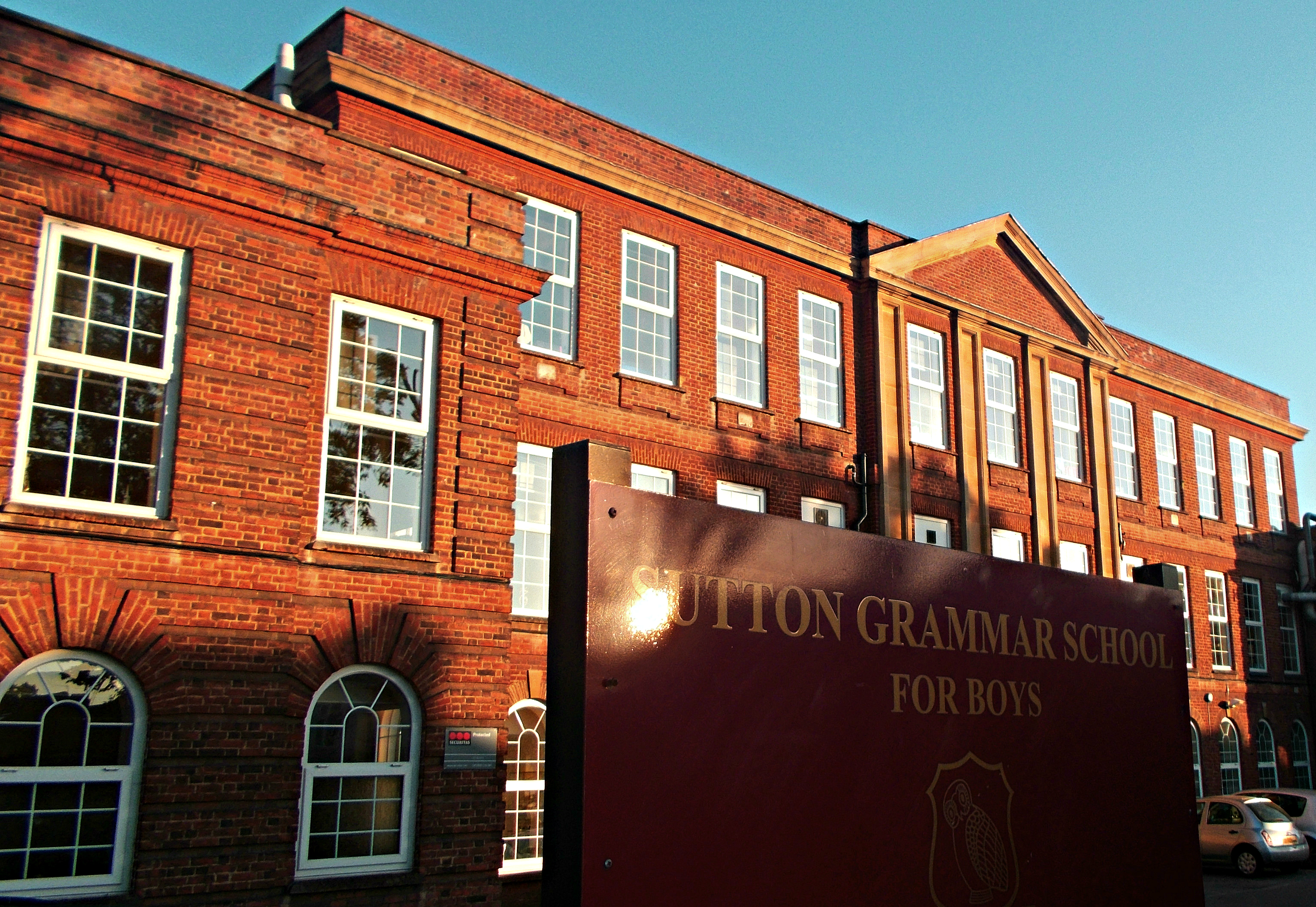
- School crest Main entrance of Sutton Grammar School

Location
- Manor Lane; Sutton, London, SM1 4AS; England; 51.36509°N 0.18974°W

Information
- Type: Grammar school, academy
- Mottoes: Keep Faith; Floreat Suttona (Latin: "May Sutton flourish")
- Established: 1899
- Department for Education URN: 136787 Tables
- Ofsted: Reports
- Head Teacher: Ben Cloves
- Gender: Boys
- Age: 11 to 18
- Enrolment: 1,030 (2024)
- Houses: Manor, Warwick, Greyhound, Lenham, Throwley
- Colour
- Publication: The Suttonian
- Alumni: Old Suttonians ("OSs")
- Website: Sutton Grammar School

Sutton Grammar School (formerly Sutton Grammar School for Boys) is an 11–18 boys selective state grammar school located in South London. The school's main site is in Sutton and its playing fields are in neighbouring Cheam, Surrey. In 2022, a total of 1,034 students were enrolled at Sutton Grammar School, with 355 enrolled in the co–educational sixth form provision at the school.

Sutton Grammar School converted to become an academy school in May 2011.

As of 2025, the school is now enrolling year 7 forms of 30 pupils, rather than 27 in previous years, so will have a total enrolment of 1105 students by 2029, including approximately 360 in the co-educational sixth form.

== History ==
=== Establishment ===
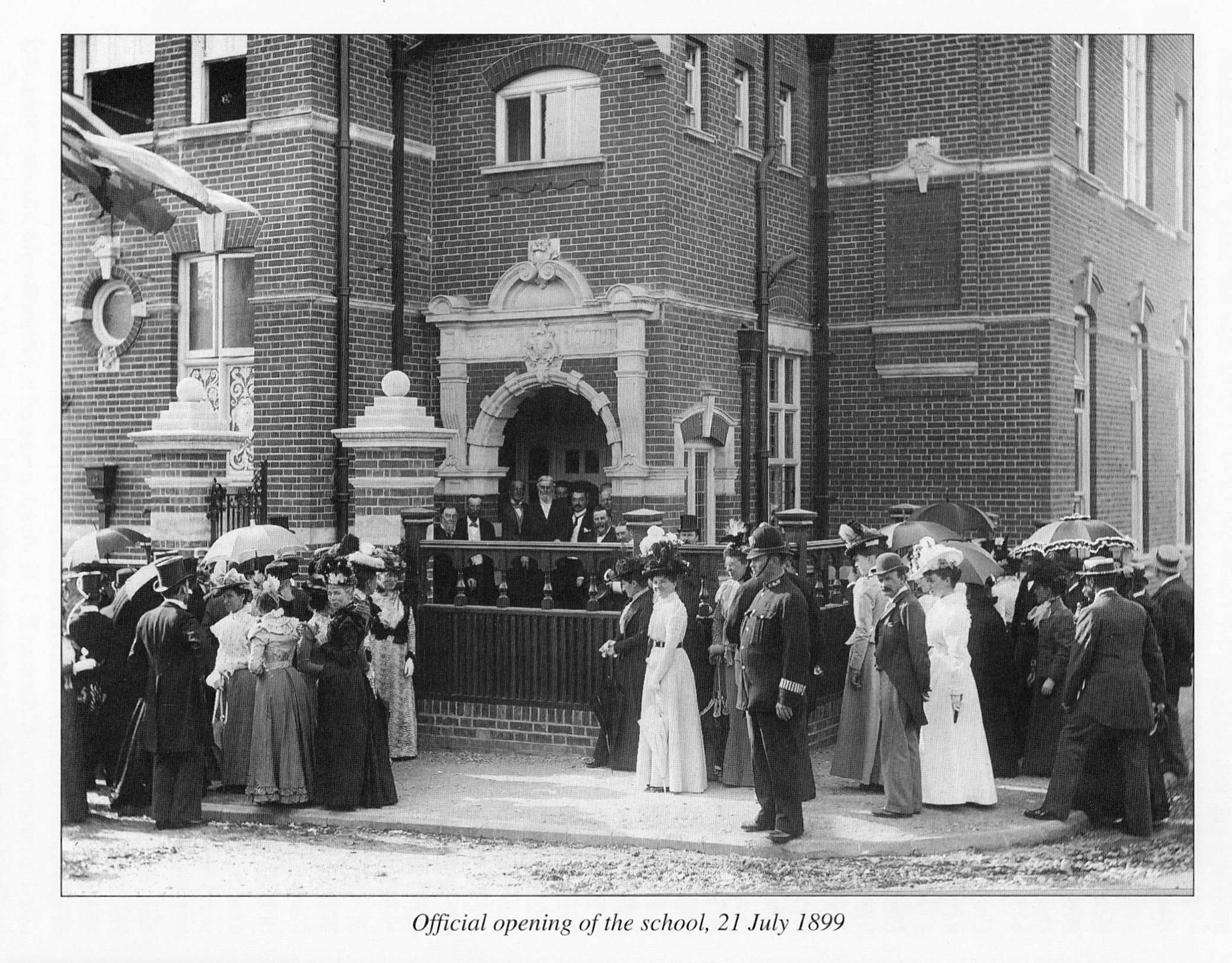
Official opening of the school on 21 July 1899

The school has undergone several name changes; it used to be known as Sutton County Grammar School, Sutton Manor School (owing to its proximity with the old Sutton Manor) and more recently Sutton Grammar School for Boys.

The first headmaster of the school was E H Hensley, who read mathematics at Cambridge University and became a wrangler by achieving a first class degree. The first Second Master (or Deputy Headmaster) was L A Valencia, who read Classics at Cambridge University.

The school was founded on a site between Throwley Way and the High Street in Sutton, and officially opened in a ceremony on 21 July 1899. The main building was opened in 1928 on Manor Lane, directly opposite Manor Park in Sutton.

The Sutton School Song was composed in 1935 by the chairman of the governors, Courtenay Gale, and the words were written by a Mr Horn, a classics master, with the school motto, "Floreat Suttona" (Latin: "May Sutton flourish"), as the refrain. In 1954, however, "Keep Faith" was adopted as a new motto, with "Floreat Suttona" being used only occasionally, for example, as a sign off in communiqués to old boys of the school (known as "Old Suttonians").

=== Recent history ===
Since 1 June 2011, the school has had academy status, and its name formally changed from Sutton Grammar School for Boys to Sutton Grammar School, although it remains a selective grammar school for boys. From September 2017, however, it began accepting applications from girls to join the sixth form.

The current headmaster is B Cloves, who joined in 2019. His predecessor, G D Ironside, was headmaster of the school for 29 years. The deputy headmistress is a Mrs Ross who joined in 2018.

The current Senior Leadership Team includes: Mr B Cloves (Headmaster), Mrs K Ross(Snr Dpt Head, Dsg Safeguarding Lead, Pastoral Lead), Mr J Costello (Dpt Head), Mr S Brook (Asst Head), Mr C Robson (Asst Head, Head of Sixth Form, DDSL), Mrs N Bennett (Director of Finance & Operations) and Mr R Murrill (Chair of the Governing Body).

Other leadership posts are held by: Mr A Marsh (Head of Upper School, DDSL), Mrs L McDonald (HY13), Mr O Green (HY12), Mr A Heasman (HY9), Mr J Bird (HY8), Mr C Roy (HY7), Ms M Mahmoud (SENDCO), Mr J Tuck (Asst SENDCO) and Mr A Blunt (Head of PE & Games, DDSL).

The school is divided into three sections – the Lower School (years 7–9), the Upper School (years 10 and 11) and the Sixth Form (Lower Sixth and Upper Sixth) – each of which attracts its own dress code. Uniform consists of a maroon blazer with a house tie in the Lower School, a black blazer with a house tie in the Upper School and a lounge suit and tie of the pupil's choice in the Sixth Form.

The school operates a prefect system with a head student, three deputy head students, senior prefects and part-time prefects from the Sixth Form.

== Overview ==
=== Academic and performance ===
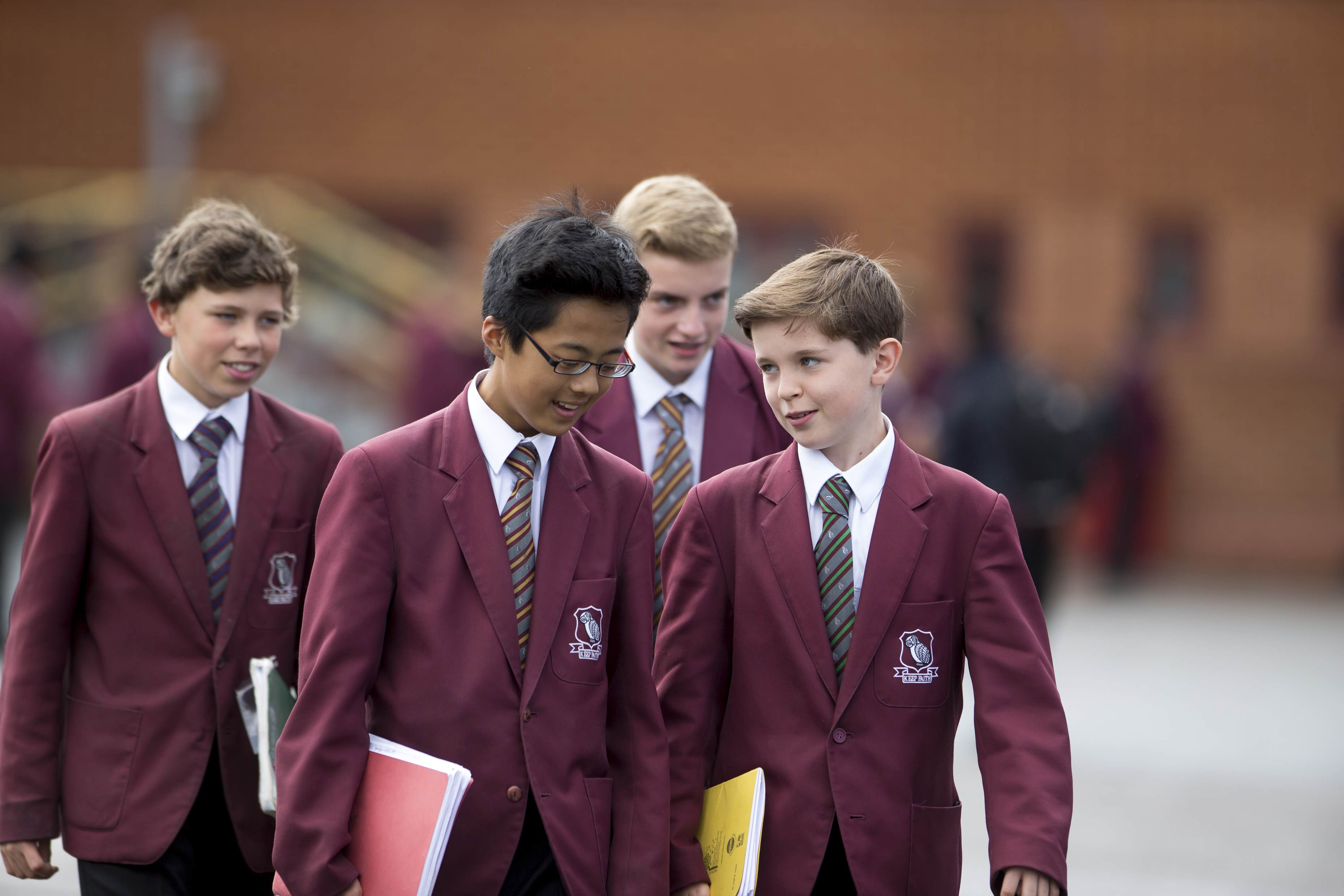
Boys of the lower school of Sutton Grammar School

The school is consistently ranked amongst the top schools in the country. It placed 13th out of all secondary schools in England in academic league tables in 2015, putting it in the top 0.05%. The school regularly features in The Sunday Times' list of the "Best secondary schools in London", placing seventh in 2020 and eleventh in 2023. It was named the 10th best state secondary school in London by The Sunday Times in 2022 and again in 2024.

In 2016, The Independent described the school as part of "a small group of elite feeder schools" in South East England that sends a disproportionate number of pupils to Oxbridge and contributes to a north-south bias in Oxbridge admissions. In 2016, for example, over 11% of all university places secured by pupils in the sixth form were at Oxbridge, with all Oxbridge applicants having successfully secured their place.

In 2017, The Sunday Times and The Independent featured the school in articles about the top schools in England that "eclipse Eton in ranking for A-level science", referring to a science, technology, engineering, and mathematics league table in which the school placed 12th in the country. In the same year, the school was nominated under the category "Science, technology and engineering teacher or team of the year" in the Times Educational Supplement Schools Awards 2017.

One of the school's pupils, Krtin Nithiyanandam, received international press coverage in 2015 after he developed a test for Alzheimer's disease and autism aged 15, for which he was awarded the Scientific American Innovator Award in 2015. He again received widespread press coverage in 2016 after he discovered a way to make deadly triple negative breast cancer more treatable. He conducted this research in the school's laboratories. The Guardian named him alongside Sasha Obama (daughter of Barack and Michelle Obama) and Brooklyn Beckham (son of David and Victoria Beckham) in its "teen power list" of 2016, and profiled him as a "rising star of 2017".

=== Houses ===
Upon entry to the school, boys are allocated to one of five forms, each form being associated with one of the five houses:

- – Manor
- – Warwick
- – Greyhound
- – Lenham
- – Throwley

If a pupil has a brother already at the school, he is ordinarily placed in the same house as his brother upon entry. The names of the houses represent the four boundary roads of the existing school site and the road upon which the school was originally founded just a short distance away (Throwley Road). These names were suggested in 2017 by head of geography and Old Suttonian R Pletts to replace the houses of Blue, Brown, Green and Red, previously Scott, Drake, Nelson and Hood which had been in existence since 1920 and had themselves replaced the original houses of North, South, East and West.

==== House Shield ====
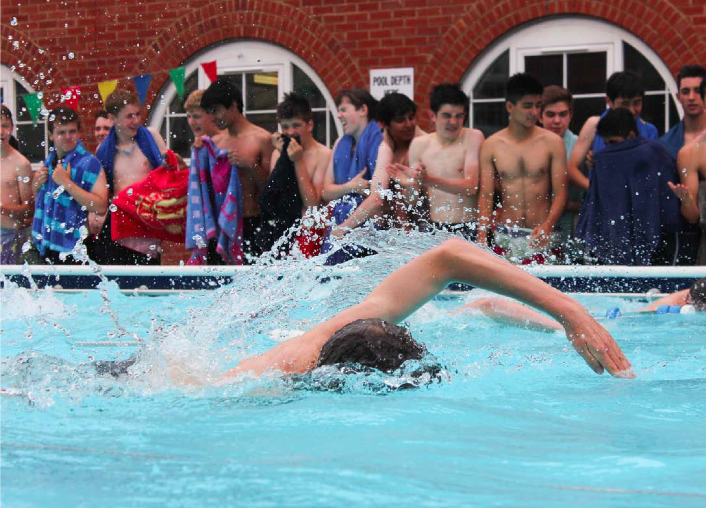
Boys competing in House Swimming as part of the House Shield competition

The House Shield is a competition based on house points, awarded for academic and sporting achievement. As part of the House Shield, the following events are held each year:

- House art
- House athletics
- House charity
- House chess
- House cricket
- House cross-country
- House counterstrike
- House cubing
- House drama (Lower School)
- House dodgeball
- House football
- House gymnastics
- House handball
- House humanities mastermind
- House maths
- House music
- House photography
- House physics olympiad
- House poetry
- House points
- House rackets
- House raffle ticket sales
- House table tennis
- House trade fair

==== House captains ====
Each year, the house masters appoint house captains, secretaries and occasionally vice-captains, who lead pupils in pastoral activities throughout the year. Many address pupils during assemblies, help to organise sports teams, lead the warm-up lap in opening the annual house athletics championship and, at the end of their tenure, help to select their successor. They are assisted by a secretary and occasionally a vice-captain.

=== In popular culture ===
Scenes for the Hollywood film Black Sea, starring Jude Law and directed by Kevin Macdonald, were shot outside the school on 1 August 2013. Law appears in the scenes getting in and out of a car whilst pupils walk out of the school in the background.

Fictional music character Mr.B The Gentleman Rhymer, who performs "chap hop" (hip-hop delivered in a Received Pronunciation accent), is described as having attended the school by his creator, Jim Burke, a British parodist.

A prank played by pupils at the school attracted national press coverage, including from The Sun, and generated online debate in 2009. Pupils moved numerous bricks onto the roof of the main building to spell out the word "cock" in large letters, which was spotted on Google Earth.

A photograph of Sutton Grammar School students appeared on the thumbnail of a YouTube video titled "Americans React to British vs American Education Systems," released on March 2, 2024. The video discusses differences between the American and British educational systems.

=== Admissions ===
The school is selective, requiring pupils to pass an eleven plus examination in order to gain admission. In 2013, The Telegraph ranked it third in a list of the most oversubscribed schools in England, describing it as part of "an elite group of grammar schools...with more than a thousand applications". The school sells mock entrance examinations to parents of prospective pupils, which generated an income of £70,000 in 2016.

5 News broadcast a report on the school in 2016, interviewing headmaster G D Ironside and pupils and covering issues including elitism and life at the school.

The school admits pupils from ages 11–18, or years 7–13 in the English academic system, although the majority of students join the school in year 7 or year 12. There are 140 pupils in each year in the Lower School (years 7–9) and Upper School (years 10 and 11), and slightly more in the sixth form, varying year-on-year.

=== Combined Cadet Force ===
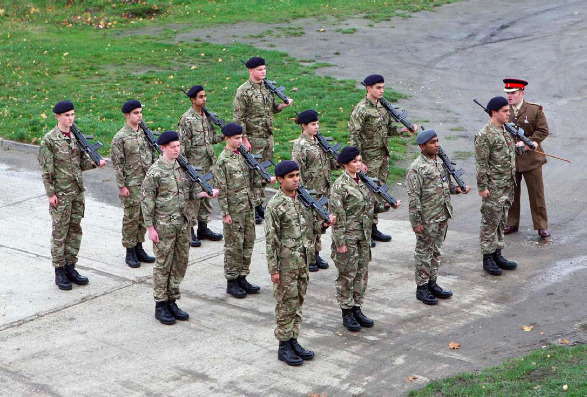
Cadets of the school CCF

The school's Combined Cadet Force was raised in early 1915 and officially recognised by the War Office in June 1915. Over the years, boys from the school’s CCF have both served and fought for their country in successive campaigns and wars. In the school's main building, the World War I memorial lists the names of the 80 boys and one master who died during the war. More recently, a World War II memorial was built at the Walch Memorial Playing Fields. It was constructed from 114 stones cemented together in a cairn, each representing a single former pupil who died during the war, and each collected and carried down from over 100 peaks in the United Kingdom. On 15 November 2015, a dedication ceremony was conducted by Old Suttonian Jack Noble and attended by staff, former staff, cadets, former cadets, parents and old boys. A guard of honour was held, executed by year 11 and upper sixth cadets under the command of Old Suttonian serving officers, and the names of the dead were read, as well as the Laurence Binyon poem, "For the Fallen".

The officer team of the CCF is headed by David Hobbs, an ex-head cadet and ex-head boy. The CCF is under the leadership of this officer team and an annually appointed cadet corporal major (army section) and cadet warrant officer (RAF section) from the ranks of the sixth form cadets. The head of the RAF section has long been Giles Peter Benedict Marshall, a teacher at the school. In the late 1990s, sponsored by the Blues and Royals of the Household Cavalry, the army section of the CCF began to admit girls from Nonsuch High School for Girls and, in 2007, the RAF section followed suit. The CCF celebrated its centenary in 2016 at the Royal Air Force Club, a London gentlemen's club. As of 2016, the CCF is the most popular extracurricular activity at the school, with around 300 cadets from year 9 to Upper Sixth from both the school and Nonsuch High School for Girls. The Old Suttonians Cadet Association, which is affiliated to the Old Suttonians Association, enables ex-cadets to stay in contact with each other.

=== School grounds ===
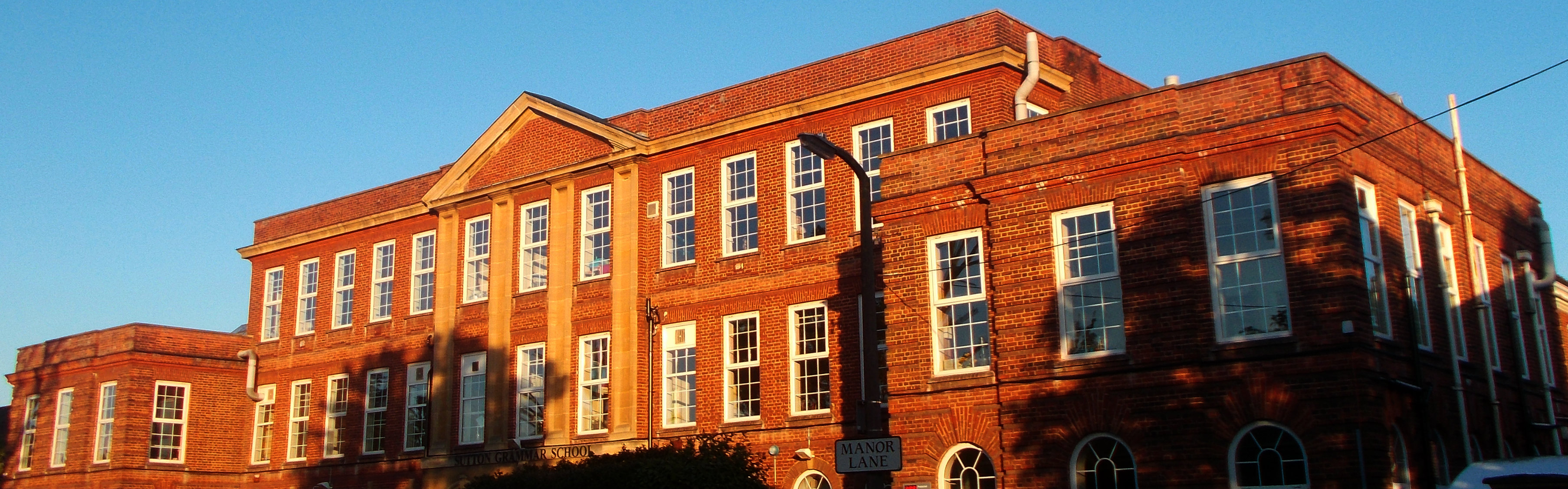
Main school building

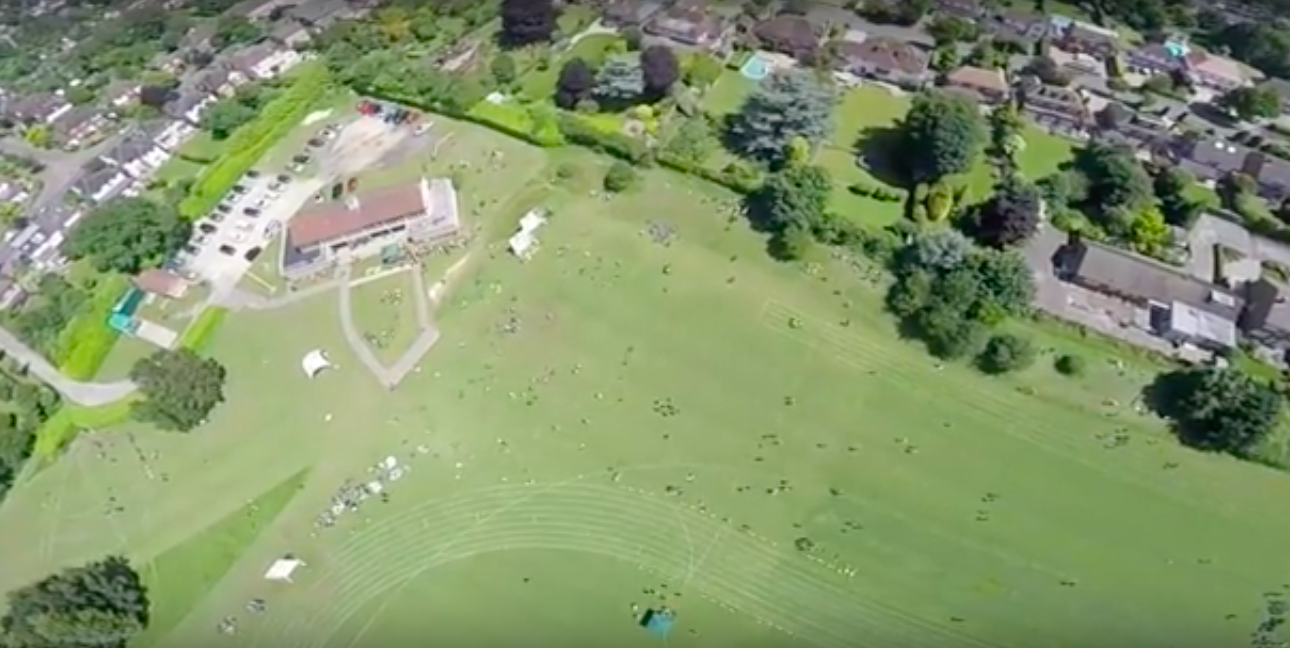
Aerial view of the pavilion

The school is located in Sutton and its playing fields are located in neighbouring Cheam. There has recently been extensive building work carried out to expand the main site.

The main site consists of the following:

- Main building: Oldest school building, until recently featuring original Victorian panelled windows. Includes the school hall, multiple science laboratories, English classrooms, an RE classroom and a drama studio. Contains a World War I memorial, listing the names of the 81 boys and one master who died during the war.
- Library: Large building containing fiction, non-fiction and reference books. Overseen by a 2 adult librarians and some part-time student librarians. Contains computers for academic use.
- Dining hall: Recently completed in 2016 to replace the old canteen. Extends into the sixth form building.
- Sports hall: Opened in July 2005 at a cost of £1.1m by Sir Bobby Robson, who helped fund part of the hall and whose grandson attended the school. Contains numerous sports facilities and modern foreign language classrooms.
- Swimming pool: Outdoor, semi-heated pool. (Closed as of 2024 due to costs to keep it running.)
- Humanities building: Contains computer science and history classrooms as well as one of the school's two drama studios.
- Music and design technology building: Contains a music classroom, soundproof music practice rooms and two DT rooms (containing an IT suite, practical workshop with heavy machinery and design suite).
- Mathematics building: Newly built for the academic year commencing in 2012, housing six new classrooms primarily used for mathematics.
- Sixth form building: Newly built in 2015, housing geography, art, politics, business, RE and psychology classrooms. The sixth form centre is made up of the IT room, boardroom, study room and common room on the top floor.

The Walch Memorial Playing Fields are located off Northey Avenue, Cheam, and typically referred to by pupils and staff at the school as "Northey". They are extensive off-site grounds to which pupils are transported a short distance in the school coach or minibuses. They consist of the following:

- Pavilion: Overlooking the playing fields, this building contains the school bar and an events room on the upper floor (predominantly used for Old Suttonians Association events, leavers' events and Sports Day), as well as sports changing rooms and a small shop on the ground floor. Nearby stands a World War II memorial, commemorating over 100 former pupils who died during the war.
- Sports fields: Contains football and rugby pitches, cricket fields, an athletics track, long/triple jump sandpits and a cross-country course.

== Extracurricular activities ==
=== Sports ===
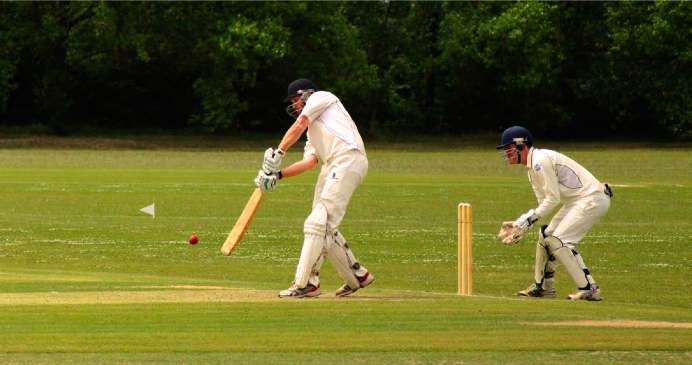
Cricket 1st XI vs MCC

The school offers the following sports:

- Athletics
- Badminton
- Basketball
- Cricket
- Cross-country
- Fitness training
- Football
- Gymnastics
- Pickleball (new markings on main playground now)
- Rowing (indoor)
- Rugby
- Table tennis
- Tennis
- Volleyball

The school has a strong tradition of providing ballboys for the Wimbledon tennis championships. In 2016, the rugby 1st XV finished runner-up in the Emerging Schools League. and the school won the Borough Cross-country competition. Until recently, patball – a hand and ball game said to have been invented at Dulwich College and borrowing from other sports such as Eton Fives – was popular at the school. The decline in patball's popularity within the school can be attributed to year groups being assigned separate sections of the playground as part of COVID-19 restrictions.

=== Societies ===
There are various active societies within the school, including:

- Art club
- Anime and manga club
- Board Games club
- CanSat
- Chess club
- Combined Cadet Force (CCF)
- Choir (a capella choir, junior choir and senior choir)
- Chemistry
- Cubing club
- Debating
- Drama
- Duke of Edinburgh's Award
- Fantasy football club
- History society
- Jazz band
- Law society
- Muslim prayers
- Orchestra
- Philosophy society
- Photography club
- Money and economics society (TMES)
- Scrabble club
- VEX Robotics
- Young Enterprise

Choral, orchestral, musical theatre and drama productions are often held in conjunction with Sutton High School for Girls. Recent productions include High School Musical, The Comedy of Errors, Grease, Loserville, The Wedding Singer, Sweet Charity, Oklahoma!, West Side Story and The Murder in the Red Barn.

In 2017, the school won the Big Voice Mooting Competition, which was adjudicated by Brian Kerr, Baron Kerr of Tonaghmore and held at the UK Supreme Court. In the same year, the school finished runner-up in The Times/Kingsley Napley Student Advocacy Competition, which was adjudicated by Anne Rafferty and Max Hill and held at the headquarters of The Times.

In 2016, the school finished runner-up in the national finals of the Young Enterprise competition, held at the Emirates Stadium – a competition in which it has often enjoyed success.

=== Other ===
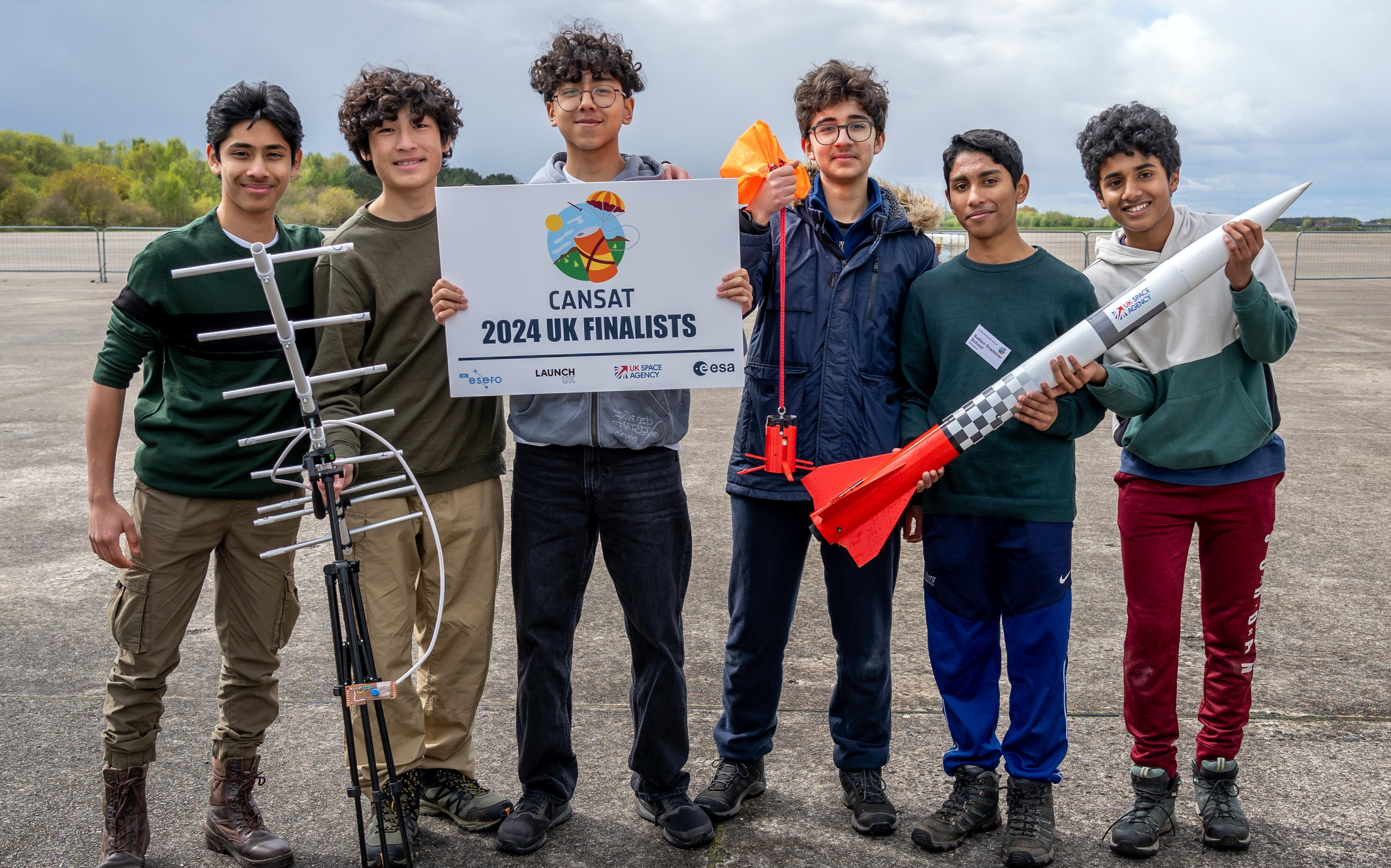
Team Athena at the UK CanSat finals, post-launch

In 2024, which was the first year in which the school entered the competition, the Year 10 team (Team Athena) from the school made it to the finals of the UK CanSat competition by being in the top 10 out of 258 teams. In May the following year, the new Year 10 team (Team Noctua) came first place in the finals, winning the entire national competition.

In 2020, a pupil won the Manufacturing Technologies Association's Technology, Design and Innovation Challenge, a leading extracurricular competition for design and technology pupils in the UK, which is judged by a panel of industry figures representing MTA members. The pupil won the Best Overall prize in the 17-19 age category, an individual prize and funding for design and technology equipment for the school.

In 2019, pupils from the school won the 14–16 and 17–19 age categories of the Manufacturing Technologies Association Technology, Design and Innovation (TDI) Challenge at the European headquarters of Yamazaki Mazak Corporation. The winner of the 17–19 age category had previously won the 14–16 category for the school in 2016.

In 2017, a pupil was named Young Engineer of the Year by the Worshipful Company of Scientific Instrument Makers, a livery company of the City of London, and went on to represent Great Britain at the Intel International Science and Engineering Fair in Los Angeles. Previously, another pupil had also been named Young Engineer of the Year in 2011.

In 2016, the school won the international final of the Space Design Competition in the USA, having previously won the UK final. The school runs various domestic and international trips every year. Recent trips have included Washington, D.C., Normandy, the Rhineland, Spain, European battlefields, the Arctic Circle and numerous ski trips. There are various publications produced by pupils of the school and distributed within and outside the school's community, including the geography magazine Latitude 51°, the history magazine Retrospect, the biology magazine Life and the school magazine The Suttonian.

== Old Suttonians and Freemasonry ==
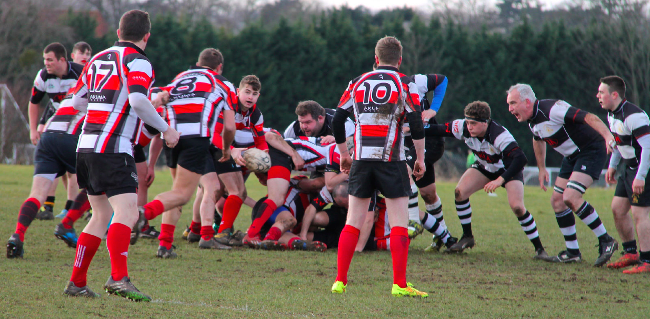
Old Suttonians Rugby 1st XV (red socks)

Old boys of the school are known as "Old Suttonians" (often abbreviated to "Old Sutts") and use the post-nominal letters "OS". The Old Suttonians Association is the membership group for old boys of the school.

The association was founded as the Old Suttonians Football Club in 1906, and soon after as the Old Suttonians Association in 1909. Both were formed by a master of the school, S A Birks. 2006, therefore, saw the one-hundredth anniversary of the Old Suttonians Football Club, whilst the association itself celebrated its centenary in 2009. The Old Suttonians Cadet Association marked its tenth anniversary in the same year.

The Association runs an annual reunion dinner in September of each year and, on a more intermittent basis, reunions for the various year groups, most recently for those at the school under the headmastership of E H Hensley or J A Cockshutt. In 2015, a lunch was held at the Royal Air Force Club to mark G D Ironside's 25th anniversary as headmaster, at which many Old Suttonians were present.

Subscribing Old Suttonians receive a copy of the school's annual publication, The Suttonian.

There are seven clubs affiliated to the Association:

- The Cowdray Club (named after Weetman Pearson, 1st Viscount Cowdray GCVO PC, who gifted the permanent home of the Royal Air Force Club, a London gentlemen's club)
- The Old Suttonians Basketball Club
- The Old Suttonians Cadet Association
- The Old Suttonians Cricket Club
- The Old Suttonians Football Club
- The Old Suttonians Rugby Football Club
- The Old Suttonians Scuba Club

In its lifetime, the Old Suttonians Association has had a very diverse range of affiliated activities attached to it. A literary and debating society, a cycling and rambling club, chess and bridge clubs, and a very strong swimming club were all in evidence at some point during the period 1909–1970.

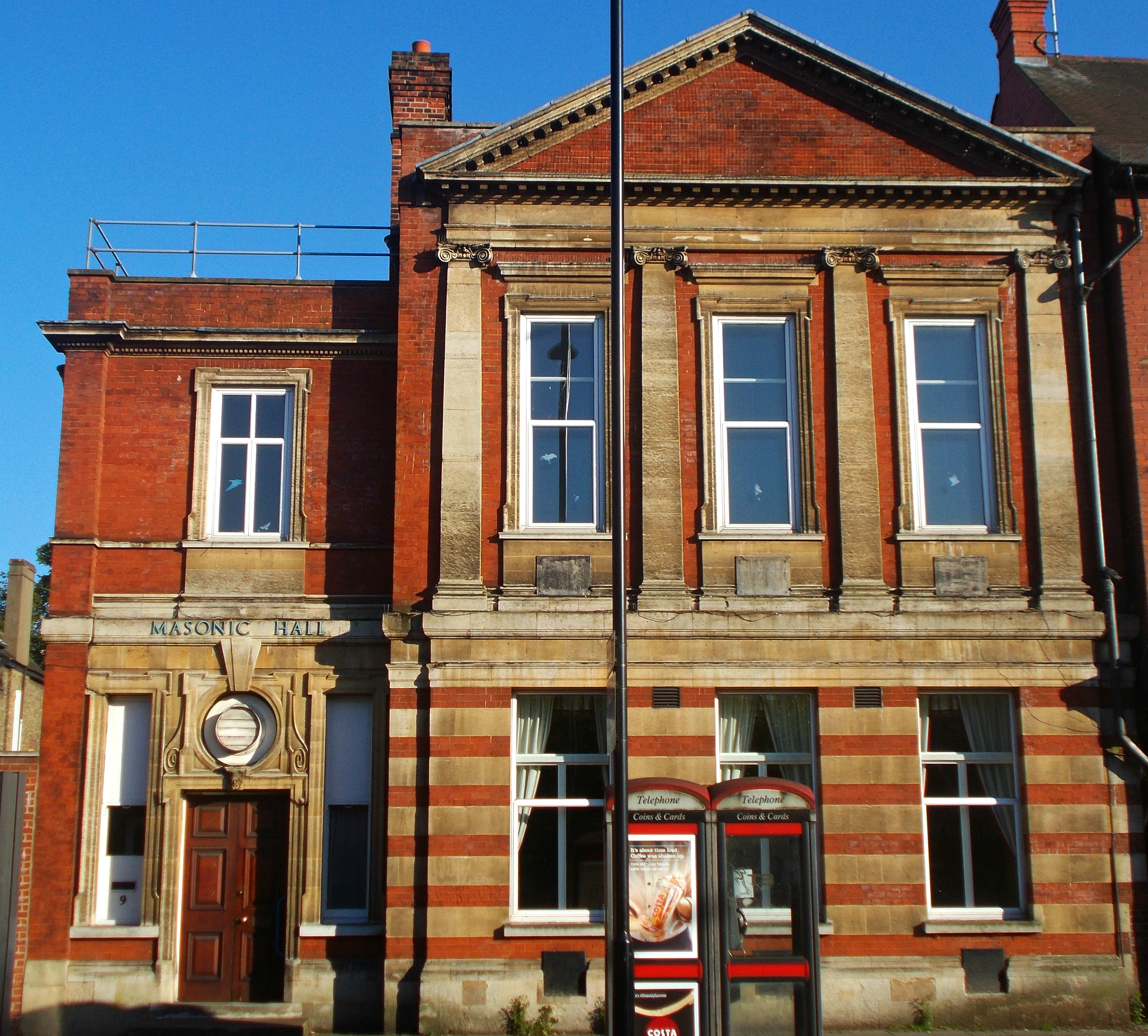
Sutton Masonic Hall

The school has links to Freemasonry, specifically the Athene Lodge, which meets at Sutton Masonic Hall. The lodge typically publishes a report in the school's annual publication, The Suttonian, with updates on the activities of the lodge and information for pupils and Old Suttonians considering joining.

The lodge was established by a group of Old Suttonians who met in 1931 to consider forming a masonic lodge to meet in Sutton. On 25 January 1932, a petition bearing 23 signatures was forwarded to the Provincial Grand Master of Surrey, requesting approval from the Grand Master to grant a warrant of constitution to form a regular lodge to meet under the name "Athena" in reference to the close association to the school. (References are made to Athena, the Greek goddess of wisdom, in The Sutton School Song.) On 10 February 1932, news was received that the Provincial Grand Master, Charles, Prince of Wales, had approved the petition and it had been sent to the Grand Secretary of the United Grand Lodge of England. On 2 March 1932, a new warrant was issued under the slightly amended name of "Athene" and arrangements were put in place for the consecration ceremony to take place at Mark Masons' Hall, London, on 10 May 1932. Then-headmaster of the school, J A Cockshutt, was invested as Senior Warden of the Lodge.

In the following years, through loans and donations, Athene Lodge became a Hall Stone Lodge and then a Patron Lodge of the Royal Masonic Hospital in 1939. After World War II, information was received that the contract for the purchase of the Sutton Masonic Hall had been signed and exchanged, and the lodge contributed 300 guineas to become a shareholder. At a meeting on 17 December 1949, it was reported that a petition had been signed for a warrant of constitution for a Royal Arch Chapter to be attached to the lodge. At the following meeting in February 1950, it was reported that the petition had been approved by the Supreme Grand Chapter and the new Athene Chapter was consecrated on 9 May 1950.

The lodge of instruction, which was sanctioned by the lodge at the first meeting after consecration, met at the school for the first 25 years.
