= Grand Northern Ukulele Festival =

The Grand Northern Ukulele Festival (GNUF) was a UK-based ukulele festival which took place annually between 2013 and 2023. It was established in 2013 and has been the recipient of the Queen's Award for Voluntary Service. It was also given the Best Ukulele Festival award from UKE Magazine.

== Festival organisation ==
GNUF is a volunteer-run festival that isnot-for-profit. GNUF was built on three key principles: making things, making connections and sharing knowledge.

In 2014, George Hinchliffe of the Ukulele Orchestra of Great Britain described, the festival as "truly amazing".

The festival works with local businesses who bring their wares and skills to the festival.

== Festival dates and headliners ==
Festival	Date	Notable Performers
10th	June 2023	U3 featuring Cynthia Lin, PPNOU, Dead Mans Uke, Hedge Inspectors, Phil Doleman, Washboard Resonators, Biskee Brisht, Peter Luongo, Dublin Ukulele Collective,
9th	June 2022	Taimane, Jake Shimabukuro, Andy Eastwood, Tricity Vogue All Girl Swing Band, Dublin Ukulele Collective, PPNOU
8th	June 2020	An Online Sideshow - Covid restrictions meant that we had to move online so we built an international collaborative performance https://northernuke.com/gnuf-2020-an-online-sideshow/
7th	May 2019	Jake Shimabukuro, Craig Chee, Sarah Maisel, Heidi Swedberg, Daniel Ward,
6th	May 2018	Mr. B The Gentleman Rhymer, Andy Eastwood performing an original composition with the Didsbury String Quartet, Andrew Molina, Hot Potato Syncopators, Peter Luongo
5th	May 2017	Victoria Vox, Andy Eastwood, Elof & Wamberg, Amelia Coburn, Eat-my-uke
4th	May 2016	Danielle Anderson (aka Danielle Ate the Sandwich), Hope & Social, The Quiet American, Samantha Muir, FU*K (Fagersta Ukulele Klub), Biscuithead and the Biscuit Badgers
3rd	June 2015	The Quiet American, Sarah Maisel & Craig Chee, Ben Rouse,
2nd	October 2014	Andy Eastwood, The Ukulele Orchestra of Great Britain, Del Rey, Zoë Bestel
1st	September 2013	Manitoba Hal, Ukulele Uff & Lonesome Dave, Yan Yalego, Phil Doleman

== Festival team ==
The festival producer and director is Mary Agnes Krell. She has worked in the UK and the US in performance, media and higher education. Though from the US, she is based in the UK and runs the festival in her spare time.

Robert Collins, a ukulele luthier based in North Tyneside is the co-director, and a founding member of the festival team. His responsibilities include the development of "making" workshops.

Robin Evans joined the festival team in 2017 and has acted in as artist liaison and in a festival outreach role.

Simon Taylor, from Farnborough, Hampshire also joined in 2017, a proponent of ukulele music via his Cool Cat Ukes website and activities, competitions brought to the GNUF event.

== Awards ==
Year	Award	Result
2019	Duke of York Community Initiative Award	Award Recipient
2018	Epic Award for England from Voluntary Arts	Won
2017	The Queen's Award for Voluntary Service	Won
2017	UKE Magazine BEST UKULELE FESTIVAL	Won
