= Lawrence Batley Theatre =

Theatre in Huddersfield, England

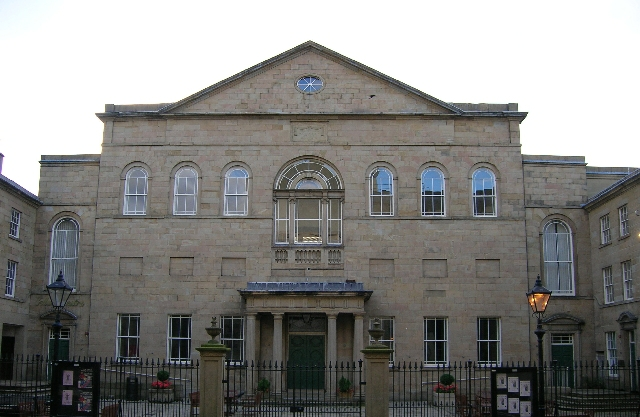
- Lawrence Batley Theatre
- Interactive map of Lawrence Batley Theatre
- Address: Queen's Square, Queen Street, Huddersfield HD1 2SP
- Coordinates: 53.645°N 1.780°W
- Seating type: Reserved seating

Construction
- Built: 1819

Website
- www.thelbt.org

Lawrence Batley Theatre is a theatre in Huddersfield, West Yorkshire, England which offers drama, music, dance and comedy.

The theatre is named after Lawrence Batley, a local entrepreneur and philanthropist, who founded a nationwide cash and carry chain. The building was originally built in 1819 as a Methodist chapel, called the Queen Street Chapel. The architect is unknown but the chief mason was Joseph Kaye, the man who was also responsible for Huddersfield station. It was opened on 9 July 1819 and the reporter in the Leeds Mercury described it as "one of the most handsome and commodious chapels in the kingdom; being capable of accommodating 3000 persons, and has been erected at an expense of from 8 to £10,000".

The chapel became a mission in 1906 until a decline in numbers saw the mission move out of the building in 1970 to a new building in King Street. In 1973 the building was converted into an arts centre; serious structural problems discovered by Kirklees Metropolitan Council in 1975 meant that the Arts Centre was rehoused on Venn Street, with the chapel building remaining vacant before being sublet to Novosquash Limited and converted into a squash club known as The Ridings. It also housed a restaurant and The Catacombs Disco.

In 1989 the Kirklees Theatre Trust was given the go ahead to save the building from deterioration and launch Huddersfield's newest theatre. Building work for the theatre started in September 1992 and took 4 years to complete.

== Notable events ==
- GNUF- a Grand Northern Ukulele Festival
- Shakespeare Schools Festival

== See also ==
- Listed buildings in Huddersfield (Newsome Ward - central area)
