= Professor Elemental =

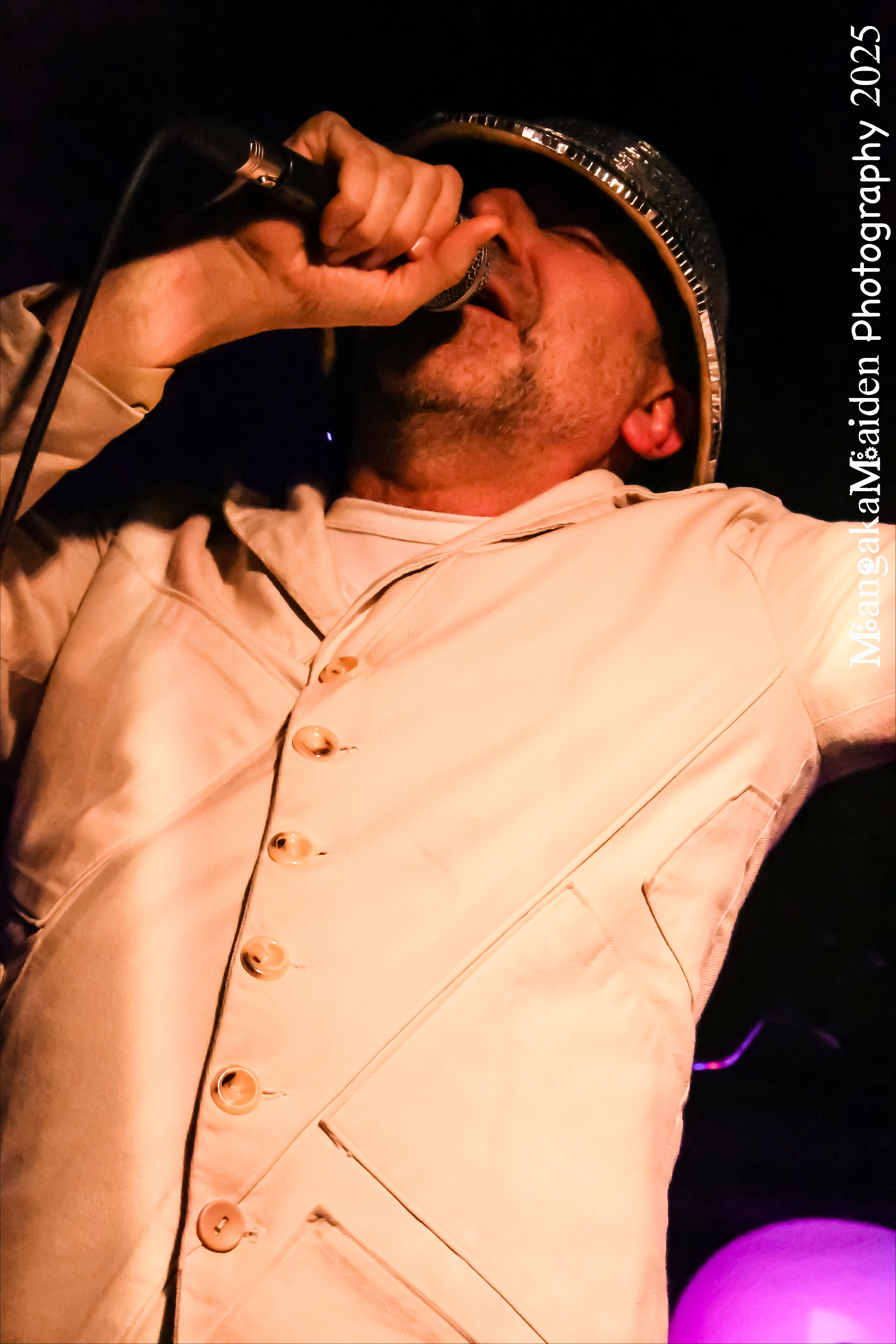
- Professor Elemental in 2025

Background information
- Origin: Ipswich, England
- Genre: Chap hop
- Occupations: Singer, songwriter
- Years active: 2005–present
- Label: Tea Sea (2009–present)
- Website: ProfessorElemental.com

Paul Alborough (born 1 June 1975), professionally known as Professor Elemental, is a chap hop musical artist.

== Career ==
Professor Elemental began his career as Emcee Elemental. The character of Professor Elemental arose from a planned concept album, which never came to fruition. Professor Elemental has since been seen performing as a solo act or in theatre acts such as Come into My Parlour. He is also popular at steampunk events and has been a headliner at the Steampunk World's Fair and the Waltz on the Wye.

Professor Elemental first gained attention with his music video for "Cup of Brown Joy" (directed by Moog Gravett), which got the attention of Warren Ellis. Since then he has released albums and performed live. He was in a friendly feud with fellow "chap-hop" artist Mr.B The Gentleman Rhymer, and eventually had a brief appearance in the latter's music video for "Just Like a Chap", of which Professor Elemental said, "much as I hate to admit it, I bloody love that video and am jolly glad [Mr.B] let me gate crash." Mr.B reciprocated with a cameo on Elemental's video for his song "I'm British" (which also features members of the Eccentric Club, of which Elemental is a member). Finally, the two battle rap on Elemental's 2012 song "The Duel", after which both agree that the other is "jolly good" at what they do.

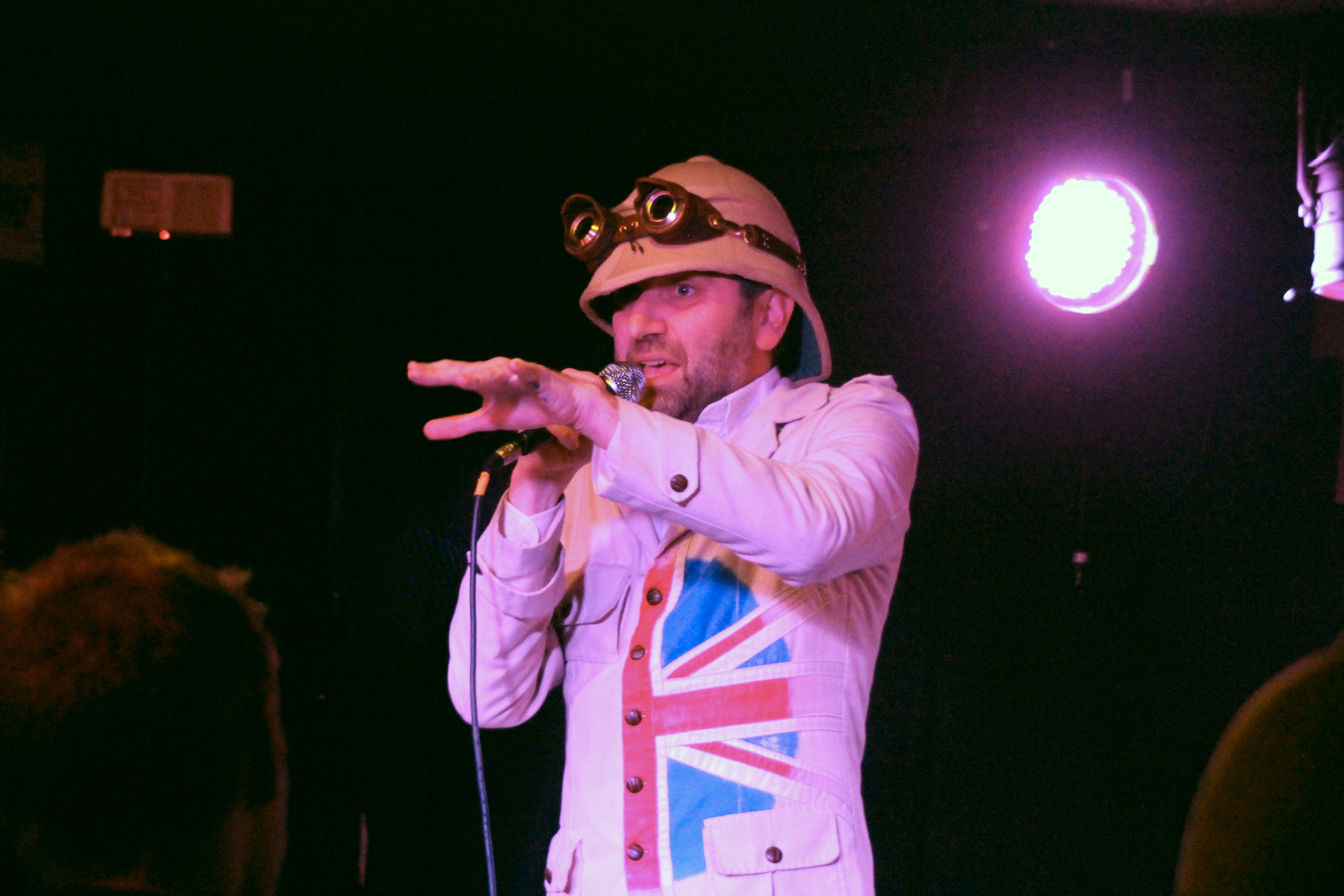
Elemental performing in 2015

The short film The Chronicles of Professor Elemental was successfully funded via Crowdfunder in 2012, raising £7,226 – with 155 supporters in 45 days. In the film, the professor is called on to find the statue of the golden frog. The 45-minute musical comedy was directed by Benjamin Field, starting Paul Alborough, Grace Alexander-Scott, and Dan Gingell, created by Hilton Productions Ltd, and released in three parts in 2013 via YouTube. This was later removed, with the whole film available to stream via Amazon Prime Video.

In 2013, Elemental appeared in the "Steampunx" episode of Phineas and Ferb, as well as the episode "The Bewildering Bout of the Astounding Automatons" of Penn Zero: Part-Time Hero.

Elemental collaborated with the steampunk rock group Steam Powered Giraffe on their song "Sky Sharks", from their 2015 album The Vice Quadrant: A Space Opera.

Elemental's 2015 album Apequest: The Search For Geoffrey inspired the Kickstarter-funded board game Apequest, which was expected to be released in May 2023.

== Personal life ==
Originally from Ipswich, Alborough currently lives in Brighton. Alborough has stated concern that by rapping about British culture his work could attract British nationalists with racial prejudice, saying in an interview he goes out of his way to alienate those people from his audience and that "the Professor is definitely a parody of the British class system."

== Discography ==
=== Albums ===
- Rebel Without Applause (2008)
- The Indifference Engine (2009)
- More Tea? (2010)
- Special School: The Album (2011)
- Father of Invention (2012)
- The Giddy Limit (2014)
- Apequest: The Search for Geoffrey (2015)
- Professor Elemental and his Amazing Friends (2016)
- School Of Whimsy (2018)
- Professor Elemental and his Amazing Friends 2 (2019)
- Let's Get Messy (2020)
- Good Dad Club (2021)
- Nemesis! (2021)
- Topsy Turvy (collaborative EP with Victor Ghastly) (2022)
- Professor Elemental and his Amazing Friends 3 (2023)
- ApeQuest 2 (2024)
- Unlikely Cyphers: Cereal Mascots (Feature) (2025)
- The Love Album (2025)
