= Krtin Nithiyanandam =

British student, scientist, and inventor (born 2000)

- Born: Krtin Kanna Nithiyanandam; 20 June 2000 (age 26); Chennai, India
- Education: Sutton Grammar School
- Scientific career
- Fields: Medical research, cancer research, Alzheimer's disease research, invention

Krtin Nithiyanandam is a British medical researcher. He was awarded the Scientific American Innovator Award at the 2015 Google Science Fair for his work on developing a novel diagnosis test for early-onset Alzheimer's disease. The award came with $25,000. In 2017, Krtin's research on identifying a mechanism to make triple-negative breast cancer more treatable won the Intermediate Science stream at the national Big Bang Fair. Recently, Nithiyanandam was the recipient of the U.K. Junior Water Prize for his project titled "A novel, photocatalytic, lead-sequestering bioplastic for sustainable water purification and environmental remediation". He represented the U.K. at the international Stockholm Junior Water Prize.

In 2017, Nithiyanandam was named as a Rising Star in Science by The Observer and as one of TIME's 30 Most Influential Teens of 2017.

== Biography ==
Krtin Nithiyanandam was born in Chennai, India and moved to Britain with his family. Nithiyanandam's interest in the medical sciences started after he suffered from hearing impairment as a child. He studied at Sutton Grammar School. Nithiyanandam has explained his research at TEDxLondon, TEDxGateway, WIRED: Next Generation, and the Royal Society of Medicine, and has advocated for increased student participation in scientific research. Krtin is a member of Stanford University's Class of 2022.

== Research ==
=== Alzheimer's research ===
Nithiyanandam's work focused on oligomeric amyloid beta as a biomarker for Alzheimer's disease instead of amyloid beta plaques. Nithiyanandam developed a bispecific antibody composed of two different Fab' fragments: one fragment from an anti-oligomeric amyloid beta IgG molecule and another fragment from an anti-transferrin receptor IgM molecule. Nithiyanandam's bispecific antibody is conjugated to a quantum dot with MRI and fNIR detection capabilities. Nithiyanandam's in vitro studies suggest that the bispecific antibody quantum dot conjugate has little cross-reactivity and could potentially cross the blood-brain barrier. He won the Scientific American Innovator Award at the Google Science Fair for this work.

=== Cancer research ===
Nithiyanandam's research sought to develop a novel siRNA mechanism to decrease ID4 expression in aggressive triple-negative breast cancers. Nithiyanandam found that a knockdown in ID4 expression resulted in aggressive triple-negative breast cancers developing primitive oestrogen receptors on their surface, consequently making the cancer susceptible to existing breast-cancer treatments. Moreover, Nithiyanandam found that increasing PTEN expression in several breast cancer cells lines, including MCF-7, resulted in increased chemosensitivity to cisplatin. However, increased PTEN expression in "healthy cell line" MCF10A resulted in decreased chemosensitivity to cisplatin. He was the winner of the Intermediate stream of the Big Bang Fair for his work.

=== Bioplastic research ===
Nithiyanandam developed a novel bioplastic capable of sequestering lead and purifying water through photocatalysis. CIWEM, the organisation that awards the U.K. Junior Water Prize, commented that Nithiyanandam's project focused "on meeting global wastewater management challenges, and exhibits wastewater as an opportunity rather than a waste product".
