= Billy "Uke" Scott =

- Born: William Scott; 12 March 1923
- Died: 23 November 2004 (aged 81)
- Occupations: Singer, songwriter, musician
- Instrument: Ukulele
- Years active: 1936–2002

Billy "Uke" Scott (12 March 1923 – 23 November 2004) was a British music hall star, who inspired three generations of ukulele players, composing, singing and writing a "teach-yourself" ukulele manual.

== Biography ==
William Scott was born in Sunderland. As a child, he took piano lessons and then became a singer with a jazz band. He made his variety debut aged 13 at the Empire Theatre, Newcastle.

During World War II, Scott worked for ENSA (Entertainments National Service Association) and established himself as a versatile artist. He appeared in the films Rainbow Round the Corner (1943) with the organist Robin Richmond and A Night of Magic (1944).

After the war, Scott was in demand with a busy schedule in variety and pantomime, especially on the Moss Empires touring circuit, and making his mark on the BBC radio programme Workers' Playtime. He supported Gracie Fields, Will Hay and Tommy Trinder and for a time he was Max Miller's pianist. Miller recorded Scott's song, "Down By the Old Turnstile".

Scott's signature tune was "He's Only Singing for One". He composed over 100 songs, 30 of which were published, included "I've Got a Girlfriend", "You Go On With Your Show" and "What Is the Good of a Good Girl?" He liked light-hearted songs about topical activities and subjects such as "A Nice Prefabricated Home" and "BINGO". In the 1950s, many variety theatres were being converted to Granada bingo halls, and Scott mourned their closure in "Pro's Lament", sung to the tune of "Granada".

His preferred instrument was the traditional wooden ukulele because of its sweet sound, rather than the more strident banjolele favoured by George Formby - though he played both. Scott used a special tuning when performing on live broadcasts and theatres. He tuned the third string an octave higher to make the ukulele stand out over the orchestra. He used a violin E string for this purpose. His instrument of choice was an Abbott Monarch ukulele when performing on stage.

== Radio ==
Scott was a popular radio performer; he was one of the biggest variety stars in Britain in the 1940s and 1950s. In a Goon Show script of 1954, Peter Sellers stated: "Thank you, thank you. Tonight I have included in my repertoire Schubert's violin sonata, guest soloist Billy 'Uke' Scott".

On the radio, Scott always finished his spot by picking up a Martin ukulele and say, "And now, just to prove that melody can be played on the ukulele..." He would launch into a stunning solo arrangement of "Lady of Spain", "Keep the Home Fires Burning", or similar, with full orchestral backing.

In the 1960s, with the death of variety, Scott became a theatrical agent and was astute at assessing budding talent in variety showcases. He discovered the schoolteacher Tom O'Connor, who became one of Britain's top comedians, and helped the early careers of Jimmy Tarbuck and Mike Yarwood. Scott was also one of the subjects of the TV programme The Impresarios, presented by Melvyn Bragg. However, the lure of performing proved too much, and in the early 1980s he discreetly put the wordout that he wanted to work on stage again. To his surprise, he was not forgotten. He played summer seasons, pantomimes, and one-night stands in vintage form.

Scott joined the Grand Order of Water Rats in 1952. He became the president of the Ukulele Society of Great Britain, and performed in old-time music halls until the mid-1990s.

He was a guest of the George Formby Society, which he was a longstanding member of, in November 1999 at the Winter Gardens, Blackpool, where he was made an honorary member. He spent an hour answering questions about his career, and closed by playing two numbers.

One of his final appearances was at the music hall at Ilkley in January 2002, in a charity variety show alongside Jimmy Cricket, the Bachelors, Dottie Wayne and Steve Galler.

Scott was married to Ann, and had one son and three daughters. His last years were spent in Southport, Lancashire, where he lived on a canal boat.
