= Andy Eastwood =

British musician (born 1979)

Andy Eastwood (born 20 May 1979 in Blackburn, Lancashire, England) is a vaudeville entertainer and ukulele player.

His interest in the ukulele and banjolele began when his grandfather gave him his first instrument as a child, and after reading music at the University of Oxford, where he also studied violin and piano, he graduated as the historic university's first musician ever to give a degree recital on the ukulele.

After cutting his teeth as a cabaret performer, Eastwood broke into theatre and developed a reputation as a multi-instrumental variety act, combining his instrumental and vocal prowess with comic delivery, notably reminiscent of British film comedian George Formby, to whom (amongst others) Eastwood pays tribute in his act. Recent years have seen him touring as an opening act and supporting act for Ken Dodd, Danny La Rue, Ronnie Ronalde and also starring in a wartime revue called We'll Meet Again.

Eastwood's first CD album in 1999, was Ukulele Serenade; it featured the comic songs of George Formby and various ukulele arrangements of well known standards, in keeping with his ambition to promote the ukulele to wider popularity than it had enjoyed in his youth. The album was championed by BBC Radio 2 presenter Desmond Carrington. Subsequent releases have included Ukulele Mania (2004), We'll Meet Again (2005), Bring Me Sunshine (2007), and Ukulele Mania Bonus Edition (2009). In addition to the ukulele and banjolele, he plays violin, guitar, banjo, piano, keyboards, drums, bass, washboard, and of course, vocals, on his recordings.

In 2008 Eastwood began presenting a music programme called Andy's Attic on the internet radio station Retro Jukebox, and in 2010 he released his first DVD, We'll Meet Again.

Eastwood's TV appearances include Barrymore, Blue Peter, GMTV, Today with Des and Mel, and he also taught comedian Frank Skinner to play the ukulele for the 2006 BBC One show Play It Again. Skinner became so interested in the instrument that as a result he went on to make a George Formby documentary for BBC Four, in which Eastwood also appeared. A further Skinner documentary What A Performance in 2015 also featured Eastwood discussing George Formby and playing one of Formby's original instruments, which he now owns.

Eastwood continued his quest to demonstrate the ukulele's worth as a 'serious' instrument in 2015 with the release of Three Classics for Ukulele, a suite of classical pieces arranged as challenging instrumental solos.

In 2016 he was voted into the showbusiness charity organisation The Grand Order of Water Rats.

== Discography ==
- Ukulele Serenade (1999) Label: ACE Music Catalogue No: ACE 991
- Running Wild with the band 'Red Hot & Blonde' (2002) Label: ACE Music Catalogue No: ACE 021
- Ukulele Mania (2004) Label: ACE Music Catalogue No: ACE 031
- We'll Meet Again (2005) Label: ACE Music Catalogue No: ACE 051
- Bring Me Sunshine (2007) Label: ACE Music Catalogue No: ACE 061
- Ukulele Mania Bonus Edition (2009) Label: ACE Music Catalogue No: ACE 081
- We'll Meet Again (DVD) (2010) Label: ACE Music Catalogue No: ACE 101
- Spirit Of The Blitz with singer Lucia Matisse (2011) Label: ACE Music Catalogue No: ACE 111
- We'll Meet Again Bonus Edition (2015) Label: ACE Music Catalogue No: ACE 151
- The Andy Eastwood Collection (2015) Label: ACE Music Catalogue No: ACE 152
- Three Classics For Ukulele (EP) (2015) Label: ACE Music Catalogue No: ACE 153
