= John Grey & Sons =

British musical instrument manufacturer

John Grey & Sons (London) Limited, a subsidiary company of Barnett, Samuel & Sons, was established in Westminster in 1832. The company became well known for the manufacture of fine banjos, guitars and drums. The company was founded in 1832 and originally manufactured watches and steel pens and only distributed musical instruments wholesale. In 1928, the company was bought by Rose, Morris & Co.

"There was, at the turn of the century, a well established musical instrument house called Barnett, Samuel & Sons, and from this root had sprung the Decca Gramophone Company, amongst others. An offshoot of this organisation was the company of John Grey & Sons (London) Limited, established in Westminster in 1832, renowned for its fine banjos and by 1932 trading in the full range of musical merchandise in Worship Street, not far from the premises of Rose, Morris & Co. Ltd. After delicate negotiation, the John Grey stock and business were acquired by R.M."
