= Manufacturing Technologies Association =

- Abbreviation: MTA
- Formation: 1919; 107 years ago
- Type: Trade association
- Legal status: Non-profit company
- Purpose: Engineering based manufacturing in the UK
- Location: London, United Kingdom
- Region served: UK
- Members: British manufacturing companies
- Chief Executive Officer: James Selka
- Main organ: MTA Board (President - Stewart Lane)
- Affiliations: Engineering and Machinery Alliance, Comité Europeén de Coopération des Industries de la Machine-Outil (CECIMO), CELIMO
- Website: www.mta.org.uk

The Manufacturing Technologies Association (MTA) is a British trade association based in London representing the manufacturing technologies industry. The MTA sits at the core of the engineering based manufacturing sector and as an association works to support its member companies.

The association's key activities include, representing engineering based manufacturing and supporting the advanced engineering sector through lobbying, media contact and networking. Providing relevant and specific industry intelligence. Encouraging talent through funding and support for workplace training and education initiatives in schools, colleges and universities. Delivering the UK's major exhibition focused on manufacturing technologies – MACH (owned and organised by the MTA) biennially.

Membership of the MTA is open to companies involved with the manufacturing technologies sector and end users of such technology.

== History ==
The original Machine Tools Trades Association (MTTA) was formed in 1919, becoming the Machine Tools Technologies Association. Since its formation the association has evolved into a trade body with a global support network, promoting internationally competitive trade in manufacturing technologies.

== Function ==
The MTA represents UK companies, their associates and affiliates who drive UK manufacturing technology, innovation and quality.

The website contains a member & product directory by geographic position. It also provides information and statistics on the economic health of the British manufacturing markets.

MTA is the owner and organiser of the UK's premier manufacturing event - the MACH exhibition, a week-long event held biennially in April at the NEC.

The types of manufacturing technologies covered by the organisation, and the exhibition, include:

- Metalcutting
- Metalforming
- Automation and robotics
- CAD/CAM
- Engineering lasers
- Measurement and inspection
- Tooling and workholding
- Welding and metal fabrication
- Rapid manufacturing and rapid prototyping

== Structure ==
The MTA is based in London, with close contact with the British Government through the Department for Business, Energy and Industrial Strategy, CBI and UK Trade & Investment.

The association's offices are located on Bayswater Road (A402) next to Lancaster Gate tube station.

The association also provides a secretariat service to Engineering Supply Chain UK (ESCUK), and ‘Additive Manufacturing UK’ (AMUK).

== See also ==
- Manufacturing in the United Kingdom
- EMO (trade show)
