= Chap hop =

Music genre

- Stylistic origins: British hip hop; music hall; comedy hip hop; cabaret; steampunk; British comedy
- Cultural origins: Mid- to late 2000s, United Kingdom
- Typical instruments: Sampler; turntables; sequencer; banjo; ukulele; vocals; piano

Other topics
- The Chap; young fogeys

Chap hop is a fusion genre of music originating from England that mixes the hip-hop genre with elements from the Chappist or steampunk subcultures and stereotypical English obsessions such as cricket, tea, and the weather.

== History ==
Two leading exponents of the genre are Professor Elemental and Mr.B The Gentleman Rhymer, who belong to the steampunk and Chappist factions of chap hop respectively. Other notable artists are Poplock Holmes & DJ WattsOn, and Sir Reginald Pikedevant, Esquire.

In March 2013, UK Education Secretary Michael Gove said he was a fan of the genre. Mr. B noted the irony of this, since his music often pokes at members of the establishment, commenting: "As a non-Etonian and thus an outcast within the cabinet, this is perhaps a little snook cocked at his colleagues."

== See also ==
- British hip hop
