= Mr.B The Gentleman Rhymer =

Rap artist persona created by Jim Burke

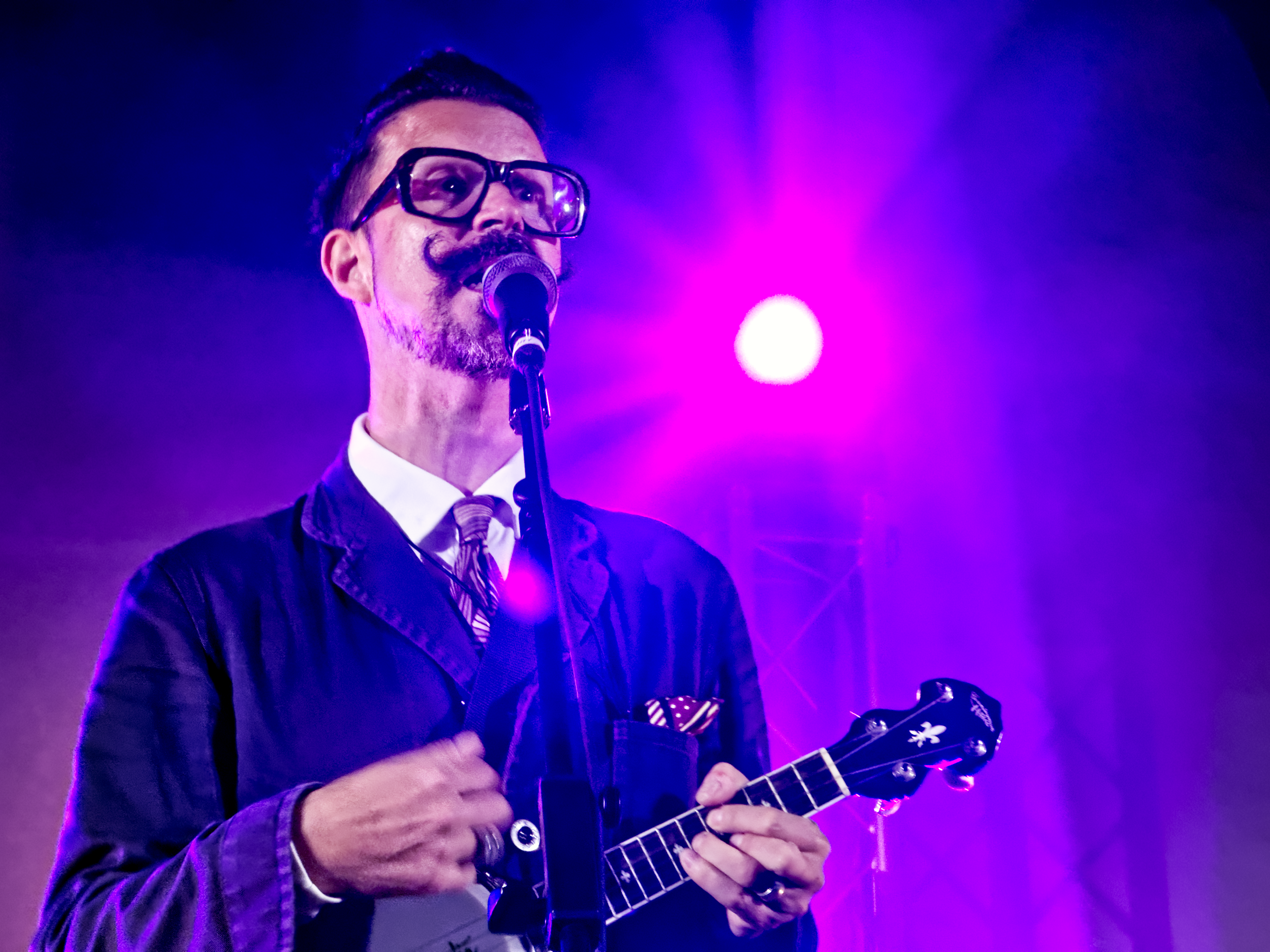
- Mr B. Performing in Ipswich, 2023

Background information
- Birth name: Jim Burke
- Origin: United Kingdom
- Genres: Chap hop
- Occupation(s): Singer, songwriter
- Website: www.gentlemanrhymer.com

Jim Burke, known professionally as Mr.B The Gentleman Rhymer, is a British parodist who performs "chap hop" – hip hop delivered in a Received Pronunciation accent. Mr.B raps, or "rhymes", about good manners, dressing with style and dignity, sophisticated society, pipe smoking and cricket while playing the banjolele. The character is described as having grown up in Cheam and attending Sutton Grammar School.

== Background ==
Mr.B The Gentleman Rhymer is an alter ego of Jim Burke, a rapper with the Britpop group Collapsed Lung whose most famous song was 'Eat My Goal'. Burke started performing as Mr.B in late 2007, playing at cabaret clubs, and venues across the UK including the Glastonbury Festival and club NME in Paris, and performed as part of the 2010 Edinburgh Fringe Festival. He has performed on radio including the Steve Lamacq show and "Introducing with Tom Robinson" for the BBC. He has also been named as a 'Band of the Month' on the Kooba Radio podcast.

His debut album "Flattery Not Included" was released in 2008 for the Grot Music label, which includes the track "Chap-Hop History" which is a Received Pronunciation reworking of some well-known hip hop classics. Its accompanying video has received over 1.5 million views on YouTube. Another track from the album, "Timothy", is about the unique vocal style of BBC Radio's Tim Westwood. Perhaps his best-known track, "Straight Out of Surrey", is a parody of N.W.A's "Straight Outta Compton" and purports to show "the extent of [his] cricket knowledge."

Mr.B has appeared as a guest on the Zero Day album by MC Frontalot, playing the banjolele and providing additional vocals on the track "Better at Rapping".

He and fellow "chap-hop" artist Professor Elemental were jokingly engaged in a feud for some time. However, Professor Elemental had a short appearance in Mr.B's music video for the song "Just Like a Chap", of which Professor Elemental said "Much as I hate to admit it, I bloody love that video and am jolly glad [Mr. B] let me gate crash." The "feud" was settled on Professor Elemental's 2012 album Father Of Invention on the track "The Duel," on which Mr. B appeared, and they have made occasional appearances together since.

As well as his work as The Gentleman Rhymer, Burke has also released works of "chapstep" under the name Mr.B The Gentleman Selector, and self-described "terribly English electronica" as The Major.

After opening for Sparks on their 2023 tour, Mr.B released an EP titled Larks & Sparks featuring the Sparks covers he performed during his opening sets.

== Discography ==
=== Studio albums ===
- Flattery Not Included (2008)
- I Say! (2010)
- The Tweed Album (2012)
- Can't Stop, Shan't Stop (2013)
- Mr.B's Christmas Album (2015)
- There's a Rumpus Going On (2016)
- Dandinista (2019)
- A Thoroughly Modern Existential Crisis (2020)
- Chop Happy: Mashups And Bootlegs Volume One (2021)
- Quid Pro Flow (2023)
- National Treasure (2023)
- B-CURIOUS (2025)

=== Compilations ===
- O.G. Original Gentleman (2011) (Digital release / Released on CD in 2013)
- Acid Ragtime: Chapstep Volume One (2014)
- Chapstep, Vol. 2: Olde Jack Swing (2017)

=== Singles and EPs ===
- Oh, Santa! (2012)
- The Chap Trilogy (EP) (2016)
- Paper Plates (EP) (2018)
- I'm Getting The Blame For Christmas (EP) (2020)
- Larks & Sparks (EP) (2023)
